= Porfírio Pardal Monteiro =

Portuguese architect (1897–1957)

- Born: 16 February 1897; Sintra, Portugal
- Died: 16 December 1957 (aged 60); Lisbon
- Cause of death: Suicide
- Resting place: Alto de São João Cemetery
- Education: Lisbon School of Fine Arts
- Occupation: Architect
- Years active: 1919–1956
- Spouse: Maria Luísa Vasques Kopke Correia Pinto
- Children: 4
- Awards: Valmor Prize: 1923/28/29/38/40; Commander of the Military Order of Saint James of the Sword, 1962 (posthumous)
- Practice: Pardal Monteiro Arquitetos
- Buildings: Caixa Geral de Depósitos, Porto; Cais do Sodré railway station, Lisbon; Instituto Superior Técnico, Lisbon; Hotel Ritz, Lisbon

Porfírio Pardal Monteiro (1897–1957) was a Portuguese architect and university professor, considered one of the most important architects of the first half of the 20th century in Portugal. Along with other architects, who included Cottinelli Telmo, Carlos Ramos, Luís Cristino da Silva, Cassiano Branco, and Jorge Segurado, he led the development of modernist architecture in Portugal. He left his mark on Portugal's capital, Lisbon, having been responsible for many of its most important architectural achievements between the 1920s and 1950s.

== Early life ==
Monteiro was born on 16 February 1897 in the parish of Pero Pinheiro in the municipality of Sintra. He was the son of Pedro Manuel Monteiro who came from a family of builders who worked in the marble and stonework industry. His mother was Mariana Gertrudes Monteiro, a domestic worker. He was the sixth child from his father's first marriage and had another brother from his father’s second marriage. Together with a brother he moved to Lisbon in 1904 to complete his primary education.

From the age of 13, Monteiro studied at the Lisbon School of Fine Arts, initially following general studies before devoting himself to architecture, where he was a student of José Luís Monteiro, who also came from a family of stonemasons. While still attending the school, he worked in the studio of Miguel Ventura Terra, a friend of his father and one of the most prominent architects of the early 20th century in Portugal, who not only influenced his views on architecture but also influenced his Republican convictions. These led him to enlist as a volunteer in the Lisbon Academic battalion in 1919, which was formed to fight rebels who wished to reinstate the monarchy and had captured the Fort of Monsanto near Lisbon.

== Career ==
In 1919, after completing an architecture degree, Monteiro was employed by the School Construction Division of the Ministry of Education. In the same year, he married Maria Luísa Vasques Kopke Correia Pinto. They would have four children. Also in 1919 he designed his first building, a mansion in the traditional Portuguese style. In 1920, he joined the architecture department of the Caixa Geral de Depósitos (CGD), where he would stay until 1929. He developed the CGD branches in Alcântara Setúbal, and Porto. With a substantial budget for the Porto branch, he integrated Art Deco features into a neoclassical building, reflecting his experience during a 1925 trip to Paris, where he visited the International Exhibition of Modern Decorative and Industrial Arts.

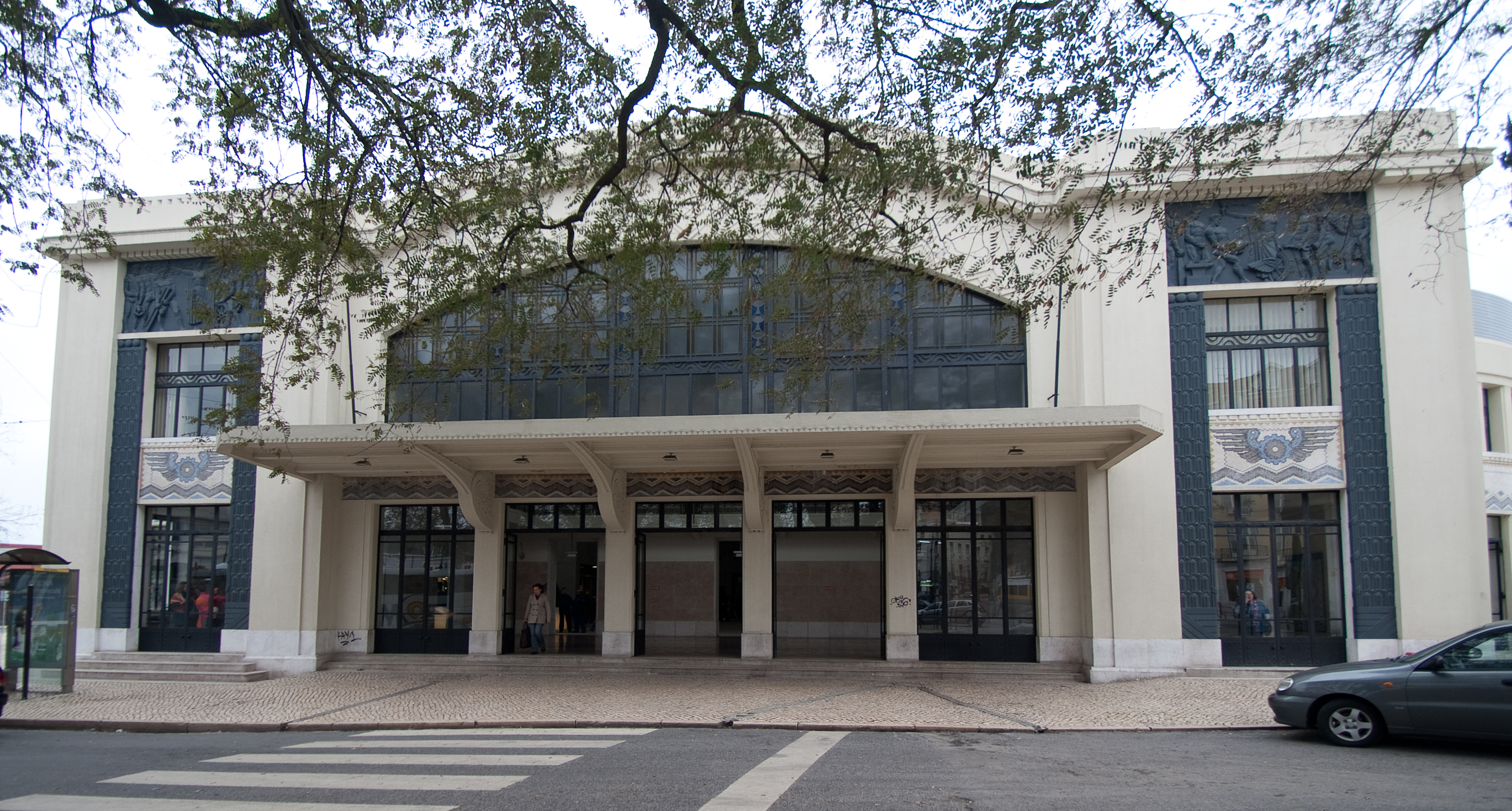
Cais do Sodré railway station

At the same time as working for CGD, he became first assistant in the newly created chair of architecture in the civil engineering programme at the Instituto Superior Técnico (IST) in Lisbon. Between 1925 and 1928 he worked on the Art Deco Cais do Sodré railway station, the Lisbon terminus for the line from Cascais. In 1927, he began designing new facilities for the IST, adopting, as at Cais do Sodré, the reinforced concrete construction system, but this time on a much larger scale. This project would become a major opportunity to promote modern architecture in Portugal. It also marked the first collaboration between Monteiro and Duarte Pacheco, then director of IST, who would go on to become the Minister of Public Works and the Mayor of Lisbon.

Projects for the National Institute of Statistics and other important buildings in the 1930s followed. In 1930, he became a correspondent for the newly created L'Architecture d'Aujourd'hui magazine, which gave his work international visibility between 1934 and 1938 (during World War II, the magazine was secretly based in his studio). In 1932, he became a founding member of the RIA (Réunion International des Architectes) group, which became the predecessor of the International Union of Architects (UIA). In that same year, he undertook a study trip to the Soviet Union as part of a group of European architects.

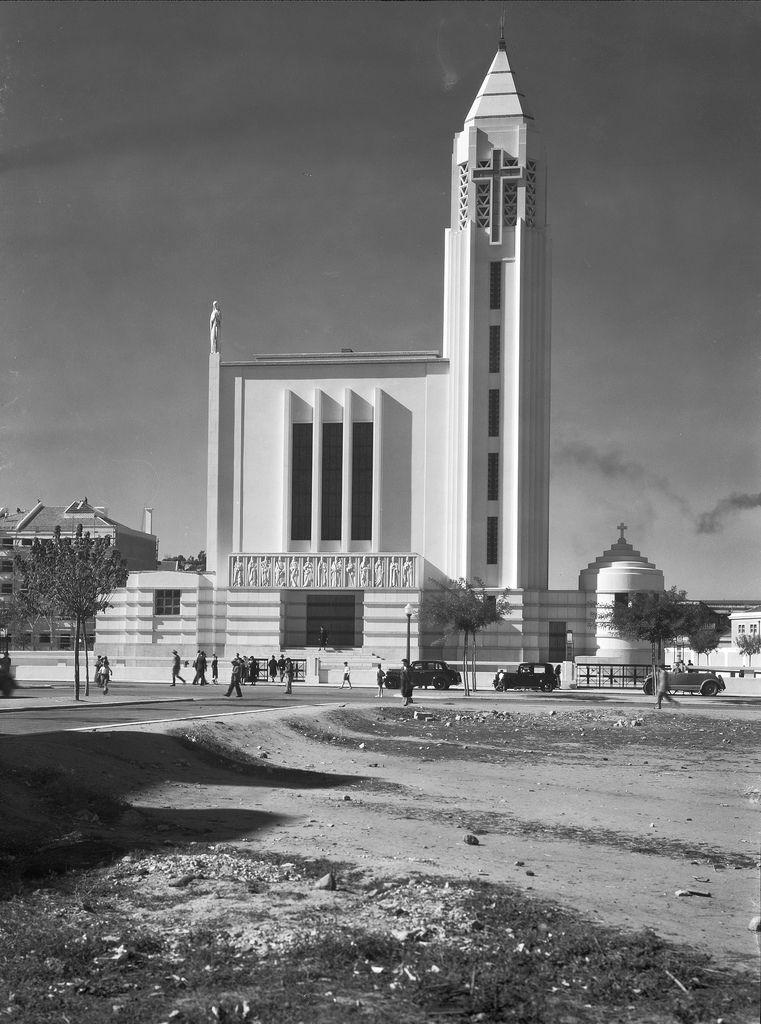
Church of Our Lady of Fátima

In 1933, he designed the Church of Our Lady of the Rosary of Fátima in Lisbon, for which he received the 1938 Valmor Prize. Despite the Catholic Church's support, the building's modernity would be challenged by the more conservative sectors of Portuguese society. For this project, he enlisted the collaboration of a group of nine artists, including Francisco Franco, Almada Negreiros, and Lino António. In 1934, he began projects for the Alcântara Maritime Terminal and the Rocha do Conde de Óbidos Terminal, completed in 1943 and 1948, where he again collaborated with Negreiros. In 1936 he participated in the 13th International Congress of Architects in Rome, where he sought out ideas from similar ocean liner terminals in other countries, including those at Cherbourg and Le Havre in France, Genoa and Trieste in Italy, and some in the United States, including Los Angeles. In 1936, he took office as president of the National Union of Architects (until 1944); and in 1937, he travelled to Algeria and Italy with Pacheco and then to Paris, where he attended the Exposition Internationale des Arts et Techniques dans la Vie Moderne.

From 1938 onward, Portuguese public commissions began to be influenced by a wave of nationalist revivalism; this change culminating in the Portuguese World Exhibition of 1940. Unlike many of his generation, Monteiro resisted the stylistic shift to buildings with more of a monumental dignity, staying faithful to his "utilitarian rationalist convictions". He continued to work with Pacheco until, in the late 1930s, a rift occurred, leading to his prolonged absence from all public commissions, which in turn led him to accept projects for several luxury buildings in Lisbon. According to João Vieira Caldas, architect and author of a biography on Monteiro, Pacheco liked to "comment on the drawings presented to him by crossing them out with a pencil, a habit that deeply irritated Pardal Monteiro". Therefore, when he showed him new drawings Monteiro decided to present them covered by glass. Pacheco said nothing at the time but his relationship with Monteiro cooled completely. Ana Tostões, professor of history of architecture at the IST and also author of a biography of Monteiro, suggests that the rift between the two may also have been related to the substantial changes in the design of the two maritime terminals for the Port of Lisbon, because of budgetary constraints.

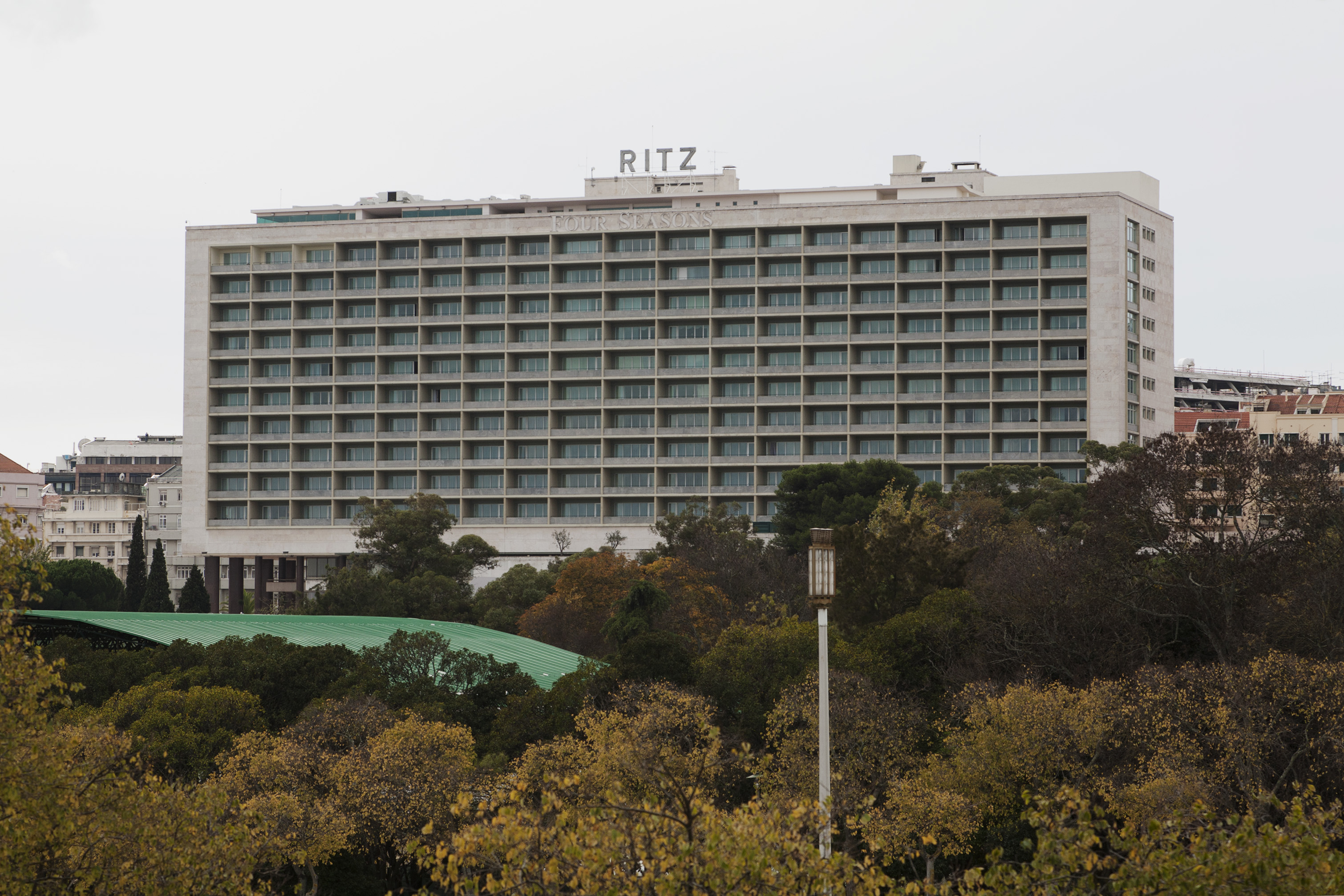
Hotel Ritz in Lisbon

In 1942, Monteiro was appointed full professor of architecture at the IST. In 1944, he was elected president of the General Assembly of the National Union of Architects (re-elected in 1948 and 1951). In 1946, he participated in the founding of the UIA at the Royal Institute of British Architects in London. Two years later, he participated in the first UIA congress in Lausanne, and in 1953, he coordinated the third, in Portugal. He played an active role in organizing the First National Congress of Architecture in 1948, a historic event that marked the consolidation of the professional class and the emergence of a new generation that would challenge the role of his generation's leadership of architecture in Portugal.

From the late 1940s onwards, Pardal Monteiro received new major public and private commissions, designing the National Civil Engineering Laboratory and the Mundial, Tivoli. In the early 1950s the leader of the Portuguese Estado Novo dictatorship, António de Oliveira Salazar, who considered that the capital had no hotel of sufficient quality for important foreign visitors, set in motion the development of what would eventually become the Hotel Ritz (now the Four Seasons). Monteiro worked with Jorge Ferreira Chaves and other architects to design the hotel, but was never to see the finished product. In addition to its bedrooms with balconies overlooking the Edward VII Park and providing other views of Lisbon, the hotel became notable for its interior artwork including by Almada Negreiros, his wife Sarah Affonso, and Lino António, who had all previously worked with Negreiros, as well as Carlos Botelho, Sá Nogueira, and Bartolomeu Cid dos Santos.

== Illness and death ==
In 1956, Monteiro suffered the first of at least two strokes. Unable to work and plunged into depression, he committed suicide on 16 December 1957, with barbiturates, at his home in Lisbon. He was buried in the Alto de São João Cemetery.

On 5 January 1962, he was posthumously made a Commander of the Military Order of Saint James of the Sword. His nephew, António Pardal Monteiro, continued some of his work in collaboration with Anselmo Fernandez (1918–2000), who had collaborated with Monteiro from the 1940s. Later, in 1986, the firm Pardal Monteiro Arquitetos was founded by António Pardal Monteiro and three of his architect sons.

In his honour there is a street named Rua Pardal Monteiro, in the Loios neighborhood of Marvila.

== Major works and awards ==
Monteiro's works include:

- 1920 – Building at 49 Av. da República; Valmor Prize 1923.
- 1923 – Temple of the Lisbon Adventist Church – Caixa Geral de Depósitos Building, Avenida dos Aliados, Porto
- 1925 – House on Calçada de Santo Amaro, Lisbon; Valmor Prize 1928.
- 1926 – Cais do Sodré railway station, Lisbon – House on Avenida 5 de Outubro, 207–215, Lisbon; Valmor Prize 1929.
- 1927 – University campus and buildings of the Instituto Superior Técnico, Lisbon.
- 1930 – Ford Lusitana Building, Rua Castilho, Lisbon (demolished)
- 1931 – National Institute of Statistics, Lisbon.
- 1938 – Church of Our Lady of the Rosary of Fátima, Valmor Prize 1938 – Monument to António José de Almeida, Lisbon (with Leopoldo de Almeida).
- 1936 – Diário de Notícias Building, Lisbon – Valmor Prize 1940.
- 1940 – Pavilion and Sphere of Knowledge, Portuguese World Exhibition, Lisbon.
- 1942–1947 – Various residential buildings in Lisbon; Municipal Architecture Prize 1947 (residential building, Avenida Sidónio Pais, No. 16, Lisbon).
- 1943 – Alcântara Maritime Terminal, Lisbon 1949 – National Laboratory of Civil Engineering, Lisbon.
- 1948 – Rocha do Conde de Óbidos Maritime Terminal, Lisbon.
- 1952 – Tivoli Hotel, Avenida da Liberdade, Lisbon – Mundial Building (Hotel Mundial), Lisbon – Beginning of projects for the University City, Lisbon (Faculty of Law, Faculty of Arts, Rectorate).
- 1954 – Beginning of the project for the National Library of Portugal, Lisbon.
- 1959 – Ritz Hotel (currently the Four Seasons), Lisbon
