= Hotel Ritz (Lisbon) =

Luxury hotel in Lisbon, Portugal

Four Seasons Hotel Ritz Lisbon

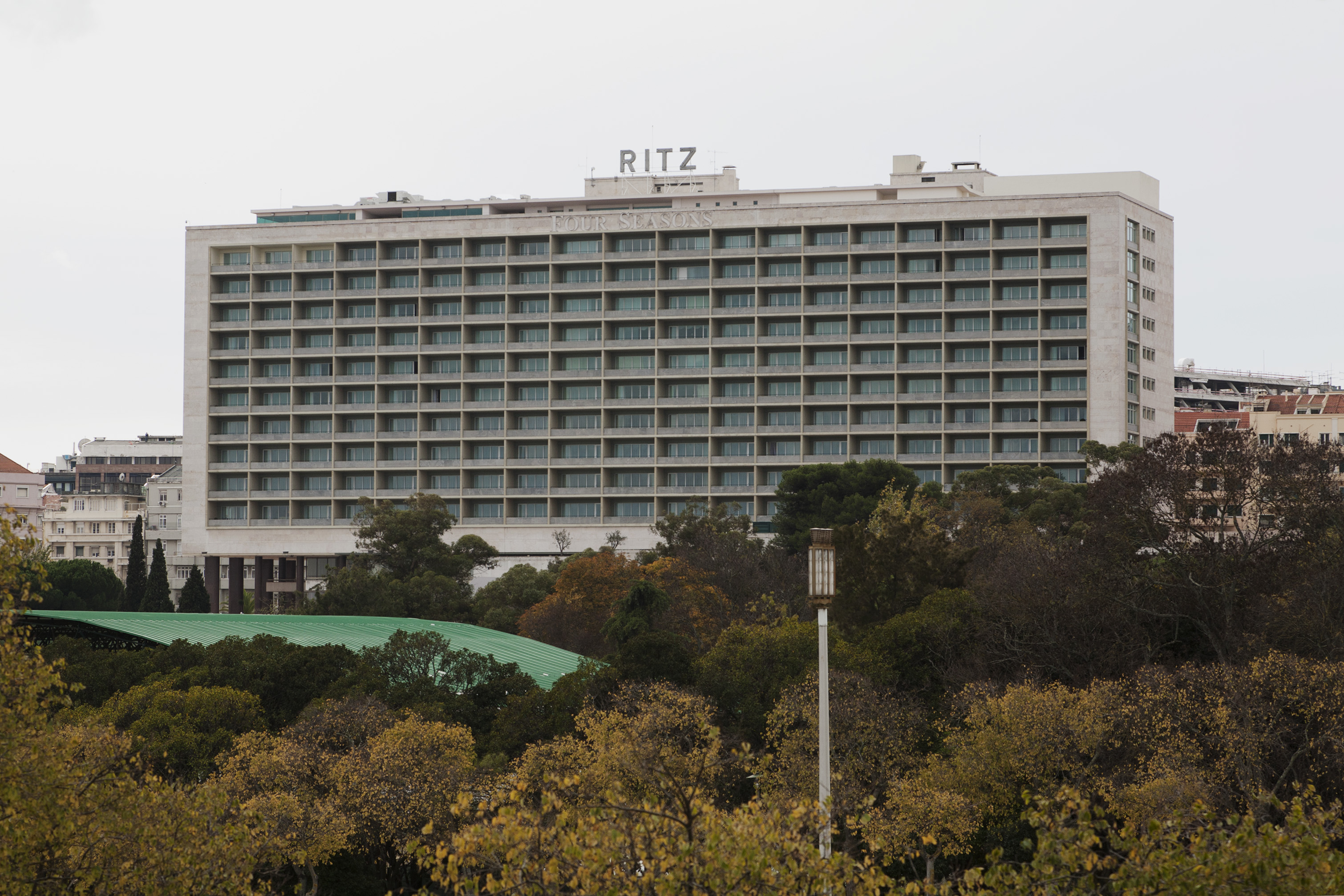
- Interactive map of the Four Seasons Hotel Ritz Lisbon area

General information
- Location: Rua Rodrigo da Fonseca 88, 1099-039, Lisbon, Portugal
- Coordinates: 38°43′32″N 09°09′19″W
- Opening: 1959
- Management: Four Seasons Hotels and Resorts

Technical details
- Floor count: 15

Design and construction
- Architect: Porfírio Pardal Monteiro
- Developer: SODIM (Sociedade de Investimentos Imobiliários)

Other information
- Number of rooms: 290
- Number of suites: 20

Website
- www.ritzlisbon.com

The Four Seasons Hotel Ritz Lisbon is a luxury hotel located in the Portuguese capital of Lisbon. It was built in the 1950s on the wishes of the leader of the Portuguese Estado Novo dictatorship, António de Oliveira Salazar, who considered that the capital had no hotel of sufficient quality for important foreign visitors.

== Historical Context ==
Since 1912, there had been the idea in Lisbon that the construction of a large luxury hotel was a pressing need. In the 1930s, a leading hotelier did purchase land for this purpose but eventually ended up selling it. The idea resurfaced when planning was underway for the Portuguese World Exhibition (Portuguese: Exposição do Mundo Português), which was held in Lisbon in 1940 to mark 800 years since the foundation of the country and 300 years since the restoration of independence from Spain. It was considered that there would be many important visitors without anywhere suitable for them to stay. The plan was to call the new hotel A Casa do Império (The House of the Empire). However, although several hotel projects were considered all were abandoned.

== Design ==
In 1950, Salazar returned to the idea of building "a great first-class hotel in Lisbon" and took personal responsibility to supervise the project. A financing company, SODIM (Sociedade de Investimentos Imobiliários), was created especially for this purpose, with 11 partners including the businessman, Manuel Queiroz Pereira, and the banker Ricardo Espírito Santo, who was very close to Salazar and was his initial contact to develop the idea. In 1952, the architect, Porfírio Pardal Monteiro, a renowned Portuguese modernist architect, was contacted by Pereira to help select the location for the future hotel. In 1952, even before the acquisition of the land, Monteiro had started to make a preliminary sketch. A second study carried out in the same year produced a design without the rooms having balconies and was said to have displayed the influence of the work of Le Corbusier. A third version, completed in 1954, was sent to the Ritz hotel chain in Paris, whose architect considered it insufficiently modern. By the beginning of 1955 a new design had been completed by Monteiro in partnership with Jorge Ferreira Chaves and several young architects including Monteiro's son, António. Unlike earlier designs, which had employed two perpendicular blocks, this consisted of just one block. This early 1955 design was very similar to the final one, with all rooms having balconies, as the views of Lisbon's Edward VII Park and the rest of the city were considered to be one of the selling points of the new hotel.

== Internal features ==
Monteiro was particularly keen to control the internal as well as external design of the hotel. Numerous artists contributed to the interior design. The tiles were designed by Jorge Barradas, the drawings for tapestries were by José de Almada Negreiros, Sarah Affonso, Lino António, and others, while other artists to be represented included Carlos Botelho, Sá Nogueira, and Bartolomeu Cid dos Santos. Some of the furniture was supplied by the Ricardo Espírito Santo Foundation, the banker having died in 1955. The large number of works of art contained in the hotel mean that it is often referred to as a “living museum”.

== Management of the hotel ==
The hotel has 290 rooms (including 20 suites). This was Monteiro's last project as he died in 1957. Chaves saw the project through to the hotel's inauguration in 1959, together with Leonardo Rey Colaço de Castro Freire of the Estado Novo's National Information Secretariat (Secretariado Nacional de Informação). SODIM received considerable subsidies from the Government: for twenty years no taxes were paid on the land, and the builders were also exempt from customs duties on items such as marble, pianos, and furniture. The name "Ritz" was negotiated with the Charles Ritz chain in 1958, and the Sociedade Hoteis Ritz (Ritz Hotels Company) was created. Management was given to Les Grands Hôtels Européens. The official opening of the Ritz was attended by 2000 guests, including 100 from overseas. In 1979 management returned to SODIM. Some renovation and modernization was carried out and management was taken over by the Intercontinental Hotels Group, which would run the hotel until 1995. The Four Seasons chain took over in 1997.
