= Alcântara Maritime Terminal =

Ocean liner terminal in Portugal

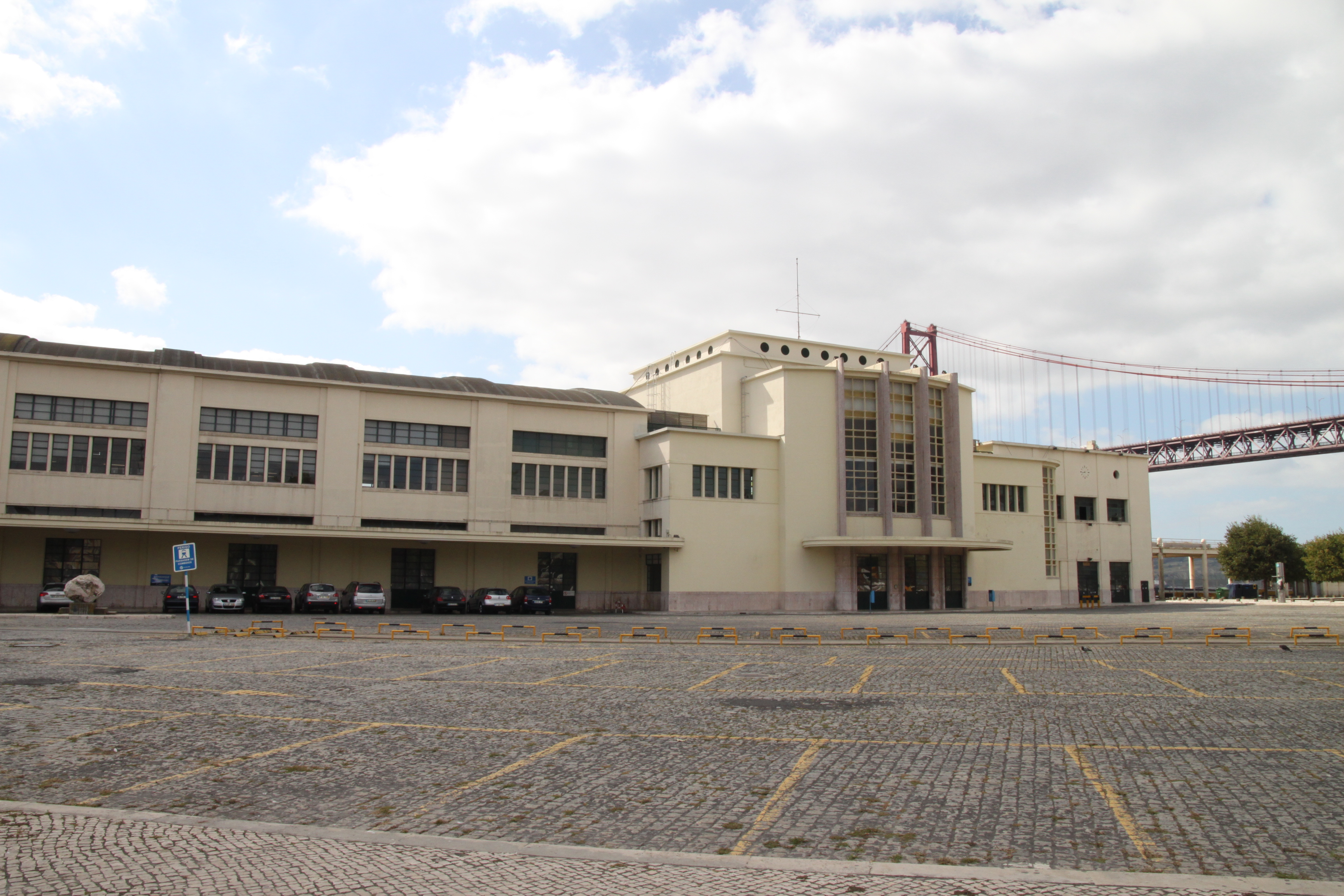
- Front view of the terminal
- Established: 1943; 83 years ago
- Location: Doca Alcântara, 1350 Lisbon, Portugal
- Coordinates: 38.699361°N 9.174472°W
- Website: https://www.portodelisboa.pt/visita-virtual-gares

The Alcântara Maritime Terminal (Portuguese: Gare Marítima de Alcântara), located in Alcântara in the Portuguese capital of Lisbon, is a former ocean liner terminal building near the mouth of the Tagus River. Together with the Rocha Conde de Óbidos Maritime Terminal, about 800 metres (870 yd) to the east, it was designed by architect Porfírio Pardal Monteiro and built in the 1940s as part of the modernization of the ports serving Lisbon. Both terminals feature large murals by Almada Negreiros. No longer used for passengers, the Alcântara terminal now contains an interpretation centre that describes the history of the terminals and the development of the murals by Negreiros.

== History ==
In 1932 the authoritarian Estado Novo government of Portugal established the Ministry of Works and Communications as a response to the Great Depression. Under the young minister, Duarte Pacheco, a centralised public works policy was set up and the regime began to make significant investments in infrastructure, creating, in the process, considerable employment opportunities for architects and for visual artists to contribute to the interiors of the buildings.

The original plan, in 1933, was to build a large terminal close to the railway station and ferry terminal at Cais do Sodré, in the centre of Lisbon. However, this would have taken some time as it was dependent on the construction of a pier. In January 1934 an agreement was reached with Monteiro to design a smaller project in Alcântara. As the first project of its kind in Portugal, those responsible devoted considerable attention to ensuring that the project met the architectural requirements required of a gateway to Portugal. To develop the design, the port administration provided a detailed list of the essential services to be installed. A study was conducted of several terminals in other countries, both completed and in the process of completion; Monteiro having gathered information when he attended the 13th International Congress of Architects in Rome. These included those at Cherbourg and Le Havre in France, Genoa and Trieste in Italy, and some in the United States, including Los Angeles.

Monteiro presented a preliminary design in June 1934, which was approved. The design was finalised in October 1936, and included a second terminal, to be called the Rocha do Conde de Óbidos terminal. However, the Higher Council of Public Works, an arm of the ministry, rejected the designs because of the cost. This made it impossible to meet a 1940 deadline, it having been originally planned that the Alcântara terminal would be completed in time for the Portuguese World Exhibition in that year. Revised designs were approved in 1938 and preparatory work began in 1940, with construction for the Alcântara terminal being undertaken in 1942/43. Monteiro's design followed modernist architectural principles. The concept applied to the terminal was that it should be a place where visitors could obtain a positive impression about the country when disembarking, as a result of the comfort, convenience, and grandeur the terminal presented. The structure was made of reinforced concrete with a ground floor and an upper floor. On the upper floor, on the river side, there is a sidewalk or terrace supported by columns. The upper floor was largely used by departing passengers, with first and second-class departure lounges, currency exchange, a post office, souvenir shops and other services, while the ground floor was mainly for customs and baggage reclaim. The Negreiros murals were on the upper floors.

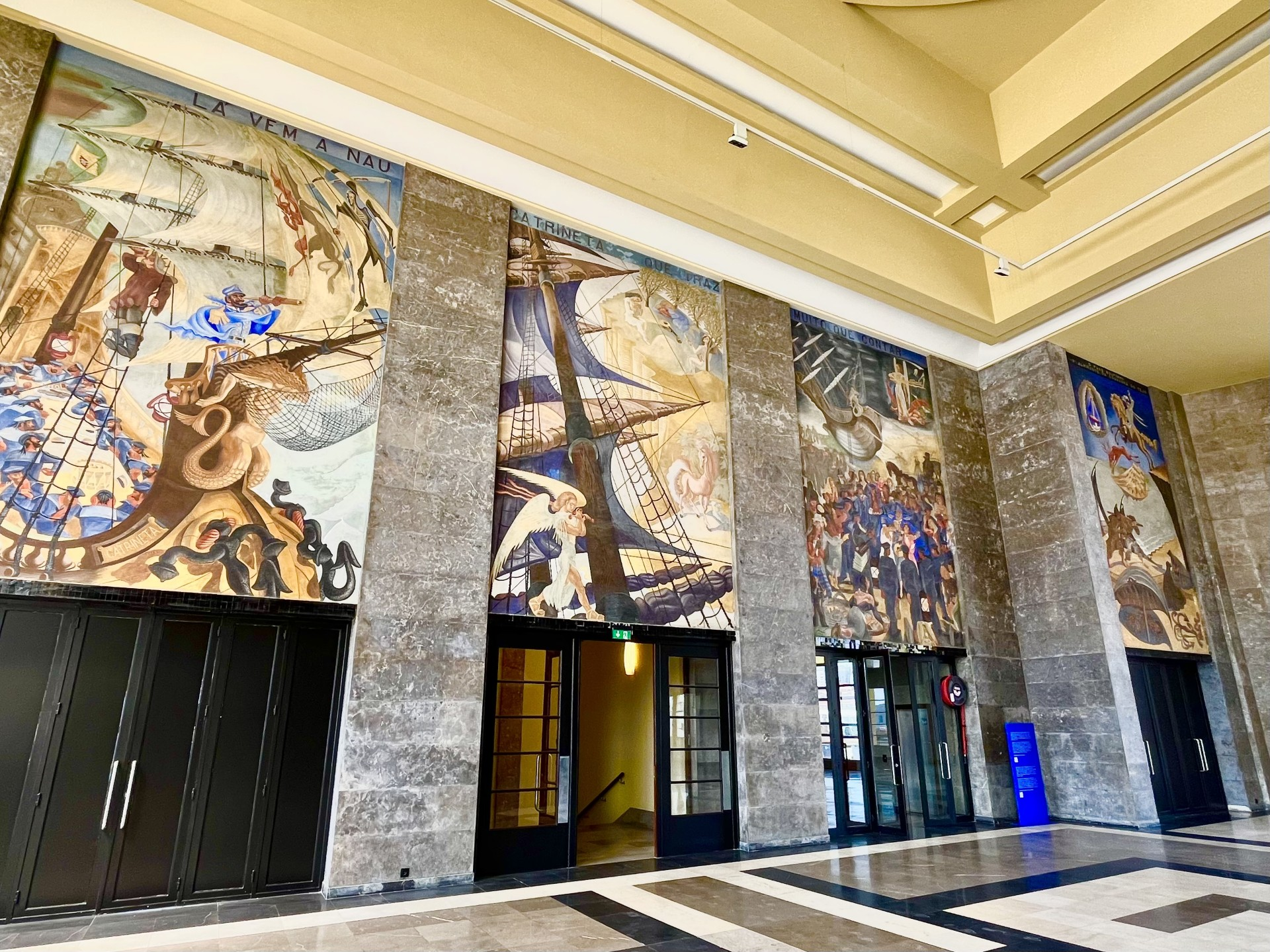
The upper floor of the Alcântara terminal with murals by Negreiros

The terminal was inaugurated on 17 July 1943, with a simple ceremony to welcome the steamship Serpa Pinto from Philadelphia. Although the station had not been fully finished, it offered better boarding and disembarking conditions than those available in Lisbon at the time. From the early days of World War II until 1942 there had been considerable passenger liner traffic across the Atlantic, both to Brazil and the US, carrying Jewish refugees, in particular. However, after 1942 this diminished and usage of the terminal remained limited until the war ended. In 1946 refugees started to return to Europe and some limited tourism began to develop. The Rocha do Conde de Óbidos terminal was completed in 1949, also being opened before completion. The terminals had their peak usage in the 1950s and 1960s, after which air travel became the preferred mode of travel. Following the April 1974 Carnation Revolution, which overthrew the Estado Novo, Portugal's colonies became independent states. Portuguese military, as well as over half a million of the Portuguese people who lived in those countries, then returned to their home country, by ship and by plane, giving the maritime terminals a brief new lease of life. Modern-day cruise ships do not use the terminals but dock further to the east, in the Alfama area of Lisbon.

== The murals ==
Almada Negreiros had already worked with Monteiro on two previous occasions; with the Church of Our Lady of the Rosary of Fátima, the first modernist church built in Portugal, and the Diário de Notícias building, both in Lisbon. Although he was commissioned by Duarte Pacheco to carry out the work, it is likely that Monteiro recommended him to Pacheco. In the two terminals, Negreiros had an unusually large area for mural painting, and the goal was for his murals to be seamlessly integrated with Monteiro's modernist architecture.

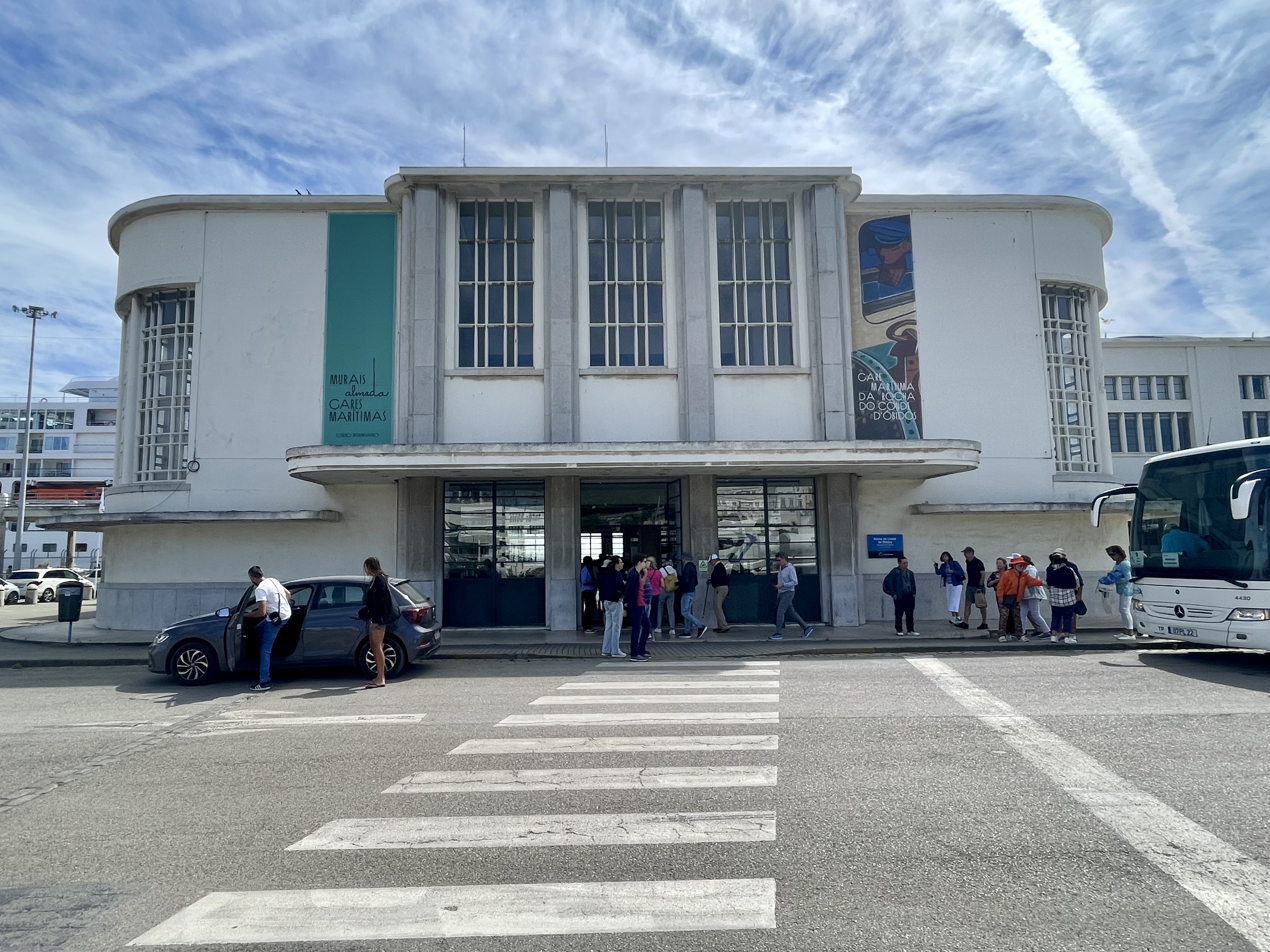
Rocha Conde de Óbidos terminal (2025)

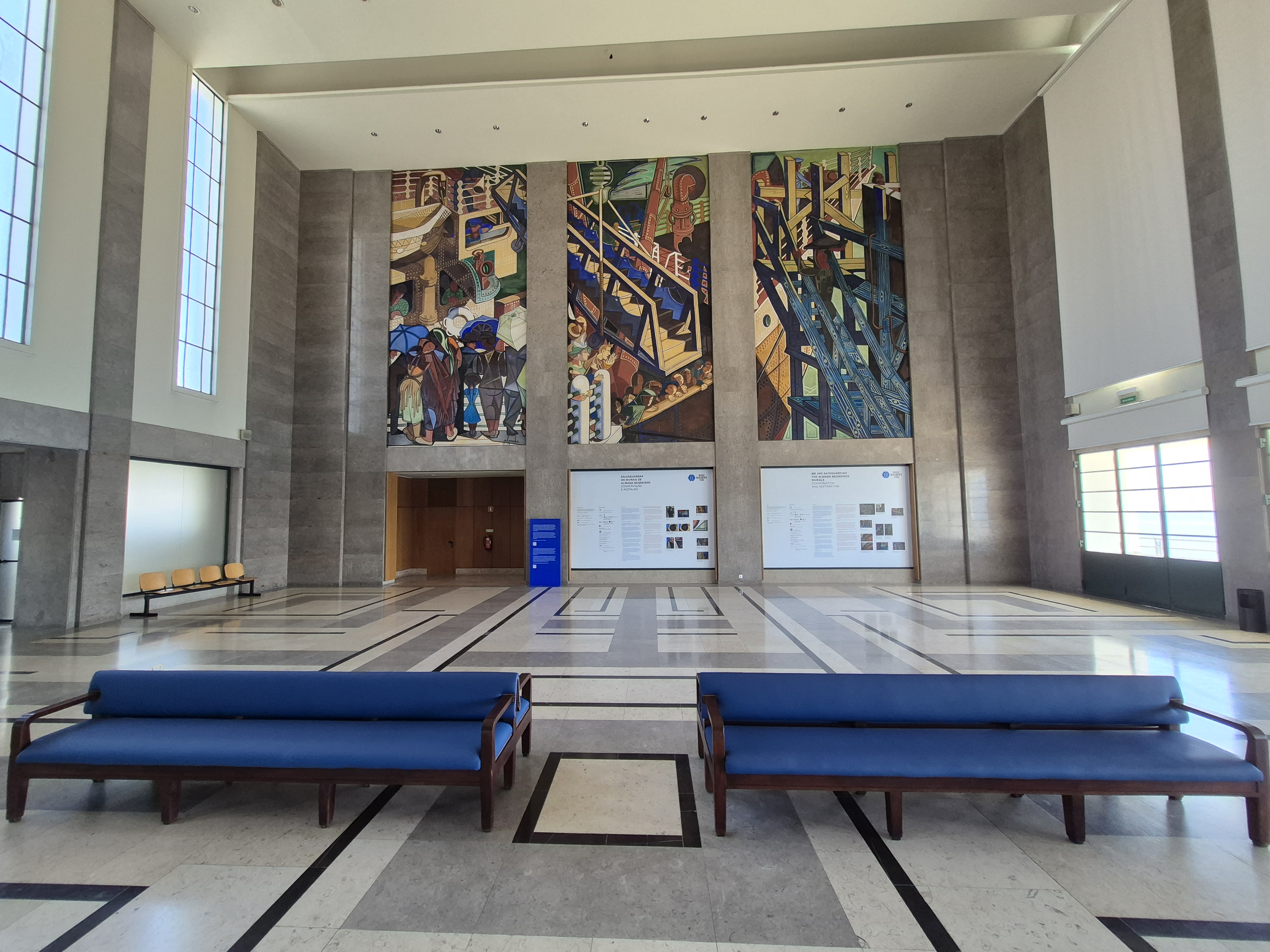
The upper floor of the Rocha Conde de Óbidos terminal

The paintings are in what official documents call the "vestibule", but which became known as the "grand hall". This was the area where first- and second-class passengers boarded and disembarked. At the Alcântara terminal, Negreiros could use eight areas each measuring 6.20 by 3.5 metres (20.3 ft × 11.5 ft). At the Rocha do Conde de Óbidos terminal, he had six areas measuring approximately 7.2 by 3.8 metres (24 ft × 12 ft) each. At this second terminal, Negreiros enlisted the help of his wife, the painter Sarah Affonso. She was the one who gradually enlarged the sketches until they were to scale and helped with the process of transferring them to the wall. The paintings Negreiros created for the two stations are very different from each other, but they have in common the fact that they include depictions of riverside life and the poverty associated with the professions that could be observed along the Tagus river. His paintings for the Alcântara terminal, completed in 1945, consist of two triptychs, Nau Catrineta (Ship Catrineta) and Quem não viu Lisboa não viu coisa boa (Whoever has not seen Lisbon has not seen anything good), and two separate paintings. The murals at the Rocha do Conde de Óbidos terminal, completed in 1949, consist of two triptychs, Domingo Lisboeta (Lisbon Sunday) and Partida de Emigrantes (Departure of Emigrants). The social criticism in all the paintings for a time raised the possibility that the Estado Novo would have them destroyed.

The Negreiros panels have required considerable and complex restoration work. They are vulnerable to occasional water infiltration and are also at risk from the surrounding salt water. Restoration was first done in 1979 and again in 2000. The World Monuments Fund has recently funded further work, starting at the Rocha do Conde de Óbidos terminal.

== Present situation ==
Despite initial opposition from the Port of Lisbon, the terminals were classified as Monuments of Public Interest in 2012. Both can now be visited and the Alcântara terminal also contains an interpretation centre that gives the history of the terminals and the murals. The terminals are managed by the Port of Lisbon.
