= Hotel Ritz =

Hotel Ritz may refer to:

- The Ritz Hotel, London
- Hôtel Ritz Paris
- Hotel Ritz (Barcelona)
- Hotel Ritz (Buenos Aires) (es:Hotel Ritz (Buenos Aires))
- Hotel Ritz (Cape Town)
- Hotel Ritz (Lisbon)
- Ritz Hotel, Madrid
- Ritz-Carlton Montreal
- The Ritz-Carlton Hotel Company
- Ritz Hotel Hyderabad now known as Hill Fort Palace
