= Church of Our Lady of the Rosary of Fátima =

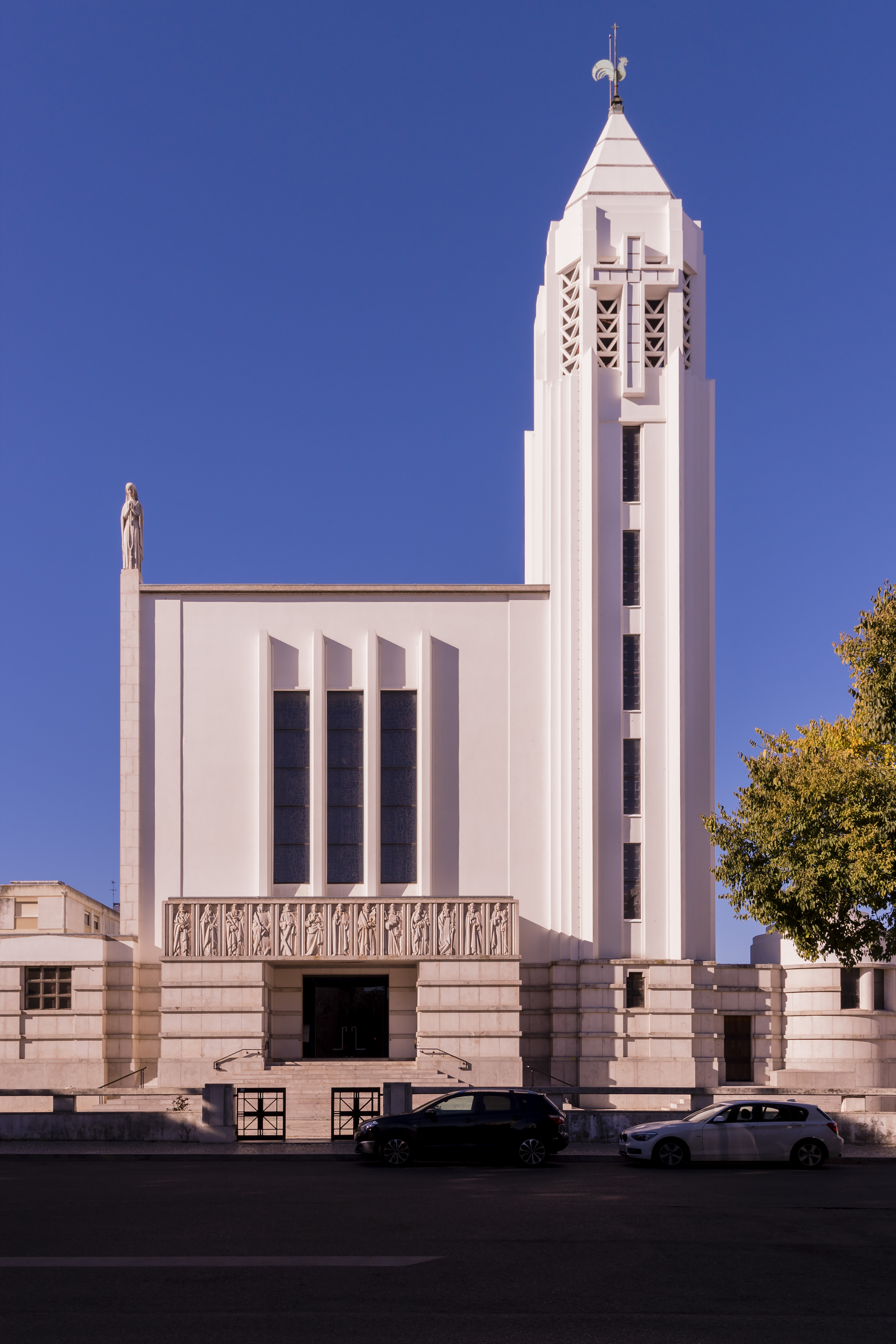
- Church of Our Lady of the Rosary of Fátima
- 38°44′22.73″N 9°9′3.05″W
- Location: Lisbon
- Country: Portugal
- Denomination: Roman Catholic

Architecture
- Architect: Porfírio Pardal Monteiro
- Style: Modern architecture
- Groundbreaking: 1934
- Completed: 1938

The Church of Our Lady of the Rosary of Fátima (Igreja de Nossa Senhora do Rosário de Fátima) is a Catholic church located in the parish of Avenidas Novas, formerly the parish of Our Lady of Fátima, in the city of Lisbon, Portugal. Designed by Porfírio Pardal Monteiro and consecrated in 1938, it was the first church to be built in Lisbon after the establishment of the Portuguese Republic in 1910. The building is a major example of Portuguese modern architecture or modernism.

== History ==
The project was commissioned from Pardal Monteiro in 1933. Design was carried out by Monteiro as well as Raul Rodrigues Lima and students working in Monteiro's studio, including João Faria da Costa. The church was consecrated in October 1938, and Monteiro received the Valmor Prize for architecture in that year. Despite the Catholic Church's support, the building's modernity would be challenged by the most conservative sectors of Portuguese society.

Artists who collaborated with the design included Francisco Franco (Frieze of the Apostles in the entrance portico), Almada Negreiros (stained glass windows), Leopoldo de Almeida (sculpture of the Virgin and the shepherd children of Fátima; Resurrection of Saint Lazarus; Saint John the Baptist), Salvador Barata Feyo, Artur Anjos Teixeira, Raul Xavier, António da Costa, Henrique Franco (mural painting of the Stations of the Cross), and Lino António (frescoes of the arches and high choir, considered the first frescoes in a modern public building in Portugal).

== Design ==
The site was chosen because of its central position in the parish. Construction began in 1934. The church consists of three stepped naves, the central one being the widest, without columns, pillars, or any other structural element that would obstruct the view of the altar. It is approximately 18 metres wide and can accommodate up to eight hundred people. Adjoining the central nave are six chapels, three on each side. The baptistery and bell tower, which is 45 metres high, are adjoined to the right side, with a narrow chancel and several outbuildings adjoining the rear façade. The church facades are covered by a high base of projecting grey stonework, crowned by slabs of the same material, interrupted equidistantly by projecting limestone friezes. The main façade, facing east, is marked on its left side by a corner higher than the building, where an image of the patron saint is erected, in limestone masonry, evoking the Art Deco style.

The church's interior consists of four vestibules in each corner, clad in stonework with flat ceilings and flagstone floors. It has a main entrance door and another for access to the annexes. It has three naves of eight bays, the first occupied by the high choir, separated by wide stone pillars, where the gilded consecration crosses appear. The walls feature high stone wainscoting, with the upper area and ceilings painted blue. The floor is limestone, with parquet flooring in the area of the congregation's benches. There are polygonal black marble holy water fonts with a niche of the same shape set on a corbel. There is a large organ above the choir, illuminated by stained-glass windows. The stained-glass windows in the naves feature images of the Virgin Mary, along with ten invocations and biblical or secular scenes. Each of the side naves opens onto three polygonal chapels, lined with breccia from Arrábida Natural Park, illuminated by two stained-glass windows depicting censers. The high altar is made of stonework. The space that houses the altar is covered by a flat ceiling featuring the figure of the Holy Spirit against a blue background.

Next to the church is the parish centre, where various activities can take place. Adjacent to it is a five-story building that also houses various functions, including the catechism room, party hall, refectory, kitchen, guesthouse, and the parish priest's house, accessed to the south through a grated porch.

== Gallery ==
Exterior

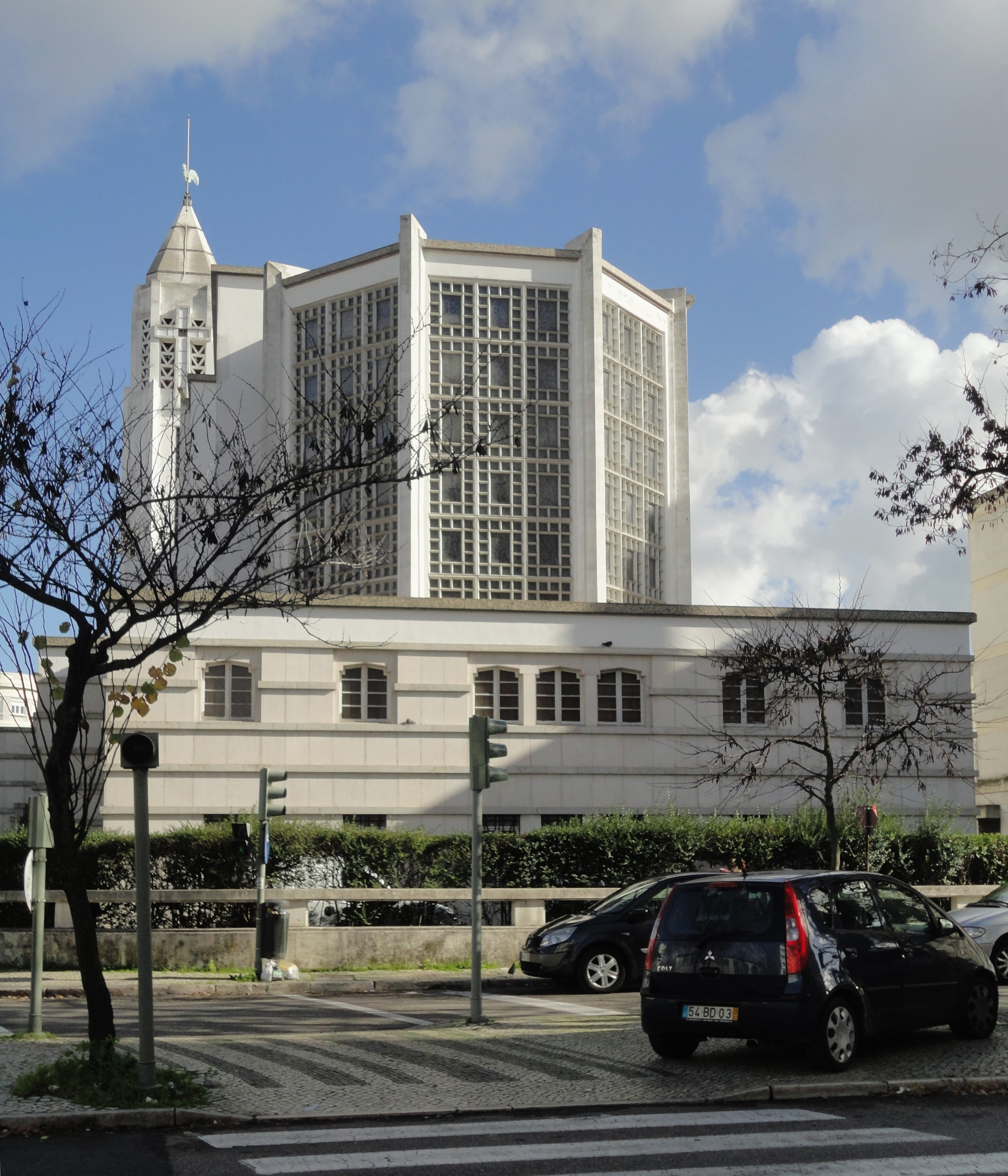
Exterior

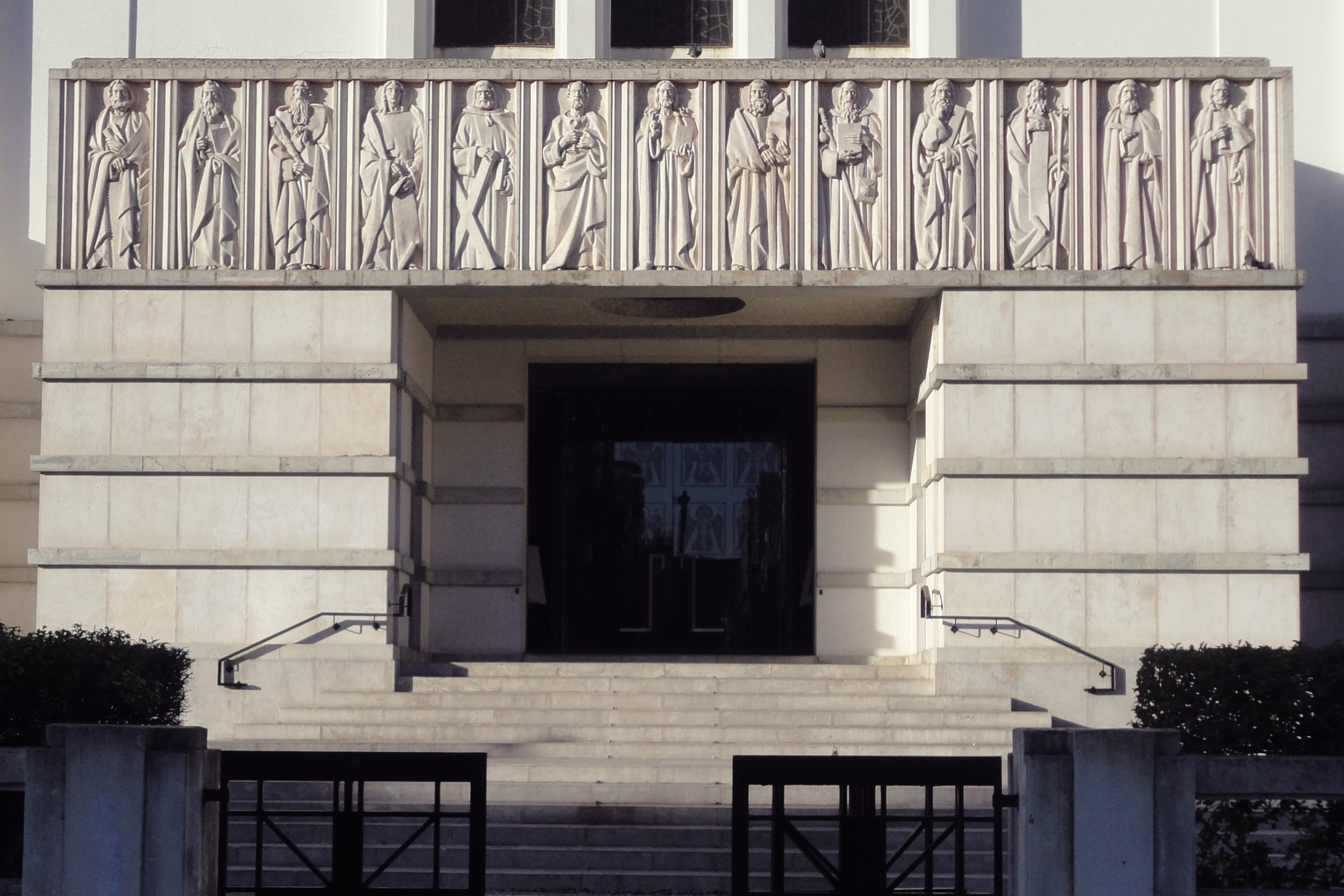
Entrance portico: Frieze of the Apostles by Francisco Franco

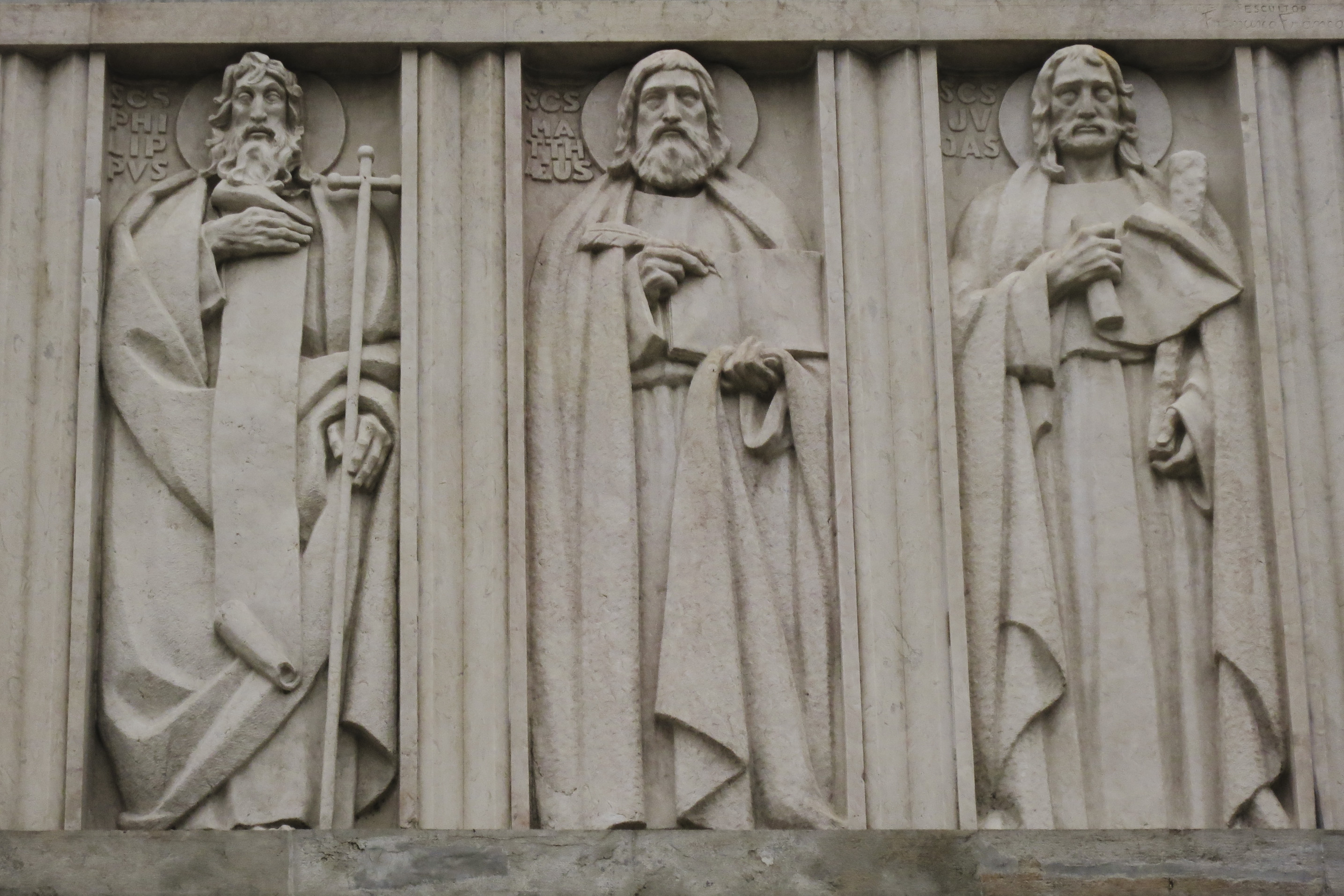
Francisco Franco, Frieze of the Apostles (fragment)

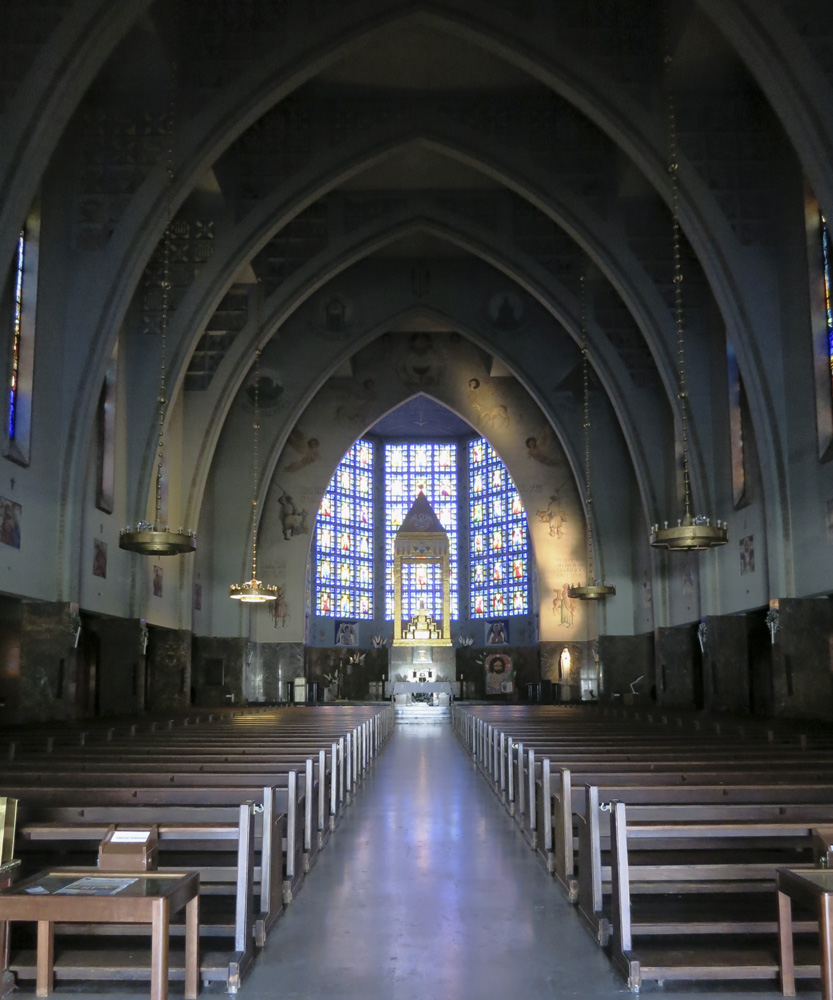
Interior

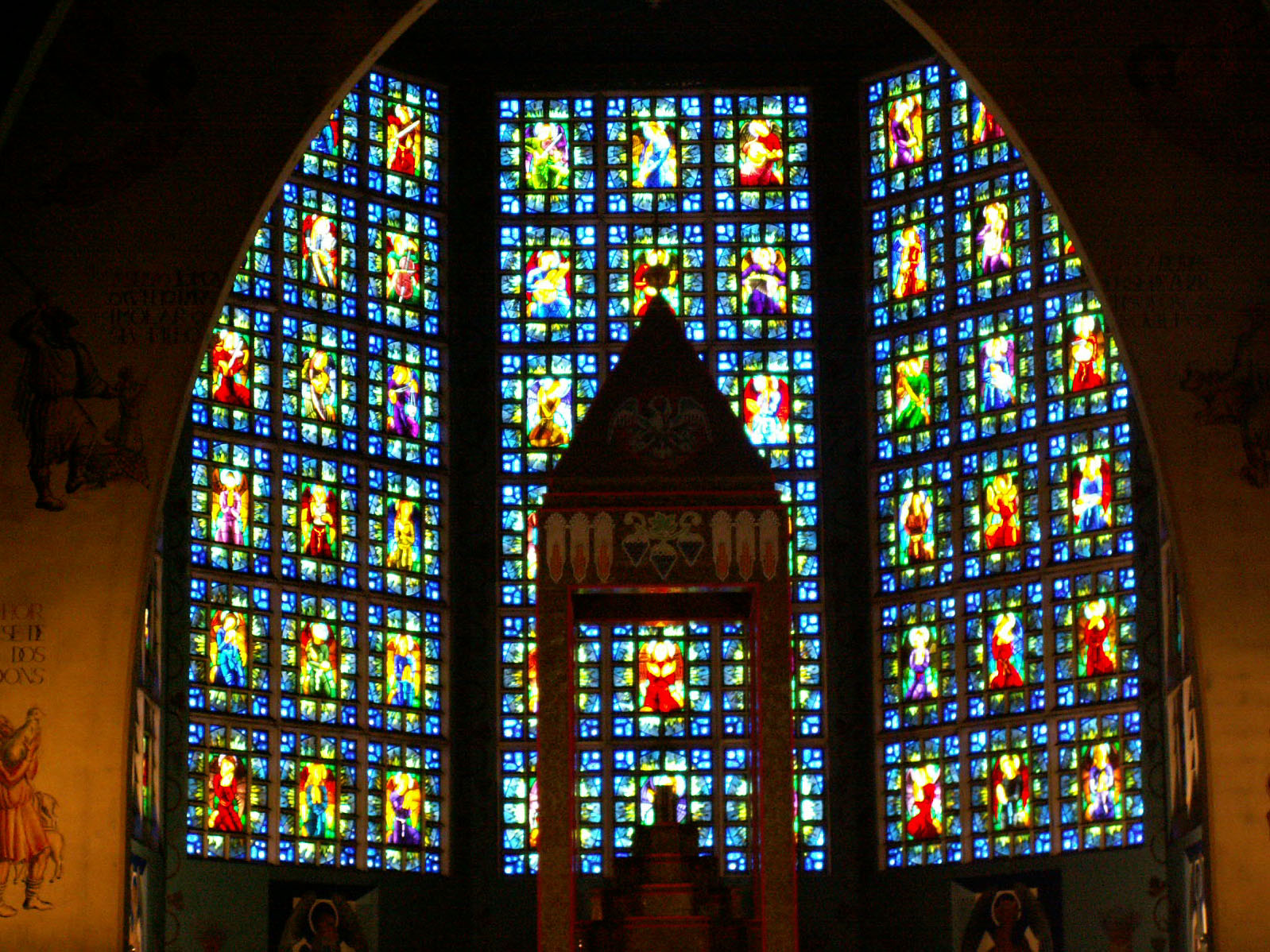
Stained glass by Almada Negreiros

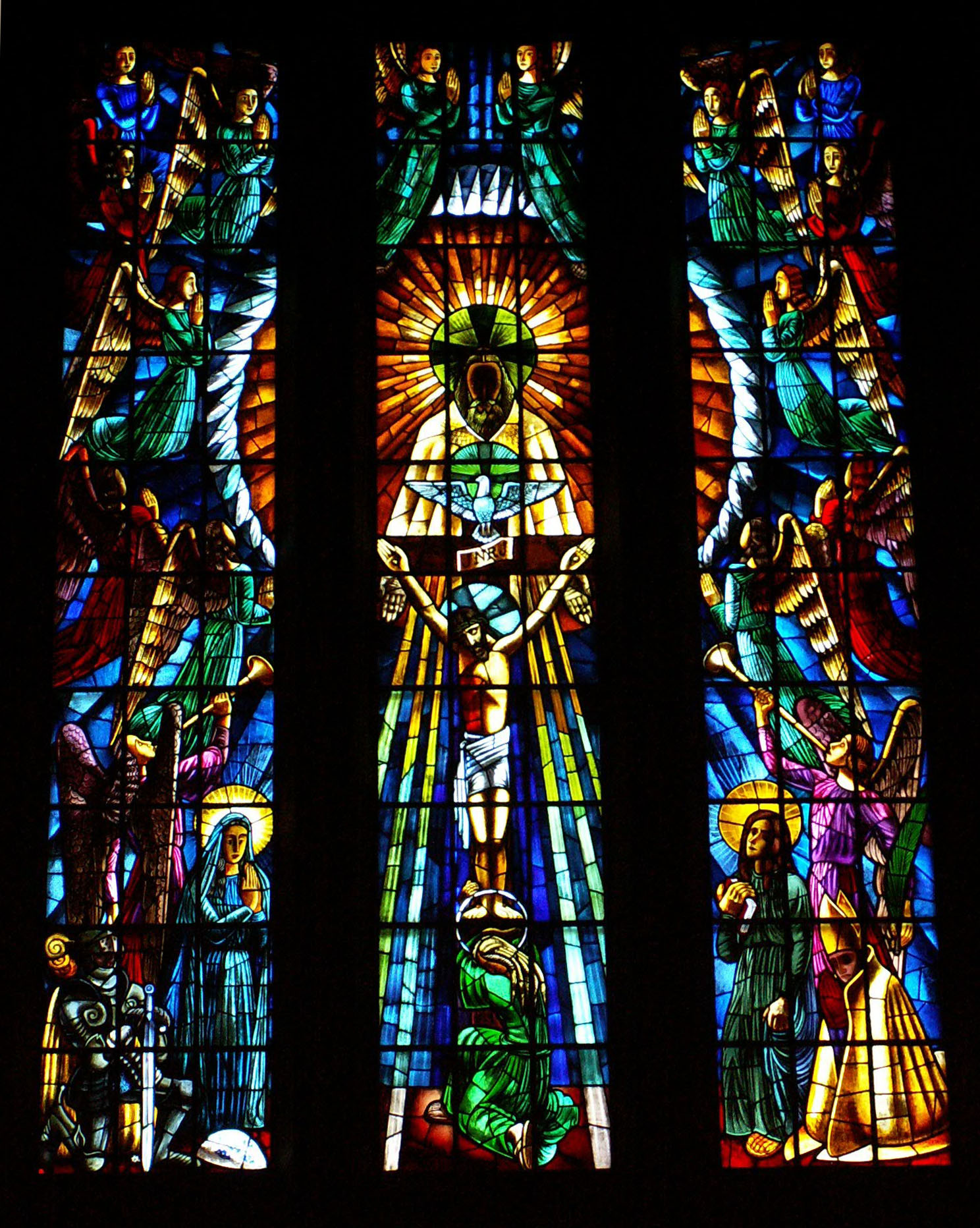
Stained glass by Almada Negreiros

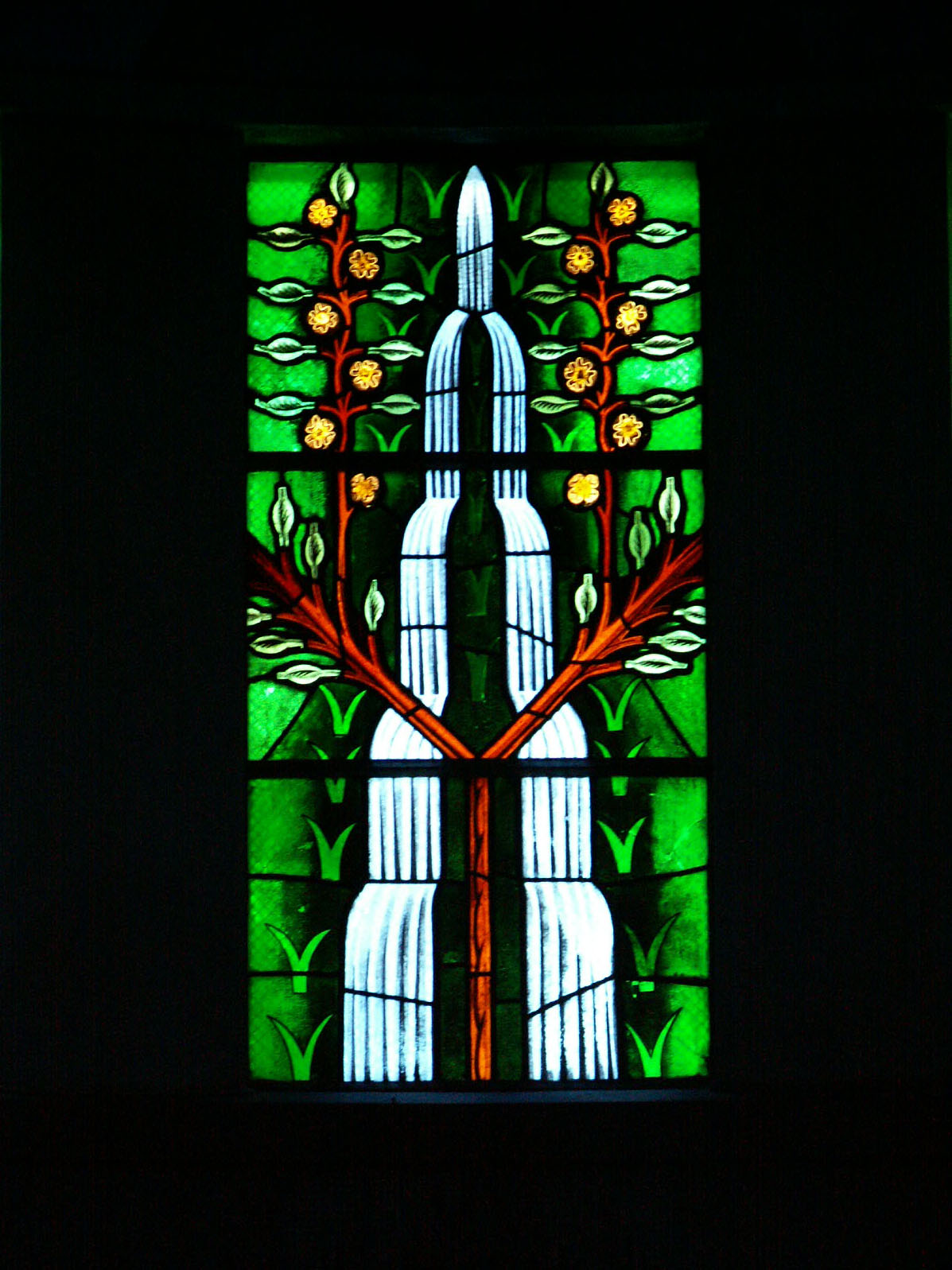
Stained glass by Almada Negreiros

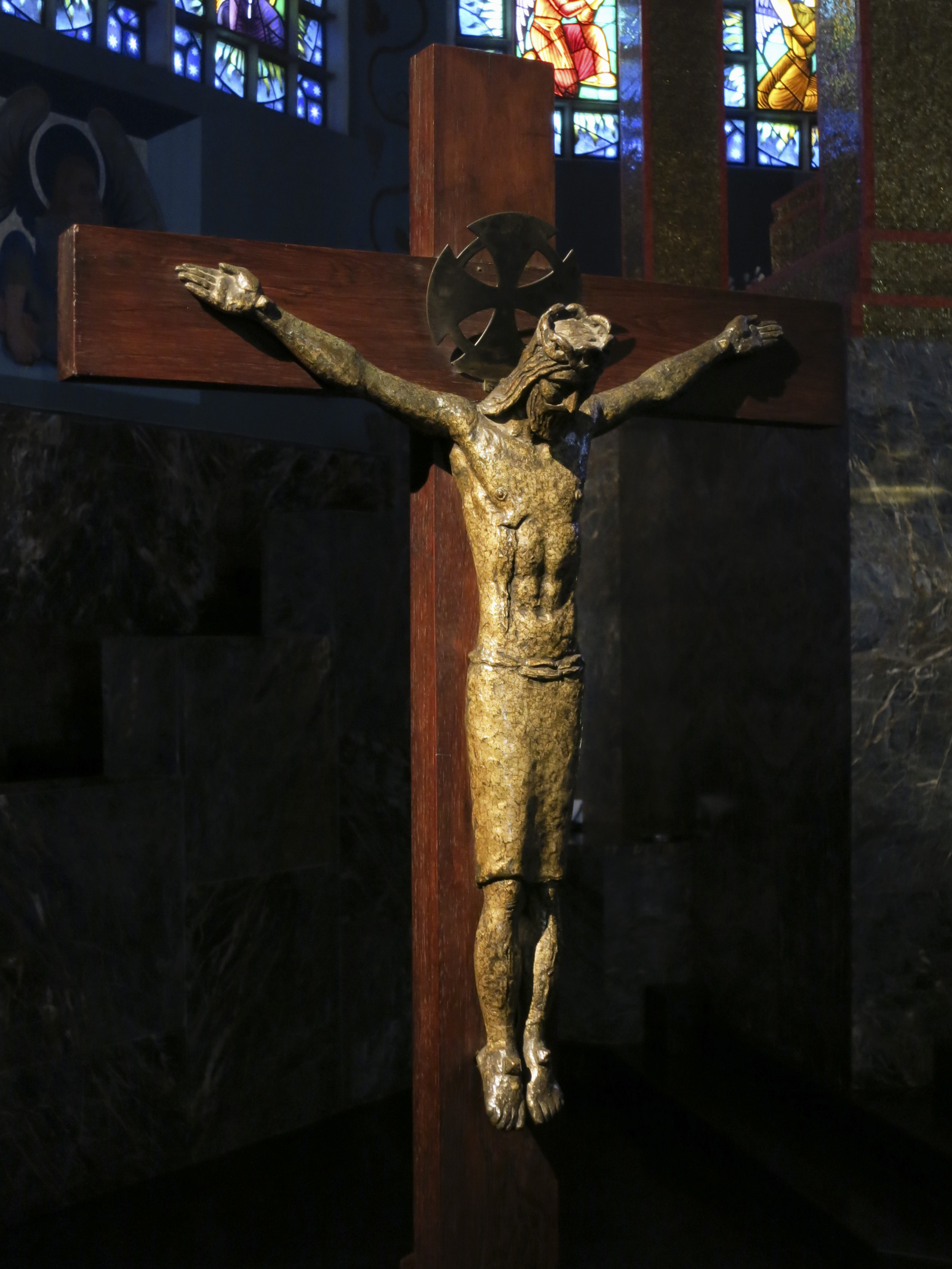
Barata Feyo, Christ on the Cross

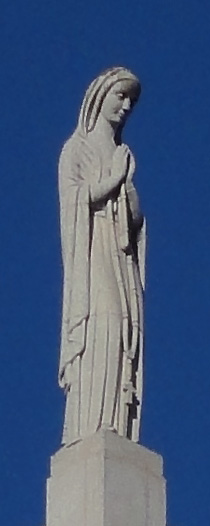
António da Costa, Our Lady of Fátima
