= Museu de Arte Popular =

- Museu de Arte Popular
- Location: Lisbon, Portugal
- Coordinates: 38°41′37″N 9°12′30″W
- Type: Art museum

The Museu de Arte Popular is an Art museum in Lisbon, Portugal.

It was originally designed by Veloso Reis and João Simões for the Portuguese World Exhibition's popular life pavilion in 1940, and after the exhibition was refurbished and in 1948.

== Gallery ==
Entrance and arcaded wing

Main entrance

Exterior elevation facing the paved forecourt

Relief by Henrique Moreira depicting rural activities

Relief by Henrique Moreira depicting religious figures

Vida Rural reliefs by Júlio de Sousa

Another group of Vida Rural reliefs by Júlio de Sousa

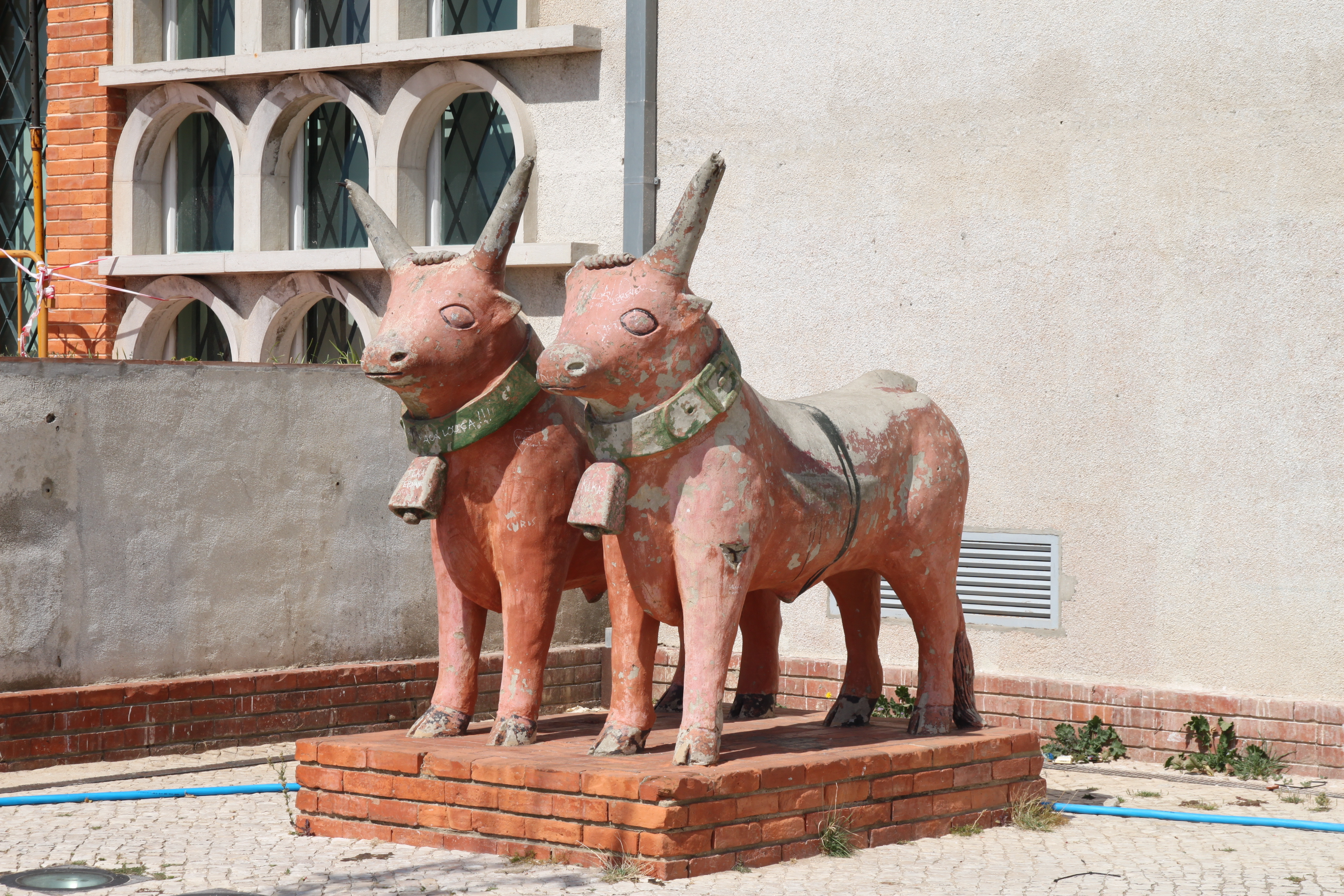
Sculpture of two oxen

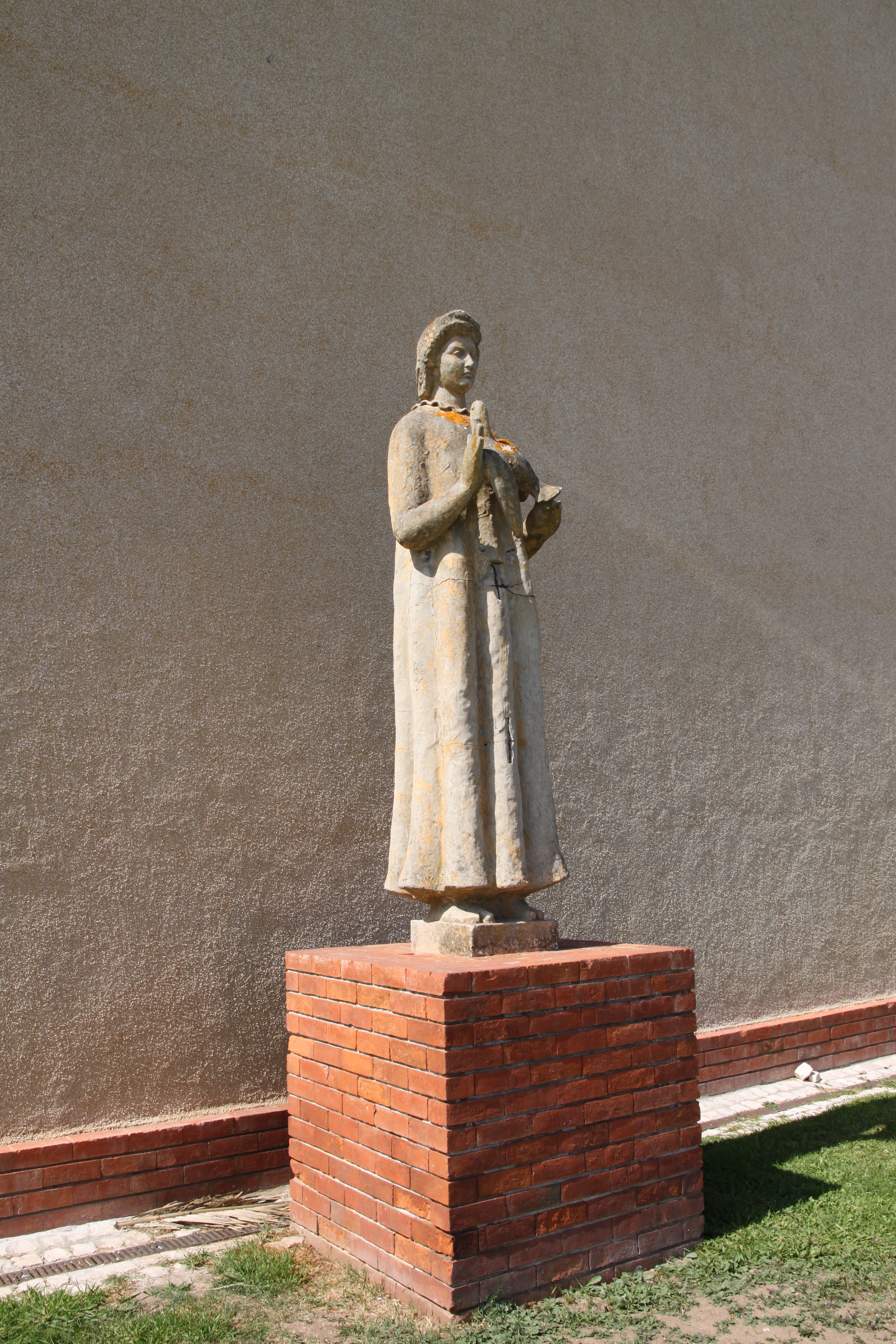
Sculpture by Adelina de Oliveira
