= Leopoldo de Almeida =

Portuguese modernist sculptor (1898–1975)

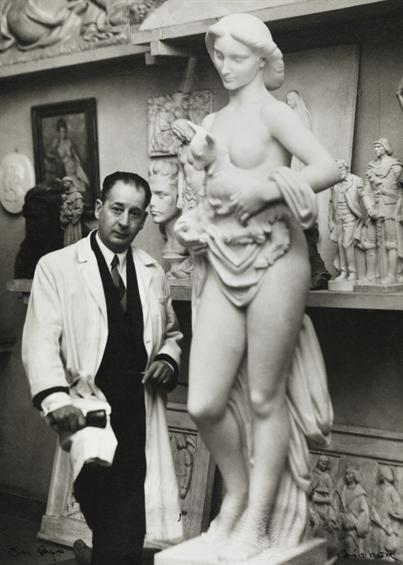
- Almeida in his studio
- Born: Leopoldo Neves de Almeida; 18 October 1898; Lisbon, Portugal
- Died: 28 April 1975 (aged 76); Lisbon
- Resting place: Prazeres Cemetery
- Education: Lisbon School of Fine Arts
- Known for: Sculpture
- Notable work: Monument of the Discoveries
- Movement: Modernist

Leopoldo Neves de Almeida (1898–1975) was a Portuguese sculptor and professor. Belonging to the second generation of Portuguese modernist artists and closely allied to the authoritarian Estado Novo government of the time, he is best known for his work on the Monument of the Discoveries in Lisbon.

== Early life ==
Almeida was born on 18 October 1898, in the parish of Anjos in Lisbon. He was the son of a woodturner, Eduardo Neves de Almeida, a native of Cartaxo, and Joana Tristão Neves, from Beja. He attended the Escola Oficina No. 1 school, where he was introduced to drawing and sculpture. In 1913, he enrolled in the general drawing course at the Lisbon School of Fine Arts and, three years later, in the special sculpture course at the same institution, which he completed in 1920. At the Lisbon School of Fine Arts, he was a classmate of Jorge Barradas and Porfírio Pardal Monteiro, among others. His teachers included José Simões de Almeida, Luciano Freire and Columbano Bordalo Pinheiro.

== Early career ==
In 1924, Almeida participated in public competitions for the first time, for the Monument to the Fallen of the Great War in Lisbon, in partnership with architect Luís Cristino da Silva. They won the third prize. The following year, he participated in the decoration of the Bristol Club, a night club renovated by Carlos João Chambers Ramos, with contributions by several other artists. He exhibited at the 1926 National Society of Fine Arts (SNBA) Autumn Salon. That same year, he spent four months in Paris, attending the Académie de la Grande Chaumière, before going to Rome, where he would stay until 1929. He held a solo exhibition at the Pensionato Artístico de Santo António dos Portugueses in Rome.

== Return to Portugal ==
On his return to Portugal in 1929 he presented several works at the SNBA 1929 exhibition, including The Faun, which earned him the First Class Medal in Sculpture. He then collaborated with the completion of the monument to the Marquis of Pombal in the middle of the Marquis of Pombal Square in Lisbon. By this time his father had died and Almeida was the sole breadwinner for his family and took whatever commercial work was available to him. In 1930 he participated in the "First Salon of Independents" in Lisbon, together with the most innovative Portuguese artists of the time. In 1932 he married Marina de Sousa Neves e Castro (Rio de Janeiro, c. 1907), a domestic worker. Their daughter, Helena Almeida, became a well-respected photographer and artist.

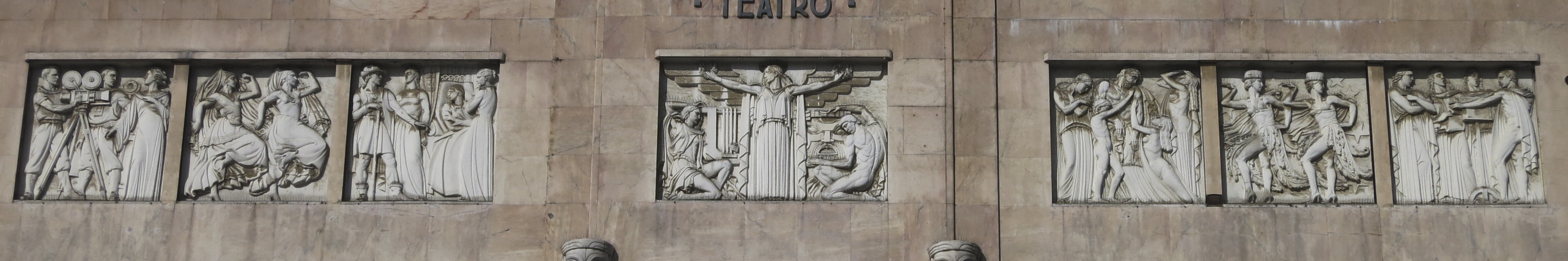
Bas-relief, c. 1934, Cineteatro Éden, Lisbon

In 1932, Almeida began to teach drawing at SNBA, beginning his teaching career. Two years later, after winning an official competition, he began teaching drawing at the Lisbon School of Fine Arts, later also teaching sculpture, continuing to work there until 1965. In 1934, he created bas-reliefs for the façade of the Cineteatro Éden, which was undergoing renovation under the architect Cassiano Branco. He then created pieces for the new Church of Our Lady of the Rosary of Fátima, designed by Porfírio Pardal Monteiro and inaugurated in 1938. This was followed by statues of the Portuguese president Óscar Carmona, presented at the 1939 New York World's Fair, and of the prime minister António de Oliveira Salazar, which was erected in his birthplace of Santa Comba Dão in 1939. Almeida then became involved with the 1940 Portuguese World Exhibition, working with the architect José Ângelo Cottinelli Telmo on the Monument of the Discoveries. This represented a romanticized idealization of the Portuguese exploration that was typical of the Estado Novo regime of Salazar. The monument was designed by Telmo to represent the prow of a ship and Almeida developed 33 sculptures representing monarchs, explorers, cartographers, artists, scientists and missionaries. However, the original structure was demolished by mid-1943. Between 1958 and 1960, the present monument was constructed on the same site in cement and rose-tinted stone, with the statues being sculpted from limestone. The new project was enlarged from the original 1940 model as part of the commemorations to celebrate the fifth centennial of the death of Prince Henry the Navigator. Almeida was again involved, together with other sculptors working under his direction.

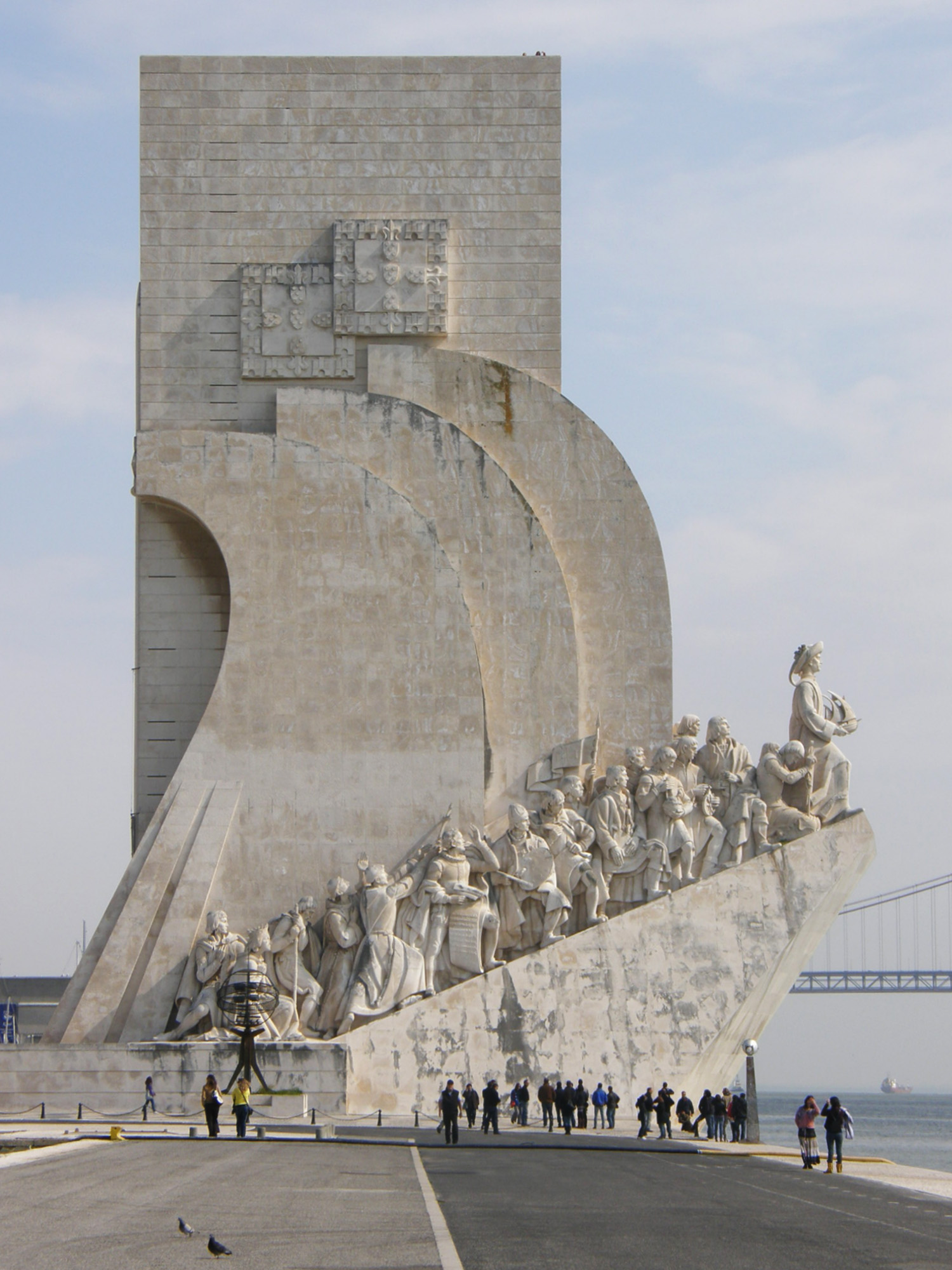
Monument of the Discoveries

In 1954, he began to make significant donations of his works to the José Malhoa Museum in Caldas da Rainha. He is also represented in numerous collections, both public and private, including the Centro de Arte Moderna Gulbenkian, the National Museum of Contemporary Art of Chiado and the Museum of Lisbon.

== Awards and honours ==
In 1940, Almeida was awarded the Medal of Honour from the SNBA and the Soares dos Reis Prize from the National Propaganda Secretariat. He received the Medal of Merit from the Portuguese Red Cross in 1973. He was made a Commander of the Military Order of Saint James of the Sword in 1941, and was elevated to Grand Officer of this order in 1970. He was made a Commander of the Order of Public Instruction in 1957.

== Death ==
Almeida died in Lisbon on 28 April 1975, from a cerebral thrombosis. He was buried in the Prazeres Cemetery.

== Works ==
Almeida's works included:

- 1927. The Faun. National Museum of Contemporary Art of Chiado.
- 1934. Bas-reliefs. Facade of the Cineteatro Éden, Lisbon.
- 1935–37. Monument to António José de Almeida, Lisbon (in collaboration with Porfírio Pardal Monteiro).
- 1940. Monument to the Discoveries, (current version: 1960), Belém, Lisbon (in collaboration with Cottinelli Telmo).
- 1940. Óscar Carmona. Garden of the Museum of Lisbon.
- 1946. Monument to King Sancho I, Castle of Silves.
- 1947. The Family. Gardens of the Presidency of the Council of Ministers, Lisbon.
- 1948–49. Ramalho Ortigão. Cordoaria Garden, Porto.
- 1950. Afonso I of Portugal. Campo Grande, Lisbon.
- 1950. King João I. Campo Grande, Lisbon.
- 1952. Eça de Queiroz. Póvoa de Varzim.
- 1956. Marcelino Mesquita, Cartaxo.
- 1956. António Feliciano de Castilho. Avenida da Liberdade, Lisbon.
- 1960. Justice. Palace of Justice, Porto.
- 1961. Equestrian statue of Nuno Álvares Pereira. Batalha.
- 1974. Monument to Calouste Gulbenkian. Gardens of the Calouste Gulbenkian Foundation, Lisbon.
