= Escola Secundária Artística António Arroio =

Secondary school in Lisbon, Portugal

Location
- Portugal; 38.736111°N 9.127222°W

Information
- Type: Secondary School
- Established: 1919
- Website: www.antonioarroio.pt

The Escola Artística António Arroio (António Arroio School of Arts) is a secondary school in Lisbon, Portugal that specializes in the applied arts.

== History ==
The school was founded in 1919 as the Escola de Arte Aplicada de Lisboa (Applied Art School of Lisbon). The patron of the school, Antonio José Arroyo (1856–1934), was an engineer by profession who wrote about literature, music and fine arts. He was also a school inspector, and was devoted to the cause of technical education and the applied arts. It was designated a specialist school for pupils who wanted to engage in industrial art, with a curriculum that included workshop-based training in the arts. Alfredo Roque Gameiro was the head of the school until 1930, when it was merged into the Fonseca Benevides industrial school.

The school was reopened in 1934 to meet student demand for a school of applied art. The school was named after the original founder as the Escola Industrial António Arroio (arte aplicada) (António Arroio Industrial School (applied arts)). It was located in a building on Rua Almirante Barroso that had been built for the António Augusto Gonçalves ceramics school, founded in 1924, with which it merged. The school was headed by Falcon Trigoso, and in a five-year course covered ceramics, stone carving, lithographic design and other skills as well as fine arts. When technical education was reformed in 1948 the school became the Escola de Artes Decorativas António Arroio (António Arroio School of Decorative Arts), directed by Rogério de Andrade. The painter Lino António became director in 1953 and overhauled the curriculum to include fine arts, lithography, decorative painting, sculpture and pottery, carving and artistic furniture.

With growing numbers of students the school had to move a section to another building. In 1970 it finally moved to the building it occupies today. The curriculum continued to evolve to accommodate changing needs. Recent additions have included artistic production, audiovisual communication, communication design and product design. In February 2012 President Aníbal Cavaco Silva cancelled a planned visit to the school due to student protests about the conditions in the school and the price of transport passes. The students hold a small Carnival parade every year with costumes that combine art and fashion.

== Building ==
The school is located in central Lisbon, with its main access from Rua Coronel Ferreira do Amaral. A major overhaul to the building began in 2009 to create additional space. The new 20,610 square metres (221,800 sq ft) building was designed by the Aires Mateus architectural firm. It is a compact cluster of several interlinked buildings of different heights, each with several floors. The new building was partially opened in November 2011 after various difficulties. Defects in the €21 million new construction project caused infiltration of water into the gym and changing room in 2013. On 30 September 2014 José Luís Ferreira of the "Greens" parliamentary group asked in parliament about the lack of classes and of a cafeteria, both of which were causing student protests, due to delays in completion of the work.

== Sources ==
- Clara Viana (2 April 2013). "Erros nas obras da Parque Escolar deixam António Arroio sem aulas de Educação Física". Público (in Portuguese).
- "Escola Secundária Artística "António Arroio"". afaconsult.
- "Historial da escola". Escola Artística António Arroio. Archived from the original on 14 April 2015.
- Inês Silva (8 February 2013). "Escola António Arroio desfila o seu carnaval no Marquês". Diário de Notícias Portugal.
- José Luís Ferreira (30 September 2014). "Falta de condições na Escola Secundária Artística António Arroio motiva pergunta do PEV no Parlamento" (in Portuguese). Partido Ecologista "Os Verdes". Archived from the original on 14 April 2015.
- "Protestos na escola António Arroio cancelam visita de Cavaco". Jornal de Notícias. 16 February 2012.
