= Sarah Affonso =

Portuguese artist, illustrator (1899–1983)

- Born: 13 May 1899; Lisbon, Portugal
- Died: 14 December 1983 (aged 84); Lisbon, Portugal
- Known for: Painting
- Movement: Modernism
- Spouse: Almada Negreiros

Sarah Affonso, the art name used by Sara Sancha Afonso, (1899–1983) was a Portuguese artist and illustrator who was brought up in the Minho Region in the north of the country. Adopting a modernist style, she painted scenes of rural life in her childhood province and portraits of peasant women. Although she exhibited in Paris in the late 1920s, her most important paintings date from the 1930s. She was largely forgotten until her work was presented in 2019 at Lisbon's Calouste Gulbenkian Museum.

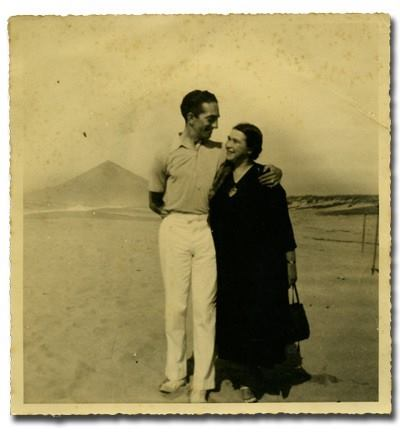
Sara and Almada Negreiros on Moledo Beach, 1 September 1934

== Biography ==
Born in Lisbon on 13 May 1899, Sara Sancha Afonso spent her childhood in a modest home in Viana do Castelo in the north-west of Portugal where she attended the Colégio de Nossa Senhora de Monserrate. On returning to Lisbon with her parents in 1915, she studied at the Fine Arts School under Columbano Pinheiro, graduating in 1922.

In 1924, she spent eight months in Paris attending lectures at the Académie de la Grande Chaumière. She was particularly impressed by an exhibition of works by Matisse, as can be seen from her 1924 paintings As Meninas and Anemones in Lisbon's Museu do Chiado.

She participated in the SNBA's Autumn Exhibitions in 1925 and 1926 while working as an illustrator of children's books and for the press. Above all, she devoted her time to embroidery and knitting. After a well-received solo exhibition at the Salon Bobonne in 1928, she returned to Paris where she earned a living sewing clothes. She returned to Lisbon in 1929, where over the next few years she presented works in several collective exhibitions, receiving reasonably positive reviews.

In September 1933, she returned to her father's village in the Minho region where she was inspired by scenes reminiscent of her childhood years. She is remembered in particular for her works from this period which depict peasant girls, cattle and green hills as well as women nursing or working in the fields.

On March 31, 1934, she married the painter José de Almada Negreiros with whom she had two children. After continuing painting scenes from Minho in the early years of her marriage, she spent most of her time raising a family. However, she occasionally assisted her husband in his work, as in his murals for a new ocean liner terminal for Lisbon, when she gradually enlarged the sketches until they were to scale and then helped with the process of transferring them to the wall. In the late 1950s, she returned to book illustration.

In June 1982, President António Ramalho Eanes honoured her with the Order of Saint James of the Sword. She died in Lisbon on 14 December 1983.

Though she gave up painting in 1939, strained by the demands of motherhood, the artist was in the spotlight in 2019. Two exhibitions in Lisbon -- 'Sarah Affonso and Folk Art from the Minho' at the Calouste Gulbenkian Museum and 'The Days of Small Things' at the Museu Nacional de Artre Contemporanea do Chiado -- featured her paintings, drawings, textiles, and ceramics. These works of art were inspired by the region in northern region of Portugal, Minho, where she grew up. The Gulbenkian exhibit opened with her first known drawing, made when she was 12 years old. The Chiado exhibit featured a panoramic view of her work and life, beginning with her first stay in Paris. Altogether, these exhibits featured more than 100 of her works, most from private collections never displayed publicly.
