= Sá Nogueira =

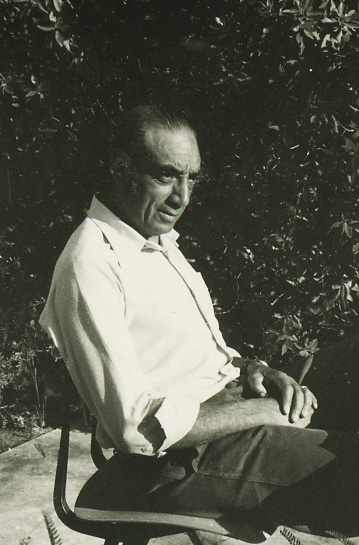
Sá Nogueira, 1977

Rolando Sá Nogueira, (Lisbon, May 19, 1921 – November 18, 2002), was one of the most important painters of his generation; according to José Augusto França, he belongs to the third wave of 20th Century modern Portuguese painters.

== Biography / Work ==
His early portraits – done whilst he was studying at the Lisbon School of Fine Arts –, closely related to Matisse and Modigliani; but he soon found his own voice, picturing the landscapes and the daily life of Lisbon's modern areas in personal, sensitive paintings, and distancing himself from the predominant currents in the Portuguese art world of the 1940s and 1950s.

Between 1962 and 1964 he studied in Birmingham and at the Slade School of Fine Art, London. This put him in touch with the early manifestations of Pop Art; and in London he was influenced by the 1963 Kurt Schwitters’ exhibition at the Marlborough gallery. After returning to Portugal his work deeply changed; his pictorial space got closer to cubism and he started using collage and photo sensitized canvas.

Without rupture or break, from the 1980s onwards his work evolved, and returned to more traditional pictorial values and to a type of narrative often closer to his 1950's work.

Sá Nogueira exhibited extensively along the years, both in group and in one person exhibitions; in 1998 he held a large retrospective exhibition at the Chiado Museum, Lisbon. And he was a highly influential drawing teacher – from 1965 onwards he taught at Sociedade Nacional de Belas Artes, Lisbon, at the Oporto School of Fine Arts, at the Lisbon Faculty of Architecture, etc. -, influencing a whole generation of younger Portuguese artists (Pedro Calapez, Manuel Botelho, among many others).

== Bibliography ==
- NOGUEiRA, Sá – Sá Nogueira: retrospectiva. Lisbon: Chiado Museum, 1998,
