= Lino António =

Portuguese artist

Lino António da Conceição
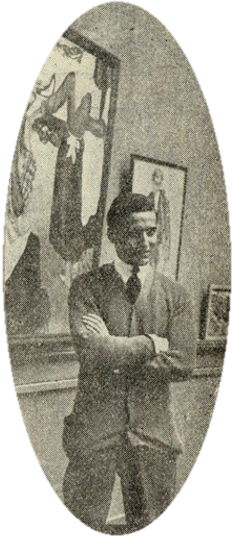
- Born: 26 November 1898; Leiria, Portugal
- Died: 23 October 1974 (aged 75); Lisbon, Portugal
- Occupation: Artist
- Known for: Modernist frescoes

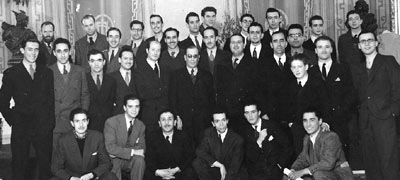
The Independents (1944). António is in the 2nd row, fourth from the right.

Lino António da Conceição (26 November 1898 – 23 October 1974) was a Portuguese artist known for his Modernist paintings. He made many friezes, frescos, stained glass and ceramic panels for public buildings and private collections in Portugal. He taught in several schools and was director for many years at the Escola Secundária Artística António Arroio (António Arroio Secondary Arts School) in Lisbon, having an influence over hundreds of artists, mostly painters and designers.

== Life ==
Lino António da Conceição was born in Leiria on 26 November 1898. His parents were Lino António da Conceição and Maria do Carmo Pereira Dias da Conceição. He had two older sisters and two younger sisters. He spent time in the studio of his teacher and friend Narciso Costa. He took a course in Ornamental Design at the Industrial School of Domingos Sequeira in Leiria, then attended the Lisbon School of Fine Arts, where he was a brilliant student. On 1 October 1915 he enrolled at the Porto School of Fine Arts, where he studied under João Marques de Oliveira.

By 1917 António was attending the "modernist gatherings" of Porto students described by the sculptor Diogo de Macedo, often held in the Excelsior café. In 1918 he organized his first solo exhibition, in Leiria, where he showed his decorative style and modernist technique. He became port of a group that included the future architect António Varela, the artist Luís Fernandes, the poet Américo Durão and the doctor and writer Américo Cortez Pinto. António married Maria Helena de Noronha Tudela in the 1920s, and they had three children. His 1924 exhibition in Lisbon at the National Society of Fine Arts (SNBA) was praised by Contemporânea and Athena. His work at this show included the themes of coastal people, Nazareth and urban living to which he returned throughout his career. In the years that followed he participated in numerous exhibitions, made friezes, frescoes, stained glass and ceramic panels for various public buildings and illustrated several books.

António taught in the General Industrial and Commercial School of Marinha Grande, and then became a professor of mechanical design in the Machado de Castro Industrial School in Lisbon. By the end of the 1930s he was obtaining public orders for his work, which allowed him to live fairly comfortably. He was quoted as saying "Praise? I preferred an commission!" He began to teach at the Antonio Arroyo School of Decorative Arts in 1940. Among his students was the painter, sculptor and poet Figueiredo Sobral. He became director of the school in 1953 and overhauled the curriculum to include fine arts, lithography, decorative painting, sculpture and pottery, carving and artistic furniture. He was forced to retire due to his age in 1968. In 1974 he suffered a stroke while working in his studio, and died in hospital two days later on 23 October 1974.

== Work ==
Lino António was representative of the second generation of modernist artists. He liked vibrant colors and robust forms. His paintings show a strong sense of decoration. He explored themes of fishing (in Peixeiras na Praïa (Fishmongers on the beach, housed by the Soares dos Reis National Museum), religion and history in his panels and frescoes. In his later years he devoted himself to stained glass, mosaic and ceramic.

=== Exhibitions ===
António participated in over forty Salons and exhibitions, including:

- Modernist Salon (1919, 1926);
- Salão de Outono (Salon of Autumn, 1925, 1926);
- Ibero-American Exposition in Seville (1929 – medal of honor);
- Salon of Independents (1930, 1931);
- National Society of Fine Arts (1924, 1930, 1932, 1933, 1958, 1973);
- Colonial Exhibition in Paris (1931 – medal of honor);
- Salon of Winter (1932); Lisbon Festival (1934 – decorations);
- SNi Exhibition (1935);
- Exhibition of Year X of the National Revolution (1936);
- XXI Biennale di Venezia / Biennial of Venice (1938);
- Exhibition of Showcases (1940)
- Portuguese World Exhibition (1940)
- SPN Modern Art Exhibition (1943, 1944)
- SNI Exhibition of Polychromatic Ceramic Panels (1955)
- São Paulo Art Biennial(1951)
- Art Portugais, Paris (1968)

=== Public works ===
Antonio made friezes, frescoes, stained glass and ceramic panels for various public buildings, including:

- 1924: Bristol Club remodeling
- 1938: Frieze for the room of the President of the National Assembly
- 1938: Frescoes of the triumphal arch and the balcony of the choir of the Church of Our Lady of Fatima
- 1945: Stained glass windows for the Casa do Douro
- 1946(?): Stained glass windows for the Jeronimos Monastery
- 1946: Stained glass windows for the chapel of the Colégio das Escravas do Sagrado Coração de Jesus
- 1949: Frescos and stained glass for the Municipal Chamber of Vila Franca de Xira
- 1951: Frescos for the Church of Santo Eugénio in the Bairro of Encarnação
- 1952: Ceramic panels for the main lobby of the National Laboratory of Civil Engineering
- 1955: Ceramic panels for Fatima Sanctuary
- 1957: Frescos for the Great |Hall of the Municipality of Covilha
- 1957: Ceramic panel for the Faculty of Law, University of Lisbon
- 1958: Ceramic panel for the Pavilion of the Student Body of the Military Academy
- 1958: Panel and ceramic frieze for the Institute of Hygiene and Tropical Medicine
- 1961: Stained glass windows and the Grand Portico of the Aula Magna;
- 1966: Frescos for the main lobby of the National Library.
- 1966: Stained glass windows of the Seia Courthouse

=== Illustrations ===
Illustrations included:

- 1928 Illustrations and a cover for the magazine Civilização.
- 1938 Illustrations for the book Amadis by Afonso Vieira Lopes
- 1939 Illustrations for the book La Jeunesse Portugaise à l'École by António Mattoso.
- 1943 Illustrations for the book Life of Jesus by Pliny Salgado (Rocha Cabral prize).

Most of the books he illustrated were of the poet Sebastiao da Gama and Americo Cortezão

== Sources ==
- "Figueiredo Sobral". Manufactura de Tapeçarias de Portalegre.
- "Historial da escola". Escola Artística António Arroio. Archived from the original on 2015-04-14.
- Leandro, Sandra (2013). "Lino António: biografia". Lisboa: Centro de Arte Moderna da Fundação Calouste Gulbenkian.
- "Lino António (1898 - 1974)". Assembleia da República (Portugal).
- "Lino António biografia". Galeria Lino António. Archived from the original on 2006-11-09.
