= Duarte Pacheco =

Portuguese government minister

Minister of Public Works and Communications
- In office May 1938 – November 1943
- Prime Minister: António de Oliveira Salazar
- In office July 1932 – January 1936
- Prime Minister: António de Oliveira Salazar
- Preceded by: First person to hold the post

Minister of Public Instruction
- In office April 1928 – November 1928
- Prime Minister: José Vicente de Freitas

Personal details
- Born: Duarte José Pacheco; 19 April 1900 Loulé, Algarve, Portugal
- Died: 15 November 1943 (aged 43) Setúbal, Portugal
- Education: Faro Lyceum
- Alma mater: Instituto Superior Técnico, Lisbon

Duarte José Pacheco GCSE GCC (19 April 1900 — 16 November 1943) was a Portuguese engineer, minister of public works and mayor of Lisbon who made major improvements to the civil infrastructure of Portugal as a minister of the Estado Novo regime. He is considered to be one of the most notable Portuguese politicians of the 20th century.

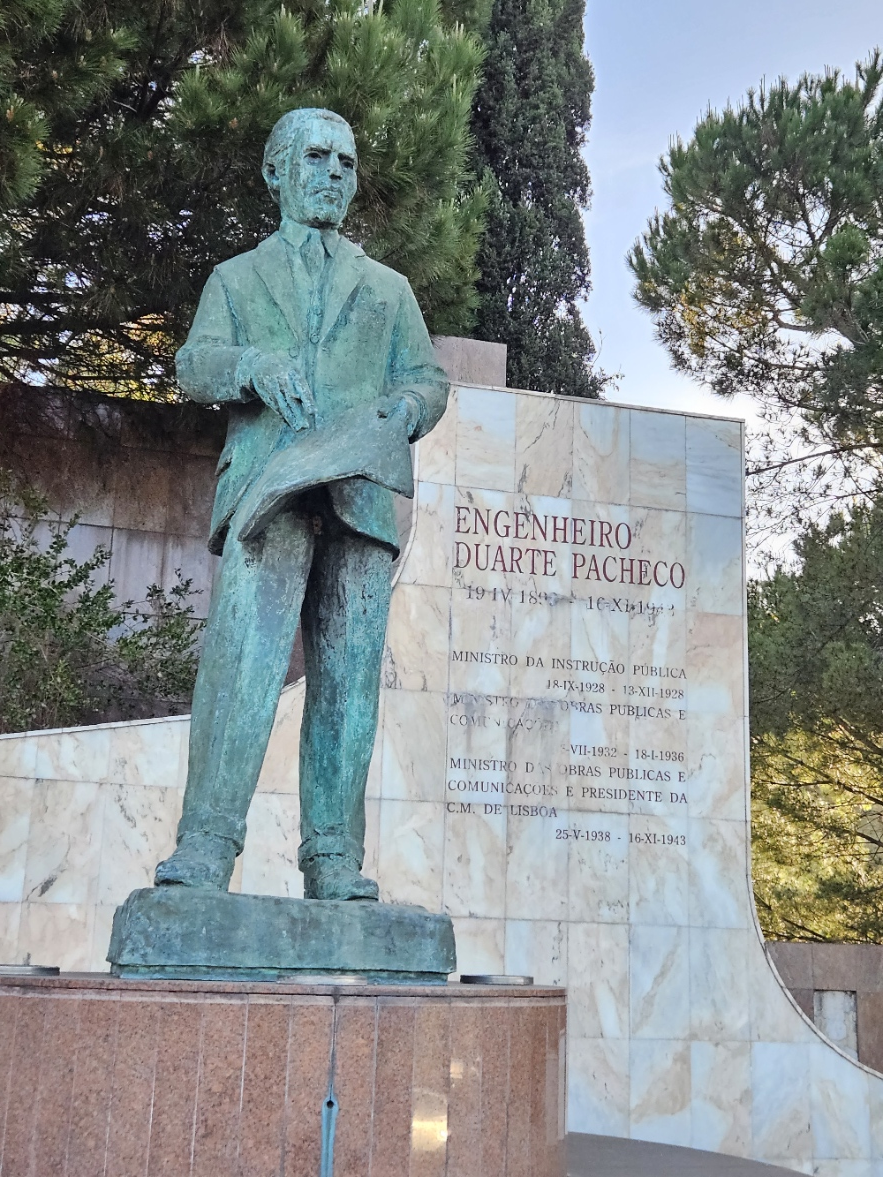
Monument to Pacheco in Lisbon

== Early life ==
Pacheco was born in Loulé in the Algarve region of Portugal. He was one of the youngest of four sons and seven daughters of José de Azevedo Pacheco, Police Commissioner of Loulé, and his wife Maria do Carmo Pontes Bota. His mother, from a rich family from Loulé, died in 1906, and the following year his father was transferred to Horta on Faial Island in the Azores, leaving the family in the Algarve, under the care of the eldest sister, Sofia. He would return to the Algarve but die in 1914. Duarte Pacheco was born on 19 April 1900 but, as a result of a bureaucratic error, his birth certificate recorded his year of birth as 1899. He never corrected this, joking that people already considered him too young for his job.

As there was no high school in Loulé, the family's children studied with private teachers. His brother Humberto also taught the rest of the family and under his tutelage Pacheco was able to gain admission to Faro Lyceum as a boarding student. While at this school he worked to pay the fees. He then entered the newly created Instituto Superior Técnico (IST: Higher Technical Institute – now part of the University of Lisbon) at the age of 17, living with Humberto. He graduated in electrical engineering in 1923. Considered to be a brilliant student, a year later he was hired as an assistant at IST and in 1925 he was already a full professor, teaching the subject of general mathematics. In 1926 he became interim director of IST and, in August 1927, was unanimously appointed as Director. One of his first acts was to present proposals for a new building.

== Political career ==
Pacheco was appointed as minister of public instruction in April 1928, but resigned in November of the same year. However, in that period he carried out a mission that would prove important in the history of Portugal, visiting António de Oliveira Salazar, then a professor in the University of Coimbra, to persuade him to return to the Portuguese capital, Lisbon to become minister of finance, a position he had held in 1926 for just five days before resigning when the conditions he proposed to control rampant overspending were refused. Pacheco's mission proved successful and Salazar again became minister of finance, being appointed as prime minister in 1932 and effectively becoming the country's dictator.

In July 1932 Pacheco was asked by Salazar to become the first minister of public works and communications, a position he held until January 1936, before returning to IST for two years. In January 1938 he was appointed as president of Lisbon City Council and in May 1938 he was reinstated as minister of public works and communications. In this capacity he initiated, planned, and executed numerous works related to the provision of social housing, the development of roads, and other civil engineering, such as Lisbon Airport, improvement to ports, hydro-electric plants, hospitals, schools, the national stadium and the National Statistics Institute. He did not forget his alma mater, building a new headquarters for the IST. He was also responsible for the organization of the 1940 Portuguese World Exhibition, held in Belém, Lisbon, which included construction of the Monument of the Discoveries of Portugal. In addition, he was responsible for the reforestation of the Monsanto Forest Park, now known as the "lungs of Lisbon", with the work mainly being done by prisoners. He also instigated a considerable improvement in post and telecommunications services and the water supply and developed an urbanization plan for the entire country. Although the 25 de Abril Bridge over the Tagus river was not completed until 1966, Pacheco organized the first commission to investigate its feasibility.

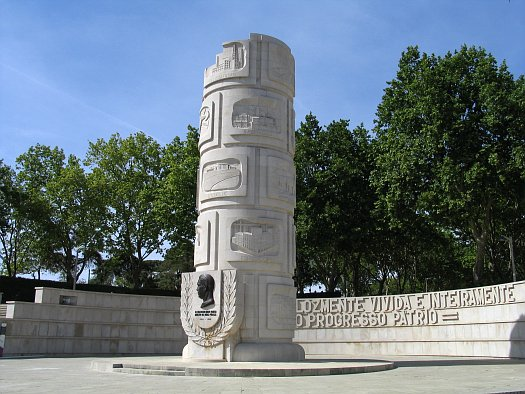
Monument to Duarte Pacheco in Loulé.

The social housing built while Pacheco was the minister is now considered by many to be an eyesore but at the time represented a major advancement in living conditions for poorer sections of the Portuguese population. The developments included those in Alvalade, Encarnação and Ajuda, all in Lisbon. Road developments supervised by Pacheco included roads between Lisbon and Vila Franca de Xira, Lisbon and the national stadium (the first motorway in Portugal), and the coast road between Lisbon and Cascais, known as the "Estrada Marginal". His ideas for motorway development stemmed from a visit in 1938 to Italy, while planning the Portuguese World Exhibition. Improvements to ports included not only Lisbon and Leixões, serving the second city of Porto, but also Viana do Castelo, Póvoa de Varzim, Aveiro, Figueira da Foz, Peniche, Setúbal, Vila Real de Santo António, Funchal in Madeira and Ponta Delgada in the Azores, This work was essential both to promote trade and fisheries and also to facilitate the development of the cement industry necessary to carry out all the other works he planned.

Pacheco was reportedly a workaholic, once telling a niece who asked him why he was not married that "I have no time". He slept little and often used journeys in his ministerial car to get some sleep. His imaginative and dynamic approach was assisted by Salazar, who gave him a free hand to cut through bureaucratic red tape. This gave him considerable powers to carry out compulsory purchases of rural land needed for urban development, making him very unpopular in some circles. He also centralised urban development: no urbanization work could be carried out that was not an integral part of the general urbanization plan. Opposition to these policies led to Salazar reluctantly sacking him in January 1936, but he was reinstated to the same ministerial post in May 1938 and from that time felt secure in his efforts to change the face of Portugal.

Pacheco not only promoted urbanization and new construction but also reconstruction and renovation. Under his direction such reconstruction included the São Bento Palace, São Jorge Castle, Lisbon Cathedral, the São Carlos National Theatre, and the Palace of the Dukes of Braganza in Guimarães. Among other innovations for which he has been credited are the Pousadas de Portugal, a chain of hotels in historic buildings, which was founded in 1942, and the establishment of the Road Transport Industry Association.

== Awards ==
In 1933, he was awarded the Grand Cross of the Military Order of Christ. In 1940, he was awarded the Grand Cross of the Military Order of Saint James of the Sword.

== Death ==
On the morning of 15 November 1943, Pacheco went to Vila Viçosa in the Alentejo region to review the work underway on a statue of King João IV. He wanted to arrive back in Lisbon in time for a Council of Ministers meeting and urged his driver to speed up. Between Montemor-o-Novo and Vendas Novas, his vehicle collided with a cork tree. He was transported to hospital in Setúbal where he died from internal bleeding. The President of Loulé municipality requested that Pacheco's remains be transferred to Loulé for burial but Salazar refused on the grounds that Pacheco had spent his life of public service in Lisbon. He was buried in the "Mausoleum of the Benefactors of the City of Lisbon", at Alto de São João Cemetery in Lisbon.

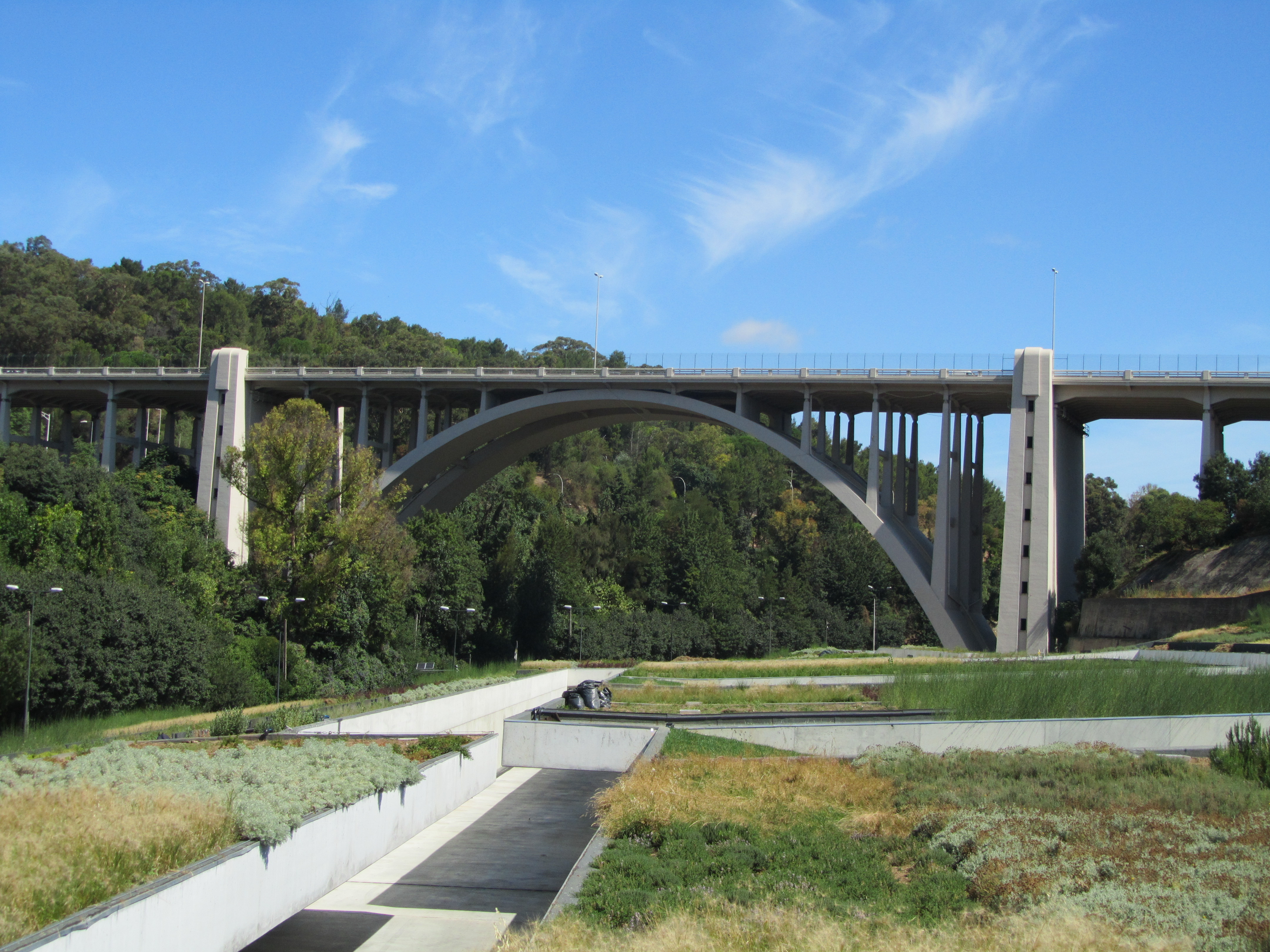
The Duarte Pacheco viaduct in Lisbon

Pacheco's name remains well known to the people of Lisbon as the viaduct that crosses the Alcântara Valley, connecting the A5 motorway to the centre of Lisbon, bears his name. There is a monument to him on the western edge of the viaduct and one in his home town of Loulé, inaugurated by Salazar on the 10th anniversary of Pacheco's death. The memorial contains 18 scenes sculpted in stone, which portray the areas of civil engineering on which Pacheco had an influence. In Loulé there is also a plaque on the house where he was born. A bridge over the Tâmega river is also named after him, as are several roads.
