= Bartolomeu Cid dos Santos =

Portuguese artist (1931–2008)

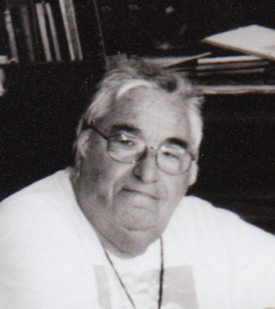
Bartolomeu Cid dos Santos

Bartolomeu Cid dos Santos (Barto) (24 August 1931 – 21 May 2008) was a Portuguese artist and professor who specialized in the plastic arts, with an emphasis on printmaking and engravings.

Bartolomeu Cid dos Santos was born in Lisbon, Portugal, in 1931. He studied at the Escola Superior de Belas Artes, a Portuguese school for fine arts, from 1950 until 1956. Santos furthered his art training at the Slade School of Fine Art in London, the United Kingdom, from 1956 until 1958. He studied under Anthony Gross while attending The Slade School of Fine Art, UCL. Santos held his first personal, public art exhibition at the National Society of Fine Arts in Lisbon in 1959. Ultimately, Santos would hold 82 separate art exhibitions during his career.

Santos began teaching fine arts at the Slade School of Fine Art following the completion of his studies. He remained as a faculty member in Slade's Department of Engraving from 1961 until his retirement from the school in 1996. He also lectured and taught at art schools and colleges throughout Great Britain as a visiting artist.

Santos also taught extensively as a visiting professor outside of Portugal and the United Kingdom. He taught at the University of Wisconsin in Madison, Wisconsin, in 1969 and again in 1980 as a visiting professor. Santos also taught at the Konstkollan Umea in Sweden in 1977 and 1978 and the National College of Arts in Lahore, Pakistan, in 1986 and 1987. He also taught at the Academia de Artes Visuais in Macau on numerous occasions.

Bartolomeu Cid dos Santos' work can be found in private and public art collections worldwide. Examples of his work can be found on public display in the Entre Campos Station in the city of Lisbon.

Bartolomeu Cid dos Santos died in London on 21 May 2008, at the age of 77. He had been ill for some time, according to his friend, Portuguese writer, Luis Amorim de Sousa.

For his last show he invited friend and colleague John Aiken to commission the exhibit in the Casa das Artes, Tavira in August 2008. The stairs leading to his printmaking studio, in Tavira, have been named after him.
