= Almada Negreiros =

Portuguese artist (1893–1970)

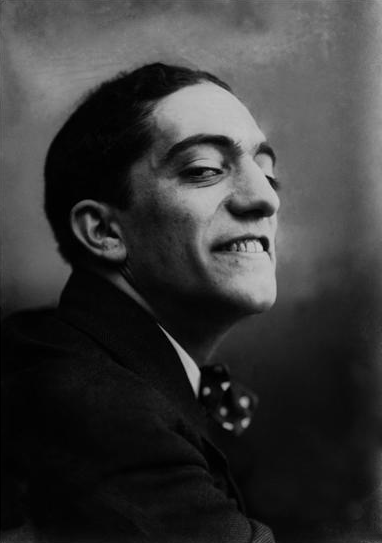
- Almada Negreiros, photographed by Vitoriano Braga
- Born: 7 April 1893; Roça Saudade, Trindade, São Tomé
- Died: 15 July 1970 (aged 77); Hospital de São Luís dos Franceses, Lisbon
- Occupations: Painter, writer
- Spouse: Sarah Afonso
- Writing career
- Genres: novel, play, poem, essays and pamphletary manifests
- Movements: Modernism, Futurism

Signature
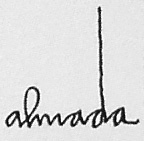

José Sobral de Almada Negreiros, usually known as Almada Negreiros (7 April 1893 – 15 June 1970), was a Portuguese artist. He was born in the colony of Portuguese São Tomé and Príncipe, the son of a Portuguese father, António Lobo de Almada Negreiros, and a Santomean mother, Elvira Freire Sobral. Besides literature and painting, Almada developed ballet choreographies, and worked on tapestry, engraving, murals, caricature, mosaic, azulejo and stained glass.

== Life and work ==
His mother died in 1896. In 1900 he entered a Jesuit boarding school in Campolide, Lisbon. After the October 1910 republican revolution the school was closed and Almada entered the Escola Internacional, also in Lisbon.

In 1913 he had his first individual exhibition, showing 90 drawings. In 1915, along with Fernando Pessoa and Mário de Sá-Carneiro, he published poems and texts in the Orpheu artistic magazine, which would introduce modernist literature and art in Portugal. This same year Almada Negreiros wrote the famous Manifesto Anti-Dantas e por extenso, a humorous attack against a more traditionalist and bourgeois older generation. In 1915 the artist also conceived the O Sonho da Rosa ballet.

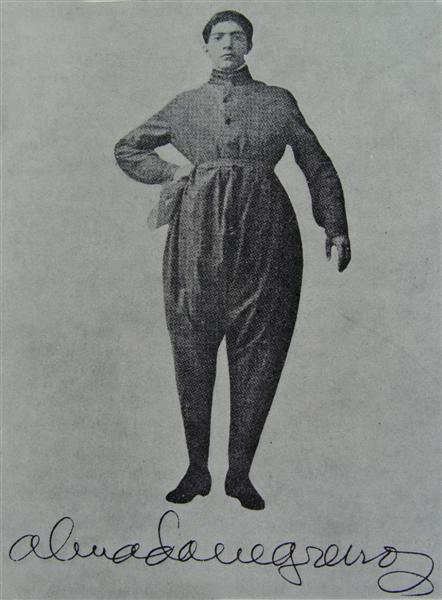
Negreiros at the 1st Futurist Conference, April 1917

In 1917, with the aim of introducing the Portuguese public to Futuristic aesthetics, Almada Negreiros published, together with Santa-Rita Pintor, the Portugal Futurista magazine, writing the Ultimatum Futurista, às gerações portuguezas do século XX ("Futurist ultimatum to the Portuguese generations of the 20th century"). He promoted a conference, the Sessão Futurista ("Futurist Session"), where he appeared wearing a flight suit.

Between the years 1918–20 Almada lived in Paris. To support himself, he worked as a dancer and as a factory worker. In 1920 he returned to Lisbon. In 1925 he produced two paintings for one of the most famous cafés in Lisbon, A Brasileira and in 1926-27 a nude for the Bristol Club, a nightclub with a modernist design. In 1927 he went to Madrid where he wrote for several Spanish publications, including Cronica and La Farsa. Around this same time he wrote El Uno, tragédia de la Unidad.

Back in Portugal, in the following years his artistic productions were wide and prolific as he became a key artist in Portuguese modern art, influenced by Cubism and, mainly, by Futurism. His role during António de Oliveira Salazar's authoritarian regime was however ambiguous, acting both as an "aligned" artist (doing public mural paintings or propaganda posters) and a provocative critic of Portuguese society of the time.

In 1934 he married painter Sarah Afonso (13 May 1899 – 14 December 1983). Re-settled for good in Portugal, he would continue in his role as "artistic agitator" within the oppressed society that was Portugal until the time of his death. In 1934 the couple had their only son, José Afonso de Almada Negreiros.

He was also, if only occasionally, an actor and a dancer, understanding that all forms of art are intimately linked.

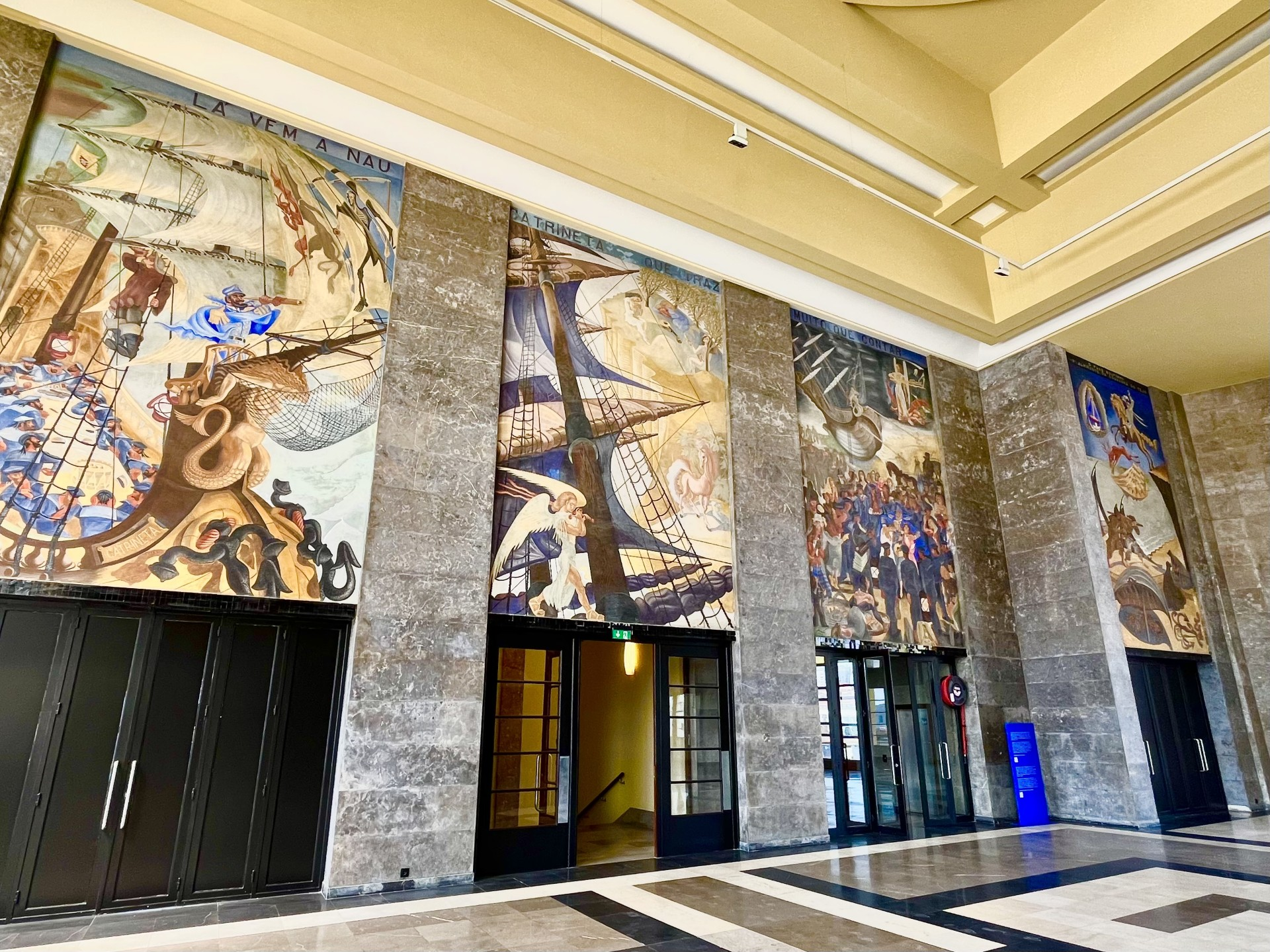
The upper floor of the Alcântara terminal with murals by Negreiros

== Painting and visual arts ==
Almada Negreiros always called himself a futurist artist, inspired by Filippo Tommaso Marinetti and other modern artists; however his style is wider, and does not fit easily into a category. Adding to this modern approach his works also revealed a decorative and arabesque richness, and sometimes a geometrical abstraction. His public art was often politically engaged, as his murals at the Gare Maritima de Alcantara and neighbouring Gare Maritima Rocha Conde de Óbidos show. Many of his paintings and drawings show common people in daily affairs or attitudes usual in socialist art. His work as a visual artist extended to tapestry, printmaking, theater and ballet scenography.

== Novels and writings ==
An important part of his artistic production was literary. Almada Negreiros wrote novels, poems, playwrights, essays and manifests that were, in his lifetime, published in books, magazines, newspapers or even low-cost booklets and flyers.

In his novels and playwrights the daily affairs of people appear between a sense of the absurd and non-sense that can be related to earlier writers like Eugène Ionesco or Arthur Adamov. His literary work is highly evolved with his artistic view, often visual and "geometric" in his descriptions and backgrounds.

His manifestos were highly provocative, like "Manifesto Anti-Dantas", a humorous and aggressive text against Júlio Dantas, a major figure of arts and culture of Salazar's regime, which stands as a banner against mediocrity and conformism. He also wrote essays on the theory of colours, the Portuguese antique painting, geometry and gave numerous conferences on cultural matters.

== Literary works ==
- O Moinho (1913)
- Os Outros (1914)
- 23, 2º Andar (1914)
- Frizos, published in Orpheu vol. 1, pp. 51–59 (prose) (1915)
- A Cena do Ódio (poetry) (1915)
- Manifesto Anti-Dantas e por extenso (1915)
- Litoral (1915)
- A Engomadeira (novel) (1915, published in 1917)
- Ultimatum Futurista, às gerações portuguezas do século XX (conference) (1917)
- K4, O Quadrado Azul (novel) (1917)
- Saltimbancos Contrastes Simultâneos (1917)
- A Invenção do Corpo (conference) (1921)
- O Cágado (1921)
- A Invenção do Dia Claro (1921)
- Histoire du Portugal par coeur (1922)
- Pierrot e Arlequim (theatre) (1924)
- Nome de Guerra (novel) (1925, published in 1938)
- A Questão dos Painéis (essay) (1926)
- El uno, tragedia de la unidad (composed of Deseja-se Mulher and S.O.S) (1928)
- Portugal, Direcção Única (1932)
- Elogio da Ingenuidade ou as Desventuras da Esperteza Saloia (1936)
- Mito-Alegoría-Símbolo, Monólogo autodidacta na oficina da pintura (1948)
