= Portuguese World Exhibition =

1940 exposition in Lisbon, Portugal

- Flag of the Portuguese World Exhibition

Overview
- BIE-class: Unrecognized exposition
- Name: Portuguese World Exhibition
- Building(s): Museu de Arte Popular
- Visitors: 3 million
- Organized by: Augusto de Castro, Júlio Dantas, Cottinelli Telmo, António Ferro

Participant(s)
- Countries: 2

Location
- Country: Portugal
- City: Lisbon
- Venue: Praça do Império, Belém
- Coordinates: 38°41′47″N 9°12′27″W

Timeline
- Opening: 23 June 1940
- Closure: 2 December 1940

The Portuguese World Exhibition (Portuguese: Exposição do Mundo Português) was held in Lisbon in 1940 to mark 800 years since the foundation of the country and 300 years since the restoration of independence from Spain.

The fair ran from 23 June to 2 December 1940, held on the Praça do Império, and was attended by 3 million people.

== Organizers ==
Augusto de Castro was the commissioner general, Júlio Dantas president of committee, Cottinelli Telmo the master architect, António Ferro (director), and lead engineer Duarte Pacheco.

The exhibition was opened by President Carmona, with Oliveira Salazar also in attendance.

== Contents ==
The fair was divided into three main sections of display: history, ethnography, and the colonial world.

=== Monument to Discoveries ===
A Monument of the Discoveries of Portugal Padrão dos Descobrimentos was designed by Leopoldo de Almeida and Cottinelli Telmo. It was dismantled in 1958 and rebuilt in 1960 to honor the 500th anniversary of the death of Prince Henry the Navigator.

=== Nautical sports ===
A modernist restaurant and beer hall was designed by António Lino with guidance from Cottinelli Telmo. In 2014, it was remodelled to become a nightclub and bar.

=== Popular life ===
The pavilion of popular life was designed by Veloso Reis and João Simões and after the exhibition was refurbished and opened as Lisbon's Museum of Popular Art in 1948.

=== Brazil ===
The Brazil pavilion, named Independent Brazilian Pavilion, was designed by Raul Lino, with interiors by Roberto Lacombe. Its contents included a large photographic mural and a reading room with 5000 works. It had an art section including paintings by Lucílio de Albuquerque, Arthur Timótheo da Costa, Oscar Pereira da Silva and Candido Portinari.

=== Nau Portugal ===
Nau Portugal was a galleon replica, built by the Mónicas's Family Shipyard, it was exhibited near the Maritime Discoveries Pavilion. It suffered irreparable damage in the cyclone of 1941. After that, it was dismantled and transformed into a barge.

== See also ==
- Portuguese colonial exhibition
- Exhibition of the centenary of the opening of the Ports of Brazil
