= All I Want (art exhibition) =

Exhibition of Portuguese women's art

All I Want (Tudo O Que Eu Quero) was an exhibition of art produced by 40 Portuguese women from the beginning of the 20th century to 2020. It was shown in Lisbon, Portugal in 2021 and in Tours, France in 2022 as part of the cultural programme of the 2021 Portuguese Presidency of the Council of the European Union, in association with the Portuguese Ministry of Culture.

== Description ==
Two hundred works by 40 Portuguese women were exhibited. The exhibition included renowned Portuguese artists, such as Paula Rego, Ana Vasconcelos and Maria Helena Vieira da Silva, the first woman to receive the French Grand Prix National des Arts, in 1966, as well as many lesser-known artists. All were born before 1980. The poster for the exhibition featured Self-Portrait in a Red Coat by Aurélia de Sousa painted in 1900 and a work called A Casa, by Helena Almeida from 1979. The exhibition was multi-disciplinary, with painting and sculpture as well as video, performance and sound. The title was inspired by the reflections of the Russian psychoanalyst Lou Andreas-Salomé on the place of women in society and the works displayed were designed to emphasise the long collective effort for the right of women to have a full artistic existence.

The exhibition was first shown at the Calouste Gulbenkian Museum in Lisbon, Portugal between 2 June and 23 August 2021. The curators of the exhibition were Helena de Freitas and Bruno Marchand. In 2022 it was presented at the Centre de Création Contemporaine Olivier Debré (CCCOD) in Tours, France.

== Artists ==
The works shown were by the following artists:

- Aurélia de Sousa
- Mily Possoz
- Rosa Ramalho
- Maria Lamas
- Sarah Affonso
- Ofélia Marques
- Maria Helena Vieira da Silva
- Maria Keil
- Salette Tavares
- Menez
- Ana Hatherly
- Lourdes Castro
- Helena Almeida
- Paula Rego
- Maria Antónia Siza
- Ana Vieira
- Maria José Oliveira
- Clara Menéres
- Graça Morais
- Maria José Aguiar
- Luisa Cunha
- Rosa Carvalho
- Ana Léon
- Ângela Ferreira
- Joana Rosa
- Ana Vidigal
- Armanda Duarte
- Fernanda Fragateiro
- Patrícia Garrido
- Gabriela Albergaria
- Susanne Themlitz
- Grada Kilomba
- Maria Capelo
- Patrícia Almeida
- Joana Vasconcelos
- Carla Filipe
- Filipa César
- Inês Botelho
- Isabel Carvalho
- Sónia Almeida
