= Ana Léon =

Portuguese artist (born 1957)

- Born: 1957 (age 68–69); Lisbon, Portugal
- Education: University of Lisbon; Paris 1 Panthéon-Sorbonne University
- Known for: Film animation

Ana Léon (born 1957) is a Portuguese artist who lives in Paris, France. She has worked in various media, notably painting, drawing and film animation.

== Early life and education ==
Léon was born in 1957 in the Portuguese capital of Lisbon. She studied painting at the Lisbon School of Fine Arts and then obtained a master's degree in aesthetics at the Paris 1 Panthéon-Sorbonne University. She received a scholarship from the French Government for the period between 1982 and 1984 and a further scholarship from the Calouste Gulbenkian Foundation in Paris between 1986 and 1987.

== Artistic career ==
After an initial period in which she concentrated on installations and drawing, Léon developed, from the 1990s, a relationship with video that was transcribed to digital format from Super 8 film analogue originals, creating very short films using stop-motion techniques that involve taking one frame at a time. She used small moulded figures that performed small theatrical pieces where the scenes were both everyday and absurd. Later, she began to use Action Man puppets, a choice determined by their inexpressiveness and physical mobility.. She has said that among her references were the American video artist, Bill Viola, and the American sculptor and performance artist, Bruce Nauman.

Léon has exhibited since 1982, when she was part of an exhibition called Azulvermelho (BlueRed) together with Pedro Calapez, held in Lisbon. Among her solo exhibitions have been an installation, Ménagerie de Verre, in Paris in 1992; Drawings, at the Centro de Arte Moderna Gulbenkian (CAM) in Lisbon in 1993; and Metamorphoses at the National Museum of Natural History and Science, Lisbon in 1994. In 4 Fables, a 1997 film, Léon recreated four fables by Jean de La Fontaine: The Cicada and the Ant,The Frog Who Wanted to Be the Size of an Ox,The Hare and the Tortoise, and The Crow and the Fox. Departing from the original scripts and distorting the moral aspects of the fables, she appropriated the characters, with the personified animals devouring each other in a cannibalistic orgy. In Drawings and Films, at the Gulbenkian Cultural Centre in Paris in 2003, her drawings shared the same formal motifs and themes with the animated films that were also presented. 7 films was presented at the Cinema Museum in Lisbon during 2005 and the film Strip-Tease at the Théâtre du Rond Point in Paris, in 2007. Bodies was presented at the Círculo de Artes Plásticas de Coimbra in 2021. In 2023 the Serralves museum in Porto organised a roving exhibition of her drawings in the museum's collection, together with those of Ricard Jacinto. Gestos, also using models around 25cm tall to create videos, was exhibited at the Museum of Art, Architecture and Technology in Lisbon in 2025.

Léon has been part of group exhibitions in Bilbao, Spain, Montrouge, Roubaix and Toulon in France and Moscow in Russia, as well as in Lisbon and elsewhere. In 2021, she was one of 40 women artists chosen by the Calouste Gulbenkian Museum for an exhibition in Lisbon of 20th-century and early 21st-century Portuguese women's art, called All I Want (Tudo O Que Eu Quero). In 2023 her work was included in the exhibition at CAM called Histórias de uma Coleção, celebrating the 40 years of the museum's existence.
