= Mónica de Miranda =

Portuguese visual artist and researcher (born 1976)

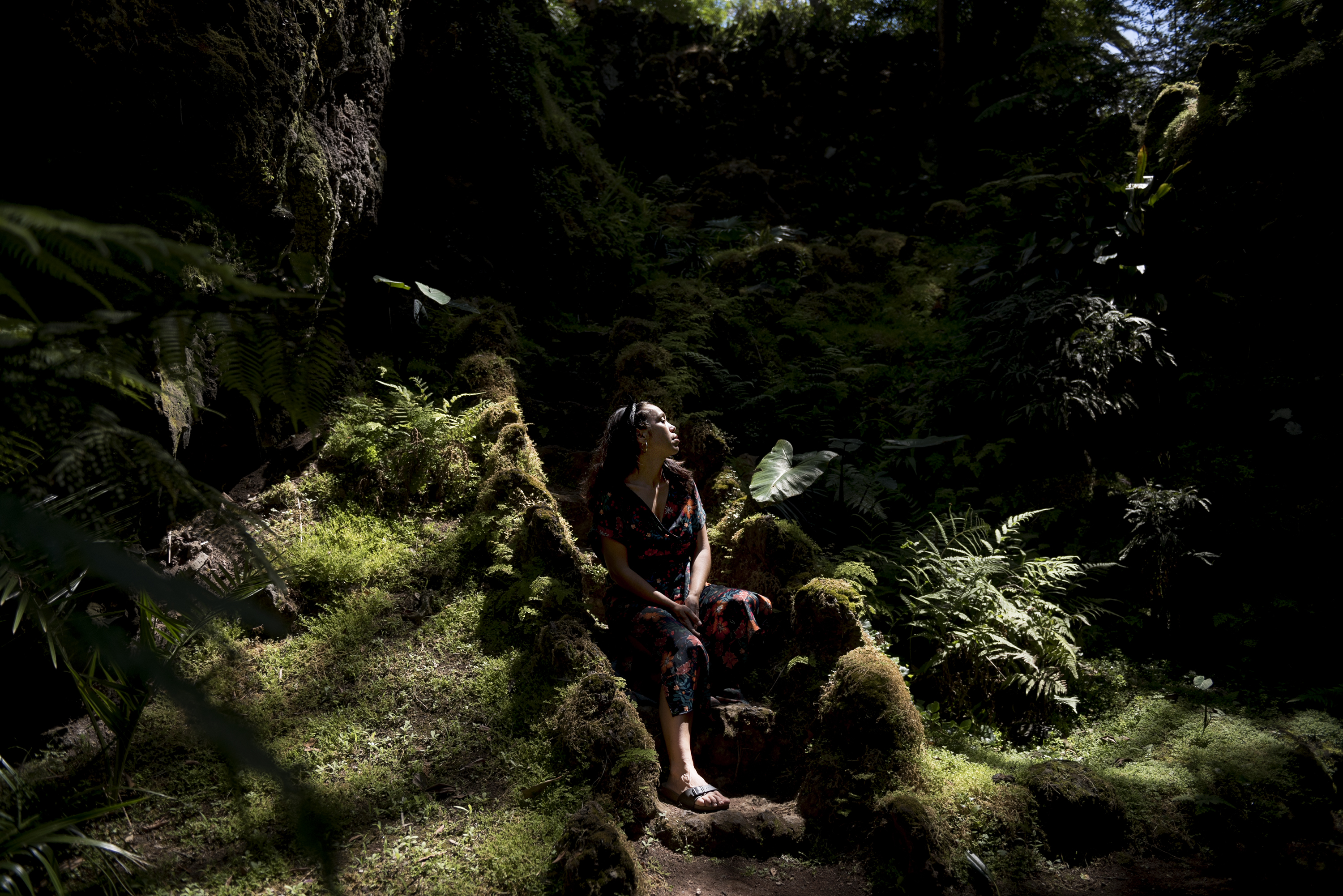
Mónica de Miranda

Mónica de Miranda (born Porto, 1976) is a Portuguese visual artist, photographer, filmmaker, and researcher of Angolan ancestry known for her artwork on socially inspired themes, including postcolonial issues of geography, history, and subjectivity related to Africa and its diaspora. Her media include photography, mixed media and video. De Miranda first became known for her photographic records of the ruins of modern hotels in post-war Angola, and their surrounding sociopolitical circumstances. Her photographic series, videos, short films, and installations have been internationally exhibited at art biennales, galleries, and museums, some of which keep her work in their permanent art collections. Her work has been reviewed in specialized art sources.

De Miranda was born in Porto and is based in Lisbon since 2009.

== Education ==
De Miranda graduated as a Bachelor of Visual Arts from the Camberwell College of Arts, London, in 1998. She completed an MSc in Art and Education at the Institute of Education (London) in 2000, and obtained a PhD degree in Visual Arts and Multimedia at the University of Middlesex in 2014 (Thesis: Geography of Affections: Tales of Identity, Diaspora and Travel in contemporary arts). She pursued postdoctoral studies at the University of Lisbon between 2015 and 2018.

== Career ==
De Miranda is affiliated with the University of Lisbon, Centro de Estudos Comparatistas, Faculdade de Letras, where she leads research projects dealing with sociocultural and political aspects of contemporary migration movements linked to lusophone Africa. Among such projects are Post-Archive: Politics of Memory, Place and Identity, and Visual Culture, Migration, Globalization and Decolonization.

During her multiyear stay in London prior to 2009, she collaborated with researchers at Goldsmiths College and the Institute of International Visual Arts. Working in Tate Britain-related projects, she was engaged with underprivileged adolescents in schools and community centres in the boroughs of Peckham and Brixton.

In Lisbon, she is a co-founder of Xerem, a cultural association that runs a program of international residencies and workshops for artists and is part of the Triangle Network. She is a Director and artistic coordinator at the Hangar Center of Artistic Research, founded in 2014 in Graça (Lisbon). Her work has been supported by entities such as La Caixa Foundation. Further details of De Miranda's career can be found online.

== Works ==
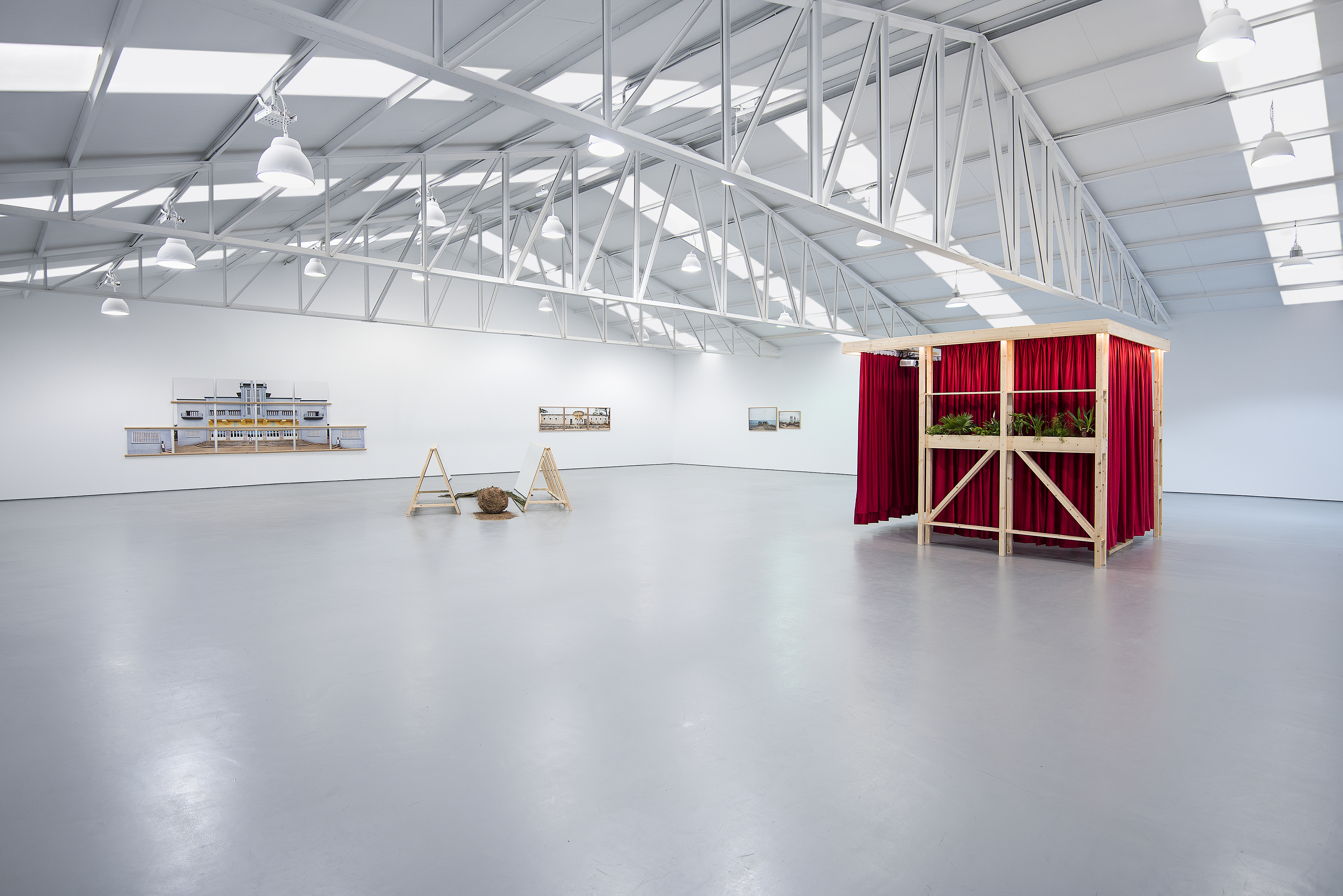
Mónica de Miranda's exhibition at Sabrina Amrani gallery, 2020

De Miranda's work is research-based and looks at the convergence of politics, gender, memory and space. Her works typically consist of video, photography and installation, which frequently register the artist's view on urban and peri-urban, Luso-African landscape and associated contemporary and colonial history.

Her works have been shown at art biennales (Venice 2014, Dakar 2016, Lumbumbashi 2019, Berlin 2022, Bamako BIENALSUR, Houston Fotofest, Venice 2024, Sharjah 2025, among others); also at galleries, and museums including the Berardo Collection Museum (Lisbon 2016), the Pera Museum (Istanbul 2017) the National Museum of Contemporary Art Chiado, (MNAC, Lisbon 2014), the Museum of Art, Architecture and Technology (Lisbon 2019), and the Calouste Gulbenkian Museum (Lisbon 2020). The latter three museums, as well as the Lisbon Municipal Archive, the PLMJ Foundation, and the Centro Cultural de Lagos keep De Miranda's pieces in their permanent art collections.

Her art is represented in the collections of 21c Museum Hotels, Louisville, Kentucky, USA; Soho House, London, UK; Colección Alma Colectiva, Guadalajara, Mexico; Nesr Foundation, Luanda, Angola, and PLMJ, Lisbon, Portugal.

In 2024, Mónica de Miranda represented Portugal at the 60th International Venice Biennale. The selected project titled Greenhouse "challenged monolithic notions of identity, culture, nation and belonging", by creating a "Creole Garden" that staged sculptures, performances, workshops and more.

Her short films have competed on several film festivals, including: Doclisboa 2022 (with “The Island” - 2022), and the Avanca Film Festival 2023 (with "Red Horizon" - 2020).

She won the Idealista Contemporary Art Prize with the project South Circular. Her pieces were nominated for the Novo Banco Photo Award (2016), and the New Artist Award of the EDP Foundation in 2019. Her exhibition Geografia Dormente was nominated for the Best Photographic Work of the Authors Prize – 2019 by the Sociedade Portuguesa de Autores. Her project As if the World Had no East won the first edition of EXPOSED Grant for Contemporary Photography in 2023. Substantial critique of De Miranda's artwork can be found online, where she has been regarded as "an artist whose work crosses borders and outlines a landscape of plural identities, inspired by her own experience of an increasingly itinerant culture". Her images are "lyrical, performative, and contemplated quiet moments that offer a kind of ...very reflective and melancholic", as written by Marigold Warner, Associate Online Editor at the British Journal of Photography when reviewing De Miranda's artwork.

In 2023, Mónica de Miranda was awarded with the Soros Arts scholarship granted by The Open Society Foundation to produce a collaborative film, archive and programming series "interrogating the harmful impacts of gentrification, urban racism, and housing crises in Lisbon, Portugal."

Her best known pieces include The Island, Path to the Stars, Panorama, Hotel Globo, Tales of Lisbon, and South Circular. Her work has been reviewed in specialized art sources such as New York Magazine, L'Œil de la photographie, British Journal of Photography, and Aesthetica Magazine.

De Miranda's oeuvre has been the subject of study of a number of academic works, examining aspects such as her sarcastic photography, the deep sociopolitical meanings behind her films, the aesthetics of fragmenting, moving and doubling in her photographic installations, and her influence on contemporary Portuguese video art.

== Exhibitions ==
- Nov 2004 - The Search For Identity, group show, Doncaster Museum & Art Gallery, Doncaster, UK
- Feb 2005 In the Bag!, group show, Brixton Art Gallery, Brixton, London
- Apr 2013 – Private Lives, group show, Cascais Cultural Center, Cascais, Portugal
- Jun 2014 – Ilha de São Jorge, 6-film exhibition shown at the 14th Venice Biennale of Architecture, Venice. Italy
- Oct 2015 - Telling Time, group show, Rencontres africaines de la photographie 10th edition, Bamako, Mali
- Jul 2015 – Hotel Globo, Museu Nacional de Arte Contemporânea do Chiado, Lisbon
- Sep 2015 O Reverso da Convivência, group show, Museu Nacional de Arte Contemporânea do Chiado, Lisbon
- May 2016 – 12th Dakar Biennale, Dak'Art – Biennale de l'Art Africain Contemporain, Dakar, Senegal
- Oct 2016 - Bienal de Fotografia Vila Franca de Xira, group show, Galeria Paulo Nunes, Lisbon
- Dec 2016 – Addis Foto Fest, Addis Ababa, Ethiopia
- Mar 2017 – Lejour qui vient, Galerie des Galeries, Paris, France
- Jun 2017 – Atlantic – A Journey to the center of the earth. solo show, Galeria Sabrina Amrani, Madrid, Spain
- Oct 2017 – Mostra Fora de Cena, Luanda, Angola
- Nov 2017 – AKAA, Also Known As Africa Art Fair, group show, Carreau du Temple, Paris, France
- Jan 2018 – Transfer, solo show and residence, Académie des Beaux Arts de Kinshasa, República Democrática do Congo
- Jul 2018 Mónica de Miranda em Moçambique
- Ago 2018 – Daqui Pra Frente – Arte Contemporânea em Angola, Caixa Cultural Brasília, Brasil
- Sep 2018 – Tomorrow is another day, solo show, Carlos Carvalho – Arte Contemporánea
- Nov 2018 – Geografia Dormente, solo show, Galeria Municipal de Arte de Almada, Portugal
- Nov 2018 – Panorama, solo show, Galería do Banco Económico, Luanda, Angola.
- Mar 2019 – Fiction and Fabrication, group show, Museum of Art Architecture and Technology, Lisbon
- Oct 2019 – Bienal Sur, group show, Guayaquil, Ecuador
- Nov 2019, Taxidermy of the Future, two artist show, VI Bienal de Lubumbashi, Congo
- Dec 2019 - Taxidermy of the future, group show, National Museum of Natural History, Luanda, Angola
- Feb 2020 Twins (from series Cinema Karl Marx) – group show Partidas e Chegadas – Artistas em Viagem, Calouste Gulbenkian Museum, Lisbon
- Mar 2020 – African Cosmologies, group show, Fotofest Biennial. Houston, USA.
- Apr 2020 - South Circular (online), Galería Sabrina Amrani
- May 2020 – Contos de Lisboa, solo show, Arquivo Municipal de Lisboa, Lisbon
- Dec 2020 – Deconstruction/Reconstruction, Sabrina Amrani Gallery, Madrid
- Jan 2021 - All That Burns Melts Into The Air, Sabrina Amrani, Madrid, Spain
- Jan 2022 - The Island, Autograph Gallery, London, UK
- Mar 2022 - Shadows Fall Behind, Sabrina Amrani, Madrid, Spain
- Apr 2022 - No longer with the Memory but with its Future, Oratorio San Ludovico-Nuova Icona, Venice Biennale, Venice, Italy
- Jun 2022 - 12.ª Bienal de Arte Contemporânea, Berlin
- Jul 2022 - Mirages and Deep Time, Galeria Municipal Avenida da India, Lisbon, Portugal
- Oct 2022 - Future Archives, RAMPA, Porto, Portugal
- Oct 2022 - Construir o Tempo (Constructing time), Camões Centrol Cultural Português, Luanda, Angola
- Nov 2022 - Caminho para as Estrelas, Jahmek Contemporary Art, Luanda, Angola
- Jan 2023 - Path to the Stars, SALA 10, Museo Universitario Arte Contemporáneo, Mexico City, Mexico
- Feb 2023 - The Island, Turku Art Museum, Turku, Finland
- Apr 2023 - O Sol Não Nasce A Norte, A Caixa, Portugal
- Apr 2024 - La Biennale di Venezia, Venice, Italy
- Sep 2024 - Free as they want to be: Artists Committed to Memory, Atlanta, USA
- Sep 2024 - Mónica de Miranda: Path to the Stars, Austin, USA
- Feb 2025 - Sharjah Biennial 16: to carry, Sharjah, United Arab Emirates

The above list does not necessarily include all of De Miranda's exhibitions.

== Publications ==
De Miranda's publications include the following books and book chapters:

- De Miranda, Monica (2005), Changing geographies: art without borders : participation, collaboration and interaction in socially engaged arts (Thesis).
- De Miranda, M. & Tavares E., (2017),Geography of affections, 2012–2016, Ed. Tyburn Gallery, ISBN 978-989-99810-0-3
- De Miranda, Mónica, Hotel Globo, chapter 13 in (Re)imagining African independence : film, visual arts and the fall of the Portuguese empire. Piçarra, Maria do Carmo, 1970-, Castro, Teresa, 1952-. Oxford, 2017 ISBN 978-1-78707-318-0
- De Miranda, Mónica, (2018), Atlantica : contemporary art from Angola and its diaspora. (1st edition ed., 2019). Lisbon, ISBN 978-989-20-8810-5
