= Joana Rosa (artist) =

Portuguese artist (born 1959)

- Born: 1959 (age 66–67); Lisbon, Portugal
- Occupation: Artist
- Known for: Painting

Joana Rosa (born 1959) is a Portuguese artist. Coming from a distinguished artistic family she has exhibited extensively in Portugal, Spain and in New York.

== Early life and education ==
Rosa was born in the Portuguese capital, Lisbon, in 1959. She is the daughter of the artist Helena Almeida and the granddaughter of the sculptor Leopoldo de Almeida, best known for the sculptures on the Monument of the Discoveries in Belém, Portugal. She grew up watching them at work. In 1978 she attended Saint Martin's School of Art in London, and between 1979 and 1983 she studied sculpture at the Slade School of Fine Art of University College London. Her first solo exhibition was in Lisbon in 1980 and this was followed by an exhibition of her jewellery in 1984. She received a work grant in 1986 from the Calouste Gulbenkian Foundation and the State Secretariat for Culture (SEC).

== Career ==
Rosa has taught jewellery at Ar.Co (Centre of Art and Visual Communication) in Lisbon and drawing at the IADE Faculty of Design, Technology and Communication, also in Lisbon. She has also taught drawing as part of the architecture course of the Lusíada University in Lisbon.

== Painting ==
Rosa's works have exhibited two different artistic personalities. On the one hand have been those based on doodles and scribbles, i.e. work done at random when the artist was distracted by other matters. These she called "blacks", which were drawn with graphite on translucent paper. For example, a solo exhibition in 1992 held at the Gulbenkian Modern Art Museum (CAM) in Lisbon consisted of seven drawings of airplanes, each measuring 330 × 400 cm, that were made from crumpled, pleated and stapled tracing paper, with graphite drawings. Her more recent paintings, dating from around 2012, have, on the other hand, vivid colours with images that are often considered to be "childish".

Her work is found in the collections of the New York Museum of Modern Art (MoMA), the Serralves Museum of Contemporary Art in Porto, the Calouste Gulbenkian Foundation museums and in many private collections. In 2022 both she and her mother were part of an exhibition at the Calouste Gulbenkian Museum devoted solely to Portuguese women artists, entitled Tudo O Que Eu Quero (All I Want). In addition to many exhibitions in Portugal, Rosa has exhibited frequently in Madrid and in New York.

== Personal life ==
Rosa has two daughters who both grew up surrounded by art and became keen artists.
