= Ana Vidigal =

Portuguese artist

- Born: 6 August 1960; Lisbon, Portugal
- Known for: Painting, drawing, collage
- Movement: Contemporary

Ana Vidigal (born 1960) is a Portuguese artist whose work mainly involves the use of collages.

== Early life and education ==
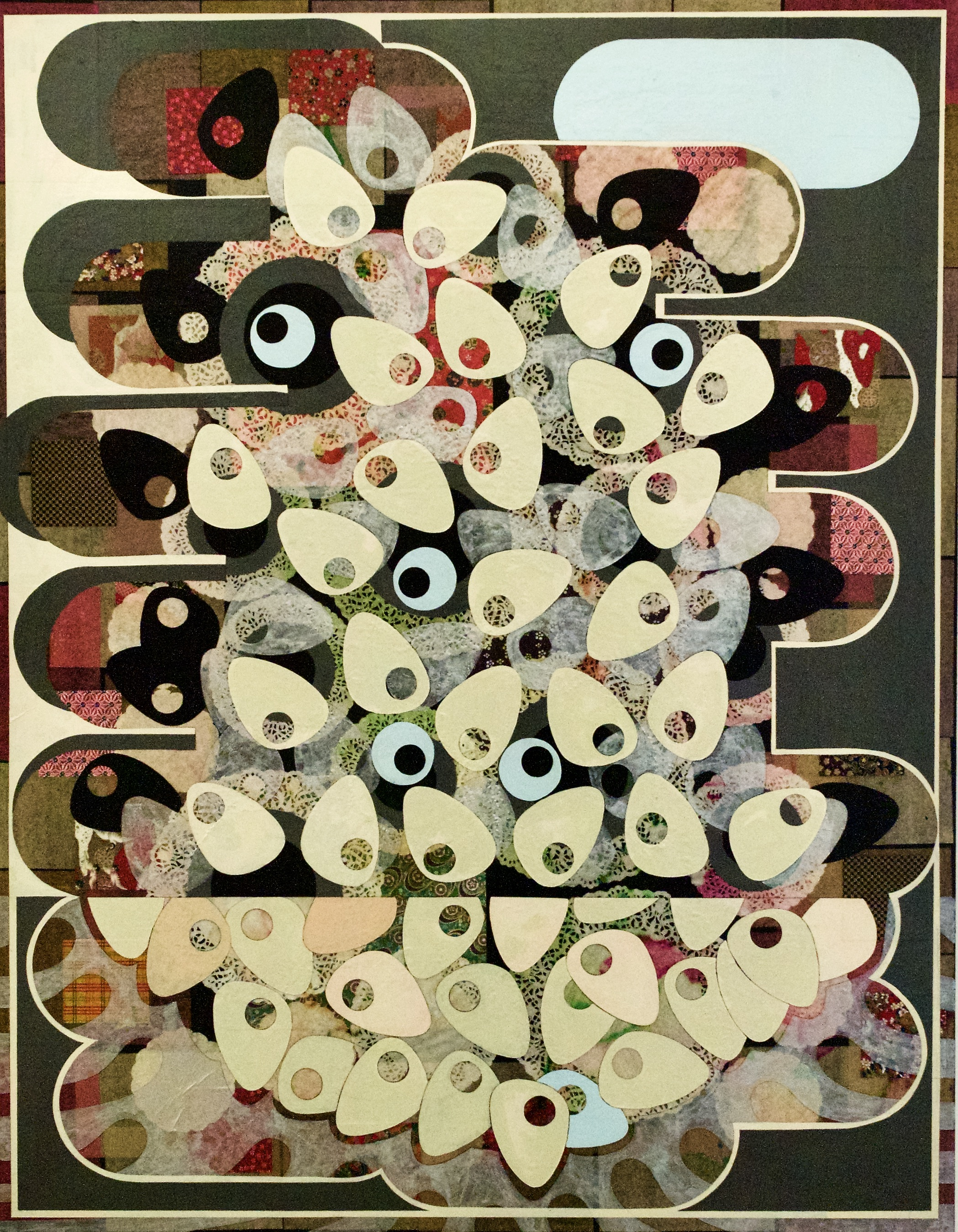
Work by Vidigal entitled Calafrio (A Shiver)

Ana Vidigal was born in the Portuguese capital of Lisbon on 6 August 1960, into a conservative family. Her father was an architect, who served overseas in the Portuguese army for two years during the country's colonial era. After attending a Roman Catholic school, she studied painting at the Faculty of Fine Arts of the University of Lisbon and graduated in 1984. From 1985 to 1987 she held a scholarship from the Calouste Gulbenkian Foundation. In 1989 she studied metal engraving with Bartolomeu Cid dos Santos at the Casa das Artes de Tavira in the Algarve region of Portugal.

While still a student, Vidigal formed a group with fellow students, named "Emerging Talents". Together with older colleagues, such as Pedro Cabrita Reis, José Pedro Croft and Pedro Calapez, they exhibited in 1984, contributing to the revaluation of painting in Portugal during the 1980s.

== Career ==
In 1995 and 2002 she was invited by the Lisbon Metro to create tile panels for the Alvalade and Alfornelos stations, respectively. In 1997, at the invitation of the Portuguese Institute of Architectural Heritage, she created a porcelain cup as part of the project "An Artist, a Monument". In 1998–1999, Vidigal was resident painter at the Museum of Contemporary Art, situated in the Fort of São Tiago in Funchal, capital of Madeira. The following year, she was selected by the International Association of Art Critics (AICA) to be one of eleven artists producing a collection of paintings dealing with the theme of the letter of Pero Vaz de Caminha, which was a letter of 1500 sent to King Manuel I of Portugal, describing the newly discovered Brazil.

She represented Portugal at the Sharjah Biennial in 2009. She held her first retrospective exhibition at the Centro de Arte Moderna Gulbenkian in Lisbon in 2010, entitled Menina Limpa, Menina Suja (Clean girl, dirty girl). In 2013, she was artist in residence at the Ifitry Centre d'Art Contemporain in Morocco. Recent solo exhibitions have been at Caldas da Rainha in 2019 and Óbidos in 2018. In October 2018, at the invitation of the Embassy of Portugal in Colombia, she held two master classes in the capital Bogotá.

== Style ==
Ana Vidigal's work uses painting, collage, assemblage and installation in a process of decontextualization and reconfiguration or recycling of images taken from different sources, exploring social and political values and even the memories conveyed by the images. Such images often relate to her childhood and the 1960s and almost always refer to the social condition of women. Her collages can be on canvas or three-dimensional.

== Collections ==
Vidigal's work is held by numerous public collections, including those of the Bank of Portugal; the Calouste Gulbenkian Foundation; the Berardo Collection Museum; the Museum of Art, Architecture and Technology and the National Museum of Contemporary Art, all in Lisbon; the Contemporary Art Museum (MACE) of Elvas and the Contemporary Art Museum (MUDAS) of Madeira.

== Awards and honours ==
Vidigal has won several awards for her work, the most notable being the Maluda prize in 1999 and the Amadeo de Souza Cardoso prize in 2003.
