= Patrícia Almeida =

Portuguese photographer (1970–2017)

- Born: 1970; Lisbon, Portugal
- Died: 21 November 2017; Lisbon
- Education: NOVA University Lisbon
- Known for: Documentary photography

Patrícia Almeida (1970–2017) was a Portuguese photographer, visual artist, and publisher. Her work was focused primarily on documentary photography, but she was also the co-founder of the publishing house GHOST. From 2003, she was part of the artistic collective Piece of Cake (POC). She was a recipient of the European Photo Exhibition Award and was nominated twice for the BES Photo Award.

== Early life and education ==
Born in Lisbon in 1970, Almeida graduated in history from the NOVA University Lisbon and studied image and communication at Goldsmiths College, part of the University of London. She later became a professor at the Escola Superior de Artes e Design (ESAD), at Caldas da Rainha.

== Career ==
Almeida's work focused mainly on documentary photography, with particular attention to urban life. In 2001 she travelled to Tokyo, which led to the book No Parking in 2004. This was published by POC Editions, a publishing house belonging to the Piece of Cake collective of European and North American photographers and visual artists, of which she was a member and presented at several of its exhibitions. In 2011 she co-founded the publishing house GHOST with her partner, David-Alexandre Guéniot. With GHOST, she participated in several international fairs, such as OffPrint in London and Paris, and Pa/per View in Brussels.

Almeida's work can be found in the collections of the Serralves Foundation, the Novo Banco Collection, the EDP Foundation, the PLMJ Law Firm collection, the Coimbra Visual Arts Centre, the Portuguese Centre of Photography, the State Contemporary Art Collection of Portugal, and the Porto Municipal Art Collection. Her work was part of the Horizons exhibition for the Calouste Gulbenkian Foundation in Paris (2009), and of Impressions and Comments at the Fundació Foto Colectania in Barcelona (2010). In 2021, after her death, she was one of 40 women artists chosen by the Gulbenkian for an exhibition in Lisbon of 20th-century and early 21st-century Portuguese women's art, called All I Want (Tudo O Que Eu Quero).

== Published work ==
Almeida's work often looked at the relationship between people and urban space. No Parking led to her becoming one of the recipients of the European Photo Exhibition Award 02 in the following year. Her first solo exhibition, *Locations*, was held in Lisbon in 2007. Portobello (2009), a project that included an exhibition at the Zé dos Bois gallery in Lisbon, and also a book with photographs taken in the Algarve, was nominated for the BES Photo contemporary art prize (now Novobanco Photo). In 2010 she was one of the three finalists for the BES Photo prize, with the project All Beauty Must Die, which has been presented at the Serralves in Porto and at music festivals. Her publication, Ma vie va changer (2015), written in collaboration with Guéniot, consisted of a record of family images, portraying a family's confrontation with national and international political, social, and economic events that occurred between 2011 and 2013 through a play of relationships between family photographs and press clippings, posters and street slogans. Today I Am Just a Butterfly (2016) was an experimental visual essay based on photographic images of the intervention of activist Josephine Witt when she interrupted the press conference of Mario Draghi, the president of the European Central Bank, on 15 April 2015.

== Death ==
Almeida died of cancer on 21 November 2017 in Lisbon. A retrospective exhibition of her photographs, entitled Transmissão (Transmission), was held in Guimarães in 2020. A retrospective of her work, compiled by Guéniot, was published in 2025.
