= Luísa Cunha =

Portuguese artist (1949–2026)

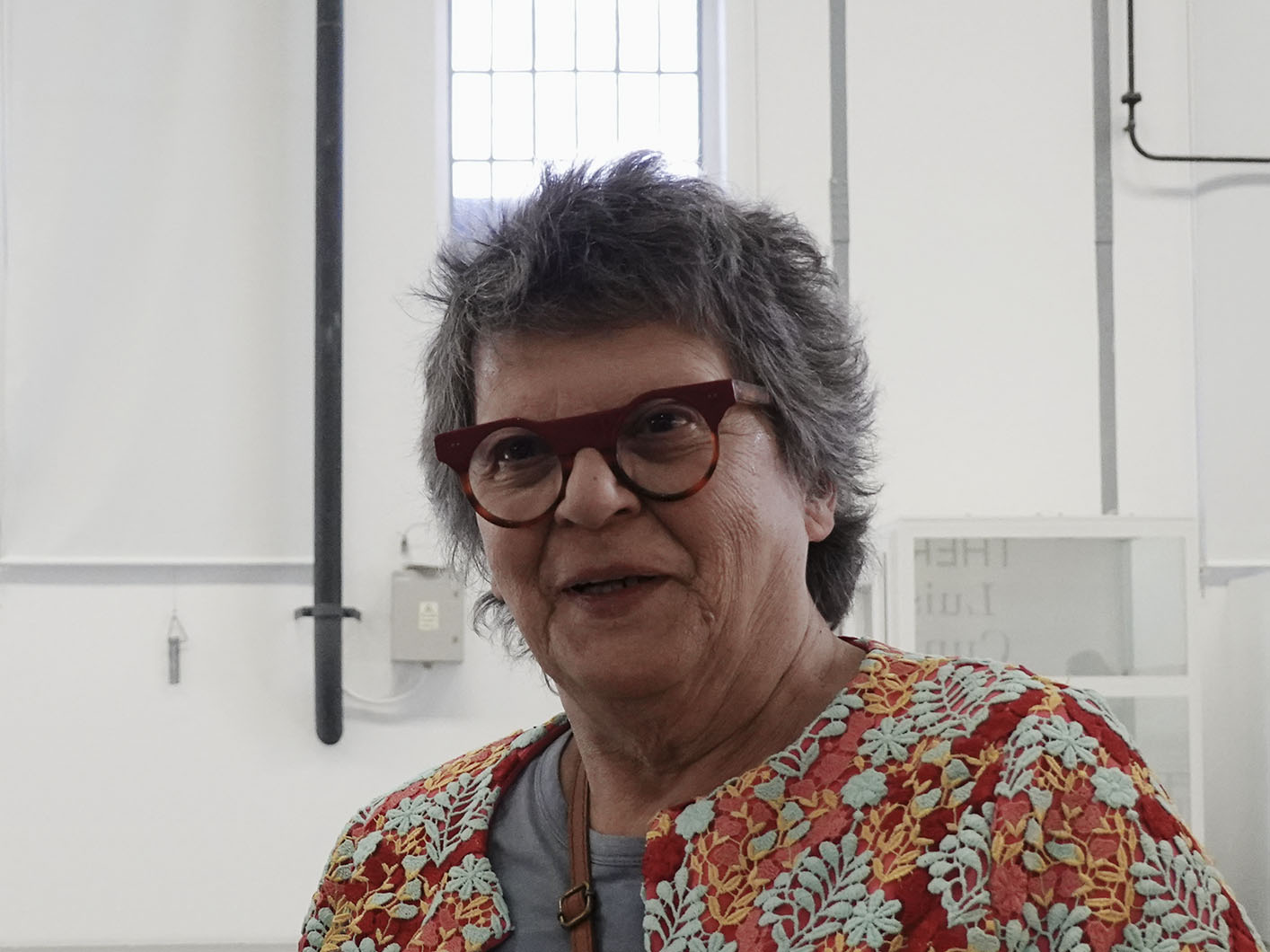
- Cunha in 2023
- Born: 1949; Lisbon, Portugal
- Died: 6 July 2026 (aged 77); Lisbon, Portugal
- Occupations: Painter, visual artist
- Known for: Painting, sculpture, photography, video
- Awards: 2021 EDP Foundation Art Grand Prize
- Website: luisacunha.com

Luisa Cunha (1949 – 6 July 2026) was a Portuguese painter and visual artist who won the EDP Foundation Art Grand Prize in 2021.

== Early life and education ==
Cunha was born in 1949 in the Portuguese capital of Lisbon, where she lived and worked. She studied at the Faculty of Arts of the University of Lisbon, where she graduated in Germanic Philology in 1975. Cunha did not begin a career as an artist until 1994, when she took a course in sculpture at AR.CO - Centro de Arte e Comunicação Visual, where she also taught until 1997.

== Career and recognition ==
Cunha's works can be found in several collections, including those of the Serralves Foundation, the Calouste Gulbenkian Foundation, and the António Cachola Collection at the Elvas Museum of Contemporary Art.

In 2021, she was awarded the EDP Foundation Art Grand Prize. Unanimously chosen by the jury for the award, the members highlighted her "originality, experimental boldness, multidisciplinarity, and pioneering use of new languages", also noting her influence on younger generations. The members of the jury also highlighted the way in which Cunha worked with space and sound based on verbal language, in a permanent game of construction and deconstruction of meanings. In making the award it said that "Luísa Cunha's work is beyond generational classifications, being an heir to the experiences of dematerialization of international art in the 1970s. As this is an award of recognition, it will certainly contribute to giving Luisa Cunha the public visibility that her artistic merit deserves". The jury also noted how influential she had been to younger generations.

She was one of the Portuguese women artists honoured by the exhibition Tudo O Que Eu Quero (All I want), at the Calouste Gulbenkian Museum. This was devoted solely to women artists and was part of the cultural programme of the Portuguese Presidency of the Council of the European Union in 2021. She was the Artist of the Month in the "Studio visits" project, as part of the 34th São Paulo Art Biennial, which was supported by the Portuguese Government, the EU Directorate-General for Arts (DGARTES), and the Calouste Gulbenkian Foundation.

Cunha won the 2022 AICA Visual Arts award for the exhibition "Partitura #4", on display at the Galeria Miguel Nabinho in Lisbon, and for her contribution at the "Gabinete" space at MAAT, with the piece Não (No).

== Retrospective ==
Cunha's first retrospective exhibition, Hello! Are You There?, was held as a result of her being awarded the EDP Foundation Art Grand Prize in 2021. Curated by Isabel Carlos, the MAAT exhibition covered the period from 1992 to 2022 and all the media in which she worked. This included sound, photography, video, drawing, and sculpture. Together with the exhibition, a catalogue of 280 pages covering 108 of her works done between 1997 and 2020 was published to go with the exhibition.

== Death ==
Cunha died from cancer in Lisbon, on 6 July 2026, at the age of 77.
