= Sónia Almeida =

Portuguese artist (born 1978)

- Born: 1978 (age 47–48); Lisbon, Portugal
- Education: Slade School of Fine Art; University of Lisbon
- Occupation: Artist
- Known for: Abstract

Sónia Almeida (born 1978) is a Portuguese artist who now lives and works in Boston, Massachusetts, in the US, where she teaches fine arts at Brandeis University.

== Early life and education ==
Almeida was born in the Portuguese capital, Lisbon, in 1978. She graduated in painting from the Faculty of Fine Arts of the University of Lisbon in 2001 and completed a master's in fine arts at the Slade School of Fine Art of the University College London in 2006. Between the two degrees, she spent some time in the Netherlands. In 2008, she moved to Boston to accompany her husband, who had obtained work there. She became a teaching assistant at the Massachusetts College of Art and Design and shared a studio or atelier in Somerville.

== Later career ==
She uses various materials, including wood and fabrics. Her maternal grandmother made clothing for her family and she and Almeida would go shopping for fabrics together and pick patterns. Like her grandmother she has collected large quantities of material. Her paintings often feature intense colours that are applied in patches. Influenced by the work of the Portuguese artist, Menez, it has been said that she explores the limits of figuration and abstraction. Her paintings and books express a reflection on the limits, rules, and directives set by the historical codes of painting, but it has also been said that her work invites multiple interpretations.

Since 2014 Almeida has taught painting, printmaking, artists' books and fabric arts at Brandeis. She has also taught at Harvard University and at the graduate center of Bard College. In 2014 she won an award from the Massachusetts Cultural Council, and in 2015 she was the recipient of a Pollock-Krasner Foundation grant. In 2017 she won a James and Audrey Foster Prize, which included an exhibition at the Institute of Contemporary Art, Boston (ICA). In 2024 she was shortlisted for the Foundwork Prize, and she was awarded a Guggenheim Fellowship.

Almeida is represented by the Simone Subal Gallery in New York City and holds regular solo exhibitions there. She has exhibited extensively elsewhere in the US, including at the List Visual Arts Center, the DeCordova Sculpture Park and Museum, the Museum of Fine Arts, Boston, and at the Institute of Contemporary Art in Portland, Maine.

In 2023 Almeida returned to Portugal for her first exhibition since 2009, bringing together 40 of her works over the previous 15 years. This was hosted by the Caixa Geral de Depósitos Foundation's Culturgest gallery and was accompanied by a 208-page catalogue. In Portugal she has also exhibited at the Serralves museum. In 2009 she had presented an exhibition called To be Abstract, also in Lisbon.

Almeida has also had solo exhibitions in Belgium and Italy. As a contributor to group shows, she has exhibited in the Czech Republic, Norway, and Poland. In 2021 her work was included in an exhibition of the art of 40 Portuguese women organized by the Calouste Gulbenkian Foundation in Lisbon.
