= Maria José Aguiar =

Maria José Aguiar may refer to:

- Maria José Aguiar (artist)
- Maria José Aguiar (politician)
