= Inês Botelho (artist) =

Portuguese artist (born 1977)

- Born: 1977; Lisbon, Portugal
- Occupation: Artist
- Known for: Sculpture, painting, installation art

Inês Botelho (born 1977) is a Portuguese sculptor and artist.

Botelho was born in 1977 in the Portuguese capital of Lisbon, where she lives and works. She graduated from the Faculty of Fine Arts of the University of Lisbon in 2001 and completed a master's degree at Hunter College, one of the constituent colleges of the City University of New York, in 2005. She also attended courses at Ar.Co - Centro de Arte & Comunicação Visual in Lisbon from 2002. Botelho has exhibited since 1998. In 2003, she was nominated for the EDP New Artists Award.

== Career ==
After her studies Botelho was able to continue her career with grants from several institutions, including the Calouste Gulbenkian Foundation, the National Cultural Centre in Portugal, the Luso-American Foundation, and the Directorate-General for the Arts of Portugal. She held artistic residencies at the Centro de Arte Moderna Gulbenkian (CAM) and the Galeria Zé dos Bois (2007); and at the Espaço do Desenho (2010). She has held several solo exhibitions, including at the Filomena Soares Gallery, in Lisbon; at the Pavilhão Branco (White Pavilion) of the City Museum in Lisbon; at Matadero Madrid; at Casa dos Dias da Água in Lisbon; Galeria Zé dos Bois in Lisbon and at the National Museum of Natural History and Science, Lisbon. In addition to Lisbon and Madrid, she has exhibited at Porto and Guimarães in Portugal. Her works are represented in the collections of the EDP Foundation, the PLMJ Foundation, and CAM, among others.

Her works have been included in the following joint exhibitions, among others:

- All I Want– Portuguese Female Artists from 1900 to 2020 (2021, Gulbenkian Museum, Lisbon);
- Imagined Spaces (2020, National Society for Fine Arts, Lisbon);
- Half of the Sky (2019, Árpád Szenes-Vieira da Silva Foundation, Lisbon);
- LandArt Cascais (2018, Quinta do Pisão, Cascais);
- Pleasure of the spirit and the gaze, Landscape and Journey (2017, Azores).

Botelho's work has included sculpture, installation and drawing, mainly with India ink. Her sculptures are almost always in painted clay and moulded on a potter's wheel. It has been observed that she is "inspired by nature's cycles: solar trajectories, water tides, and laws of attraction" and that in her work "she applies geometry to sculpt and draw shifting paradigms". It has been said that the concept of gravity is central to her work and that she is fascinated by themes linked to science, physics and the mathematical precision of certain movements.
