= Patrícia Garrido =

Portuguese artist

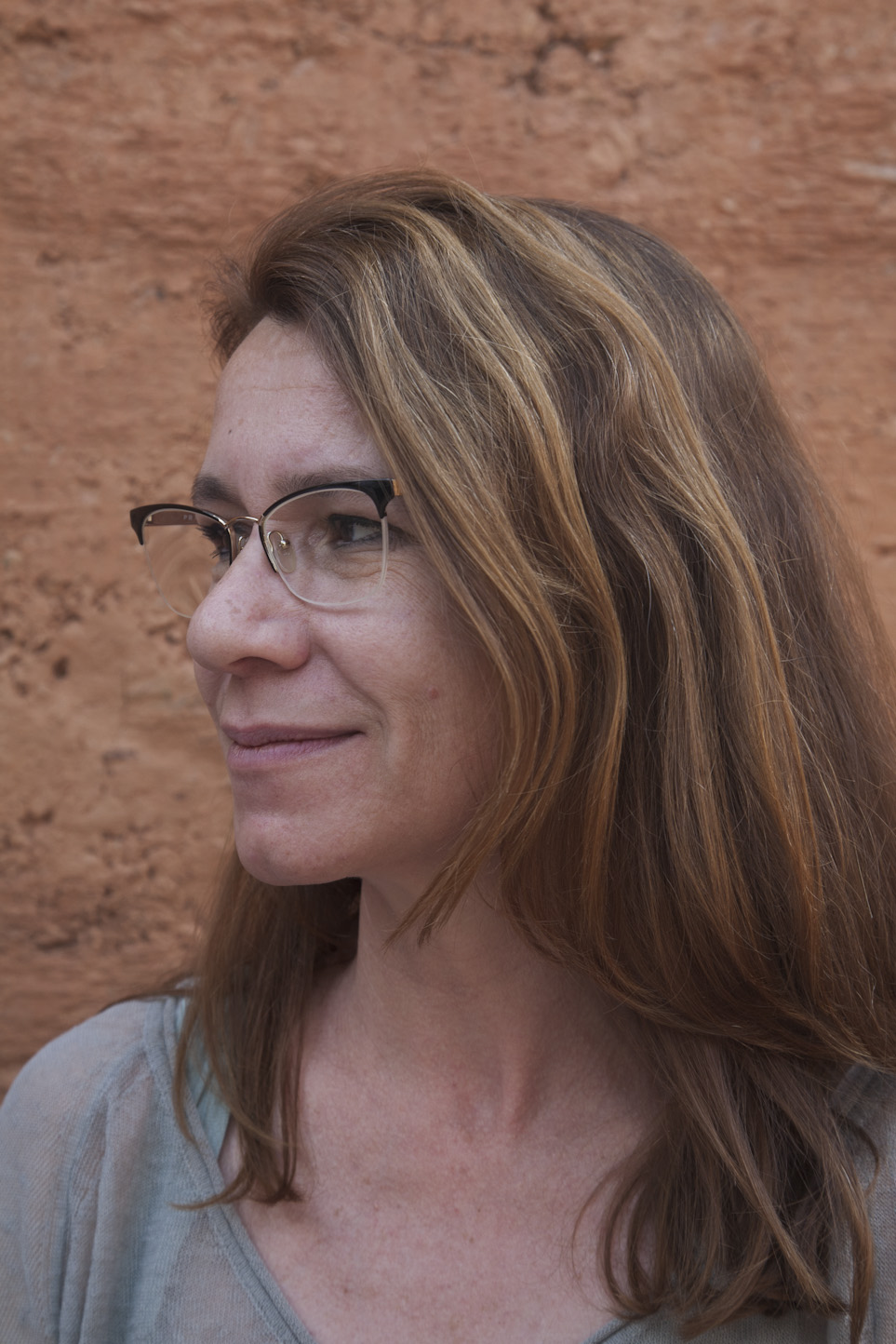
- Born: 1963 (age 62–63); Lisbon, Portugal
- Known for: Painting, sculpture, installation art
- Awards: Prémio de Artes Plásticas União Latina, 1998

Patrícia Garrido (born 1963) is a Portuguese painter, sculptor and installation artist.

== Early life and education ==
Garrido was born in 1963 in the Portuguese capital of Lisbon, where she continues to live and work. From 1982 to 1989 she studied painting at the Lisbon School of Fine Arts, now the Faculty of Fine Arts at the University of Lisbon.

== Career ==
Garrido's first solo exhibition was of her paintings in Porto in 1988. This was followed by an exhibition of drawings in Lisbon in the same year, followed by a painting exhibition in Lisbon in 1989 and another exhibition of paintings at the Galeria Monumental in Lisbon in 1991. In 1994 in Lisbon she presented Jogos de Cama (Bed games) in which an installation was presented made from the assembly of several hammocks. In O prazer é todo meu (The pleasure is all mine), held in Funchal, Madeira in 1994 she exhibited a series of sensual objects modelled after her own body, covered with the tones and shine of her makeup.

In 1995 at the National Museum of Contemporary Art of Chiado in Lisbon, Garrido held an exhibition called Jogo de Damas (Game of Draughts or Checkers) in which she appropriated everyday objects for her art. She then embarked on a series of exhibitions inspired by houses that she had lived in. Portuguese housing advertisements indicate the number of bedrooms with the letter T, so that T3 is a three-bedroomed house. Her first exhibition on this theme was held at the Serralves Contemporary Art Museum near Porto, and was called T6. Between 1997 and 1998 she also created "floor plans" or "standard apartments" with exhibitions called TO, T1, T2, and T4. The T4 installation was shown in Plovdiv in Bulgaria. In 2002 she had an exhibition called Tectos Falsos (False Roofs) at the Tagus Power Station in Lisbon, now the Museum of Art, Architecture and Technology, as well as at an exhibition in Faro in the Algarve.

In Móveis ao Cubo (Cubed Furniture), shown between 2009 and 2013, she gathered furniture from the António Arroio Arts School in Lisbon, from various homes and from her parents' apartment where she herself grew up. She then sawed all the furniture into pieces of more or less the same size, glued them together, and formed compact cubes weighing hundreds of kilos, one for each origin. The aim was to transform each set with the identity of those who used and lived in the building into signs of the passage of life.

Also in 2009, she exhibited under the title of Peças Mais ou Menos Recentes (More or less recent pieces) at the Gallery of the EDP Foundation in Lisbon and at the Soares dos Reis National Museum in Porto. Continuing to exhibit, her exhibition in Lisbon in 2020 was called Mais do mesmo (More of the same). In 2024 in an exhibition called Casas (Houses), visitors attempted to find a space that could be experienced in comfort. Instead, they were faced with an installation consisting of metal elements that intersected throughout the gallery, preventing them from experiencing the completeness of an inhabited space. The exhibition therefore aimed to give a feeling of renouncing the idea of home. It was held at the Sociedade Nacional de Belas Artes (National Society of Fine Arts) in Lisbon.

Throughout her career, Garrido has obsessively recorded, measured, counted, and listed things, such as everything she consumed during two weeks, all the clothes she owned at a certain time or the number of steps she took inside the house to complete a kilometre. Her work uses abstract and mathematical concepts. Starting from the idea of herself as a measure of things, she uses her physical and intellectual experiences as the central theme of her work, which is to be found in many collections including those of the municipality of Lisbon, the Portuguese state, the Serralves Foundation, the EDP Foundation, the Contemporary Art Museum of Funchal, and the National Museum of Contemporary Art of Chiado.

== Awards and recognition ==
Garrido was awarded the Prémio de Artes Plásticas União Latina in 1998. In 2021 she was one of 40 Portuguese women artists exhibited as part of the Calouste Gulbenkian Museum's exhibition entitled All I want: Portuguese Women Artists from 1900 to 2020.
