= Clara Menéres =

Portuguese artist (1943–2018)

- Born: Maria Clara Rebelo de Carvalho Menéres; 22 August 1943; Braga, Portugal
- Died: 10 May 2018 (aged 74); Lisbon, Portugal
- Known for: Sculpture

Clara Menéres (1943–2018) was a Portuguese sculptor and teacher. She worked in stone, plastic, metal, neon and embroidery, among other materials. Her subjects ranged from feminist and erotic art in the 1960s and 1970s, to religious art in the later years of her life.

== Early life and education ==
Maria Clara Rebelo de Carvalho Menéres was born in the municipality of Braga, Portugal on 22 August 1943. She studied sculpture at the Escola Superior de Belas-Artes do Porto (School of Fine Arts of Porto), now part of the University of Porto, where she was a student of pt: Salvador Barata Feyo, pt: Lagoa Henriques and pt: Júlio Resende, completing her degree in 1968 with the presentation of the work A Menina Amélia que vive na Rua do Almada (Miss Amélia who lives in Rua do Almada). She exhibited individually for the first time in 1967 at the Borges Gallery in Aveiro, with ceramic work.

Menéres was a bursary student of the Calouste Gulbenkian Foundation in Paris from 1978 to 1981 and in the United States from 1988 to 1990. She received a PhD in ethnology from the University of Paris VII in 1983 and was a research fellow at the Center for Advanced Visual Studies at the Massachusetts Institute of Technology from 1989 to 1991.

== Teaching career ==
Menéres started her teaching activity at the School of Fine Arts in Porto, and then moved to the School of Fine Arts in Lisbon (now the Faculty of Fine Arts of the University of Lisbon), where, between 1993 and 1996, she held the position of chair of the board of directors. She then became associate professor and then full professor at the University of Évora, where she taught from 1996 to 2007.

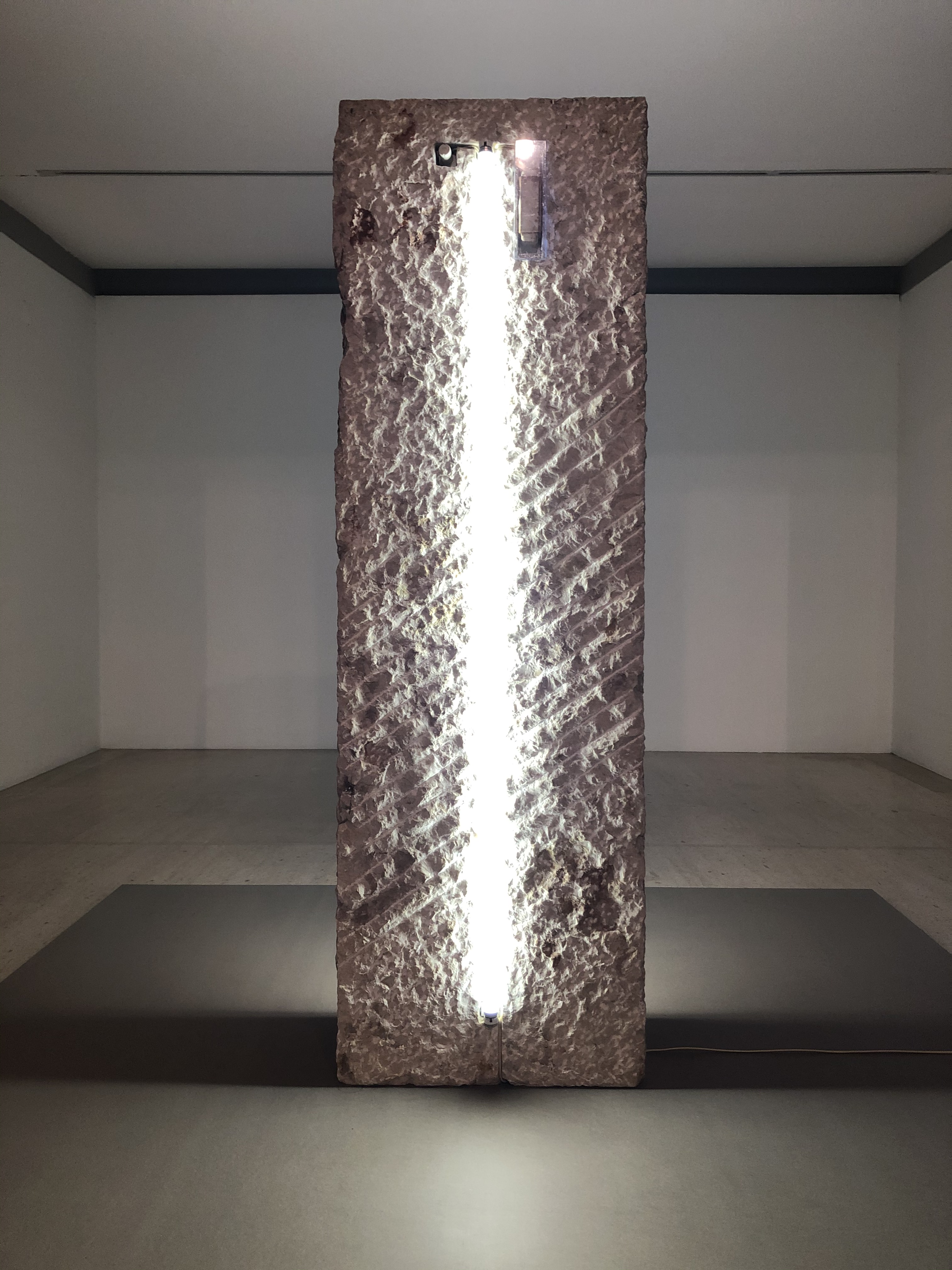
Clara Meneres Lapis Cognitionis, 1987 exhibited at the Calouste Gulbenkian Museum, December 2019.

== Exhibitions ==
Menéres' work has been shown at exhibitions in Portugal, Brazil and the United Kingdom. Her solo exhibitions included those at the Borges Gallery in 1967; at the Publicity Gallery, Porto in 1968; at the Nasoni Gallery, Porto in 1987; at the Loja do Desenho in Lisbon in 1988; at the Jadite Gallery in New York City in 1990; at CAVS-MIT in Cambridge, Massachusetts in 1990; and at the Cooperativa Árvore in Porto in 1991.

Posthumously, her work has been exhibited at an exhibition at the Calouste Gulbenkian Museum in Lisbon, entitled Women in the modern collection. From Sonia Delaunay to Ângela Ferreira, 1916-2018, which brought together more than a hundred works by women artists, produced over the last century in Portugal. In 2021, her work was included in another exhibition at the Gulbenkian, entitled Tudo O Que Eu Quero (All I want), which was part of the cultural programme of the Portuguese Presidency of the Council of the European Union.

Menéres worked in stone, plastic, metal, neon and embroidery, among other materials. Her subjects ranged from feminist and erotic art in the 1960s and 1970s, to religious art in the later years of her life. In 1977 she made Woman-Earth-Mother, a powerfully symbolic work which is now unanimously considered as a fundamental of feminism in Portugal, combining the political consciousness of gender with the vocabulary of international pop art, in an explicit representation of the sex of a woman. In the 1980s she became known as the "light sculptor" for the use of light in her work. Her last works included sculptures for the Sanctuary of Fátima and a statue of Pope John Paul II.

== Politics ==
Menéres was an unsuccessful candidate for Libertas.eu in the 2009 European Parliament election. In the same year she stood, also unsuccessfully, for the Earth Party (Partido da Terra) in the Portuguese national election.

== Death ==
Menéres died on 10 May 2018 in a hospital in Lisbon.
