= Armanda Duarte =

Portuguse artist (born 1961)

- Born: 1961 (age 64–65); Praia do Ribatejo, Vila Nova da Barquinha, Portugal
- Known for: Installations
- Movement: Contemporary

Armanda Duarte (born 1961) is a Portuguese contemporary and installation artist.

== Early life ==
Duarte was born in 1961 in the village of Praia do Ribatejo, in the municipality of Vila Nova da Barquinha, Portugal. She graduated in design and communication from the Faculty of Fine Arts of the University of Lisbon and lives and works in Lisbon.

== Artistic career ==
Duarte's work integrates drawing, sculpture, installation, and architecture, and involves the manipulation and composition of everyday objects. She draws inspiration from the gestures of daily life, revealing the networks of exchange that form the foundation of a community. She received support from the Calouste Gulbenkian Foundation in 1996 and from the Luso-American Foundation for Development (FLAD) in 2001. Further sponsorship was provided by the Gulbenkian in 2006. Since the late 1980s she has exhibited regularly, both in individual and collective exhibitions. In 2021 she was one of 40 artists chosen by the Gulbenkian for an exhibition of 20th-century Portuguese women's art, called All I Want (Tudo O Que Eu Quero).

Between 1996 and 2011 she was a teacher in the drawing and painting department of the independent art school, Ar.Co, in Lisbon and also taught in other institutions in the city. Her work is present in the collections of the Portuguese bank, Caixa Geral de Depósitos, of the EDP Group Foundation, of the PLMJ Law Firm Foundation, of the Lisbon City Council, of the Portuguese State Contemporary Art Collection (CACE), and in that of the artist Pedro Cabrita Reis as well as in other private collections.

== Solo exhibitions ==
Duarte's solo exhibitions have been:

- 2019. Sismografo, Porto; Porta 14, Lisbon
- 2018. Guarda; Museu de São Roque, Lisbon
- 2017. tu (with Thierry Simões), Caroline Pagès Gallery, Lisbon; L'Art dans les Chapelles, Pontivy, France
- 2015. Tambor, Pavilhão Branco – Museu da Cidade de Lisbon
- 2014. Bainha, O Armario, Lisbon; Levantamento, A Montra, Lisbon
- 2012. Desculpa, grilo, roubei a tua casinha, Caroline Pagès Gallery, Lisbon
- 2010. Três degraus, uma laje, Chiado 8, Lisbon
- 2009. Uma Combinação (2) (with Linda Sanchez), Centre d'Art La BF15, Lyon, France
- 2008. Subtracções, Caroline Pagès Gallery, Lisbon; Uma Combinação, Plataforma Revólver, Lisbon
- 2005. Duas Vezes, Vera Cortês Agency, Lisbon
- 2001. O último passeio e a luz do meu atelier, Paula Fampa Gallery, Braga; Os livros da Matilde, Lisbon
- 1999. Sopro frio nas orelhas, National Museum of Natural History-Sala do Veado, Lisbon
- 1996. ANJE, Faro
- 1993. Também devem ser semeadas logo que deixam a árvore que lhes deu origem, National Museum of Natural History-Sala do Veado, Lisbon
- 1989. Exposição de pintura, Monumental Gallery/Bertrand, Lisbon
- 1988. Roda Rotunda, Atneu Casapiano, Lisbon
