= Gabriela Albergaria =

Portuguese artist

- Born: 20 July 1965 (age 60); Vale de Cambra, Aveiro District, Portugal
- Known for: Installation, drawing
- Website: https://www.gabrielaalbergaria.com/

Gabriela Albergaria (born 1965) is a Portuguese artist who has lived in New York City since 2011. Her work draws on the concept of landscape to create an awareness of the relationship between people and their environment.

== Early life and education ==
Albergaria was born in Vale de Cambra in the Aveiro District of Portugal on 20 July 1965. She graduated in painting at the Faculty of Fine Arts of the University of Porto.

== Artistic career ==
Albergaria's artistic work draws on the concept of landscape, using a combination of photography, drawing, sculpture and installation. Her artistic projects are designed to make people think about the relationship between human societies and the environment and reflect on issues such as the influence of human action on the processes of landscape transformation or the modification of ecosystems through the importation of non-native plant species.

Since 1999 Albergaria has exhibited regularly around the world. Solo shows and installations have included those at the Socrates Sculpture Park in New York City in 2015 and in São Paulo and Caracas, Venezuela in 2013. Group exhibitions she has contributed to have included those in New York in 2014; in Santiago de Compostela in Spain in 2013; at the first Montevideo Biennale in 2012; at the Contemporary Jewish Museum in San Francisco in 2012; in Lima, Peru in 2012; and at the Fuglsang Art Museum in Denmark in 2009. Most recently, her work was part of an exhibition of Portuguese female artists at the Calouste Gulbenkian Museum, entitled Tudo o que eu quero (All that I want), which was part of the cultural programme of the Portuguese Presidency of the Council of the European Union.

Albergaria's first retrospective exhibition was held at the Caixa Geral de Depósitos Foundation in Lisbon in 2021. It brought together works produced in Germany, Colombia, Brazil, the United Kingdom and Belgium, including an installation she made at the Belém Cultural Centre in 2005, consisting of a huge tree.

== Collections ==
Albergaria's work is held by several collections, including the Luís Augusto Teixeira de Freitas Collection in Portugal, the Museum of Modern Art of Bahia in Salvador, Bahia, Brazil, the collections of the KfW Bank and Deutsche Bank in Germany, the Calouste Gulbenkian Foundation in Lisbon, the EDP Foundation in Portugal, and the Caixa Geral de Depósitos in Lisbon.
