= Rosa Carvalho =

Portuguese feminist artist

- Born: 1952 (age 73–74); Lisbon, Portugal
- Known for: Painting

Rosa Carvalho (born 1952) is a Portuguese artist.

== Early life and education ==
Rosa Carvalho was born in Lisbon in 1952. She studied fine arts at the University of Lisbon.

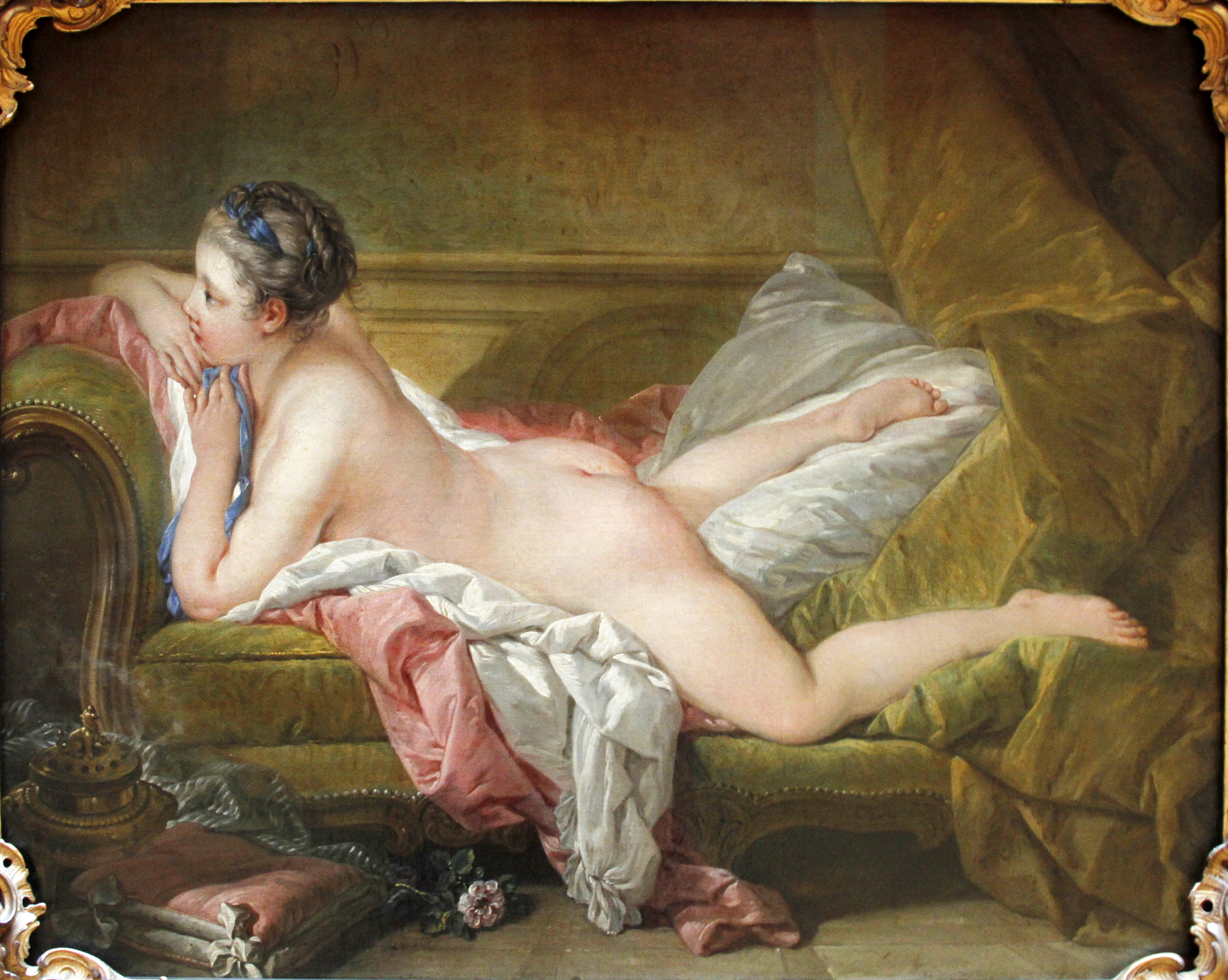
The Blonde Odalisque (original) by François Boucher, one of the pieces reworked by Carvalho

== Artistic work ==
Carvalho is particularly known for painstakingly reproducing works by painters such as François Boucher, Francisco de Goya, Rembrandt, Jacques-Louis David and Diego Velasquez, in which she removes the, often naked, female figures present in the original paintings, thus highlighting the under-representation of women in art or their excessive presence in history as a muse and not a creator. Examples of paintings that she has treated in this way include Portrait of Madame Récamier by David and The Blonde Odalisque by Boucher.

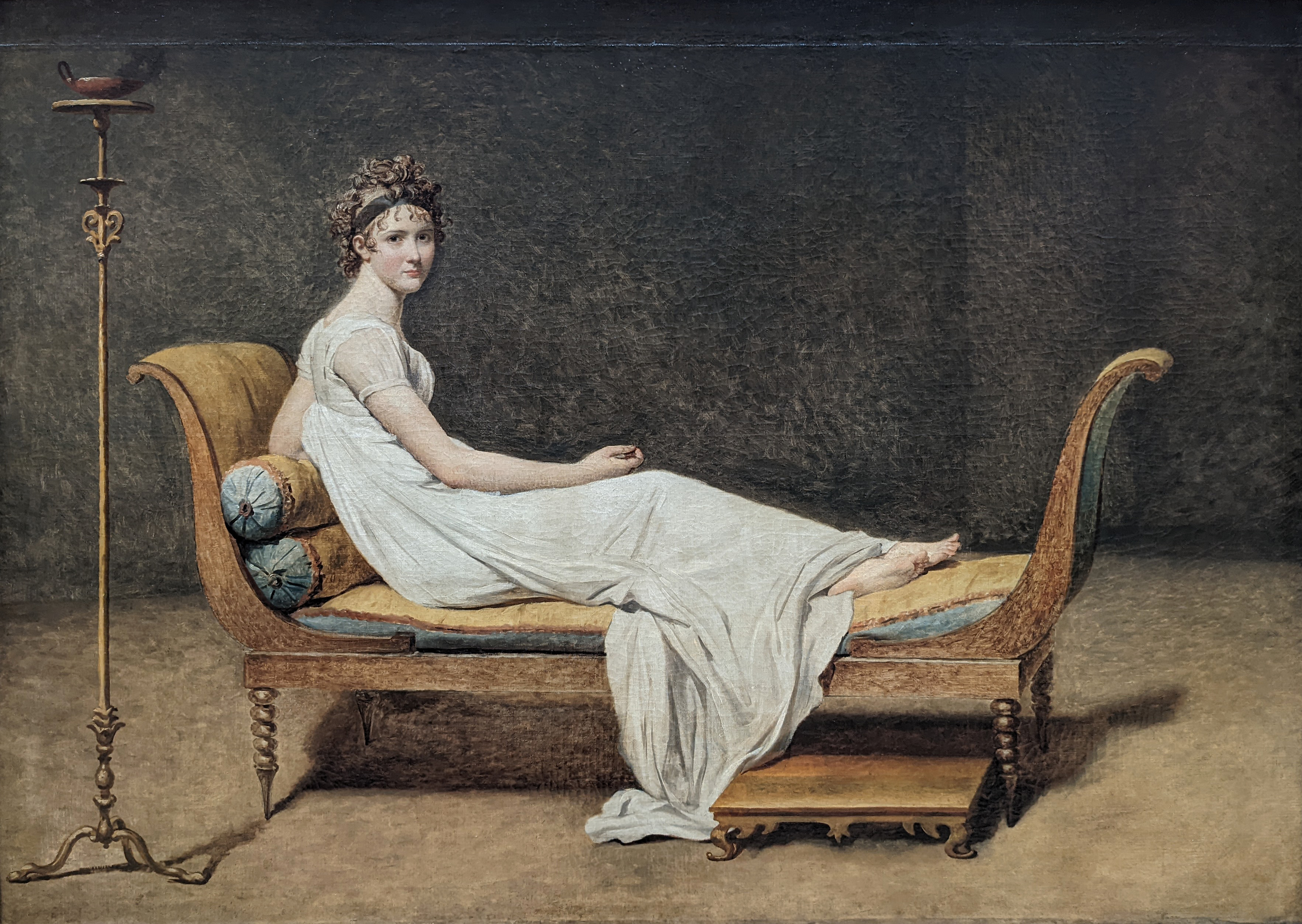
Portrait of Madame Récamier (original) by Jacques-Louis David, also re-envisaged by Carvalho

== Exhibitions ==
Carvalho first exhibited in exhibitions of modern art in Lagos, Portugal and in Porto in 1982. Her first solo exhibition was in 1985 in Lisbon. Mainly exhibiting in Portugal, she has also had two solo exhibitions in Belgium. In collective exhibitions her work has been shown in Brazil, Germany, Mozambique and Spain. Her work was exhibited in 2021 as part of an exhibition of 40 Portuguese female artists at the Calouste Gulbenkian Museum, entitled Tudo o que eu quero (All that I want), which was part of the cultural programme of the Portuguese Presidency of the Council of the European Union.

== Collections ==
The work of Carvalho is held by a large number of collections, including those of the Portuguese Ministry of Foreign Affairs and Secretary of State for Culture, Energias de Portugal, Calouste Gulbenkian Foundation, and the Galp Foundation.
