= Maria Capelo =

Portuguese artist (born 1970)

- Born: 1970 (age 55–56); Lisbon, Portugal
- Known for: Painting
- Awards: FLAD Drawing Prize in 2022
- Website: https://mariacapelo.com/maria_capelo_en.html

Maria Capelo (born 1970) is a Portuguese artist who paints mainly landscapes with Indian ink. She was the unanimous winner among the judges of the FLAD Drawing Prize in 2022.

== Early life ==
Capelo was born in the Portuguese capital of Lisbon in 1970. She studied painting at the Faculty of Fine Arts of the University of Lisbon, graduating in 1992. She continues to live in Lisbon.

== Career ==
Capelo first exhibited in 1996 and since then she has exhibited at numerous group and solo exhibitions. Although her paintings give the impression that they could be anywhere, her landscapes are always based on actual places. Her favourite locations for inspiration are the Baixo Alentejo Province of Portugal, the Piedmont region of Italy, and Extremadura in Spain.

In 2013 she received a grant from the Calouste Gulbenkian Foundation to carry out a project called Da Sombra dos Montes (From the shadow of the mountains), as part of the foundation's "Support for Visual Arts – Artistic Research Projects" Programme. At the end of 2021 the foundation's Modern Art Centre (CAM) purchased two of her paintings for its collection. In 2021 she was exhibited as part of the Calouste Gulbenkian Museum's exhibition entitled All I want: Portuguese Women Artists from 1900 to 2020.

In 2022 Capelo was the winner of the Fundação Luso-Americana - Para o Desenvolvimento (Luso-American Development Foundation– FLAD) Drawing Prize, winning €20,000. All three of the judges selected her as the winner, observing that "Maria Capelo's work reveals a curious sense of adventure, producing images that are only apparently simple, from which she is able to recreate the landscape tradition in an innovative and surprising way".

== Recent Exhibitions ==
Capelo's recent exhibitions have included:

=== Solo ===
- 2023. O dia já fecha as portas (The Day already closes its doors). MAAT, Lisbon.
- 2022. Vento Espesso (Thick wind). Museu da Cidade, Casa Guerra Junqueiro, Porto
- 2022. Do planalto se dobra a montanha (From the plateau the mountain bends). Museu da Cidade, Palacete Viscondes de Balsemão, Porto and Galeria Zé dos Bois, Lisbon
- 2019. As coisas do mundo são rocha (The things of the world are rock). Pavilhão Branco, Lisbon
- 2017. Deita-te, levanta-te e agora deita-te (Lie down, get up and now lie down). Fundação Carmona e Costa, Lisbon

=== Collective ===
- 2021. Tudo o que eu quero (All I want). Fundação Calouste Gulbenkian e CCOD, Lisbon.
- 2019. Taking Root. KIT – Kunst im Tunnel, Düsseldorf
- 2019. Pedro Costa: Companhia. Fundação de Serralves, Porto.
- 2017. RE: Imagining Europe. BOX Freiraum, Berlin
