= Fernanda Fragateiro =

Portuguese artist

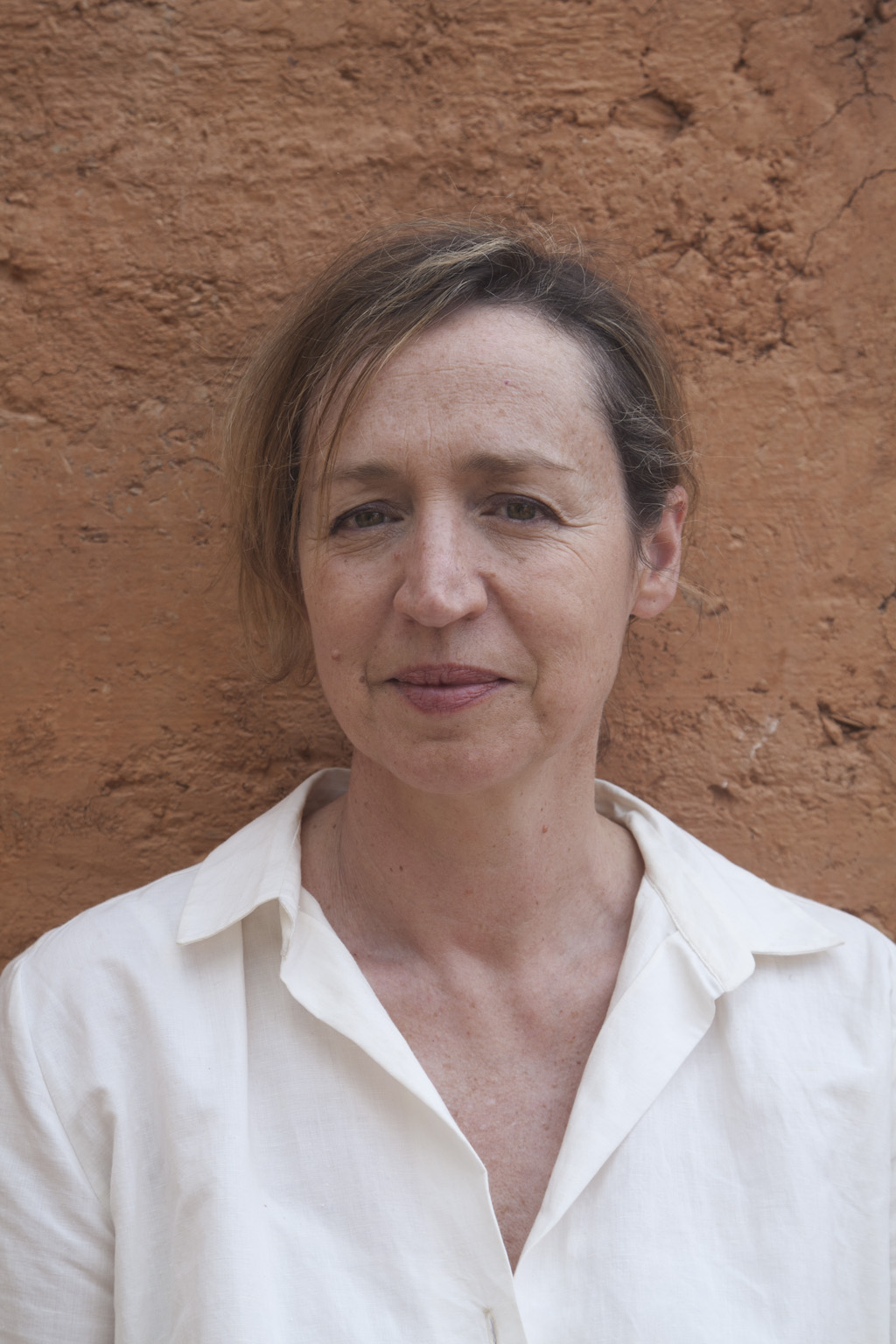
- Fragateiro in 2014
- Born: 1962 (age 63–64); Montijo, Portugal
- Known for: Sculpture and installation
- Website: https://www.fernandafragateiro.com/

Fernanda Fragateiro (born 1962) is a Portuguese artist and sculptor who mainly collaborates with architects and landscape architects.

== Early life and education ==
Fragateiro was born in 1962 at Montijo in the Setúbal District of Portugal. From 1978 to 1981, she studied at the Escola Secundária Artística António Arroio, a secondary school that specialises in the applied arts. From 1981 to 1982 she studied at the Centre for Art and Visual Communication (AR.CO) and from 1983 to 1987 at the Lisbon School of Fine Arts, now the Faculty of Arts of the University of Lisbon.

== Artistic career ==
Fernanda Fragateiro is best known for her site-specific sculptures and architectural interventions in unexpected locations, often collaborating with architects and landscape architects. Throughout her career she has used sculpture and installation as her main means of expression. Her works are sometimes just subtle interventions or additions to an existing landscape. Her smaller sculptures are often made from found metals and mass-produced goods. She considers herself to be reinterpreting minimalism, which often involves subtle alterations to existing landscapes or objects.

Between 1997 and 1999, Fragateiro taught illustration at AR.CO, and between 1999 and 2000 she taught postgraduate courses in urban design at the Centro Português de Design, both in Lisbon. She collaborated with the Jardim das Ondas (Wave Garden), the Jardins da Água (Water Gardens) and the Jardins de Ulisses (Ulysses' Gardens), created for the 1998 Lisbon World Exposition, in what is now the Parque das Nações. In 2016, during the Summer Festival of the Calouste Gulbenkian Museum, she distributed sculptures around the museum's gardens in Lisbon.

== Exhibitions ==
Fragateiro regularly exhibits her work in Portugal and abroad. Her most recent exhibitions have included those at the Coimbra Contemporary Art Biennial (2017), the Museum of Art, Architecture and Technology (MAAT) in Lisbon (2017), the Galleria Nazionale d'Arte Moderna in Rome (2017), the Eugénio de Almeida Foundation in Évora, Portugal (2017 and 2015), the Palm Springs Art Museum in California (2016), the Calouste Gulbenkian Museum in Lisbon (2016, 2012 and 2004); the CaixaForum Barcelona (2016 and 2004), the Orlando Museum of Art, in Florida (2015), the Carpenter Center for the Visual Arts at Harvard University (2015), the Bronx Museum of the Arts in New York (2014), and the Museo Universitario Arte Contemporáneo in Mexico City (2014).

== Collections ==
The work of Fragateiro is represented in several Collections, such as the Ella Fontanals-Cisneros Collection, Miami; the Museo Nacional Centro de Arte Reina Sofía, Madrid; Museum of Contemporary Art Helga de Alvear in Cáceres, Spain; the Colecção António Cachola in Elvas, Portugal; the Fundación Claudia Hakim in Bogotá, Colombia; the Museo Extremeño e Iberoamericano de Arte Contemporáneo in Badajoz, Spain; the Museu de Serralves in Porto, Portugal; and the Calouste Gulbenkian Foundation in Lisbon.
