= Maria José Oliveira =

Portuguese artist

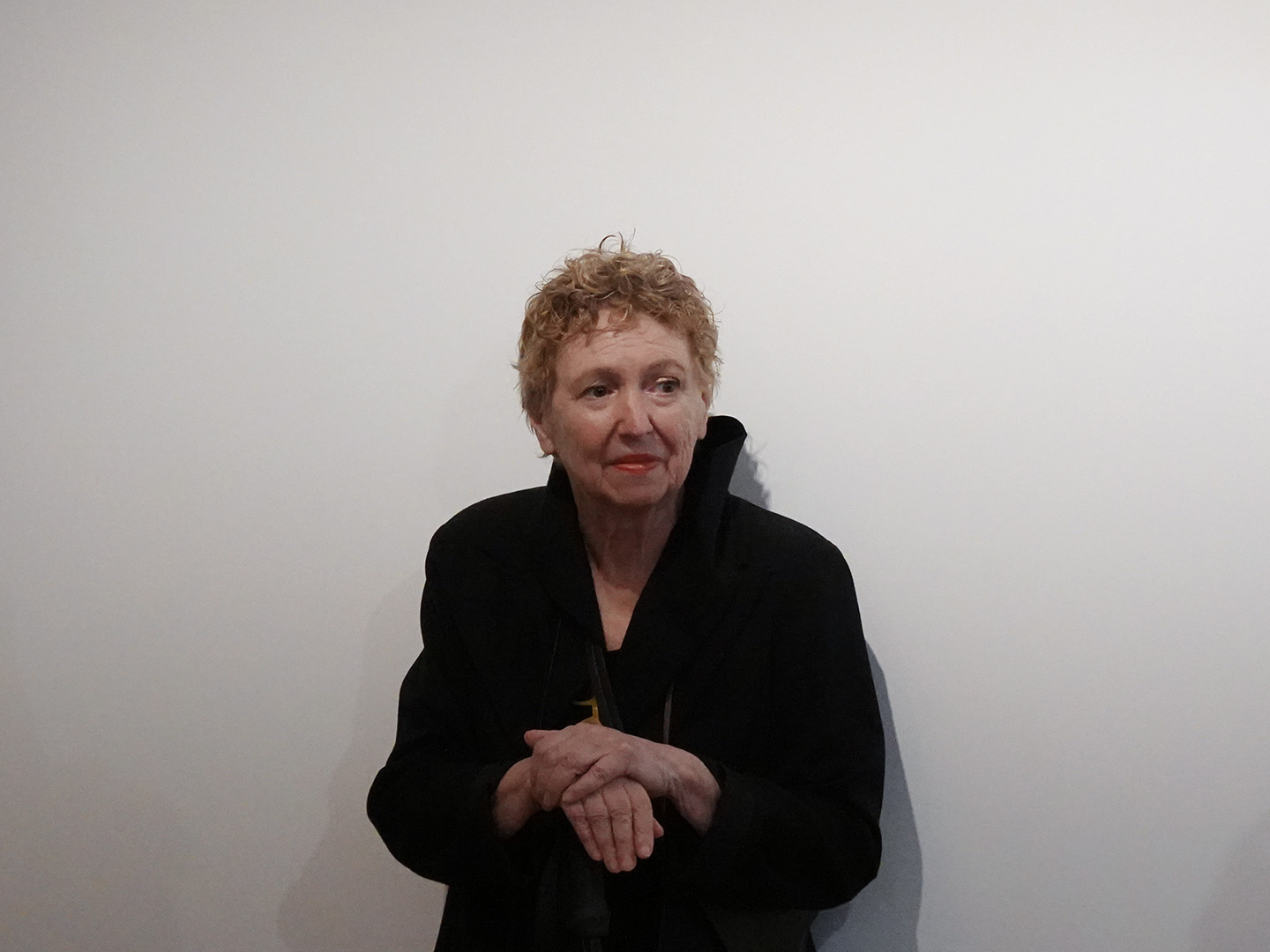
- Born: 1943; Lisbon, Portugal
- Occupation: Artist
- Known for: Ceramics, sculpture, jewellery, installation art

Maria José Oliveira (born 1943) is a Portuguese artist. Beginning as a ceramicist she extended her art to include drawing, collage, jewellery, sculpture, and installation. She has had many solo exhibitions and her works have been included in several important group exhibitions.

== Early life and education ==
Oliveira was born in the Portuguese capital of Lisbon in 1943. She began working with ceramics in the late 1960s, learning the technique of floor-standing kilns in Ribolhos in the Viseu District from Maestro Albino, considered the last traditional potter in Portugal. She then studied ceramics at IADE Faculty of Design, Technology and Communication, part of the European University of Lisbon, between 1973 and 1976. In 1978 and 1979 she attended the independent art school, Ar.Co., to study sculpture.

== Artistic career ==
Oliveira received a scholarship from the Calouste Gulbenkian Foundation in 1991 and in 1996 a subsidy from the same foundation to prepare an exhibition held at the National Museum of Ancient Art in Lisbon, titled: Dimensions – From the Life of the Earth, held in 1999. She was a visiting professor at the Ceramics Department of Ar.Co from 1991 to 1995.

She has exhibited regularly since 1982 and in 2017 she held a retrospective exhibition:, Maria José Oliveira: 40 anos de Trabalho (Maria José Oliveira: 40 Years of Work) at the Sociedade Nacional de Belas Artes in Lisbon, establishing her work as some of the most important in Portuguese contemporary art. She is represented in several museums and private collections.

Oliveira uses common or garden raw materials of no intrinsic value to create works of art, including her jewellery designs, which eschew the use of valuable metals or stones, and have been called "anti-bourgeois". Most of her works are composed of natural and organic materials, some of which are degradable, such as plant residues, dried leaves, eggs, vegetable resin, bread dough, baker's oven ash, and handmade paper. She has said that all materials are good, you just have not to be afraid to use them. Her colours are sober, varying from neutral colours to red and golden ochres. She has been called "an artist of the colours of the earth, of golden yellows, of the infinity of shades of grey, of lime washes, of porcelain whites, of the tones and timbres of graphite and charcoal" by the art historian Raquel Henriques da Silva.

== Solo exhibitions ==
Oliveira has had the following solo exhibitions:

- Artefacto 3, Lisbon, 1987;
- Museu Nacional do Traje, Lisbon, 1988;
- Galeria Arcada, Estoril, 1989;
- Sociedade Nacional de Belas Artes (SNBA), Lisbon, 1990;
- Giefarte, Lisbon, 1994;
- Galeria Trem e Arco, Faro, 1997;
- Galeria Municipal de Faro, Faro, 1997;
- Galeria Diferença, Lisbon, 1997;
- Deer Room, Natural History Museum, Lisbon, 1998;
- Tavira House of Arts, Tavira, 1998;
- Jars – Tiles, Ceramic Objects and Drawings, Ratton Gallery, Lisbon, 2000;
- Bissaya Barreto House-Museum, Coimbra, 2001;
- Diferença Gallery, Lisbon, 2001;
- Giefarte, Lisbon, 2001;
- Évora-Arte, Évora, 2002;
- Calouste Gulbenkian Library, 2002;
- Nature/Culture, Almeida Moreira Museum – Grão Vasco, Viseu, 2003;
- But Where We Are is the Light – First part, Arte e Manifesto Gallery, Porto, 2003;
- But Where We Are is the Light – Second part, Giefarte Gallery, Lisbon, 2004;
- 20 to 6, Jorge Shirley Gallery, Lisbon, 2004;
- Analogies, Giefarte, Lisbon, 2006;
- Cyclical, Artadentro Gallery, Faro, 2006;
- The Geometry of Time, Carmona e Costa Foundation, Lisbon, 2007;
- The Container Body, Jorge Shirley Gallery, Lisbon, 2008;
- Shadow Cone, Line of Light", Ashtray 8 – Electricity Museum, Lisbon, 2010;
- The Current Affairs of the Egg and the Chicken, Espaço Quadrado, Galeria Diferença, Lisbon, 2016;
- Maria José Oliveira- 40 years of work, SNBA, Lisbon, 2017;
- We are here because we flew, Faro Municipal Museum, Faro, 2021;
- The invention of another, Rainha Dona Leonor Museum, Beja, 2022.
- The Container Body, Casa da Cerca, Centro de Arte Contemporânea, Almada, 2023
- Maria José Oliveira – 50 Anos em Companhia, Galeria Fernando Santos, Lisbon, 2023
- Universes in Travel, Centro para os Assuntos da Arte e Arquitectura, Guimarães, 2024

== Group exhibitions ==
Her works have been exhibited at many group exhibitions. Perhaps the most notable was in 2021 when she was one of 40 Portuguese women artists exhibited as part of the Calouste Gulbenkian Museum's exhibition entitled All I want: Portuguese Women Artists from 1900 to 2020.
