= Isabel Carvalho =

Portuguese artist (born 1977)

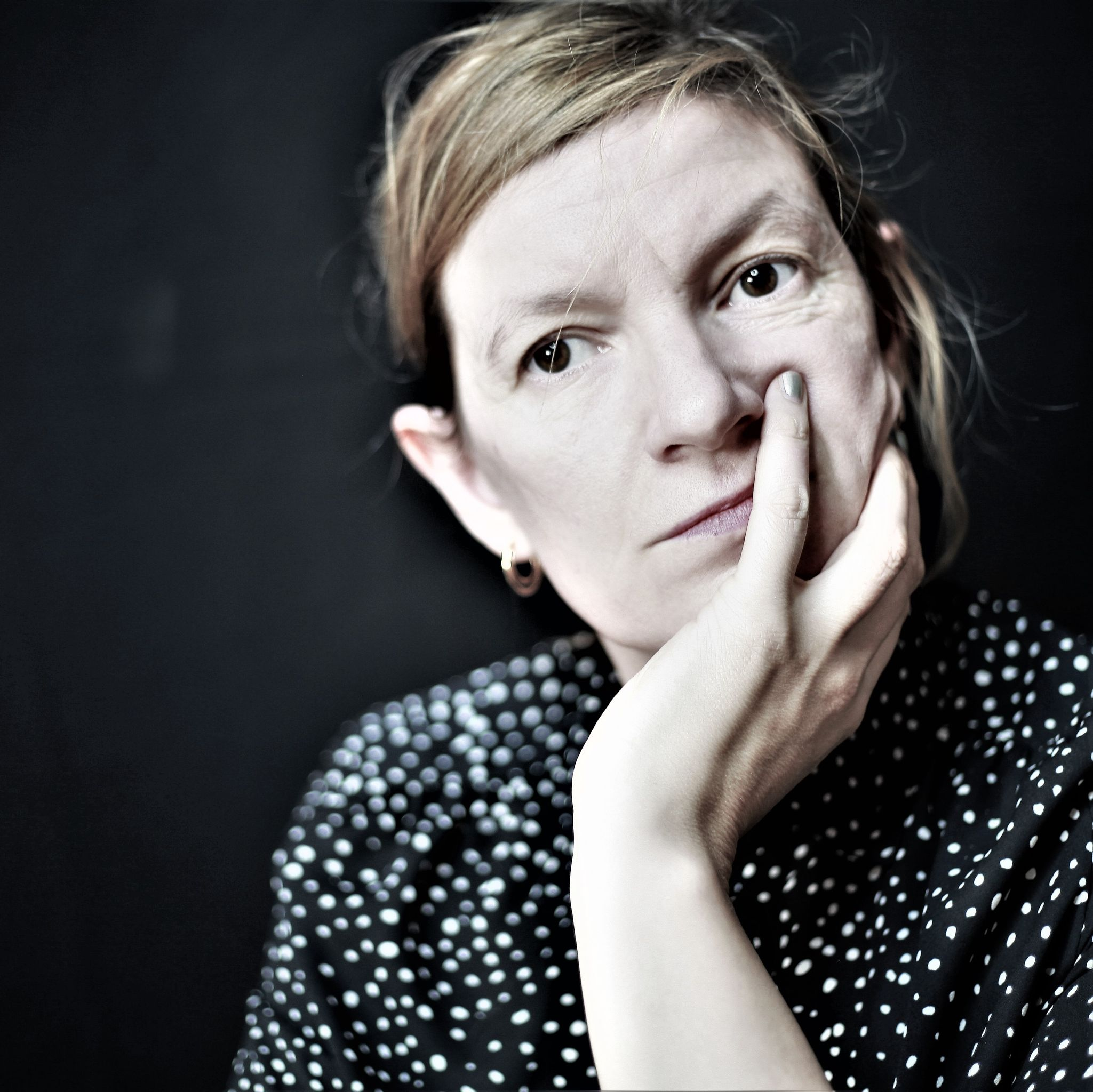
- Carvalho in 2023
- Born: 1977 (age 48–49); Porto, Portugal
- Known for: Comic books; installations; publishing

Isabel Carvalho (born 1977) is a Portuguese artist, writer, editor and printer based in Porto. In 2020 she won the Amadeo de Souza-Cardoso Prize for Portuguese artists.

== Early life and education ==
Carvalho was born in Porto in 1977. She obtained an undergraduate degree in painting from the Faculty of Fine Arts of the University of Porto (FBAUP), a master's degree in printmaking from the Camberwell College of Arts of the University of the Arts London, a master's degree in image design from FBAUP, and a PhD in Cultural and Interartistic Studies from the Faculty of Arts, University of Porto. Initially, she had no idea what she wanted to do. Although enrolled in a painting course, she had no empathy with the prevailing interest in abstract expressionism and spent her time with design students who also produced comics or illustrations. This gave her exposure to printing techniques and led to her Master's course in printmaking.

She first started to get interested in print media when she discovered an anarchist bookstore in Porto where she purchased many fanzines. These were very diverse in content, but she was particularly influenced by those promoting Do it yourself alternative medicine for women, by comics, and by anarchist magazines. In her parents' house, most of the books were religious, together with a few examples of books found in other Portuguese house in the 1980s, such as those on the history of Portugal. These were books that she would make some use of in her work. Later she began to write and draw for print, inspired by comics, which showed her that it made sense to speak from personal experience.

== Career ==
Carvalho's artistic career has been characterised by a strong experimental component, based on research. Her work has developed through close connection between the visual arts, writing, editing and book publishing, which, in more recent years, has expanded to sculpture and the use of three-dimensional space. She was a founding member of the publishing project Braço de Ferro, which covers Art and Design practices. She then rented space on Rua da Alegria in Porto, in which she established Navio Vazio (Empty ship), which was initially intended as a studio but became the starting point for building an experimental publishing laboratory. Visual, textual, and even sound content was arranged on the walls and floor of the studio in order to be converted into printed material. The area was very small and could only accommodate 3 or 4 people at one time. She then edited the magazine Leonorana, in which she explored different editing methods in each issue. She has said that the magazine reflected the principle of cooperation rather than commercialization, which gave her the chance to showcase lesser-known writers.

Carvalho exhibits regularly, both individually and collectively and her work is represented in several public collections. She has undertaken artistic residencies at Bethanien (Berlin), Germany; Hangar (Centre de Producció d'Arts Visuals), Barcelona, Spain and the Maaretta Jaukkuri Foundation, in Lofoten, Norway. In 2021 she was one of 40 artists chosen by the Calouste Gulbenkian Foundation for an exhibition in Lisbon of 20th-century and early 21st-century Portuguese women's art, called All I Want (Tudo O Que Eu Quero).

In 2010, together with Lígia Paz and Pedro Nora, she edited A Economia do Artista (The Economy of the Artist), with contributions from 20 writers who examine the complexity of the relationships between art and economics. She has also written under the name of Clara Batalha, a pseudonym that she chose around 2010, which can be read as a proper name or by its meaning, "bright battle".

== Awards and recognition ==
In 2020 Carvalho received the Amadeo de Souza-Cardoso award from the Museu Municipal Amadeo de Souza-Cardoso (MMASC) in Amarante.

== Exhibitions ==
Carvalho's solo exhibitions have been:

- 2025. Mimológica, Galeria Quadrado Azul, Lisbon; OSSA, Plato, Évora, Portugal.
- 2024. Editoria Errância, Culturgest, Lisbon.
- 2023. CASTING A SOUNDING VOICE, CAAA — Centro para os Assuntos da Arte e da Arquitetura, Guimarães, Portugal; Sistema Coreográfico — a Partir do ZumZum das Vespas Mecânicas Mupi Gallery /Maus Hábitos, Porto, Portugal.
- 2022. Museu Mineiro, Galeria Quadrado Azul, Porto, Portugal; The Grottos Community... new findings, A Gruta, Galeria Quadrado Azul, Lisbon, Portugal.
- 2021. Langages tissés d'Art Contemporain, Le Lait, Albi, Françe.
- 2019. AR(a)C(hné)-EN-CIEL, Galeria Quadrado Azul, Lisbon; Tácita, Segundas na Z, Galeria Zé dos Bois, Lisbon.
- 2018. loja dos espíritos - em cadeia de marcas partidas, moldadas - soma de enunciados - à semelhança das profecias sem fundo, suspensas na película - à tona - combinam-se - para resistirem, por extenso, a serem capturados num só passo!, Spirit Shop, Lisbon; Os ovários das papoilas, Sismógrafo, Porto.
- 2014. Seguir as luzes verdes, Projecto ARTES, Porto.
- 2013. Os cantores dos planaltos fundem linguagens, Kunstlerhaus Bethanien, Berlin, Germany.
- 2012. Orla, Galeria Quadrado Azul, Porto.
- 2008. Biting the hand that feeds you, Galeria Quadrado Azul, Lisbon; Trap, Mad Women in the Attic, Porto; Girls are dreaming about enormous machines, Óbidos, Portugal.
- 2007. A casa é sincera – residência artística comunitária / troca de talentos, Laboratório das artes, Guimarães; Solo, Hangar, Barcelona, Spain.
- 2006. Estação Arqueológica, Museu Martins Sarmento, Galeria SMS, Guimarães; Yes, I’m ; No I’m not, Galeria Quadrado Azul, Porto.
