= Carla Filipe =

Portuguese artist (born 1973)

- Born: 1973 (age 52–53); Aveiro, Portugal
- Occupation: Artist
- Known for: Sculpture, drawing, photography, collage
- Awards: 2023 FLAD drawing prize
- Website: https://carlafilipenotcarlefelipe.com/

Carla Filipe (born 1973) is a Portuguese multidisciplinary artist and photographer, whose work explores the relationship between art objects, popular culture, and activism. She was the winner of the 2023 FLAD (Fundação Luso-Americana para o Desenvolvimento) drawing prize.

== Early life and education ==
Filipe was born in Aveiro in 1973 and brought up in Vila Nova da Barquinha, a small town in the centre of Portugal. She lived in a house built by the state railway company for its staff and was to develop a strong interest in railways. She studied sculpture at the Faculty of Fine Arts of the University of Porto and then obtained a master's degree in contemporary artistic practices from the same university.

== Career ==
Settling in Porto, she began her career by participating in independent artist-run exhibitions. Subsequently, she exhibited in Jafre, Spain (2011); Prague, Czech Republic (2011); Istanbul, Turkey (2013); Berlin, Germany (2015); Lausanne, Switzerland (2015); Paris, France (2015); Captiva, Florida, US (2016); and São Paulo, Brazil (2016), as well as in Lisbon and Porto in Portugal.

In 2014 Filipe had an artistic residency in Antwerp, Belgium. This resulted in an exhibition of collages, titled Harbour of Antwerp: historical crossovers, which examine the ties between Portugal and the Flanders region over the last five centuries, following the lives of Sephardic Jews who were expelled from Portugal in the late fifteenth century. Many settled in Antwerp and made a significant contribution to the city's cultural and economic development.

She was co-founder of artist-run spaces Salão Olímpico (2003–2005) and Projecto Apêndice (2006), both in Porto. In addition to Antwerp she has undertaken residencies at Acme Studios, London, UK (2009–10); the Robert Rauschenberg Foundation (Captiva, Florida) US, 2015; the Krinzinger Projekte, Vienna, Austria (2017); and Peacock & Warm, Aberdeen, Scotland, UK, (2023).

Filipe's work often merges words and drawings. She also uses artefacts such as silkscreen prints, printed and sewn cloth, banners and flags, posters and leaflets, collages, written notebooks, and railway artifacts. She has said that she was influenced by the political propaganda in Portugal that she witnessed in her early years.

In 2023 the Museu de Arte Contemporânea de Serralves in Porto organized a retrospective exhibition of her work, called In my own language I am Independente. Also in 2023 she won the €20,000 FLAD drawing prize, for what the jury considered to be her "truly expansive practice that can be considered a landmark in contemporary drawing in Portugal". From September 2024 to the end of that year her work was exhibited at a new cultural space at the railway station in Mirandela, Portugal, as part of the Serralves Collection Touring Exhibitions Programme. Designed specifically for display at that location, the exhibition combined both her works of art and her interest in the subject of railways, also exhibiting historical artifacts from the station's collection. The exhibition was closely related to travel and her own itinerant nature, as reflected in the title, Com a casa às costas (With the house on your back).

== Selected solo shows ==
"Expurgar Papel", Galeria da Escola das Artes, Universidade Católica, Porto, Portugal, 2024; "The Lizard (Sardão): The New Aberdeen Bestiary", The Worm, Aberdeen, Scotland, UK, 2023; "In my own language I am independente" (anthology), Museu de Serralves, Porto, Portugal, 2023; "Confissões de uma baptizada", Centro de Artes do Arquipélago, S. Miguel, Azores, Portugal, 2022; "hóspede"( Guest), Galerie Carré, Villa de Arson, Nice, France, 2022; "Amanhã não há arte" Maat, Lisbon, Portugal, 2019; "da cauda à cabeça", Coleção Berardo, Lisbon, Portugal, 2014; "Deaf and Dumb archive", Tranzit.display, Prague, Czechia, 2011; "Precarious, Escape, Fascination", Kunsthalle Lissabon, Lisbon, Portugal, 2010.

== Selected group shows ==
"O fantasma da liberdade", Anozero´04 Coimbra Biennial, Portugal, 2024; "Echoes of the Brother Countries", HKW, Berlim, Germany, 2024; "Materialismo histórico", La Oficina, Madrid, Spain, 2023; "FARSA. Linguagem, fratura, ficção: Brasil e Portugal", SECS Pompeia, S. Paulo, Brazil, 2022; "Tudo o que eu quero: artistas portuguesas de 1900 a 2020", Centre de Création Contemporaine Olivier Debré, Tours, France, 2022 / Museu Calouste Gulbenkian, Lisbon, Portugal, 2021; "Insistir em lo mesmo: Volver uma presencia sugerida", EACC, Castellón, Spain, 2029; "New Literacy", 4th Ural Industrial Biennial, Ekaterinburg and cities of Uralregion, Russian, 2017; "Incerteza Viva" 32º Bienal de S. Paulo, Brazil, 2016; "La Réplica Infiel", CA2M, Madrid, Spain, 2016; "Pigs", Artium (Vitoria-Gasteiz) and Galeria Municipal do Porto, Spain and Portugal, 2016; Re-Discover III, Autocenter, Berlin, Germany, 2015; "The lynx knows no boundaries", D´Entreprise Ricard Foundation, Paris, France, 2015; "Mom, am i barbarian?" 13th Istambul Biennial, Turkey, 2013; "1813: assedio, incendio y reconstrucción de Donostia", Museo San Telmo, San Sebastián, Spain, 2013; "Art Situations: una mirada prospectiva" a selection by Teresa Blanch, María de Corral, Yolanda Romero and Vicente Todolí, Arts Santa Mónica, Barcelona, Spain, 2012; "Les Praires", Les Ateliers Biennale d´arte contemporain de Rennes, France, 2012; " Gravity & Disgrace" CGAC, Santiago de Compostela, Spain, 2012; " The Future", V Biennial de Jafre, Spain, 2011; "Region de Múrcia In dialogue with Nothen Africa", Manifesta 8- the European biennial of contemporary art, Murcia and Cartagena, Spain, 2011.

== Publication ==
In 2022, Filipe published Há Gente Na Via (There are people on the track), the first volume of her photographs of Portuguese railways, shot between 2005 and 2022.
