= Helena Almeida =

Portuguese photographer and artist (1934–2018)

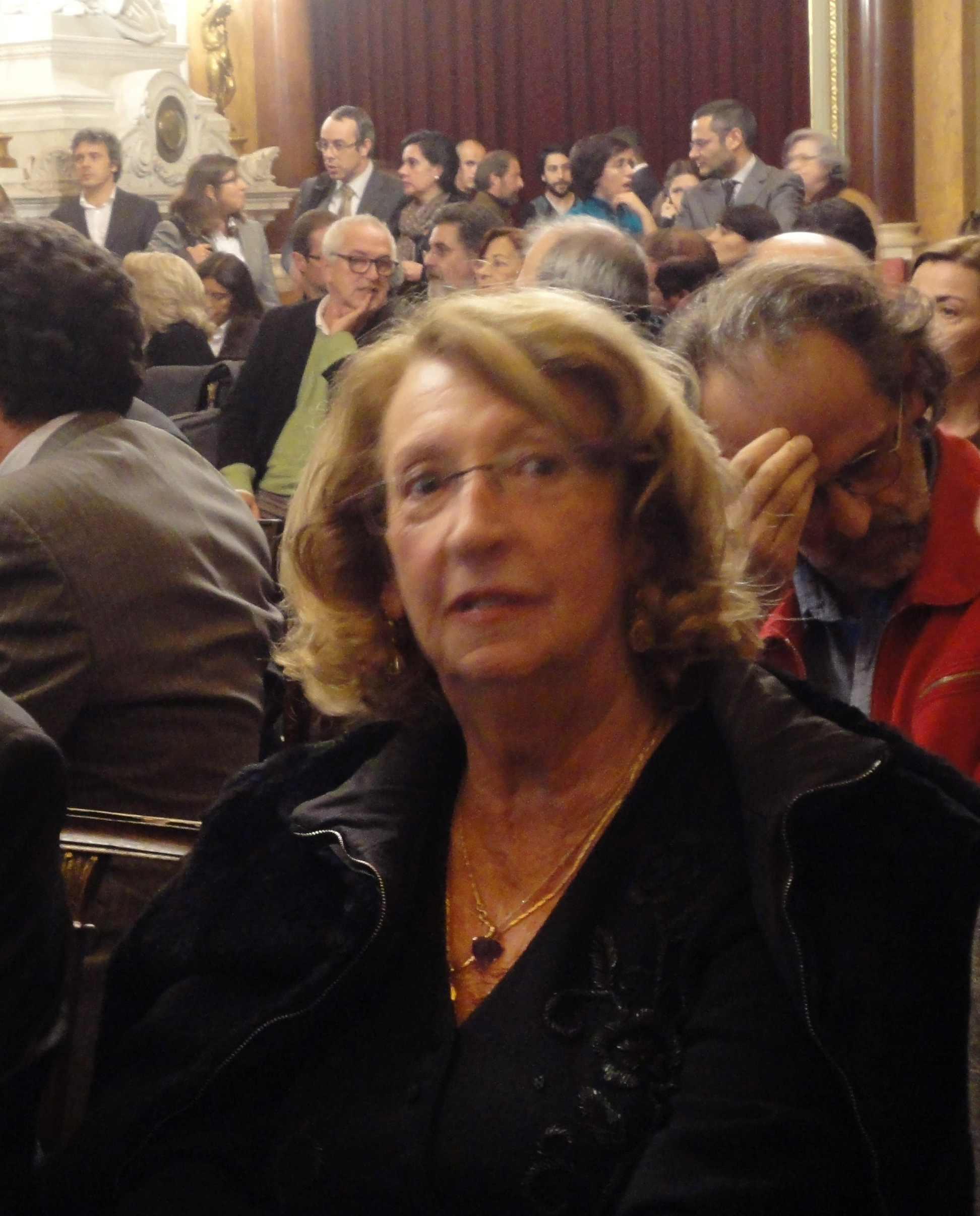
Helena Almeida in 2012

Helena Almeida GOIH (11 April 1934 – 25 September 2018) was a Portuguese artist known for her work in photography, performance art, body art, painting and drawing.

She represented Portugal at the Venice Biennale in 1982 and 2005 and had a solo exhibition at the Art Institute of Chicago in 2017.

== Early life ==
Almeida was born in Lisbon in 1934. She was the daughter of the sculptor Leopoldo de Almeida (1898–1975). In 1955, Almeida completed the painting course at the Lisbon School of Fine Arts. She married architect Artur Rosa. Their daughter Joana Rosa also became an artist. After spending some years raising her family, in 1964 she obtained a scholarship and moved to Paris.

== Works ==
Almeida exhibited for the first time in 1967. At this exhibit she pioneered the use of three-dimensional elements in her work, a theme she would come back to often in her later pieces. She wanted her work to escape the canvas and intrigue the viewer.

Starting in 1969, Almeida defined a new aspect of her work, the desire for self-representation, in an exhibit which became the basis of her future work. She exhibited a black and white photograph of herself wearing a canvas, arms spread and looking down – as in Christ carrying the cross. This photograph asserted her belief in "identifying herself with the being of her work." This became an ongoing theme in her work: there is no difference between the work and artist's body. In her work, a woman's image is always present, but the image is transformed in a painting or drawing. Almeida avoided creating self-portraits. Rather, "My work is my body, my body is my work." "I am the canvas." Her work has been described as "halfway between a performance (capturing an instant), and body art (the body itself as the absolute protagonist).

In the early 1970s Almeida returned to three dimensional sketching, with drawings that use horsehair threads and appear to jump off the page. She referred to this work as "painting outwards."

In 1975, Almeida brought together three disciplines, photography, painting and drawing. The drawing was represented by the horsehair threads; painting in three colors – blue or red sometimes black; photography serves as a meta-narrative. The broad range of her work and experimentation includes "design to cinema, from paintings to comics, from photography to sculpture, from architecture to performance." Almeida's work is shown in the Tate Modern in London, the Museum of Art in New York, the Museu d'art Contemporary de Barcelona, and also in her home town in Lisbon.

== Death ==
Almeida died at her home in Sintra, Lisbon on 25 September 2018 at the age of 84.

== Exhibitions ==
- Galeria Buchholz, Lisbon (1967)
- Alternativa Zero: Tendencias Polémicas na arte portuguesa contemporânea [transl. 'Alternative Zero: Controversial Trends in Contemporary Portuguese Art'], Lisbon, Portugal, 1977
- Venice Biennial (1982)
- Centro Galego de Arte Contemporanea, Santiago de Compostela (2000)
- Sydney Biennial (2004)
- The Drawing Centre, New York (2004)
- Venice Biennial (2005)
- Fundación Telefónica, Madrid (2009)
- Helena Almeida: Inside Me, Kettles Yard, Cambridge, UK (2009)
- Helena Almeida: My Work is My Body, My Body is My Work, Serralves Museum, Porto, Portugal (2015/2016)
- Work Is Never Finished, Art Institute of Chicago, Chicago, IL (2017).
- Helena Almeida, Inhabited Canvas, Tate Modern, London, 2018
