= Ângela Ferreira =

Portuguese and South African artist

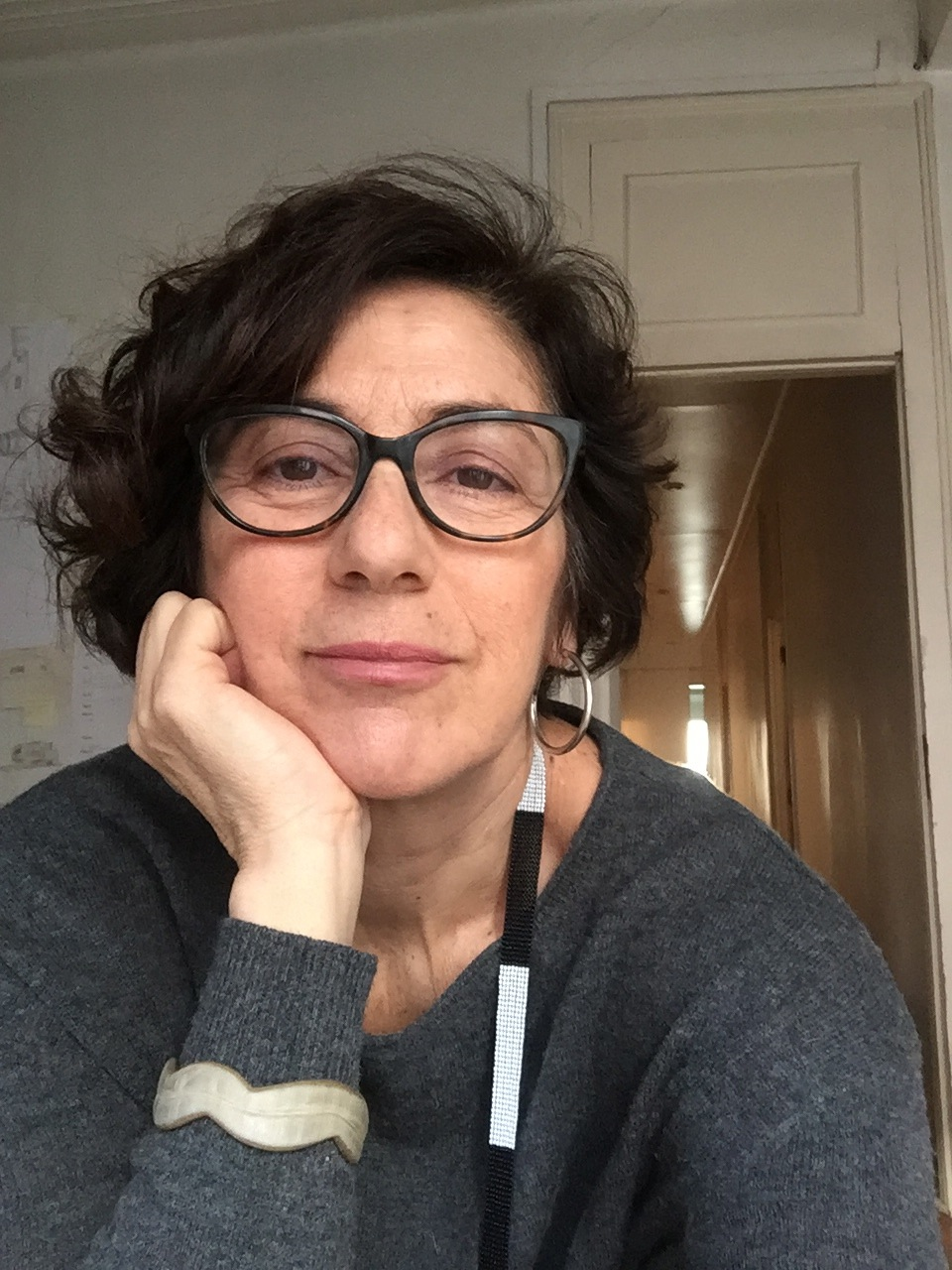
- Born: 1958 (age 67–68); Maputo, Mozambique
- Known for: Installation art
- Website: http://angelaferreira.info

Ângela Ferreira (born 1958) is a Portuguese and South African installation artist, video artist, photographer and sculptor. She spends time in both countries.

== Early life and education ==
Ângela Ferreira was born in Maputo, formerly Lourenço Marques, in Portuguese Mozambique in 1958 and lived and studied in Cape Town during the apartheid era. She graduated in sculpture and also obtained a master's degree in fine arts (MFA) from the Michaelis School of Fine Art of the University of Cape Town. She obtained a PhD from the Faculty of Fine Arts, University of Lisbon in 2016.

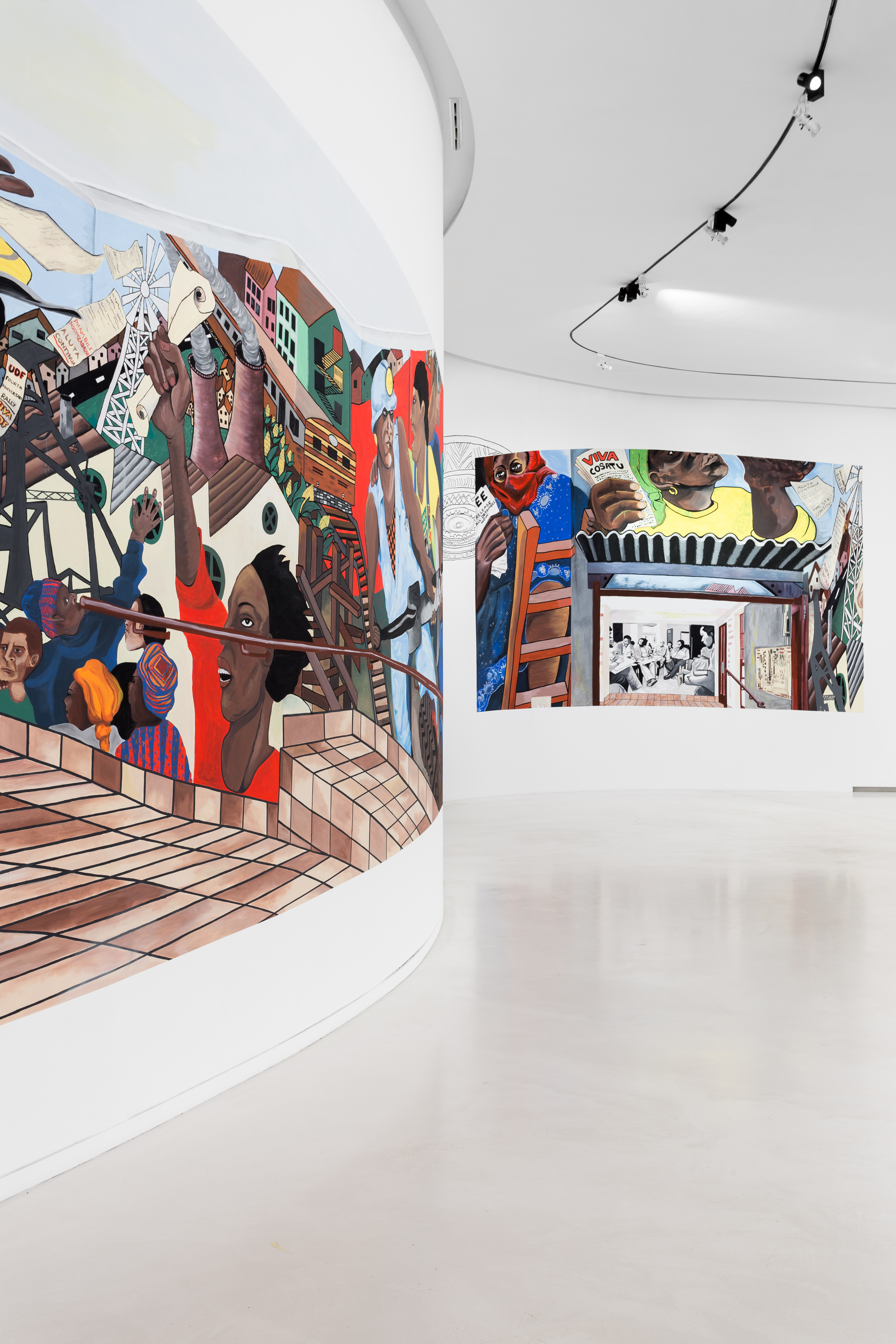
Ângela Ferreira, Pan African Unity Mural – Detail from an exhibition at MAAT, Lisbon - 2018. Acrylic paint on wall.

== Career ==
Between 1983 and 2003, Ferreira lectured in sculpture in several universities in South Africa. Since 2003, she has been an assistant professor at the Faculty of Fine Arts of Lisbon University. Her creative work has been largely focused on exploring intercultural and identity relations between the West and Africa, reflecting the consequences of colonialism and post-colonialism in contemporary society. She was the first Portuguese artist to choose the country's colonial past as a theme. In 1989 and 1990 she held a scholarship from the Calouste Gulbenkian Foundation, and served as a guest artist at the Centro de Arte & Comunicação Visual in Lisbon.

In 1995 Ferreira took part in the Biennale at Caldas da Rainha, winning the sculpture prize. Between 1996 and 1997 she undertook a project at the Chinati Foundation, a contemporary art museum in Marfa, Texas, which had been established by the artist, Donald Judd. She created an installation that evoked the South African folk artist Helen Martins. In 1998 she exhibited at the Kanimambo Multicultural Exhibition in Lisbon, as part of the 1998 Lisbon World Exposition. In 2003 she was an honorary research associate at the Michaelis School of Fine Art. In 2007, Ferreira represented Portugal at the 52nd Venice Biennale. Her project consisted of photographic documentation and a sculpture made from her investigation of three Tropical Houses by French architect Jean Prouvé (1901-1984), which were built in the cities of Niamey in Niger and Brazzaville in the Republic of Congo between 1949 and 1951 and removed in 2001. Ferreira also contributed to Biennials in Istanbul (1999), São Paulo (2008) and Bucharest (2010) and has exhibited widely in Portugal, as well as in Finland, France, Mexico, South Africa and the US. Among her public installations have been contributions to the Frieze Sculpture Park in London in 2008, and exhibitions in Graz, Austria and Lubumbashi, Democratic Republic of Congo.

In 2014 Ferreira held a solo exhibition, Indépendance Cha Cha, at the Lumiar Cité gallery in Lisbon. This exhibition was a continuation of the project that she developed for the Lubumbashi Biennale, taking inspiration from the colonial architecture of downtown Lubumbashi and juxtaposing her work with two videos: one considering forced labour in the mines in that area; the other showing an interpretation of Indépendance Cha Cha, a song by Joseph Kabasele, which became an anthem of the independence movements in francophone Africa in the 1960s. For this work, Ferreira was awarded the Novo Banco Photo Award in 2015. In 2015, she presented a solo exhibition at the Centre for Art and Architecture Affairs in Guimarães, Portugal, which brought together works produced between 2008 and 2012. In 2018 Ferreira was an honorary research fellow at the University of the Witwatersrand in South Africa. Most recently, her work was part of an exhibition of Portuguese female artists at the Calouste Gulbenkian Museum, entitled Tudo o que eu quero (All that I want), which was part of the cultural programme of the Portuguese Presidency of the Council of the European Union.

Ferreira's work can be found in several public collections, including those of the Museum of Art, Architecture and Technology (MAAT), Lisbon; the EDP Foundation, Lisbon; the Calouste Gulbenkian Foundation; the Serralves Foundation, Porto; the Galicia Contemporary Art Centre (CGAC), in Santiago de Compostela; the Market Gallery Foundation, Johannesburg; and the Iziko South African National Gallery, Cape Town.
