= Salette Tavares =

Portuguese poet (1922–1994)

- Born: 31 March 1922; Maputo, Mozambique
- Died: 30 May 1994 (aged 72)
- Education: University of Lisbon
- Writing career
- Genre: Visual poetry

Maria de La Salette Arraiano Tavares (1922–1988) was a Portuguese writer, poet and essayist, best known for her visual poetry.

== Early life and education ==
Salette Tavares was born on 31 March 1922 in Lourenço Marques (now Maputo) in Portuguese Mozambique. At the age of 11 her family returned to Portugal and lived in Sintra in the Lisbon District. This displacement would become an integral part of the imagery in her writing. In 1946 she studied Spanish with the philologist, Manuel Alvar. She then studied historical-philosophical sciences at the University of Lisbon, graduating in 1948 with a thesis entitled Aproximação do pensamento concreto de Gabriel Marcel (Approaching Gabriel Marcel's concrete thinking). Her thesis was published in the same year. In 1949, she attended several courses in Paris. From 1950, she taught at a high school and also took lessons in pottery.

== Career ==
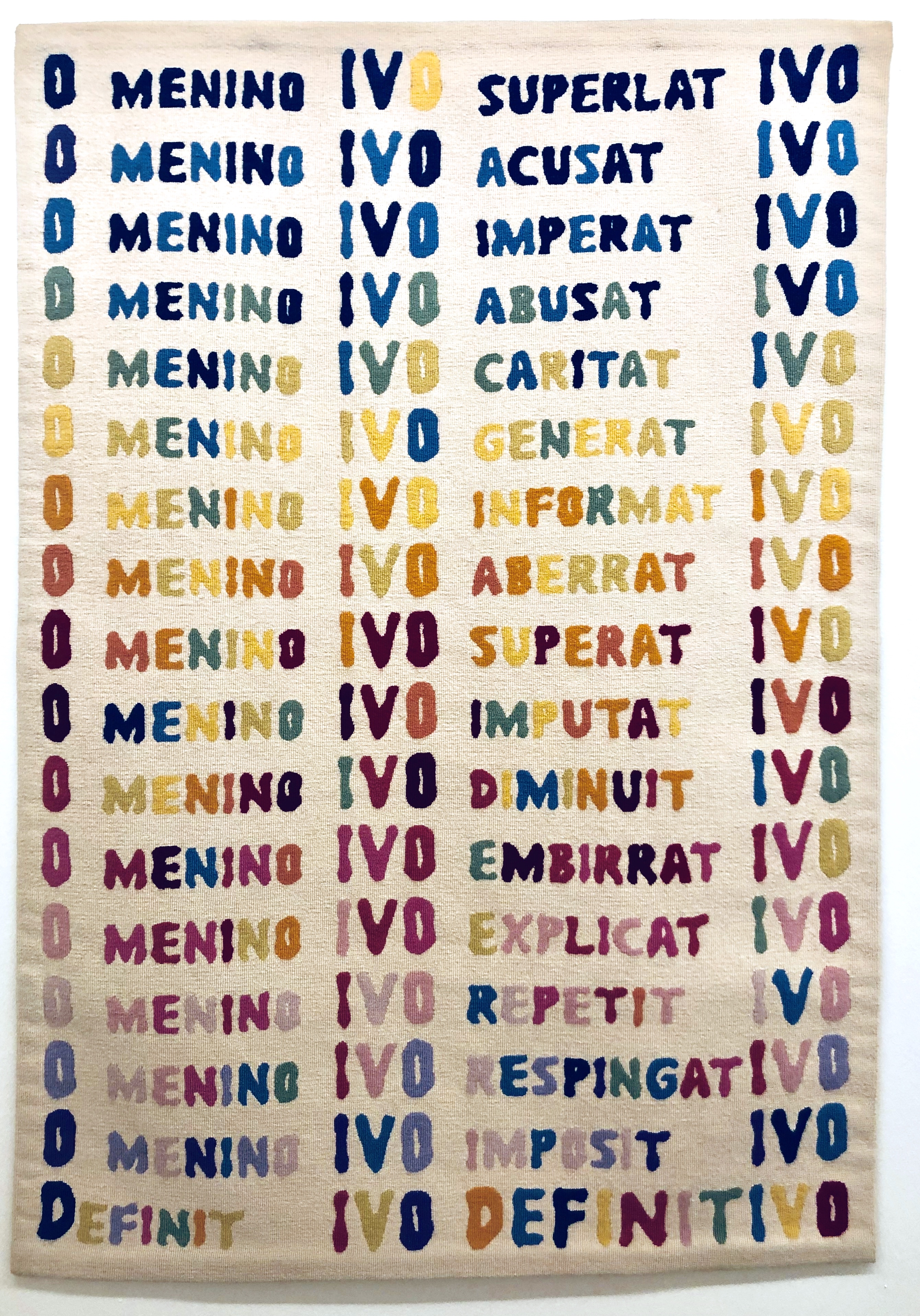
O Menino Ivo by Tavares, 1978

Tavares translated Pensées by Blaise Pascal and Les merveilles du cinema by Georges Sadoul. She then obtained a scholarship from the Calouste Gulbenkian Foundation to study aesthetics in France and Italy, where she worked with Mikel Dufrenne, Étienne Souriau e Gillo Dorfles.

Having published in several magazines from the 1940s, in 1957, Tavares published her first book of experimental poetry, called Espelho cego (Blind mirror). In 1964, she paid a visit to New York City, Chicago and Philadelphia where she visited several museums in the company of her friend, the poet Frank O'Hara, and studied modern architecture with the architect Philip Johnson, also meeting Frank Lloyd Wright and Mies van der Rohe. In 1965 she taught aesthetics at the Sociedade Nacional de Belas Artes in Lisbon, and published the corresponding lessons, without illustrations, in the magazine Brotéria. Her reflections on aesthetics are said to have influenced the emergence of Gestalt psychology.

== Exhibitions ==
Tavares specialised in visual poetry, a form of concrete poetry in which the typographical effect is more important in conveying meaning than is verbal significance. Her work has been exhibited in:

- 1979 – Retrospective of her visual poetry at Galeria Quadrum in Lisbon.
- 2010 – Exhibition Desalinho das Linhas at the Belém Cultural Center.
- 2013 – Exhibition Portuguese Experimental Poetry in Serralves, in Ovar
- 2014 – Exhibition at the Modern Art Centre of the Calouste Gulbenkian Museum in Lisbon.
- 2021 – Exhibition of the work of 40 Portuguese female artists, called Tudo O Que Eu Quero (All that I want), at the Calouste Gulbenkian Museum, which was part of the cultural programme of the Portuguese Presidency of the Council of the European Union in that year.

== Selected works ==
Publications by Tavares include:

- 1957. Espelho cego (Blind mirror). Lisbon, editora Ática
- 1965. 14 563 letras de Pedro Sete (14,563 lyrics by Pedro Sete). Lisbon, Livraria Fomento de Cultura
- 1971. Lex icon. Lisbon, editora Moraes, (with a preface by Gillo Dorfles)
- 1979. Brincar, Brin Cadeiras, Brincade Iras. Lisbon, editora Quadrum
- 1992. Obra poética (1957–1971). Lisbon, Imprensa Nacional-Casa da Moedacom, (with an introduction by Luciana Stegagno Picchio)
- 1995. Poesia Gráfica (Graphic poetry). Lisbon, Casa Fernando Pessoa
- 2014. Poesia Espacial (Spatial poetry). Lisbon, Calouste Gulbenkian Foundation, ISBN 978-972-635-292-1

== Awards and honours ==
In 1992, her entire poetic production was published in Obra Poética, 1957–1971, which won her the PEN Prize, one of the most prestigious literary awards in Portugal.

== Death ==
Tavares died in Lisbon on 30 May 1994.
