= Museum of Modern Art of Bahia =

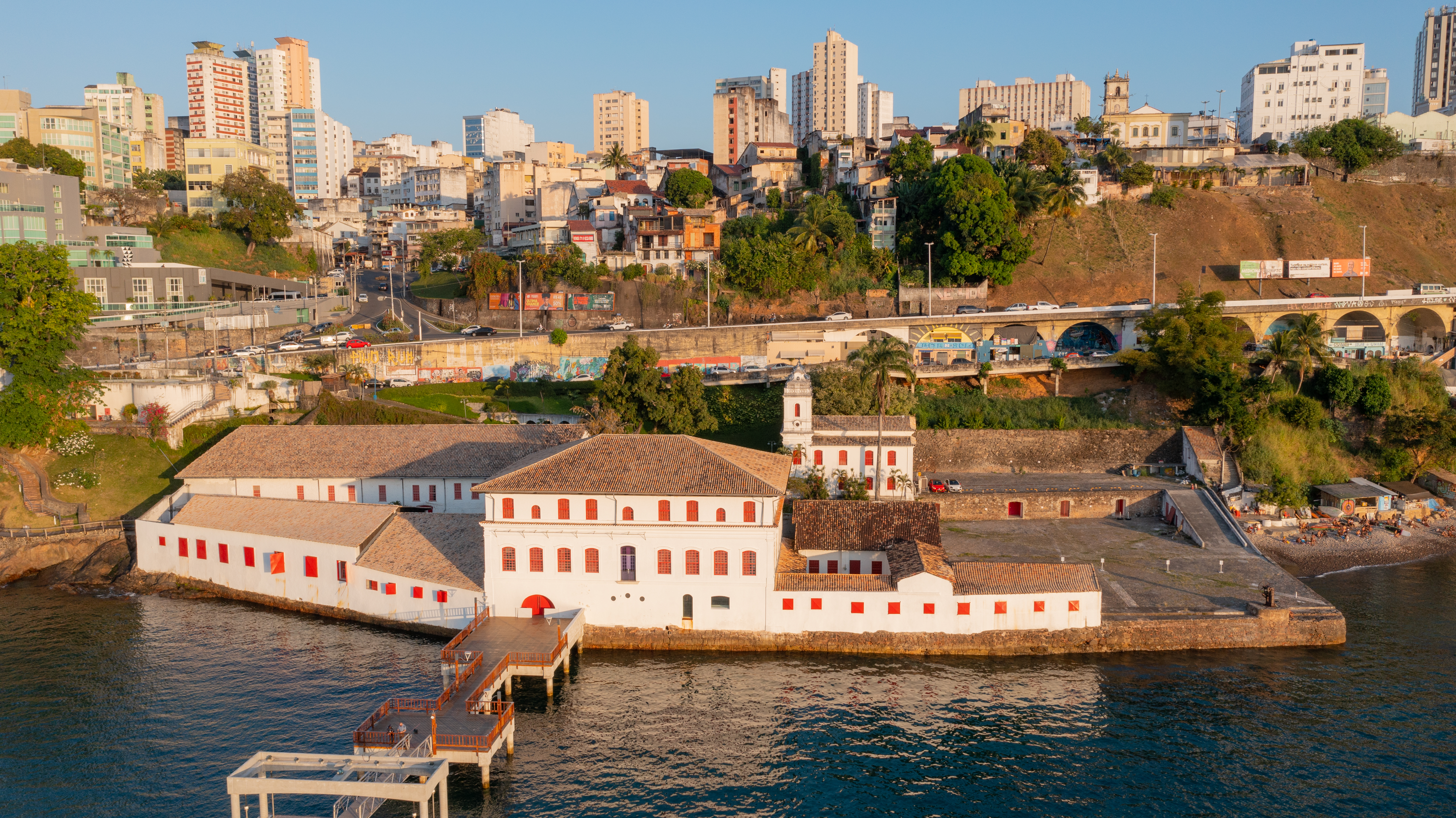
- Established: 1960; 66 years ago
- Location: Avenida do Contorno, Salvador, Bahia, Brazil
- Coordinates: 12.9826°S 38.5206°W
- Type: Art museum
- Director: Tereco Costa Lino
- Architect: Lina Bo Bardi
- Website: www.arte-sur.org/museums/museu-de-arte-moderno-da-bahia/

The Museum of Modern Art of Bahia (Museu de Arte Moderna da Bahia, MAM-BA) is a modern art museum located in Salvador, Bahia, Brazil. It is located within Solar do Unhão, a historical site dating to the 16th century, on the margin of the Bay of All Saints. The museum was founded in 1960 under the architect Lina Bo Bardi (1914-1992) and initially located in the foyer of the Castro Alves Theater; it moved to its present location in 1963. MAM-BA is one of twelve state museums linked to the Institute of Artistic and Cultural Heritage (IPAC), an authority of the Department of Culture of the State of Bahia.

The collection of MAM-BA is noted for paintings, sculptures, photographs, and drawings by artists such as Tarsila do Amaral, Portinari, Flávio de Carvalho, Di Cavalcanti, Rubem Valentim, Pancetti, Carybé, Mário Cravo Neto, and Sante Scaldaferri. MAM-BA has eight exhibition rooms; a theater; a library; a technical space to house conservation, restoration, and museology; and an art workshop that offers open courses of painting, engraving techniques, ceramics, drawing, handmade paper, and sculpture to the community.
