= Menez (painter) =

Portuguese artist (1926–1995)

- Born: Maria Inês da Silva Carmona Ribeiro da Fonseca; 6 September 1926; Lisbon, Portugal
- Died: April 11, 1995; Lisbon
- Known for: Painting
- Awards: Prémio Pessoa (1990)

Menez or Maria Inês Ribeiro da Fonseca, GOSE (9 September 1926, in Lisbon – 11 April 1995) was a Portuguese painter. Her major body of work consists of paintings and drawings but she also produced ceramics, engravings, silk-screen prints and tapestries.

== Early life ==
Maria Inês Ribeiro da Fonseca was born in Lisbon on 9 September 1926. The maternal granddaughter of former Portuguese president General Óscar Carmona and his wife Maria do Carmo Ferreira da Silva Carmona, Menez had a cosmopolitan childhood, having lived in Buenos Aires, Stockholm, Paris, Switzerland, Rome, following her father's diplomatic appointments, and in Washington, D.C., with her husband. She returned to Portugal in 1951.

== Artistic career ==
Menez never attended art school. She only started painting regularly at the age of 26, as a self-taught artist. Her first exhibition was at Galeria de Março, Lisbon in 1954. Subsequently, she exhibited infrequently, with her time taken up by bringing up her children and the tragedy of the early deaths of the two eldest, in 1976 and 1977. She exhibited individually at Galeria Pórtico (1958); Diário de Notícias Gallery, Lisbon (1959, 61, 63); Galeria Divulgação, Lisbon (1964); Gallery 111, Lisbon (1966, 81, 85, 87, 90, 94); SNBA, Lisbon (1966); Judite Dacruz Gallery, Lisbon (1972); Quadrum Gallery, Lisbon (1977); Portuguese Cultural Centre, Paris (1977); Zen Gallery, Porto (1981, 83, 89); and Gilde Gallery, Guimarães (1988).

In 1960 Menez received a scholarship from the Calouste Gulbenkian Foundation to work in Portugal and, later, a further scholarship to work in London (1965–1969). Her work is said to reveal the influence of the School of Paris. In the 1980s she followed the paradigm shift that led to the return of figurative painting in the 1980s, settling into a style to which she would remain faithful until the end. In 1990, the Calouste Gulbenkian Museum's Centre for Modern Art presented a retrospective exhibition of her work. After her death, she continues to be widely exhibited, most recently in 2022 at the Casa das Histórias Paula Rego in Cascais, Portugal.

== Personal life ==
Menez married Rui Burnay Morales de Los Rios da Silva Leitão, with whom she had two sons and a daughter before divorcing.

== Awards ==
In 1990 Menez was awarded the Pessoa Prize. In 1995, she was posthumously made Grand Officer of the Military Order of Saint James of the Sword.

== Death ==
Menez died in Lisbon on 11 April 1995.
