= Maria José Aguiar (artist) =

Portuguese artist (born 1948)

- Born: Maria José Marinho de Aguiar; 1948; Barcelos, Portugal
- Known for: Painting

Maria José Aguiar (born 1948) is a Portuguese artist. Her work is marked by the use of feminist themes related to sex and gender issues.

== Early life and education ==
Maria José Marinho de Aguiar was born in Barcelos in the Braga District of Portugal. After completing the painting course at the Escola Superior de Belas Artes do Porto (School of Fine Arts of Porto - ESBAP) in 1972, she began to exhibit, obtaining some early media recognition. In 1973, she began to teach at ESBAP, becoming the first women to teach painting there.

== Artistic career ==
Influenced by Pop art, Aguiar held her first solo exhibition in 1973, at Galeria Alvarez in Porto. Sex became a constant theme in her work, even before the 1974 Carnation Revolution that overthrew the Estado Novo dictatorship and ended censorship. In 1974 she exhibited at Galeria Espaço and in 1977 at Galeria Módulo, both in Porto. From 1981, she began to give acknowledgement of the work of other artists, namely in the pieces she called "camouflages". She created a controversial series of works entitled Marcas, which addressed gender issues and the power relations inscribed in biological bodies. It is possible to see a series of non-erotic phalluses, which are disconnected from the bearers and lacking uniqueness, forming a decorative pattern.

== Work ==
Aguiar's work has appeared in major thematic exhibitions, most recently in a 2021 exhibition of Portuguese female artists at the Calouste Gulbenkian Museum, entitled Tudo o que eu quero (All that I want), which was part of the cultural programme of the Portuguese Presidency of the Council of the European Union. Her art is held by various important Portuguese collections, including that of the Calouste Gulbenkian Foundation, the Caixa Geral de Depósitos bank, the Soares dos Reis National Museum in Porto and the Secretary of State for Culture.
