= PLMJ Law Firm =

Portuguese law firm

PLMJ
- Headquarters: Avenida Fontes Pereira de Melo, 43, Lisbon, Portugal
- No. of offices: 9
- No. of lawyers: 280
- Major practice areas: Business and Finance
- Date founded: 1967 (Lisbon, Portugal)
- Website: www.plmj.com

PLMJ is a Portuguese law firm with its headquarters in Lisbon. It is a full-service, multidisciplinary firm that advises Portuguese and multinational financial and state institutions on a range of domestic and international transactions.

PLMJ is a member of World Services Group and World Law Group, two international multidisciplinary professional services networks of independent accounting and law firms.

== History ==
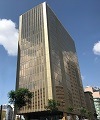
PLMJ headquarters in Lisbon, Portugal.

The firm PLMJ was founded in Lisbon in 1967, with the association between partners António Maria Pereira and Luís Sáragga Leal and, in the next decade, they were joined by new partners Francisco de Oliveira Martins and José Miguel Júdice.

In 1998, PLMJ moved to its current headquarters in Avenida da Liberdade, in the centre of Lisbon, at a time when it already had more than 100 lawyers. The new century marked the beginning of PLMJ's national expansion with the opening of offices in Faro in the Algarve in 2000 and two years later in the northern city of Oporto.

== Awards and Rankings ==
PLMJ was named Law Firm of the Year in Portugal by the Chambers Europe Awards for Excellence 2014, an award it also won in 2012 and 2009. In 2014, it was named as one of 50 Law Firm Innovators in Continental Europe by the Financial Times. The firm was also named Iberian Law Firm of the Year in 2012 and 2015 by the British magazine The Lawyer.

Many PLMJ lawyers are recognised by the leading international directories including Chambers and Partners Europe and Global, Legal 500, IFLR 1000, and Best Lawyers.

== PLMJ Foundation ==
The PLMJ Foundation is a non-profit institution that is a patron of the visual arts in Portugal and other Portuguese-speaking countries. The Foundation had its beginnings in the late 1990s. The firm began a collection of paintings, drawings and sculpture, which was later broadened to include photography and video. Under the motto “A law firm as a space for culture”, this collection became the PLMJ Foundation at the beginning of 2000.

The PLMJ Foundation was declared to be an institution of higher cultural interest by the Portuguese Minister of Culture and plays an important role in promoting visual arts in Portugal and in African countries where Portuguese is the official language. The PLMJ Foundation also focuses on supporting young artists and is already one of the major players on the Portuguese cultural scene.

The Foundation's objective is to raise the profile of visual arts in Portugal by making regular acquisitions to build a collection that illustrates modern artistic output in the country. Its collections host artworks by well-known artists alongside the work of those at the beginning of their careers.

The PLMJ Foundation also acts as a publisher and an exhibition organiser with a focus on young artists from all visual arts areas. The foundation has hosted the Opções & Futuros (Options & Futures) project since 2005.
