= Centro de Arte Moderna Gulbenkian =

Art museum in Lisbon, Portugal

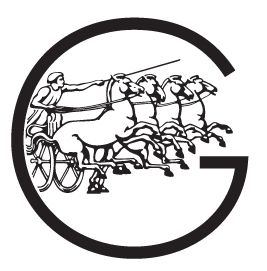

- Location within Lisbon
- Former name: Centro de Arte Moderna José de Azeredo Perdigão
- Established: 1983
- Location: Gulbenkian Foundation, Lisbon, Portugal
- Coordinates: 38.7359°N 9.1536°W
- Type: art museum, contemporary art museum
- Director: Benjamin Weil
- Website: https://gulbenkian.pt/cam/en/

The Centro de Arte Moderna Gulbenkian (CAM) is a major venue for contemporary art in Portugal and holds one of the largest collections of modern and contemporary Portuguese artworks. Its building is currently under renovation and will reopen to the public, with a reformulated building, by Kengo Kuma, to celebrate its 40th anniversary in 2023 (pushed backed to 21st September 2024). The CAM continues to develop its activities beyond the limits of the building until its reopening.

== Gallery ==
Curved engawa canopy designed by Kengo Kuma

Timber underside and supports of the engawa canopy

Stepped roofline of the garden-facing facade

Garden-facing facade and reflecting pool
