= Museum of Art, Architecture and Technology =

Museum in Lisbon, Portugal

- Museu de Arte, Arquitetura e Tecnologia

- The new MAAT building, designed by architect Amanda Levete, as seen from the river.
- Established: 4 October 2016 (Placing the last stone: 9 March 2017)
- Location: Belém, Lisbon, Portugal
- Coordinates: 38.69591°N 9.19464°W
- Type: Museum of art, science and industrial archeology and exhibition center
- Director: João Pinharanda
- Architect: Amanda Levete
- Owner: EDP Foundation
- Website: www.maat.pt

The Museum of Art, Architecture and Technology or MAAT (Portuguese: Museu de Arte, Arquitetura e Tecnologia) (MAAT) is a museum in Lisbon, Portugal.

== The Museum ==
MAAT is a cultural project for the city Lisbon that is focused on three areas - Art, Architecture, and Technology. The €20m museum sits on the River Tagus (Rio Tejo) to the west of the city centre. and "one of Europe's most lyrical new museums". It establishes a connection between the new building and the Tejo Power Station, one of Portugal's most prominent examples of industrial architecture from the first half of the 20th century, and one of the most visited museums in the country. The museum is designed by Amanda Levete Architects.

MAAT's ambition is to present national and international exhibitions by contemporary artists, architects, and thinkers. The programme also includes various curatorial perspectives on EDP Foundation's Art Collection, reflecting current subject matters and trends.

MAAT's programme opened on 30 June 2016 with four exhibitions held in renovated spaces of the Tejo Power Station building. On 5 October of the same year, the new building opened to the public with a large-scale work by French artist Dominique Gonzalez-Foerster, created specifically for this space.

The museum hosted the Eurovision's "Blue Carpet" event, where all the contestants and their delegations are presented before the press, fans and public, on 6 May 2018. The official Opening Ceremony of the 2018 contest, which will take place at the nearby Electricity Museum.

On 19 December, 2019 part of the false ceiling in the entrance of the building collapsed as a result of storm Elsa.

== Gallery ==
View towards the west

View towards the east

View from the café of the 25 de Abril Bridge

Rooftop view towards the 25 de Abril Bridge

Pedestrian footbridge

Museu da Electricidade (Central Tejo), with the modern MAAT building on the right

Interior of the Museu da Electricidade (Central Tejo)
