= Josefa Garcia Greno =

Spanish–Portuguese artist (1850–1902)

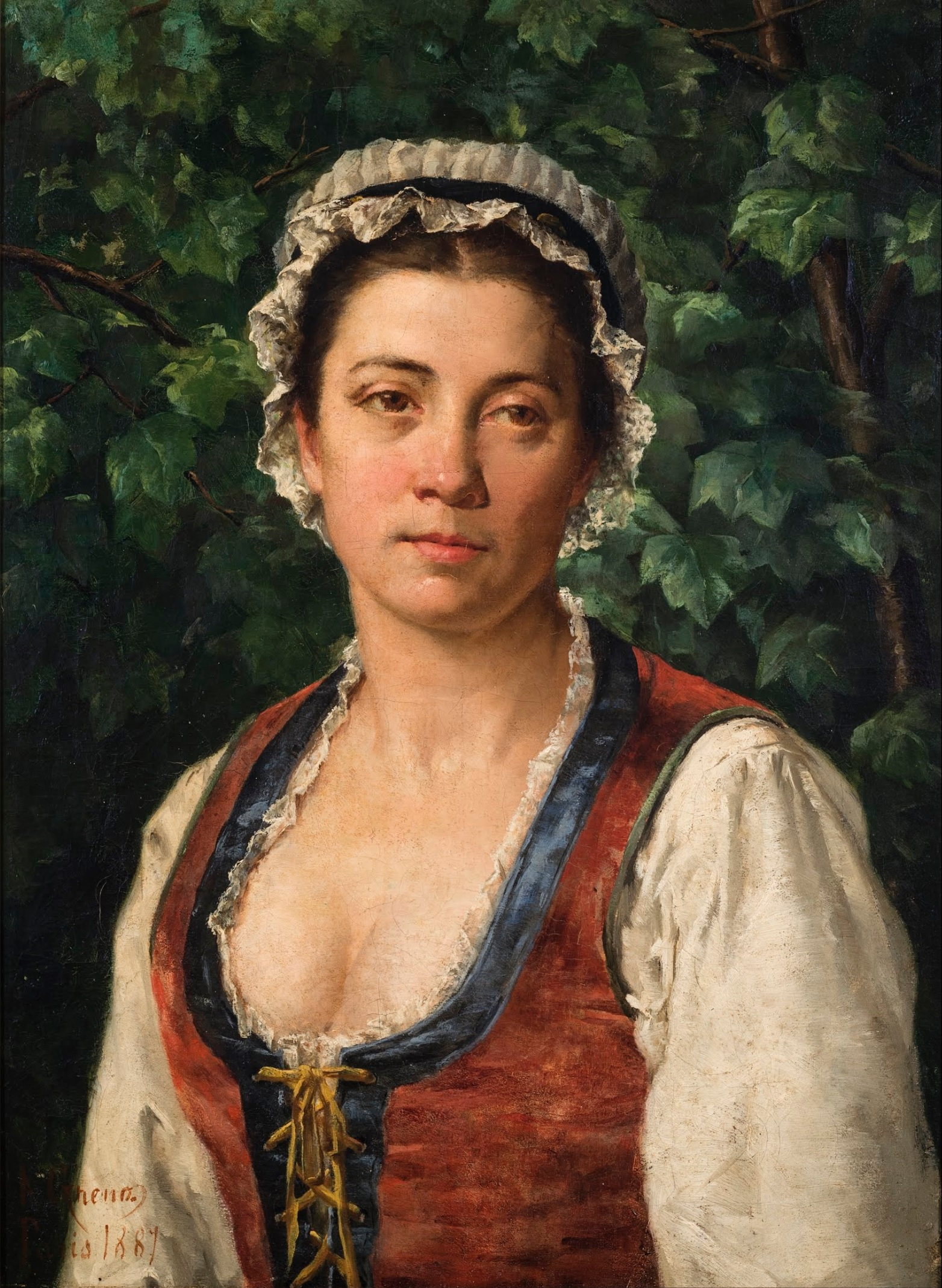
- Portrait of Greno by her husband
- Born: Maria Josefa Garcia Seone; 1 September 1850; Medina-Sidonia, Andalusia, Spain
- Died: 27 February 1902 (aged 51); Lisbon, Portugal
- Known for: Painting
- Movement: Romanticism

Maria Josefa Garcia Seone Greno (1850–1902), better known as Josefa Garcia Greno, was a Portuguese-Spanish naturalist painter who was part of the Group of the Lion artists' group.

== Early Years ==
Greno was born in the Santa Maria area of Medina-Sidonia in Andalusia in Spain on 1 September 1850. Her father, Captain-General José Garcia Saéz, died when she was four and she and her mother, Maria Seone, went to live in A Coruña in Galicia, where they remained for six years before returning to Andalusia. In Seville, she learned to read, write, embroider, and draw, eventually writing and publishing short stories and poems. However, the intense political instability in Spain led her family to choose to settle in Lisbon, capital of neighbouring Portugal. There, she turned to haute couture and embroidery as a means of supporting herself and her mother.

== Marriage and Life in Paris ==
At the age of 20, she met the painter Adolfo César de Medeiros Greno, who was studying painting at the Lisbon School of Fine Arts under the Portuguese Romantic painter, Miguel Ângelo Lupi. They married on 18 September 1876, in Lisbon. That year, the couple moved to Paris with her mother, so that her husband could continue his academic studies. During this period, she was one of the main models for her husband's paintings, and she also began to learn to paint.

Her husband benefited from a scholarship in Paris, where he was taught by Alexandre Cabanel. However, after neglecting his studies and work and increasingly frequenting the city's bohemian nightlife, he lost his financial support in 1881. Seeing that the family could not depend on her husband for support, Greno devoted herself to painting, focusing on paintings of flowers, such as mimosas, peonies, and marigolds. She was admitted to the Société des Artistes Français, on the basis of a landscape painting she had submitted. While still in Paris she began to associate with the Portuguese painters Columbano Bordalo Pinheiro and Artur Loureiro.

== Return to Portugal, and the Lion Group ==
Returning to Portugal in 1884, Greno participated in the XIII Exhibition of the Society for the Promotion of Fine Arts, where she caught the attention of the event organizers for her technique, especially for the colours she used and the way she worked with light in her canvases. In 1886, she presented several paintings at the Sixth Exhibition of Modern Paintings, organized by the Grupo do Leão (Lion Group) to which she was invited by the painter Silva Porto. She joined the exclusive group of the Lionesses, the name by which the women artists who were part of the movement were known, namely Berta Ortigão, daughter of the writer Ramalho Ortigão, Maria Augusta Bordalo Pinheiro, and Helena Gomes. While primarily exhibiting in Lisbon, she also sent work to exhibitions in Portugal's second city of Porto.

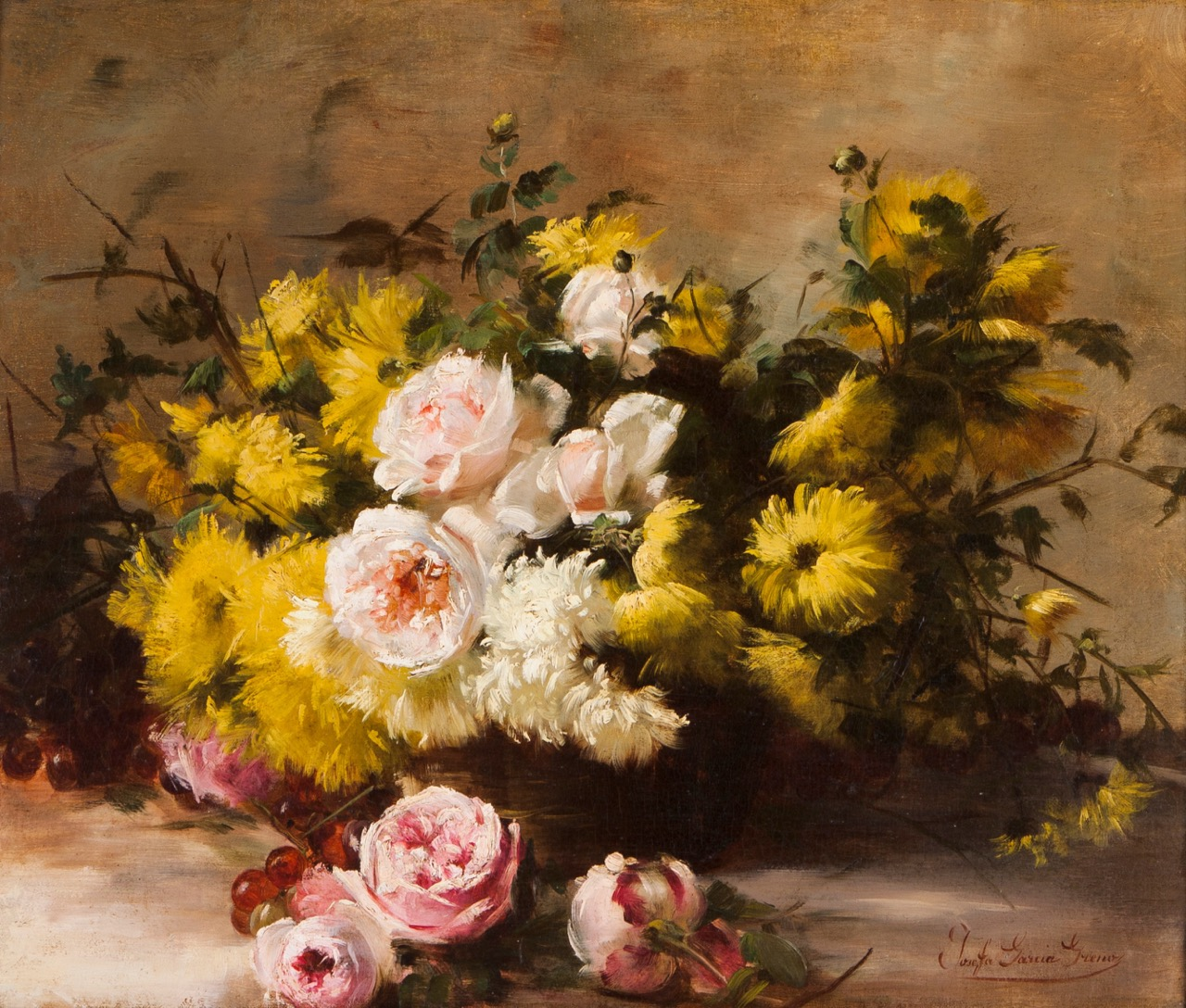
Still life with flowers by Josefa Garcia Greno

Until 1901, she was a constant presence in exhibitions organized by the Grémio Artístico and the newly founded National Society of Fine Arts, frequenting the salons of the Lisbon cultural elite of the time, associating with writers such as Fialho de Almeida and exhibiting alongside artists such as Columbano Bordalo Pinheiro, José Malhoa, Silva Porto, and Fanny Munró. She was also a mentor and painting teacher to several Portuguese artists, including the naturalist painter and bullfighter, Simão Luís da Veiga, and the painter Júlia Hermínia da Conceição Xavier.

== The Greno Case ==
While Greno achieved great professional success, her husband followed the opposite path, spending the family's savings. She had a nervous breakdown in 1895, when her husband misappropriated the savings she had accumulated. Her mother died in 1899, which greatly affected Greno, who never again picked up her brushes. On the night of 7 April 1901, Greno fired a shot at her husband, but missed. On the night of 25 to 26 June of the same year, Greno shot her husband four times while he slept. She was taken to the Cadeia do Aljube prison in Lisbon, but following much public support, including from her husband's brother, was transferred to the Rilhafoles Hospital on 2 July 1901. Miguel Bombarda an acclaimed psychiatrist and director of that hospital, forbade visits, and no one from outside the hospital ever saw her alive again. She was initially diagnosed as suffering from delusion and was declared insane by most newspapers of the time. In addition to her mental decline, she was later diagnosed with Bright's disease.

== Death ==
Greno died on 27 January 1902 at the Rilhafoles Hospital. An autopsy found that her heart was more than double the weight and size of a normal female heart. She was buried at the Alto de São João Cemetery.

== Gallery ==
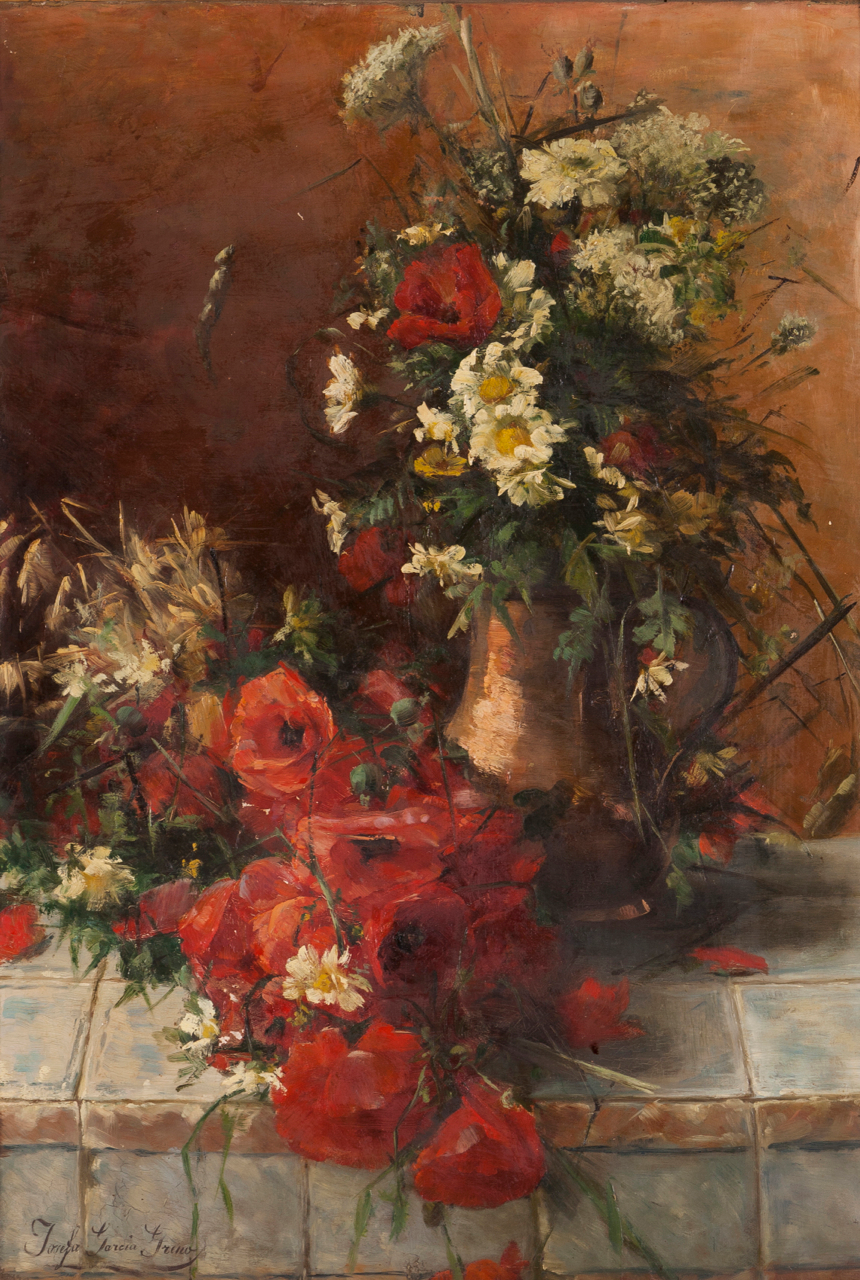
Flowers

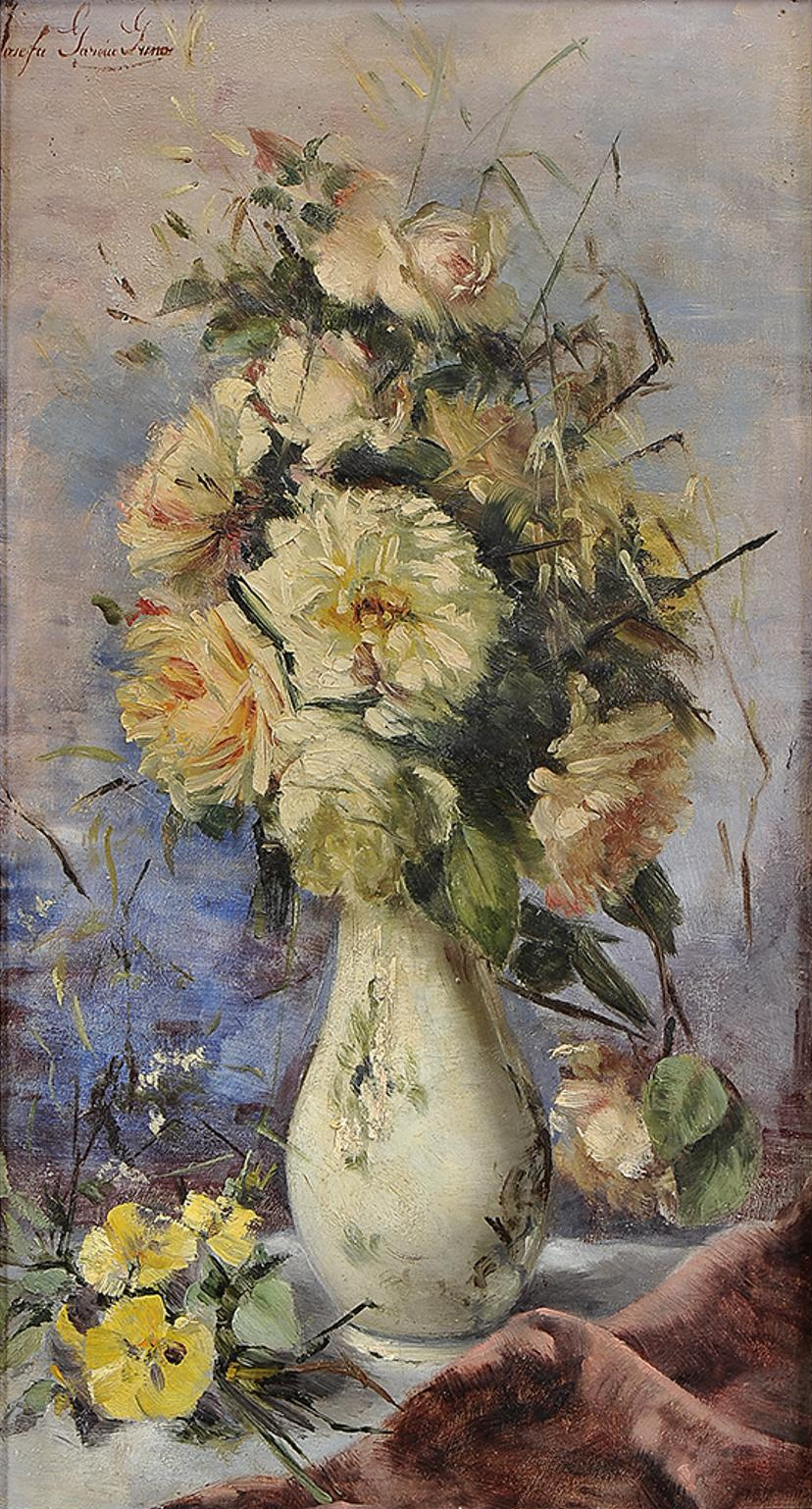
Vase with flores

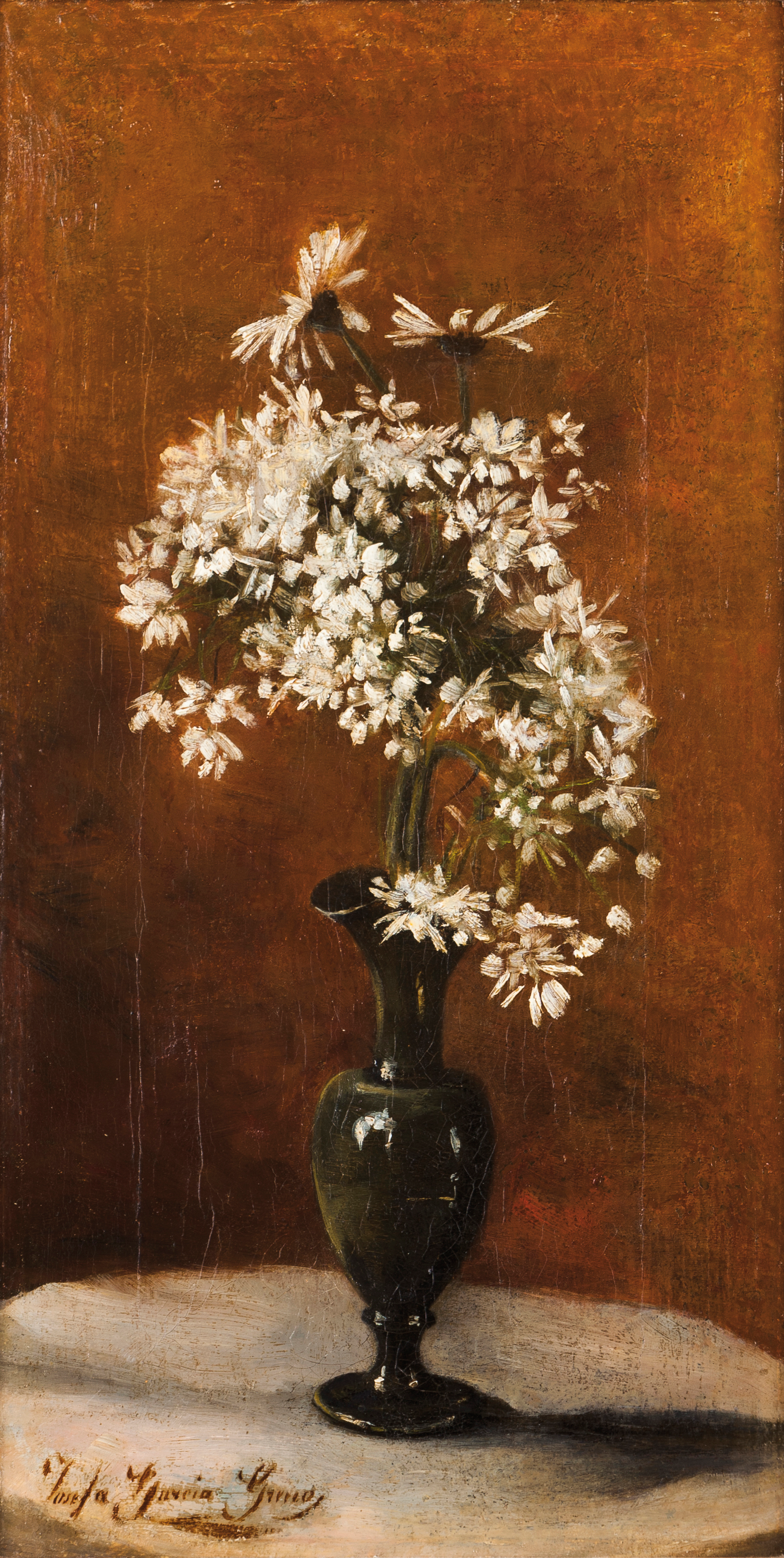
Still life

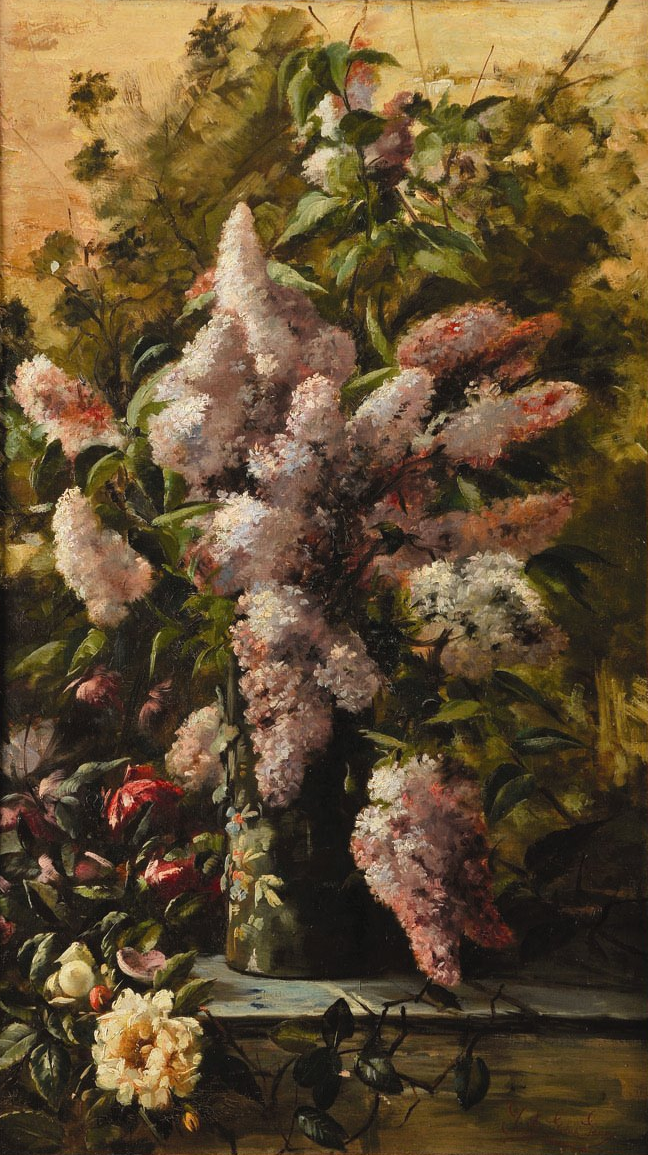
Lilacs

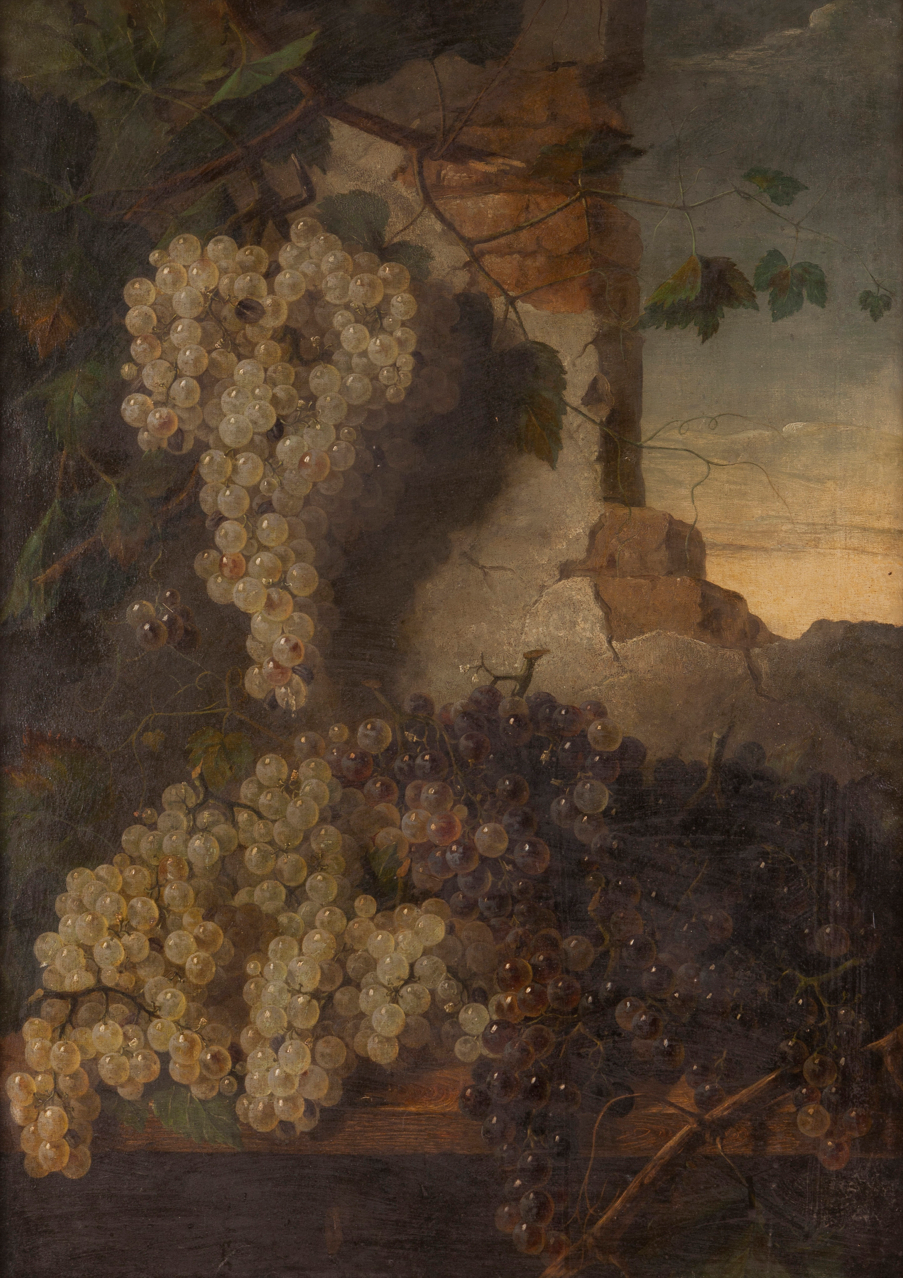
Still life with grapes and ruins

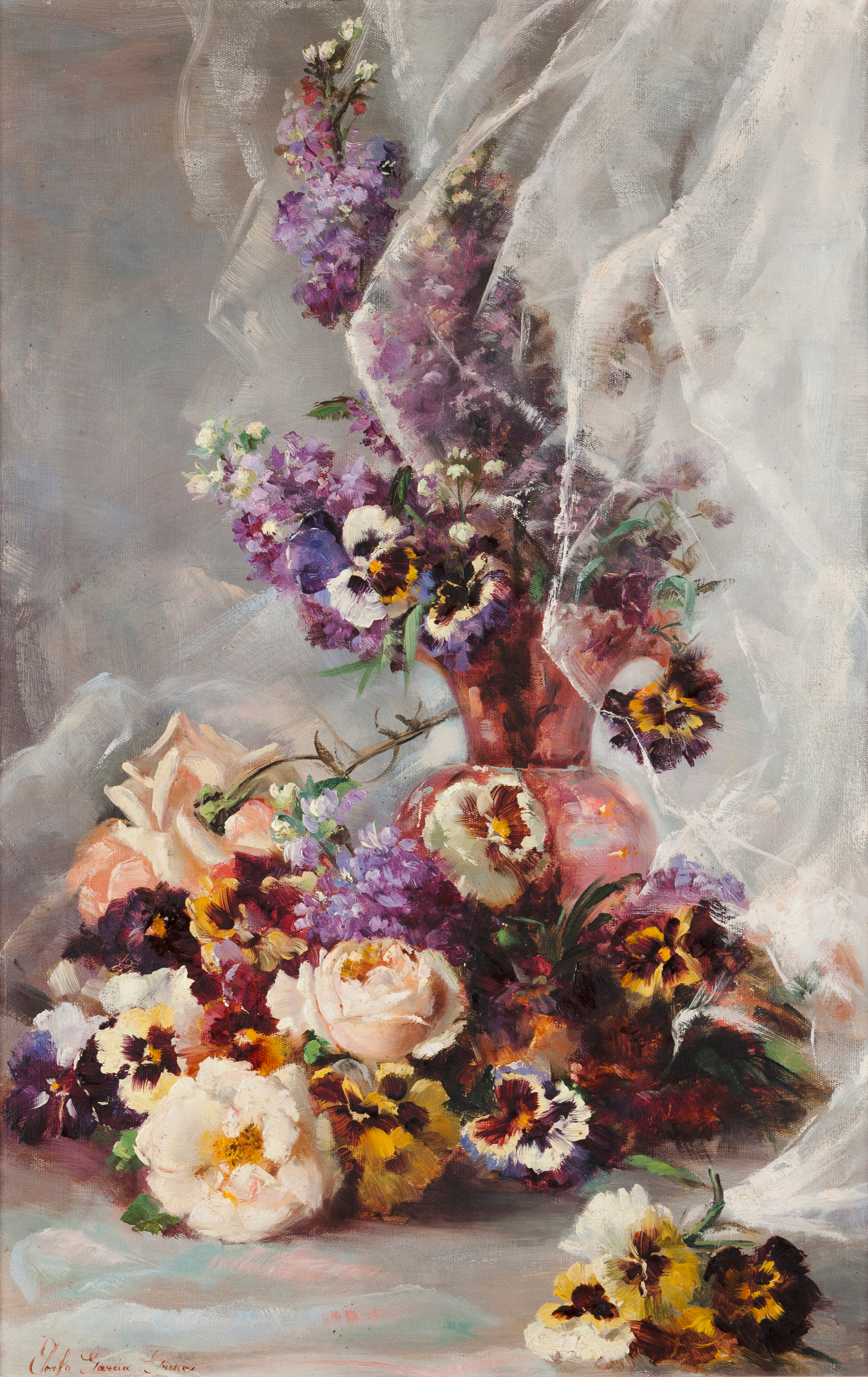
Still life
