= Fanny Munró =

Portuguese painter

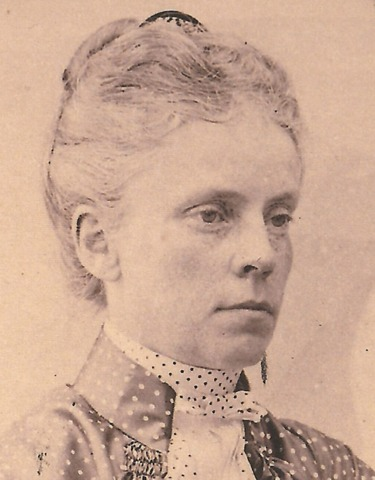
- Born: Francisca Joyce Munró; 10 February 1846; Lisbon, Portugal
- Died: 1926; Lisbon
- Occupation: Artist

Francisca Joyce Munró, better known as Fanny Munró (1846–1926), was a Portuguese painter, of Scottish and Irish descent.

== Early life ==
Munró was born in the Portuguese capital, Lisbon, on 10 February 1846, the daughter of Charles Alexander Munró and Maria José Peters Joyce Munró, both descendants of Scottish and Irish families who had emigrated to Portugal. She was the oldest of the four children of the couple. Contemplative and more introverted than her sisters, Cristina and Alice, Francisca, who was known in the family as Fanny, soon revealed her talent for visual arts, literature and theatre, having participated in plays, recitals and soirees in Lisbon society in the late 19th and early 20th centuries. Her family was from Lisbon's upper class, and Fanny and her sisters were exposed to famous figures from society such as the artists José Malhoa and Columbano Bordalo Pinheiro. The latter painted her in a small picture in 1898.

== Exhibitions ==
Supported by her family, she became a disciple of the painter António da Silva Porto and began exhibiting her work in 1887, when she participated in the XIV Exhibition of the Society for the Promotion of Fine Arts, exhibiting four landscapes and still life paintings. In the following years, she continued to develop her work, exhibiting in various galleries, salons and artistic competitions, such as in the Industrial Exhibition (1888), the Fan Exhibition (1891), in the first four editions of the Exhibition of the National Society of Fine Arts ( 1901–1904) and in at least eight of the first editions of the Grémio Artístico Exhibition (1891-1898), having received honourable mentions in the sixth edition. In 1900, Munró participated in the 1900 Paris Exposition. She received much praise about her work over the years, in articles published in Portuguese periodicals and magazines such as O Ocidente Arte Portugueza and Ilustration Portugueza, as well as in Brazilian magazines.

== Tragedy ==
After the death of her father and the emigration of her brother Carlos to Brazil, Fanny and her sister Cristina moved in with their sister, Alice, who had married Policarpo Pecquet Ferreira dos Anjos, a businessman and philanthropist. In the Anjos' house, Munró created her own studio and, after the death of her boyfriend, began to concentrate on painting seascapes. She had fallen in love with Filipe de Andrade. They exchanged letters almost daily but one day the letters stopped arriving and, after an investigation by her family, it was discovered that Andrade had been found drowned in the Tagus River. Munró briefly withdrew from public life and never married.

Subsequently, Munró again focused on painting, and continued to exhibit, compete and participate in collective and individual exhibitions, such as the Collective Art Exhibition in Porto (1908), VIII Exhibition of the Society of Fine Arts (1910), XI Exhibition of the Society of Fine Arts (1914), the 4th Exhibition of Watercolours, Drawing and Miniatures, (1918) and the 20th Exhibition of the Society of Fine Arts (1923), where she was awarded an honourable mention in the oil painting category.

Munró died in 1926, in Lisbon.

== Legacy ==
During her life, Munró bought and received as gifts several works by Portuguese artists. Many of these she donated to museums, such as the works of Miguel Ângelo Lupi, which are exhibited at the Chiado Museum of Lisbon. Munró's own works are largely in private collections.
