= Grupo do Leão =

Portuguese artistic and cultural group (1881–1889)

The Grupo do Leão (English: Lion's Group) was a tertulia or gathering of Portuguese artists and intellectuals who met at the Leão de Ouro (Golden Lion) tavern in Lisbon between 1881 and 1889. The group included young artists who would become prominent, such as Silva Porto, José Malhoa, and the brothers Rafael and Columbano Bordalo Pinheiro, and was responsible for the dissemination and success of modernist painting in Portugal. In 1885, the Grupo do Leão was immortalized in an oil on canvas of the same name by Columbano Bordalo Pinheiro.

== History ==
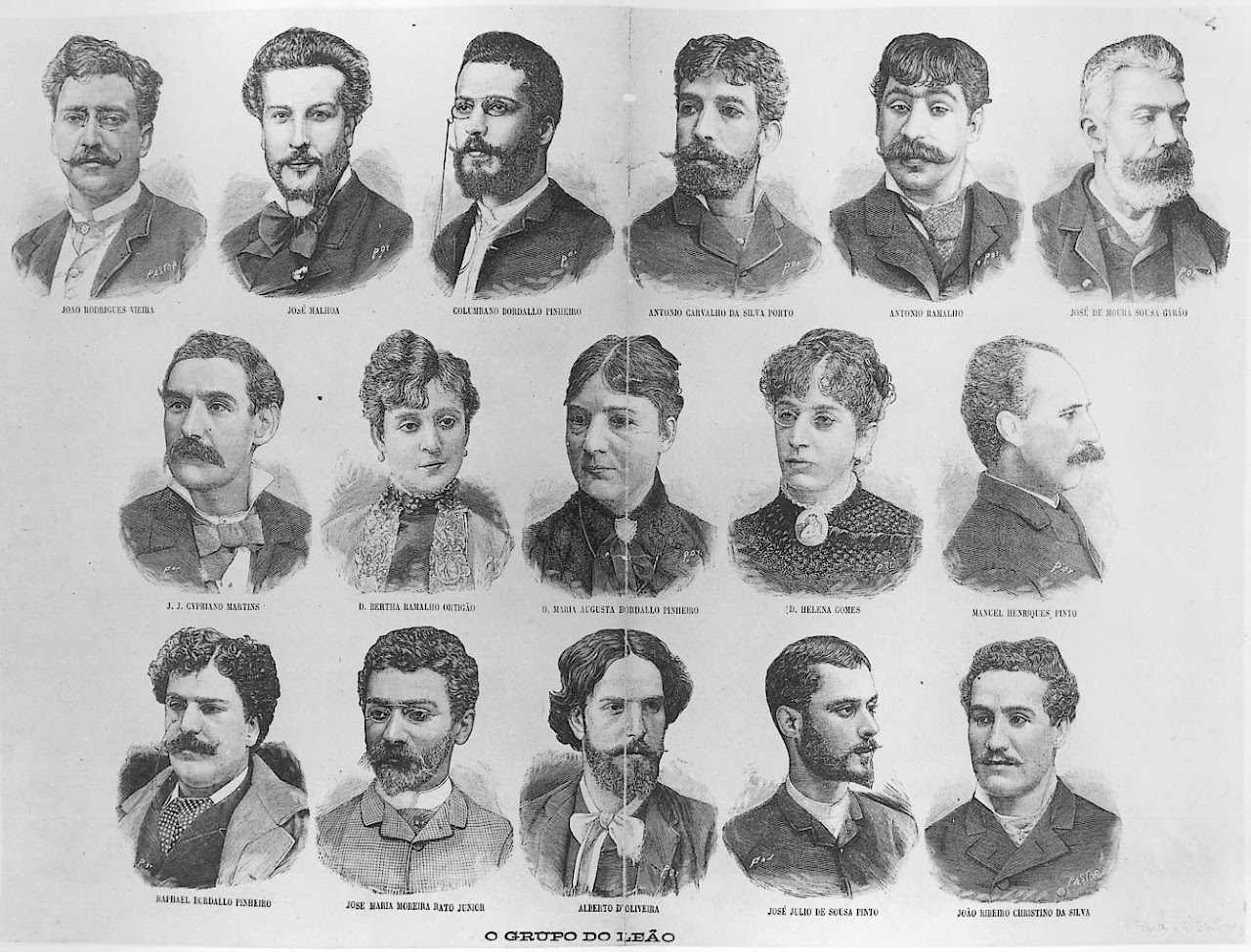
Members of the Group

The Group was first formed by artists and others who met in the attic of Alberto de Oliveira's house in Praça da Alegria in Lisbon. They later met at the Leão de Ouro Brewery at Rua Primeiro de December, from which they got their name after it was used by a journalist in the Diário da Manhã. A restaurant of the same name still exists there. The Group was promoted by the painter Silva Porto who had recently returned from Paris, having been the first recipient of a state scholarship to go to that city, and was a professor at the Lisbon School of Fine Arts. Bringing together intellectual friends, admirers, and disciples, it was responsible for organizing several exhibitions, which contributed to the success of modern painting in Portugal. There were a few women members, who were known as the "Lionesses".

The artists of the group were members of the Society for the Promotion of Fine Arts (SPBA). Dissatisfied with the conservatism of the society, they organized nine exhibitions in Lisbon, of what they first called "modern paintings" and, later, "modern art", when they began to include works of sculpture. The exhibitions were mainly promoted by Alberto de Oliveira and always took place in mid-December. They were very well attended, with King Ferdinand II even acquiring works from the group, which was a guarantee of success. The break with the prevailing artistic scene was evident. Small canvases with everyday themes were executed, paying particular attention to life in the countryside, in scenes full of light and with great freedom of representation.

At the end of 1888 some members of the group launched the idea of an Artistic Guild (Grémio Artístico), which was formalized in 1890. This was a direct continuation of the artists in the Grupo do Leão but much expanded, and organized nine exhibitions during 1891–1899. In 1901, the SPBA and the Grémio Artístico merged, giving rise to the National Society of Fine Arts.

== Painting by Columbano Bordalo Pinheiro ==
In 1885, the group members had proposed to decorate the tavern, which was about to undergo renovations, with the support of the owner, executing paintings specifically for the location, contributing to the popularization both of the new artistic style and of the establishment. Leandro Braga carved a golden lion, José Malhoa, Ribeiro Cristino and Silva Porto created landscape paintings, and Maria Augusta Bordalo Pinheiro embroidered a lion for the tapestry. In all, 27 works by eleven members were installed. However, it was the painting of the Grupo do Leão by Columbano Bordalo Pinheiro, placed at the entrance of the establishment, on the left side, that gained fame and critical acclaim. This set the practice in Lisbon for patrons of bars and clubs to decorate the buildings they frequented, notably at the Café A Brasileira and the Bristol Club.

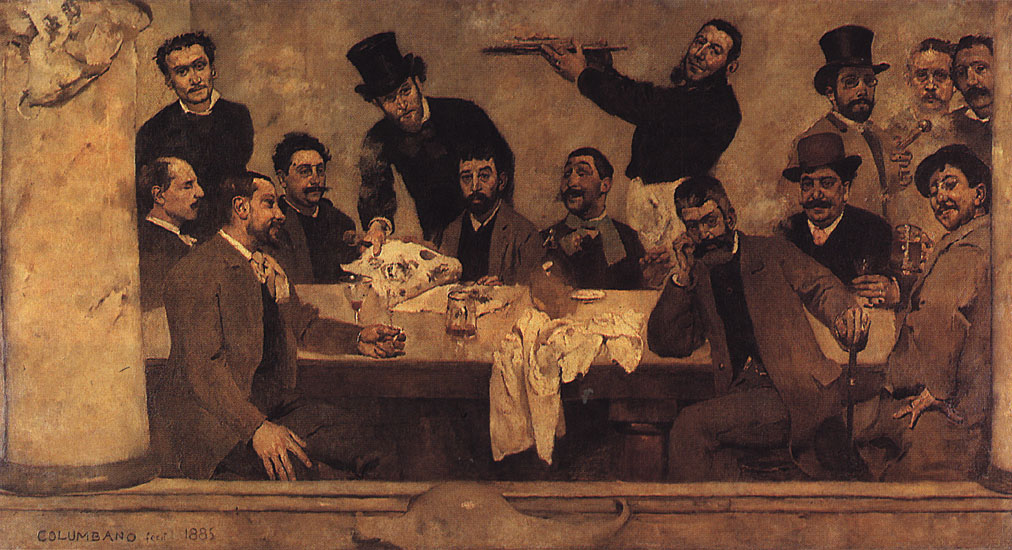
The Lion's Group by Columbano Bordalo Pinheiro

The 1885 painting by Columbano Bordalo Pinheiro, illustrated here, shows: in the rear, from left to right the painter, João Ribeiro Cristino, the intellectual, Alberto de Oliveira, the waiter Manuel Fidalgo, the painter himself, the owner of the tavern, António Monteiro, and the painter, Cipriano Martins. Sitting from left to right are the painter, Henrique Pinto, José Malhoa, the marine painter, João Vaz, Silva Porto, the painter, António Ramalho, the painter Moura Girão, the caricaturist, Rafael Bordalo Pinheiro and the sculptor, José Rodrigues Vieira. The painting remained on display until 1945 before being moved to a museum. It is now in the National Museum of Contemporary Art of Chiado.

The main members were:

- Abel Botelho (1854–1917), writer
- Alberto de Oliveira (1861–1922), writer
- António da Silva Porto (1850–1893), painter
- António Ramalho (1859–1916), painter
- Bulhão Pato (1829–1912), poet
- Cesário Verde (1855–1886), poet
- Cipriano Martins (?-1866), painter and landscaper
- Columbano Bordalo Pinheiro (1857–1929), painter
- Fialho de Almeida (1857–1911), writer
- Henrique Pinto (1853–1912), painter
- João Anastácio Rosa (1812–1884), actor and sculptor
- João Vaz (1859–1931), painter
- João Ribeiro Cristino da Silva (1858–1948), painter
- José Malhoa (1855–1933), painter
- José Rodrigues Vieira (1856–1898), sculptor
- Josefa Garcia Greno (1850–1902), painter
- Leandro Braga (1839–1897), carpenter
- Maria Augusta Bordalo Pinheiro (1841–1915), painter
- Mariano Pina (1860–1899), writer
- Monteiro Ramalho (1862–1949), writer
- Moura Girão (1840–1916), painter
- Rafael Bordalo Pinheiro (1846–1905), caricaturist
