= The Lion's Group (Columbano) =

Painting by Columbano Bordalo Pinheiro

- O Grupo do Leão (Portuguese)
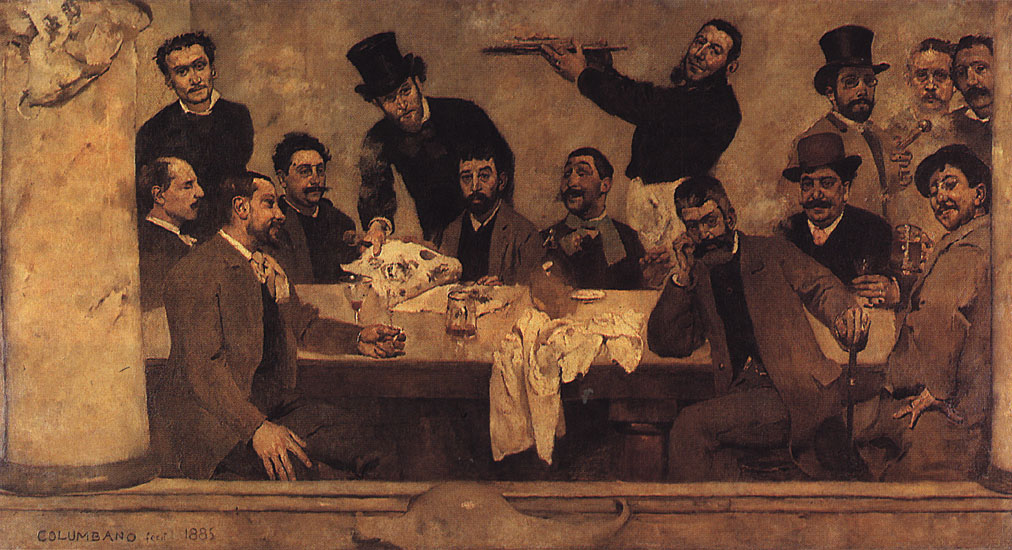
- Artist: Columbano Bordalo Pinheiro
- Year: 1885
- Medium: oil on canvas
- Dimensions: 201 cm × 376 cm (79 in × 148 in)
- Location: National Museum of Contemporary Art of Chiado, Lisbon

The Lion's Group (Portuguese: O Grupo do Leão) is an oil on canvas painting by the Portuguese artist Columbano Bordalo Pinheiro, from 1885. It is held at the National Museum of Contemporary Art of Chiado, in Lisbon.

== History and description ==
The large-scale painting depicts a group of naturalist and realist artists who were members of the artistic group of the same name, and used to attend the Leão de Ouro Brewery (Portuguese: Cervejaria O Leão de Ouro), opened in 1878, located on Rua 1º de Dezembro, in Lisbon. For this reason and for the fact that they used to exhibit their paintings in the brewery's gallery, the group was named The Lion Group. The painting was commissioned to Columbano Bordalo Pinheiro, himself a member of the group. Columbano, most likely, took inspiration from the group portraits of intelectuals that Henri Fantin-Latour had created. He also worked from photographs and individual sketches of the sitters.

The painting shows them at a table in the brewery, a very diverse group, most seated, but some up, chatting or staring at the viewers in a very friendly environment. Columbano can be seen, on top hat, at the left, in a pose probably inspired by Edgar Degas. His older brother, the caricaturist Rafael Bordalo Pinheiro, is seated in front of him. Silva Porto, the unofficial leader of the group, is seated at the left, looking at the viewer, while the writer Alberto de Oliveira is showing one of the French magazines he used to bring to the gatherings of the group. José Malhoa, other great painter, in the left side, is chatting amusingly with fellow artist António Ramalho, seated at the other side of the table. Meanwhile, the waiter Manuel arrives with a platter full of food for the guests.

While the work wasn't made from the natural it neverthless captures the sense of friendship and camaraderie that was present in these regular meetings.

== Reception ==
Portuguese art historian José-Augusto França notices the similarities with the works by Fantin-Latour but believes that Columbano went further: "The paintings by Fantin-Latour are older (...), however they dont go further in his understanding of the scene and the actors. If we compare this work with those by the French painter we easily find here greater liberty of conception and forms".

== Provenance ==
The painting was exhibited in the brewery until 1946. It was acquired for the Portuguese State in 1953, by 400.000$00. Other people showed interest in its acquisition, Brazilian Assis Chateaubriand, the founder of the São Paulo Museum of Art, and the Portuguese banker Artur Cupertino de Miranda.

== See also ==
- Grupo do Leão
