= Luciano Freire =

Portuguese painter and art restorer

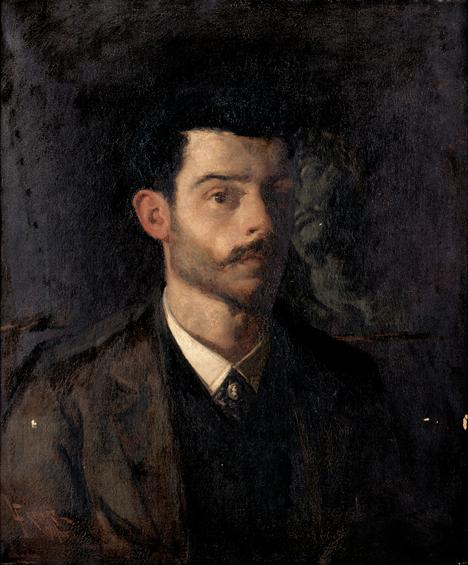
Self-portrait (1895)

Luciano Martins Freire (11 June 1864, Lisbon - 28 January 1934, Lisbon) was a Portuguese painter and art restorer. He specialized in landscapes and genre scenes. Some of his works have Symbolist elements.

== Biography ==
Of humble origins, in 1886 he completed a course in history painting at the Academia Real de Belas-Artes, where his primary instructors were Miguel Ângelo Lupi, Tomás da Anunciação and José Ferreira Chaves. He also learned naturalist landscape painting from, and was heavily influenced by, Antonio da Silva Porto. His first exhibition came in 1887.

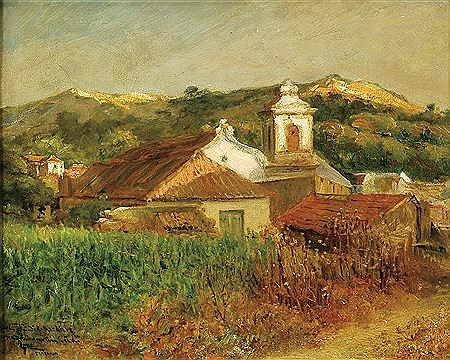
View of Trafaria

He initially focused on painting portraits. His depiction of boatmen ("Catraeiros") earned him a nomination as an "Academic of Merit" in 1895. Ironically, it was lost at sea while being brought back from an exhibition of Portuguese paintings at the Exposition Universelle (1900). This was followed by a series of paintings dealing with industrialization, to which he was opposed. Later, however, he would create a series of drawings depicting the development of the Linha de Cascais; a major railway line from Cascais to Lisbon.

From 1896 to 1933, he held a chair in drawing at the Academia Real. From 1900 to 1910, he served as its Secretary. During his tenure there, he travelled extensively, to France and England, visiting museums and art galleries, to raise awareness of issues involving the preservation of Europe's artistic heritage. He was especially interested in the conservation and restoration of what he termed Portugal's "Primitives".

He was also a member of the Council of Art and Archaeology, a branch of the Ministry of Public Instruction; serving as its President in 1911 and 1932. From 1909 to 1910, he helped restore the Saint Vincent Panels. Together with the art historians and critics, Ramalho Ortigão, José Pessanha (1865-1939) and José de Figueiredo, he organized the "Commission for the Inventory and Improvement of Ancient Painting in Portugal" (1910).

He was a strong supporter of the First Portuguese Republic; participating in the inventories that were taken of the royal palaces, and religious congregations, as part of the separation of church and state. In 1911, he was appointed Director of the National Coach Museum. He also helped organize the National Museum of Ancient Art, and was a regular contributor of articles on art, to various magazines and newspapers; notably Terra Portuguesa and the Revista de Arqueologia.

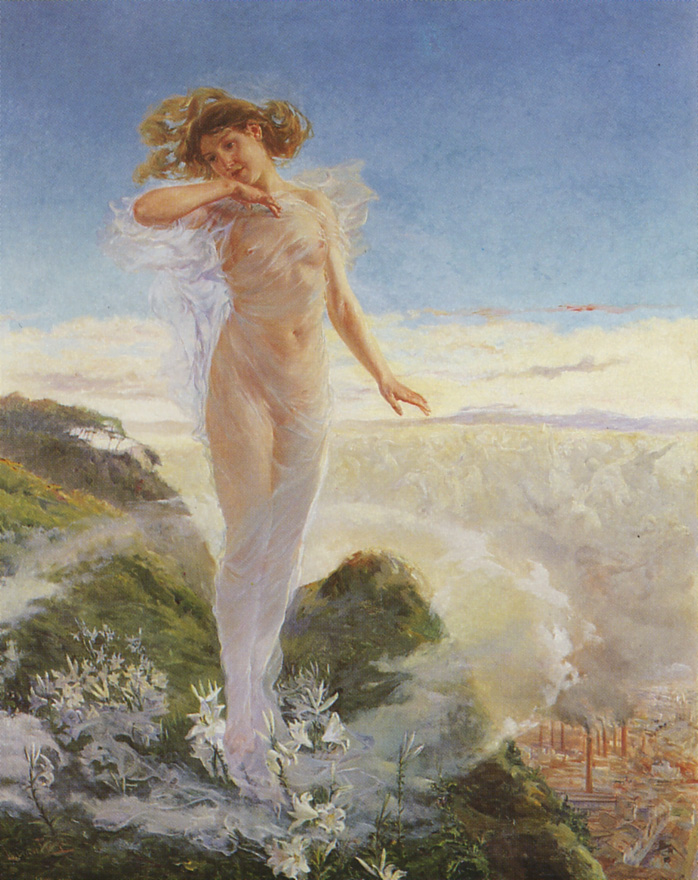
Perfume from the Fields

In 1920, he was awarded the rank of Commander in the Military Order of Saint James of the Sword, and was elevated to the rank of Grand Officer in 1929.

He died at his home in the Santos-o-Velho district of Lisbon, from chronic myocarditis, at the age of sixty-nine. He never married, and had no known children. He was interred at the Prazeres Cemetery. His works may be seen at the National Museum of Contemporary Art, and the José Malhoa Museum in Caldas da Rainha.
