= Amateur Concert =

Painting by Columbano Bordalo Pinheiro

- Concerto de Amadores (Portuguese)
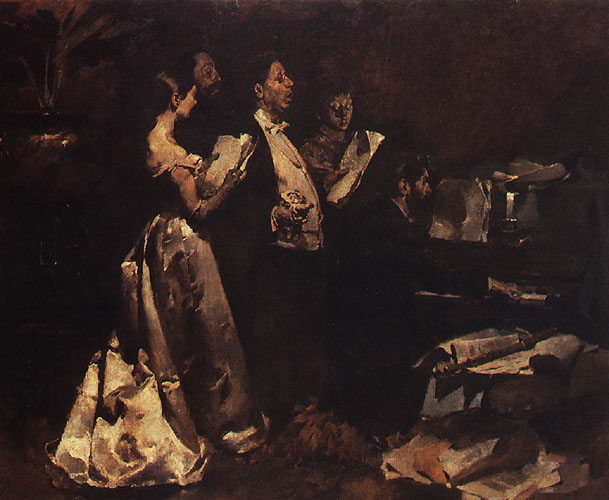
- Artist: Columbano Bordalo Pinheiro
- Year: 1882
- Medium: oil on canvas
- Dimensions: 220 cm × 300 cm (87 in × 120 in)
- Location: National Museum of Contemporary Art of Chiado, Lisbon

Amateur Concert (French title: Soirée Chez Lui) is an oil painting on canvas by the Portuguese painter Columbano Bordalo Pinheiro, from 1882. It is held in the National Museum of Contemporary Art of Chiado, in Lisbon.

== Description ==
The painting measures 220 cm and 300 cm wide. Five people are depicted, singing and playing in the dark: Maria Augusta Bordalo Pinheiro, the artist's sister, in a white satin dress; next to her, the painter Adolfo Greno in right profile; then an Italian singer in a dark suit; in the background Josefa Greno, in a three-quarters view, looking down; and on the far right another painter, Artur Loureiro, at the piano.

== Analysis ==
The large painting was presented at the 1882 Paris Salon under the title Soirée chez lui. The oval composition shows the social circle. It is friendship that unites them both in painting and music, though a shadowy unknown figure next to the piano is watching. In France it was not received well, and in Portugal there was controversy about the abstract and vague figures.
