= Adriano Sousa Lopes =

Portuguese Modernist painter and engraver

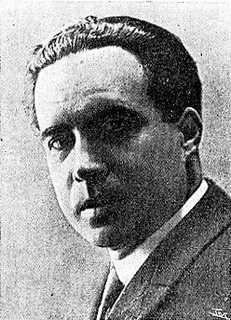
Self-portrait engraving (date unknown)

Adriano Sousa Lopes (20 February 1879, in Leiria – 21 April 1944, in Lisbon) was a Portuguese Modernist painter and engraver who worked in a wide range of genres.

== Biography ==
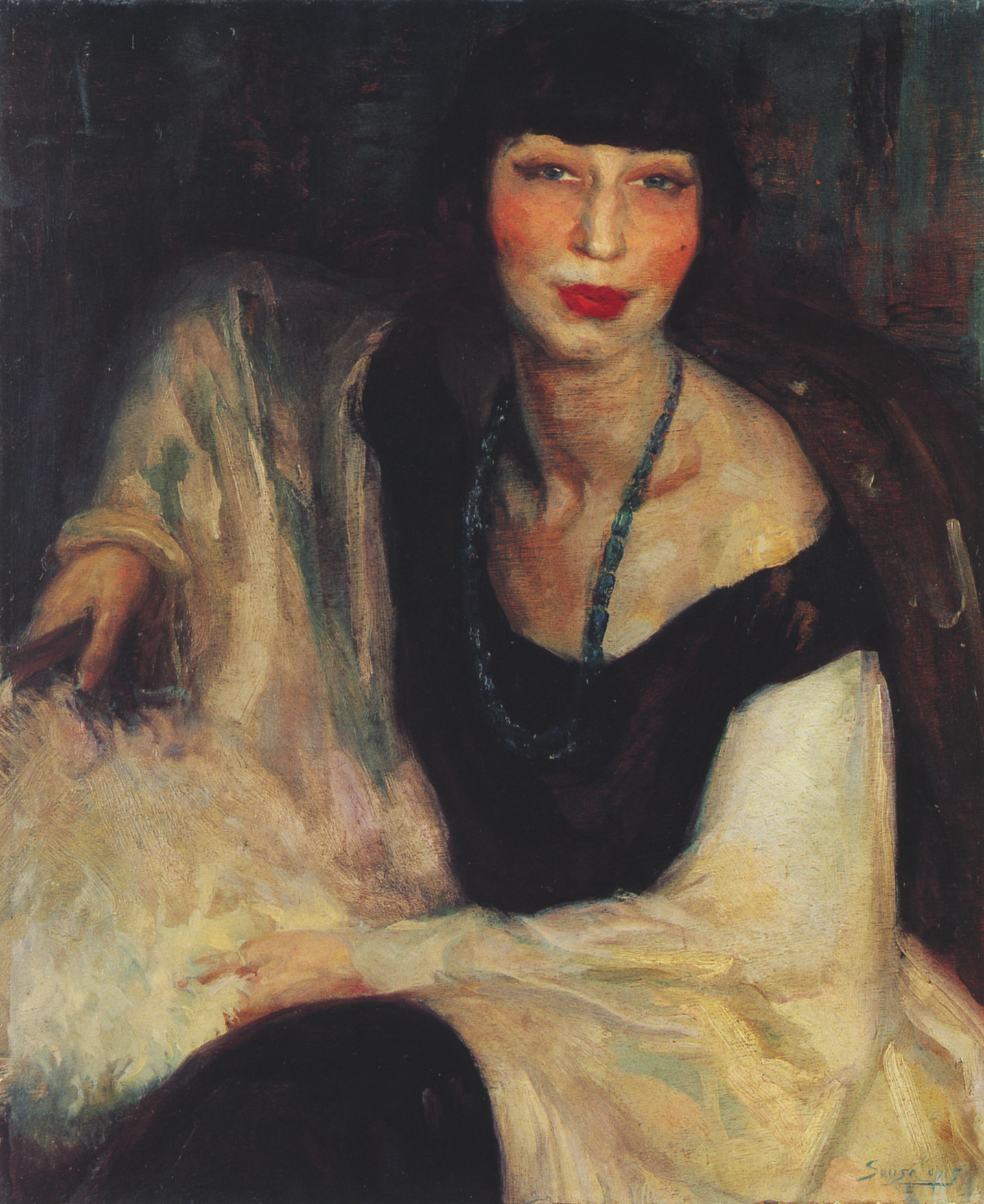
Madame Sousa Lopes (1927)

In 1898, after working for several years as a pharmacy assistant, he entered the "Academia Real de Belas-Artes" (now part of the University of Lisbon) where he studied painting with Veloso Salgado and design with Luciano Freire. In 1903, he received a stipend from the "Legado do Visconde de Valmor", a charitable fund established in 1898 for training artists and acquiring art, among other objectives. He used the money to go to Paris, where he attended the École des Beaux-Arts, where he studied with Pierre Bonnard and Édouard Vuillard, then the Académie Julian; studying with Fernand Cormon.

In 1900, he was awarded the "Prémio Anunciação", a prestigious award named in honor of the painter Tomás da Anunciação. From 1904 to 1912, he exhibited regularly at the Salon d'Automne and made a brief visit to Italy in 1907. In 1915, he helped organize the Fine Arts display for the Portuguese pavilion at the Panama–Pacific International Exposition.

He held his first solo exhibition in 1917 at the "Sociedade Nacional de Belas Artes" in Lisbon. That same year, he went to the Western Front as an official artist with the rank of captain, to record the exploits of the Portuguese Expeditionary Corps. The following year, he settled in Versailles to turn his sketches into paintings and engravings, which were exhibited in Paris in 1923 under the title "Portugal in the Great War". Over the next four years, he travelled throughout Europe and North Africa. Upon returning to Portugal, he succeeded Columbano Bordalo Pinheiro as Director of the Chiado Museum.

During the 1930s, he turned to a more traditional style of painting after he received several official commissions, including murals for the "Museu Militar de Lisboa" and, later, the Main Hall of the National Assembly at São Bento Palace. In 1942, however, he fell ill with heart disease and had to quit the project. He died two years later and the murals were finished by Domingos Rebelo and others, according to precise instructions he had left.

== Selected works ==
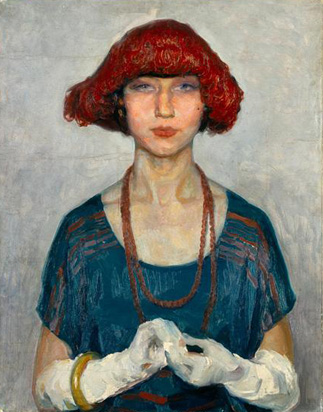
The Blue Blouse (C.1920)

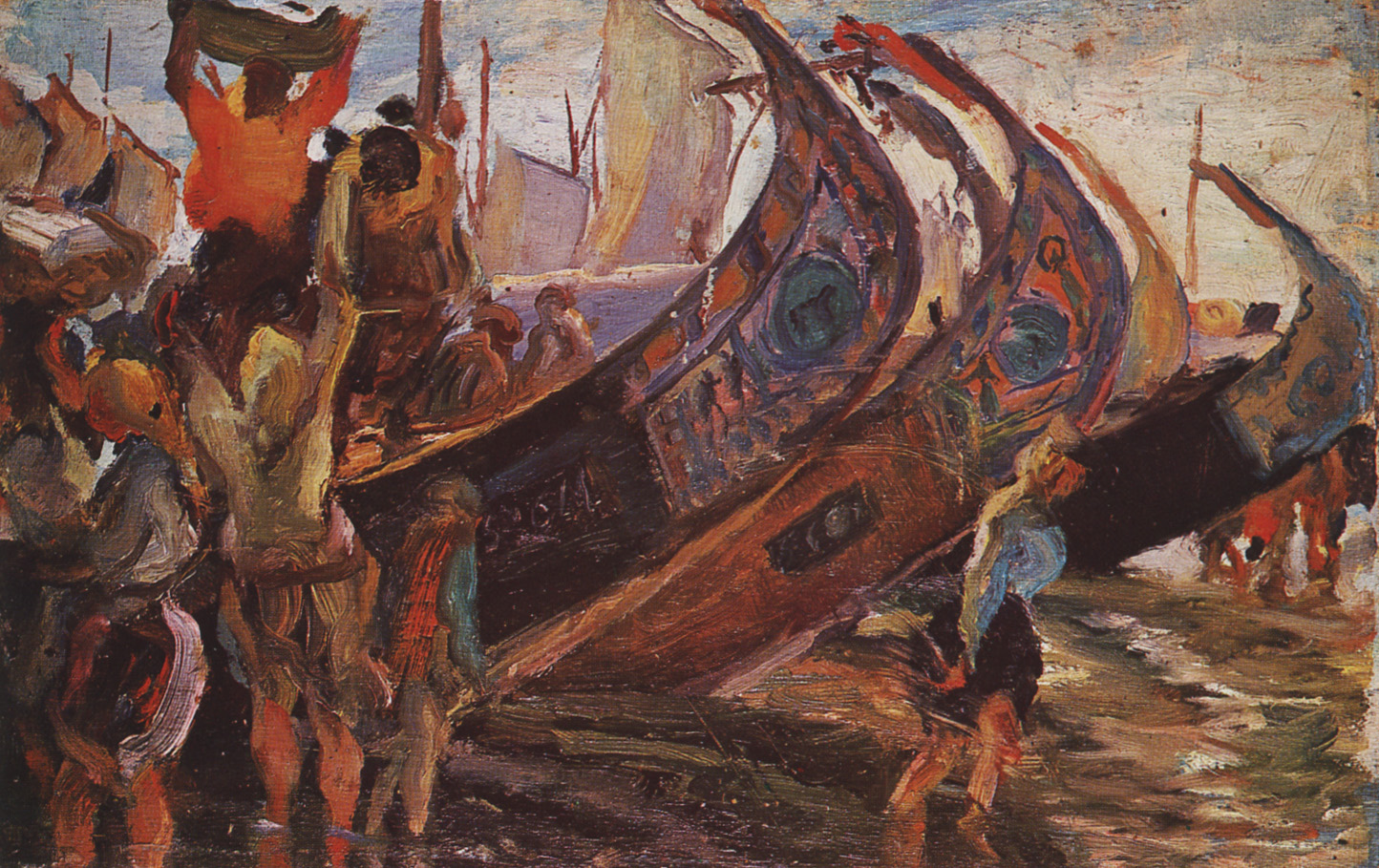
Unloading the Boats (c.1930)

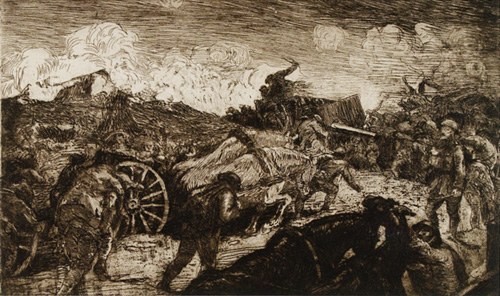
Scene from "Portugal in the Great War" (1920s)

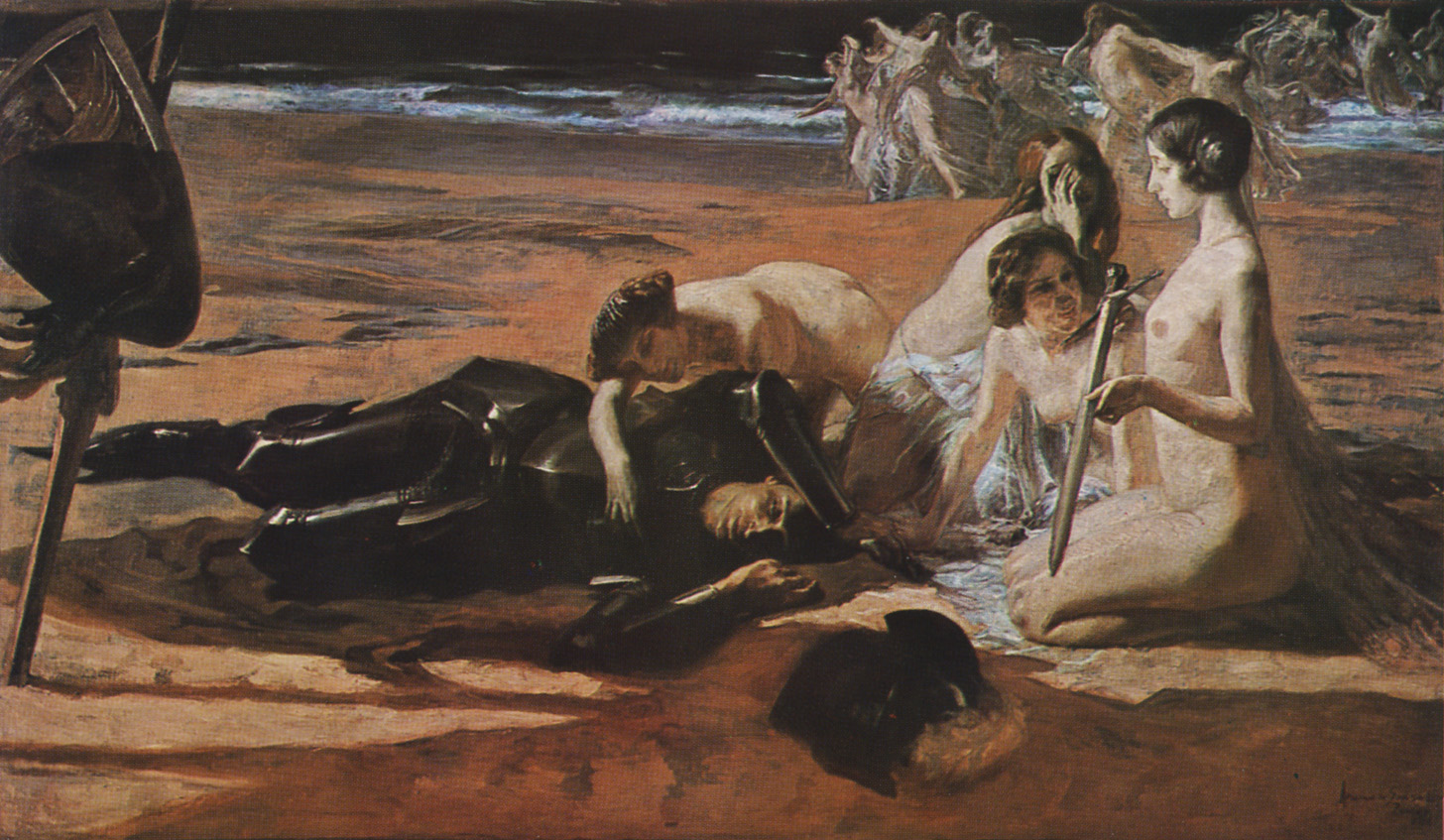
Nymphs (1908)
