= Fialho de Almeida =

Portuguese writer and journalist

José Valentim Fialho de Almeida
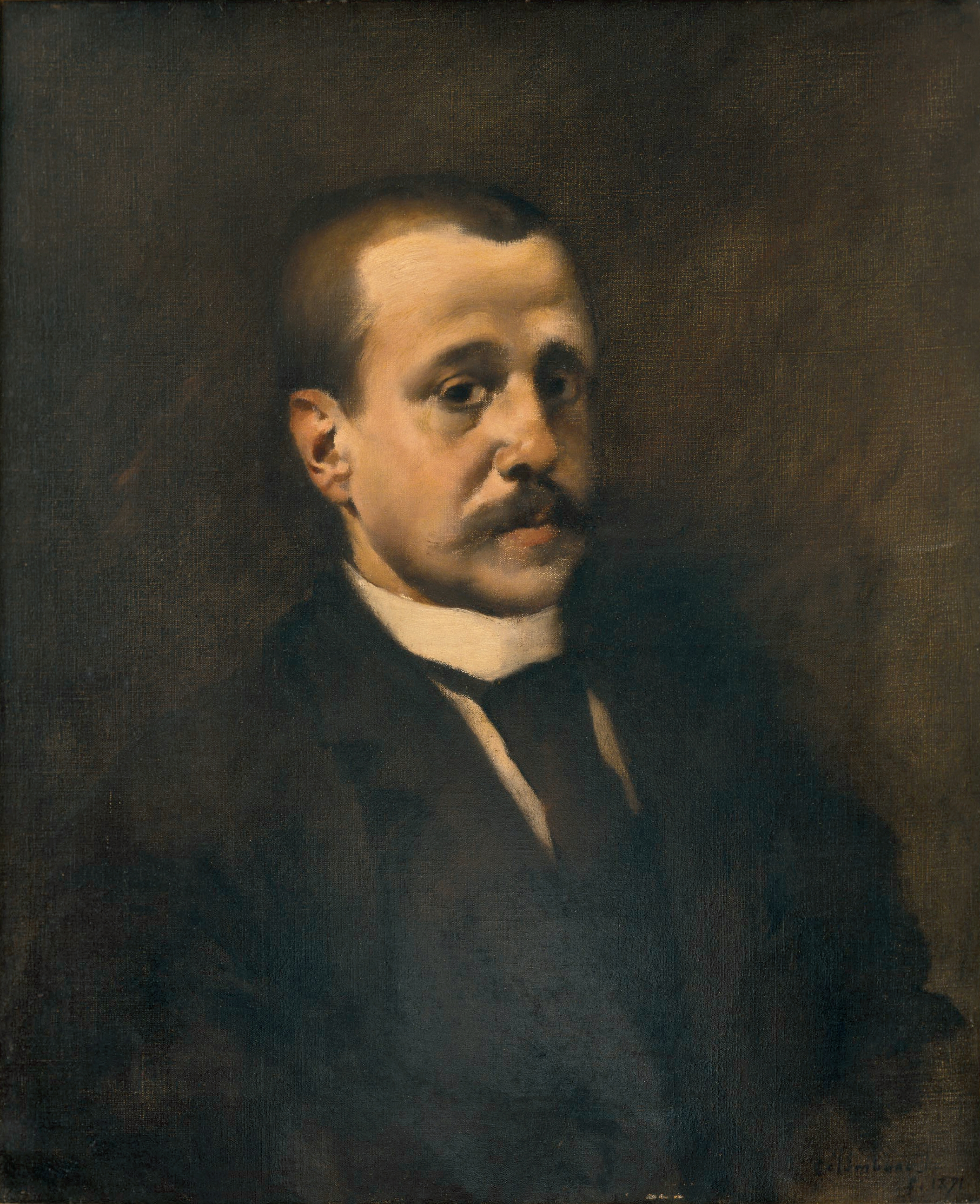
- Portrait of Fialho de Almeida (1891), by Columbano Bordalo Pinheiro
- Born: 7 May 1857; Vidigueira, Portugal
- Died: 4 March 1911 (aged 53); Cuba, Portugal
- Writing career
- Genre: Fictional prose
- Literary movement: Symbolism, Decadent

José Valentim Fialho de Almeida, better known as Fialho de Almeida (7 May 1857 – 4 March 1911), was a Portuguese writer, journalist, and translator associated with Symbolism and the Decadent movement. In his political writings, he often expressed anti-monarchical and republican sentiments.

== Works ==
- Contos (1881)
- A cidade do Vício (1882)
- Os Gatos (1889-1894)
- Lisboa Galante (1890)
- O País das Uvas (1893)
- Galiza (1905)
- Saibam Quantos... (1912) (Non-Fiction)
- Aves Migradoras (1914)
- A taça do rei de Tule e outros contos (2001, Posthumous)
