= Maria Augusta Bordalo Pinheiro =

Portuguese painter

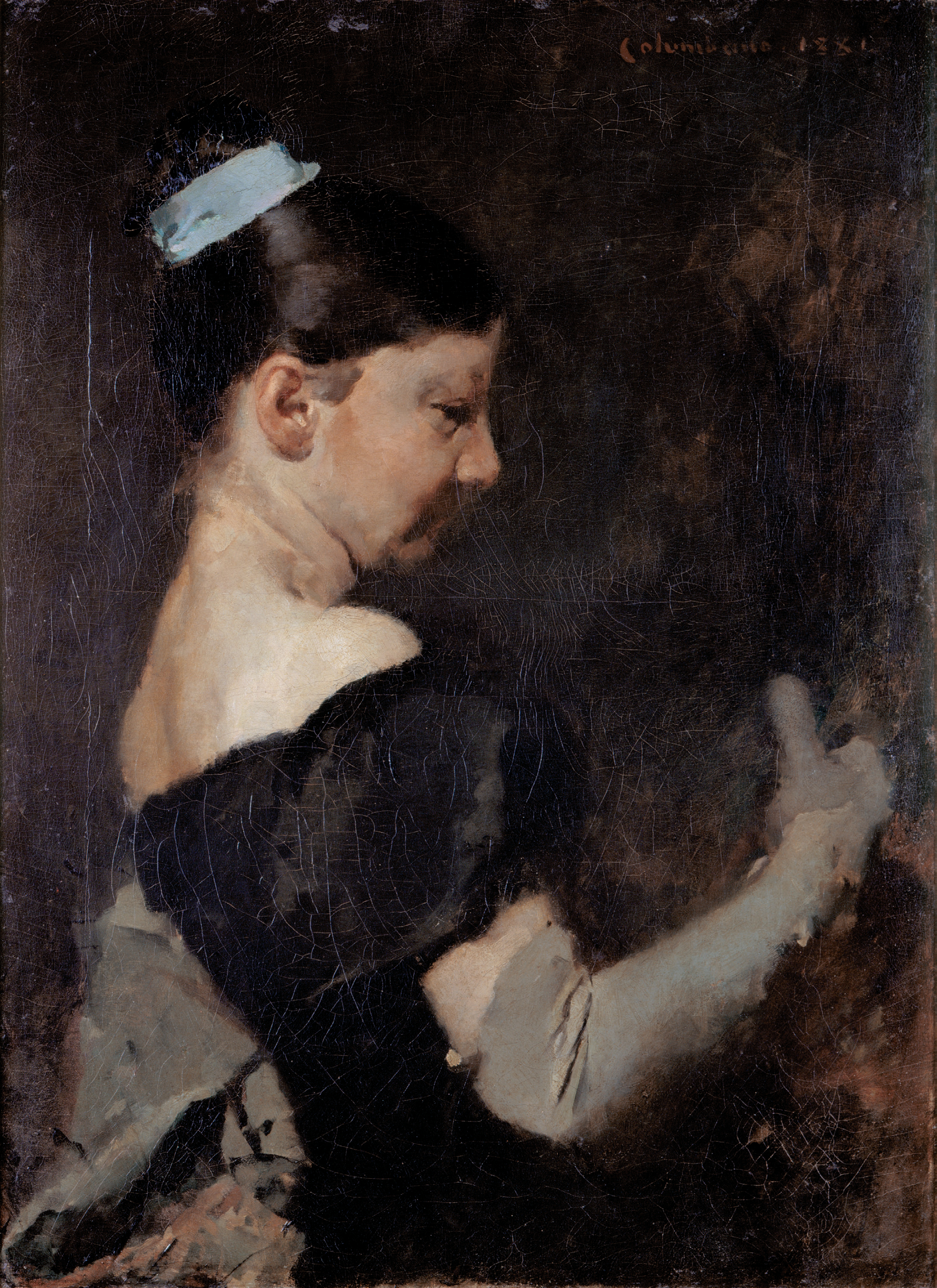
Portrait of Maria Augusta Bordalo Pinheiro by her brother Columbao (1881)

Maria Augusta Bordalo Pinheiro (1841–1915) was a Portuguese painter and lacemaker. A pupil of her father, Manuel Maria Bordalo Pinheiro, and her younger brother, Columbano Bordalo Pinheiro, she is remembered above all for her industrial development of the technique of bobbin lacework and for teaching at the design school in Peniche where she was headmistress. She was widely recognized for her work, above all as a result of the gold medal she received at the 1889 Exposition Universelle in Paris

== Biography ==
Born in Lisbon on 14 November 1841, Maria Augusta Bordalo Pinheiro was the daughter of the Portuguese painter Manuel Maria Bordalo Pinheiro and his wife Augusta Maria née Prostes. Among her siblings were two notable painters, Rafael Bordalo Pinheiro and Columbano Bordalo Pinheiro.

== Career ==
Thanks to her close relationship with her brother, Columbano, who created several portraits of her, she accompanied him on a study trip to Paris in 1881 and became a member of the Portuguese art association Grupo do Leão (Lion's Group) in 1885. As a painter, she specialized in watercolours of flowers, especially chrysanthemums and roses, and frequently participated in exhibitions at the Sociedade Promotora de Belas-Artes. She was also a keen craftswomen, decorating earthenware and, in particular, working with lace.

Bordalo Pinheiro gained fame above all for her mastery in lacework. As a result of her development of bobbin lacework in Portugal, her creations became comparable to the best Chantilly lace from France. From 1887, she ran the industrial design school Escola Industrial Maria Pia in Peniche, developing the traditional art of Portuguese lace making to a high degree of both artistic and technical perfection. In 1889, she exhibited at the Exposition Universelle in Paris where she received a gold medal. Her work was so greatly admired that she was officially encouraged to visit lace-making schools in France and Belgium over the following months. Successful students from her school included Benvinda da Conceição Fernande and Maria Inácia whose work was also exhibited nationally and internationally.

Following Bordalo Pinheiro's gold medal in Paris, bobbin lace became increasingly important in Portugal, transforming the old handicraft into modern industrial and artistic standards. As an industrial art, it became recognized as one of the best in Europe.

Maria Augusta Bordalo Pinheiro died in Lisbon on 22 October 1915.
