= Columbano Bordalo Pinheiro =

Portuguese painter (1857–1929)

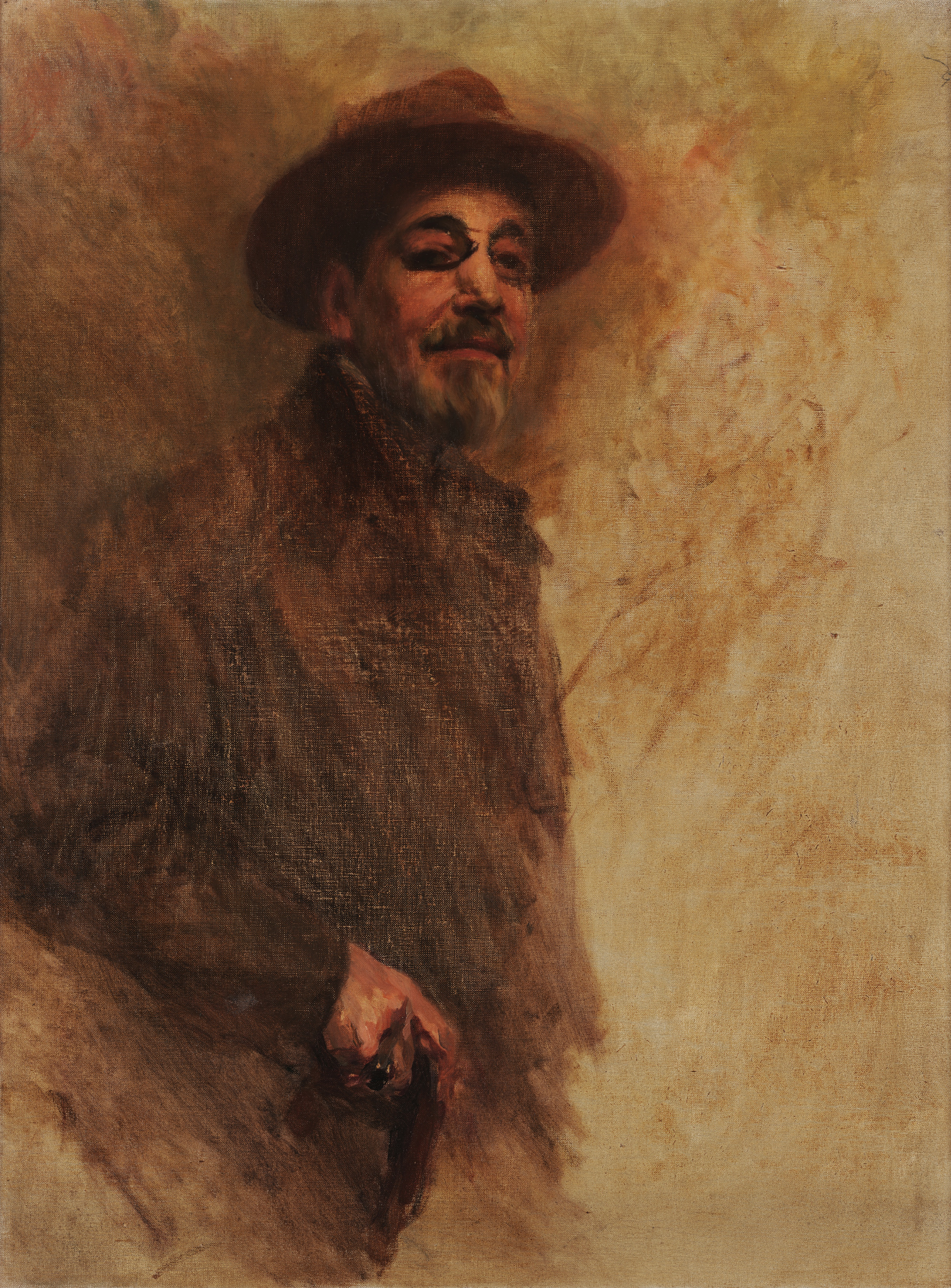
- Self portrait (1929), Chiado Museum, Lisbon
- Born: Columbano Bordalo Pinheiro; 21 November 1857; Cacilhas, Almada, Portugal
- Died: 6 November 1929 (aged 71); Lisbon, Portugal

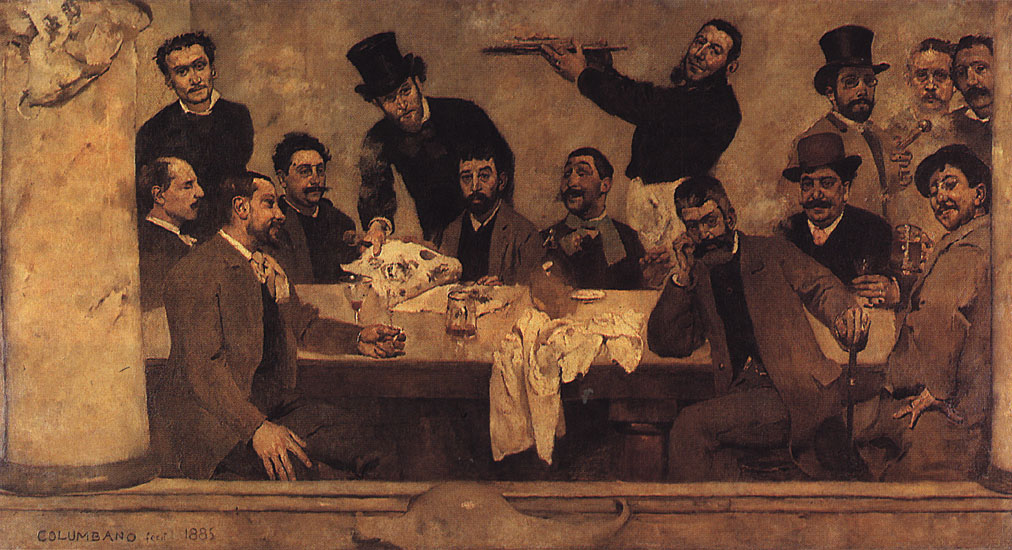
The Lion's Group (1885)

Columbano Bordalo Pinheiro (Almada, 21 November 1857 – Lisbon, 6 November 1929), who is usually referred to as Columbano, was a Portuguese Realist painter. Usually considered the greatest Portuguese painter of the 19th century, he has been compared to the likes of Wilhelm Leibl and John Singer Sargent.

== Life and work ==
Columbano was born in Cacilhas, Portugal. He was the son of romantic painter, Manuel Maria Bordalo Pinheiro, and the younger brother of the great caricaturist, Rafael Bordalo Pinheiro. He became the leading painter of his generation and the master of realism in Portuguese painting, specializing in portraiture. He was disciple of his father, of the painter Miguel Ângelo Lupi and the sculptor Simões de Almeida.

He meet the French painter Carolus-Duran, when he exhibited in Lisbon, in 1881, who was impressed with his talent and encouraged him to study in Paris. After attempting twice for a bursar to study abroad finally, in 1881, the Countess of Edla, second wife of King Ferdinand II would finance Columbano's study in France. He lived there for one year (1881-1882), accompanied by his older sister, Maria Augusta Bordalo Pinheiro. He disliked Carolus-Duran methods of teaching, and was basically self-taught, visiting museums and attending art exhibitions. He studied the work of ancient and contemporary painters, including the French naturalist, realist and impressionist painters, like Courbet, Manet and Degas. He rejected impressionism and felt closer to contemporary naturalist and realist French painters, such as Henri Fantin-Latour. He exhibited at the Salon of 1882, in Paris. He developed his own his distinctive style which is often gloomy and intimist.

He was the co-founder of the Grupo do Leão (The Lion's Group), a usual meeting of artists, writers and intellectuals in a Lisbon downtown restaurant called "Leão de Ouro" (The Golden Lion) in order to discuss aesthetic issues and proclaim Naturalism against the academic art of the time. The group also included his brother Rafael Bordalo Pinheiro, Silva Porto, Marques de Oliveira and José Malhoa.

He painted portraits of some of the greatest names of the Portuguese society and culture of his time, particularly the leading names of the Generation of 70 (Geração de 70), who introduced realism in the country, namelly José Maria de Eça de Queiroz (portrait lost), Joaquim Pedro de Oliveira Martins, Antero de Quental, Guerra Junqueiro and Teófilo Braga, and, from other generations, Raul Brandão and Teixeira de Pascoaes. He had great psychological accuracy in defining the personality of those depicted. His most famous portrait, considered often his masterpiece, was that of the poet and philosopher Antero de Quental, from 1889. In this haunting work Columbano seems to have anticipated Antero's suicide.

Columbano was a well known Republican, so it wasn't surprising that after the Republic proclamation, in 1910, he was invited to design the flag of the new regime. He would be nominated director of the National Museum of Contemporary Art, currently the National Museum of Contemporary Art of Chiado, in Lisbon, of which he was in charge from 1914 to 1927.

The best collection of his paintings is in the National Museum of Contemporary Art of Chiado, in Lisbon. He's also represented in some of the finest Portuguese museums, like the National Museum Soares dos Reis, in Porto.

== Selected portraits ==
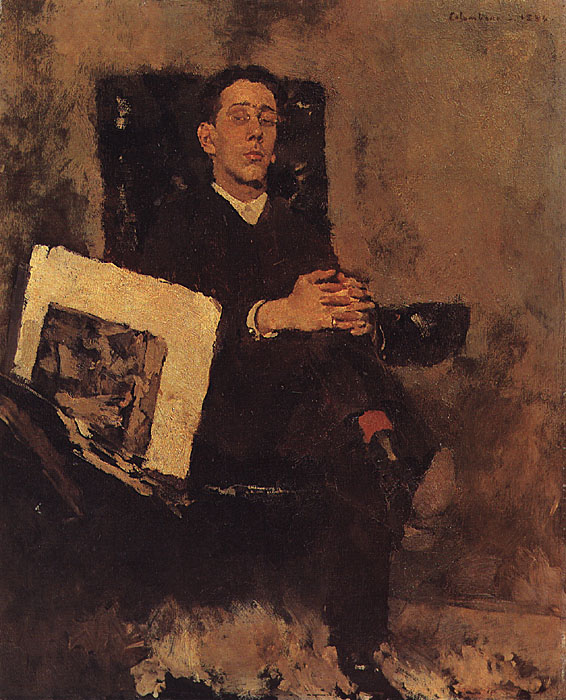
Manuel Gustavo Bordalo Pinheiro (1884)

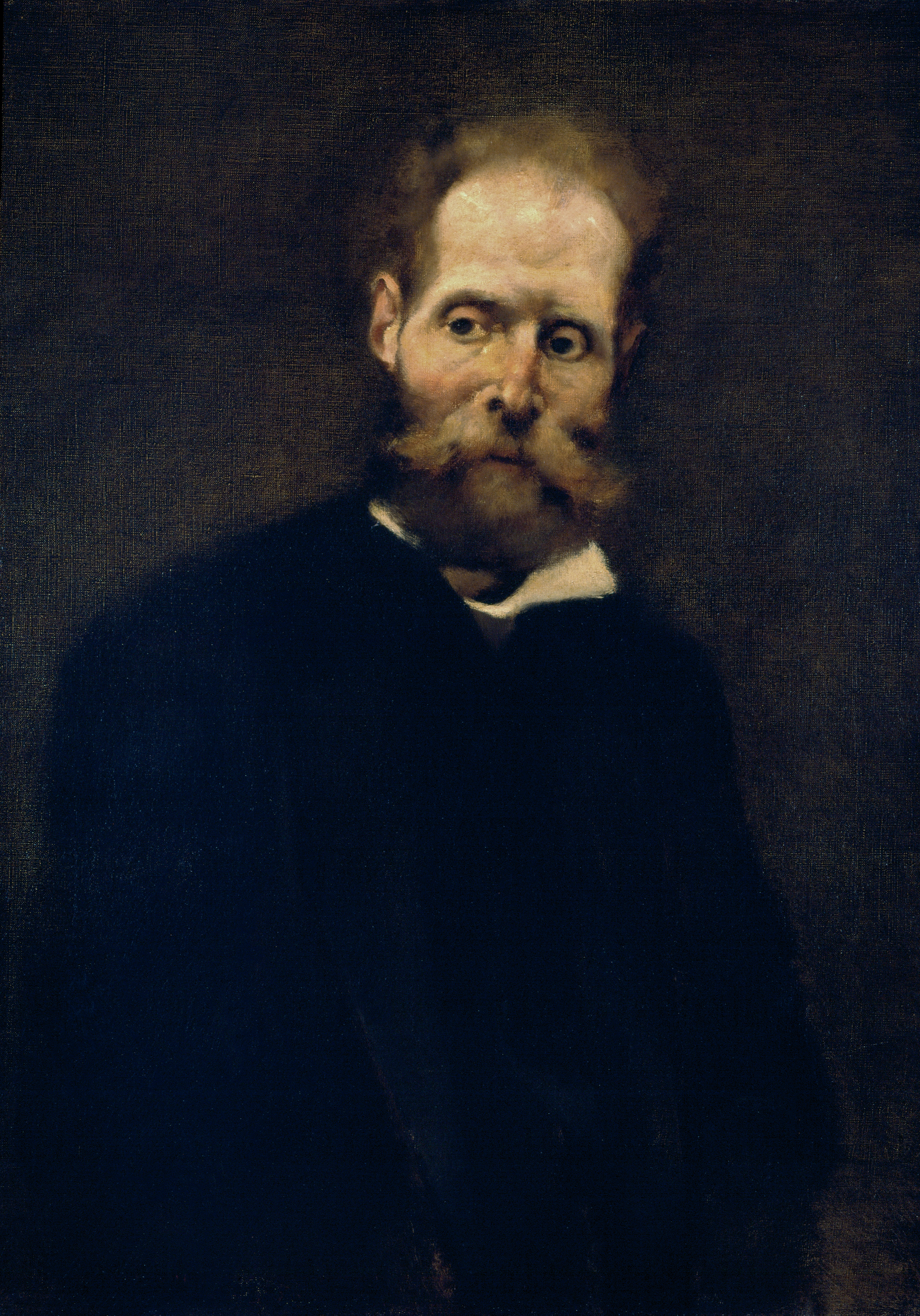
Antero de Quental (1889)

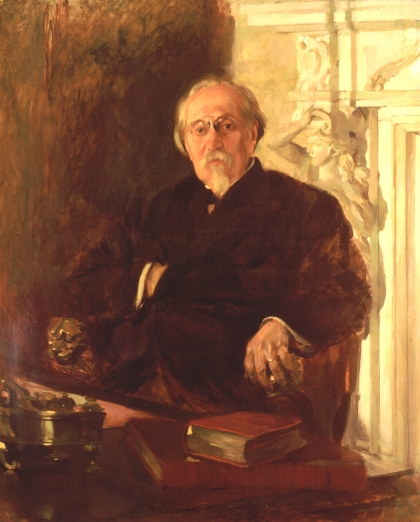
Manuel de Arriaga (c. 1912)

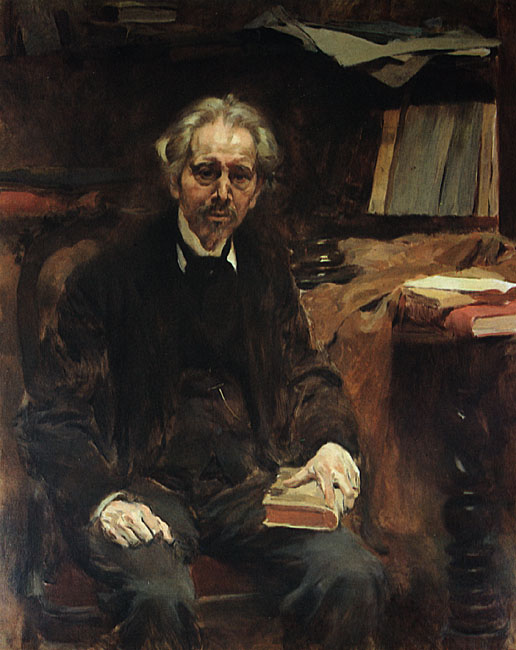
Teófilo Braga (1917)

== Other works ==
- Amateur Concert
