= Rafael Bordalo Pinheiro =

Portuguese artist (1846–1905)

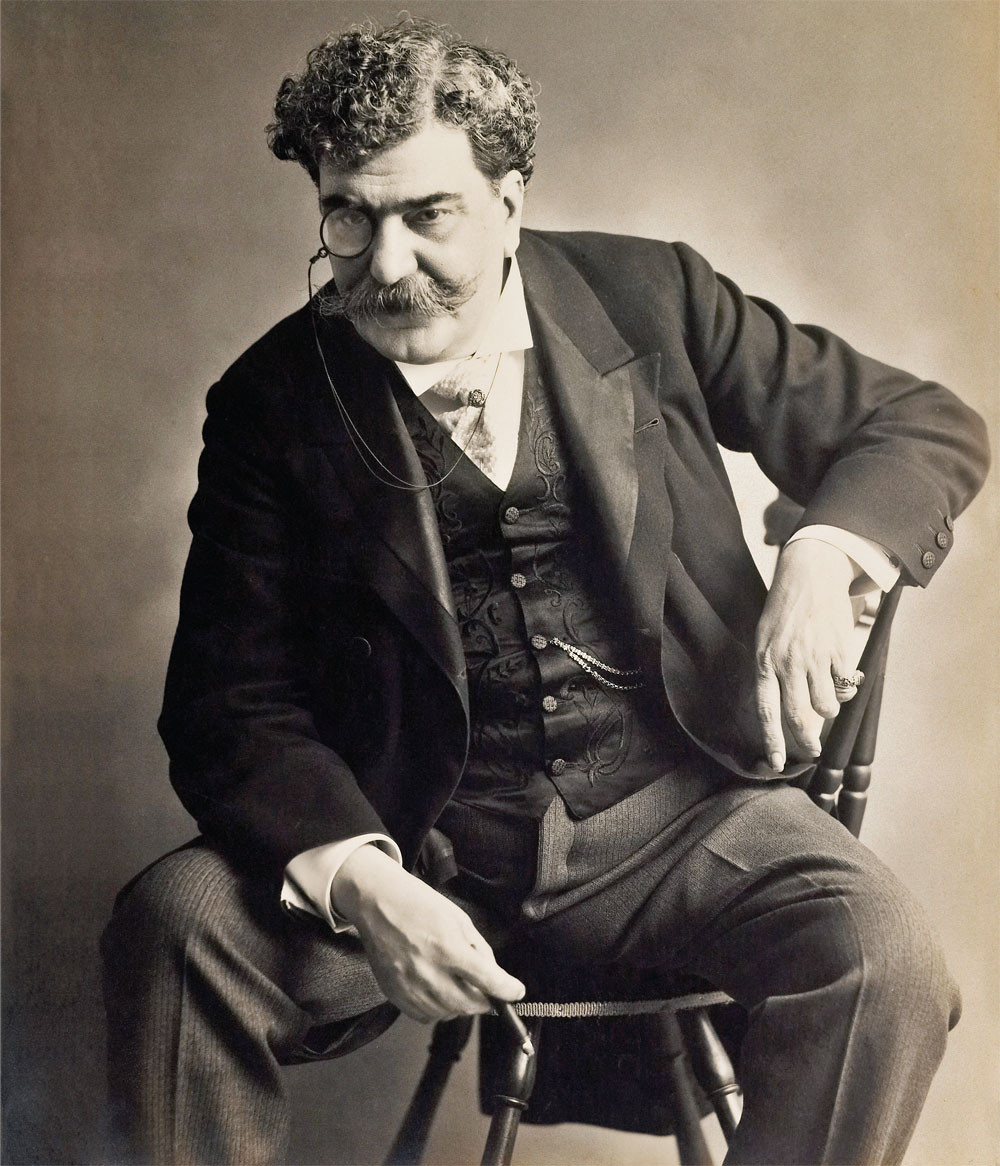
- Rafael Bordalo Pinheiro (date unknown).
- Born: Raphael Augusto Prostes Bordallo Pinheiro; 21 March 1846 Lisbon, Kingdom of Portugal
- Died: 23 January 1905 (aged 58) Lisbon, Portugal
- Notable works: Zé Povinho (1875)

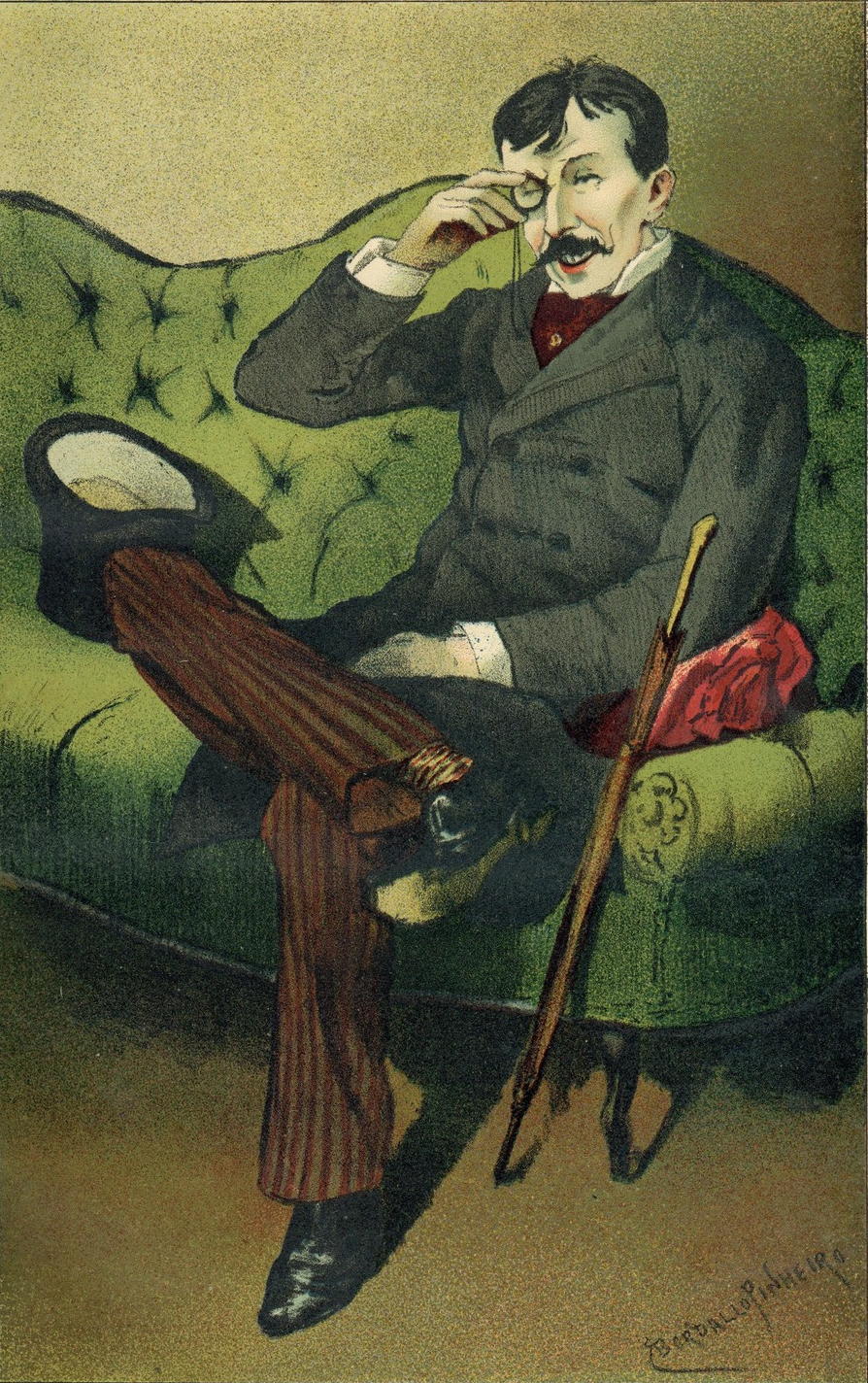
Caricature of Eça de Queiroz by Bordalo Pinheiro, published in 1880, part of the satirical serial Álbum das Glórias

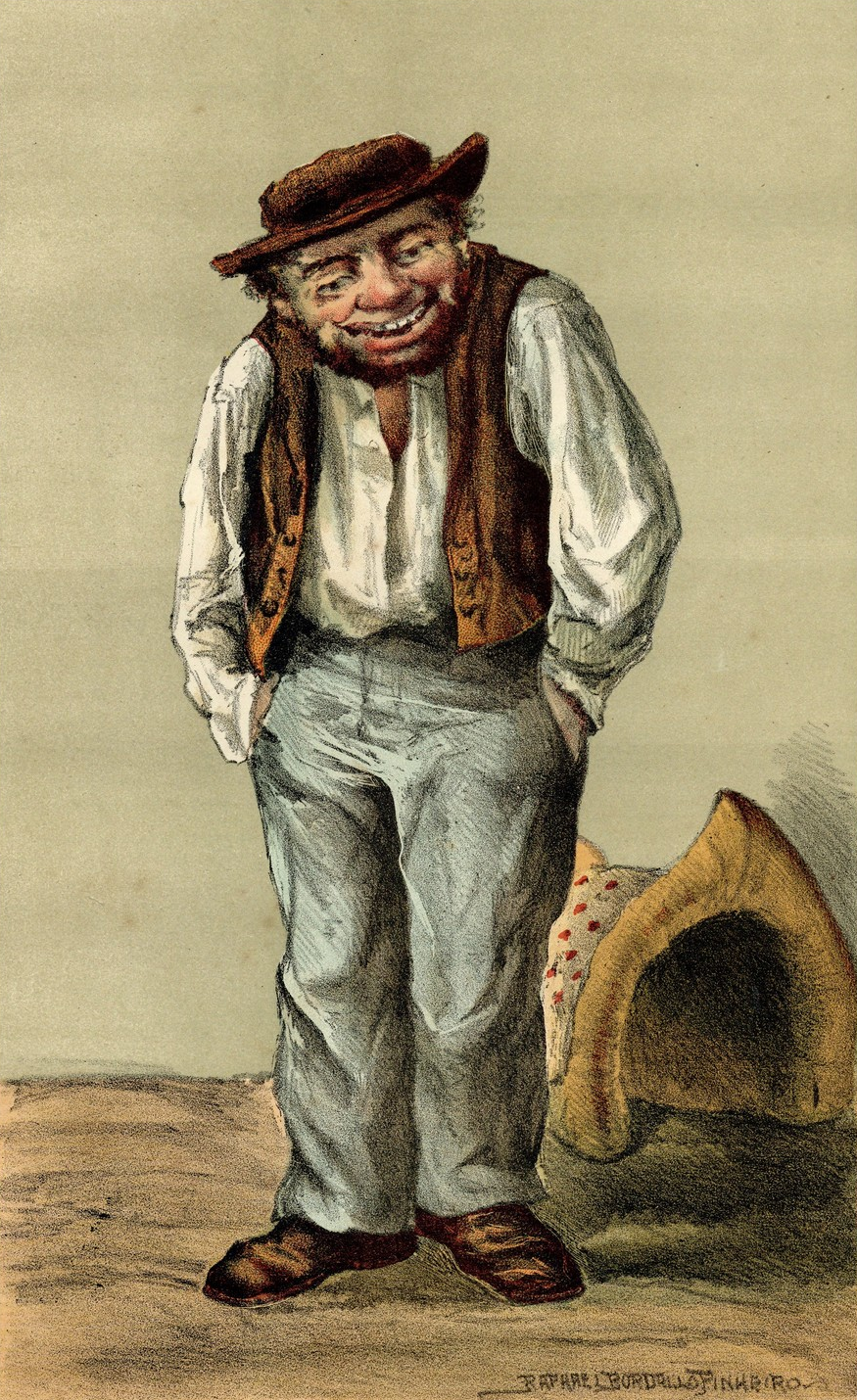
Zé Povinho, Bordalo Pinheiro's famous creation

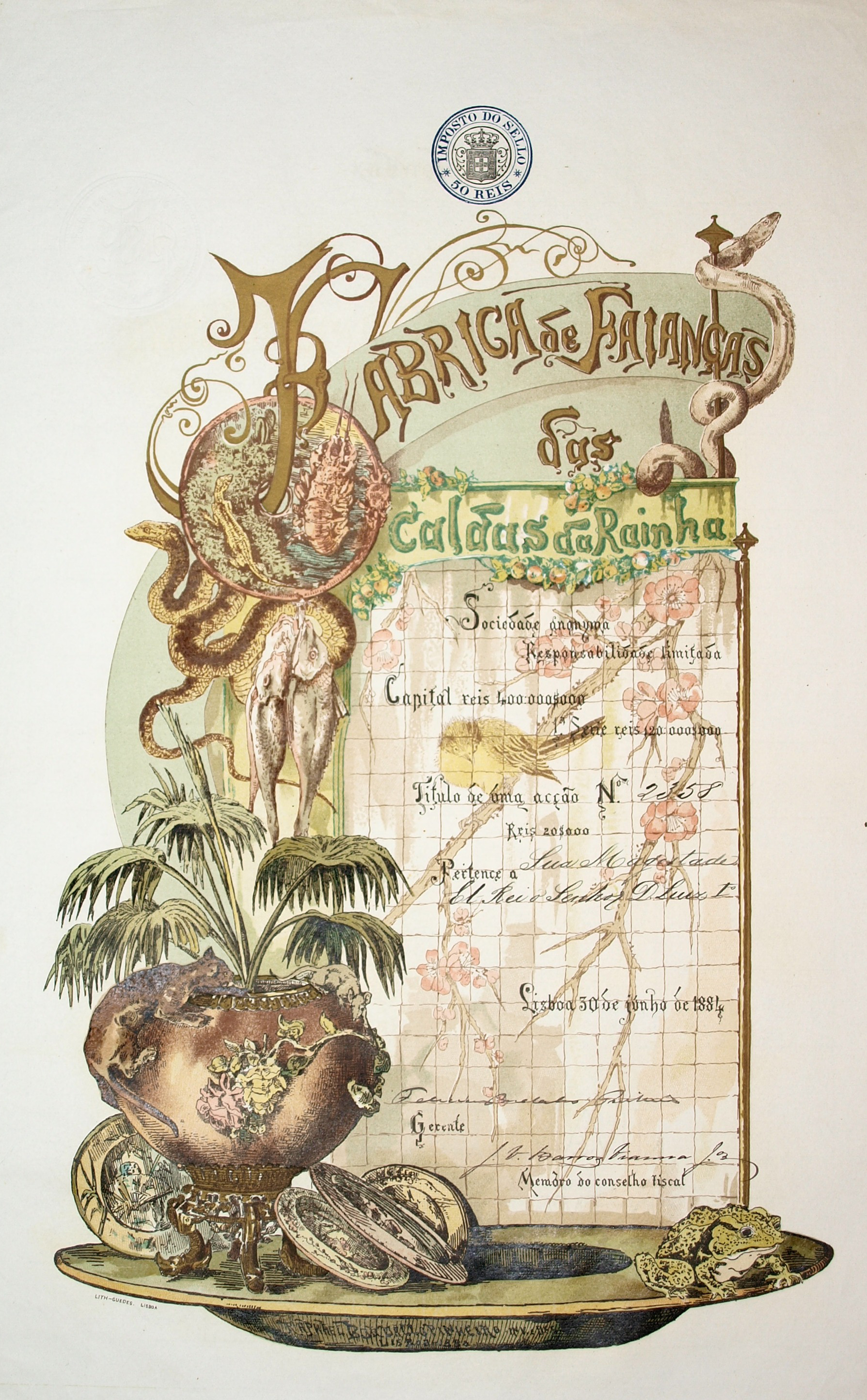
Share of the Fábrica de Faianças das Caldas da Rainha vom 30. Juni 1884, designed by Rafael Bordalo Pinheiro

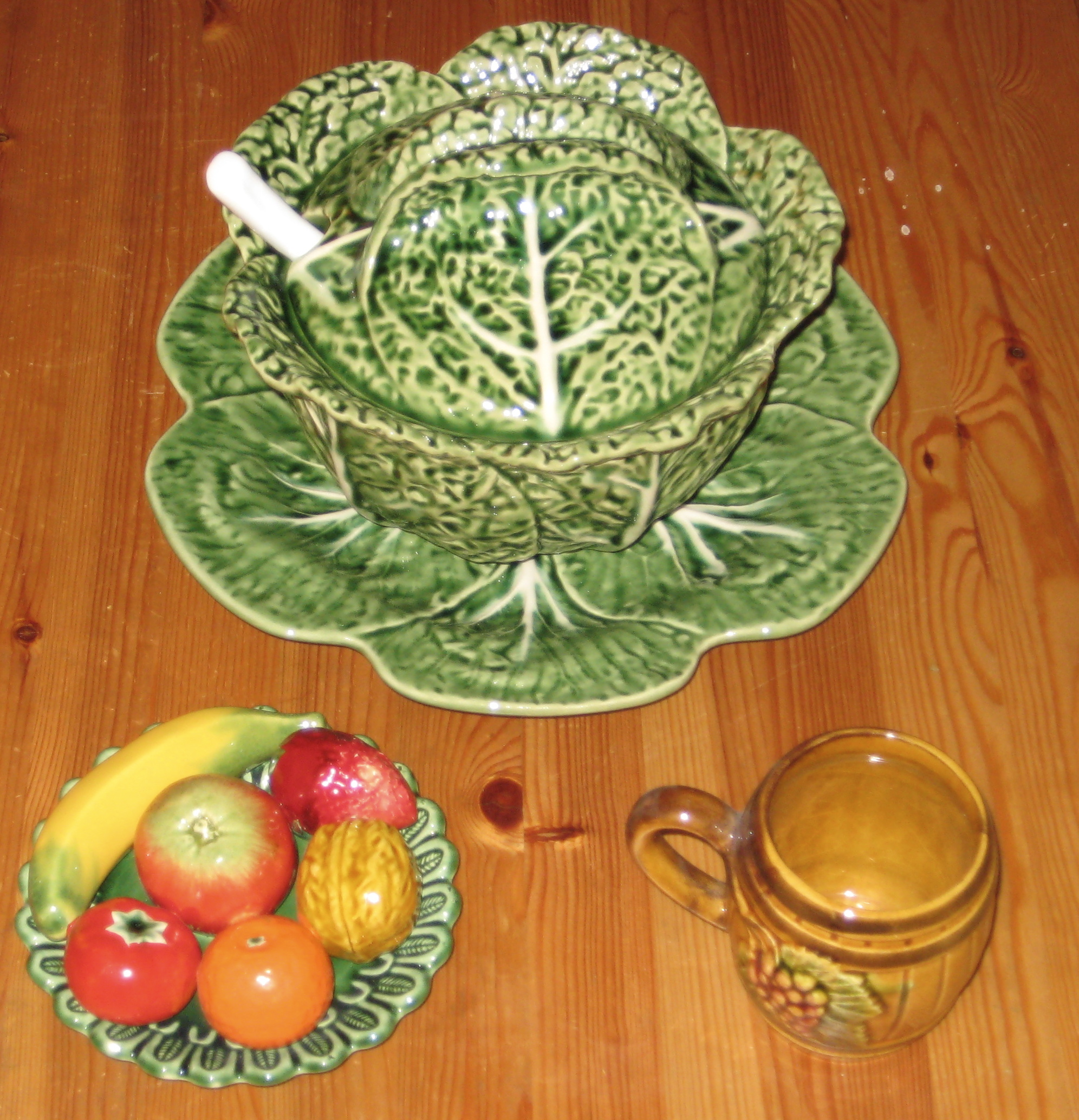
Examples of typical cabbage-shaped pottery from Caldas da Rainha, which became a symbol of Portuguese design

Rafael Bordalo Pinheiro (21 March 1846 – 23 January 1905; spelled Raphael Bordallo Pinheiro in older Portuguese orthography) was a Portuguese artist known for his illustration, caricatures, sculpture, and ceramics designs. Bordalo Pinheiro created the popular cartoon character Zé Povinho (1875) and is considered the first Portuguese comics creator.

== Life ==
Rafael Bordalo Pinheiro was a disciple of his father, the painter Manuel Maria Bordalo Pinheiro. His mother was Donna Maria Augusta do Ó Carvalho Prostes and his brother the painter Columbano Bordalo Pinheiro.

He started publishing illustrations and political caricatures in humoristic magazines such as A Berlinda and O Calcanhar de Aquiles (the first satirical cartoon pamphlet in Portugal), frequently demonstrating a sarcastic humour with a political or social message.

In 1875, he travelled to Brazil to work as an illustrator and cartoonist for the publication Mosquito (and later, another publication called O Besouro), which was also employing the Italian/Brazilian illustrator Angelo Agostini, until then the unrivaled cartooning authority of Brazil. Pinheiro eventually became editor of other humorous, politically critical magazines. His fame as a caricaturist led the Illustrated London News to become one of his collaborators.

He married Elvira Ferreira de Almeida in 1866, and the following year, his son Manuel Gustavo Bordalo Pinheiro was born.

In 1881, he published the illustrated reportage No Lazareto de Lisboa ("The Lazaretto of Lisbon") that included personal thoughts and anecdotes (not unlike a Joe Sacco or Guy Delisle chronicle), and is considered an early example of autobiographical comics.

Rafael Bordalo Pinheiro died on 23 January 1905 in Chiado, Lisbon. He had a Catholic funeral, which was attended by several dozen people, including prominent politicians.

== Zé Povinho and comics ==
In 1875, Bordalo Pinheiro created the cartoon character Zé Povinho (literal translation: "Joe Little People"), a Portuguese everyman, portrayed as a poor peasant. He became first a symbol of the Portuguese farming poor, and eventually into the unofficial personification of Portugal.

In Zé Povinho, as in his other works, Bordalo Pinheiro's drawing style was innovative and influential, making extensive use of onomatopoeia, graphical signs (such as those used to represent movement), strong images (the manguito), and his unique style of mixing punctuation marks, such as brackets, with drawing.

== Pottery ==
In 1885, he founded a ceramics factory in Caldas da Rainha, where he created many of the pottery designs for which this city is known. Raphael Bordallo Pinheiro was responsible for the technical and artistic aspects, and his brother Feliciano Bordallo Pinheiro was in charge of the organizational aspects of the factory. He developed pieces of great technical, artistic, and creative quality, painted tiles (azulejos), panels, pots, table centerpieces, vase busts, fountain basins, pitchers, plates, perfume bottles, vases, and gigantic animals, etc., which in his hands quickly acquired an original character.

The factory is still in business. Bordalo Pinheiro was devoted to the production of ceramic pieces.

== Legacy ==
The Rafael Bordalo Pinheiro Museum in Lisbon is dedicated to his life and works.

== Sources ==
- Pinheiro, Bordalo (1846 - 1905) Encyclopaedia Itaú Cultural
