= José Malhoa =

Portuguese painter (1855–1933)

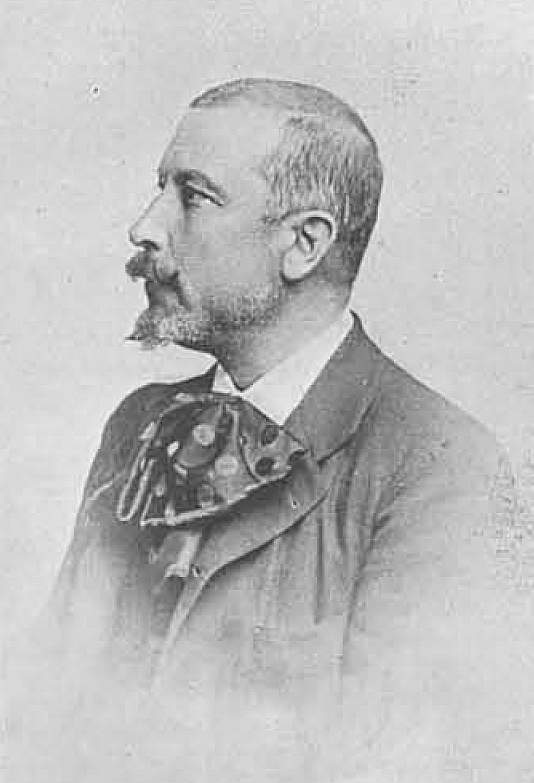
- José Malhoa
- Born: José Vital Branco Malhoa; 28 April 1855; Caldas da Rainha, Portugal
- Died: 26 October 1933 (aged 78); Figueiró dos Vinhos, Portugal
- Known for: Painting
- Notable work: The Drunks, 1907, Fado, 1910, Autumn, 1918
- Movement: Naturalism

José Vital Branco Malhoa, known simply as José Malhoa (28 April 1855 – 26 October 1933) was a Portuguese painter.

== Biography ==
Malhoa was, with Columbano Bordalo Pinheiro, the leading name in Portuguese naturalist painting in the second half of the 19th century. They were both members of the Grupo do Leão (Lion Group), a group of artists and writers in the 1880s. He often painted popular scenes and subjects, like his two most famous paintings: The Drunks (1907) and Fado (1910). He always remained faithful to the naturalist style, but in some of his works there are impressionist influences, as in his Autumn (1918), that can be considered an "impressionist exercise".

Malhoa was born in Caldas da Rainha, and studied art at the Royal Academy of Fine Arts in Lisbon from the age of 12. He died in Figueiró dos Vinhos, aged 78. At the end of his life, he saw the inauguration of the José Malhoa Museum, in Caldas da Rainha.

Malhoa's House, also known as the Dr. Anastácio-Gonçalves House-Museum, in Lisbon, was originally built in 1905 as a residence and studio for the artist. It was bought by Dr. Anastácio-Gonçalves, an art collector, a year before the painter's death, and it became a museum in 1980, showcasing several items from his collection, namely works from Portuguese painters of the 19th and 20th century.

From 1921 until his death he was the master of the renowned painter Maria de Lourdes de Mello e Castro, who was his last disciple.

In 1933, the year of his death, the José Malhoa Museum was created in Caldas da Rainha. He had artistic collaboration in the magazine Atlântida. (1915-1920). His well known studio, named "Casulo", in Figueiró dos Vinhos, is restored and available for visits.

He was buried in the Prazeres Cemetery, in Lisbon.

== Works ==
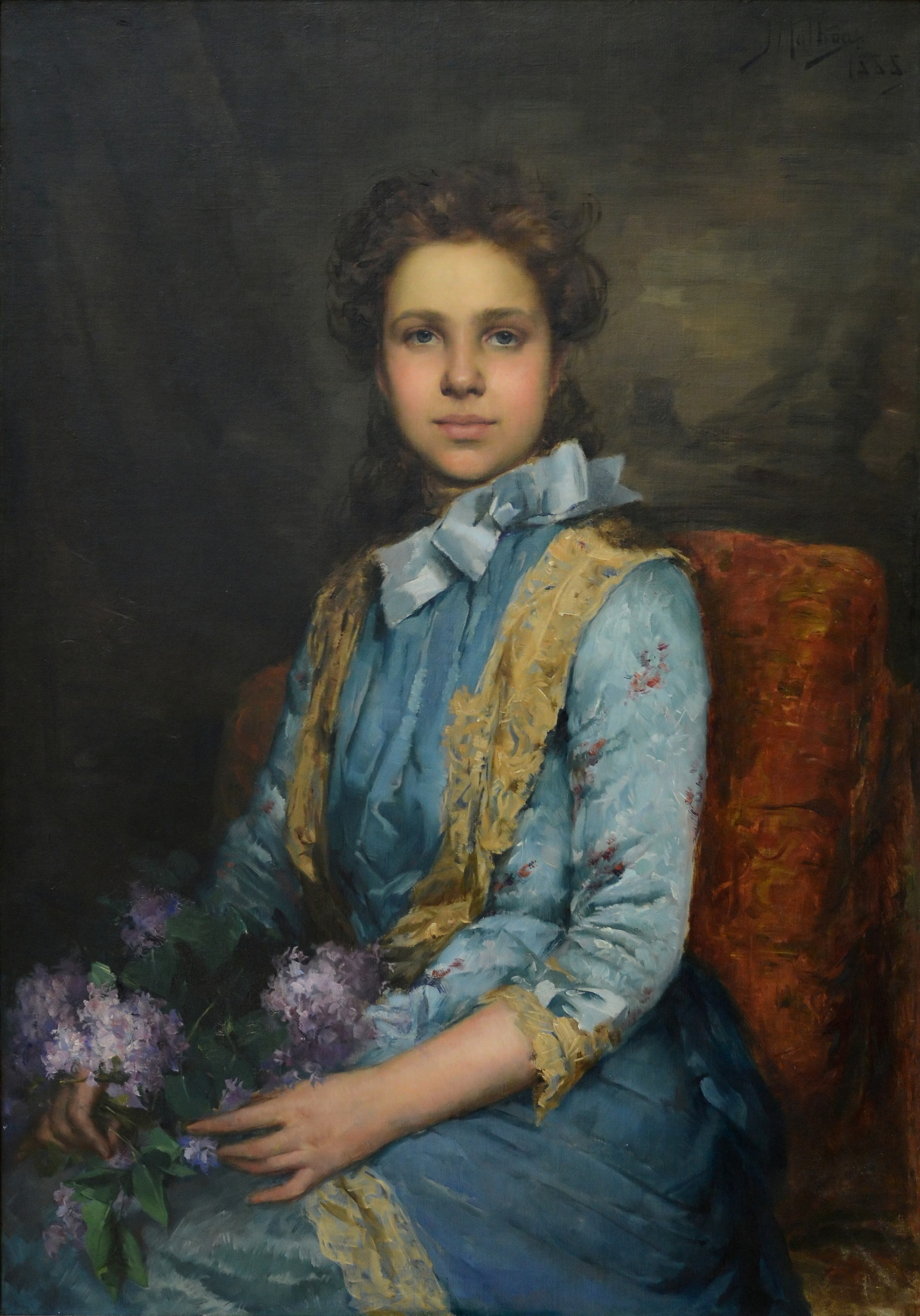
The portrait of Laura Sauvinet, a pupil of the artist, was considered by José Malhoa as his masterpiece. Museu José Malhoa, Caldas da Rainha, Portugal

The Soares dos Reis National Museum houses Desalento (Despondency); Island of Love; Promises and the famous O Fado.

== Literature ==
- Henriques, P.: José Malhoa; INAPA, Lisbon, 1996. ISBN 972-9019-87-8
