= National Museum of Contemporary Art of Chiado =

Art museum in Lisbon, Portugal

National Museum of Contemporary Art (Chiado Museum)
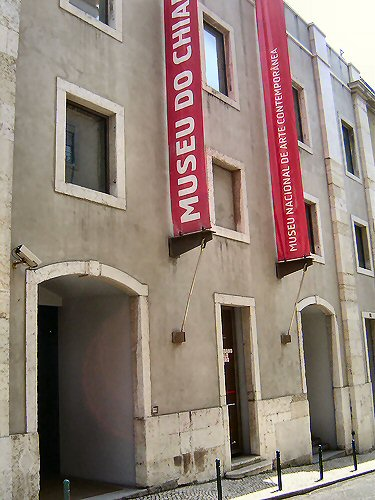
- Established: 1911
- Location: Chiado, Lisbon
- Coordinates: 38°42′32″N 9°08′28″W
- Type: Art museum
- Visitors: 52,901 (2022)
- Website: www.museuartecontemporanea.gov.pt/en
- Location of National Museum of Contemporary Art (Chiado Museum)

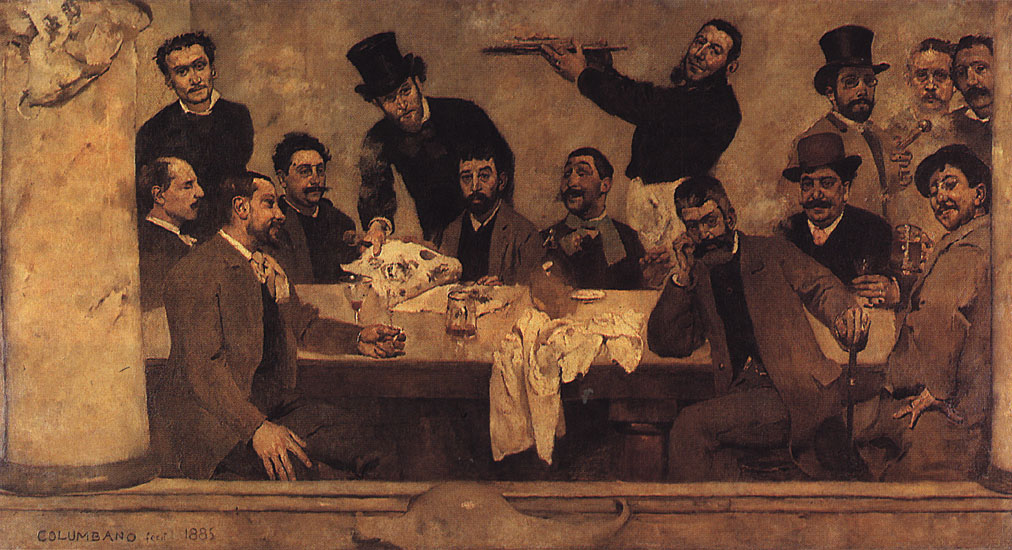
"Grupo do Leão" (Lion's Group, 1885), painting by Columbano in the Chiado Museum

The National Museum of Contemporary Art of Chiado (Chiado Museum, in Portuguese: Museu Nacional de Arte Contemporânea do Chiado – MNAC) is an art museum located in the Chiado neighbourhood of Lisbon, Portugal. It was created in 1911 and re-inaugurated, in new installations, in 1994.

The museum covers the period between 1850 and 1950, with works by the foremost Portuguese artists of the period, as well as some foreigners. It holds the best collection of Portuguese painting and sculpture from the Romanticism, Naturalism, and Modern periods.

Among the artists represented are António Silva Porto, António Carneiro, António Soares dos Reis, Miguel Ângelo Lupi, Columbano Bordalo Pinheiro, Amadeo de Souza Cardoso, Abel Manta, Dórdio Gomes, Adriano Sousa Lopes, José de Almada Negreiros, Nadir Afonso, Mário Eloy, Francisco Augusto Metrass, Mónica de Miranda, Auguste Rodin, and many others. The museum also hosts temporary exhibitions.

Since 1911, the Chiado Museum has occupied part of the old Convent of São Francisco (Saint Francis) in Lisbon, a building of mediaeval origin. The 1994 adaptation and renovation of the museum areas were done by French architect Jean-Michel Wilmotte.

== Recent history ==
2021

During the confinements due to the COVID-19 pandemic, the Education Service launched the online lecture cycle ‘Conversas Sobre o Retrato’ that gave voice to several scholars specialized in Art History, Art Criticism, Painting, Photography, Literature and Fashion, as well as the drawing and painting course ‘O Fungagá das Artes’ presented by artists Nelson Ferreira and António Faria. ‘O Fungagá das Artes’ proved to be extremely popular and reached 42,000 families per episode. The thousands of drawings made at home served as a ticket to MNAC for the whole family. The program ‘O Fungagá das Artes’ was later awarded by the Portuguese Association of Museology with the APOM 2022 Award for best Education and Cultural Mediation Project.

2022

As the museum is a space for dialogue and that caters for all age groups, the exhibition for children "The other life of animals" was organised. This show brought together several artists, having as its theme the loss of biodiversity. MNAC also organized the first ever exhibition of Veloso Salgado in France, with about 60 artworks, making known the connection of this master to the painters of Wissant. It also inaugurated Nelson Ferreira's exhibition "Painting rarefied the spirit" which was the fruit of the first artistic residency in MNAC's Sculpture Garden. This show displayed watercolours inspired by the museum's permanent collection, and these paintings were a tribute to academic artists. The blue tones present in the paintings executed during this artistic residency led to the creation of the experimental short film Azul no Azul (English title:Blue in Blue).
