= Miguel Ângelo Lupi =

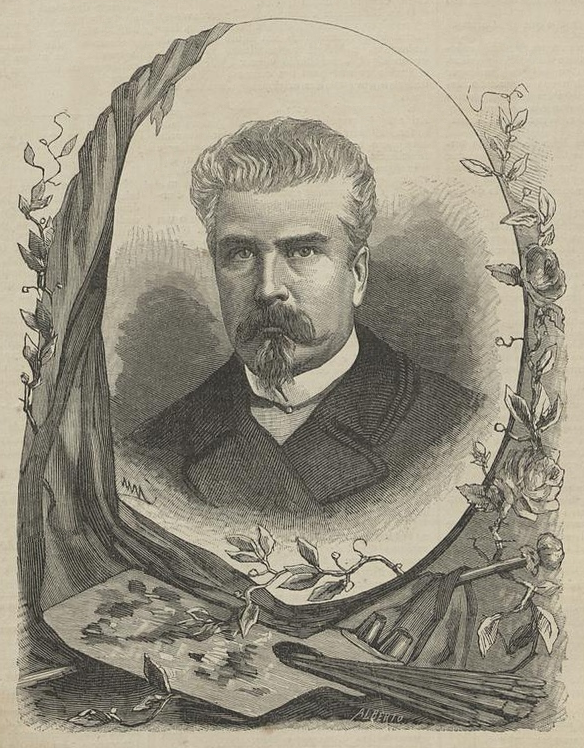
- Born: 8 May 1826; Lisbon, Portugal
- Died: 26 February 1883 (aged 56); Lisbon, Portugal
- Known for: Painting
- Notable work: Media related to Miguel Lupi at Wikimedia Commons
- Movement: Romantic

Miguel Ângelo Lupi (8 May 1826–26 February 1883) was a Portuguese painter and art professor, who worked in the Romantic style. He was known primarily for portraits and historical scenes.

== Biography ==
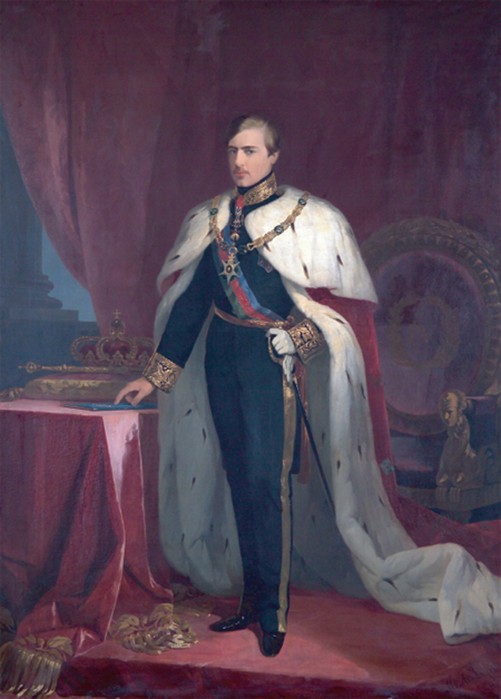
Portrait of King Pedro V

His father was an immigrant from Italy. He showed an early talent for art and was enrolled at the Lisbon Academy of Fine Arts in 1841, where he studied with António Manuel da Fonseca.

After graduating in 1848, he discovered that he could not support himself entirely by painting, as his parents had warned him, so he obtained a position at the "Imprensa Nacional" (the government printing office) as an assistant bookkeeper. He remained there, while continuing to paint, until 1851, when he was transferred to the Finance Board for what was then the Province of Angola, and lived in Luanda for two years.

In 1855, he was appointed "Aspirante de 2.ª Classe" (a civil service rank similar to officer candidate) for the Bureau of Finance in the Porto District, but never served because he quickly achieved the same rank for the Court of Auditors. In 1859, he was appointed Court Clerk. In that capacity, he was commissioned to paint a portrait of King Pedro V for use in the courtroom. The painting met with great approval and resulted in a state grant for him to continue his art studies in Italy. He was there from 1860 to 1863, taking lessons and copying the Old Masters.

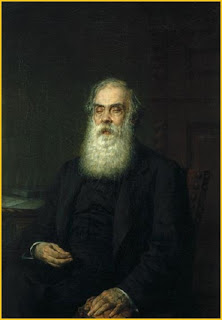
Portrait of António Feliciano de Castilho

When he returned, he presented himself as a candidate for the Chair of Historical Painting at the Lisbon Academy with a canvas depicting the Kiss of Judas. His application was provisionally accepted, and he became a teacher there in 1864. Three years later, he was placed in charge of inspecting the monument to King Pedro IV that was being created in Paris, and publishing an official report. Upon his return, he received the Chair he had originally sought, a position which included producing portraits of notable public figures. In 1879, he wrote a plan for improving the academy: A reforma da Academia Real de Bellas Artes de Lisboa, completed at the request of José Luciano de Castro, the Minister of Internal Administration.

He won several awards at the Exposition Universelle (1878), and a major retrospective of his work was held shortly after his death. A street in Lisbon has been named in his honour.
