= Silva Porto (painter) =

Portuguese painter (1850–1893)

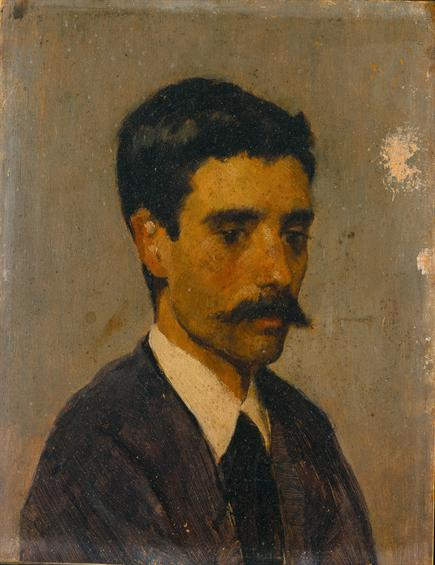
- Self-portrait, c.1873
- Born: António Carvalho da Silva; 11 November 1850; Porto, Portugal
- Died: 1 July 1893 (aged 42); Lisbon, Portugal
- Known for: Painting
- Notable work: Media related to Silva Porto at Wikimedia Commons
- Movement: Naturalism

António Carvalho da Silva (11 November 1850 – 1 June 1893), known as Silva Porto, was a Portuguese naturalist painter.

== Biography ==
Born in Porto, he studied there under João António Correia and Tadeu de Almeida Furtado, then continued his studies in Paris and Rome.

While in Paris he exhibited his work in the Salon and in the World's Fair of 1878. In Paris, he studied with his friend João Marques de Oliveira, where they were pupils of Adolphe Yvon and Alexandre Cabanel. They became followers of the naturalist Barbizon School, and brought the new school of painting to Portugal, when they returned in 1879.

Silva Porto become one of the most acclaimed naturalist painters of his generation, showing the heritage of Jean-Baptiste-Camille Corot and Charles-François Daubigny. Secondary effects from impressionism can sometimes be found in his paintings.

He died in 1893 in Lisbon. His work is represented at the Chiado Museum, in Lisbon, and at the National Museum Soares dos Reis, in Porto. The Soares dos Reis National Museum houses his No Areinho, Douro; Uma Marinha (Marine) ; Conduçao do rebanho (Driving the herd); Costume de Capri; The return of the market and Harvesters.

== Selected paintings ==
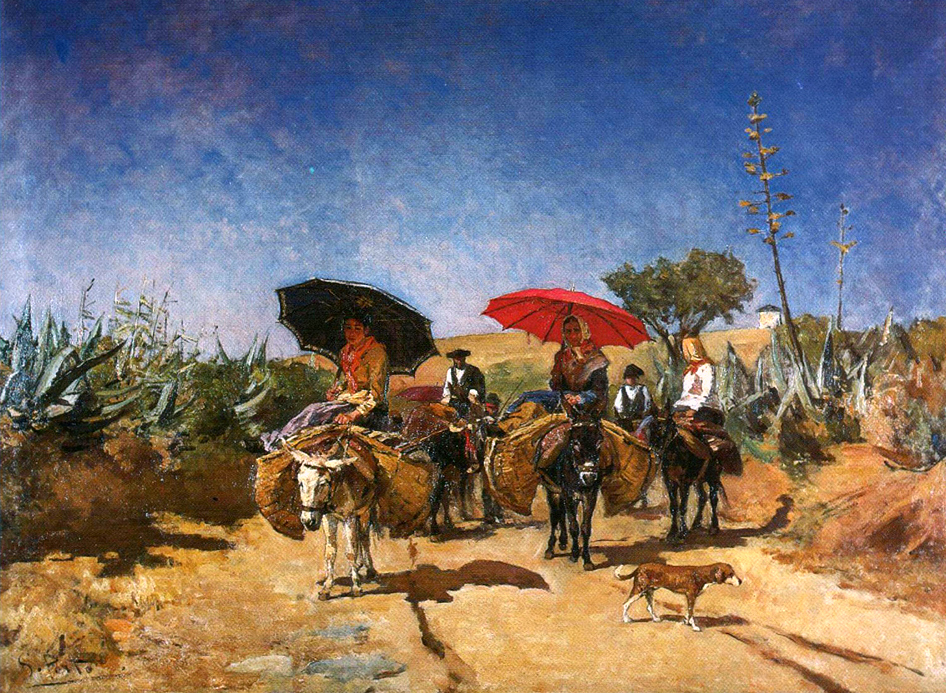
Going to Market, 1886

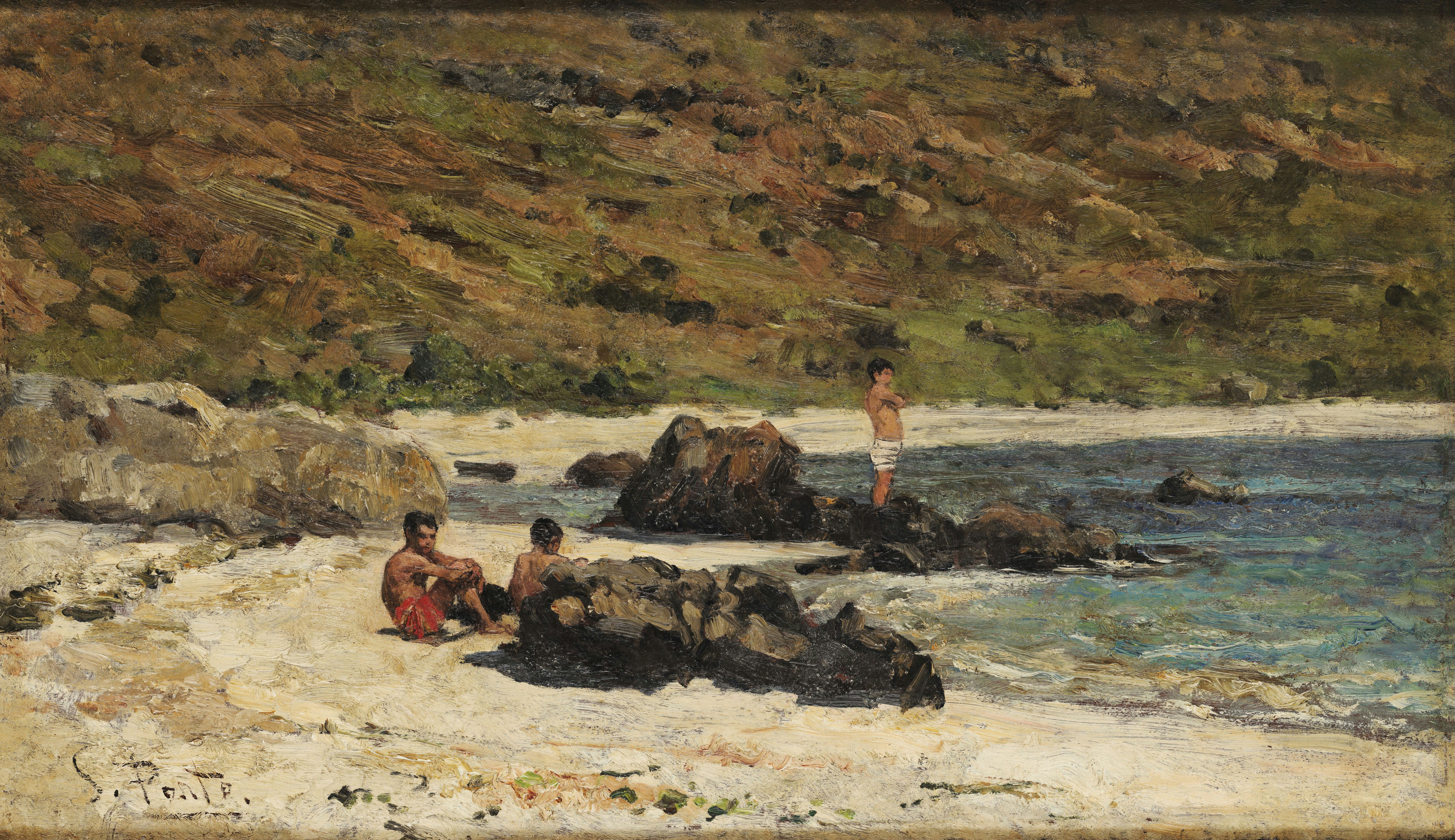
A Quiet Place on the Beach

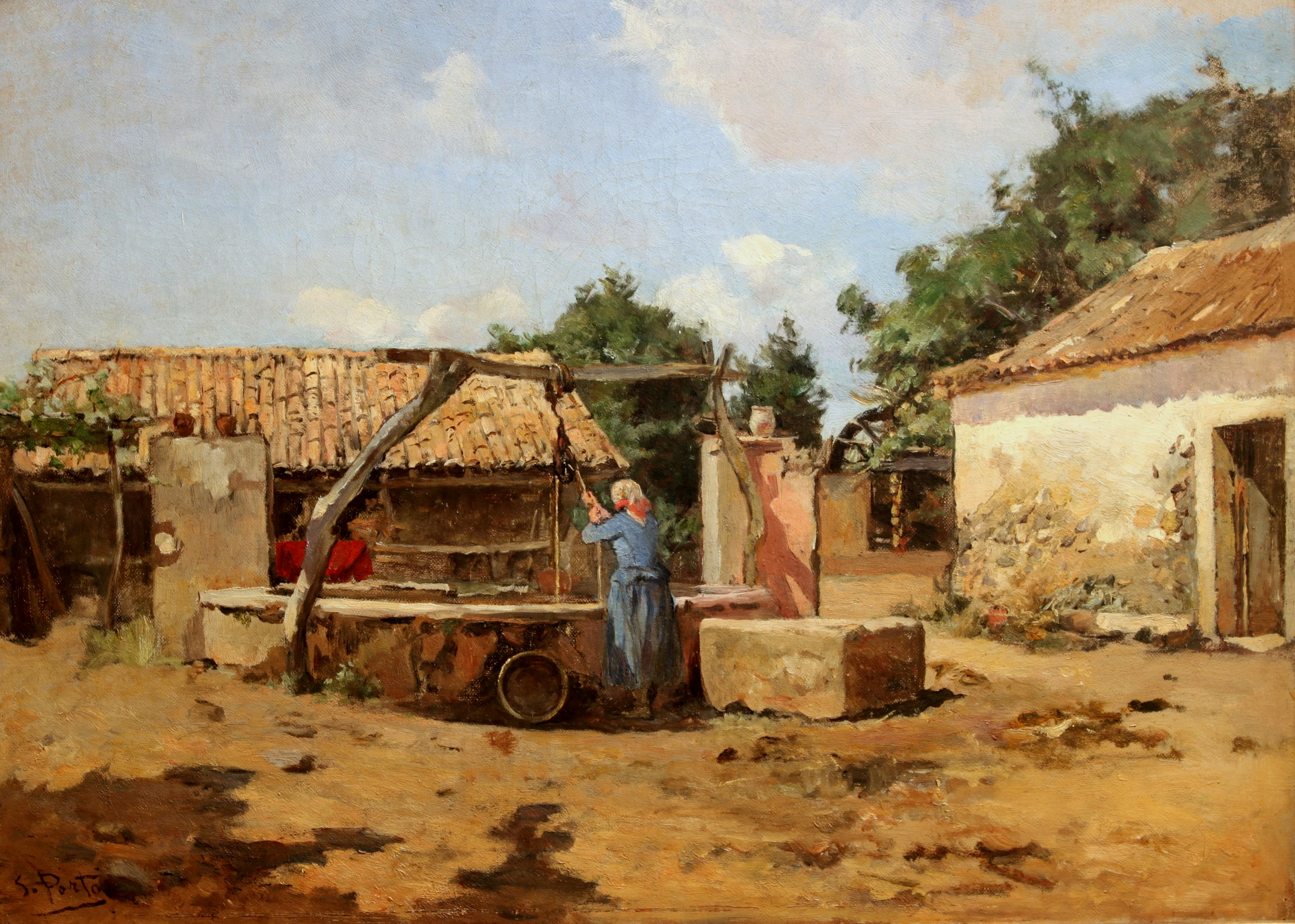
At the Well, oil on paper
