= Mily Possoz =

Portuguese modernist painter and engraver

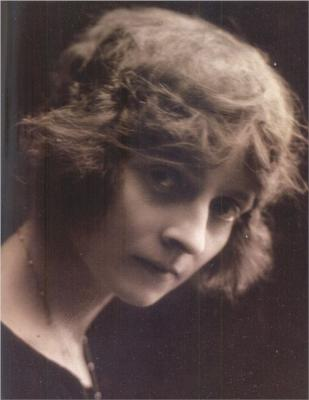
- Born: Emília Possoz; 4 December 1888; Lisbon, Portugal
- Died: 17 June 1968 (aged 79); Lisbon
- Occupation: Artist
- Years active: 60
- Known for: Modernist painting and engraving. Book illustrations

Emília "Mily" Possoz (1888 – 1968), was a Portuguese artist. She was one of the most prominent figures of the first generation of Portuguese modernist artists.

== Early life ==
Emilia Possoz was born on 4 December 1888, in the Portuguese capital of Lisbon, She was the daughter of Henri Émile Possoz (1856 – 1912), a former Belgian army artillery officer and chemical engineer, and Jeanne Anne Rosalie Leroy (1862 – 1937), both Belgian citizens, who were born in Antwerp and Liège, respectively and had married in London in early 1888. At this time Portugal was seeking to open eight technical schools to teach industrial education to train qualified technicians for factories in the same vicinity. Her parents moved to Portugal in 1888 when her father was asked to be a professor of Chemistry at the Industrial School situated in Caldas da Rainha in the Leiria District of Portugal, which was close to a ceramics factory managed by the artist Rafael Bordalo Pinheiro. They arrived in Lisbon on 2 December, just two days before Émilia's birth. She was not baptised until 8 June 1889, in the Parish Church of Caldas da Rainha.

After a few years the family moved to Lisbon, with her father taking a job as attorney and head of the maritime section in the firm Burnay & Cª, belonging to Henrique Burnay, the Second Count of Burnay, who had become very rich and eventually turned his company into the Burnay Bank. Mily and her sister Jeanne entered the Lisbon German School. After some years of difficulty the school reopened its doors in 1895, when it is likely the two sisters joined. Both had an oral command of the German language as their mother spoke German to them at home. Her father was later to be appointed Chancellor of the Consulate General of Belgium in Lisbon. Well-integrated with the small Belgian community in Lisbon and with the wider Lisbon society, the family got to know artists and other well-known figures, such as the painter Alfredo Roque Gameiro, and the pianists José Vianna da Motta and Alexandre Rey Colaço. Mily Possoz became particularly friendly with Colaço’s daughter, Alice, who also became an artist.

Like the daughters of all upper-middle-class families, the two sisters learned to play the piano. They were students of Alexandre Rey Colaço, who was also the teacher of the royal family. They became known for the entertainment they provided to visitors to the family house. During the summers the sisters and their mother returned to Belgium while their father continued to work in Lisbon. Their exposure to the arts continued as their paternal grandfather was a graduate of the Royal Conservatory of Brussels, where he was a professor. One of his brothers was an engraver by profession and her paternal grandmother was an amateur artist.

== Early art training ==
While still young, Possoz started attending the studios of watercolor artist Enrique Casanova (1850 – 1913), a Spanish naturalist painter and teacher of the Portuguese royal family, and of painter Emília dos Santos Braga (1867 – 1949), a disciple of José Malhoa and a painter who specialised in nudes, much to the horror of the Lisbon middle classes. Braga ran a school of painting, from which Possoz and Maria Helena Vieira da Silva (1908–1992) emerged as her two most famous students. It was with Braga that Possoz first experimented with oil painting.

When his daughter was 16, her father contacted the French painter, Ernest Bordes, who had also done work for the Portuguese Royal Family, asking for advice on his daughter's work. The response was very positive, encouraging her father to allow her to continue her artistic training in Paris, where she attended the Académie de la Grande Chaumière in Montparnasse, a school which aimed to teach art free from the restrictions of an academic education. During her stay she became a student of one of the founders of the Academy, Lucien Simon, and of Émile-René Ménard, and met artists such as the Portuguese artists Manuel Jardim and Eduardo Viana, who Possoz became engaged to in 1919, as well as Amedeo Modigliani. She began to explore new techniques and to take an interest in new avant-garde artistic movements. Unfortunately, her enjoyment of the bohemian Parisian life proved too much for her tolerant parents and she was recalled home in 1908. Possoz later went to Düsseldorf, Germany, where she took private lessons on engraving and lithography with Willy Spatz and also traveled through Belgium, Italy and Holland.

== Early exhibits ==
Returning to Portugal, Possoz divided her time between the Lapa part of Lisbon, almost always in the company of her sister Jeanne and her friend Alice Rey Colaço, and the family home in Estoril. Her father died in 1912. After the overthrow of the monarchy and rebelling against the conservatism of Portuguese society and its conventional approach to art, she joined the emerging modernist movement in Portugal. She started to exhibit at the Sociedade Nacional de Belas Artes (Society of Fine Arts) in 1909 and rapidly became known, being a regular exhibitor at the Society's annual salons until 1916. She would also exhibit at the Humourist and Modernist Exhibitions from 1913 to 1926, along with José de Almada Negreiros and others. She was one of the few female artists of her generation to organize individual exhibitions of her work, in oil painting, pencil drawing, gouache or watercolour. Invited to participate she was the only female exhibiting in the 2nd Exhibition of Humourists, in 1913, and in the Exhibition of the "Five Independents" in 1923. In a male-dominated society, Possoz was regarded as an equal by her fellow artists.

== World War I and after ==
There was a thriving community of artists in Lisbon during and immediately after World War I. Central to the group were Robert and Sonia Delaunay, who had lived in Paris but were in Spain when war broke out, decided not to return and moved to Lisbon. Others, apart from Possoz, were Sarah Affonso, Almada Negreiros, Helena Viera da Silva, Abel Manta, Clementina Carneiro de Moura, Fernanda de Castro, Estrela Faria and António Soares. In 1922, many of these took up residence in Paris. Possoz paid frequent visits but appears not to have lived permanently in Paris again until 1927.

During her visits to France, Possoz became an active member and only female partner of the society Jeune Gravure Contemporaine (Young Contemporary Engraving), which staged annual shows and was influential in keeping the spirit of printmaking alive. She exhibited at museums and galleries and became friends with the Japanese artist Tsuguharu Foujita, with whom she collaborated on some of his lithographs. In Brussels, she exhibited with Gravure Original Belge. In 1922, Possoz was rejected for exhibition by the Portuguese Sociedade Nacional de Belas Artes, due to her criticism of the conservatism and artistic backwardness of the Portuguese artistic society, a rejection that the newspaper Diário de Notícias considered to be "an injustice and a scandal". Outraged, Eduardo Viana, who had never been refused to exhibit, decided to organize an exhibition for modernist artists in 1925, borrowing the name of Autumn Salon from a similar exhibition in Paris. Possoz exhibited several works. In 1926, Viana ended the engagement and left for Brussels. They resumed the relationship two years later but separated again in 1930.

Possoz settled in Paris from 1927 to 1937, occasionally visiting Portugal to exhibit or visit family members. The decision to stay in Paris may have been due to an invitation by the French poet, writer and essayist Valery Larbaud to illustrate one of his books. It appears that most of her work during this period involved book illustrations and that she also obtained income from the sale of prints. Her financial situation was precarious. In 1937 she participated in the Exposition Internationale des Arts et Techniques dans la Vie Moderne (International Exposition of Art and Technology in Modern Life) in Paris and won a Gold Medal for engraving, and in the same year exhibited at the French Printmaking Exhibition, held in Cleveland, United States, which led to several of her works being purchased by the Cleveland Museum of Art.

== Book illustrations ==
With the loss of her father's income, Possoz had to produce an income from her art. This was mainly achieved by commercial work rather than by selling her paintings. An excellent designer, Possoz collaborated with Jorge Barradas and Alice Rey Colaço as a poster and stage designer for the play Zilda by Alfredo Cortez (1921), and as an illustrator in numerous publications, such as the magazines ABC, Athena, Contemporânea, Diário de Lisboa, and A Civilização, using woodcutting, lithography, watercolour, etching and drypoint techniques. She also illustrated short stories and novels, such as O Jardim das Mestras (1914) by Manoel de Sousa Pinto, The Adventures of Felício and Felizarda at the North Pole (1922) by Ana de Castro Osório, As Bonecas (1923) by Jane Bensaude, The roses of the baby Jesus (1923) by Maria Benedita Moutinho de Albuquerque Pinho, Theatro para Creanças (1923) by Maria Paula Azevedo and a re-issue of Prosper Mérimée’s La Carrosse du Saint Sacrement (1928).

== Return to Portugal ==
Returning to Portugal after the death of her mother in 1937, Possoz lived in Sintra. In 1940 she was among many modernist artists invited by the architect Cottinelli Telmo to decorate the pavilions of the Portuguese World Exhibition (Exposição do Mundo Português), which was held in Lisbon in 1940 to mark 800 years since the foundation of the country and 300 years since the restoration of independence from Spain. She was asked to design the Japan Room and her work was inspired by Namban art. During that same decade, she became friends with the Catalan painter and designer Ramon Rogent i Perés, and dedicated herself mainly to oil and watercolour painting. She also collaborated occasionally with the magazine Panorama and designed costumes for a ballet. She also participated in several exhibitions of Modern Art. In 1944 she received the Amadeo de Souza Cardoso Award, in 1949 the José Tagarro Drawing Prize and in 1951 the Columbano Prize.

In the 1950s and 1960s, at the invitation of her neighbour and friend Bartolomeu Cid dos Santos, Possoz began to collaborate with the Sociedade Cooperativa de Gravadores Portugueses, of which she remained a member until her death. She began to give private lessons in painting and continued to illustrate books such as Bom Dia Tristeza (1954) by Françoise Sagan and Mascarados and popular masks of Trás-os-Montes (1960) by Sebastião Pessanha. She held her third solo exhibition, exhibited in the city council buildings of Sintra and Almada and also supported young artists to exhibit for the first time in different spaces.

== Death and legacy ==
Mily Possoz died on 17 June 1968 in Lisbon, at her sister's house. In 1969 the first retrospective exhibition was held in her honour at the exhibition space of the Sociedade Cooperativa de Gravadores Portugueses, in Lisbon. Despite her considerable work employing a variety of different techniques, and her international reputation, she is probably best-known in Portugal for a school book she illustrated in 1958 called Livro da segunda classe, which had a profound impact on students for many years.

Her work can be found in the Calouste Gulbenkian Museum in Lisbon, the National Museum of Contemporary Art in Chiado, Lisbon, the National Gallery of London and the Cleveland Museum, among others. In Portugal she has two roads named after her, in the municipalities of Cascais and Seixal.
