= Bristol Club =

Nightclub in Lisbon, Portugal (1918–1928)

Coordinates: 38°42′56.4″N 9°08′25″W

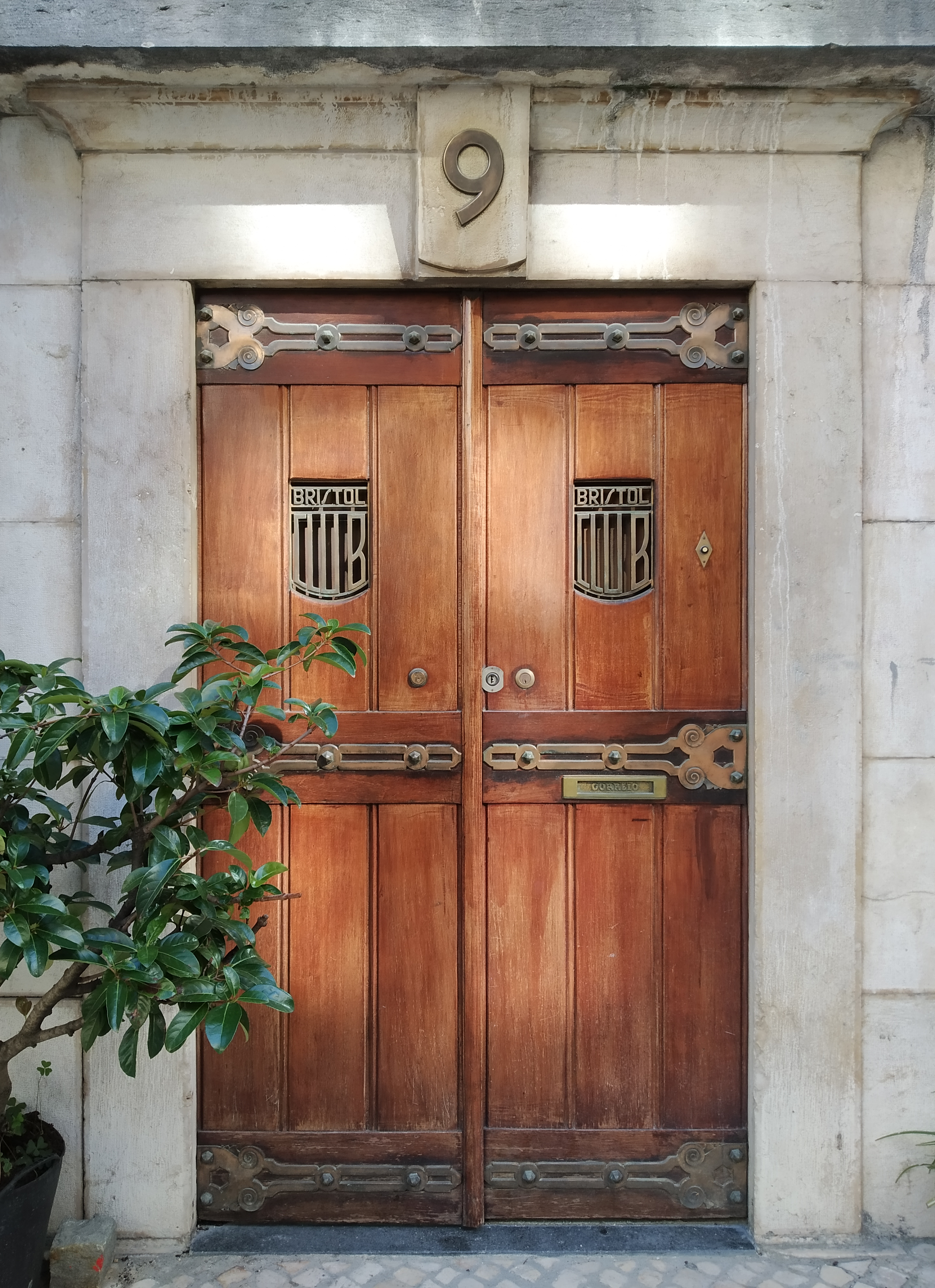
The front door of the former Bristol Club in 2002

The Bristol Club was a nightclub in the Portuguese capital, Lisbon. It was particularly noted for the modern architecture and artwork that was introduced to the club in the 1920s.

== Description ==
The Bristol Club was situated at 9, Rua Jardim do Regedor, in the centre of Lisbon. Following other nightclub openings, businessman Mário Freitas Ribeiro decided in 1917 to open a club in a large building that was close to several other similar clubs. Opened on 11 March 1918, it quickly became known for its decorative beauty, with paintings by Gabriel Constante, but in 1920 Ribeiro planned to expand the property by two floors. Although the planning request was speedily granted, no changes had been made by 1923, by which time only one additional floor was planned. Initial changes were made in 1924 under the architect Raúl Martins, and the same architect was involved with the expansion of the club in 1925, with the first and second floors being converted to house the "Bristol Restaurant-Concert Hall", and further changes being made to the floors above. Frequented exclusively by wealthy individuals, nightclubs sometimes witnessed attempted burglaries. In April 1925 the Bristol received a visit from the terrorist organization Red Legion. One member of the group was killed and the doorman was injured.

In January 1926, construction continued with another architect, the modernist, Carlos João Chambers Ramos, who proposed an innovative structure, both inside and out, to give the building a modern look without demolishing it. However, the project never came to fruition, despite being approved by Lisbon City Council. Instead, Ramos carried out interior renovation and decoration work in 1926 and 1927. He designed the revolving entrance door, made of wood and metal; a new staircase with marble walls and metal tube handrails; and two doors that provided access from the staircase to private areas. The combination of wood and metal evoked a ship's interior, thus justifying the club's name, with reference to the English shipping port of Bristol. The club's staff also wore uniforms reflecting the maritime theme.

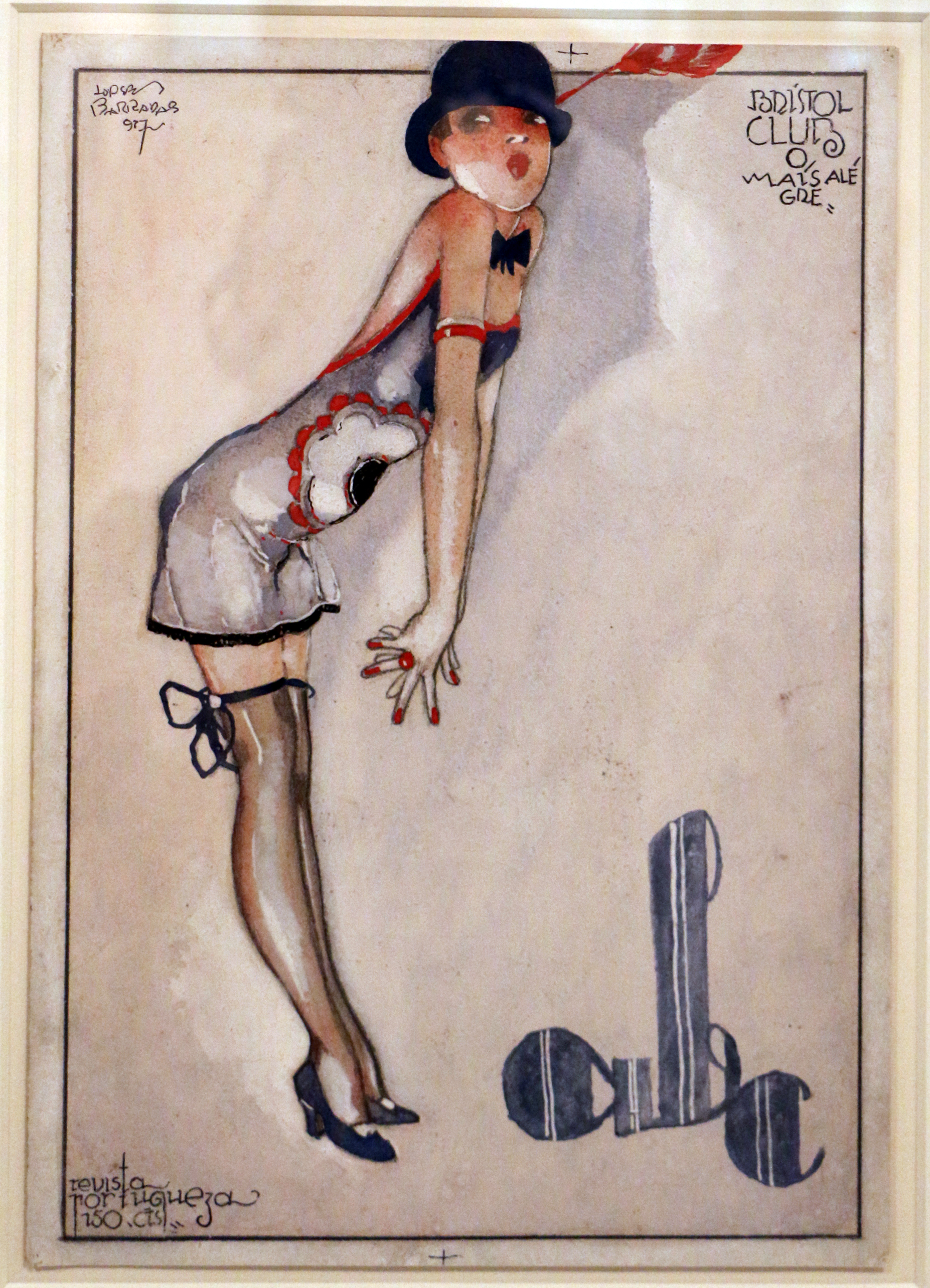
Advertisement for the club by Jorge Barradas

Ribeiro wanted his club to have a modern and cosmopolitan atmosphere. He therefore asked several young modernist artists to create the new décor, including painters Almada Negreiros, Eduardo Viana, António Soares, Jorge Barradas, Lino António, the English artist Francis Smith, and Guilherme Filipe and sculptors Ernesto Canto da Maia and Leopoldo de Almeida. Barradas, together with Emmerico Nunes, were major contributors to sensual advertisements for the club, often involving young women striking languid poses and feigning modesty, that appeared in magazines such as ABC and Contemporânea. In the main room, which served as a restaurant and dance hall, there was a nude commissioned from Negreiros and a series of nudes by Viana. These works are now in the Calouste Gulbenkian Foundation's Modern Art Centre (CAM). All emphasised the desired atmosphere of the club, a mix of modernity and sensuality. Other works showed Art Deco influences. Some of the artists had already participated in the decoration of the Café A Brasileira in Lisbon in 1925, another example of Portuguese modernism, which can still be visited. The atmosphere of the club was further enhanced by use of coloured electric lighting.

== Closure ==
The club became known for its jazz bands, dancing, high-level prostitution, gambling and cocaine use. More sedate was the billiards room on the top floor. However, the illegal activities carried out there led to its closure in 1928 by the military dictatorship; the building being then occupied by the Casanova nightclub and, later, by Sport Lisboa e Benfica, one of Portugal's leading football teams.
