= Francis Smith (artist) =

Portuguese and French painter (1881–1961)

- Born: Francisco Smith; 10 October 1881; Lisbon, Portugal
- Died: 3 December 1961 (aged 80); Paris, France
- Known for: Painting
- Movement: Fauvism; Cubism; Surrealism; Figurative art

Francis Smith or Francisco Smith (1881 –1961) was a Portuguese and, later, French painter.

== Early life ==
Of English origin on his father's side and Portuguese on his mother's, Smith was born in the Portuguese capital of Lisbon on 10 October 1881. He grew up in a wealthy family, his father, William Smith, being an industrialist. His mother, D. Maria Adelaide de Magalhães e Meneses, was a cultured woman with a keen interest in art. He attended the Pedro Nunes High School in Lisbon, where he first revealed his talent for drawing. He studied at the Royal Academy of Fine Arts in Lisbon under José Ribeiro Júnior, Luciano Freire and Constantino Fernandes, but quickly distanced himself from traditional academic education in the arts.

== Move to Paris ==
In 1907, he settled in Paris, where he studied with other Portuguese artists, such as Eduardo Viana, Emmerico Nunes and Amadeo de Souza-Cardoso at the Académie Julian under Jean-Paul Laurens. Among others, he became a friend of Marcel Proust. From then until his death, he rarely returned to Portugal, living in part on a pension from his father.

He exhibited in Portugal at the 1911 Exposições de Humoristas e Modernistas, considered a landmark in the development of Portuguese art, and in 1916 at the Galeria de Artes. In 1925 he exhibited at the First Autumn Salon of the National Society of Fine Arts in Lisbon, organized by Viana, and two years later contributed to the decoration of the modernist Bristol Club nightclub in Lisbon. He held an individual show in 1934 at the Salão Bobone in Lisbon but from that year he did not return to Portugal, even though his wife, the sculptor Yvonne Mortier, was a Jew, and they were forced to flee Paris for the south of France when Germany invaded in 1940. He had taken French nationality when they married and, at that time, shortened his name to Francis.

His work has been divided into three phases. In his early phase (1907–1914), he was influenced by Fauvism and by Henri Matisse. His middle phase (1914–1925) was a period of experimentation with Cubism and Surrealism, while from 1925 until his death he followed a more figurative art style, focusing on landscapes and still lifes. Much of his work explored memories of childhood places. It was sometimes compared with that of Maurice Utrillo, although in his art he remained faithful to his memories of Portugal, particularly of Lisbon. He rarely held solo exhibitions in Paris but is known to have exhibited at the Berthe Weill, Collete Weill, Charpentier, Drouet, and Marcel Bernheim galleries. From 1930 he contributed to the salon of the Société des Artistes Indépendants, the Salon des Tuileries, and other group exhibitions. He was commissioned by the Portuguese government to paint a large painting on the Algarve for the 1937 Exposition Internationale des Arts et Techniques dans la Vie Moderne in Paris.

== Death ==
Smith died on 3 December 1961. An exhibition to celebrate his 80th birthday had been planned by a group called "Les amis de Francis Smith" (The friends of Francis Smith) but he died before it could be held. After his death, the Portuguese Secretariado Nacional de Informação organised a retrospective exhibition of his work in 1967 in Lisbon and, two years later, the Calouste Gulbenkian Foundation organized an exhibition in Paris called Le Portugal dans l'oeuvre de Francis Smith (Portugal in the work of Francis Smith). His paintings were also featured in major exhibitions of Portuguese art, including a travelling exhibition, Art Portugais, that visited Brussels, Paris, and Madrid in 1967 and 1968. He is represented at the National Museum of Contemporary Art of Chiado and the Calouste Gulbenkian Foundation Modern Art Centre (CAM), both in Lisbon, and in other public and private collections. A new retrospective was held at the Chiado museum in 2022, called Francis Smith. In Search of Lost Time.

In 2024, a committee comprising members of the painter's family and art historians began compiling a catalogue raisonné of the artist's artwork.
