= Portuguese Woman =

Painting by Robert Delaunay

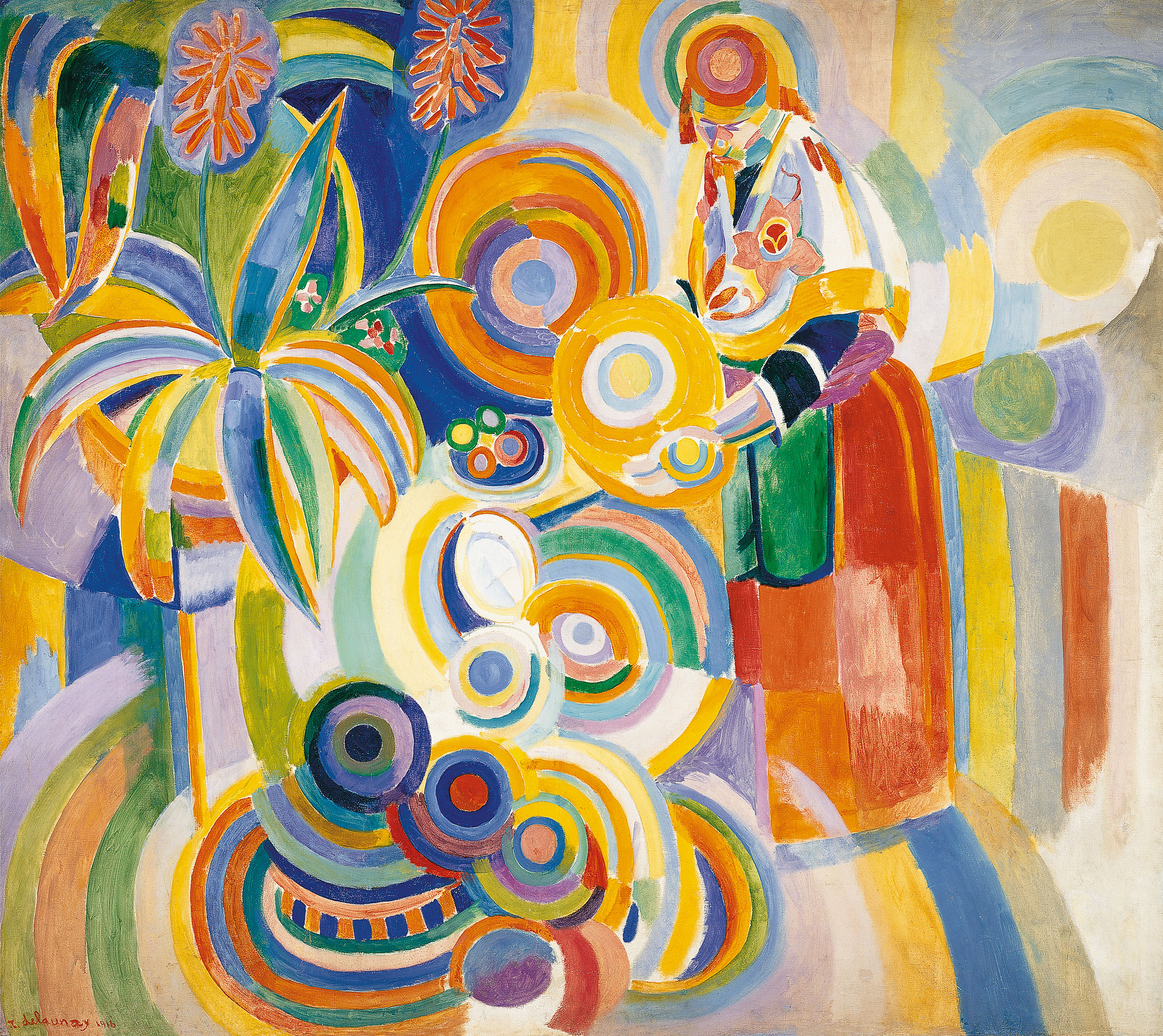
- Artist: Robert Delaunay
- Year: 1916
- Medium: oil and wax on canvas
- Dimensions: 180 cm × 205 cm (71 in × 81 in)
- Location: Thyssen-Bornemisza Museum, Madrid

Portuguese Woman, also known as Tall Portuguese Woman, is an oil and wax on canvas painting by the French painter Robert Delaunay, created in 1916. It is held in the Thyssen-Bornemisza Museum, in Madrid. There are others similarly named paintings by the same artist from this phase, in other museums.

== History and description ==
Robert and Sonia Delaunay where at the resort of San Sebastián, in Spain, when the First World War overtook them by surprise. They remained in Spain, staying for some months in Madrid. They decided to move to Portugal, settling in the northern village of Vila do Conde, near Porto, where they lived from June 1915 to March 1916. The Delaunays were captivated by the warm, clear light of northern Portugal. They were influence by that kind of lightning and by scenes of popular life, which they tried to capture in a series of works on the theme of village markets. Although Robert Delaunay had already experimented with abstract painting before, in 1912–1913, unlike other artists, such as Wassily Kandinsky, he did not see it as an end in itself but as part of his orphic style. They also came into contact with Portuguese painters like Amadeo de Souza Cardoso and Eduardo Viana, who were also influenced by their work.

In this painting, the colourful composition is enhanced by the combination of figurative and abstract elements. Delaunay reached a color saturation in this painting with the usage of an oil and wax mixture, which he would never use again after leaving Portugal. A Portuguese woman, dressed in traditional clothing of north Portugal, appears at the right, while she seems to be carrying a piece of pottery. She is dressed in a very colourful manner and the orphic circles are seen at the center of the composition, spreading their colours in the canvas. Some colourful plants are also visible at the left.
