= Contemporânea =

Portuguese magazine

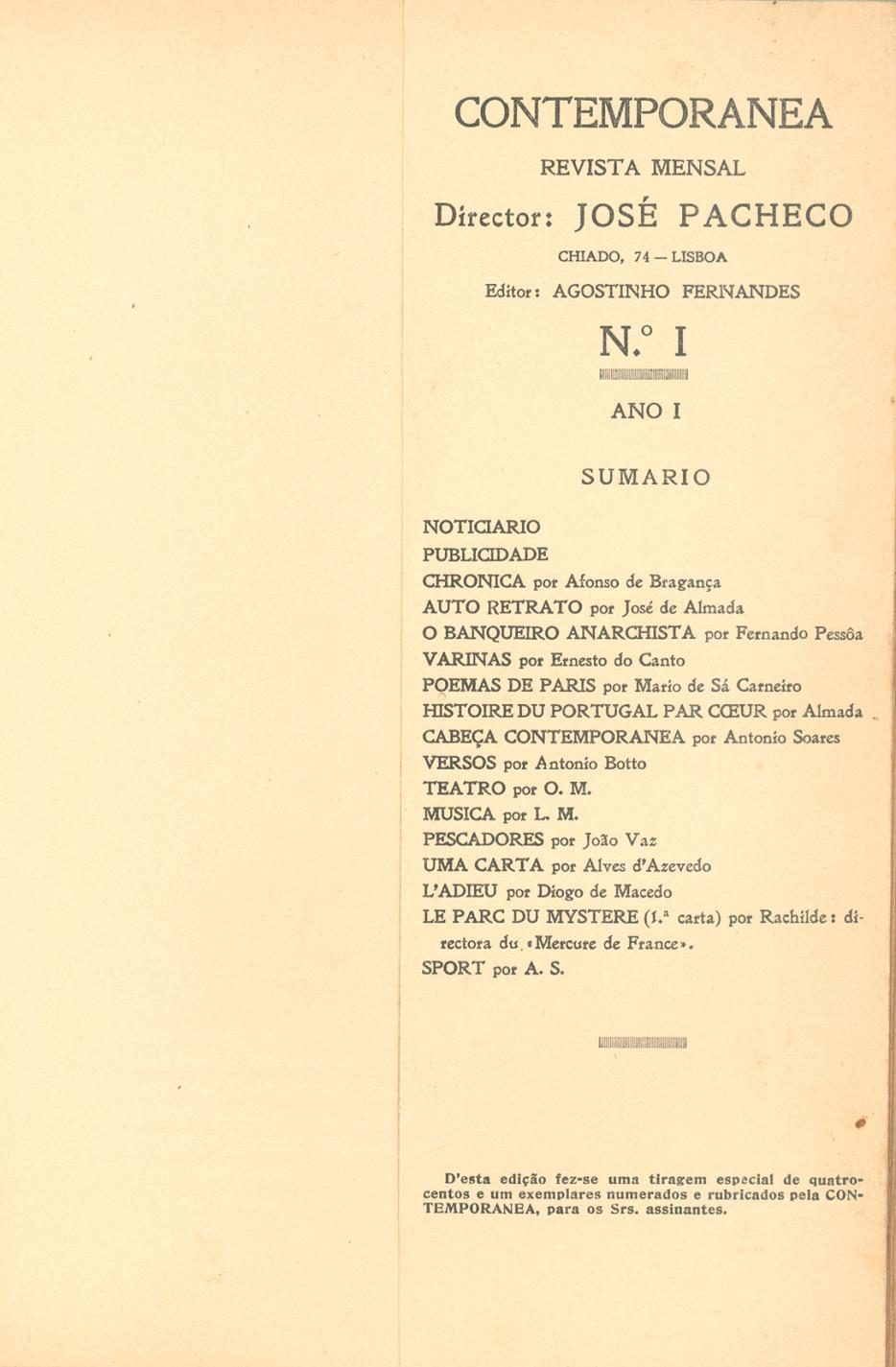
- First issue of Contemporânea of May 1922
- Staff writers: José Pacheko
- Categories: Review
- Founded: 1922
- Final issue: 1926
- Country: Portugal
- Based in: Lisbon
- Language: Portuguese

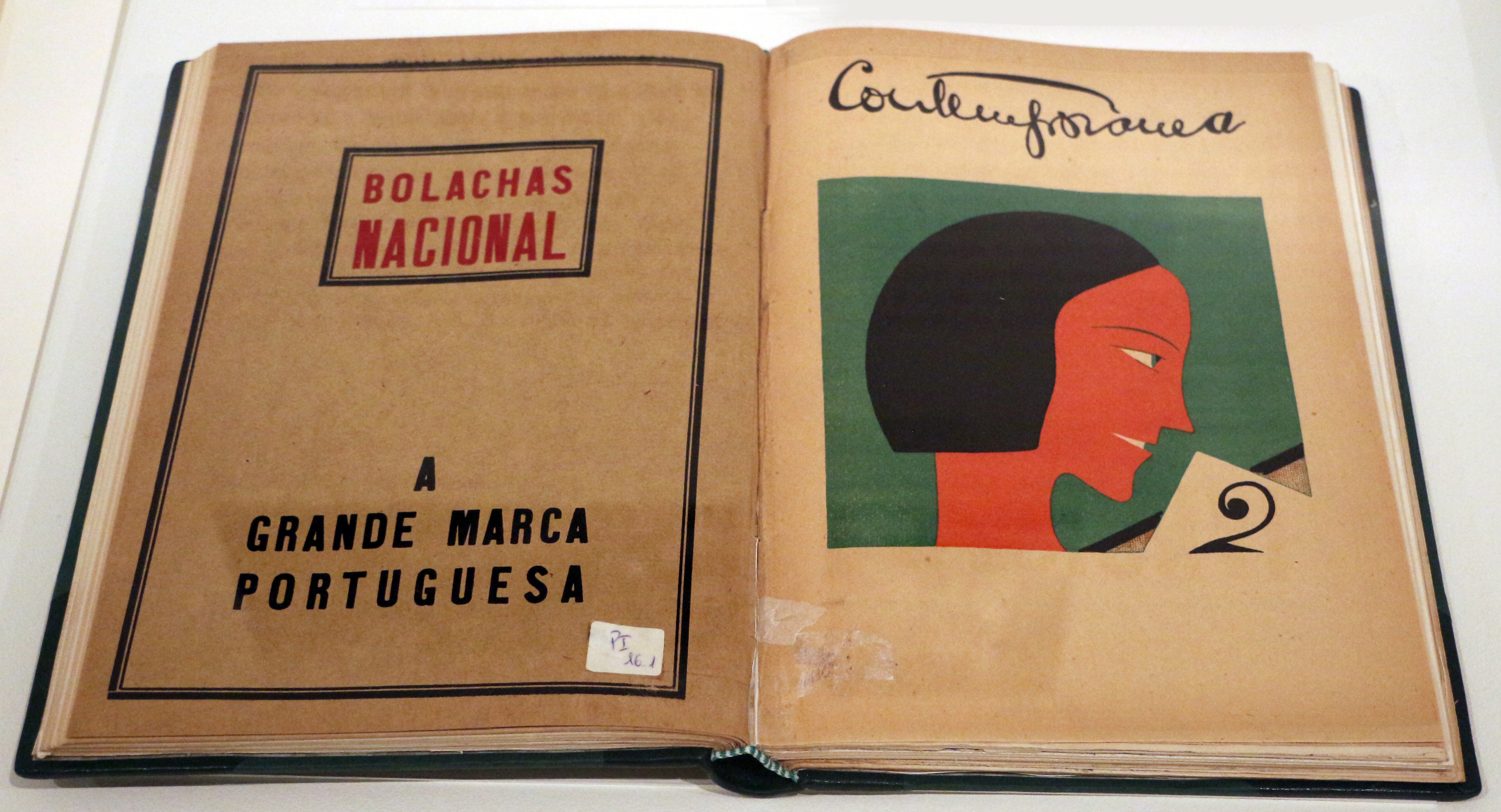
Front page by José de Almada Negreiros, 1922

Contemporânea (Portuguese for "Contemporary") was a Portuguese review magazine published in Lisbon from 1922 until 1926.

It was headed by José Pacheko and had saved the graphic heading, it brought a literary direction secured for the main drafter Oliveira Mouta, which presented in 1915, attracted a number specimen, but only became viable in a part of May 1922 due to the support of the industrialist and collector Agostinho Fernandes (1886-1972), which later became the review's editor.

The project had as the target of the titles In Contemporânea crystallized the modernism in the 1920s and you taste something mundane, its political tendency of the right. Its publications totalled three numbers and the review turned it into a point of support by many "new" artists, which reprinted profusely.

Its numerous contributors included:

- Fernando Pessoa
- Almada Negreiros
- Mário de Sá Carneiro
- Eduardo Viana
- Diogo de Macedo
- Mário Saa
- Oliveira Mouta
- António Ferro
- Ernesto do Canto
- António Botto
- Raul Leal
- Aquilino Ribeiro
- António Soares
- Mily Possoz
- Stuart Carvalhais
- Manuel Jardim
- Luís de Montalvor
- Jorge Barradas
- Sculptor Francisco Franco
- Henrique Franco
- Dordio Gomes
- Amadeo de Souza-Cardoso
- Alfredo Pimenta
- João Vaz
- Fortunato Velez

The review was associated with the artist school which styled Café A Brasileira and Bristol Club in Lisbon, and the Fall (Autumn) Salon at the National Society of Fine Arts in 1926.

== See also ==
- List of publications at the Hemeroteca Municipal de Lisboa
