= Manuel Jardim =

Portuguese painter

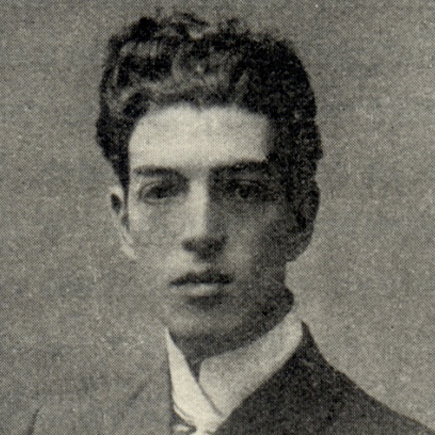
Manuel Jardim (1906)

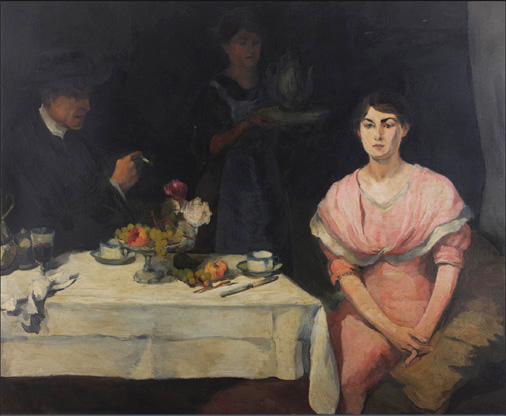
Breakfast (1911)

Manuel de Azambuja Leite Pereira Jardim (6 November 1884, Montemor-o-Velho – 7 June 1923, Lisbon) was a Portuguese painter and art teacher.

== Biography ==
He was born to an aristocratically inclined bourgeois family from Coimbra and studied at the "Escola de Belas-Artes" (now part of the University of Lisbon) from 1903 to 1905, then went to Paris with Manuel Bentes and Eduardo Viana.

He studied at the Académie Julian with Jean-Paul Laurens, where he was influenced by the works of Eugène Carrière and Édouard Manet. In 1911, he had his first showing at the Salon with his painting "Le Déjeuner" (Breakfast). During this time, he also made trips to Germany, Italy and Spain. Upon returning, he held a major exhibition at the Salon d’Automne.

He went back to Portugal in 1914 and opened his own art school in Coimbra. While there, he joined with the architect José Pacheko in an effort to establish a "Sociedade Portuguesa de Arte Moderna", but was unsuccessful. In 1920, he was in Paris again, but remained for only a year and returned home after he was diagnosed with tuberculosis. He died two years later.

In addition to his painting, he provided illustrations for the magazines Contemporânea and Serões. In 1925, his friend Viana honored him with a major retrospective at the "Sociedade Nacional de Belas-Artes", along with works by Amadeo de Souza-Cardoso and Santa-Rita Pintor; two other painters who died young. Further exhibitions were held in 1974 and 2011. Most of his works have been in the possession of the Museu Nacional de Machado de Castro since 1952.
