= Cristiano Cruz =

Portuguese artist and vet (1892–1951)

- Born: 6 May 1892; Leiria, Portugal
- Died: 21 October 1951 (aged 59); Silva Porto, Angola
- Other names: Christiano Alfredo Shepard Cruz; Cristiano Sheppard Cruz; Christiano Cruz
- Occupations: Veterinarian and artist
- Years active: 1909–1919 (as an artist)

Cristiano Cruz (6 May 1892 – 21 October 1951) was a veterinarian, painter, illustrator, and caricaturist who was part of the first generation of Portuguese modernism. His innovative artistic career was brief but influential, beginning roughly in 1909 and ending abruptly in 1919, when he decided to leave for Portuguese Mozambique and abandon art to dedicate himself exclusively to veterinary medicine.

== Early life ==
Cruz was born in Leiria on 6 May 1892. He was the son of Alfredo Eduardo Cruz and Berta Sheppard. The British surname of his mother caused some confusion about his full name, as did the spelling of his first name. He was variously known as Christiano Alfredo Shepard Cruz, Cristiano Sheppard Cruz, Cristiano Cruz or Christiano Cruz. His family were republicans. Without artistic training, he relied on drawings in newspapers and magazines to provide his knowledge of artistic techniques. Initially, his work revealed considerable humour and social criticism but he would later partly distance himself from this attitude, stating, in a May 1914 interview, "Let's not criticize, let's make art".

== Career ==
His early works date from 1909, when he was living in Coimbra. The following year, he moved to the Portuguese capital, Lisbon, to study veterinary medicine. He then joined the group that founded the Society of Portuguese Humourists, which included, among others, Stuart Carvalhais, Jorge Barradas, José Pacheko, and Almada Negreiros. Cruz participated in the Humourists' Salons of 1912 and 1913 in Lisbon, receiving a very positive reception from the press and his work was featured on the cover of the catalogue of the 1913 Salon. Through his search for a type of "impersonal caricature" he sought to overcome the stereotypes of social and customary caricature, in the process influencing others, including Negreiros. He contributed to several periodicals, notably the magazines Sátira (1911), A Bomba (1912), and A Farça (1909-1910).

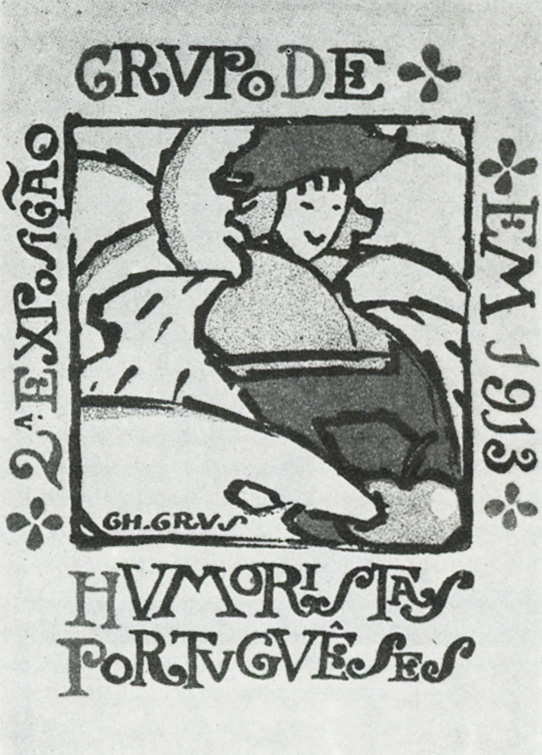
Cover by Cruz of the 1913 Humourists' Salon catalogue

From 1913 his style evolved, becoming more expressive, paving the way for the final phase of his work. In 1915, he began experimenting with painting in small-format works, further questioning his initial rigid and ascetic drawing to discover the potential of expressionism, in which colour played a fundamental role. He participated with nine of these works in the First Exhibition of Humourists and Modernists in Porto, but the critical reception was less favourable than it had been in Lisbon. For the following year's exhibition, he sent just a single work.

In 1917, Cruz joined the Portuguese Expeditionary Corps fighting in World War One. He created a series of works thematically linked to the war. Together with Diogo de Macedo he illustrated a book by Augusto Casimiro called Nas Trincheiras da Flandres (In the Trenches in Flanders). From 1918 he further developed his approach, which was considered advanced for the time. Always limited to small formats, these works were his most important contribution to the expressionist movement. However, fed up with the repetition of cartoon graphics and critically unpopular painting, Cruz suddenly left for Mozambique in 1919. The following year, he still submitted works to the Humourists' Exhibition but after this he dedicated himself exclusively to veterinary medicine.

== Death ==
Cruz died in Silva Porto, Angola on 21 October 1951.

A retrospective of his work was held in 1993 at the Rafael Bordalo Pinheiro Museum in Lisbon. Among others, his work is held by the Museu Nacional de Arte Contemporânea do Chiado and the Gulbenkian Centro de Arte Moderna, both in Lisbon.
