= Stuart Carvalhais =

Portuguese modernist artist (1887–1961)

- Born: José Herculano Stuart Torrie de Almeida Carvalhais; 7 July 1887; Vila Real, Portugal
- Died: 2 July 1961 (aged 73); Lisbon, Portugal
- Known for: Illustration; Cartoon strips; Scenic design
- Movement: Modernist

José Herculano Stuart Torrie de Almeida Carvalhais (1887–1961), better known as Stuart Carvalhais, was a multifaceted Portuguese modernist artist. He made his career as a painter, draftsman, illustrator, caricaturist, comic-book author, and graphic artist, but he also involved himself with photography, decoration, set design, and even cinema. He was the founder of Portugal's longest-running strip cartoon.

== Early life ==
Carvalhais was born on 7 March 1887, and baptised three days later, in the parish of São Pedro in the municipality of Vila Real in the north of Portugal. He was the son of Margarida Amélia Stuart Torrie, of Scottish and English descent, and José Joaquim de Almeida Carvalhais, a civil servant from a wealthy rural family in nearby Santa Marta de Penaguião, who also contributed humorous pieces to a magazine in Porto. He spent his early childhood in Spain, returning to Portugal in 1891. Between 1901 and 1903 he attended the Royal Institute of Lisbon, which was the first Portuguese institution to offer free secondary, special, and higher education courses, eventually providing more than 50 classes, taught free of charge by renowned professors. He then worked as a tile painter in the studio of the artist Jorge Colaço. Carvalhais was largely self-taught in artistic matters.

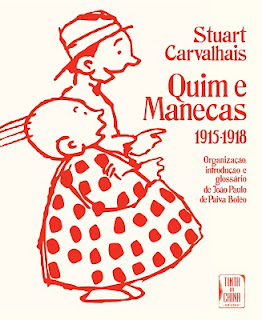
Cover of the first collection of Quim e Manecas cartoon strips

== Career ==
Carvalhais began to work as a newspaper artist in 1906, publishing his first designs in the comic supplement of the newspaper O Século in that year. In the same newspaper, he made his first attempts at a comic strip, called Triste História de Zé Alonso (The sad story of Zé Alonso). The following year, he began working for comic magazines, producing humorous drawings and caricatures. In 1911, he was one of the people responsible for the establishment of the humorous magazine A Sátira. He collaborated in the founding of the Society of Portuguese Humourists, whose president was Manuel Gustavo Bordalo Pinheiro, participating in exhibitions organized by this group in 1912 and 1913, the First and Second Exhibitions of Portuguese Humourists, along with Cristiano Cruz, Jorge Barradas, Emmerico Nunes, and Almada Negreiros, among others.

In 1912–13, he spent a few months in Paris, surviving precariously and contributing as an illustrator for the magazines Gil Blas, Le Rire, Le Sourire and Pages Folles. He became a partner of Fausta Moreira (a fishmonger) shortly after returning to Lisbon and, a year later, their only son, Raul, was born. Although a republican (and, later, anti-fascist), his criticism focused on those who deserved it rather than those of a particular political persuasion, and in 1914 he contributed to the satirical monarchist newspaper Papagaio Real, then under the artistic direction of Negreiros. He then began his pioneering comic strip, initially titled Quim e Manecas, in the comic supplement of O Século, the longest-running Portuguese comic strip, with over 500 issues between 1915 and 1953. These two characters gave rise to the first Portuguese comic film in 1916, in which Carvalhais played the father of Manecas. Unfortunately, all copies have been lost.

He contributed to the Gazeta dos Caminhos de Ferro de Portugal, the magazine of the Portuguese railway company; to Illustração portugueza starting in 1903; to O Zé from 1910; to O Século cômico from 1913; to Contemporânea from 1915; to O Riso da vitória from 1919; to Renovação and O domingo ilustrado from 1925; to the Repórter X from 1930; and in the Diário de Lisboa in 1933.

The 1920s were his most successful period. He edited ABC a Rir; was involved with the founding of and published works in the magazine Ilustração; and contributed to Diário de Notícias, A Corja (The Corrupted), O Espectro (The Spectrum), A Choldra, O Sempre Fixe, and ABC-zinho. Commissions were numerous, and his graphic work diversified, including illustrated postcards, several publicity leaflets for the Bristol Club, a billiards and dancing club, and for the music publishing house Sasseti. Later, in the 1950s, he also designed record covers for Columbia Records. Carvalhais contributed a painting called Paisagem com Moinho (Landscape with Mill) to the decoration of the Café A Brasileira in the Chiado district of Lisbon, which he frequented and which is still a popular café and tourist attraction. He also worked as a set designer for revues (known in Portugal as Teatro de Revista or Magazine Shows), including those at the Teatro Maria Vitória and Teatro Capitólio in Lisbon's Parque Mayer theatre district.

Carvalhais suffered from alcoholism and constant financial difficulties. His only solo exhibition was held in 1932 at the Casa da Imprensa (Press House) in Lisbon. In 1948, he was awarded the Domingos Sequeira Prize at the modern art exhibition of the Secretariado Nacional de Informação (SNI), a body of the Estado Novo dictatorship. On 30 March 1950, he married Fausta Moreira, his lifelong partner.

== Death ==
Carvalhais died on 2 March 1961, in the parish of Campo Grande in Lisbon. He was buried at the Alto de São João cemetery in Lisbon. He and his wife had lived in Queluz and his name was given to one of the schools in the town, the Stuart Carvalhais Secondary School. Their house was demolished in 2009. His name was also given to a small square in Lisbon.

A year after his death a book was published praising his work, with testimonies from people who knew and spent time with him. The Bohemian lifestyle of Carvalhais, who had little interest in material goods, inspired the humourist, Osvaldo de Sousa, to produce a book about him entitled Crónicas d'um Stuart, published in 1987. Also in his centenary year, José Pacheco published Stuart e o Modernismo em Portugal. In the same year, a retrospective of his work was organized by the Calouste Gulbenkian Foundation in its Modern Art Centre in Lisbon.
