= Manuel Gustavo Bordalo Pinheiro =

Portuguese modernist artist (1867–1920)

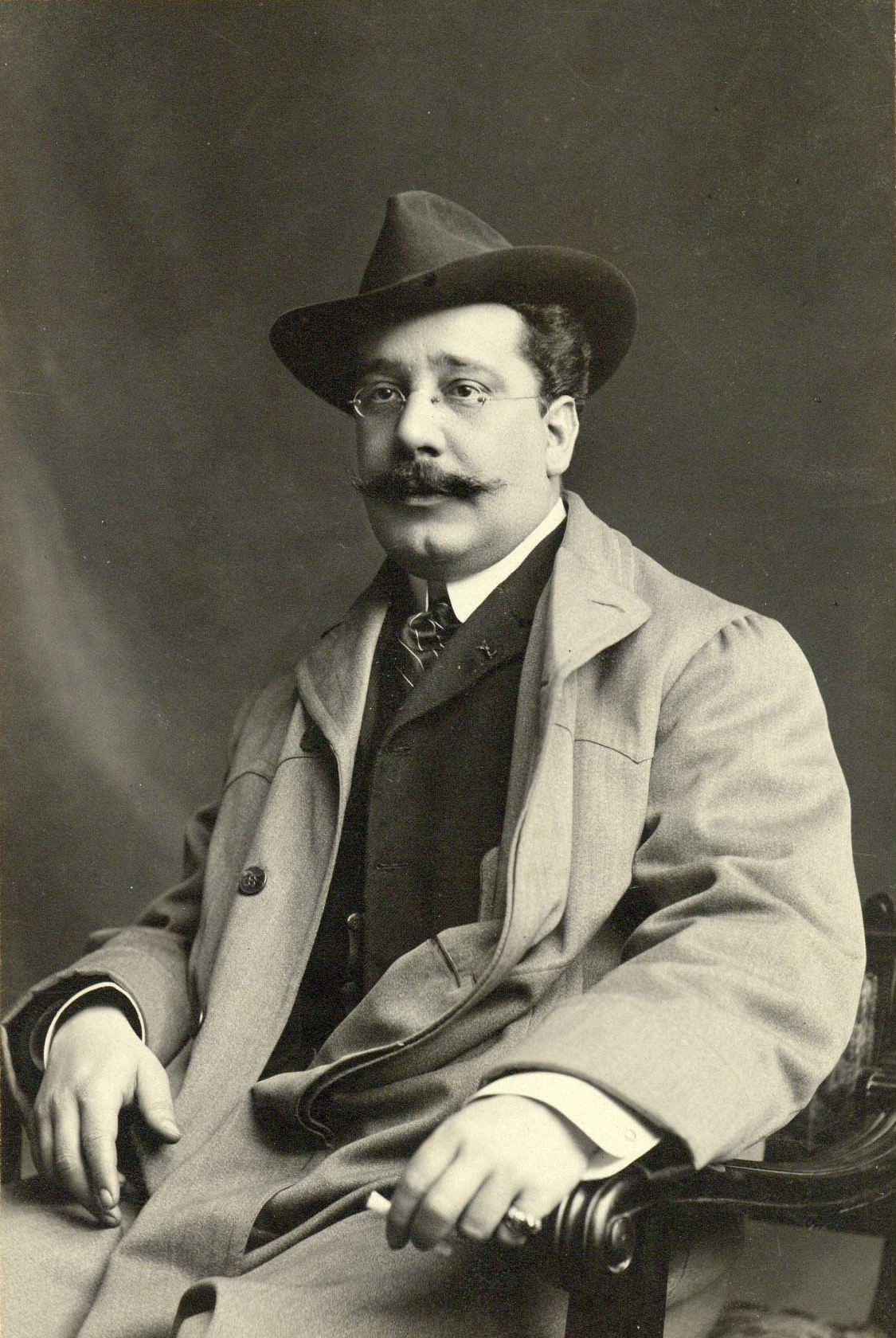
- Pinheiro c. 1919
- Born: 20 June 1867; Lisbon, Portugal
- Died: 6 December 1920 (aged 53); Lisbon, Portugal
- Known for: Illustration; Ceramics;
- Movement: Modernist

Manuel Gustavo Bordalo Pinheiro (1867–1920) was a Portuguese illustrator, ceramist, caricaturist, and comic-book illustrator. He was a pioneer of children's book illustration in Portugal, creating the hero who gave his name to the magazine O Gafanhoto (The Grasshopper).

== Early life and background ==
Bordalo Pinheiro was born into a distinguished artistic family in the Portuguese capital of Lisbon on 20 June 1867. He was the grandson of Manuel Maria Bordalo Pinheiro, a prolific painter, engraver, Romantic sculptor and theatre costume designer. His father, Rafael Bordalo Pinheiro, was known for his illustrations, caricatures, sculpture, and ceramics. The Rafael Bordalo Pinheiro Museum in Lisbon is devoted to his work. Manuel Gustavo's uncle was Columbano Bordalo Pinheiro, a Realist painter, considered by some to be the greatest Portuguese painter of the 19th century. His aunt, Maria Augusta Bordalo Pinheiro, was an artist who became an expert in bobbin lacework, for which she received a gold medal at the 1889 Exposition Universelle in Paris.

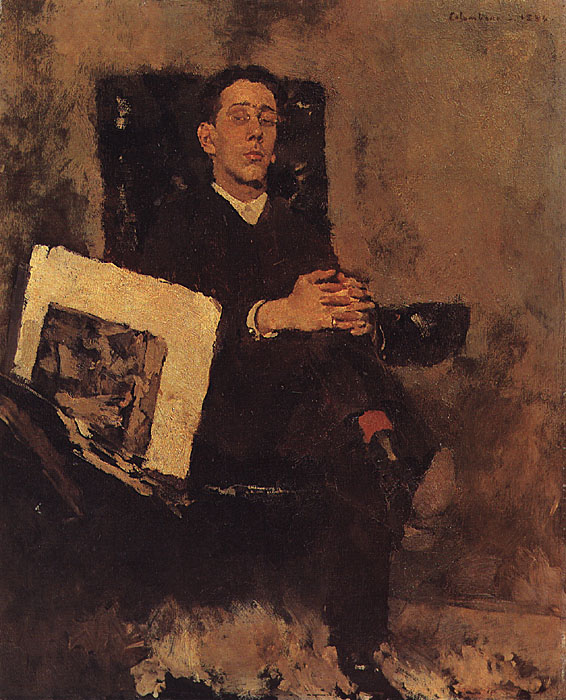
Portrait of Bordalo Pinheiro by his uncle, Columbano Bordalo Pinheiro

== Career ==
Manuel Bordalo Pinheiro began his career in the 1880s as an illustrator for his father's publication, O António Maria. In addition to this, he also worked on other magazines, such as Pontos nos ii and A Paródia, which he edited after his father's death. He also contributed to the magazines Serões, Ilustração Portugueza, Atlântida, Miau! and O Gafanhoto, among many others. He became the president of the Portuguese Humourists Group, organising its annual exhibitions, and was also a professor at the Rodrigues Sampaio Industrial School and the Fonseca Benevides Industrial School in Lisbon, where he taught design. He was portrayed in 1884 in an oil-on-wood painting by Columbano Bordalo Pinheiro.

Bordalo Pinheiro inherited the earthenware factory in Caldas da Rainha, a town to the north of Lisbon after his father's death in 1905, and succeeded him in managing it. He continued to hold exhibitions of his father's work but the factory was already in dire straits financially and eventually went bankrupt. In 1908, he founded a new factory, initially called "São Rafael" and, later, the Bordalo Pinheiro Factory. His output was characterized by the combination of the naturalism of Caldas da Rainha ceramics and the trends of the Art Nouveau movement. He also created several painted tile panels, drawing on his experience as a draftsman, for buildings in Caldas da Rainha and in the capital, such as the Military Museum and the Mendonça Palace in Lisbon.

Despite his own active career, Bordalo Pinheiro was unable to escape from his father's illustrious shadow. He made a major contribution to the development of the museum in Lisbon dedicated to his father's work, and contributed many pieces from his own collection to it. The museum opened in 1916. He travelled to Paris in 1918 to study ceramics.

== Death ==
Bordalo Pinheiro died on 8 September 1920 in Lisbon. On 6 December 1920, he was posthumously awarded the rank of Officer of the Military Order of Saint James of the Sword. His book, O Sr. Wilson e seus sete presentes, with text by Fernando de Magalhães, was published posthumously in 1921.
