= Maria Helena Vieira da Silva =

Portuguese-French artist (1908–1992)

- Self-portrait, 1942
- Born: 13 June 1908; Lisbon, Portugal
- Died: 6 March 1992 (aged 83); Paris, France
- Education: Academia de Belas-Artes, Académie Scandinave
- Known for: Painting
- Movement: Abstract art
- Spouse: Árpád Szenes

Signature
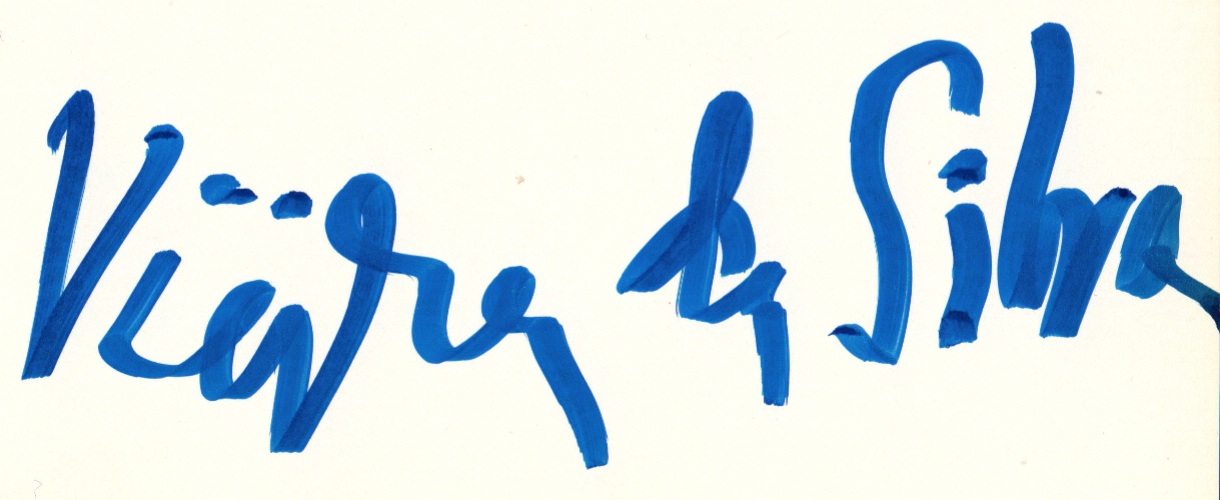

Maria Helena Vieira da Silva (13 June 1908 – 6 March 1992) was a Portuguese abstract painter. She was considered a leading member of the European abstract expressionism movement known as Art Informel. Her works feature complex interiors and city views using lines that explore space and perspective. She also worked in tapestry and stained glass.

== Life ==
Vieira da Silva was born in Lisbon, Portugal. At an early age, she traveled around the world because her affluent father was a diplomat. During this time, she came in contact with various avant-garde groups, such as the Italian Futurists and the Ballets Russes. At the age of eleven she had begun seriously studying drawing and painting at the Academia de Belas-Artes in Lisbon. In her teenage years she studied painting with Emília dos Santos Braga in Lisbon and Fernand Léger, sculpture with Antoine Bourdelle, and engraving with Stanley William Hayter. Vieira da Silva also worked with Fauve artist Othon Friesz.

In 1928 Vieira da Silva left Lisbon to study sculpture in Paris. She enrolled for a few months at the Académie Scandinave in Paris to study sculpture under Charles Despiau, and later she shifted her focus to painting, studying under Charles Dufresne, Henry de Waroquier, and Othon Friesz.

By 1930 she was exhibiting paintings in Paris; that same year she married the Hungarian painter Árpád Szenes, whom she had met in the French capital in 1929 when he was attending the Académie de la Grande Chaumière there. At the onset of World War II in 1939, Vieira da Silva moved to Portugal from France. The following year, she left for Rio de Janeiro, Brazil, where she gained prominence as an artist for her dense and complex compositions. After the war, Vieira da Silva lived and worked in Paris the rest of her life. She gained French citizenship in 1956. Vieira da Silva received the French government's Grand Prix National des Arts in 1966, the first woman so honored. She was named a Chevalier of the Legion of Honor in 1979. She died in Paris on 6 March 1992.

Her name sometimes appears written as "Elena", but the correct version, in Portuguese, is "Helena".

A crater on Mercury has been named in her honor.

== Work ==
Vieira da Silva’s initial work featured a decorative style of abstract patterning. She enjoyed toying with the idea of space and creating a false perception of space by having her painting set on a neutral background with flecks color giving a sense of depth. In the 1930s Vieira da Silva began producing her characteristic works which were heavily impastoed, and overlaid with a complex arrangement of small rectangles. In 1943, Vieira da Silva exhibited in Peggy Guggenheim's show Exhibition by 31 Women at the Art of This Century gallery in New York. As she evolved as an artist, she focused more on spatial manipulations using a wide range of techniques. She employed detailed patterns to create fabricated architectural forms and worked with complex lines, luminous spots and patterned surfaces. By the late 1950s she was internationally known for her dense and complex compositions, influenced by the art of Paul Cézanne and the fragmented forms, spatial ambiguities, and restricted palette of cubism and abstract art. She is considered to be one of the most important Post-War abstract artists although she is not a “pure” abstract painter. Her work is related to French Tachisme, American Abstract expressionism, and Surrealism, as were many of her contemporaries who were painting in Post-War Paris during the mid to late 1940s and early 1950s. Her paintings often resemble mazes, cities seen in profile or from high above or even library shelves in what seems to be an allegory to a never-ending search for Knowledge or the Absolute. Vieira da Silva has also created many prints, designs, for tapestries, ceramic decorations, and stained glass windows.

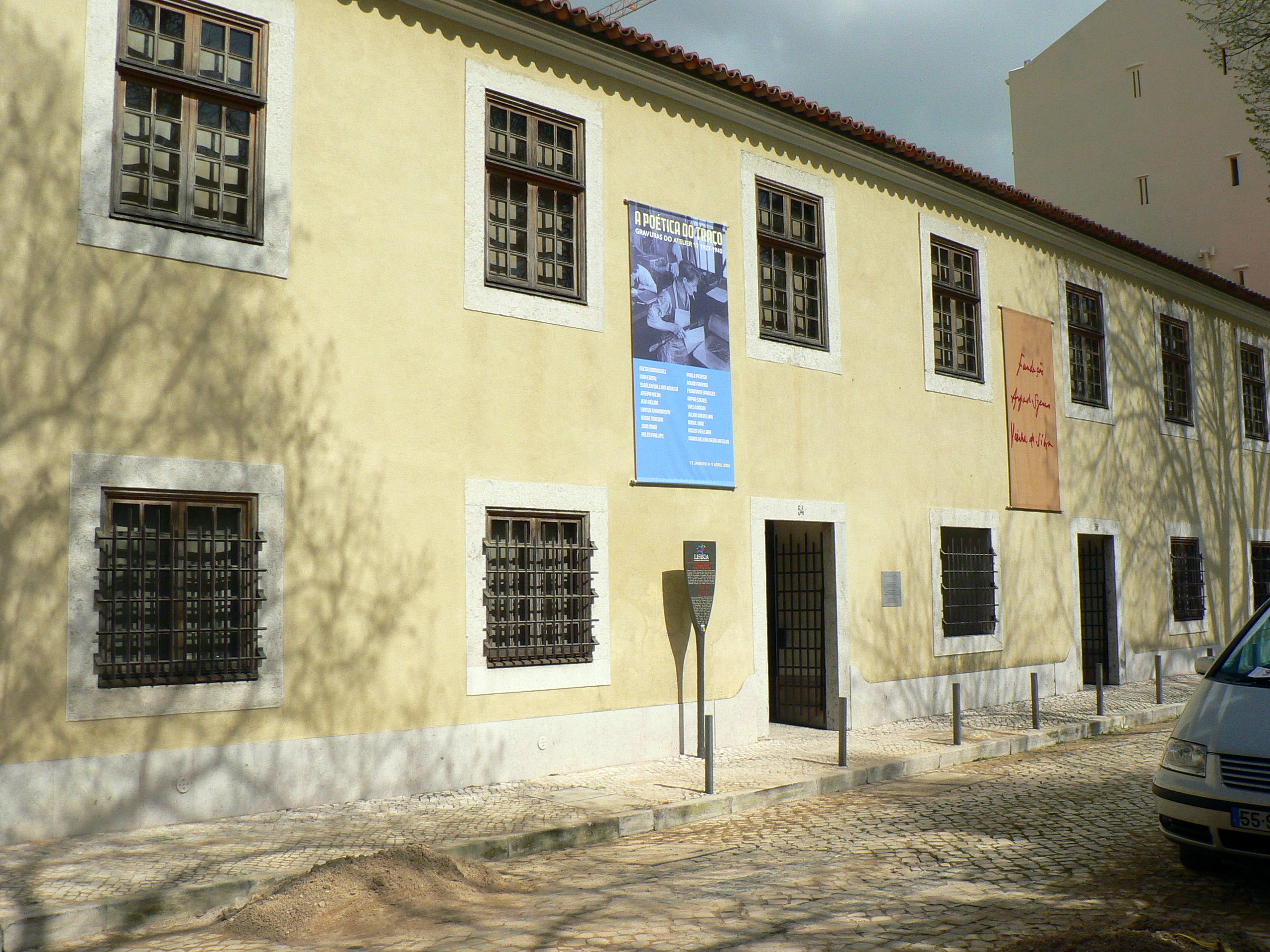
Árpád Szenes-Vieira da Silva Foundation, Lisbon

She exhibited her work widely, winning a prize for painting at the São Paulo Art Biennial in São Paulo in 1961.

In 1966-76 she made a stained-glass window for the Saint Jacques church in Reims together with Josef Sima. In 1974 she made the painting A Library Burning which uses many of the elements from that window. She decorated in 1988 the new Cidade Universitária subway station of Lisbon with azulejo panels.

In 1988 in honor of her 80th birthday, the Gulbenkian Museum in Lisbon and the Grand Palais in Paris had major retrospectives of her work.

In 1991, the Fundación Juan March, Madrid exhibited Vieira da Silva, the first retrospective of Vieira da Silva’s work in Spain. The paintings, created in a variety of mediums, were created between 1934 and 1986.

In November 1994, the Árpád Szenes-Vieira da Silva Foundation was inaugurated in Lisbon, a museum that displays a large collection of paintings by both artists.

From 2019 to 2020, a substantial survey exhibition of her paintings and works on paper toured from Jeanne Bucher Jaeger in Paris, to Waddington Custot in London, and Di Donna Galleries in New York.

Vieira da Silva’s work was included in the 2021 exhibition Women in Abstraction at the Centre Pompidou. In 2023 her work was included in the exhibition Action, Gesture, Paint: Women Artists and Global Abstraction 1940-1970 at the Whitechapel Gallery in London.

== Art market ==
The best selling painting of the artist was L'Incendie I (The Fire I) (1944), sold by £2,048,750 ($2,844,708) at Christie's, on 6 March 2018.

== Public collections ==
Vieira da Silva’s work is included in the collections of many art museums worldwide, such as the Centro de Arte Moderna Gulbenkian, in Lisbon, the National Museum of Contemporary Art of Chiado, in Lisbon, the Museo Nacional Centro de Arte Reina Sofía, in Madrid, the Musée d'Art Moderne de Paris, the Stedelijk Museum, in Amsterdam, the National Museum of Women in the Arts, in Washington, D.C., the Museum of Modern Art, New York, the Art Institute of Chicago, the Tate Modern, in London, the National Gallery of Canada, in Ottawa, the Solomon R. Guggenheim Museum, in New York, and the San Francisco Museum of Modern Art.

== See also ==
- La gare inondée (The Flooded Station)

== Bibliography ==
- Wat, Pierre and Kent Mitchell Minturn (2019). Maria Helena Vieira da Silva. Jeanne Bucher Jaeger, Waddington Custot, Di Donna Galleries. ISBN 978-2-918316-21-3
- Rosenthal, Gisela (1998). Vieira da Silva, 1908-1992 : the quest for unknown space. Taschen. ISBN 3-8228-8269-0. OCLC 40609565.
- Vallier, Dora (1982). Vieira da Silva, chemins d'approche. Ecritures, figures. Galilée. ISBN 2-7186-0227-9. OCLC 260009109.
- Weelen, Guy (1961). Vieira da Silva. Painters of today. Methuen. OCLC 12337320.
