= Greyhounds (Souza-Cardoso) =

Painting by Amadeo de Souza Cardoso

- Os Galgos (Portuguese)
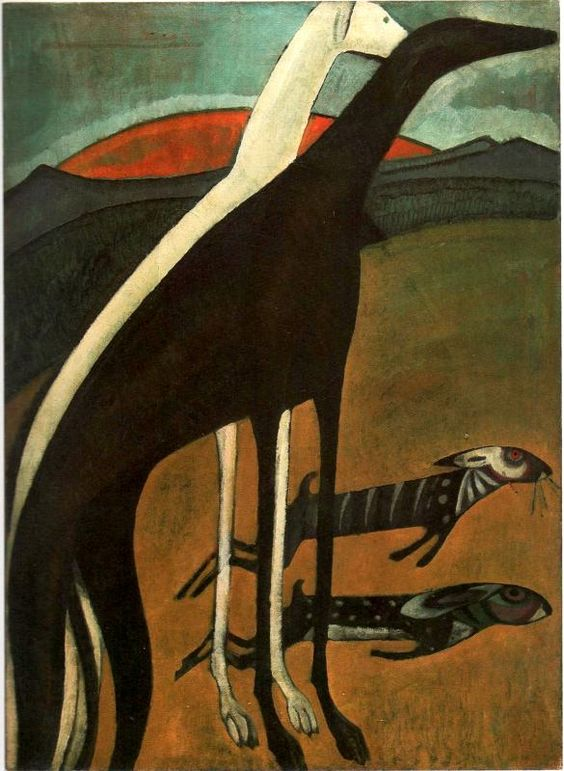
- Artist: Amadeo de Souza-Cardoso
- Year: 1911
- Medium: oil on canvas
- Dimensions: 100 cm × 73 cm (39 in × 29 in)
- Location: Centro de Arte Moderna Gulbenkian; Lisbon

Greyhounds (Portuguese: Os Galgos) is an oil on canvas painting by Portuguese artist Amadeo de Souza-Cardoso, from 1911.

== Description ==
The painting is an oil on canvas with overall dimensions of 100 x 73 centimeters. It is in the collection of the Centro de Arte Moderna Gulbenkian, in Lisbon.

== Analysis ==
The scene shows two greyhounds and two hares against a flat background.

== Sources ==
- João B. Serra; Schirn Kunsthalle Frankfurt; Centro Cultural de Belém (Lisbon, Portugal) (1998). Modern art in Portugal: 1910-1940 : the artist contemporaries of Fernando Pessoa. Edition Stemmle. ISBN 9783908161011.
- Portuguese Art Since 1910: Exhibition at the Diploma Galleries, Royal Academy of Arts, 2nd September to 1st October, 1978 : in Collaboration with the Anglo-Portuguese Society and the Calouste Gulbenkian Foundation. Calouste Gulbenkian Foundation. 1978.
