= Alice Rey Colaço =

Portuguese artist (1890–1978)

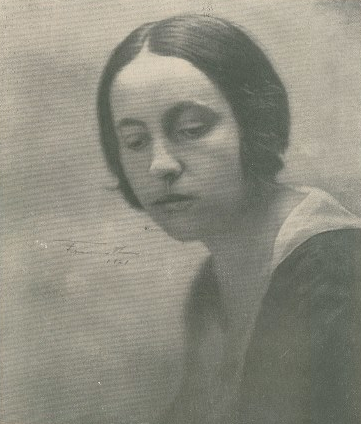
- Portrait of Alice Rey Colaço in the magazine "Ilustração Portuguesa" (1922)
- Born: Alice Schmidt Lafourcade Rey Colaço Menano; 11-07-1890; Lisbon, Portugal
- Died: 13-06-1978; Lisbon, Portugal

Alice Schmidt Constant Lafourcade Rey Colaço (Lisbon, 11 July 1890 — Lisbon, 13 June 1978) was a Portuguese painter, modernist illustrator, lyric singer, set designer and costume designer.

== Biography ==
Alice Rey Colaço belonged to a cultured and respected family that could afford a great artistic and cultural education for their children. Her sister, Amélia Rey Colaço, was one of the leading Portuguese theatre actors of the first half of the 20th century.

Alice started showing her work together with her friend and artist Mily Possoz in 1913, presenting in Porto and Lisbon. From 1918 she focused on illustration and collaborated with writers such as João Correia d'Oliveira, Adolfo Coelho, Maria da Luz Sobral and Carolina Michaëlis de Vasconcellos. From 1919 she worked as stage designer and costume designer at the theatre with a group of innovative artists who changed theatrical staging techniques in Portugal, such as José Leitão de Barros and Maria Adelaide Lima Cruz.

In 1924 she married Horácio Paulo Menano and stopped her activity as an artist to only engage in lyrical singing.

== Works and legacy ==
She showed her work in expositions at places such as "Salão da Ilustração Portuguesa", "Salão Borbone" and "Sociedade Nacional de Belas Artes". Examples of illustrations are "Os lobos, tragédia rústica em três actos" de Francisco Lage e João Correia d'Oliveira (1919), "João Pateta" de Adolfo Coelho (1922) and "Contos e lendas da nossa terra para crianças" from Maria da Luz Sobral and Carolina Michaelis de Vasconcelos (1924). In the theatre she designed the costume for her sister Amélia Rey Colaço in "Sonho de uma noite de Agosto" by Gregorio Martínez Sierra and the scenography of "A casa da boneca" at the Teatro Nacional de São Carlos.

In 2019, an exhibition was held to commemorate her contributions "120 anos do nascimento de Amélia Rey Colaço" at the Teatro Nacional D. Maria II.
