= A Library Burning =

1974 painting by Maria Helena Vieira da Silva

- A biblioteca em fogo (Portuguese), La bibliothèque en feu; (French)
- (image viewable via museum record)
- Artist: Maria Helena Vieira da Silva
- Year: 1974
- Medium: Oil on canvas
- Dimensions: 158.4 cm × 178.4 cm (62.4 in × 70.2 in)
- Location: Centro de Arte Moderna Gulbenkian, Lisbon

A Library Burning (La bibliothèque en feu; A biblioteca em fogo) is an oil on canvas painting by the Portuguese artist Maria Helena Vieira da Silva, created in 1974. It is held at the Centro de Arte Moderna Gulbenkian, in Lisbon.

== Description ==
Maria Helena Vieira da Silva, was a student of Fernand Léger, and Roger Bissière, and was a member of the "Second School of Paris"

This painting shows a brownish-framed series of vertical rectangles that are reminiscent of books on library shelves. The title may allude to the burning of the Library of Alexandria.

The whole is painted in muted tones of red and brown and is highly reminiscent of the artist's work for the Church of St. James in Reims, where modern windows were installed to replace those damaged in World War I. She won the window commission, with the Czech painter Josef Sima. The windows were designed during the years 1966-1976, while she was working in the workshop of master glazier Jacques Simon (1890-1974) who also worked with Marc Chagall on his windows in the nearby Reims Cathedral. Sima was known for his book bindings and symmetrical shapes.

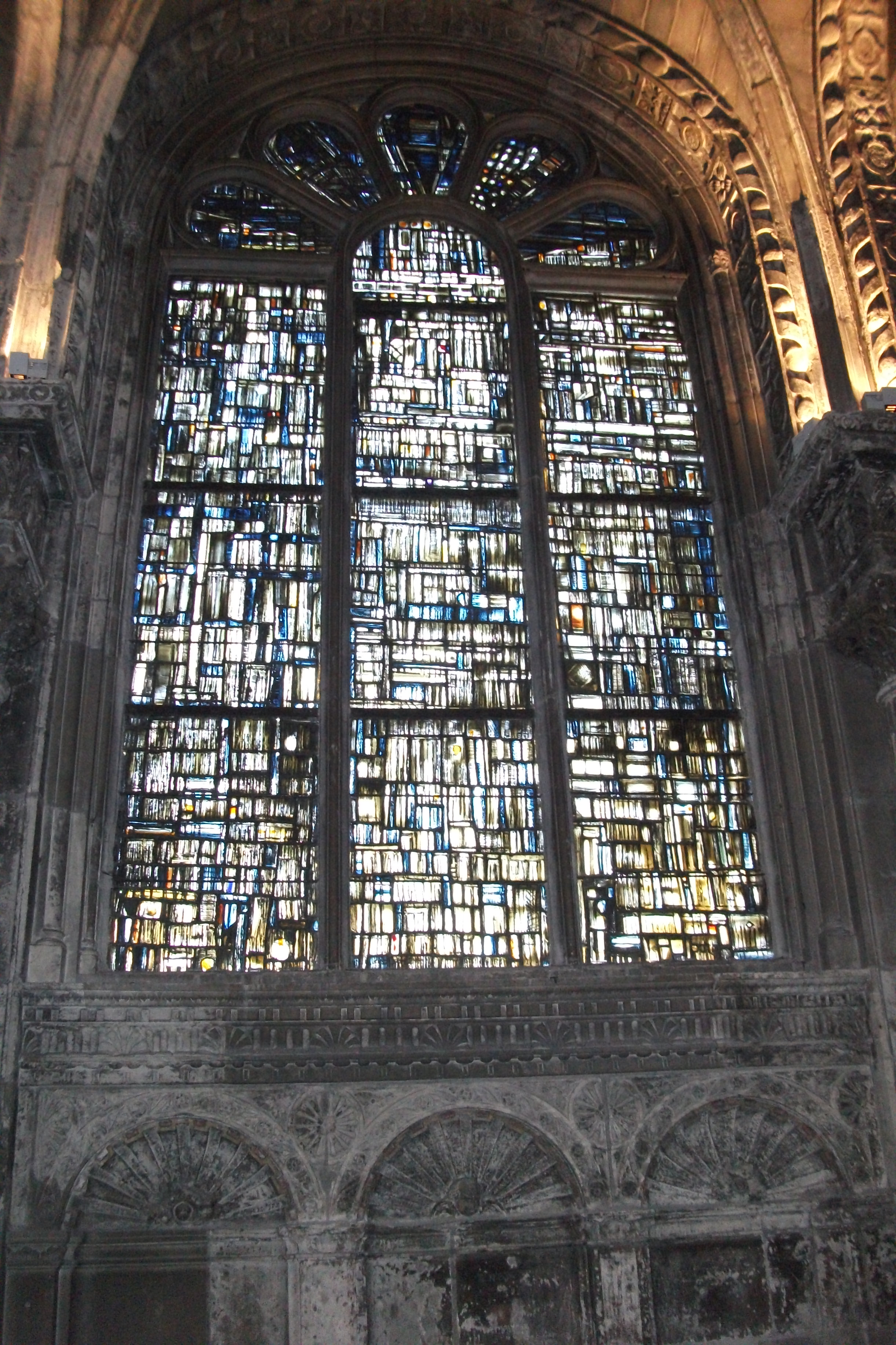
Window, Église Saint-Jacques de Reims, 1966–76
