= Emília dos Santos Braga =

Portuguese painter

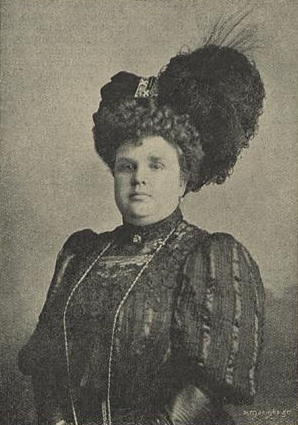
- Born: Emília Adelaide dos Santos e Silva Braga; 19 February 1867; Lisbon, Portugal
- Died: 28 December 1949 (aged 82); Lisbon, Portugal
- Occupation: Artist
- Known for: Paintings of female nudes; art teaching

Emília dos Santos Braga (1867—1949) was a Portuguese painter.

== Early life ==
Emília Adelaide dos Santos e Silva Braga was born in the Portuguese capital, Lisbon on 19 February 1867. She was the daughter of Carlos José dos Santos e Silva, a military surgeon, and of Emília Adelaide Xavier. She grew up in a liberal family environment where both she and her two sisters, Virgínia and Laura, were encouraged to paint and follow artistic careers. Her paternal grandfather, Manuel Inocêncio Liberato dos Santos (1805—1887), a celebrated composer, also played an important role in encouraging her to play music and to paint and in teaching her to play the piano and harp. However, despite her appreciation of music, her real passion was for painting. Her older brother, Carlos, who was director of a gunpowder factory, used to show his sister's paintings to artistic friends and reported back to their parents how well appreciated her work was, which persuaded them to support her artistic education.

Lisbon's Academia Nacional de Belas Artes (Fine Arts Academy) did not accept women for training until 1896 and her parents did not have the resources for her to go to Paris, as daughters of Lisbon's elite often did. Santos Braga and her sisters therefore took private lessons from José Moura Girão (1840—1916), one of her brother's friends and a celebrated painter. However, Santos Braga did not find him to be satisfactory and, being invited by her parents to choose her own teacher, said that she wanted José Malhoa, whose paintings she admired. She was a student of Malhoa from 1888. Shortly after, she also married her first husband, António Ferreira Braga, who died on 3 October 1903.

== First exhibits ==
In 1893 Santos Braga started showing her work. At her first exhibition she exhibited two portraits, one of which was purchased by King Carlos I and she was awarded a 3rd Class Medal, something unheard of for a novice, particularly a woman. While she was developing her career, although still tending to be looked upon as an "amateur", her teacher Malhoa's reputation was also growing rapidly. Being known as a student of Malhoa attracted people to her work and in exhibition catalogues she always referred to herself as a "disciple of Malhoa". Critics began to appreciate her work and comment on its rapid progression. Her paintings were compared favourably with those of other young painters, including those of her sisters.

In 1900 she exhibited outside of Portugal for the first time, presenting four works at the Paris Universal Exhibition. In 1901, the Portuguese Sociedade Nacional de Belas Artes (National Society of Fine Arts) was formed and Santos Braga immediately joined and showed at its exhibitions, winning awards and receiving positive criticism. By this time many of her paintings were of female nudes. José Malhoa began to hold solo exhibitions, while also including works by some of his disciples, including those of Santos Braga. In 1908, she exhibited in Rio de Janeiro and held her own first solo exhibition in Lisbon, with oil paintings and other works in pastel and charcoal. It was from this time that she began to be considered an "artist" rather than just an "amateur". In 1909, her nudes exhibited at the 7th exhibition of the Sociedade Nacional de Belas Artes attracted considerable attention and some negative criticism, which eventually led to her ceasing to exhibit with the Society. In 1912 she took a very large nude painting of an opium smoker to the National Fine Arts Exhibition in Madrid and in 1915 she exhibited at the Panama–Pacific International Exposition in San Francisco. In 1922 and 1924 she competed in international competitions in New York City and Rio de Janeiro.

== Art teacher ==
Santos Braga began teaching art in 1904, drawing her students, who were all women, from Lisbon's upper classes. Two of her students, Mily Possoz and Maria Helena Vieira da Silva established international reputations. In 1911 and 1913 she organized two exhibitions of her work and that of her students. By 1920 she was organizing an exhibition in which there were just three of her own works and 36 by her students. In 1931, a retrospective exhibition of her work was held in Lisbon. Her mentor, José Malhoa, died in 1933 and after his death her presence in exhibitions became rarer.

Her second husband, Francisco Augusto Trindade Baptista died on 13 March 1938. Santos Braga died in Lisbon on 28 December 1949 although some sources suggest it was 1950. She is buried in the Prazeres Cemetery, in Lisbon.
