= La gare inondée (The Flooded Station) =

1956 painting by Maria Helena Vieira da Silva

- Artist: Maria Helena Vieira da Silva
- Year: 1956
- Catalogue: GW and J-FJ 1407
- Medium: oil on canvas
- Dimensions: 113.4 cm × 146 cm (44.6 in × 57 in)
- Location: Private collection

La gare inondée (The Flooded Station) is an oil on canvas painting by the Portuguese-French artist Maria Helena Vieira da Silva that she executed in 1956. The title and subject matter reflect the artist's feelings towards post-war Europe; she often depicted grim, pessimistic landscape scenes. The painting was to be auctioned at Christie's, London, on 13 February 2014, when it was expected to fetch between £350,000 and £450,000, but was withdrawn.

== Description ==
Detail showing da Silva's dense mesh of lines and marks.

The painting is typical of Vieira da Silva's 1950s work that define her oeuvre and which paralleled the development of abstract expressionism in the United States at the same time. However, Vieira da Silva's work differs from that movement in her treatment of space. She sought to free herself from the constraint of linear perspective, achieving in her mature work a sense of space with a dense mesh of lines and marks set against a background of flecks of color varying in intensity of tone.

== Bibliography ==
- G. Weelen and J.-F. Jaeger, Vieira da Silva Catalogue Raisonné, Geneva 1994, no. 1407 (illustrated, p. 279).
