= Jorge Barradas =

Portuguese modernist artist (1894–1971)

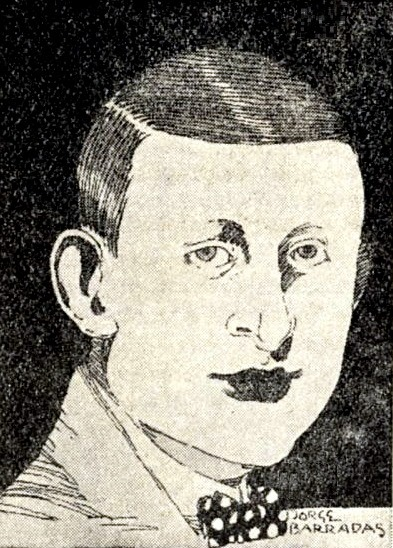
- Self-portrait, 1921
- Born: Jorge Nicholson Moore Barradas; 16 July 1894; Lisbon, Portugal
- Died: 30 June 1971 (aged 76); Lisbon
- Education: Lisbon School of Fine Arts
- Known for: Illustration, ceramics
- Movement: Modernist

Jorge Nicholson Moore Barradas, nicknamed "Barradinhas" (1894–1971), was a Portuguese modernist painter, ceramicist, illustrator, and caricaturist, who was noted for chronicling social changes. He had a multifaceted career, establishing himself first as a humourist and in drawings for advertising, and later on as a painter. From the mid-1940s, he redirected his work, dedicating himself to ceramics and tiles. He is considered a key figure in the renewal of this field in Portugal.

== Early life ==
Barradas was born in the Portuguese capital of Lisbon on 16 July 1894. Coming from a large family of modest means, with Scottish and Irish ancestry on his mother's side, he attended the technical course at the Machado de Castro School, but did not complete his training as he wanted to pursue an artistic career. In 1911, he enrolled at the Lisbon School of Fine Arts, which he would also abandon two years later, concentrating on teaching himself, as did many other artists of his generation. Through Joaquim Guerreiro, director of A Sátira, he met many of the artists who would participate in the First Salon of Portuguese Humourists, a milestone in the development of modernism in Portugal. Barradas, then 17, was the youngest of the 28 exhibitors, which included names such as Almada Negreiros, Cristiano Cruz, Stuart Carvalhais, Emmerico Nunes, and Manuel Gustavo Bordalo Pinheiro. He participated in the second Humourists Exhibition in 1913 and in early Humourists and Modernists Exhibitions (1915, 1920, and 1924).

He exhibited solo for the first time in Vigo, Spain in 1913. In 1916 he travelled to Paris. The following year he exhibited among the artists of the Galeria das Artes, owned by José Pacheko, in the Bobone Salon photography studio in Lisbon, the first commercial art gallery in Portugal, and practically the only such gallery that that generation of modernists ever had available to exhibit in. His drawings from this period followed a modernist style with elongated figures, and use of monochrome. They were described as being very "feminine". It is said that his style oscillated between Art Deco and Aubrey Beardsley. His works included advertisements created between 1913 and 1915 for the hat shop, A Elegante, and for the Companhia Nacional de Moagem, a food producer, revamping the graphic design of the company's biscuit boxes.

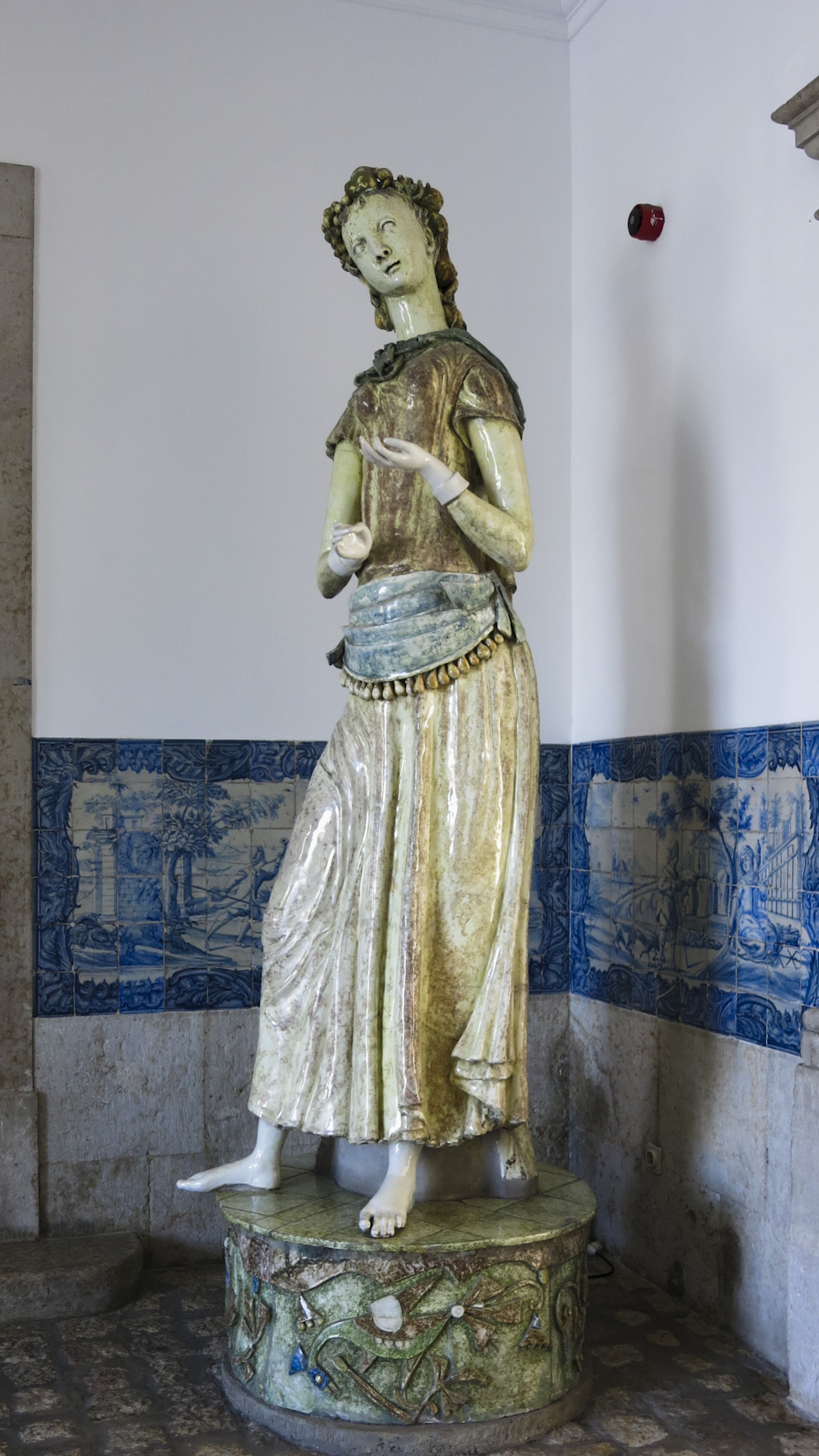
Ceramic sculpture 1959

== Career ==
Barradas contributed to several magazines with different political persuasions. These included being the artistic director of the weekly ABC a Rir (ABC Laughing), which he handed over to Stuart Carvalhais after just seven issues "due to lack of professional assistance"; O Riso da vitória (a humorous newspaper published for a few months that he founded in 1919 with the journalist and playwright, Henrique Roldão); and illustrations in A Pátria; Ilustração Portuguesa, the Contemporânea, O Século cômico, and in the daily newspaper Diário de Lisboa. In May 1920, Ilustração Portuguesa organised a solo exhibition for Barradas at the Automobile Club of Portugal. According to José-Augusto França, throughout the 1920s Barradas stood out as one of the most important and most popular Portuguese illustrators and cover artists.

In 1923, he went to Brazil, where he stayed for several months. He contributed to the Ibero-American Exposition of 1929 in Seville and then spent six months in São Tomé, which inspired a group of paintings that he exhibited in Lisbon in 1931. In 1931 he was one of the winners of the competition to decorate the Portuguese pavilion at the Paris Colonial Exposition. He won a gold medal at the 1937 Paris International Exposition. In 1939 he contributed a large panel entitled Prince Henry and the School of Sagres to the Portuguese pavilion at the 1939 New York World's Fair. He also contributed decorations to the Portuguese World Exhibition in Lisbon in 1940.

Throughout the 1930s he worked on set designs for revues (known in Portugal as Teatro de Revista or Magazine Shows). With his work now spread across a broader range of activities his contributions to newspapers and magazines slowed. However, he was a regular participant in the Modern Art Exhibitions of the Secretariado Nacional de Informação, a body of the Estado Novo dictatorship. In 1939, he won the Columbano Prize, named after the artist Columbano Bordalo Pinheiro, and in 1949, the Sebastião de Almeida Prize. For the next twenty years he focused on large-scale commissions, largely involving ceramics, such as panels at the Banco Português do Atlântico in Porto, an Annunciation at the Basilica of Sant'Eugenio in Rome in 1951, which is a work in fibreglass appliqé, internal tiles for the Hotel Ritz in Lisbon in the 1950s, and two relief panels for the refectory of the Calouste Gulbenkian Foundation in Lisbon in 1969. In 1965, he held a solo exhibition of smaller ceramics at the Diário de Notícias Gallery in Lisbon, often titled Caprichos (Caprices).

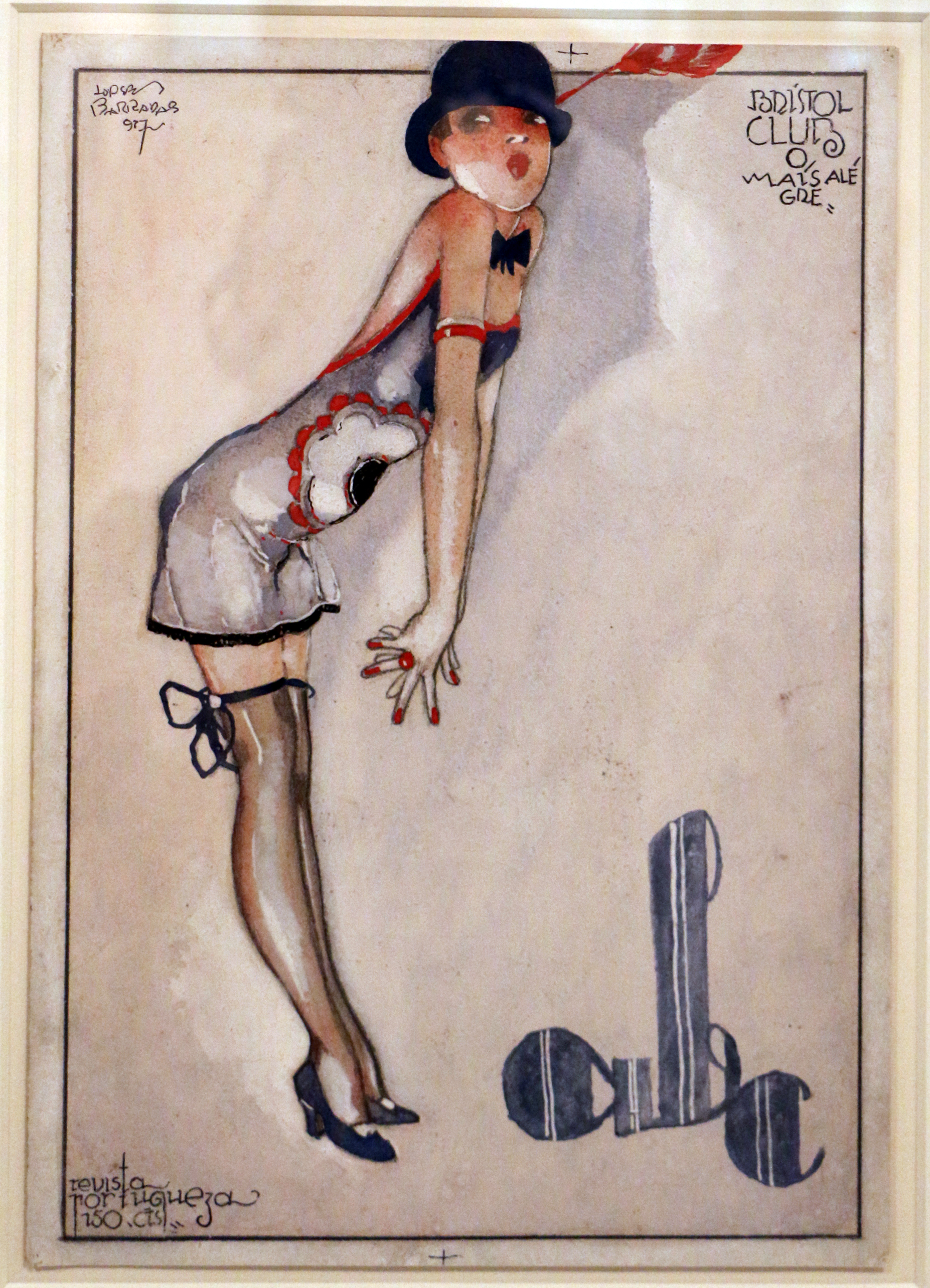
Advertisement for the Bristol Club by Jorge Barradas

Barradas is represented in public and private collections, including the National Museum of Contemporary Art of Chiado (MNAC), the Centro de Arte Moderna Gulbenkian, and the National Museum of the Azulejo (tile), all in Lisbon, and the Soares dos Reis National Museum in Porto. The São Mamede Gallery in Lisbon has held three retrospective exhibitions of his work, in 1972, 1977 and 1984, and a retrospective was held in 2023 by MNAC.

== Awards and honours ==
On July 5, 1968, he was awarded the rank of Commander of the Military Order of Saint James of the Sword. In 1971, Lisbon City Council named a street after him. His name was also given to the Jorge Barradas Elementary School, located on the same street. Several other streets or squares are also named after him.

== Death ==
Barradas died in Lisbon on 30 June 1971.
