= Di Donna Galleries =

Art gallery in New York City

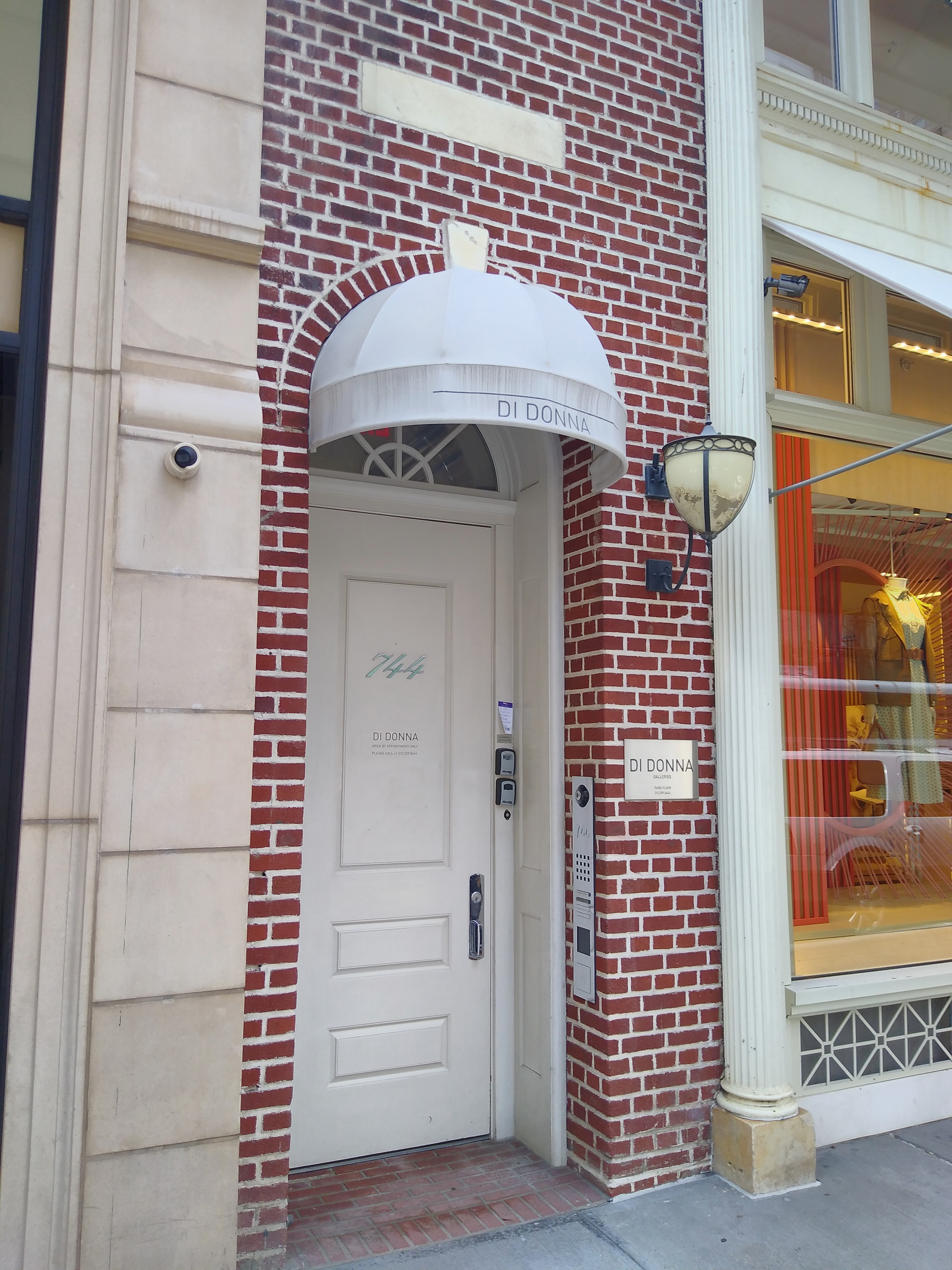
- Coordinates: 40.767°N 73.969°W
- Website: didonna.com

Di Donna Galleries is an American art gallery in New York City. It specializes in Modern and Surrealist art.

The gallery was initially located on the second floor of The Carlyle Hotel at 981 Madison Avenue, New York City, the former home of Ursus Books. In May 2016, the gallery moved a few blocks south to a new 6,000 square foot space at 744 Madison Avenue at East 64th Street.

The gallery was founded in November 2010 and was formerly known as Blain Di Donna. A number of monographic, museum-quality exhibitions were staged there such as René Magritte, Dangerous Liaisons (2011); André Masson, The Mythology of Desire: Masterworks from 1925 to 1945 (2012); Jean Arp: A Collection of Wood Reliefs and Collages (2012), Paul Delvaux (2013), in collaboration with the Paul Delvaux Foundation.
