= Manuel Maria Bordalo Pinheiro =

Portuguese painter and sculptor (1815–1880)

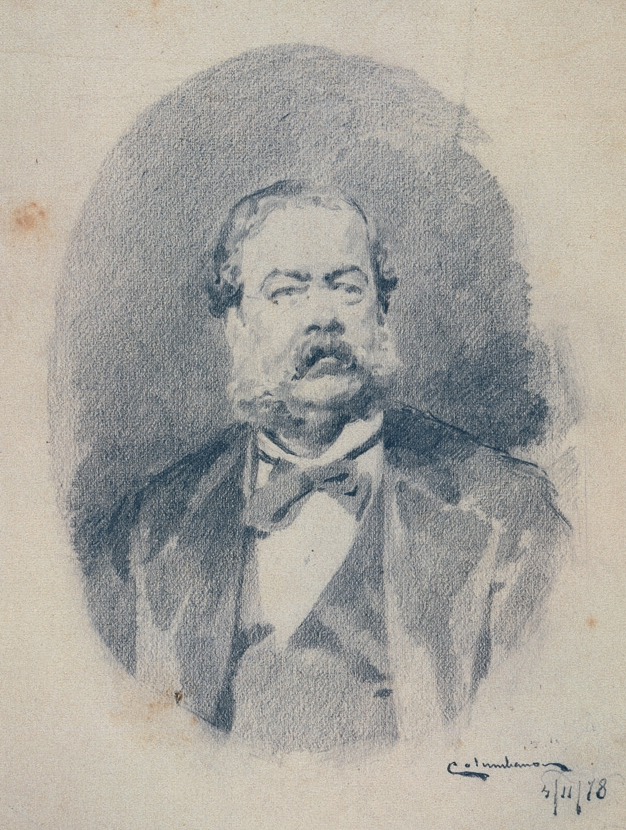
- Portrait of his father by Columbano Bordalo Pinheiro
- Born: 28 November 1815; Santa Justa, Lisbon, Portugal
- Died: 31 January 1880 (aged 64); Lisbon, Portugal
- Awards: Order of Charles III of Spain

Manuel Maria Bordalo Pinheiro (1815–1880) was a Portuguese painter, engraver, sculptor, and poet, credited with the revival of woodcuts in the country. He served as the first officer of the secretariat of the Chamber of Peers of Portugal and was an honorary member of the Royal Academy of Fine Arts. He was the father of the artists, Columbano Bordalo Pinheiro, Rafael Bordalo Pinheiro and Maria Augusta Bordalo Pinheiro.

== Early life ==
Bordalo Pinheiro was born on 28 November 1815 in Santa Justa, Lisbon. He was the son of Manuel Félix de Oliveira Pinheiro (1774–1845), First President of the Lisbon Lawyers' Association, and of Jacinta Adelaide Herculana de Almeida Bordalo Alvarez y Asturias (1779–1839). In 1833, he joined up as a volunteer for the Liberal cause during the War of the Two Brothers, a fact that he later spoke of with some pride. He began an artistic apprenticeship in 1840 and was a disciple of the painter António Manuel da Fonseca, the miniaturist Luís Pereira de Resende, and the sculptor Feliciano José Lopes. In 1840 he married Augusta Maria do Ó de Carvalho Prostes in Lisbon, with whom he had 9 children.

== Career ==
Bordalo Pinheiro was the first officer of the secretariat of the Chamber of Most Worthy Peers, although the dates he held this position do not seem to be available. In this position he devoted only his free time to art, having first shown at the First Triennial Exhibition of the Royal Academy of Fine Arts. At an early stage he published several poetic works and illustrated literary journals, which subsequently appeared under his editorship, including the weekly Época and the first Jornal de Belas Artes. A friend of the writer Alexandre Herculano, he assisted him in the founding of the magazine O Panorama, contributing woodcut illustrations. The making of woodcuts was a skill that had been almost forgotten in Portugal until he began to use the technique.

Bordalo Pinheiro also sculpted, with works including statuettes of the Viscount of Castilho and Pedro de Sousa Holstein, 1st Duke of Palmela and a bust of the poet Luís de Camões. In his later years, he devoted himself primarily to Flemish-style painting. In 1849, in the service of the Duke of Palmela, he began a series of artistic travels with the aim of copying the works of great Spanish, French, Dutch, and Flemish painters. This trip culminated in his participation in the Great Exhibition in London in 1851. Essentially inspired by Flemish miniatures, he developed a satirical social realist style, which would, in turn, influence the work of his sons Columbano and Rafael.

In addition to the medals for his works that he received in various exhibitions, he was decorated by the Spanish government with the Order of Charles III. Five of his works were purchased by King Ferdinand II of Portugal. He also devoted himself to the theatre. For a time he designed the costumes at the Teatro Nacional de São Carlos and the D. Maria II National Theatre. He also translated several plays, including the Spanish lyrical comedy, El Duende, which was performed in three Lisbon theatres.

== Death ==
Bordalo Pinheiro died in Belém near Lisbon on 31 January 1880.
