= Rafael Bordalo Pinheiro Museum =

Art museum in Lisbon, Portugal

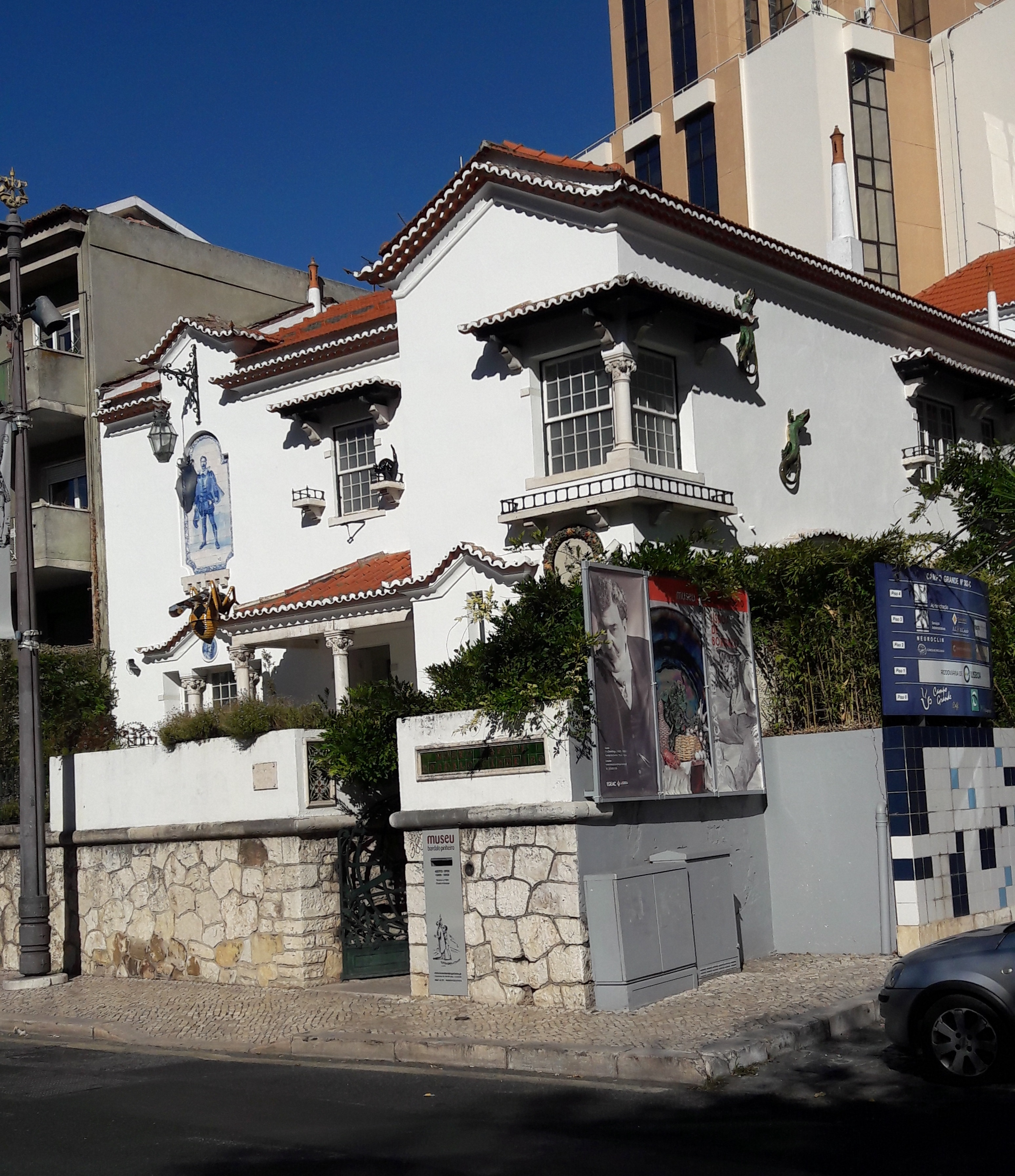
- Location: Portugal
- Coordinates: 38°45′32″N 9°09′15″W
- Website: http://museubordalopinheiro.cm-lisboa.pt,%20http://museubordalopinheiro.pt
- Location of Rafael Bordalo Pinheiro Museum

Rafael Bordalo Pinheiro Museum (Portuguese: Museu Rafael Bordalo Pinheiro) is a municipal museum, in Lisbon, Portugal. It is entirely dedicated to the life and works of the artist Rafael Bordalo Pinheiro (1846–1905). It shows many of his collections of caricatures and ceramics.
