= Eduardo Viana =

Portuguese painter (1881–1967)

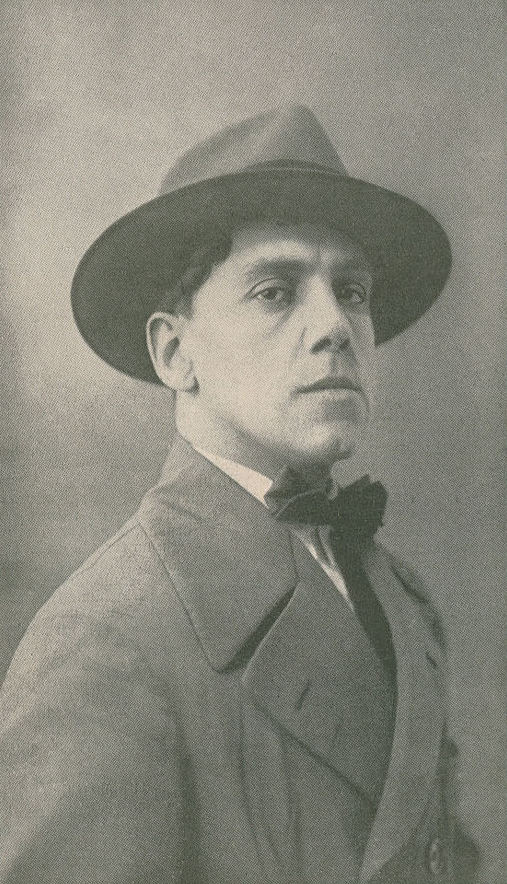
Eduardo Viana

Eduardo Afonso Viana (28 November 1881, in Lisbon, Portugal – 21 February 1967, in Lisbon) was a Portuguese painter. He was one of the members of the first modern generation in Portuguese painting, like Amadeo de Souza Cardoso and Almada Negreiros. He was more conservative in his approach to modern painting. The best examples of his assimilation of the modern styles in his work appears in the paintings he did in 1916, due to the influence of both Robert Delaunay and Sonia Delaunay, who he befriended during their presence in Portugal. He latter followed the post-impressionist style inspired by Cézanne in some of his best paintings. He's represented in some of the best Portuguese museums, like Chiado Museum, in Lisbon, and the National Museum Soares dos Reis, in Porto.

He studied at the Academia de Belas Artes de Lisboa and, from 1905, in Paris with Jean-Paul Laurens. During this time, he mostly painted natural landscapes. When World War I broke out he returned to Lisbon with his friend Amadeo de Souza Cardoso and other fellow Portuguese. He spent 1915-16 working with the Orphist painters Robert and Sonia Delaunay in Vila do Conde. He was fascinated by their experiments in simultaneity.

Viana's paintings were a mirror of the life of his country. One of the best examples of this motif is his 1916 painting 'In Revolt', in which he showed Portuguese life through colorful arcs. But Viana was fond of Nature. He had a strong attachment to naturalism. In 1917, he painting 'K4: The Blue Square', considered a homage to Portuguese modernism, was inspired by the book of the same name by Almada Negreiros and was dedicated to Amadeo.
