= Amadeo de Souza-Cardoso =

Portuguese painter (1887–1918)

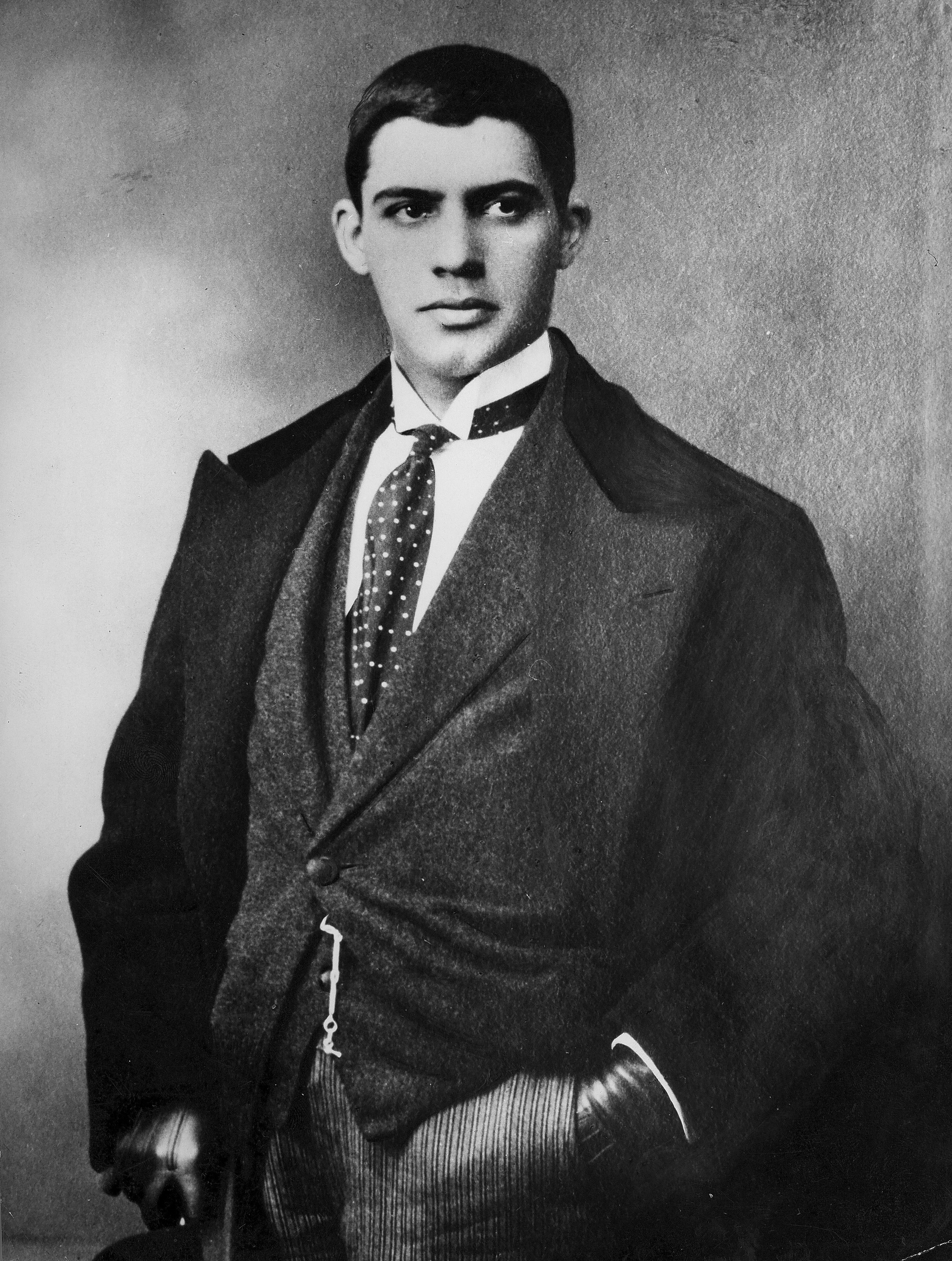
- Born: 14 November 1887; Mancelos, Amarante, Portugal
- Died: 25 October 1918 (aged 30); Espinho, Portugal
- Known for: Painting
- Movement: Futurism, Modernism

Signature
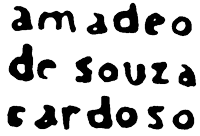

Amadeo de Souza-Cardoso (14 November 1887 – 25 October 1918) was a Portuguese painter.

Belonging to the first generation of Portuguese modernist painters, Amadeo de Souza-Cardoso stands out among all of them for the exceptional quality of his work and for the dialogue he established with the historical avant-gardes of the early 20th century. "The artist developed, between Paris and Manhufe, the most serious possibility of modern art in Portugal in an international dialogue, intense but little known, with the artists of his time". His painting is articulated with open movements such as Cubism, Futurism or Expressionism, reaching in many moments - and in a sustained way in the production of recent years - a level comparable in everything to the cutting-edge production of his contemporary international art.

Death at the age of 30 will dictate the abrupt end of a fully mature pictorial work and a promising international career but still in the process of affirmation. Amadeo would be forgotten a long time ago, inside and, above all, outside Portugal: "The silence that for many years covered the interpretive visibility of his work with a thick blanket […], and that was also the silence of Portugal as a country, not allowed the international historical update of the artist "; and "Amadeo de Souza-Cardoso just started his path of historiographic recognition".

== Early life ==
Amadeo was born in Manhufe, a parish of Amarante, the son of Emília Cândida Ferreira Cardoso and José Emygdio de Sousa Cardoso, "a family of good rural bourgeoisie, powerful and very religious, among nine brothers [...]. His father was a kind "gentleman farmer", rich vintner, with a practical spirit, wishing to educate his children efficiently".

At the age of 18, he entered the Superior School of Fine Arts of Lisbon and one year later (on his 19th birthday) he went to Paris, where he intended to continue his studies but soon quit the architecture course and started studying painting. By then, he was especially experienced in caricatures. In 1908, he lived in number 14 of the Cité de Falguière. There, he went to ateliers in the Académie des Beaux-Arts and the Viti Academy of the Catalan painter Anglada Camarasa. In 1910 he stayed for some months in Brussels and, in 1911, his works were displayed in the Salon des Indépendants. He became close friends with artists and writers such as Gertrude Stein, Juan Gris, Amedeo Modigliani, Alexander Archipenko, Max Jacob, the couple Robert Delaunay and Sonia Delaunay, and Constantin Brâncuși, as well as the German artist Otto Freundlich. He was also friends with the Italian Futurists Gino Severini and Umberto Boccioni.

He established contact with other Portuguese artists residing in Paris, including Francisco Smith, Eduardo Viana and Emmerico Nunes. He attends the studios of Godefroy and Freynet in order to prepare for admission to the architecture course, a project he embraces, partly to meet family expectations, but which he ends up abandoning. He publishes caricatures in Portuguese periodicals such as O Primeiro de Janeiro (1907) and Illustração Popular (1908 - 1909).

The beginning of his activity as a painter probably dates from 1907. The following year he meets Lucie Meynardi Pecetto, with whom he would marry seven years later. In 1909 he attended the classes of the painter Anglada-Camarasa at the Académie Vitti and later the Free Academies.

In 1913, Amadeo de Souza Cardoso participated in two seminal exhibitions: the Armory Show in the United States, that travelled to New York City, Boston, and Chicago, and the Erste Deutsche Herbstsalon at the Galerie Der Sturm in Berlin, Germany, directed by Herwarth Walden. Both exhibitions presented modern art to a public that was still not used to it. Amadeo was among the most commercially successful of the exhibitors at the Armory Show, as he sold seven of the eight works he had on display there.

Amadeo met with Antoni Gaudí in Barcelona in 1914, and then left for Madrid, where the shock of World War I was already underway. His friend Amedeo Modigliani showed sculptures in his Paris studio. Amadeo returned then to Portugal where he married Lucie Meynardi Peccetto. He maintained contact with other Portuguese artists and poets such as Almada Negreiros, Santa-Rita Pintor and Teixeira de Pascoaes. On 25 October 1918, at the age of 30, he died in Espinho, of the Spanish flu.

== Career ==
=== Work ===
His early works, under the tutelage of the Spanish painter Anglada Camarasa, were stylistically close to impressionism. Around 1910, influenced both by cubism and by futurism, he became one of the first modern Portuguese painters. His style is aggressive and vivid both in form and colour and his works may seem random or chaotic in their compositional structure at first sight but are clearly defined and balanced. His more innovative paintings, such as "Trou de la Serrure", resemble collages and seem to pave the way to abstractionism or even dadaism.

In 1912 he published an album with twenty drawings, and copied the story of Gustave Flaubert, "La Légende de Saint Julien to l'Hospitalier", in a calligraphic manuscript with illustrations, but these early works attracted little notice. In 1913 he exhibited eight works in the Armory Show in the US, some of which are now in American museums. The following year, he returned to Portugal and initiated a great and meteoric career in the experimentation of new forms of expression.

In 1917 Amadeo and other artists such as Santa-Rita and Fernando Pessoa participated in the magazine Portugal Futurista, which had only one edition published. In 1916, he displayed in Oporto 114 artworks with the heading "Abstraccionism", that also was displayed in Lisbon, one and another with newness and some scandal. Cubism was in expansion throughout Europe and was an important influence in his analytical cubism. Amadeo de Souza Cardoso explored expressionism and in his last works he tried new techniques and other forms of plastic expression.

In 1925, a retrospective exhibition in France of the painter's artwork was well received by the public and critics. Ten years later in Portugal, an award was created to distinguish modern painters: the Souza-Cardoso prize.

== Legacy ==
After his death, his work remained almost unknown until 1952, when a room dedicated to his paintings in Municipal Museum Amadeo Souza-Cardoso gained the public's attention.

His work has been the subject of only two major international retrospectives , the first in 1958 and more recently in 2016, at the Grand Palais in Paris.

In 1998, the Fundación Juan March Madrid displayed the first exhibition dedicated to Souza-Cardoso’s work in Spain. The exhibition featured paintings, watercolors and drawings and was in collaboration with the Fundação Calouste Gulbenkian.

On 14 November 2012, Google celebrated his 125th birthday with a Google Doodle.

== Selected artworks ==
- Retrato de Francisco Cardoso (Portrait of Francisco Cardoso)
- Menina dos Cravos (Carnation Girl)
- Cozinha da Casa de Manhufe (Manhufe's Kitchen)
- Entrada (Entrance)
- Pintura (Painting), Brut 300 TSF
- Os falcões (Hawks), álbum XX dessins, publ. in Paris, 1912
- O castelo (Castle) 1912
- Pintura (Painting), Coty, 1917
- Máscara de olho verde (The Green-eyed Mask), 1916
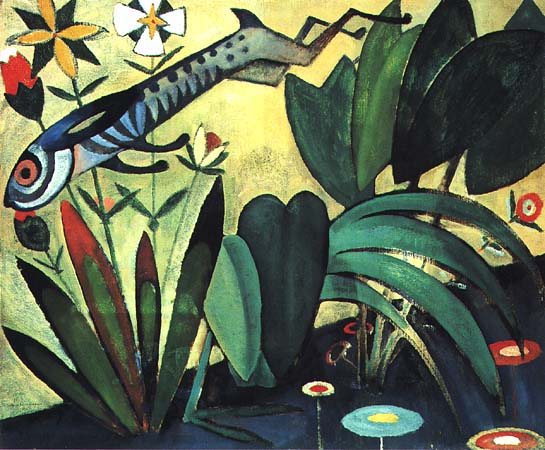
Saut du Lapin, 1911

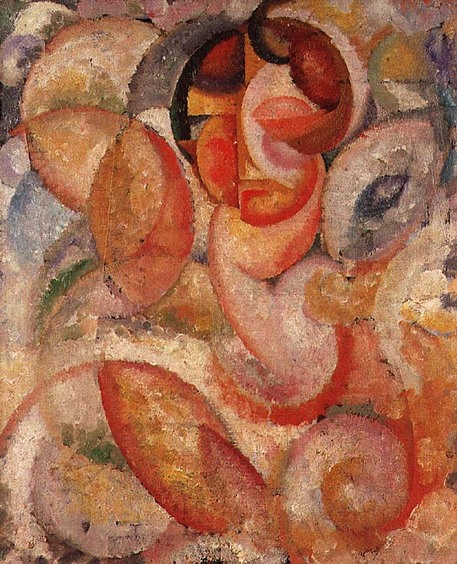
Cabeça, 1913

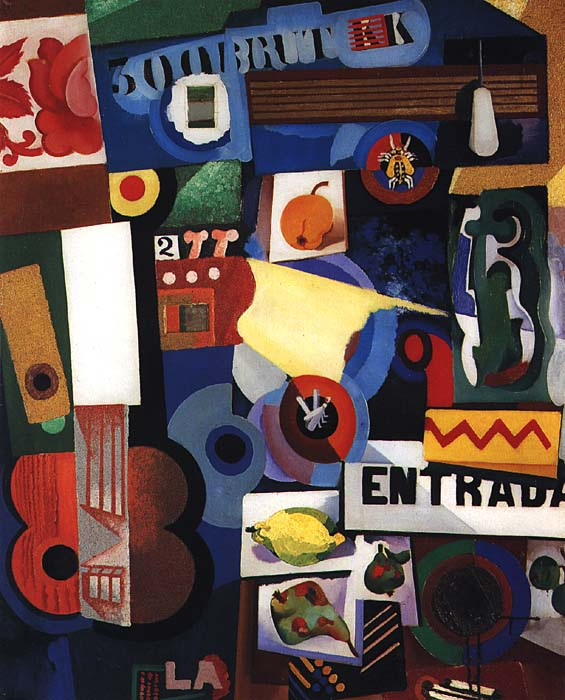
Entrada, 1917

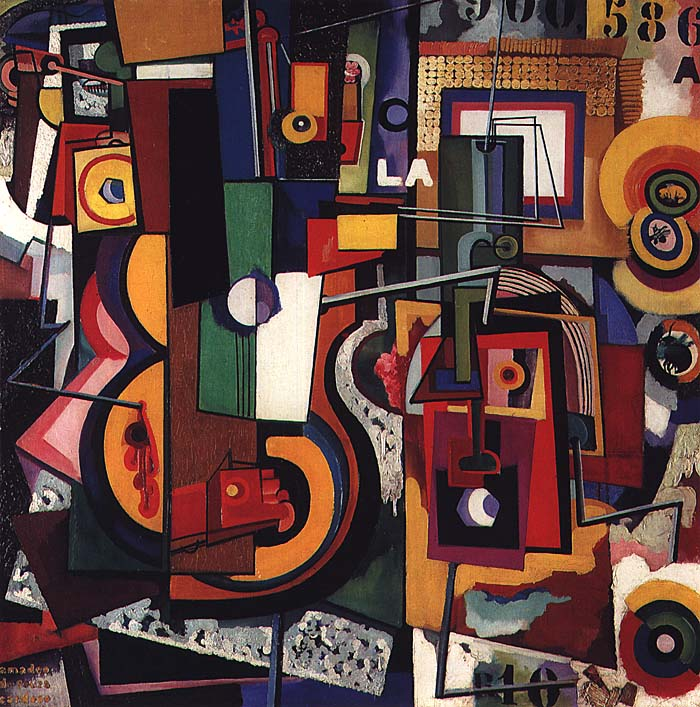
Pintura, 1917

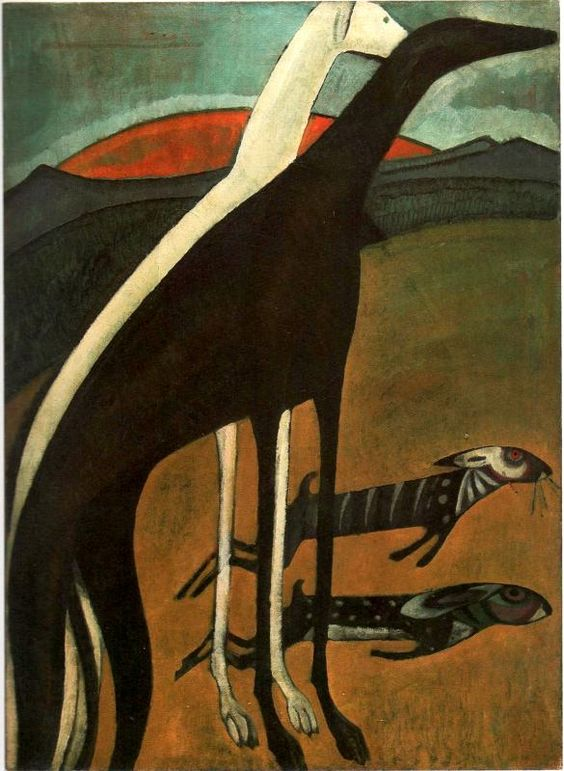
Os Galgos, c.1911

== Bibliography ==
- Alfaro, Catarina (2006). "Biografia de Amadeo de Souza-Cardoso: 1887-1918". Amadeo de Souza-Cardoso: diálogo de vanguardas. Lisbon: Fundação Calouste Gulbenkian. ISBN 978-972-635-185-6.
- Gonçalves, Rui-Mário (2011). "Amadeo de Souza-Cardozo: A Modernist Painter". In Dix, Steffen; Pizarro, Jerónimo (eds.). Portuguese Modernisms: Multiple Perspectives in Literature and the Visual Arts. Routledge. ISBN 9781351553605 – via Google Books.
- França, José Augusto (1972). Amadeo de Souza-Cardoso (2nd ed.). Editorial Inquérito.
- França, José-Augusto (1985). Amadeo e Almada. Lisbon: Bertrand Editora.
- França, José Augusto (1991). A Arte em Portugal no Século XX: 1911-1961. Lisbon: Bertrand Editora. ISBN 972-25-0045-7.
- Freitas, Maria Helena; et al. (2006). Amadeo de Souza-Cardoso. Avant-Garde Dialogues. Exhibition Catalogue. Lisbon: Calouste Gulbenkian Foundation.
