= Maria Velez =

Portuguese visual artist (1935–2017)

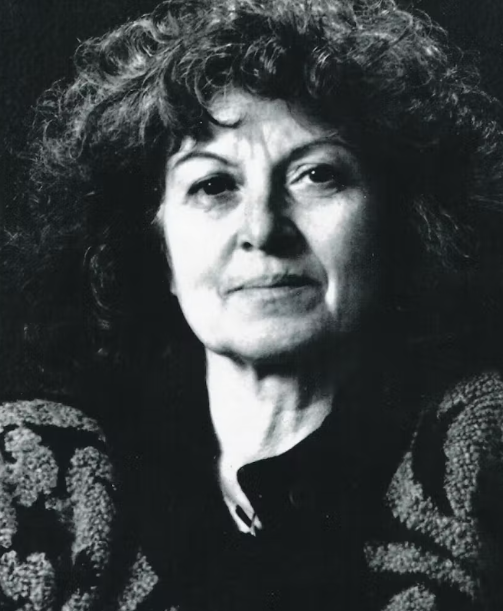
- Born: 1 November 1935; Lisbon, Portugal
- Died: 2 March 2017 (aged 81); Lisbon
- Known for: Painting, printmaking, fashion design, tapestry
- Spouse: Fernando Conduto

Maria Velez (November 1, 1935 — March 2, 2017) was a Portuguese contemporary artist who became well known for her paintings, engravings and tapestries. She was also a fashion designer and schoolteacher. Her vast body of work has been exhibited in many solo and group exhibitions and her paintings and tapestries are present in several museums and exhibited in numerous public spaces.

== Early life and education ==
Velez was born into a well-off family in the Portuguese capital of Lisbon on 1 November 1935. She suffered from health problems and did not go to school until she was ten, having a tutor at home, from whom she learnt French, English, and German. She attended high school at the Colégio do Sagrado Coração de Maria, a Catholic school in Lisbon. When she was 15, she wanted to study painting, but her mother (also a painter) advised her to first take a business course so as not to upset her father. While doing this she took night classes in drawing nude models at the National Society of Fine Arts (SNBA), accompanied by her brother, who also liked to draw. She entered the Lisbon School of Fine Arts (ESBAL) but found the course to be very academic. At the end of her first year, she went to Switzerland and worked in the studio of a well-known Bauhaus professor. Between 1956 and 1957, she attended a fashion design course at the Kunstgewerbeschule, a vocational arts school, in Zurich, while also working in the fashion department of the textile company Vollmoeller AG, in Uster. She completed the painting course at the Lisbon School of Fine Arts in 1961 with a grade of 18 out of 20.

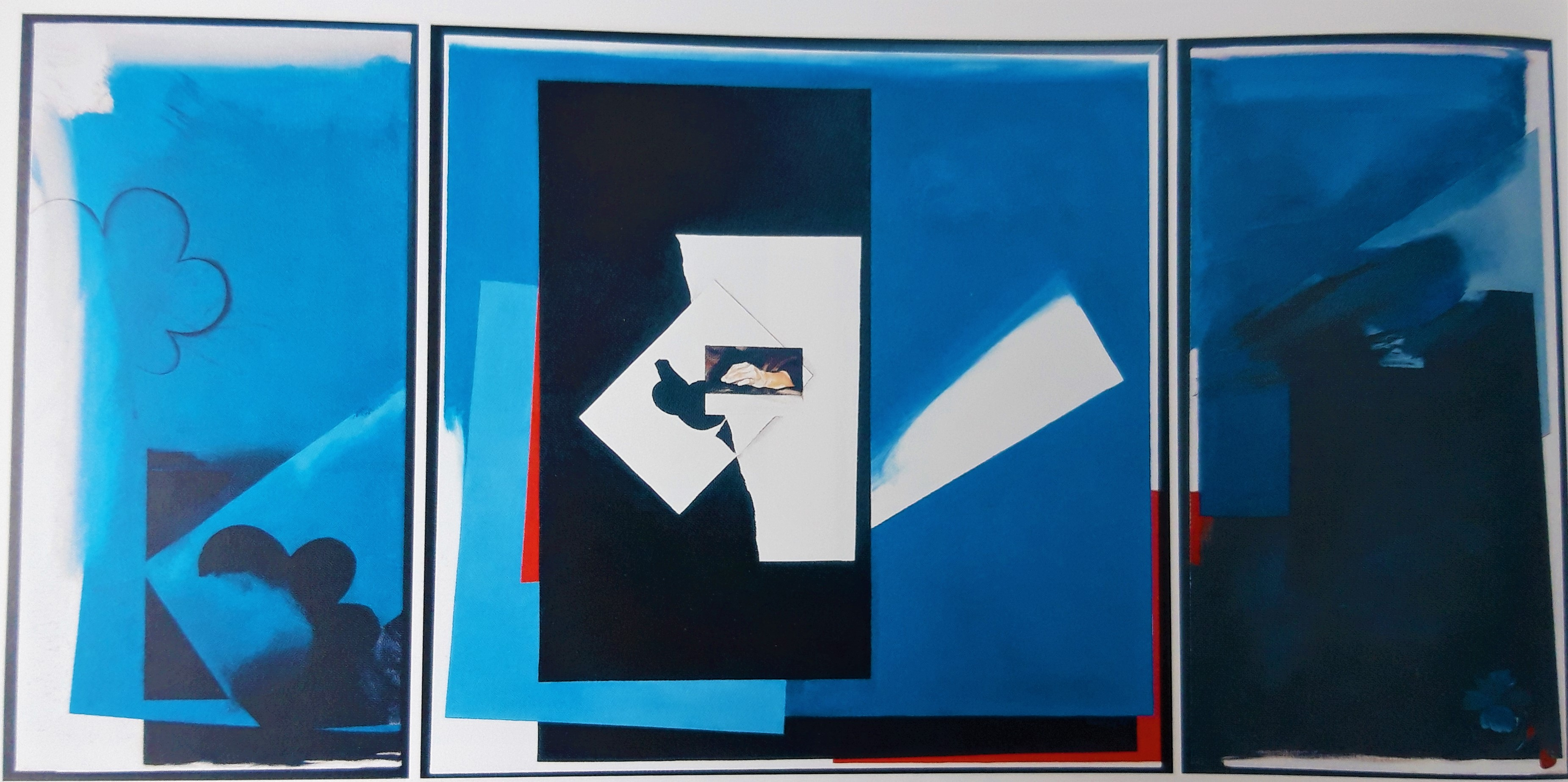
Tríptych, 1992 (Maria Velez)

In the years that followed, she spent time with noted Portuguese artists such as Sá Nogueira, Júlio Pomar, Alice Jorge, João Hogan, António Areal and many others. It was during this period that she met the sculptor, Fernando Conduto, whom she later married.

== Aesthetic influences and artistic movements ==
In 1962, she went to the Venice Biennale for the first time, and was deeply impressed by Robert Rauschenberg’s collages. At that time, she was exploring the work of Pablo Picasso, Georges Braque and Juan Gris. The relationships of Cubism with collage and abstract art influenced the direction in which her work developed. She began to practice linocuts, aquatints and etchings at the Cooperative Society of Portuguese Engravers, taking part in the Society's travelling exhibitions. Ideas for her work came from her closest cultural influences, such as the religious background of the Minho Province, home of her parents, and the farmers and objects of daily life of the Alentejo region.

== Career ==
From 1961, Velez became an intern teacher of professional technical education at the Escola Secundária Artística António Arroio and at the Escola Básica e Secundária Josefa de Óbidos, both in Lisbon. She also worked in her father's shop. After passing her teaching exam, she became a full-time teacher in 1963. From 1963 to 1965 she was director of the 5th Grade of the Industrial and Commercial School of Sintra in Agualva-Cacém. She worked as a fashion consultant for a commercial company from 1967. Between 1975 and 1978, she designed several fashion collections for the Industria Confeccionadora Portuguesa (Portuguese clothing industry). From 1983 to her mandatory government retirement age in 1995, she was a design assistant at the Faculty of Architecture of the University of Lisbon. In 1987 she published two books, titled Considerations on Basic Design and Study of the Perception of Space.

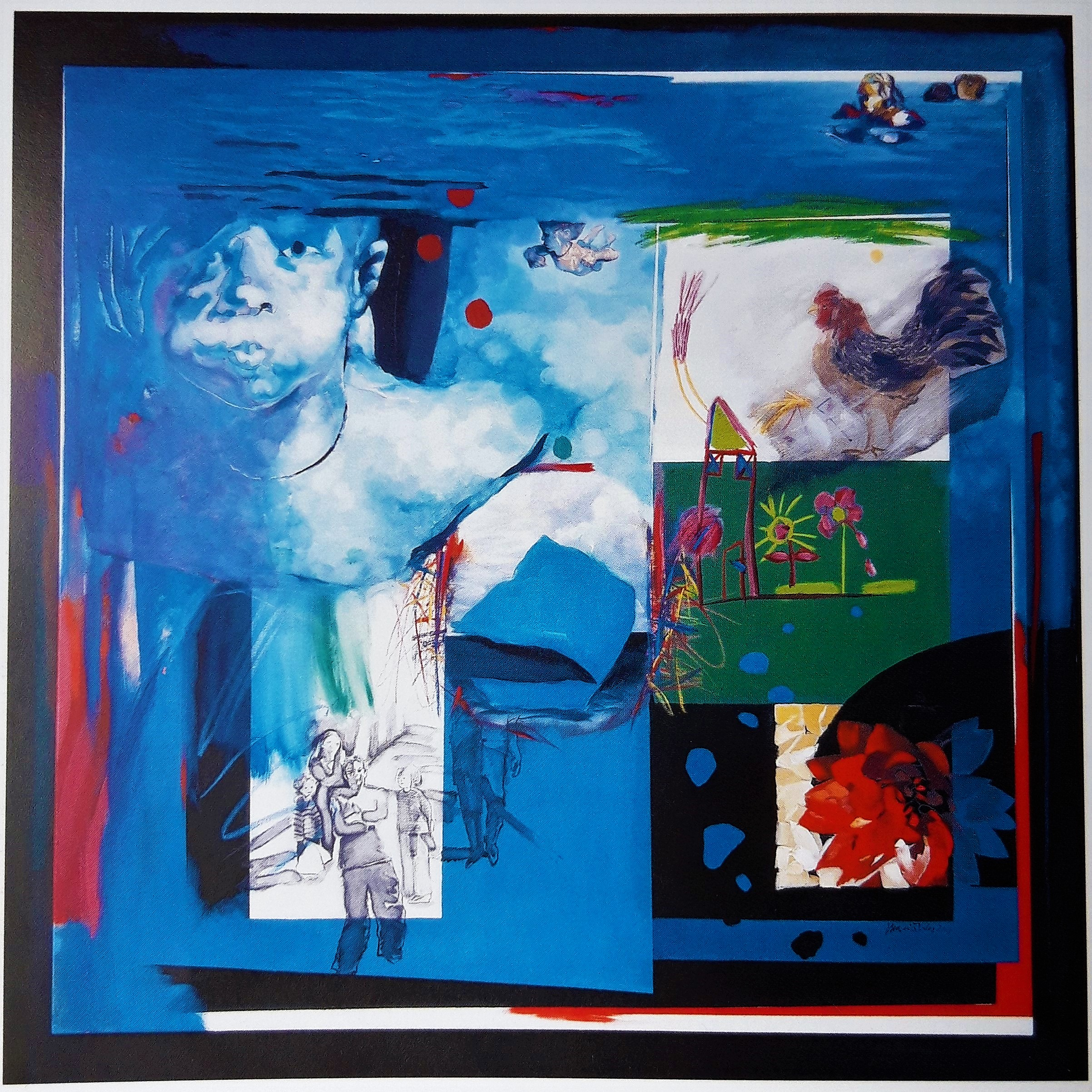
Glória Days I. Maria Velez, 2000

== Death ==
Velez died in hospital after a lengthy illness on 2 March 2017, at the age of 82.

== Exhibitions ==
Over the years, Velez participated in many solo and collective exhibitions. In Portugal, these included shows at the SNBA, and the Calouste Gulbenkian Museum. Internationally, she exhibited in Madrid, Tokyo, Rio de Janeiro, São Paulo, Brasília, Paris and London. A retrospective of her work, entitled A Tribute to Life, was held at the Cascais Cultural Centre in 2022, organized with the support of the Velez family.
