= List of Portuguese painters =

This is a list of Portuguese painters.

== A ==
- Jorge Afonso (c. 1470 – 1540)
- Nadir Afonso (1920–2013); see also Nadir Afonso artworks
- Almada Negreiros, José de: see under Negreiros: José de Almada Negreiros (1893–1970)
- Francisco Keil do Amaral, (1910–1975)
- Lino António (1898–1974)

== B ==
- Armando de Basto (1889–1923)
- Pedro Boese (born 1972)
- Carlos Botelho (1899–1982)
- Manuel Botelho (born 1950)

== C ==
- Pedro Calapez (born 1953)
- Nuno de Campos (born 1969)
- Amadeo de Souza Cardoso (1887–1918)
- Manuel Carmo (1958–2015)
- António Carneiro (1872–1930)
- Manuel Casimiro (born 1941)
- Cesariny de Vasconcelos, Mário: see under Vasconcelos: Mário Cesariny de Vasconcelos (1923–2006)
- Coelho, José Dias: see under Dias: José Dias Coelho (1923–1961)
- Domingos da Cunha, O Cabrinha (1598–1644)
- José da Cunha Taborda (1766–1836)

== D ==
- António Dacosta (1914–1990)
- José Dias Coelho (1923–1961)

== E ==
- Mário Eloy (1900–1951)

== F ==
- Garcia Fernandes (died c. 1565)
- Vasco Fernandes (c. 1475 – c. 1542)
- Cristóvão de Figueiredo (died c. 1540)
- António Manuel da Fonseca (1796–1890)
- Fonseca, Maria Inês Ribeiro da: see under Ribeiro: Maria Inês Ribeiro da Fonseca (1926–1995)

== G ==
- Luis Geraldes (born 1957)
- André Gonçalves (1685–1754)
- Nuno Gonçalves (15th century, second half)
- Gouveia, Ricardo: see under Rigo 23 (born 1966)

== H ==
- Francisco Henriques (died 1518)
- João Navarro Hogan (1914–1988)
- Francisco de Holanda (c. 1517 – 1585)

== J ==
- Manuel Jardim (1884–1923)

== K ==
- Alfredo Keil (1850–1907)
- Keil do Amaral, Francisco: see under Amaral: Francisco Keil do Amaral (1910–1975)

== L ==
- Fernando Lanhas (1923–2012)
- Cristóvão Lopes (c. 1516 – 1594)
- Gregório Lopes (c. 1490 – 1550)
- Cristobal López (died 1594)

== M ==
- José Malhoa (1855–1933)
- Abel Manta (1888–1982)
- João Abel Manta (born 1928)
- João Marques de Oliveira (1853–1927)
- Matos, Francisco Vieira de: see Vieira Portuense (1765–1805)
- Henrique Medina (1901–1988)
- Albuquerque Mendes (born 1953)
- Francisco Augusto Metrass (1825–1861)

== N ==
- José de Almada Negreiros (1893–1970)
- Sá Nogueira (1921–2002)

== O ==
- Josefa de Óbidos (1630–1684)
- Oliveira, João Marques: see under Marques: João Marques de Oliveira (1853–1927)

== P ==
- António Palolo (1946–2000)
- Columbano Bordalo Pinheiro (1857–1929)
- Júlio Pomar (1926–2018)
- Porto, António Carvalho de Silva: see under Silva Porto: António Carvalho de Silva Porto (1850–1893)
- Henrique Pousão (1859–1884)

== R ==
- Paula Rego (1935–2022)
- Pedro Cabrita Reis (born 1956)
- Maria Inês Ribeiro da Fonseca, (Menez) (1926–1995)
- Rigo 23 (born 1966 as Ricardo Gouveia)
- José Rodrigues (1828–1887)

== S ==
- Abel Salazar (1889–1946)
- Julião Sarmento (1948–2021)
- Domingos Sequeira (1768–1837)
- Silva, Maria Helena Vieira da: see under Vieira da Silva: Maria Helena Vieira da Silva (1908–1992)
- António Carvalho de Silva Porto (1850–1893)
- João Cristino da Silva (1829–1877)
- Adriano Sousa Lopes (1879–1944)
- Amadeo de Souza Cardoso (1887–1918)
- Aurélia de Souza (1867–1922)
- Sofia Martins de Sousa (1870–1960)

== V ==
- Mário Cesariny de Vasconcelos (1923–2006)
- Francisco Venegas (fl. 1578–1590)
- Marcelino Vespeira (1925–2002)
- Eduardo Viana (1881–1967)
- Maria Helena Vieira da Silva (1908–1992)
- Manuel Vilarinho (born 1953)

== X ==
- Xesko (born 1962)

== See also ==
- Culture of Portugal
