= National Society of Fine Arts =

Art institution in Portugal

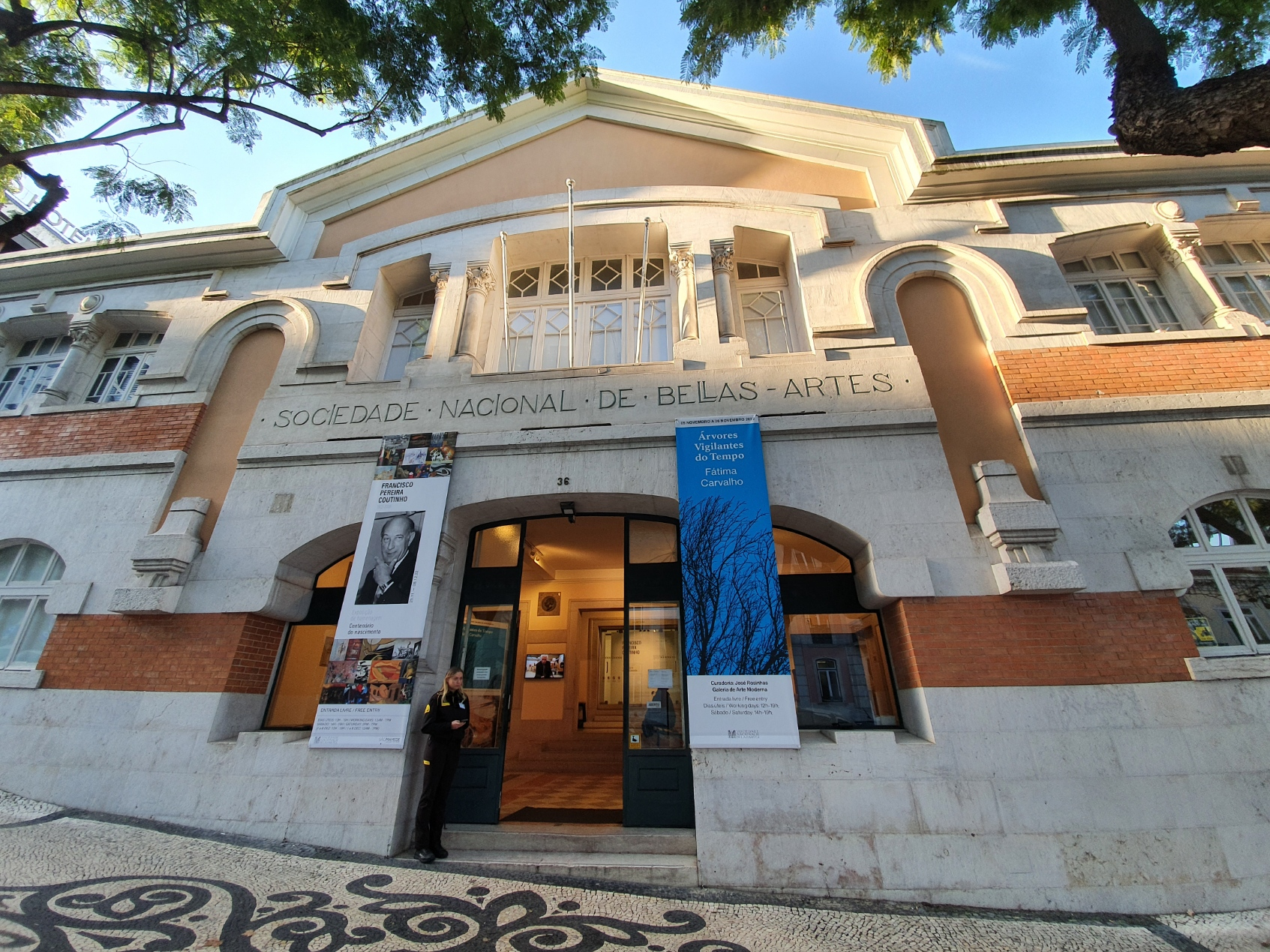
- Established: 1901; 125 years ago
- Location: Rua Barata Salgueiro 36, Lisbon, Portugal
- Coordinates: 38.721114°N 9.149451°W
- President: João Paulo Queiroz
- Website: snba.pt

The National Society of Fine Arts (Sociedade Nacional de Belas Artes - SNBA) is a Portuguese cultural association in Lisbon, founded on 16 March 1901, whose main objectives are to promote and assist the progress of art, to defend the interests of artists, particularly its members, and to cooperate with State and other organizations to develop the arts. The society has played a significant role in the development of the careers of many Portuguese painters, sculptors, architects, and visual artists.

Over the years the society has promoted free art courses (drawing, model drawing, painting, theory, and history of art, etc.). In 1965, it pioneered the teaching of the sociology of art and design in Portugal. Among other activities, it has hosted lecture series, conferences, and educational exhibitions on a broad range of themes, as well as exhibitions by members and book launches. It also holds a large collection of works of art and historical archives.

== History ==
The society's formation in 1901 resulted from the merger of two artists' associations, the Sociedade Promotora (1860) and the Grémio Artístico (1890). Its first president was the painter José Malhoa. Successive generations of Portuguese artists have first established themselves at the SNBA. In its early years these included Columbano Bordalo Pinheiro, Malhoa, and João Vaz. These were followed by people such as Veloso Salgado, the azulejo specialist Jorge Colaço, and António Teixeira Lopes.

Its building was designed by Álvaro Augusto Machado in 1906, and was officially opened in 1913 at Rua Barata Salgueiro 36, in Lisbon. It is a well-proportioned building with neo-Romanesque references and is equipped with a large exhibition hall or salon, measuring 50m. x 15m. The state paid for its construction and, in return, the SNBA agreed to collaborate with the government and to provide one work of art every year. The building is classified as a Property of Public Interest.

The SNBA did not just attract artists: by 1920, it also had many non-artist members, such as business people, musicians, poets, and art enthusiasts. Daytime and evening classes were being held alongside billiard tables and alternating with dances and festive events. At this time the tradition developed for more-experienced artists to offer training to beginners.

In the 1920s a "new generation" of more modern artists emerged but found their entry into the society barred by the then president, the architect Adães Bermudes. These included the "Independent Five", who were finally able to exhibit at the society in 1923. They were Dordio Gomes, Henrique Franco, Francisco Franco , Alfredo Miguéis and Diogo de Macedo and they extended invitations to three others, Eduardo Viana, Almada Negreiros and Mily Possoz, in an attempt to subvert the ban imposed by Bermudes. In 1925 Viana organised the 1st Autumn Salon at the society, contrasting it with the traditional annual Spring Salon that was organised by the management. Artists to exhibit included Francisco Smith, Clementina Carneiro de Moura, and Sarah Affonso. Architects also showed their work.

The society faced difficulties during the Estado Novo dictatorship (1930–1974). Two exhibitions of the National Secretariat of Information, directed by António Ferro, a supporter of António de Oliveira Salazar, were held at the SNBA in 1935 and 1936. However, artists began to fight back and in 1940 an exhibition was held of the work of Abel Salazar, an opponent of the government who had been banned from his work as a teacher of medicine at the University of Porto.

In 1946, the Comissão de Escritores, Jornalistas e Artistas Democráticos – Movimento de Unidade Democrática (CEJAD/MUD), organized the first of ten annual General Exhibitions of Plastic Arts (EGAP), which were held between 1946 and 1956, opening many of them symbolically on May 1st. The artistic works presented at these exhibitions included messages combating illiteracy, and those calling for people to register and vote. Artists contributing to various EGAPs included Júlio Pomar, Mário Dionísio, Álvaro Perdigão, Maria Keil, Francisco Keil do Amaral, Marcelino Vespeira, José Dias Coelho, Maria Barreira, Carneiro de Moura and her son, João Abel Manta, Carlos Botelho, Bartolomeu Cid dos Santos, and Lourdes Castro. During the 1947 EGAP, 11 paintings were seized by the Estado Novo's secret police, the PIDE. In 1948, at the 3rd EGAP, the Surrealists announced the withdrawal of 41 works in protest against censorship.

The EGAP was held every year except for 1952. In April of that year, the SNBA was closed down for almost one year by the Estado Novo following a confrontation between the conservative artist, Eduardo Malta, and a young radical sculptor José Dias Coelho, which led to Malta being expelled from the society. Coelho would, in 1961, be murdered in the street by the PIDE. A retrospective of his work was held in 1975, a year after the Carnation Revolution that overthrew the Estado Novo. The SNBA was reopened after the intervention of the painter António Conceição Silva and some of the founding members. In 1956, José-Augusto França organized the first "Salon of Today's Artists".

In January 1947, the National Council of Portuguese Women, then under the presidency of Maria Lamas, organized at the SNBA a Salon de Exposição de livros escritas por mulheres (Exhibition of Books Written by Women), with 3,000 books from around the world, as well as films and conferences. This led to the Council being closed down by the Estado Novo.

In 1959, the exhibition "50 Independent Artists" was held, featuring Conceição Silva, Fernando Azevedo, João Abel Manta, Jorge Vieira, and Júlio Pomar. The exhibition, which was designed in support of the candidature of Humberto Delgado for the presidency of Portugal, also introduced the next generation of Portuguese artists, such as Alice Jorge, António Areal, João Cutileiro, João Hogan, Lima de Freitas, Menez, and Sá Nogueira. In 1957 the society hosted the first exhibition of the new Calouste Gulbenkian Foundation. It hosted "British Art of the 20th Century" in 1962.

In 1965, a small Gallery of Modern Art was created in the basement, giving an exhibition space for artists such as Paula Rego, Helena Almeida, Maria Velez, and Graça Morais. Since then, the society has continued to present a range of exhibitions in both the main hall and the gallery, including retrospectives, contemporary art, and multidisciplinary art. In 2001 a commemorative exhibition was held to celebrate the society's centenary. In 2024 it held an exhibition to mark the 50th anniversary of the Carnation Revolution, with 50 members exhibiting pieces that they themselves had chosen.

== Courses ==
The society continues to offer many courses for budding artists. In 2025 these included:

- Artistic initiation
- History of art
- History of contemporary art
- Visual culture and image theory
- Aesthetics
- Theory and history of art criticism
- Religious art
- Women in art
- Photography
- Exhibition curation
- Drawing with model
- Study of colour
- Practical painting
- Illustration
- Printing techniques
- Contemporary drawing and design
- Sequential narrative illustration

== Honours and awards ==
In 1983 the SNBA was made an honorary member of the Order of Prince Henry. In 2004 it was made an honorary member of the Order of Liberty.
