= Maria Barreira =

Portuguese neorealist sculptor (1914–2020)

- Born: Maria Gonçalves Barreira; 7 December 1914; Lisbon, Portugal
- Died: 23 December 2010 (aged 96); Lisbon
- Occupation: Sculptor
- Years active: 70
- Known for: Neorealist sculpture

Maria Gonçalves Barreira (1914–2010) was a Portuguese sculptor, ceramicist, and teacher who was banned from teaching for 16 years by the Estado Novo dictatorship for her political activism.

== Early life and training ==
Barreira was born in Lisbon on 7 December 1914. She had originally hoped to be a doctor but in 1937 enrolled for the painting course at the Lisbon School of Fine Arts (ESBAL). After the first year she changed to the sculpture course. She later temporarily abandoned her studies to dedicate herself to anti-dictatorship activities, joining the Associação Feminina Portuguesa para a Paz (Portuguese Women's Association for Peace – AFPP) and the Movimento de Unidade Democrática (Movement of Democratic Unity – MUD). In 1951 she graduated in pedagogical sciences from the Faculty of Arts of the University of Lisbon, having realised that she could not live from sculpture alone. She became a temporary teacher at the Marquês de Pombal School in Lisbon but when she applied to become a permanent teacher she was rejected for political reasons and was banned from teaching in official education. During the 16 years she was banned she dedicated herself exclusively to sculpture, although in the 1950s she also taught night courses.

== Artistic career ==
In 1948 she married the sculptor Vasco Pereira da Conceição. He had been arrested in 1935 for opposition to the government and served time in three mainland prisons before being sent to Angra do Heroísmo in the Azores, where he was held for two years. Her training in sculpture ended in 1949 and she soon began to establish a reputation in the fields of both sculpture and ceramics. Her sculptures were frequently of women or of male and female couples, producing some works in partnership with her husband. Maternity wards were a recurring theme in her work. They both sculpted in an atelier on Rua da Alegria in Lisbon, which they shared with other artists such as José Malhoa, Alice Jorge and Júlio Pomar. When the building was sold to a car dealership the couple then began to continue their artistic work in "sheds" provided by the municipality.

In the company of Celestino Alves and João Hogan, she and her husband went to Paris for six months as scholarship holders from the Calouste Gulbenkian Foundation, giving them the opportunity to visit numerous galleries and exhibitions and come into direct contact with artists producing at the time, a factor that contributed decisively to their styles. The following year she participated in the exhibition "Two painters, two sculptors", held at the Sociedade Nacional de Belas Artes (National Society of Fine Arts).

Barreira worked with stone, metal and clay. Her work was sometimes compared to that of Henry Moore and she also admitted to having been influenced by Aristide Maillol and Henri Laurens. She and her husband were regular participants in the Exposições Gerais de Artes Plásticas (General Exhibition of Plastic Arts – EGAP). These exhibitions, which were seen as being in opposition to the cultural policy of the Estado Novo, took place between 1946 and 1956 and Maria Barreira not only exhibited her works but also collaborated in the conception and organization of the exhibitions. The second exhibition was visited by the security police of the Estado Novo, the PIDE, and 12 paintings considered "anti-national" and "subversive" were seized.

One series of her work was dedicated to the women of the fishing town of Nazaré, now a popular surfing location, after she was shocked by the hard life of its women. Works in the series include "Woman of Nazaré" (1959) "Woman on the beach" (1965) and "Three Women on the Beach" (1966). Barreira started to teach when permitted to do so in 1967, working as a drawing and visual education teacher, and continued doing so until 1981, when she retired at the age of 67. She then continued to dedicate herself to artistic production almost until her death.

== Death ==
Barreira died in Lisbon on 23 December 2010. She was buried in Bombarral cemetery, together with her husband. Her intellectual estate and that of her husband were donated by the couple to the municipality of Bombarral, the birth town of her husband, in 1990, two years before his death. The museum that houses their work is now known as Bombarral Municipal Museum – Vasco P. da Conceição/Maria Barreira. She is also represented in several collections and museums, including the Museum of Neo-Realism in Vila Franca de Xira, the National Museum of Contemporary Art and the Calouste Gulbenkian Museum in Lisbon, and the Teixeira Lopes de Mirandela Museum in Mirandela.
