= Pedro Cabrita Reis =

Portuguese artist

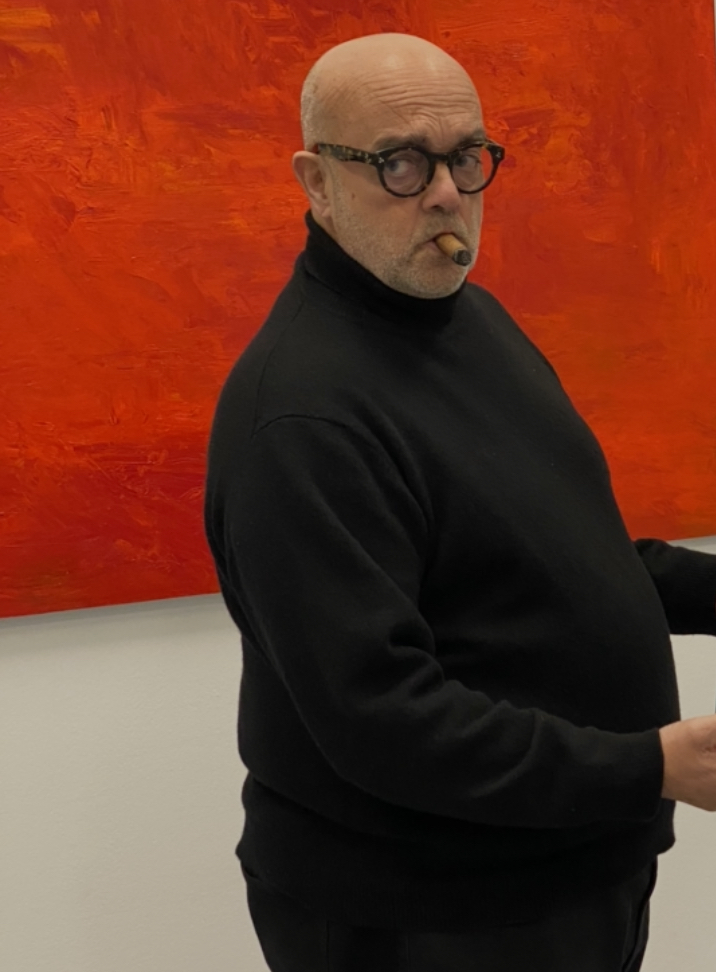
- Born: 1956|09|5 - 67 years Lisbon, Portugal
- Known for: Painting, sculpture, drawing, photography

Pedro Cabrita Reis (born September 5, 1956) is one of the foremost visual artists of his generation and also one of Portugal’s most internationally renowned artists. His work features a wide variety of media – painting, sculpture, photography and drawing – and has been exhibited and included in numerous national and international museum collections. He lives and works in Lisbon.

== Career ==
Cabrita Reis studied at the Faculty of Fine Arts at the University of Lisbon. His first solo exhibition, “25 Desenhos” [25 Drawings], was held at the National Society of Fine Arts in Lisbon in 1981. While at university, he founded and directed the magazine Arte Opinião [Art Opinion] (1978-1982).

In 1987, he held his first international solo exhibition, “Anima et Macula”, at Cintrik Gallery in Antwerp. Since then, he has taken part in important international exhibitions including documenta IX and XIV in Kassel (1992 and 2017) and the 21st and 24th São Paulo Biennials (1994 and 1998).

Cabrita Reis has also participated in various iterations of the Venice Biennale. He represented Portugal with Rui Chafes and José Pedro Croft in 1995, took part in Aperto at the 1997 Venice Biennale at Germano Celant’s invitation, represented Portugal at the 2003 Venice Biennale and also showed another work on the same occasion at the Giardini at the invitation of Francesco Bonami.

In 2009, he participated in the 10th Lyon Biennial, “Le Spectacle du Quotidien”, with the work Les Dormeurs. Returning to Venice in 2013, he presented A Remote Whisper in a solo show at the Palazzo Falier.

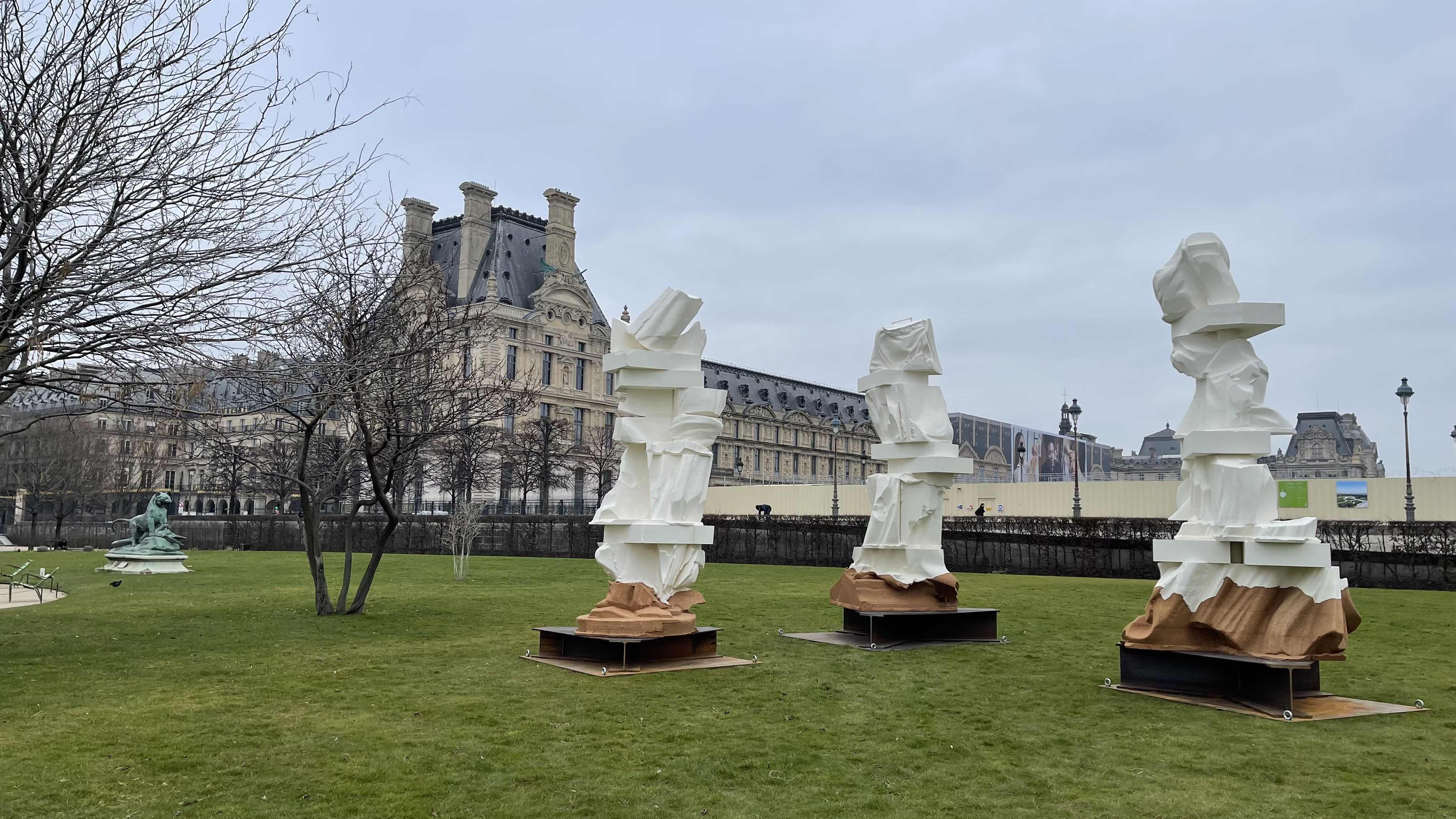
Les Trois Grâces by Pedro Cabrita Reis (2022), Louvre Museum

In February 2022, at the invitation of the Louvre Museum and to mark the opening of the France-Portugal 2022 Season, he presented Les Trois Grâces in the Tuileries Garden, an artwork comprises three cork sculptures each of which is around 4.5 m in height and 500 kilos in weight supported on an iron base weighing around 400 kilos. In 2022, Cabrita Reis will also make a return to Venice for the 59th Biennale, where he will present Field, a large-scale piece designed for the Chiesa di San Fantin.

On 19 May 2024, he inaugurated his largest ever solo exhibition, "Atelier", celebrating 50 years of work, a retrospective that brought together more than 1500 works from his personal collection made since the early 1970s, including almost two dozen that were made during the exhibition's assembly. The show occupied eight Mitra pavilions in Lisbon and was visited by 17801 people by 28 July, the closing date.

Cabrita Reis’s career includes numerous solo and group exhibitions. His artworks are also featured in the collections of many national and international museums, prominent amongst which are the Gulbenkian, Tate Modern, The Arts Club of Chicago, Hamburger Kunsthalle, Serralves, MAAT (Lisbon), S.M.A.K. (Ghent), Centre Pompidou, Culturgest (Lisbon), IVAM, CAC Málaga, Museu Berardo (Lisbon), Kunst Museum Winterthur, Museo Jumex, Ontario Art Gallery (Toronto), MUCEM, MoMA PS1 and Museo Reina Sofia.

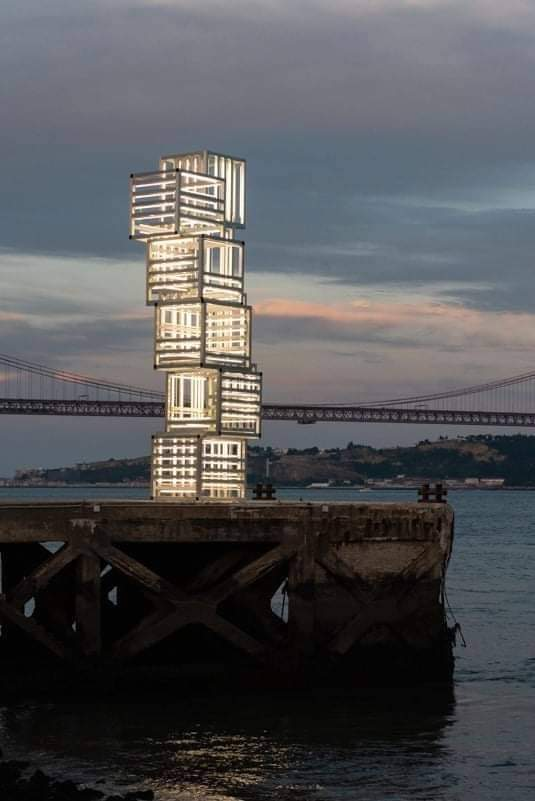
Central Tejo by Pedro Cabrita Reis (2018), Lisbon

Cabrita Reis has also created various public artworks in Portugal including Central Tejo in Lisbon (2018), Palácio [Palace] in Porto (2005), Da Cor das Flores [The Colour of Flowers] at Bemposta Dam in Mogadouro (2001), A Linha do Mar [The Tide Line] in Leça da Palmeira (2019), Castelo [Castle] in Vila Nova da Barquinha (2012) and Neptuno [Neptune] in Faro (2020). Two of his public pieces can still be seen in Austria: Two drawings in the sky, two paintings underneath in Vienna (2013) and Assembly in Graz (2022).

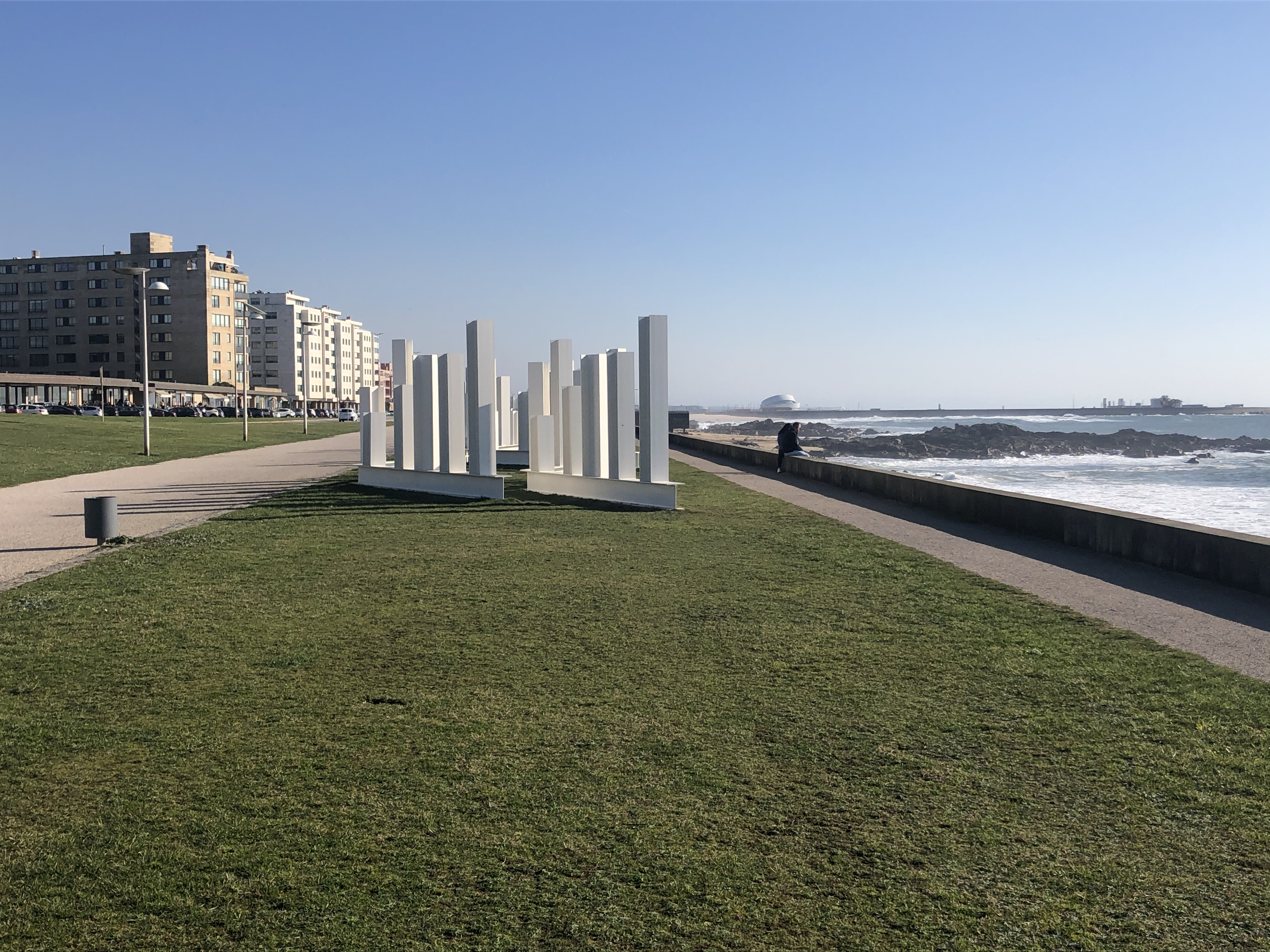
A Linha do Mar by Pedro Cabrita Reis (2020), Leça da Palmeira

His influence can also be felt in music. He created the cover for the album Acústico [Acoustic] by the Portuguese musician Júlio Pereira (1994), painted a watercolour for Quando se ama loucamente [When You Love Madly], an album by the fado singer Aldina Duarte (2017), and the cover for the album tudo recomeça [everything begins again] by Aldina Duarte, released in March 2022.

== Collector and curator ==
From the 1990s, Cabrita Reis began collecting Portuguese art and amassed 388 works by 74 artists representative of the “90s Generation”. In 2015, the foundation of the Portuguese electricity company EDP acquired this collection, “one of the most significant collections of Portuguese contemporary art from the last decade of the 20th century and the first of the 21st century. “Germinal”, the first exhibition of the “Pedro Cabrita Reis Collection”, was first shown at the Galeria Municipal do Porto in 2018, followed that same year by a show in Lisbon at MAAT – Museum of Art, Architecture and Technology which included artworks by over thirty artists.

In 2019, Marina Bairrão Ruivo, the director of the Museu Arpad Szenes – Vieira da Silva, in Lisbon, invited Cabrita Reis to curate the exhibition “Metade do Céu” [Half of the Sky] featuring the work of 60 female artists to celebrate the institute’s 25th anniversary.

== Documentaries ==
Two documentaries have been made about Cabrita Reis. The Portuguese filmmaker Teresa Villaverde made the film A Favor da Claridade [In Favour of Clarity] for the 50th Venice Biennale (2004) and Abílio Leitão (director) and Alexandre Melo filmed Pedro Cabrita Reis (2012), “a vision of his work as a whole over the last 30 years”. Cabrita Reis has also acted in several films (see filmography).

== (Selected) Solo exhibitions ==
- "Atelier", Mitra, Lisbon, 2024
- "Wunderkammer", Buchmann Galerie, Berlin, 2024
- “Field”, Chiesa de San Fantin, for the 59th Venice Biennale, 2022
- “Les Trois Grâces”, Tuileries Garden, Paris, 2022
- “Cabrita – Cabinet d’amateur”, CAC Malaga, Malaga, 2020
- “A roving gaze”, Serralves, Porto 2019
- “Work (always) in progress”, CGAC, Santiago de Compostela 2019
- “Pedro Cabrita Reis”, Mai 36 Galerie, Zurich 2019
- “Pedro Cabrita Reis – La Forêt (Marseille)”, MUCEM, Marseille 2018
- “Col-Lecció per Amor a L’Art. Ornament = Delicte?”, Bombas Gens Centre d’Art, Valencia 2017
- “Parcours”, Art Basel, Basel’s Münsterplatz, Basel 2017
- “Das pequenas coisas”, Atelier-Museu Júlio Pomar, Lisbon 2017
- “Art Unlimited / Basel 2016”, Halls Messe Basel, Hall 2.1, Basel 2016
- “Show me your wound – TEFAF Maastricht”, Maastricht Exhibition and Congress Centre (MECC) 2016
- “Fallen and Standing”, Kewenig Galerie, Palma de Mallorca, 2016
- “A casa de Coimbra – anozero’15 – um lance de dados, Bienal de Arte Contemporânea de Coimbra”, Sala da Cidade, Refeitório do Convento de Santa Cruz, Coimbra, 2015
- “La casa di Roma – L’Albero della Cuccagna”, MAXXI – Museo Nazionale delle Arti del XXI secolo, Rome, 2015
- “Pedro Cabrita Reis”, Konkrete Mehr Raum!, Osnabrück, 2015
- “Pedro Cabrita Reis”, Kewenig Galerie, Berlin, 2015
- “A few drawings, a façade inside and a possible staircase”, The Arts Club, Chicago, 2015
- “Les lieux fragmentés”, Hotel des Arts, Toulon, 2015
- “Herbarium (Madrid)”, Galeria Juana de Aizpuru, Madrid, 2015
- “The Field”, Peter Freeman Inc., New York, 2014
- “The London angles”, Sprovieri Gallery, London, 2014
- “Fourteen paintings, the preacher and a broken line”, The Power Plant, Toronto, 2014
- “Alguns nomes”, Galeria Mul.ti.plo, Rio de Janeiro, 2014
- “Lifted Gaze”, De Vleeshal, Middelburg, 2014
- “A Remote Whisper”, Palazzo Falier, Venice, 2013
- “States of Flux – Pedro Cabrita Reis”, Tate Modern, London, 2011-2013
- “One after another, a few silent steps” (itinerary exhibition), Hamburger Kunsthalle, Hamburg, 2009 - Carré D’Art, Nîmes, 2010 - Museum for Contemporary Art, Leuven, 2011 – Museu Colecção Berardo, Lisbon, 2011
- “Deposição”, Pinacoteca de São Paulo, 2010
- “La Línea del Volcán", Museo Tamayo, Mexico City, 2009
- "Pedro Cabrita Reis”, Fondazione Merz, Turin, 2008
- “True Gardens #6”, Kunsthaus Graz, Graz, 2008
- “La ciudad de adentro”, OPA, Guadalajara, 2007
- “Pedro Cabrita Reis”, MACRO, Museo d'Arte Contemporanea, Rome, 2006
- “True Gardens #3 (Dijon)”, FRAC Bourgogne, Dijon, 2004
- “Stillness”, Camden Arts Centre, London, 2004
- “Sometimes one can see the clouds passing by”, Kunsthalle Bern, 2004

== Filmography ==
- 1986: Repórter X by José Nascimento
- 1988: Tempos Difíceis by João Botelho
- 1994: Três Irmãos by Teresa Villaverde
- 1994: Três Palmeiras by João Botelho
- 2018: Mar by Margarida Gil
