= João Vaz =

Portuguese painter and decorator

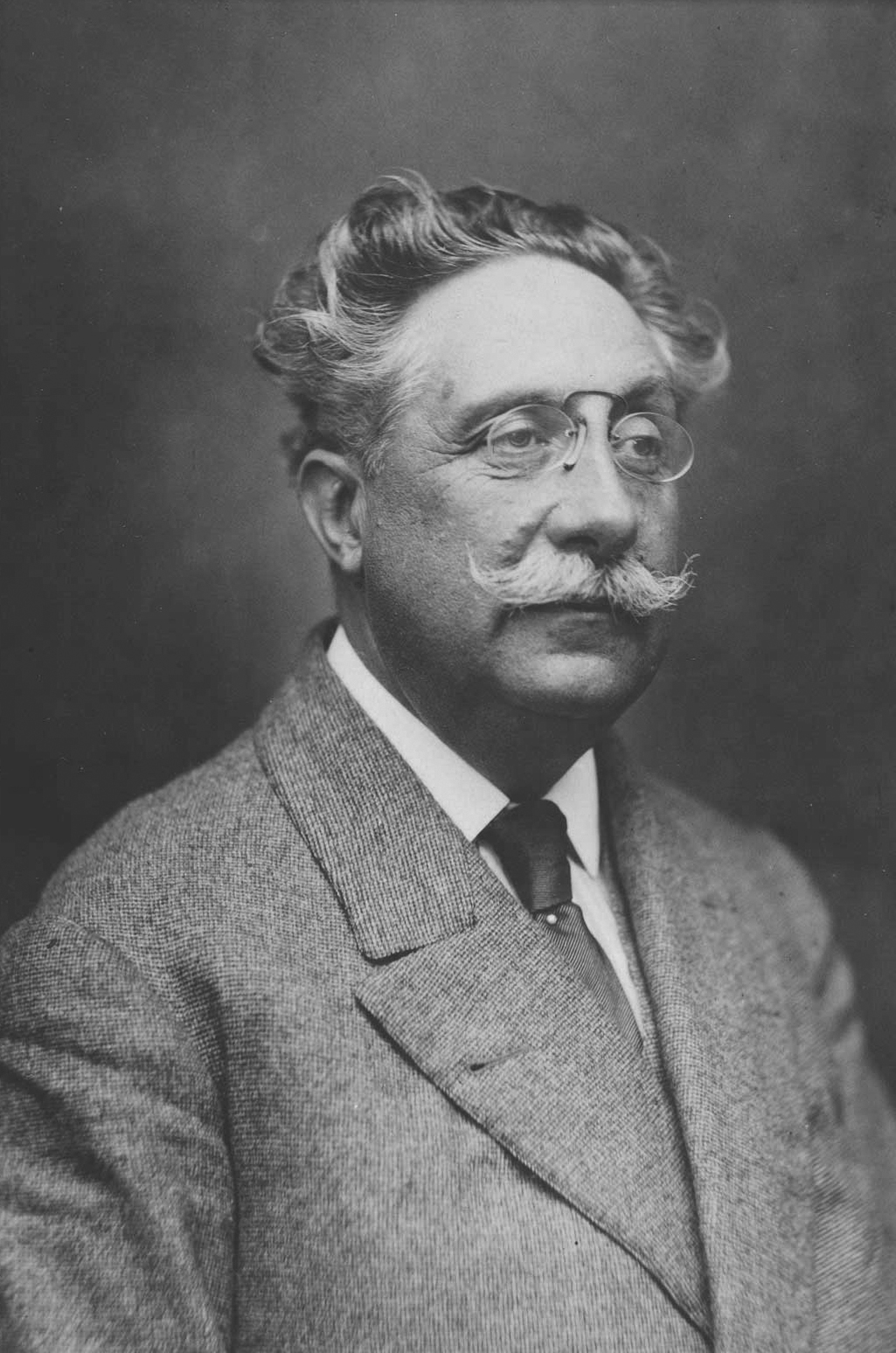
- João Vaz (Nogueira da Silva Museum, after 1900)
- Born: 9 March 1859; Setúbal, Portugal
- Died: 17 February 1931 (aged 71); Lisbon, Portugal
- Notable work: Media related to João Vaz at Wikimedia Commons
- Movement: Naturalism

João José Vaz (9 March 1859, in Setúbal – 17 February 1931, in Lisbon) was a Portuguese painter and decorator who specialized in maritime subjects.

== Biography ==
In 1872, he enrolled at the "Academia das Belas-Artes" (now part of the University of Lisbon), where he studied under António da Silva Porto. He graduated six years later. In 1881, he held his first exhibition at the Lisbon Geographic Society. Later, he exhibited more widely, including displays at the "Sociedade Promotora de Belas-Artes", the Artists' Guild and the Sociedade Nacional de Belas-Artes. He was also a member of the "Lion's Group", an informal association of artists and writers who met in the Golden Lion Tavern with the goal of promoting Naturalism in the arts.

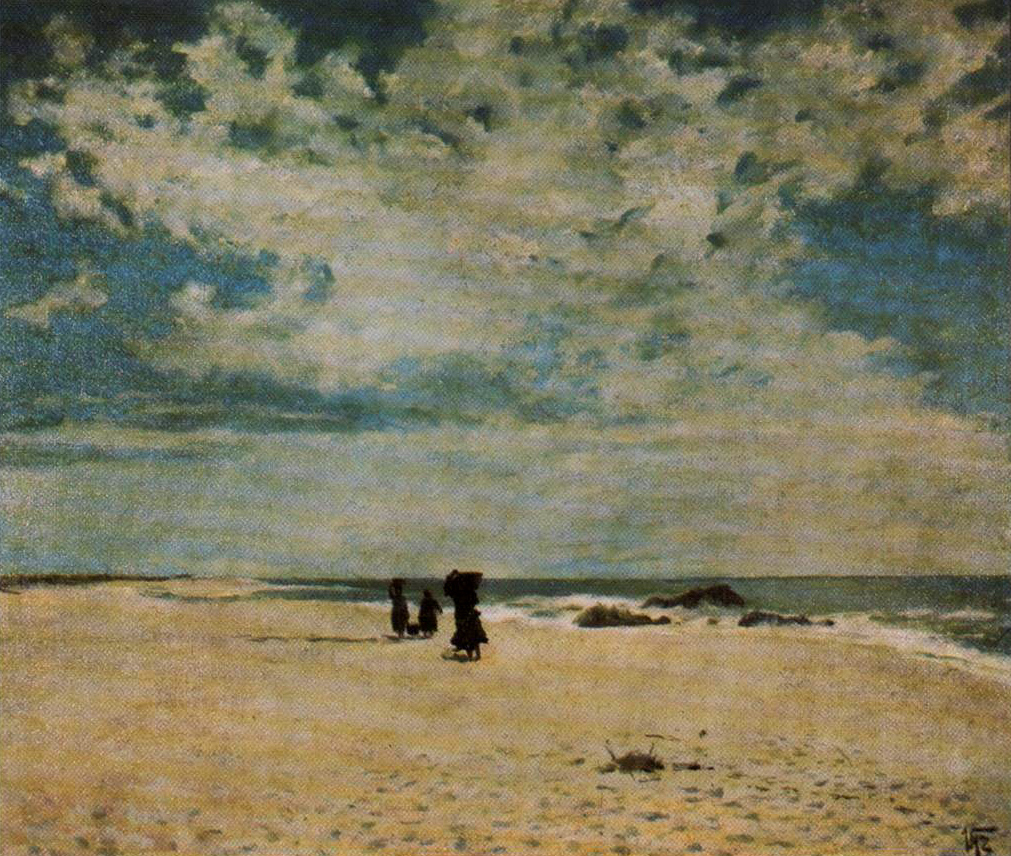
On the Beach (date unknown)

He was especially well known for his maritime paintings and provided illustrations for several magazines, including Branco e Negro (1896-1898), Atlantida (1915-1920) and Contemporânea (1915-1926).

In 1884, he became a Professor at the "Escola Industrial Afonso Domingues" (named after a 14th-century architect), where he was later promoted to Director. In 1912, he served on a government commission to establish new curricula for commercial and industrial education in the primary and secondary schools. Two years later, he inaugurated the new system at the "Escola de Desenho Industrial de Setúbal".

In addition to his canvases, he provided decorations for many public and private buildings, including the meeting room of the Assembly of the Republic, the Garcia de Resende Theater in Évora, the Buçaco Palace Hotel and the Belém Palace. He also created designs for commemorative postage stamps.
