= Sofia Areal =

Portuguese artist (born 1960)

Sofia Areal (born in Lisbon, 4 June 1960) is a Portuguese abstract painter, whose works adhere mostly to organic non-geometrical forms and a strong chromatic focus. Besides painting and drawing, Areal's work involves collage, textile design, and scenography.

== Biography ==
Areal was born in Lisbon in 1960, daughter of the painter António Areal (1934-1978) and Maria Lira dos Passos Freitas Pereira (born 1937). She is the second of four sisters. Her father, besides being a painter, wrote several essays plus books on criticism and poetry. The mother, also an artist, has a course in sculpture and currently dedicates herself to drawing. The paternal grandfather, Joaquim Santiago Areal e Silva, was an architect and, together with Jorge Segurado, was one of those responsible for the restoration of national monuments in the 1950s. On the maternal side of the family, from the island of Madeira, the great-grandfather and the grandmother, linked to the arts, had studied in England. Areal grew up between Lisbon, Funchal, Azores and Mozambique.

Areal began her artistic training in the UK, where she attended the Textile Design course (1978-1979) and the Foundation Course (1979-1980) at the Hertfordshire College of Art & Design in St Albans. Upon returning to Portugal, she attended, between 1981 and 1983, the painting and drawing workshops at AR.CO, in Lisbon. She was a student of Rogério Ribeiro, António Sena and José Mouga. Besides painting and drawing, Areal developed her art in the fields of illustration, graphic design and set design. In 1982, she married the sculptor Rui Sanches, with whom she lived for 20 years and with whom she had a son, the artist Martim Brion.

Although she presented her work in group exhibitions throughout the 1980s, it was mainly from the invitation made by Alda Cortez to show at her gallery in 1990 that Areal started a regular dynamic in the public presentation of her works, which she has maintained until the present day.

== Work ==
Sofia Areal started her training in England, taking the course in textile design and the foundation course at the Hertfordshire College of Art and Design, St Albans (1979–81), before continuing her studies in Portugal at Ar.Co engraving and painting workshops in Lisbon. She has participated in collective exhibitions since 1982 and held individual exhibitions since 1990. In addition to paintings and drawings, she also works in illustration and scenography.

Areal’s research into forms and light brings painting and drawing into very close proximity where the dividing line mainly appears in the supporting material. Different techniques do not create rupture. Except for oil, acrylic (which she also uses on her canvases) is also involved in her work, in close association with coloured pencils, India ink, watercolours, graphite and collage. While colour is stronger in her painting, it is always present in her drawings, jus as the textured lines of wax crayon or coloured pencil also appear on her canvases. In both forms, she searches for a spatial balance that is seen as a harmony between occupied and empty spaces, opacity and transparency within a graphic game of contrasts, what Sonia Delaunay called simultaneous. Indeed her work and Areal’s share some significant similarities. Created using a vibrant palette dominated by shades of black, white, red and yellow, combined with blues and greens, they create tension with the fragile lines that are superimposed on areas of colour, turning the act of painting and drawing into means of writing and rewriting the world. Her work challenges it, records it and reworks it in bipolar form, bringing us face to face with primordial forces, safe within the maelstrom of her intuitive and immediate creative act, which makes it similar to the Surrealist way of creating. Yet this quality does not eliminate the hesitations surrounding her artistic thinking. The format of the canvases also underlines her research her research into the ways of balancing night and day, Dionysus and Apollo, ranging from rectangles to circular tondos. The latter, cunningly fulfilling their function as targets, establish themselves as metaphors for the attention required by observing and creating. Indeed, apart from the material supports (which in the case of her drawings, are long sheets that already mimic the lined notebooks where people write), the backgrounds also act as a statement of energy, suggesting an Oriental-style precision of complements and completeness. Moreover, the lines or the texture, which appear over these backgrounds in nervy veins whose dynamism is apparent in the funneling or increasing density that manages to metamorphose into areas, underline the presence of those forces and their necessary and wise fruition and effort.

== Exhibitions (selection) ==
Sofia Areal has exhibited her work in collective exhibitions since 1982 and individually since 1990.

Solo Exhibitions (selection):

2016 – “Restlessly: Variations on the same theme”, João Esteves de Oliveira Gallery, Lisbon, Portugal

2015 - “How utterly shameless – Bite with all the teeth you have in your tongue”, Politecnica Theatre, Artistas Unidos, Lisbon, Portugal

2014 - “113o 55’E 21o 11’N”, Casa Garden, Macao S.A.R., China.

2011 - “Yes”, anthological exhibition of the last ten years, Cordoaria Nacional, Galeria do Torreão Nascente, Lisbon, Portugal.

2009 “An Anti-pain practice”, Pró-Évora Group, Évora, Portugal.

2006 “360 degrees in the SUN”, Museu de Arte Contêmporanea do Funchal, now MUDAS Madeira Museum of Contemporary Art, Madeira, Portugal.

2002 “Sofia Areal about João Miguel Fernandes Jorge's notebooks”, Casa da Cerca - Contemporary Art Centre, Almada, Portugal.

2000 “Some of mine mine”, Casa da Cerca - Contemporary Art Centre, Almada, Portugal.

1993 “Painting and drawing by Sofia Areal”, J.M. Gomes Alves Gallery, Guimarães, Portugal.

1990 “Sofia Areal”, Alda Cortez Gallery, Lisbon, Portugal.

Group (selection):

2016 “Approximations”, A.N.A. Museum, Lisbon, Portugal

2013 "Re-Encounters" – Sofia Areal, Álvaro Lapa, Nikias Skapinakis, Manuel Casimiro, Jorge Martins, Neupergama Gallery, Torres Novas, Portugal.

2010 “Four”, Sofia Areal, Manuel Casimiro, Jorge Martins e Nikias Skapinakis, Giefarte Gallery, Lisbon, Portugal. (continued in 2011 at the Aveiro Municipal Museum, Sines Cultural Centre and Centro Cultural de Cascais).

2006 "26 Years, 26 Artists, 104 Originals”, Neupergama Gallery, Torres Novas, Portugal.

2005 "15 years of the gallery", JM Gomes Alves Gallery, Guimarães, Portugal.

2000 “Paula Rego, Lourdes Castro, Sofia Areal and Ana Vidigal”, Museu de Arte Contêmporanea do Funchal, now MUDAS Madeira Museum of Contemporary Art, Madeira, Portugal.

1999 “Lines of Shadow”, curated by João Miguel Fernandes Jorge and Helena de Freitas, CAM - José de Azeredo Perdigão Modern Art Centre, Calouste Gulbenkian Foundation, Lisboa, Portugal.

1994 “When the World Falls on top of us: Art in times of AIDS”, Belém Cultural Centre, Lisbon, Portugal.

1993 “E.C.'s Young Artists”, curated by João Lima Pinharanda, Seoul, South Korea.

1990 “Iberian Exhibition of Modern Art”, EIAM’90, curated by João Luis Pinharanda, Caceres and Badajoz, Spain.

1989 “First Quarter”, textiles designed by plastic artists, Pena National Palace, Sintra, Portugal.

1984 “New New”, National Beaux Arts Society, Lisbon, Portugal.

== Collections ==
Areal is represented in various institutional collections, among others:

José de Azeredo Perdigão Modern Art Centre of Calouste Gulbenkian Foundation, Lisbon. Casa da Cerca - Centro de Arte Contemporânea, Almada. Elvas Contemporary Art Museum, Elvas. António Cachola Collection, Elvas. MUDAS Contemporary Art Museum of Madeira, Madeira. A.N.A. Collection, Lisbon. FEVAL, Cáceres. Carmona e Costa Foundation, Lisbon. Orient Foundation, Macau. Fundação D. Luís I, Cascais. Serralves Foundation, Porto. PLMJ Foundation, Lisbon. Millennium BCP Foundation, Lisbon. Novo Banco, Lisbon. Banif Mais, Lisbon. NovaCaixa Galicia, Vigo. Palmela City Council, Palmela. Ponta Delgada City Council. Ponte de Sor Municipal Library, Ponte de Sor. Vodafone Collection, Lisbom. Leal Rios Foundation, Lisbon.

== Film ==
In 2016 a documentary by Jorge Silva Melo, entitled Sofia Areal: An Anti-Pain Practice was premiered at the São Luíz National Theatre in Lisbon. The documentary focuses on Areal's work and work practice, mostly filmed in the artist's studio over aSIlvaod of six years. The film was co-production Artistas Unidos and RTP.

In 2015, Jorge Silva Melo made a documentary about his own work, entitled, "We have not finished yet", which refers to many of the artists Silva Melo has worked with throughout the years.

Solveig Nordlung made in 2013 a five-episode documentary series about five different women, one of them Sofia Areal entitled "Talks in the hairdresser" for RTP. One of the other interviewees was Leonor Keil, who is one of Areal's sisters.

== Monographs and catalogues ==
Areal's work has been subject to various analyses throughout her career, mostly in the press and in the catalogues of her exhibitions. With texts by among others: João Miguel Fernandes Jorge, João Lima Pinheiranda, Rui Mário Gonçalves, Jorge Silva Melo, Eduarda Dionísio, Isabel Carlos, Bernardo Pinto Ribeiro, Emília Ferreira, Ana Sousa Dias, José Luís Porfírio, ou Nelson Dimaggio. Areal has also written in several occasions about her own work.

In 2011, when of anthological the exhibition "Yes" a book with texts by, Emília Ferreira, Jorge Silva Melo, Luís Campos e Cunha with an interview by Ana Sousa Dias was published by Athena/Babel Publishers. In the same year, an interview was also published in "Portugal between generations: new reflexions about the future of the country" edited by Almerinda Romeira and also by Centauro. 2012, Areal illustrates the Magazine Colóquio Letras published by Gulbenkian Foundation. In 2013 Areal and Allan Hobson an American Emeritus Harvard Professor join texts and painting to launch a book titled "Creativity", it was published by ISPA.

Other books, include the recent book launched by Bernardo Pinto de Almeida "Arte Portuguesa no Século XX - Uma História Crítica in the end of 2016. Or the illustrations of the book "Papeis de Fumar" by Virgéilio Alberto Vieira and Jorge Silva Melo's book "Século Passado".
