= DaCosta =

DaCosta may refer to:

== People ==
- António Dacosta (1914–1990), Portuguese painter and poet
- Morton DaCosta (1914–1989), American theatre and film director, film producer, writer, and actor
- Nia DaCosta (born 1989), American film director, screenwriter, and producer
- Noel DaCosta (1929–2002), Nigerian-Jamaican composer, jazz violinist, and choral conductor
- Sagarika DaCosta (born 1970), Indian-Italian singer and actress
- Yaya DaCosta (born 1982), American actress and fashion model
- Dacosta Goore (born 1984), Ivorian football defender

== Other uses ==
- DaCosta, New Jersey, an unincorporated community
- Martin DaCosta, fictional character from the Japanese SF anime television series Mobile Suit Gundam SEED
