= Teresa Magalhães =

Portuguese painter (1944–2023)

- Born: Maria Teresa Marques Magalhães; 11 March 1944; Lisbon, Portugal
- Died: 19 October 2023 (aged 79); Lisbon, Portugal
- Education: Escola Superior de Belas-Artes de Lisboa
- Occupation: Painter

Maria Teresa Marques Magalhães (11 March 1944 – 19 October 2023) was a Portuguese painter. She received an award from the President of Portugal and was named a Grand Officer of the Order of Prince Henry in 2004.

== Biography ==
Born in Lisbon on 11 March 1944, Magalhães graduated from the Escola Superior de Belas-Artes of Lisbon. She received a scholarship from the Calouste Gulbenkian Foundation from 1976 to 1979 and was part of the "5+1" group alongside Virgílio Domingues, João Hogan, Júlio Maria dos Reis Pereira, Guilherme Parente, and her eventual husband, Sérgio Pombo.

In 1990, Magalhães curated the exhibition "Portuguese Painters of the 20th Century" at the Municipal Council of Macau. In 1996, she created two tile panels at Martin Place railway station in Sydney.

Teresa Magalhães died of pneumonia in Lisbon on 19 October 2023, at the age of 79.
