= Maria Jose Paschoal =

Portuguese actress

- Education: Lisbon School of Fine Arts; Lisbon Theatre and Film School
- Occupation: Actor
- Awards: Golden Globe (Portugal) - 2009; Golden Globe (Portugal) - 2014

Maria José Paschoal (born 1956, Horta), also Maria José Pascoal, is a Portuguese actress, who is distinguished in both theatre and television. She was awarded Golden Globes for Best Theatre Actress in 2009 and 2014. She has a degree in Architecture from the Lisbon School of Fine Arts, and continued her education with at the School of Theatre and Cinema of the National Conservatory of Lisbon (pt). She spent eight years at the Teatro da Graça, from 1986 to 1993. She subsequently worked at the Monumental, Politeama, Malaposta, Trindade and Almada theatres. From 1996 to 1998, she was a member of the D. Maria II National Theatre.
