= Atelier-Museu Júlio Pomar =

Biographical art museum in Lisbon

Coordinates: 38°42′41″N 9°09′02″W

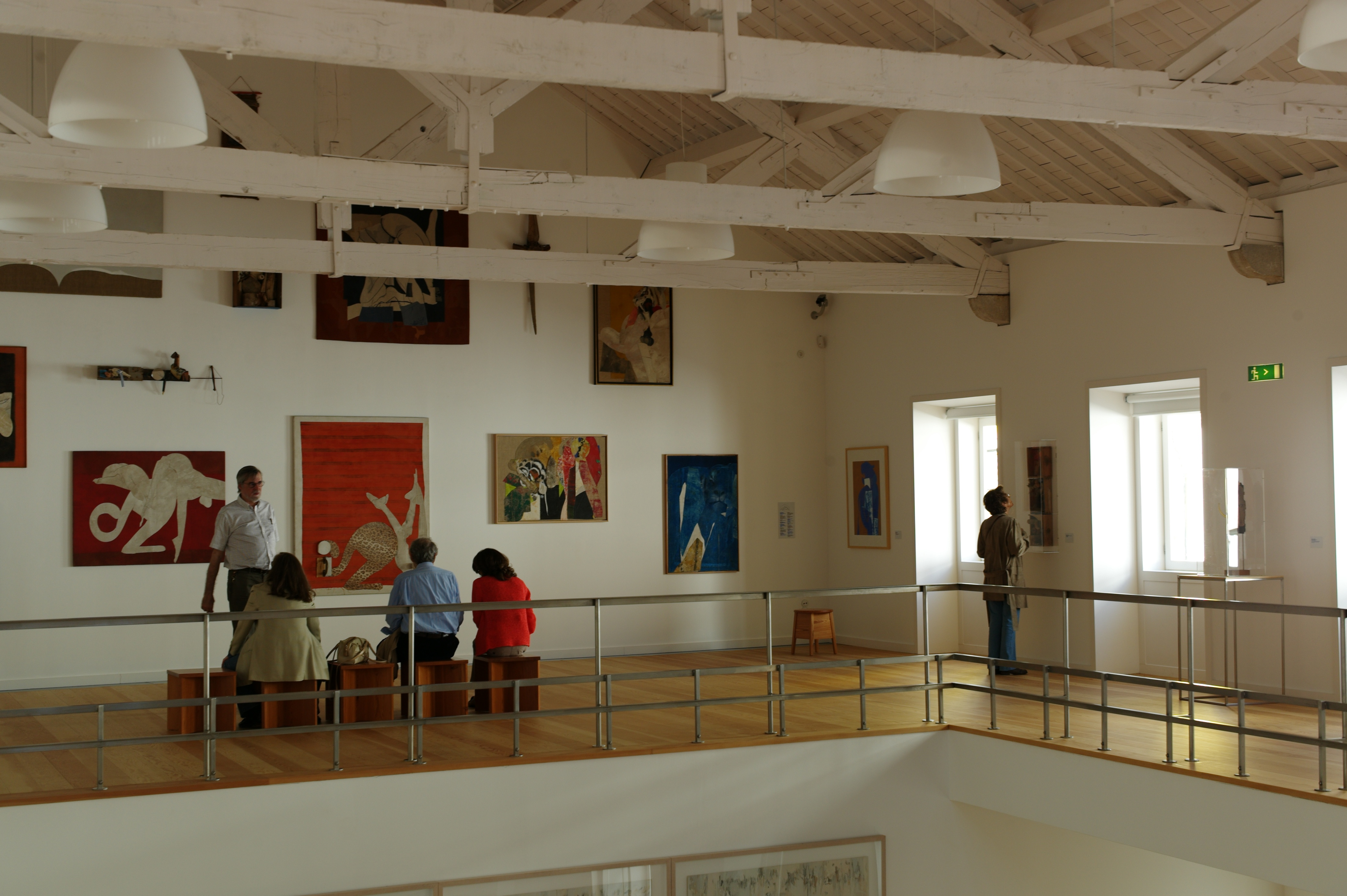
- Established: 2013
- Location: Lisbon, Portugal
- Type: Art museum
- Collection size: 1,500 +
- Director: Sara Antónia Matos
- Website: www.ateliermuseujuliopomar.pt/en/

The Atelier-Museum Júlio Pomar is a museum in Lisbon, Portugal, that preserves and promotes the work of Júlio Pomar (1926–2018) through temporary exhibitions, events, conferences, and educational activities. Located between Bairro Alto and Madragoa, two of the city's most popular neighborhoods, the museum building was designed by architect Álvaro Siza (Matosinhos, 1933), winner of the 1992 Pritzker Architecture Prize. The museum's holdings include approximately 1,500 works by Júlio Pomar and other artists who were close to him.

== History ==
The architectural project of the Atelier-Museu Júlio-Pomar was designed by architect Álvaro Siza Vieira (Matosinhos, 1933), Pritzker Prize winner in 1992.

Purchased in 2000 by the Lisbon City Council, this former warehouse on Rua do Vale was intended to be the studio of Júlio Pomar, who lived on the same street during the last years of his life. The renovation work extended over several years and, in 2010, the artist gave up using it as a studio, making it possible to open the space as a museum earlier than anticipated. Álvaro Siza Vieira's project and the name of the cultural space, Studio-Museum, preserve the memory of its founding purpose.

== Architecture ==
Integrated into the architectural fabric of one of Lisbon's neighborhoods, the Júlio Pomar Studio-Museum building, consisting of two floors, features a central exhibition area, two storage rooms, service areas, an office, and a reception, concealing an exterior courtyard around which visitor access is made.

The museum features a small patio that serves as a welcoming resting place in the neighborhood. Álvaro Siza describes the patio as a "welcoming area with benches and azulejo tiles by Júlio Pomar." He notes, "It is a sort of antechamber to the reception area and to what is revealed upon entering. Júlio Pomar wanted to place the tiles there, and I approved of it. In architectural composition, entrances are spaces that draw people in and are crucial to the itinerary and sequential experience of the spaces".

== Collection ==
The museum houses several hundred works (painting, drawing, collage, printmaking, sculpture, assemblage, etc.) on long-term loan from the Júlio Pomar Foundation collection. In total, the collection contains around 1,500 works by Júlio Pomar and other artists who were close to him.
