= Ana Jotta =

Portuguese artist

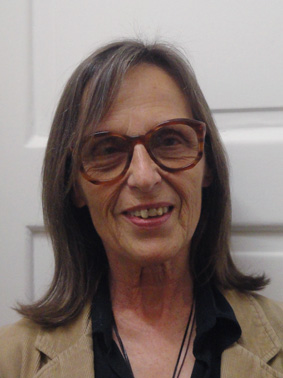
- Ana Jotta in 2013
- Born: 1946 (age 79–80); Lisbon, Portugal
- Education: Escola de Belas Artes de Lisboa (ESBAL), Lisbon; La Cambre, Brussels
- Known for: Visual art, installation
- Awards: Grande Prémio EDP/Arte 2013

Ana Jotta (born 1946) is a Portuguese artist.

== Early life ==
Ana Jotta was born in 1946 in Lisbon. She studied art at ESBAL – Escola de Belas Artes de Lisboa (Lisbon School of Fine Arts) and at La Cambre in Brussels. From 1976 to 1979 Jotta was an actress and a decorator for cinema and theatre. She became more focused on visual arts since the 1980s.

== Career ==
Jotta explores all artistic fields: painting, sculpture, installation, sound, photography. She also works with craft techniques like sewing, embroidery and pottery. Her projects are extremely varied, she invents new and unexpected forms for each of her exhibitions. In 2018, she co-curated with Ricardo Valentim "from A to C", an exhibition of works by Al Cartio and Constance Ruth Howes at Calouste Gulbenkian Museum, Lisbon.

Jotta has had two major career retrospectives: "Rua Ana Jotta" at Museu Serralves (Porto, 2005) and "A Conclusão da Precedente" at Culturgest (Lisbon, 2014).
