= Official portrait of President Mário Soares =

The official portrait of President Mário Soares is an oil painting by the artist Júlio Pomar, currently on display in the Official Portrait Gallery of the Museum of the Presidency of the Republic of Portugal. The portrait is dated 1992.

The composition clearly evokes the figure of Mário Soares, although it is not rendered in a naturalistic manner: the face, more faithfully depicted, reveals his characteristic "cheeks" and a lively gaze directed straight at the viewer; expressive and dynamic brushstrokes suggest a crumpled suit, with an open jacket and a loosened tie, while the arms gesture as if engaged in an energetic political debate. Soares is portrayed seated in the Chair of the Lions, the only element that evokes the power associated with the Presidency of the Republic. The background is rendered in bluish tones, with the exception of a pink area that appears to spread from the right hand, raised and moving through the air.

Soares and Júlio Pomar were long-time friends, dating back to 1947, when they were tried and shared a cell for four months at the Fort of Caxias for being leaders of the Juvenile Democratic Unity Movement.

The portrait represented a turning point in the gallery of official portraits; not since Columbano Bordalo Pinheiro—who portrayed Manuel de Arriaga, Teófilo Braga, and Manuel Teixeira Gomes—had a major artist, widely recognised by critics, entered this space. The fact that it is a highly unconventional composition, breaking with the more formal and austere representations of previous presidents, greatly pleased Mário Soares: “[It could not have turned out better … What matters is this portrait. There is no doubt that it is a sensational portrait, because it shows me as I am.]”
