= Casa Garden =

Building in Santo António, Macau

Coordinates: 22°12′01.1″N 113°32′23.6″E

- Traditional Chinese: 東方基金會會址
- Simplified Chinese: 东方基金会会址
Transcriptions
Standard Mandarin
- Hanyu Pinyin: Dōngfāng Jījīnhuì Huìzhǐ
Yue: Cantonese
- Jyutping: dung1 fong1 gei1 gam1 wui6*2 wui? zi2

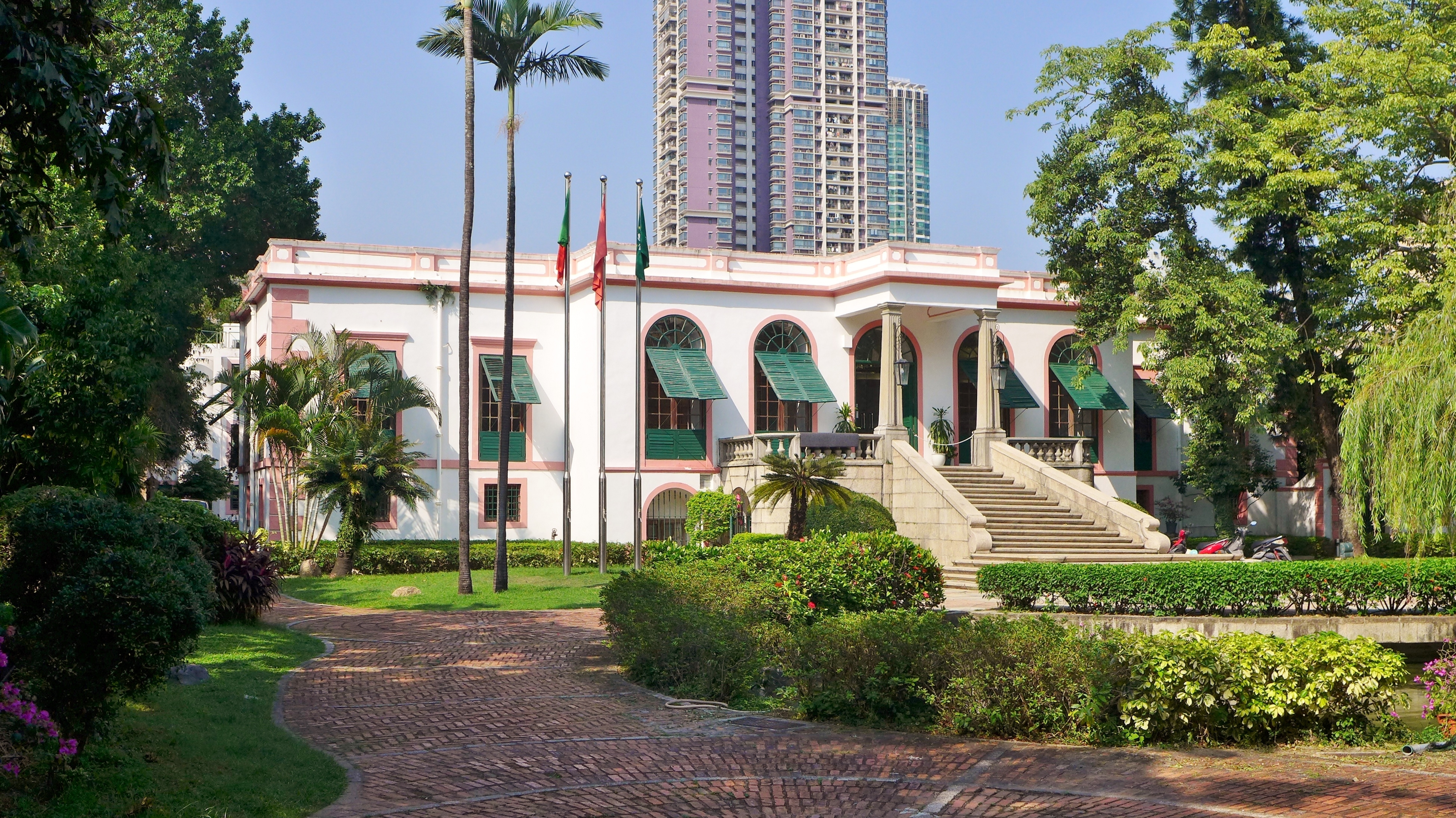
Casa Garden

Map

The Casa Garden (Chinese: 東方基金會會址) is a small parkette in Santo António, Macau. The area is the headquarters of the Macau delegation of the Orient Foundation.

== History ==
Built in 1770, the park was originally the residence of a wealthy Portuguese merchant, Manuel Pereira. At a later period, it was rented out to the English East India Company and was used to house the directors of the Macau branch of the company. In 2005, it was officially enlisted as part of the UNESCO World Heritage Site Historic Centre of Macau. Nowadays it is a cultural centre, which promotes a cross between Portuguese and Macau/Chinese art. In 2014 Sofia Areal had an exhibition in Casa Garden after a monthly residence in Macau. Coupled with an exhibition in Lisbon in 2015 in the Museum of the Orient.

== Architecture ==
The park contains the old residence, the Old Protestant Cemetery and an art gallery.

== See also ==
- List of tourist attractions in Macau
