= Vieira Portuense =

Portuguese painter

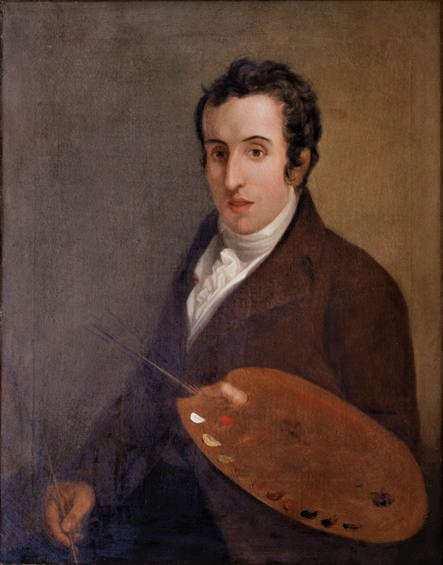
- Portrait of Vieira Portuense by José Teixeira Barreto
- Born: 13 May 1765; Porto, Kingdom of Portugal
- Died: 2 May 1805 (aged 39); Funchal, Madeira, Kingdom of Portugal
- Known for: Painting
- Movement: Rococo, Neoclassicism

Francisco Vieira (13 May 1765 – 2 May 1805), who chose the artistic name of Vieira Portuense, was a Portuguese painter, one of the introducers of Neoclassicism in Portuguese painting. He was, in the neoclassical style, one of the two great Portuguese painters of his generation, with Domingos Sequeira.

== Career ==
He first studied in Lisbon, later moving to Rome. He travelled through Italy, Germany, Austria and England, before returning to Portugal, in 1800. He met Swiss painter Angelica Kauffman, from whom he seems to have received influences. He seems to anticipate some motives of the romantic painting in several of his historical paintings, like Dona Filipa de Vilhena knighting her sons (1801).

He contracted tuberculosis, and moved to Madeira, where he died, aged only 39.

He is represented at the National Museum of Ancient Art, in Lisbon, and at the National Museum Soares dos Reis, in Porto.

Not to be confused with another Portuguese painter, Francisco Vieira de Matos, better known as Vieira Lusitano.

== Works ==
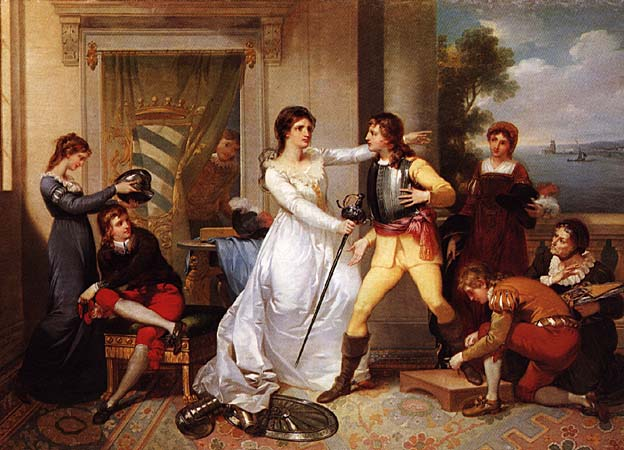
"D. Filipa de Vilhena arma os filhos cavaleiros em 1 de dezembro de 1640" (colecção particular)

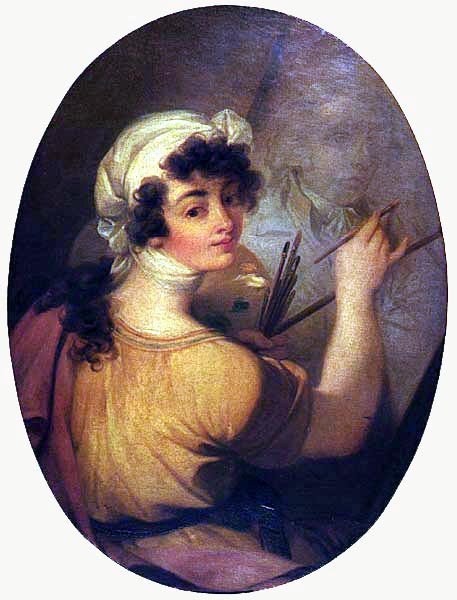
"Alegoria à Pintura" Queluz National Palace

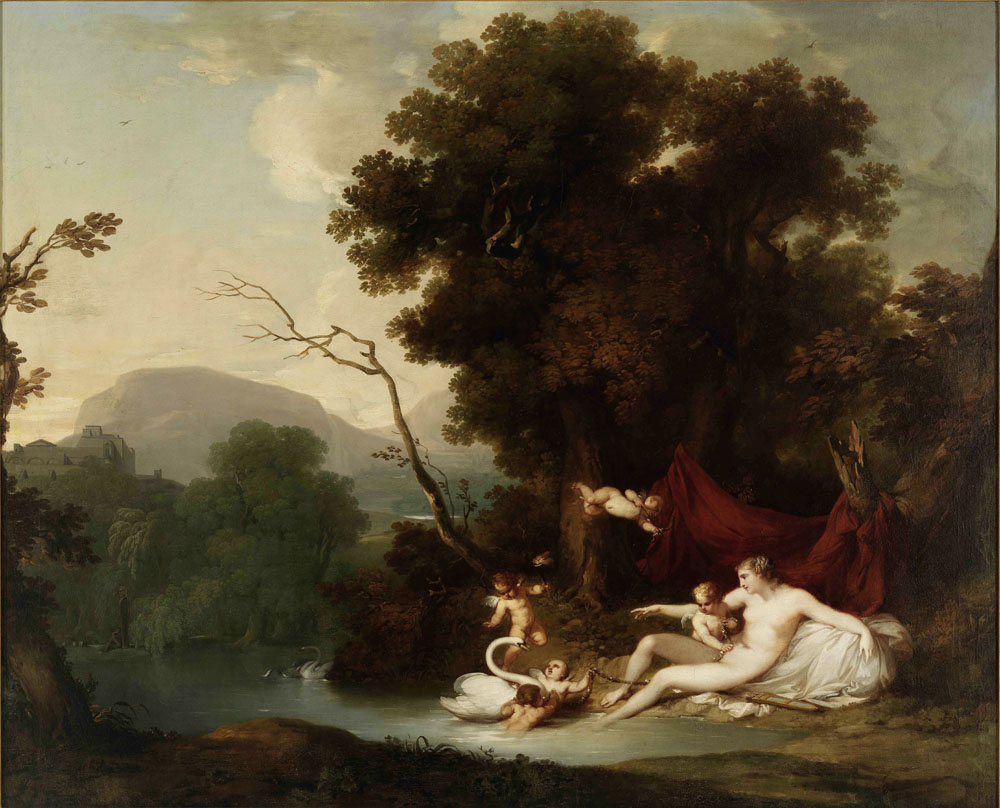
"Leda e o Cisne" Museu Nacional de Arte Antiga

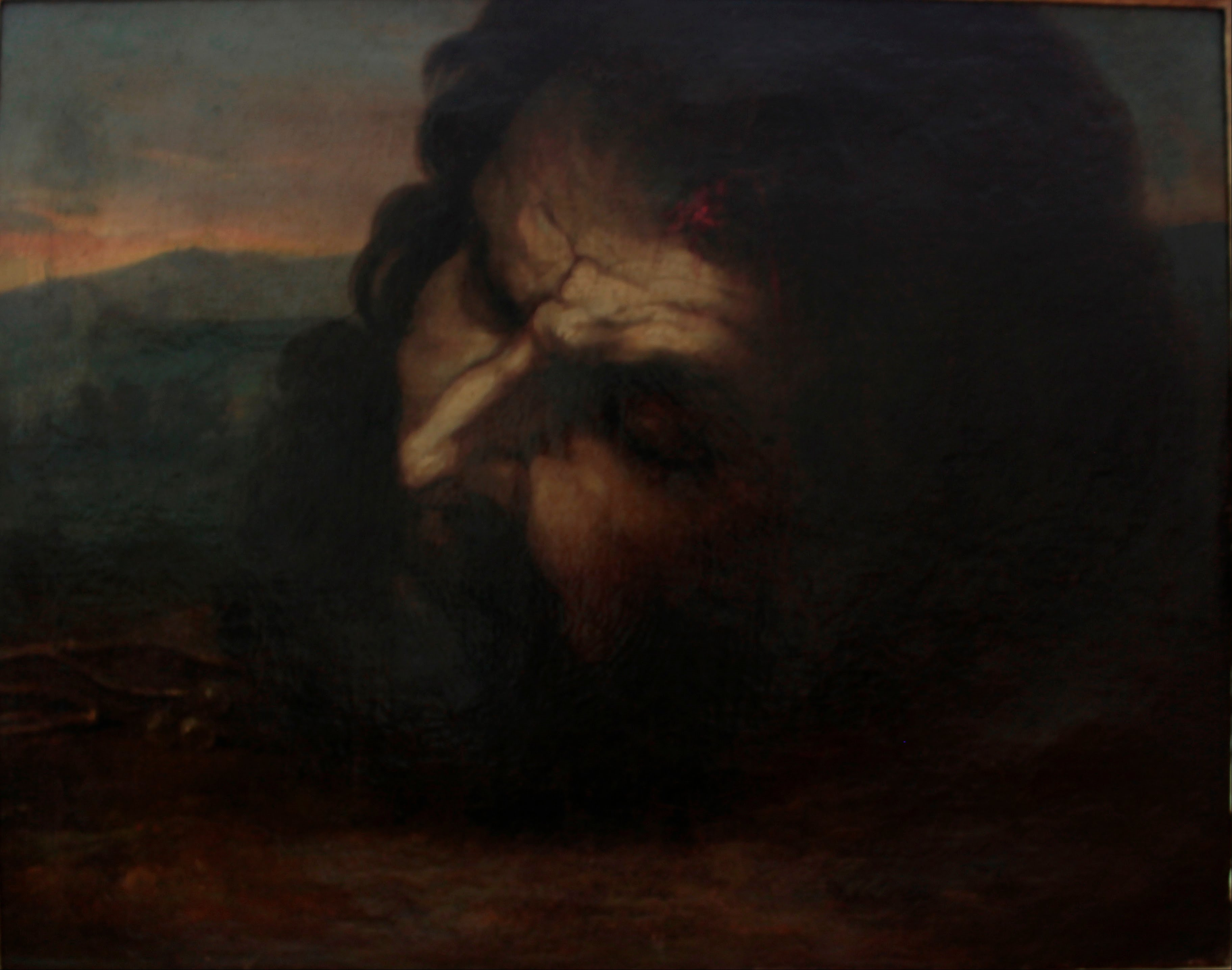
"Cabeça de Golias" Fundação Dionísio Pinheiro e Alice Cardoso Pinheiro

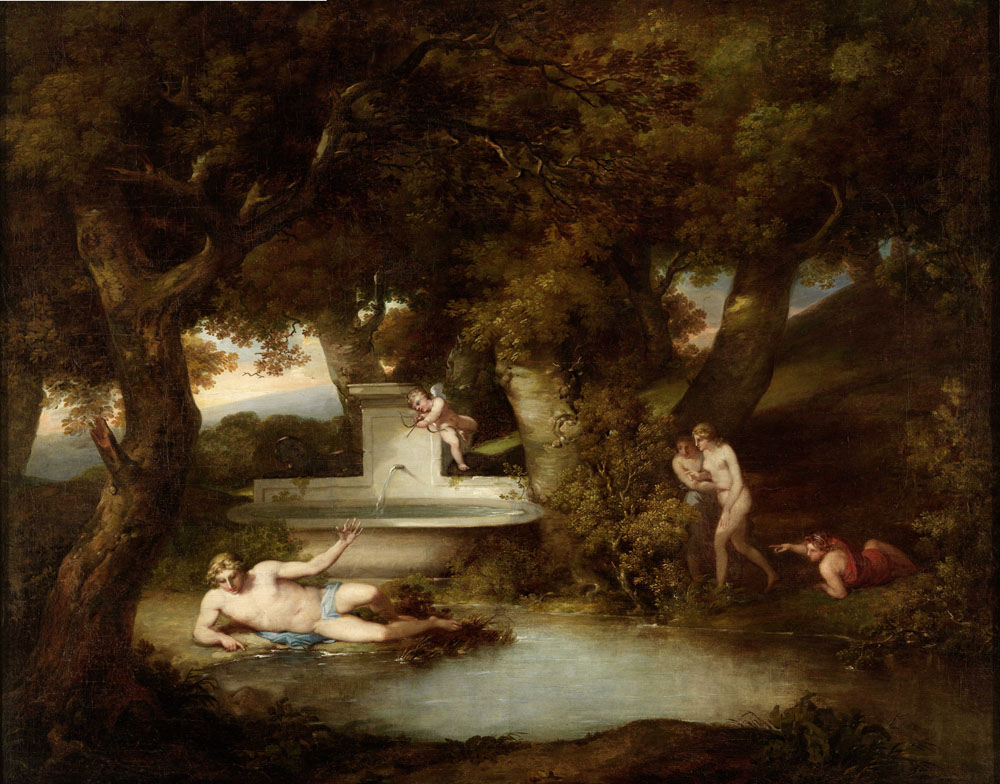
"Narciso na Fonte" Correio-Mor Palace
