= José Pedro Croft =

Visual artist

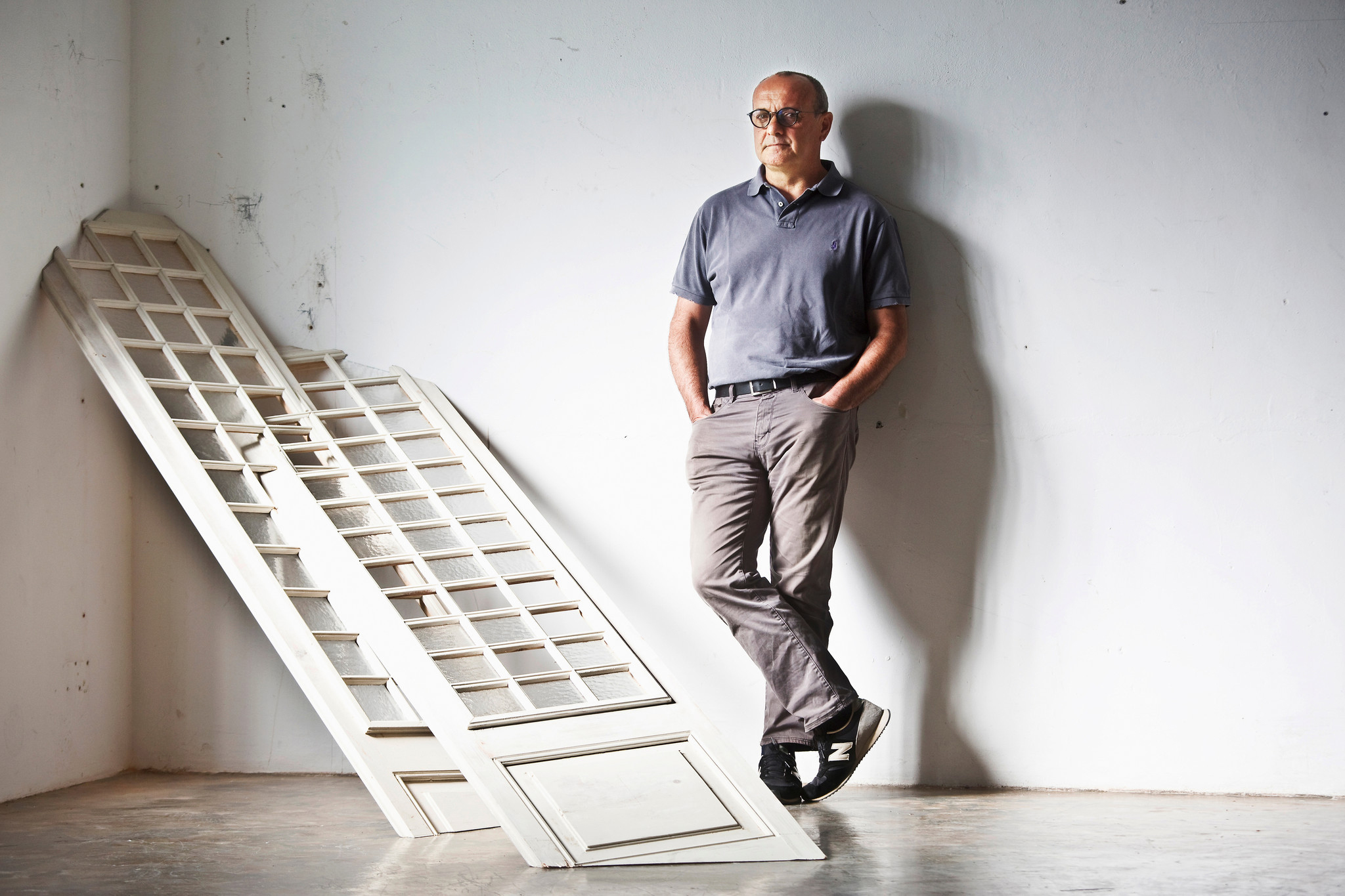
- Born: 1957 (64 years old) Porto, Portugal
- Education: Escola Superior de Belas-Artes de Lisboa

José Pedro Croft (born 1957 in Porto) is a visual artist. Considered as one of the main representatives of the revival of Portuguese sculpture, he is widely known for his geometric sculptures and paintings.

José Pedro Croft was born in Porto in 1957. He studied painting at the Escola Superior de Belas Artes in Lisbon, where he has lived since his teenage years.

== Collections ==
Today, his work is present in the collections of various international museums and institutions such as the Centre Pompidou in Paris, the Museo Nacional Centro de Arte Reina Sofía in Madrid, the Fondation Calouste Gulbenkian in Lisbon or the Museu de Arte Moderna in Rio de Janeiro

== Monographs ==
- Ed. João Pinharanda, José Pedro Croft/ Medida Incerta, 2017 (Hatje Cantz Editions), ISBN 978-3-7757-4288-7
- Ed. Instituto Açoriano de Cultura, José Pedro Croft. gravura, 2009 (Tristan Barbara Editions).
- Ed. Isabel C Rodrigues, José Pedro Croft Esculture. Desenho. Gravura. Fotografia, 2011 (Bial Editions), ISBN 978-989-8483-01-0
- José Pedro Croft Objectos Imediatos, 2014 (Documenta Editions), ISBN 978-989-8566-68-3
- Helena de Gubernatis, José Pedro Croft 1979-2002, 2002 (Fundação Centro Cultural de Belém Editions), ISBN 972-8176-75-9
- Ed. Delfim Sardo, Una coisa José Pedro Croft, 2019 (Galeria municipal dde Matosinhos Editions), ISBN 978-972-9143-83-0
