= Alice Jorge =

Portuguese neorealist and abstract painter and engraver (1924–2008)

- Born: Maria Alice da Silva Jorge; 1924; Lisbon, Portugal
- Died: 16–17 February 2008; Lisbon
- Occupations: Painter and engraver
- Known for: Promotion of engraving in Portugal

Maria Alice da Silva Jorge (1924 — 2008) was a Portuguese painter, engraver, ceramicist, and book illustrator and co-author of a book on engraving for students. Initially following a neorealist style, her work later became more abstract. One of the most important personalities in the Portuguese engraving renewal movement of the 1950s, she was banned from teaching art for 19 years because of her support for the families of political prisoners.

== Early life ==
Jorge was born in 1924 in the Portuguese capital of Lisbon. She attended the António Arroio School of Applied Arts and, later, the Escola Superior de Belas-Artes de Lisboa (1946-1954). To complete her studies in architectural drawing she attended the Escola de Belas-Artes do Porto (Porto School of Fine Arts) in 1948. She studied pedagogy at the Faculty of Arts of the University of Lisbon in 1952 and 1953, and was a technical education teacher between 1951 and 1955. Between 1954 and 1961 she was married to the artist Júlio Pomar.

== Career ==
Jorge began exhibiting her works in the 1950s at the Exposições Gerais de Artes Plásticas (General Exhibition of Plastic Arts – EGAP). In addition to engraving, painting, and drawing, she worked in ceramics, tiles, glass and tapestry. She was also a book illustrator, collaborating on works by authors such as Aquilino Ribeiro, David Mourão-Ferreira and Matilde Rosa Lopes de Araújo. She illustrated Portuguese editions of The Decameron, the Divine Comedy, Miguel de Cervantes' Exemplary Novels, and One Thousand and One Nights. She was also responsible for the illustrations in the anthologies of Portuguese poets organized by José Régio in the early 1960s.

In the 1950s her engravings often recorded scenes of everyday life, people at work and the role of women, being referred to as "the woman who showed us women". Her attempt to give dignity to the lives of the working classes is most evident in this period. In 1955, by order of the dictatorial Estado Novo government, she was dismissed from the school in which she was teaching printmaking, painting and drawing and was not allowed to be employed by the government until after the Carnation Revolution in 1974. Her "offence" was to help families of political prisoners. 1955 also marked the time she started to engrave nudes.

In 1956 Jorge joined an atelier in Praça da Alegria, Lisbon with the sculptors Vasco Pereira da Conceição and Maria Barreira, together with Pomar. In the same year, she was one of the founders of Gravura – Sociedade Cooperativa de Gravadores Portugueses (Cooperative Society of Portuguese Engravers) and was a member of its board of directors from 1956 to 1968. In the second half of the 1960s her work became more abstract, and she was increasingly concentrating on oil and watercolour painting. She received a scholarship from the Calouste Gulbenkian Foundation for a visit to Paris from 1968 to 1970, and another from 1976 to 1978 in Portugal, to create an album on engraving techniques. Alongside her artistic activity, she ran engraving courses and, in the 1980s, published, with Maria Gabriel, the book Técnicas da Gravura Artística. She was a member of the Technical Council of the National Society of Fine Arts (1980-1984).

Jorge's work is to be found in the National Museum of Contemporary Art and in the Calouste Gulbenkian Museum in Lisbon and at the Centre Culturel Portugais / Fondation Calouste Gulbenkian in Paris, among others.

== Awards and honours ==
In June 1993, Jorge was awarded the rank of Officer of the Order of St. James of the Sword for artistic merit.

== Death ==
Jorge died on the weekend of February 16 and 17, 2008 in Lisbon. She was buried at the Alto de São João Cemetery in Lisbon.

== Solo exhibitions ==
The following is a list of Jorge's solo exhibitions.

- 1960 – Painting and engraving. Cooperativa Gravura, Lisbon.
- 1963 – Painting. Diário de Notícias Gallery, Lisbon.
- 1968 – Engraving. Cooperativa Gravura, Lisbon.
- 1971 – Engraving, drawing, painting. São Francisco Gallery, Lisbon.
- 1972 – Painting. Calouste Gulbenkian Foundation, Lisbon.
- 1977 – Painting and watercolours. Costa do Sol Tourism Board.
- 1978 – Painting and drawing. Sociedade Nacional de Belas Artes, Lisbon.
- 1980 – Painting and watercolours. Galeria Tempo, Lisbon.
- 1980 – Painting and watercolours. Alvarez Gallery, Porto.
- 1982 – Painting, watercolours and drawing. Ana Isabel Gallery, Lisbon.
- 1985 – Painting. Diário de Notícias Gallery, Lisbon.
- 1986 – Watercolours and drawing. Bertrand Gallery, Lisbon and Porto.
- 1991 – Painting and watercolours. Teatro Romano Gallery, Lisbon.
- 1991 – Painting and watercolours. Romantic House-Museum, Porto.
- 2013 – Retrospective of neorealist period. Museum of Neo-Realism, Vila Franca de Xira.
