= Nogueira da Silva Museum =

Coordinates: 41.551911°N 8.421791°W

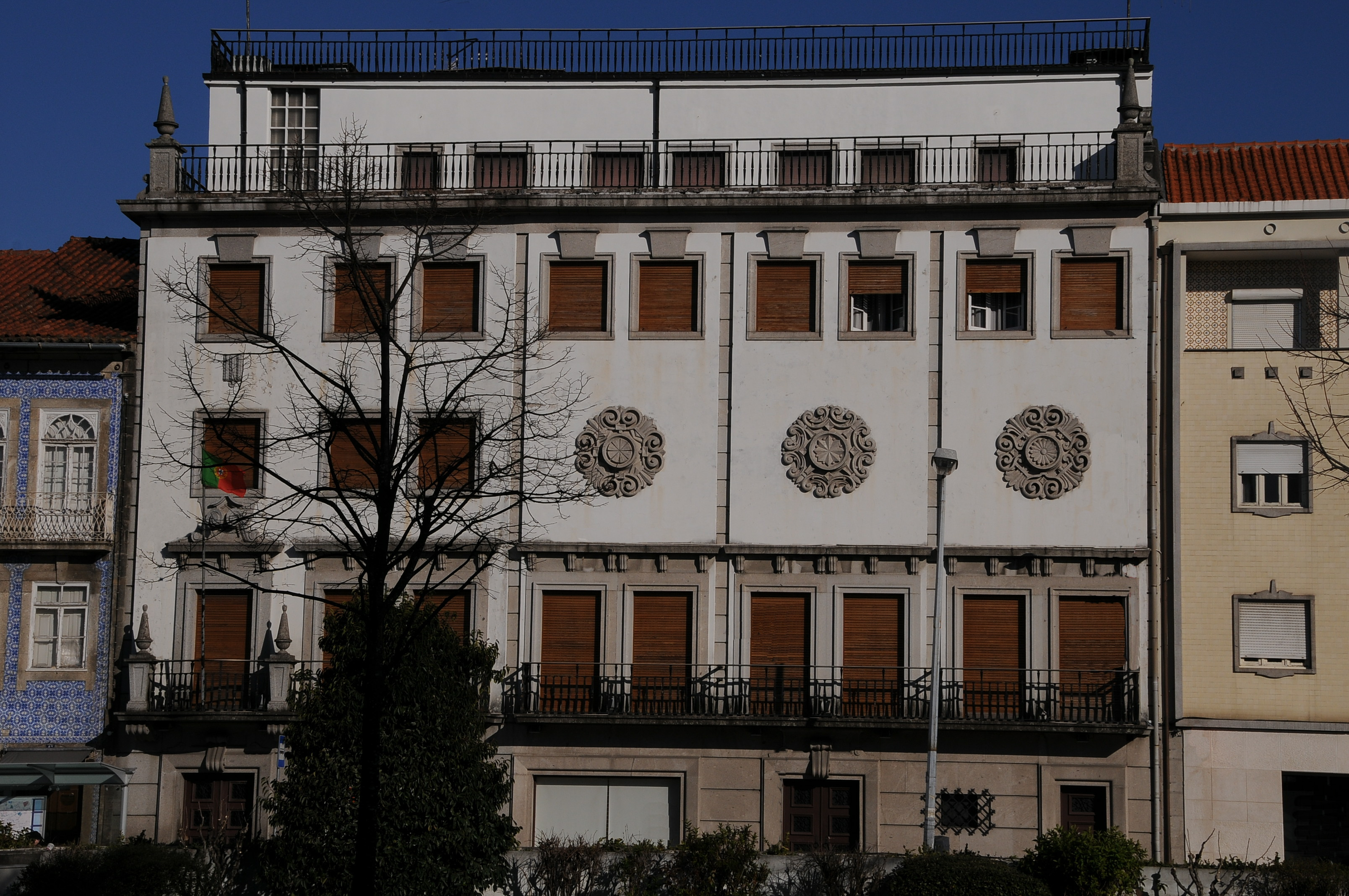
- Established: 1975
- Location: Braga, Portugal
- Type: House museum

The Nogueira da Silva Museum is located in Braga, Portugal.

The museum consists of the legacy bequeathed by the entrepreneur Nogueira da Silva to the University of Minho. In his philanthropic activity and enthusiasm for antiques and works of art, he accumulated an invaluable collection which included many rare pieces of furniture, paintings, and sculptures from various periods and styles. The museum comprises significant Renaissance pieces, Portuguese painting, 17th furniture, ceramics and creations in ivory, silver and religious art.

In addition to the art collection, the legacy included the magnificent building, in the centre of Braga with beautiful gardens of French inspiration.
