= Manuel Vilarinho (painter) =

Portuguese painter (born 1953)

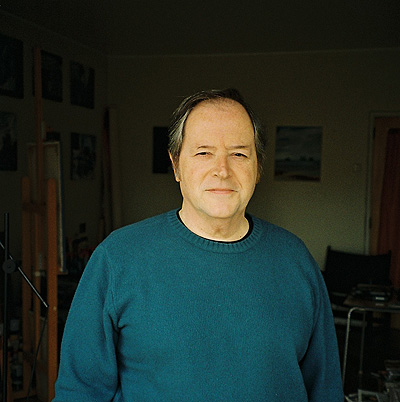
Manuel Vilarinho, Painter

Manuel Vilarinho (born 1953, Lisbon) is a Portuguese painter who lives and works in Lisbon. Vilarinho has a degree in painting from the Escola Superior de Belas Artes de Lisboa. He works in the fields of painting and drawing. "...the guiding principle that organizes Manuel Vilarinho's landscapes is the walk, the slow enjoyment of the visible though completed by the fleetingness of someone who drives on the road, taking in, in and extremely quick way, such visual information as stands out from the bulk of natural landscape." He began taking part in exhibitions in the 1980s, and, in 1985, had his first solo exhibition. He has exhibited his work individually in various galleries and museums. Since 1981, he has taken part in numerous national and international group exhibitions.

MANUEL VILARINHO - Pintura e desenho 2001/2006 “(...) A journey should, for example, drive you through every stopover imaginable; there is always something you haven’t seen yet, some unknown place, one thing or another, or maybe some new event: nearby landscapes; ruins; outskirts... Manuel Vilarinho captures the environment cognitively and organizes it in his canvas using either geometrical or figurative shapes: landscapes - hills, with green colors, earthy browns, the red earth - where the local pathways where travelers wander open themselves; views that agglutinate, that juxtapose themselves, in their multiple plans as the sum of environments, of natural objects and, of the urban world as well, the ruins, the signs, the letters signaling paths, the chimneys, the walls with bare bricks, the constructed fences, a maze that forms the pathway, several undefined shapes, the rough brushstroke, an expressive stroke, and colors and shapes meet in this cluster of feelings, views of the landscape, cuttings recorded on painted canvas.”

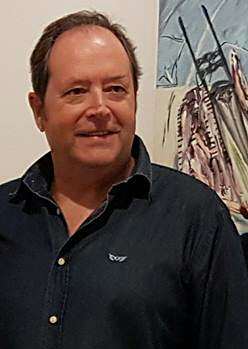
Manuel Vilarinho at his solo exhibition, at Casa-Museu Medeiros e Almeida, in Lisbon.

Individual Exhibitions (selection):
Casa Bocage, Setúbal (1985,1997) / Leo Gallery, Lisbon (1988,1989,1991) / Gomes Alves Gallery, Guimarães (1993, 2000) / Módulo, Oporto (1995,1997) / Módulo, Lisbon (1996) / Amadeo de Souza-Cardoso Museum, Amarante (2003) / Alberto Sampaio Museum, Guimarães (2004) / Jorge Vieira Museum - Galeria dos Escudeiros, Beja (2005) / Casa da Cerca - Contemporary Art Center, Almada (2006) / Giefarte, Lisbon (2007, 2014) / Monumental Gallery, Lisbon (2010), Convent of Christ, Tomar (2011,2012) / World Legend, Lisbon (2013) / Sintra Municipal Gallery and Casa Mantero - Sintra Municipal Library (2013) / Casa da Baía, Setúbal (2016) / Casa-Museu Medeiros e Almeida, Lisbon (2017).

Collective Exhibitions (selection):
Multiarte Gallery, São Caetano, S.P., Brazil (1987) / "IV Prémio Aquarela Brasileira de Artes Plásticas", São Paulo, Brazil, 1989 (bronze medal ex-aequo in mixed media section) / "Desenhos Contemporâneos a partir do Infra-mince", Lisbon 94 - European Capital of Culture, Rafael Bordalo Pinheiro Museum, Lisbon (1994) / "O Rosto da Máscara", Centro Cultural de Belém, Lisbon (1994) / "Encontro-Artistas Portugueses Contemporâneos no Oriente", Sakai Museum, Japan (1996), Shoto Museum of Art, Tokyo, Japan (1997), Sejong Cultural Center Gallery, Seul, South Korea (1997) and Forum's Gallery, Macao (1997) / "A Arte do Crítico: Obras da Colecção de António Rodrigues", Electricity Museum, Lisbon (2010) / "Teleférico Dinâmico", Guimarães 2012 - European Capital of Culture / "Caminhos", Casa da Cerca - Contemporary Art Center, Almada (2015).
