= Manuel Casimiro =

Portuguese artist

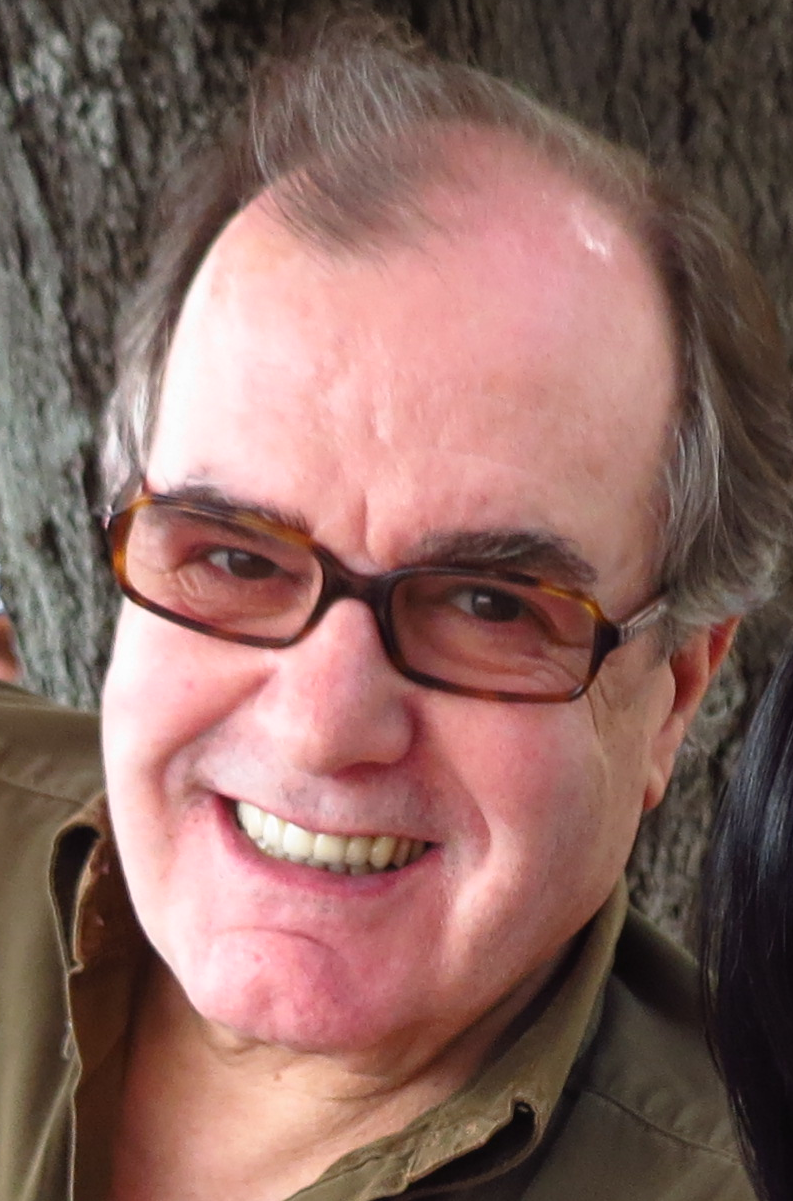
- Casimiro in 2012
- Born: Manuel Casimiro de Oliveira; November 21, 1941 (age 84); Porto, Portugal
- Website: http://www.manuelcasimiro.com/

Manuel Casimiro (born November 21, 1941) is a Portuguese painter, sculptor, designer and film director. He was born in Porto, Portugal, where he is currently living. Manuel Casimiro has spent a large part of his life living abroad, especially in Nice, France where he went to live after he was wounded in Portuguese Angola during the Portuguese Colonial War.

Manuel Casimiro is the son of the late film director Manoel de Oliveira.

== Life ==
Manuel Casimiro was born in a quite affluent family but only decided to devote himself entirely to his artistic pursuit after the Angolan war where he fought and was wounded. When he left Portugal to live abroad, mainly in Nice, France, he did not rely on family resources and lived in semi-poverty for many years. The generous friendships that he forged during that period helped him through his hardship and were to last for his whole life, particularly with people such as Vincent Descombes, Jean-François Lyotard, Michel Butor. The articles they published on Manuel Casimiro’s work account for their appreciation of the man and the artist. In 1978 he lived for one year in New York where his first major collective exhibition took place. He managed to sell a few painting which enabled him to travel Northern European countries and Italy where he spent some time, especially in Venice. There he met and photographed Peggy Guggenheim in her foundations, only shortly before she died in 1979. This meeting was to have a lasting influence on Manuel Casimiro and the photography was to become the subject matter for an intervention.

== Selected exhibitions ==
Manuel Casimiro has presented many individual and collective exhibitions and here are listed some of the major ones.

- 1978: The Cooper-Hewitt Museum, New York, exhibited a collection of works by Robert Motherwell, Douanne Michaelis, David Hockney and Manuel Casimiro and many others. This collective exhibition was then displayed in New York, Tokyo, London, Paris and Berlin. Oedipus Explaining the Enigma, an intervention work by Manuel Casimiro, was exhibited.
- 1980: Manuel Casimiro represented France in various international events, as in 1980 at the D.A.A.D in Berlin, Germany for the exhibition Nice in Berlin, or in 1981 in São Paulo, Brazil at the Museum of Modern Art of the São Paulo University.

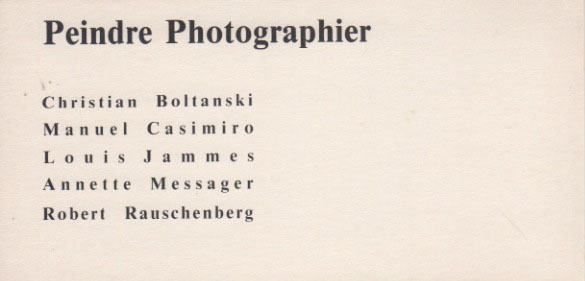
Invitation card for the Peindre, Photographier exhibition in Nice, 1986.

- 1986: In Nice, France Casimiro contributed to the exhibition Peindre, Photographier along with Christian Boltanski, Louis James, Annette Messager, Robert Rauschenberg. On this particular occasion, Manuel Casimiro chose to make two interventions on two Orientalist paintings in the Jules Chéret Museum by painting ovoids with erasable paint.
- 1988: The National Museum Soares dos Reis in Oporto exhibited a collection of works about the Portuguese myths The Ghosts of King Sebastian. This exhibition was also displayed in Bari, Italy in 2006.
- 1996/1997: The Museum of Contemporary Art of Serralves in Porto under the lead of Jean-Hubert Martin, organized a retrospective of Manuel Casimiro’s work entitled Manuel Casimiro 1964-1996. The Museu Serralves edited a 145-page catalog with texts by important personalities interested in the arts, such as Michel Butor, Jean-François Lyotard, Jean-Hubert Martin, Christine Buci-Glucksmann, Giulio Giorello, Raphael Monticello, José Augusto França, Eduardo Lourenço, António Cerveira Pinto, Bernardo Pinto de Almeida, Agustina Bessa Luís and others. As reported by Museu Serralves this institution has several works of Manuel Casimiro in its collection.
- 2002: As part of the opening of Salamanca Capital of Culture 2002, two exhibitions were organized: Bridges and The Imaginary Museum.
- 2003: In an exhibition called Playing with Scales, the Galician Center of Contemporary Art exhibited photographs by Manuel Casimiro which dated back to 1972 and which were part of a work called City. These photographs were displayed opposite more recent works by other artists and showed their very topicality some 30 years later.
- 2004: On the occasion of an exhibition called Chocolate Manuel Casimiro published a collection of texts entitled Neither Antique, Nor Modern. In one of the articles Manuel Casimiro strongly criticizes the development of the financial system that the art market has become.
- 2009: The Belém Cultural Center in Lisbon exhibited Caprichos, a series of interventions by Manuel Casimiro on Goya’s work. Michel Butor contributed to the exhibition with a few texts on Goya and Manuel Casimiro’s works. They were published along others texts by Manuel Casimiro to illustrate the objectives of these interventions and to try to decipher the hallmark of his creative work, the ovoid.
- 2017: In 2017 the curators of The New Art Fest selected a work of Casimiro for the 2017 edition of the Lisbon-based new media festival.

== The Ovoid ==
When considering Manuel Casimiro’s work it is necessary to bear in mind that he gives a paramount importance to the idea within the work of art, the “cosa mentale” in Leonardo da Vinci’s words. The ovoid, and its use in interventions and other works, provides a focal point around which the work of art is re-evaluated and reconsidered. The artists himself seldom talks about the ovoid leaving it to the spectator to supply meaning within that void form.

== Bibliography ==
- Caprichos, Michel Butor (2008) ISBN 978-972-8955-87-8
- Manuel Casimiro, Fátima Lambert (2006) ISBN 972-21-1712-2
- Nem antigo nem moderno, Manuel Casimiro (2005) Dep. Legal 229419/05
- Pontes. Manuel Casimiro (2001) ISBN 972-8451-21-0
- Manuel Casimiro (1998) ISBN 972-9402-55-8
- O Jardim Pintado. Três Montanhas e Cinco Montes (1996)
- Manuel Casimiro, José Augusto França (1996)
- Manuel Casimiro. Retrospectiva 1964-1996 Museum of Contemporary Art of Serralves, Oporto (1996)
- Miscellaneous Texts I & II: Aesthetics and Theory of Art & Contemporary Artists, Jean-François Lyotard, Leuven University Press, (2012). ISBN 9789058678867
