= António Dacosta =

Portuguese painter

António Dacosta (3 November 1914 - 2 December 1990) was a Portuguese painter, poet and art critic and a pioneer of the surrealist movement in Portugal.

== Early life ==
Dacosta was born in Angra do Heroísmo and grew up on Terceira island, in the Azores. Although he had no formal art training, Dacosta drew and painted from an early age. He completed his studies at the Angra High School and in 1935 left Terceira to attend the Escola de Belas Artes (Lisbon School of Fine Arts). Strongly opposed to the Salazar dictatorship in Portugal and horrified by the violence of the Spanish Civil War and the subsequent Nationalist victory, his painting took a menacing and surrealistic turn. He displayed his first paintings at Casa Repe in 1940 along with fellow painter António Pedro and English sculptor, Pamela Boden. He also showed at the annual national Salon of Modern Art where he won the Amadeo de Souza-Cardoso Prize in 1942.

He became one of the forerunners of the surrealistic movement in Portugal. Many of his surrealist paintings were lost in a fire in 1944 in the studio where he was working. The remaining paintings are owned by private collectors or Portuguese museums .

Throughout the 1940s he wrote art criticism for Portuguese newspapers and illustrated books for several contemporary Portuguese authors.

== Paris ==
In 1947, the French government awarded him a grant to spend a year in Paris, where he stayed for the rest of his life. For the first time, he was in direct contact with original masterpieces as well as the works of contemporary international artists. Post-war creativity was a revelation to him and he began to doubt the importance of his own work. He progressively stopped painting but nonetheless in 1948 sent two paintings to the Surrealist Group Show in Lisbon. In 1952, his first successful one-man show (17 Paintings 1940 – 1950) was held at the Galeria de Março in Lisbon. By 1953, he was no longer painting. He became a reporter for a Brazilian newspaper O Estado, writing about the Paris art scene (theatre, literature and art exhibitions). These articles (as well as articles written for Portuguese magazines) were later published in book-form « Dacosta em Paris » by Assirio & Alvim (1999).

Dacosta is today considered a pioneer of Portuguese surrealist art. In the 1950s, many Portuguese artists, including René Bertholo, travelled to Paris in search of new ideas and Dacosta became a valuable inspiration for them and a source of information about Parisian artistic life.

== Return to painting ==
In 1969 Dacosta attended a retrospective of his works from 1939 to 1948 at the Galeria Buchholz in Lisbon and in 1978 his paintings were included in Portuguese Art since 1910 at the Royal Academy of London, a show that he visited with his friend and fellow-artist, Júlio Pomar.

Rediscovering his earlier works at this show (he owned none of them) perhaps gave him an impetus to return to painting. In 1971 he moved with his wife, Miriam Rewald, the gallerist, and two young children to Janville, a small town south of Paris, where he started making little objects, ‘things,’ as he liked to call them. Encouraged by artist friends, including the Surrealist, Manuel Alves, he timidly acquired painting material. Although he never tried to show his work publicly, word got around as he occasionally showed a new drawing or object to visitors. In the mid-1970s he stopped sending his articles to Brazil and, thanks to a grant from the Calouste Gulbenkian Foundation, became free to paint. His surrealism disappeared and gave way to a completely new style, devoid of the uneasiness and aura of danger in his earlier works. He also began to utilise pagan-religious images from his childhood in the Azores. A peaceful and mystical element entered his paintings, a very personal style - figurative but not representative.

In 1983 a one-man show at Galeria 111 in Lisbon revealed his recent paintings, which were all sold to private and public collections. This success encouraged Dacosta to create more work. He was awarded the national art prize by the Portuguese art critics’ association in 1984 and honoured with the Grand Cross of the Order of Merit by Portuguese President, Mário Soares, in 1988.

Some of his paintings (Pieta, Molière's Window and others) are housed by the Museu de arte contemporanea Serralves.

== Commissions and exhibitions ==
- 1953: Galeria de Março, Lisbon (catalogue text by Fernando Lemos)
- 1968: Foundation Calouste Gulbenkian, Paris.
- 1969: Retrospective 1939–1948, Galeria Buchholz, Lisbon (catalogue text by Rui Mário Gonçalves).
- 1978: Portuguese Art since 1910, Royal Academy, London.
- 1983: Galeria 111, Lisbon (catalogue text by Rui Mário Gonçalves)
- 1984: Galeria Zen, Porto (catalogue text by Rui Mário Goncalves)
- 1985: Portuguese pavilion, Biennale of 1985, São Paulo, Brazil.
- 1988: Foundation Calouste Gulbenkian, Paris.
- 1988: Centro de Arte Moderna, Lisbon and Casa de Serralves Museum, Porto (catalogue texts by Fernando de Azevedo, Maria Helena de Freitas, Rui Mário Gonçalves, Júlio Pomar and José Sommer Ribeiro).
- 1995: Sala Nobre da Secretaria Regional da Educação e Cultura Angra do Heroísmo, Azores (catalogue text by Ruth Rosengarten).
- 1997: António Dacosta : peintre et poète portugais, Maison de la Poésie, Paris.
- 1997: António Dacosta : Peintures Intimes, Foundation Calouste Gulbenkian, Paris.
- 1999: Bermuda National Gallery and New Bedford Museum of Art (catalogue text by Ruth Rosengarten)
- 2006: Casa de Serralves Museum, Porto.
- 2007: António Dacosta : Scène Ouverte, Foundation Calouste Gulbenkian, Paris (catalogue texts by João Pedro Garcia, José-Luis Porfírio and Alain Tapié).

== Final years ==
He was commissioned to decorate a wall in the new building of the Azorean Parliament in Horta. He spent several months in Horta, installing a series of fifty-four heads in bas-relief representing Azorean citizens.

A monument designed by Dacosta was built and inaugurated in the Azores at the Sala Nobre da Secretaria Regional da Educação e Cultura Angra do Heroísmo in 1995.

He began a series of drawings to decorate the walls of Cais do Sodré, a new subway station in Lisbon. However, due to increasing bad health, painting became difficult and the commission was completed under the auspices of his friend and fellow artist Pedro Morais and inaugurated in 1998.

Dacosta dedicated much of his later years to poetry. His poems were published posthumously in 1994 as A Cal dos Muros (Chalk on the Wall) by Assirio & Assim (Lisbon).

He died on 2 December 1990 in Paris.

== Centenary ==
2014 was the centenary of his birth and the Calouste Gulbenkian Foundation organized a retrospective, curated by José-Luís Porfírio, former director His paintings are included in public and private collections of art in Europe and the United Statesof the Museum of Ancient Art, Lisbon. A catalogue raisonné was prepared by Fernando Rosas Dias, of the School of Fine Arts, Lisbon, and was published in 2012 with reproductions of his entire oeuvre.

== Bibliography ==
- António Dacosta, António Dacosta, Lisbon: Quetzal Editores/Galeria 111, 2000
- A.A.V.V., António Dacosta, Lisbon: Modern Art Centre, Fondation Calouste Gulbenkian / Serralves Foundation,1988.
- José Augusto França, A Arte em Portugal no Século XX: 1911-1961, Lisbon: Bertrand Editora, 1991
- Rui Mário Gonçalves, António Dacosta, Lisbon: Imprensa Nacional Casa da Moeda, 1984
- Remo Guidieri, Alexandre Melo and Antonio Tabucchi, António Dacosta, Lisbon: Quetzal Editores and Galeria 111, 1995
- Bernardo Pinto de Almeida, António Dacosta, Porto: Caminho, 2006 ISBN 972-21-1786-6
- Tania Saraiva, António Dacosta, Lisbon: Quidnovi, 2010
