= António Areal =

António Santiago Gonçalves Areal e Silva (1934, Porto – 1978, Lisbon) was a Portuguese visual artist and painter.

With a short life and work production, António Areal distinguishes himself in the Portuguese art scene of the second half of the twentieth century as a leading figure in the transition from Surrealism to Action painting. After with a strong connection with Pop Art and Nouveau réalisme. He is the father of four daughters, one of them is the painter Sofia Areal. He is also the grandfather of the artist Martim Brion.
