= Lisbon School of Fine Arts =

Former art school in Portugal

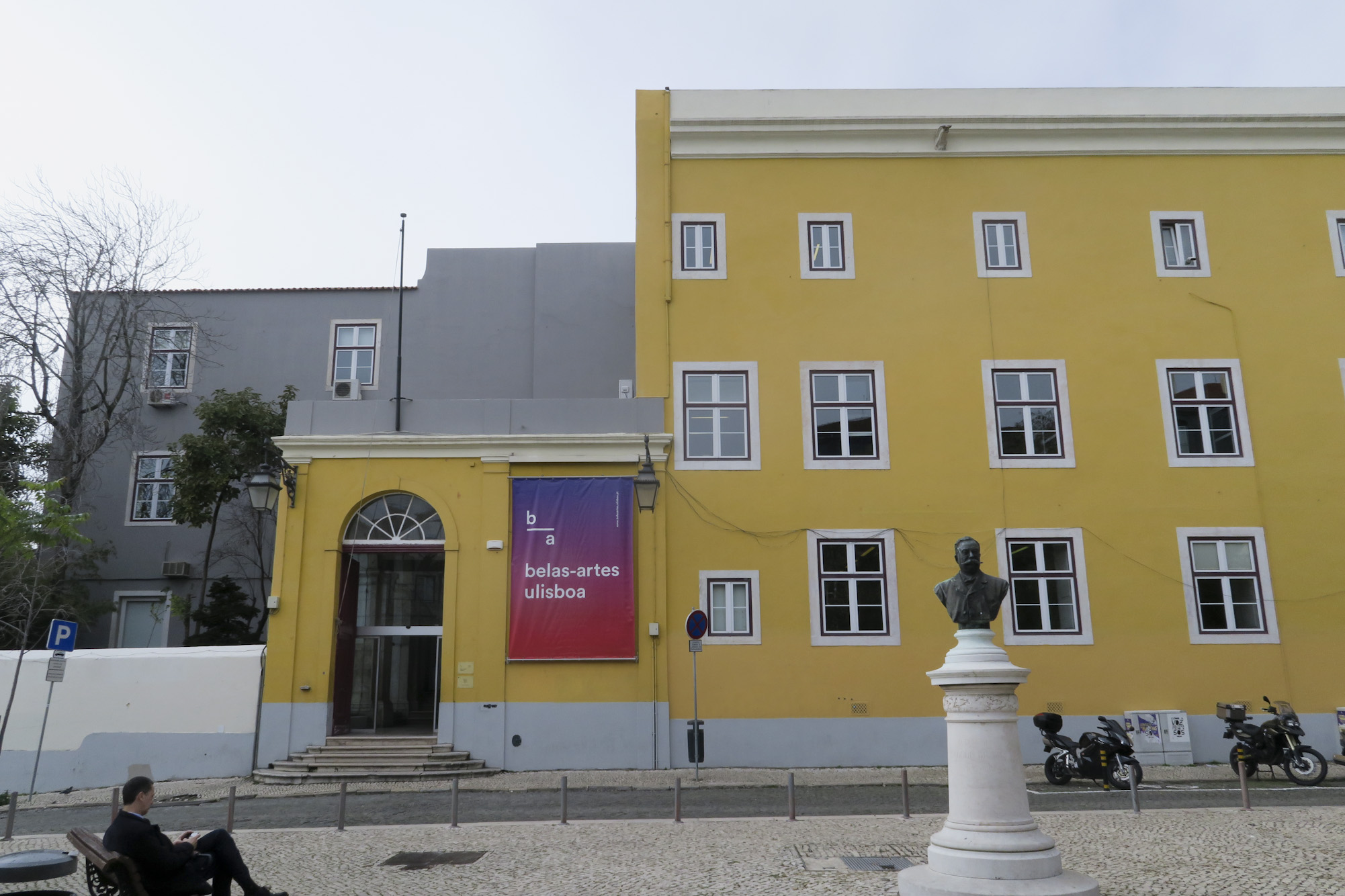

Location
- Largo da Academia Nacional de Belas Artes 4 Lisbon, 1249-058; Portugal
- Coordinates: 38°42′33″N 09°08′25″W

Information
- Established: National Academy of Fine Arts, 1836; Lisbon School of Fine Arts, 1881; Superior School of Fine Arts in Lisbon, 1950; Faculty of Fine Arts of the University of Lisbon, 1992
- Founder: Maria II of Portugal
- Gender: Mixed (from 1896),
- Website: https://www.belasartes.ulisboa.pt/

The Lisbon School of Fine Arts (Escola de Belas-Artes de Lisboa) was a university-level school for painting, sculpture and architecture. It started life in 1836 as part of the National Academy of Fine Arts (Academia Nacional de Belas-Artes) and, since 1992, has formed the Faculty of Fine Arts at the University of Lisbon (Faculdade de Belas-Artes da Universidade de Lisboa). Many of Portugal's most famous artists have passed through the school.

== History ==
The school originated as part of the Academy of Fine Arts in Lisbon. This dates back to 1836, the same year in which the Porto Academy of Fine Arts was established. From the beginning it was housed in the former Convent of Saint Francisco in the Chiado district of the Portuguese capital, with the buildings still suffering from the effects of the 1755 Lisbon earthquake. In 1862 the academy became known as the Royal Academy of Fine Arts: the "Royal" was dropped after the 5 October 1910 revolution that overthrew the monarchy. The Lisbon School of Fine Arts started in 1881 when the academy's teaching sector was made autonomous, although it was not formally established until 1925, when the necessary regulations were published.

The School of Fine Arts and its successors have trained many of Portugal's leading artists, although it did not accept women as students until 1896, forcing women who could afford it to study outside Portugal, often in Paris. From 1950 it was called the Superior School of Fine Arts in Lisbon (Escola Superior de Belas-Artes de Lisboa - ESBAL), with courses in painting, sculpture and architecture being taught. After the 25 April 1974 Carnation Revolution, a broad restructuring of artistic education began at the arts schools in both Lisbon and Porto, with the aim of better aligning artistic and architectural teaching with contemporary standards. Communication design and equipment design courses were created, joining painting, sculpture and architecture. In 1979, the architecture department separated from ESBAL and was integrated into the Technical University of Lisbon, as the Faculty of Architecture.

In turn, ESBAL was incorporated into the University of Lisbon in 1992, becoming the Faculty of Fine Arts. Since 2013, the faculty has offered 8 undergraduate courses, 12 master's courses and a doctoral course with various specialties. It is still housed in the Convent of Saint Francisco. The original Academy of Fine Arts continues to exist as a library, archive, and organizer of literary, and cultural events although it was closed between 1911 and 1932. It remains closely linked with the faculty.

In 2008, a new curriculum review adapted undergraduate and master's degrees to the Bologna Process, a system for harmonizing higher education qualifications in the European Union, with degrees in art and heritage sciences, artistic anatomy, multimedia art, communication design and new media, being created. In the following year, doctoral course following the Bologna model began. In 2012, a master's course in conservation, restoration and production of contemporary art was initiated.

== Impact ==
Successive generations have benefitted from the teaching of the academy and School of Fine Arts and, more recently, of the Faculty of Fine Arts of the University of Lisbon. Among the artists and architects who have studied there are: José Luís Monteiro, Columbano Bordalo Pinheiro, José Malhoa, Veloso Salgado, Amadeo de Souza-Cardoso, Guilherme de Santa-Rita, Eduardo Viana, Abel Manta, Cassiano Branco, Francisco Keil do Amaral, Júlio Pomar, António Dacosta, Helena Almeida, Lourdes Castro, Gonçalo Byrne, Julião Sarmento, Ana Jotta, Pedro Cabrita Reis, Pedro Calapez, José Pedro Croft, Teresa Magalhães, and Maria Helena Vieira da Silva.
