= João Hogan =

Portuguese painter and printmaker

- Self-portrait
- Born: 4 February 1914; Lisbon, Portugal
- Died: 16 June 1988 (aged 74); Lisbon
- Occupation: Artist

João Manuel Navarro Hogan (4 February 1914 in Lisbon – 16 June 1988 in Lisbon) was a Portuguese painter and printmaker.

== Early life ==
João Navarro Hogan was the grandson of Ricardo Hogan and nephew of the painter Álvaro Navarro Hogan. He was born on 4 February 1914, to José Caetano and Bertha Navarro Hogan, who was herself a competent painter. Their home was full of his grandfather's paintings and was often visited by other artists. He attended the Academy of Fine Arts for one year and then the National Society of Fine Arts in Lisbon, while training to become a wood carver.

== Working life ==
Initially Hogan found it difficult to sell his paintings. This was a problem faced by even the best-known artists of the day, such as Almada Negreiros and Mily Possoz, who had to resort to more commercial activities, such as doing book illustrations. He trained as cabinet maker and also developed a talent for carving religious art, selling his work to churches in Portugal. He was also a talented engraver and was a teacher at the Sociedade Cooperativa de Gravadores Portugueses. However, when his paintings became popular, he dedicated himself almost entirely to painting.

His first public exhibits were in 1942, in the 7th Exhibition of Modern Art of the Secretariado da Propaganda Nacional, a body established by the Estado Novo dictatorship. Afterwards he participated in many national and international exhibitions, including the second and fourth São Paulo Art Biennial and International Exhibitions of Brussels and Lausanne (1957) along with shows in other places such as Buenos Aires, Tokyo and Capri.

Mainly a landscape painter, his style can be considered as neo-figurative although his synthesis of forms leads a considerable abstract approach to nature depiction. He employed a bold style, often using strong shades of green, browns and grey, in producing mainly urban landscapes, as well as abstract still-life work. His landscapes were always meditative and silent with an "earthy" feeling within it (often only one quarter of the painting is occupied by the sky) using for example in his preparatory studies close-up photographs of particular rocks that would later form mountains or rocky landscapes.

Hogan was also an important printmaker, especially using woodcuts, and giving along with other contemporary artists an impulse to the growth and teaching of this art form, almost forgotten in his time in Portugal. His prints often depict fantastic motifs (sometimes eerie) rather than landscapes.

== Present-day exhibitions ==
Hogan died on 16 June 1988 in Lisbon. He is represented in the collections of the National Museum of Contemporary Art of the Gulbenkian Foundation, the Casa Muséu Anastácio Gonçalves, the former studio of the painter José Malhoa, and the Museu Nacional de Arte Contemporânea – Museu do Chiado, all in Lisbon and in the National Museum Soares dos Reis in Porto, as well as in several private collections. Outside Portugal, his paintings are in the Hudson River Museum in New York City and the Museo Nacional Centro de Arte Reina Sofía in Madrid.
