= Júlio Pomar =

Portuguese painter (1926–2018)

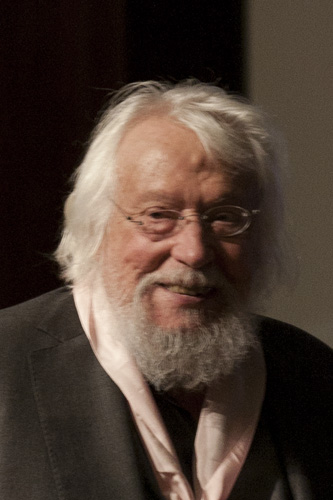
- Júlio Pomar (2013)
- Born: Júlio Artur da Silva Pomar; 10 January 1926; Lisbon, Portugal
- Died: 22 May 2018 (aged 92); Lisbon, Portugal
- Known for: Painting

Júlio Artur da Silva Pomar, GOL, GCM (10 January 1926 – 22 May 2018) was a Portuguese painter and visual artist. He was considered by leading art historian José-Augusto França as the greatest Portuguese painter of his generation.

== Early life and career (1940s and 1950s) ==
Pomar first studied at the Escola Secundária Artística António Arroio, in his native Lisbon. He entered the Superior School of Fine Arts of Lisbon in 1942. The same year, he organised his first exhibition with a group of former colleagues of the António Arroio School, which included painters like Fernando de Azevedo and Marcelino Vespeira. Amongst the notable visitors was Almada Negreiros, who bought Pomar the now-lost painting "Saltimbancos".

In 1944, he moved to the Superior School of Fine Arts of Porto, leaving two years later after a disciplinary process. During this time, he joined a group of artists called the Independents. He participated in their 1944 exhibitions in Porto and Coimbra, and one in 1945, in Lisbon.

From June to October 1945, he was director of "A Tarde"'s art page, helping to promote the work of painters such as German Expressionist George Grosz, the Mexican muralists José Clemente Orozco and David Alfaro Siqueiros, and Brazilian Candido Portinari. He was also involved with magazines such as "Seara Nova", Vértice and Mundo Literário.

He joined the Communist Youth of the Portuguese Communist Party in 1945.

Pomar work became very politically and ideologically engaged during his neo-realist phase, from 1945 to 1957. In 1946, he started a mural at the Cine Teatro Batalha, in Porto, which would be destroyed for political reasons in 1948. He was one of the main organizers and exhibitors of the General Exhibitions of Plastic Arts, from 1946 to 1956, which were the main exhibitions of Portuguese neo-realist painting during this time. One of his paintings, Resistência (Resistance) was apprehended by the Political Police in 1947, at the second exhibition, deemed as "politically subversive". The same year he held his first individual exhibition at the Portugália Gallery, in Porto. He also would be arrested for four months, for being a member of the MUD. He did the official portrait of the Democratic Opposition Presidential candidate, General José Norton de Matos, in 1948. In 1949, he lost his place as a Drawing teacher in technical education because of his political involvement in the campaign.

His first truly neo-realist painting was Gadanheiro (Mower), from 1945, while his most emblematic work in this style would be O Almoço do Trolha (The Lunch of the Trolley), where he worked from 1946 to 1950, and was first exhibited in 1947. Portuguese art historian Rui Mário Gonçalves described it as one of "the most important milestones of Neo-realist painting, with its theme taken from the life of the proletariat, treated with rough material and with a Portinariesque anatomical accentuation of the feet and hands".

During his youth years, he also worked on illustration and ceramics. He became less compromised with time with the neo-realist movement and his last important works in this style were the paintings that he called Ciclo do Arroz (Rice Cicle), from 1952-1955, inspired by several travels to Ribatejo's rice fields in the company of writer Alves Redol. As art historian Alexandre Pomar explained, "Around 1956, without a precise point of rupture in its pictorial production or an explicit departure from the previous political positions, the itinerary of Pomar begins to be oriented in other directions". Between 1954 and 1961 he was married to the artist Alice Jorge.

== After 1960 ==
Pomar had already left neo-realism when he settled in Paris in June 1963. He would return several times to Portugal for the next twenty years. In Paris, he will not join any artistic groups nor practice the artistic languages in vogue, keeping a position of critical distance from the contemporary art movements. This defence of autonomy leads him to remain faithful to the expression of the gesture, to the exploration of the line, to the opening of composition to an informal pictorial language. In 1967 he made the first assemblages with found materials and in the following year, he began two parallel series, one of which was about the convulsions of May 1968. He exhibited once again in Lisbon and, beginning in 1969, he began a regular collaboration with the Gallery 111 of Manuel de Brito, who from now on would represent him in Portugal.

Pomar was in Lisbon when the April 1974 revolution took place. Throughout the 1970s he published a collection of poems, participated in important international exhibitions, most notably at the Bienal de S. Paulo, Brazil, in 1976, and held important solo exhibitions, from which one can highlight the first retrospective of his work, at the Calouste Gulbenkian Foundation, in Lisbon, and the Soares dos Reis National Museum, in Porto, both in 1978.

The painting of Pomar involves figuration that combines image association with elements of surrealism and abstract expressionism. Over recent decades, the work has included diverse themes. These combinations include tigers, rain hats, monkeys, and portraits. Some works reference specific figures, such as the painting Lusitânia no Bairro Alto (1985), which contains portraits of Mário de Sá-Carneiro, Santa-Rita Pintor, and Amadeo de Souza-Cardoso. In 1992 he painted the official portrait of the then President of the Portuguese Republic - Mário Soares.

He died in the Luz Hospital, in Lisbon, on 22 May 2018, aged 92 years old. His death was mourned as a great national loss, being praised, among others, by President Marcelo Rebelo de Sousa.

== Essays and poetry ==
He published three books of essays on painting, Discours sur la Cécité des Peintres (1985), Da Cegueira dos Pintores (1986), and Então e a Pintura? (2003). He published two books of poetry, Alguns Eventos (1992) and TRATAdoDITOeFeito (2003).

== Atelier-Museum Júlio Pomar ==
The Atelier-Museum Júlio Pomar was inaugurated in Lisbon, in 2013, in a building bought by the Municipality of Lisbon in 2000 and refurbished in a project by Álvaro Siza Vieira. The Atelier-Museum has several hundreds of works by the artist, including paintings, drawings, and sculptures, donated by himself to the Júlio Pomar Foundation.

== Public collections ==
Pomar is represented in several museums across Portugal and abroad, including the Chiado Museum, Modern Art Center José de Azeredo Perdigão, Berardo Collection Museum, in Lisbon, Museum of Contemporary Art of Serralves, Porto, Royal Museums of Fine Arts of Belgium, Brussels, Museum of Modern Art, Rio de Janeiro, São Paulo Museum of Art, São Paulo, among others.
