= Portuguese art =

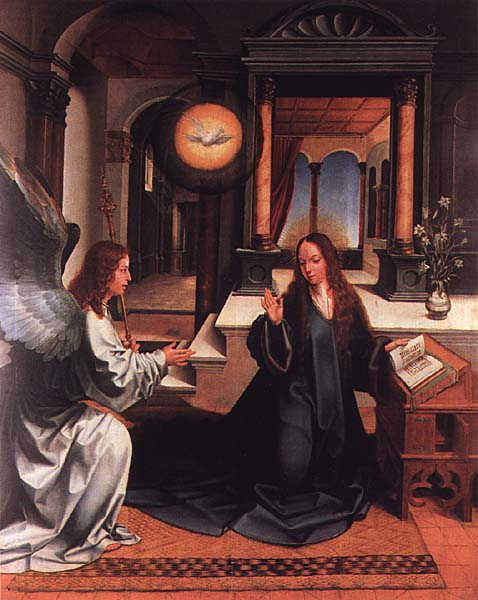
Annunciation, by Jorge Afonso

Portuguese art includes many different styles from many different eras.

== Sculptures ==
Portuguese sculptures can be best analysed by studying the many tombs of the 12th and 14th centuries that are found throughout Portugal. In the late 1700s, the colony of Brazil was the main influence in Portuguese sculpture. This can be seen by the increase in Baroque wooden sculpture during this time. Joaquim Machado de Castro, a famous Portuguese artist who lived around this time and is responsible for a lot of these works.

== Painting ==
Museums exhibiting paintings by Portuguese artists, outside Portugal, include the Hispanic Society of America (New York): Works – Collections – Hispanic Society of America and the Centre Pompidou, Paris. Paintings with their own Wikipedia page are listed here pt:Categoria:Pinturas de Portugal (in Portuguese).

=== 12th to 14th centuries ===
The most ancient Portuguese paintings are in illuminated manuscripts. The Apocalypse of Lorvão (one of the ten most important artistic works in Portugal according to the Europeana project), completed in 1189 in the scriptorium of the Lorvão monastery, near Coimbra, is the only manuscript of the Beatus of Liébana produced in Portugal during the Middle Ages. Some of the illustrations have a profane theme, as is also the case in the Livro das Aves by the same author, and in several "Livros de Linhagens". The Bible of Santa Cruz de Coimbra dates from the 12th century.

The Livro das Aves is a fine example of Romanesque art with Mudejar influences. It is a copy of Hugh of Fouilloy's De avibus, a moral treatise on birds. The livros de lindhagens are genealogies of Portuguese noble families illustrated with their coats of arms. They include Livro Velho de Linhagens (1270-1290), Livro de Linhagens do Deão (1343) and Livro de Linhagens do conde D. Pedro (1344). Cancioneiro da Ajuda is a collection of poems in Galician-Portuguese from the late 13th century with 17 miniatures of musicians.

The Crónica Geral de Espanha de 1344 is a beautifully illustrated historical chronicle also compiled by Pedro Afonso, Count of Barcelos and illegitimate son of King Denis of Portugal.

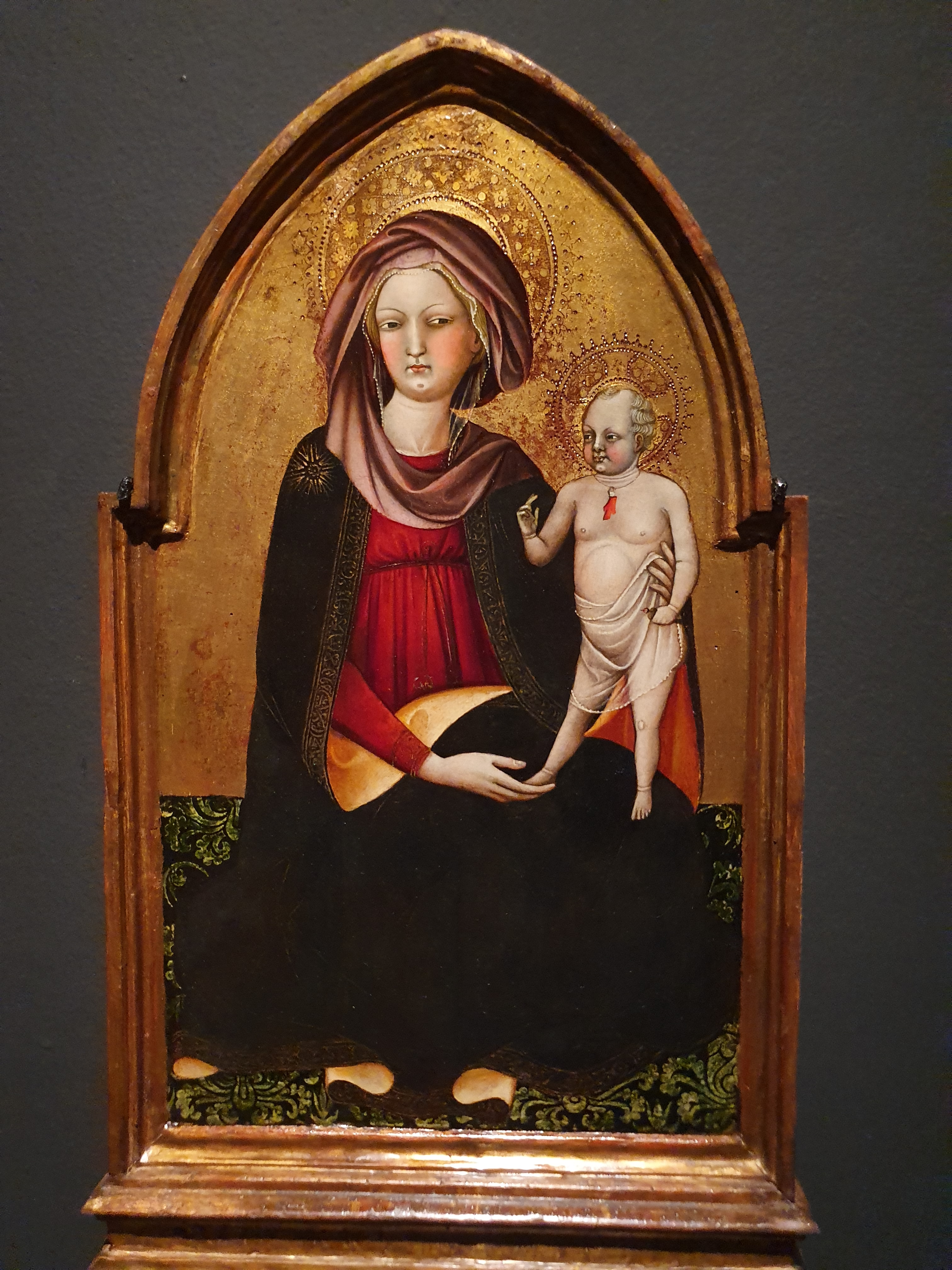
Virgem da Humildade Álvaro Pires de Évora 02

Among the few very early names of Portuguese artists that have survived are those of two architects: Domingos Domingues, designer, between 1308 and 1311, of the cloister of Alcobaça Monastery, built at the request of King Denis of Portugal; and Afonso Domingues, first architect of Batalha Monastery. The Church of São Francisco (Porto) (completed around 1425) was decorated during the reign of João I (1385-1433) with a fresco of Our Lady of the Rose, attributed to António Florentim. It is one of the oldest surviving murals in Portugal. Florentim, as his name suggests, was from Florence but died in Lisbon. Allegory of the Good and Bad Judge is a c. 15th-century fresco in the audience chamber of the old town hall of Reguengos de Monsaraz. There are other frescoes from the late 15th or early 16th century in the Chapel of Our Lady of Glory in Braga Cathedral (geometric panels showing the influence of Mudejar art or in Monsaraz (the Allegory of the Good and Bad Judge) and in the Ermida de Santo André in Beja, also attributed to the "Master of Monsaraz-Beja". The Sintra National Palace has a Coats-of-Arms Hall painted at the beginning of the 16th century, during the transition from Late Gothic to Renaissance. The palace is a mixture of Gothic, Manueline (or Portuguese Late Gothic), Moorish and Mudéjar styles.

=== First Portuguese Renaissance, 15th and early 16th centuries ===
In 1428 the Flemish painter Jan Van Eyck travelled to Portugal to paint a portrait of Isabella of Portugal, daughter of King John I of Portugal in preparation for her marriage to the Duke of Burgundy Philip the Good. There was already a Flemish influence on illuminations. The Livro de Horas de D. Duarte (1426 or 1428) is a very fine example of the art of Flemish illumination of the period to have reached Portugal.

The first known painter may be Álvaro Pires de Évora (fl. 1411-1434, presumably born in Evora). He left no traces until 4 November 1410, when together with Niccolò di Pietro Gerini, Lippo d'Andrea, Ambrogio di Baldese and Scolaio di Giovanni he painted frescoes, now lost, on the façade of the Palazzo del Ceppo in Prato (Tuscany). He seems to have grown in Portugal and spent his entire career in Italy. The Madonna triptych in the Herzog Anton Ulrich Museum, Braunschweig, bears the date 1434. Álvaro Pires is mentioned in Giorgio Vasari's Le Vite de' più Eccellenti Pittori, Scultori e Architettori (1568) and by José da Cunha Taborda, in Regras da arte da pintura, 1815. Around thirty works have been found by this artist. The Annunciation (c.1430-1434, tempera and gold on panel) was bought by the Museu Nacional de Arte Antiga, and Saint Como recently went on sale. Álvaro Pires de Évora may be the Master of Lourinhã, who painted Políptico do Convento de Santiago de Palmela, Tríptico dos Infantes and Tríptico da Igreja de Nossa Senhora do Pópulo.

The Lisbon Bible (1483) is considered "the most accomplished codex of the Portuguese school of medieval Hebrew illumination" and is now in the British Library. Samuel ben Samuel Ibn Musa (Samuel the Scribe), probably a Jew living in Portugal before the expulsion and forced conversions of December 1496, copied the biblical text but we do not seem to know who decorated the pages with birds and other animals and, mostly, flowers. The Foral of Évora (1501), decorated with flowers, animals and cherubs, is also remarkable.

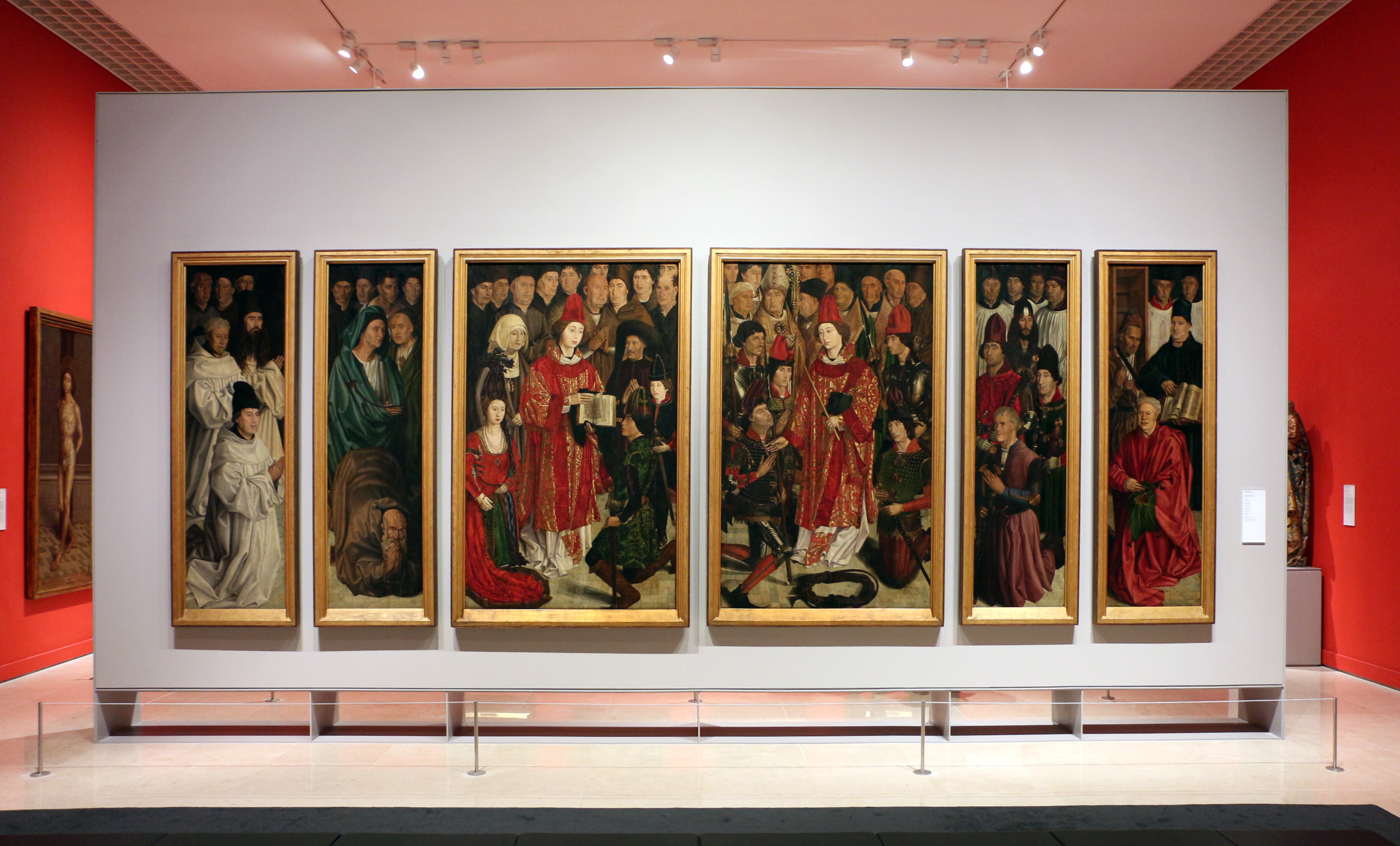
The Saint Vincent Panels at the National Museum of Ancient Art.

The first famous Portuguese painter is Nuno Gonçalves (active c. 1450 - died before 1492), whose work was influenced by Flemish art, as were many of his successors. Gonçalves is best known for his polyptych, Saint Vincent Panels (now in the Museu Nacional de Arte Antiga (MNAA), six paintings showing a group of 58 figures representing the court and the various social classes of 15th-century Portuguese society in a monumental and solemn assembly around the figure of Saint Vincent, who is represented twice. The painting is characterized by figures with expressive faces and a detailed definition of the costumes, marking the beginning of the Renaissance in Portugal. The same museum owns a Martírio de São Vicente atado à coluna, around 1470. (Vincent of Saragossa is the patron saint of Lisbon).

The Tríptico de Santa Clara is still by an anonymous painter.

Jorge Afonso (c. 1470–1540) is the painter of the altarpiece at the Madre de Deus Convent in Lisbon (now at the MNAA). The church of the Monastery of Jesus of Setúbal was decorated with a 14-panel, painted altarpiece by him (Retábulo do Convento de Jesus). The MNAA houses Jorge Afonso's Adoração dos Pastores (Adoration of the Shepherds), which shows a tiled floor in perspective and realistic male faces, while the Virgin has a gothic touch. In the third shepherd's left hand are what may be a tin milk pail and spoons, while the second has a rebec on the floor in front of him, and there is a concert of angel musicians in the opposite corner of the canvas.

A whole generation of Portuguese painters was educated in Afonso's workshop, including Cristóvão de Figueiredo, Garcia Fernandes, Gregório Lopes and Jorge Leal (known for his Adoração dos Reis Magos in the MNAA), Gaspar Vaz (credited with the paintings in the Convent of São João de Tarouca) and possibly even the famous Vasco Fernandes (c. 1475 – c. 1542), better known as Grão Vasco. The identity of the Master of the Altarpiece of St Auta is still unknown.

The MNAA owns Cristóvão de Figueiredo's The Marriage of Saint Ursula with Prince Conan (1522-1525). His polyptych for the Monastery of the Holy Cross in Coimbra (1521-1530) still shows the influence of Dürer. Figueiredo may be the Master of the Altarpiece of Santa Auta. He collaborated with Garcia Fernandes on The Resurrection of Christ (1530-1535) which was bought by the Louvre in 2023 (RFML.PE.2023.26.1).

The MNAA houses a Martírio de S. Sebastião by Gregório Lopes, who also painted a Virgin and Child with the angels, and the Adoration of the Magi in a village in Auvergne. He collaborated with Jorge Leal on the Visitation. Lopes introduced the «Primeiro Maneirismo de Antuérpia» (First Antwerp Mannerism) to Portugal. Between 1533 and 1534, he collaborated with Garcia Fernandes and Cristóvão de Figueiredo, in Lamego, on the panels for the Monastery of Ferreirim.

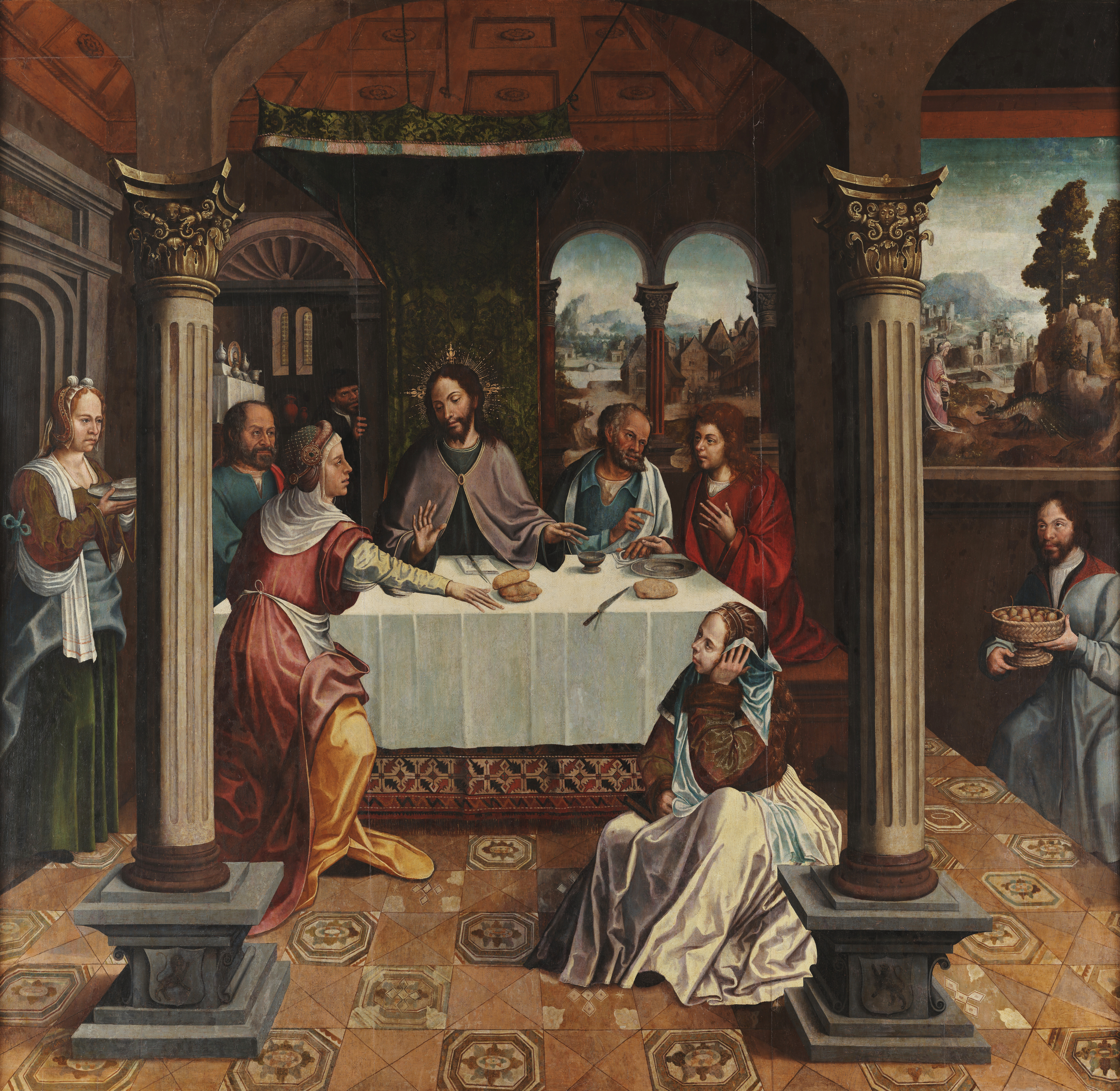
Jesus in the House of Marta (c. 1535), Grão Vasco

Grão Vasco moved from a markedly Nordic influence - clearly seen in the altarpiece of Viseu Cathedral, where he worked with painters of Flemish origin - to an Italianising influence. The arrival of Miguel da Silva from Rome to the Bishopric of Viseu (1525-1540), the patron who, among other things, commissioned him to paint the five great altarpieces for the cathedral, including that of St. Peter, was a decisive event in his aesthetic career. The Last Supper dates from 1535. A clearer shift towards the Italian model only began to be noticed around 1540, when the rigorous classicism of the High Renaissance had already disappeared and the dominant trend in Italy was already Mannerism. He painted several triptychs (Tríptico da Lamentação com Santos Franciscanos, and Tríptico do Calvário).

Francisco Henriques (active 1508–1518), born in Amsterdam and trained in Bruges perhaps under Gerard David, arrived in Portugal around 1500. He led the workshop for Viseu Cathedral's altarpiece, mentoring the young Vasco Fernandes. In 1518, he was commissioned for a prestigious project in Lisbon, collaborating with Garcia Fernandes, Cristóvão de Figueiredo, and Gregório Lopes. Unfortunately he died of the plague in 1518. The MNAA houses quite a few of his paintings, including Ultima ceia (Last Supper, c.1508) and Paixão dos Cinco Mártires de Marrocos (c1508). He also painted Nossa Senhora das Neves. The painting Inferno is attributed to one "Anonymous master of the Inferno", possibly one of Francisco Henriques's pupils.

Unlike the previous painters, Frei Carlos (active 1517-1540), a Hyeronimite monk, had no contact with Jorge Afonso or his pupils: he worked almost exclusively for his monastic order. Nevertheless, his style is similar to Afonso's in works such as Calvary Triptych, Christ's Ascension and Bom pastor (The Good Shepherd), 1520-30.

As for Vicente Gil, he was active in Coimbra between 1491 and 1518 and is remembered notably for his Adoração dos Reis Magos. He is probably the Master of Sardoal.

It is now accepted that the Livro do Armeiro-Mor (1509), which contains the Portuguese Armorial, is the work of a Portuguese illuminator, João do Cró. Another such book was the Livro da Nobreza e Perfeiçam das Armas (1521- 1541) by António Godinho, clerk to King João III. The 1675 Thesouro de Nobreza is a very late example of a manuscript armorial.

The Book of Fortresses (1509–1510 by Duarte de Armas) contains sketches or outlines of all the 56 Portuguese border castles, these sketches include elements of perspective and topographical awareness.

The Livro de Horas de D. Manuel, attributed to António de Holanda (between c. 1517 and c. 1538). The first historical reference to him dates from 1518, when he was in Portugal. He probably died in Portugal, where his son Francisco de Holanda was born.

"In his treatise Da pintura antiga (1548), Francisco de Holanda placed illumination at the forefront of 'all genres and modes of painting' and by no means considered it a minor art. Unlike in other European countries, the first half of the 16th century was Portugal's golden age of illumination. Until the 16th century, Portuguese illumination was of foreign origin, firstly Cistercian, then imported from Flanders and France. But at the beginning of the 16th century, the Portuguese political and cultural reality, the major administrative, legislative and heraldic reforms promulgated by D. Manuel and also the nautical activity necessitated by the Great Discoveries created a climate favourable to the development of Portuguese illumination in new areas,". One of King Manuel I's reforms was the "Leitura Nova" he ordered in 1527: it involved the systematic copying, updating, and preservation of royal and municipal records aiming to centralize and standardize governance and thus strengthen royal authority. Deswarte goes on to examine the foreign influences on Portuguese illumination: Ghent-Bruges illumination and Florentine illumination known from the Belém Bible made by Attavanti for King Manuel I, the influence of numerous copies of Italian, Flemish and French engravings (Jacques I Androuet du Cerceau) and of Albrecht Dürer.

=== Mannerism ===
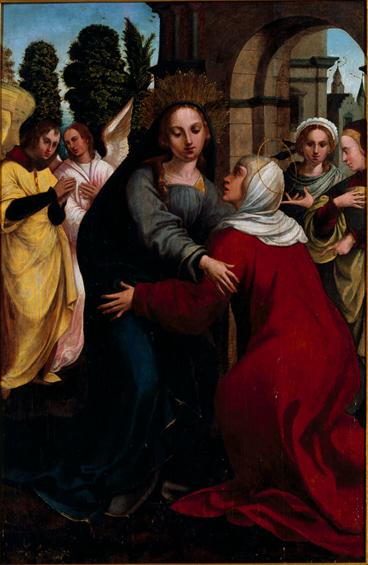
The Visitação (1520) by Diogo de Contreiras.

Portuguese Renaissance painters were influenced by Flemish and, increasingly, Italian artists but fully embraced European trends only when Mannerism emerged. Painting in the mid-16th century reflected efforts to modernise Portuguese culture, paralleling developments in architecture and goldsmithing, while embracing humanist ideals. In the third generation of the century, artists incorporated Italian influences, but social upheaval - marked by Spanish domination (due to the Iberian Union) and the Inquisition (the Portuguese Inquisition was formally established in 1536) - replaced the optimism of the Manueline era, fuelled by maritime expansion and Portugal's European prominence, with bitterness and rigid counter-reformist ideology. The decline of the Lisbon court and the retreat of the nobility to provincial courts first encouraged regional workshops, contributing to the diversity of art. Resentment grew among the Portuguese nobility and populace, culminating in the 1640 revolt that restored Portuguese independence under the Braganza dynasty. Despite these challenges, Mannerism triumphed in the 1550s, became Portugal's dominant style until the early 17th century and laid the foundations for the dynamic compositions and dramatic contrasts of the Baroque.

Diogo de Contreiras, formerly known as the Master of Saint Quentin, innovated in the use of colour, gave figures a new expressiveness and experimented with composition as never before. He taught at the College of Arts of the University of Coimbra (founded in 1542) from 1545 to 1549 and from 1551 to 1555. The Pregação de São João Batista (Diogo de Contreiras) is in the MNAA while the Políptico da Capela da Madre de Deus do Caniço is in Caniço (Santa Cruz) and the Díptico do Retábulo de Porto da Luz in a private collection.

Another painter, identified as Mestre de Abrantes, is deeply rooted in the style of Gregório Lopes. His works show a growing predilection for agitated groups of figures, vivid and acid colouring, formal distortions reminiscent of Mannerism, and a technique characterised by broad, free and almost expressionist brushstrokes. He painted the five panels for the Misericórdia de Abrantes (possibly the Igreja da Misericórdia), dated shortly after 1550, two Calvaries and a Circumcision (MNAA), a Descent from the Cross in the Sacred Art Museum of Funchal, and a hagiographic scene of St. Adrian in the Church of Póvoa de Santo Adrião. He is also credited with the Políptico do Arco da Calheta (Mestre de Abrantes), located in the Church of São Brás (Saint Blaise) in Arco da Calheta.

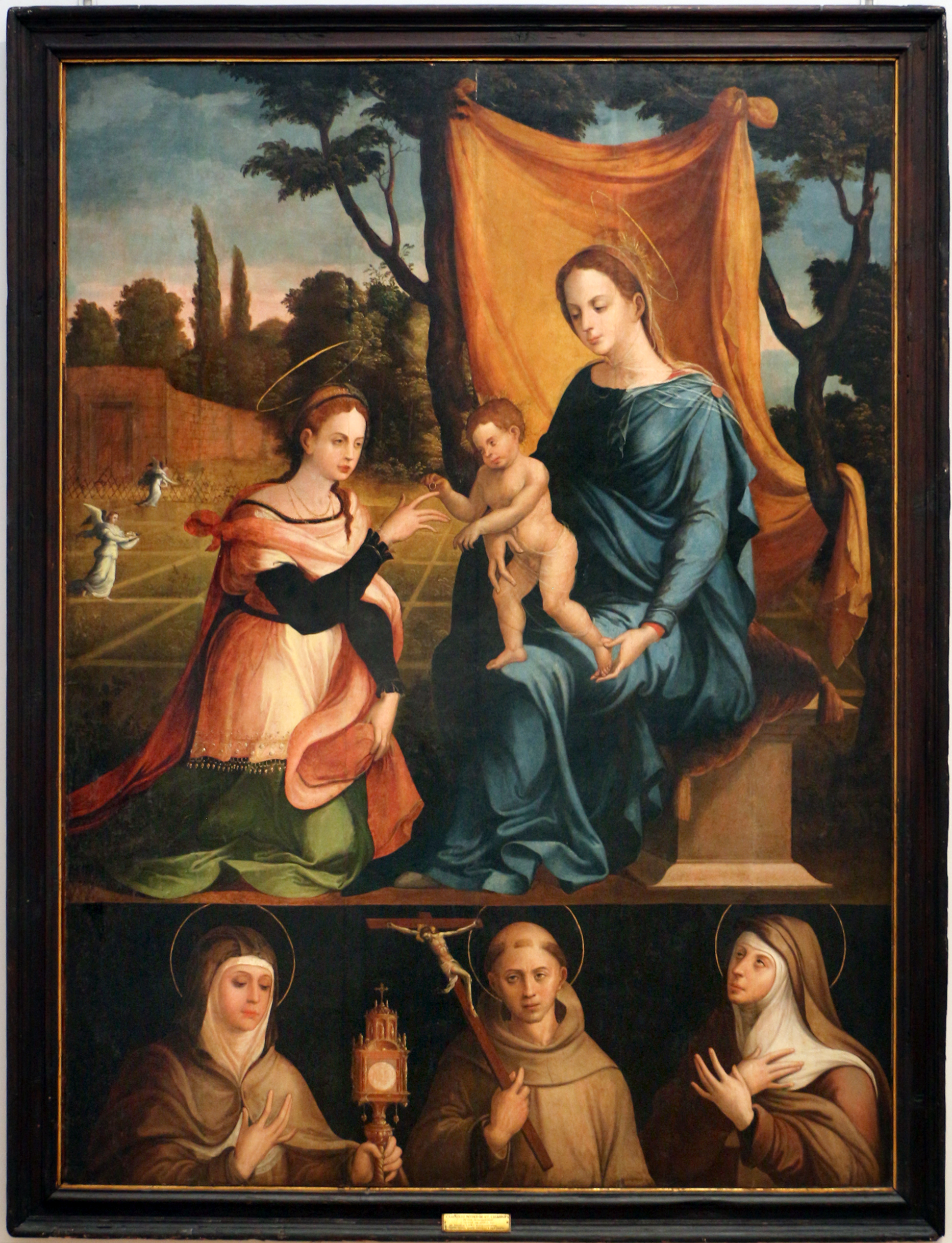
The Mystical Marriage of Saint Catherine (1560) by Gaspar Dias.

Gaspar Dias was a Mannerist painter from Portugal, active between 1560 and 1591. He was impressed by Raphael and Michelangelo when King João III sent him to study in Italy. Upon his return, he painted several oil paintings for the Royal Monastery of Belém and other churches. Among his paintings are Martírio de Santa Catarina and The Apparition of the Angel to St. Roch in the Igreja de São Roque, Lisbon, the latter selected as one of the ten most important artistic works in Portugal by the Europeana project. António Campelo was also sent to Italy.

Also noteworthy is António Nogueira, whose works were clearly mannerist, with intense compositional dynamism. They are characterised by a strong tension between forms and an agitated composition of figures and clothes in movement against geometric backgrounds. Other mannerist painters include Francisco Venegas (born in Spain), Simão Rodrigues), Diogo Teixeira, whose Virgin in Glory is housed in the Museum of São Roque.

Francisco de Campos, possibly a pupil of Maarten van Heemskerck, was a Flemish Mannerist painter active in Portugal, who introduced a bold, anti-naturalistic style characterised by unusual proportions, complex spatiality and vivid acid tones. His works are found in the Museu Rainha Dona Leonor (Alentejo), the Museum of Sacred Art in the Castelo de Santiago do Cacém, and various churches. Campos also painted Portugal's only known 16th-century profane mural at the Paço de São Miguel (Évora) in 1578, with allegorical frescoes celebrating mythology, nature, and historical events like the conquest of Tunis in 1535. His work marked Portugal's definitive embrace of an internationalist artistic cycle.

Jooris van der Straeten was a Flemish portrait painter for the ruling houses of Portugal (in the 1550s), Spain and France. His portrait of Prince Don Carlos in armour in the Convent of Las Descalzas Reales was previously attributed to Cristóvão de Morais, who painted numerous portraits for the kings, queens, and princes of Portugal, as did the Netherlandish Antonis Mor and his Spanish pupil Alonso Sánchez Coello in the early 1550s. Another portrait painter was Domingos Vieira who came into contact with the work of the late El Greco when he spent some time in Spain.

There were other important Mannerist painters, such as the Spaniard (working in Portugal) Francisco Venegas, best known for the illusionist painting of the wooden ceiling of the Igreja de São Roque in Lisbon (1584-1590). Between 1592 and 1600, Domingos Vieira Serrão worked with Simão de Abreu on the painted vaults of the ambulatory of the Convent of Christ in Tomar and various chapels and altars in the same convent. Together with Simão Rodrigues, he worked on several frescoes that were destroyed. In 1602, together with Simão Rodrigues and others, he founded the Guild of Saint Luke. Pedro Nunes, (1586-1637) entered the workshop of the painter Manuel Fernandes, where he trained until 1606, then spent several years in Rome and finally returned to Portugal. Nunes' last works showed the influence of Baroque tenebrism.

=== Baroque painting ===
The 17th century opened with an event of great symbolic significance. In 1602, he had been among the nine painters who founded the Brotherhood of St. Luke, a confraternity uniting Lisbon's painters, and in 1612, a delegation of 12 painters, led by Fernão Gomes (pintor) (a Portuguese Mannerist painter of Spanish origin, born in Alburquerque in 1548 and active in Lisbon until his death in 1612), petitioned the Lisbon City Council to sever their corporate ties and recognise painting as a "Liberal Art." At the same time, a similar petition was presented in Porto. This marked a significant shift in attitudes, signalling the abandonment of medieval production traditions and a move towards modernity. Although their demands were not immediately fulfilled, the effort elevated the social status of artists, allowing them to align themselves with the nobility by pursuing a 'superior' artistic activity. Gomes is also noted for his portrait of Camões, famously known as the Portrait painted in red. The original is lost, the version known today is a 19th-century copy.

Portugal went through a deep crisis between 1580 and the mid-17th century, caused mainly by the loss of the throne to Philip II of Spain in 1580. Portugal was drawn into Spain's wars, which resulted in the Dutch targeting Portugal's overseas empire and conquering north-eastern Brazil in the 1630s. Portugal's economy, heavily dependent on colonial trade, weakened significantly, while the Dutch and English, who were overtaking Portugal's maritime empire, contributed to a sense of national decline. The Portuguese nobility retreated to their country estates, isolated from Spain and the world. The Portuguese Restoration War began in 1640, with John IV of Portugal proclaimed king, but the end of the Iberian Union did not occur until 1668. This may explain why the Baroque style developed later in Portugal than in the rest of Europe.

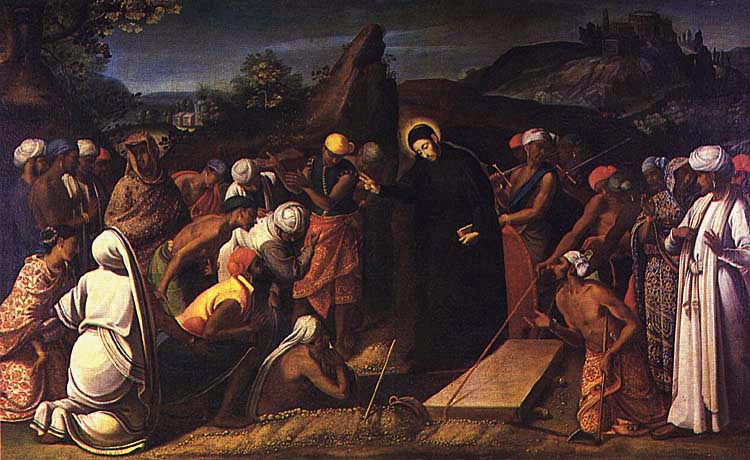
Miracle of St. Francis Xavier (1619). by André Reinoso.

André Reinoso (c. 1590- after 1650) was Portugal's first Baroque painter. In particular, he created a cycle of twenty paintings (Ciclo pictórico de André Reinoso) on the life and legend of Saint Francis Xavier, all painted in 1619, which served as a model for many others painted later. They were made for the Church of São Roque, which is now part of the São Roque Museum in Lisbon.

Under the influence of the Counter-Reformation, art moved towards naturalism and decorum, rejecting the excesses of Mannerism. Italian influence dominated, and individual creativity was curtailed to prevent heresy, favouring a style that glorified the triumph of the Church. Several painters got into trouble with the Inquisition for allegedly deviating from dogma. One of these was Domingos Vieira (who spent some time in Spain and came into contact with the work of the late El Greco). In this religious context, tenebrism played a role, enhancing the drama and poignancy of the images and inspiring greater piety in the devotee. An oil painter from Lisbon, Gregório Antunes was educated in the late Mannerist style and co-founded the Brotherhood of St. Luke in 1602. He executed works for the Igreja e Convento de Nossa Senhora de Jesus do Sítio in Santarém, showcasing Spanish-influenced Tenebrism. He is also credited with two Tenebrist panels in Lisbon Cathedral's Treasury.

Also popular, through Flemish and Spanish influence, was the vanitas, a mixture of still life and moralising allegory, drawing the viewer's attention to the vanity of earthly things.

In the secular realm, the exploration of a wider variety of subjects began, with growing interest in portraiture, genre painting, landscapes, and still life (e.g., Baltazar Gomes Figueira). Decorative mural painting, influenced by the Italian Mannerist grotesque style, evolved uniquely in Portugal and was extensively applied, especially for ceiling decoration. This genre, known as brutesco, spread widely via engravings and operated under loose conventions, free from ecclesiastical censorship, allowing imaginative expression. Brutesco gained popularity in architectural and decorative contexts, including azulejos (painted tiles), stuccoes, and carved woodwork, often tied to earlier oil painting traditions. It reflected artistic experimentation and resistance to Spanish domination. Gabriel del Barco, who painted the ceiling of the Igreja de São Mamede in Évora, and António de Oliveira Bernardes are among those who explored the brutesco style.

In times of economic hardship, sculpture and altarpiece painting declined while Portuguese art shifted from Spanish (and thus international) influences to national forms inspired by Romanesque and Manueline styles. The new Baroque altarpieces, which emphasised gilded woodwork for affordable splendour, reinforced Portuguese identity.

Among the most important painters of this period were André Reinoso, Domingos Vieira, Domingos da Cunha, known for religious paintings and portraits: one of King John IV, and a self-portrait; José de Avelar Rebelo; Pedro Nunes; Baltazar Gomes Figueira and his daughter Josefa de Óbidos; Marcos da Cruz and his pupil Bento Coelho da Silveira.

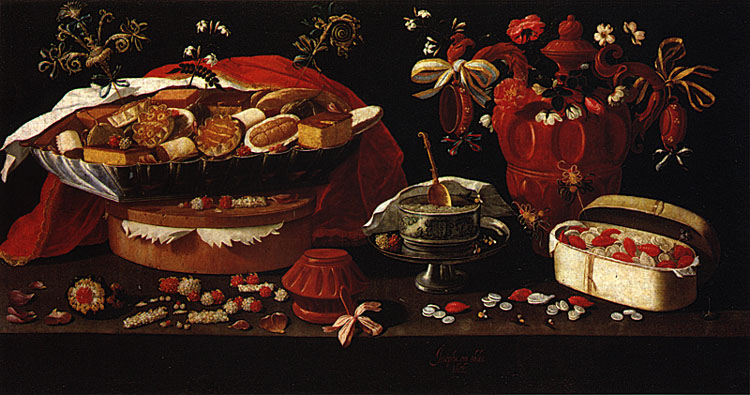
Still Life with Sweets (c. 1679). by Josefa de Óbidos.

Baltazar Gomes Figueira, born in Óbidos, trained in Seville between 1626 and 1634 under Francisco Herrera the Elder, who was also his daughter Josefa de Óbidos’s godfather. He likely interacted with artists such as Francisco de Zurbarán, Juan del Castillo, and Francisco Pacheco. Returning to Portugal in 1634, he worked for the House of Braganza at the courts of John IV and Alfonso VI, serving both as a painter and as an inventory manager for the Royal Palace's art collections. He created religious paintings, landscapes, and numerous still lives, one of which is held by the Louvre. His works include the altarpiece of the Chapel of São Brás in Bombarral, which has been restored and attributed to him. The MNAA has acquired (2024) The Month of April by Baltasar Gomes Figueira and Josefa de Óbidos.

Marcos da Cruz was trained in late mannerist and naturalist circles (Simão Rodrigues, André Reinoso) before adopting proto-Baroque tenebrism. He served the ducal and later royal house of Bragança, Lisbon's high aristocracy and major religious institutions, and trained oil painters as well as tile painters such as Gabriel del Barco and António de Oliveira Bernardes. The luminous chromaticism of his paintings was decisive in the incorporation of Baroque classicism into the work of Bento Coelho da Silveira and António de Oliveira Bernardes. Bento Coelho da Silveira's works are mostly in oil on canvas, which was an innovative material at the time. He left a large body of work (list pt:Lista de pinturas de Bento Coelho da Silveira).

As for Josefa de Óbidos (1630-1684), who was active until at least 1680, she was one of the very few women of her time to gain independence and professional respect as an artist. A persistent follower of Tenebrism, she left works (list pt:Lista de pinturas de Josefa de Óbidos) of delicate poetry in scenes from the life of Jesus and in still lifes, but she was also capable of moments of great expressiveness, as evidenced by her Calvary. Some of her paintings are on copper plates (including her Maria Madalena confortada pelos Anjos in the Louvre) and São Francisco de Assis e Santa Clara (1647) while her 1678 Calvary is painted on a wood panel. Other paintings are on canvas like her Christ at the Column (1679) and the 1680 Agnus Dei in Braga, Agnus Dei and Still life with sweets and terracotta pots (1676, selected as one of the ten most important works of art in Portugal by the Europeana project).

==== The Joanine Baroque ====
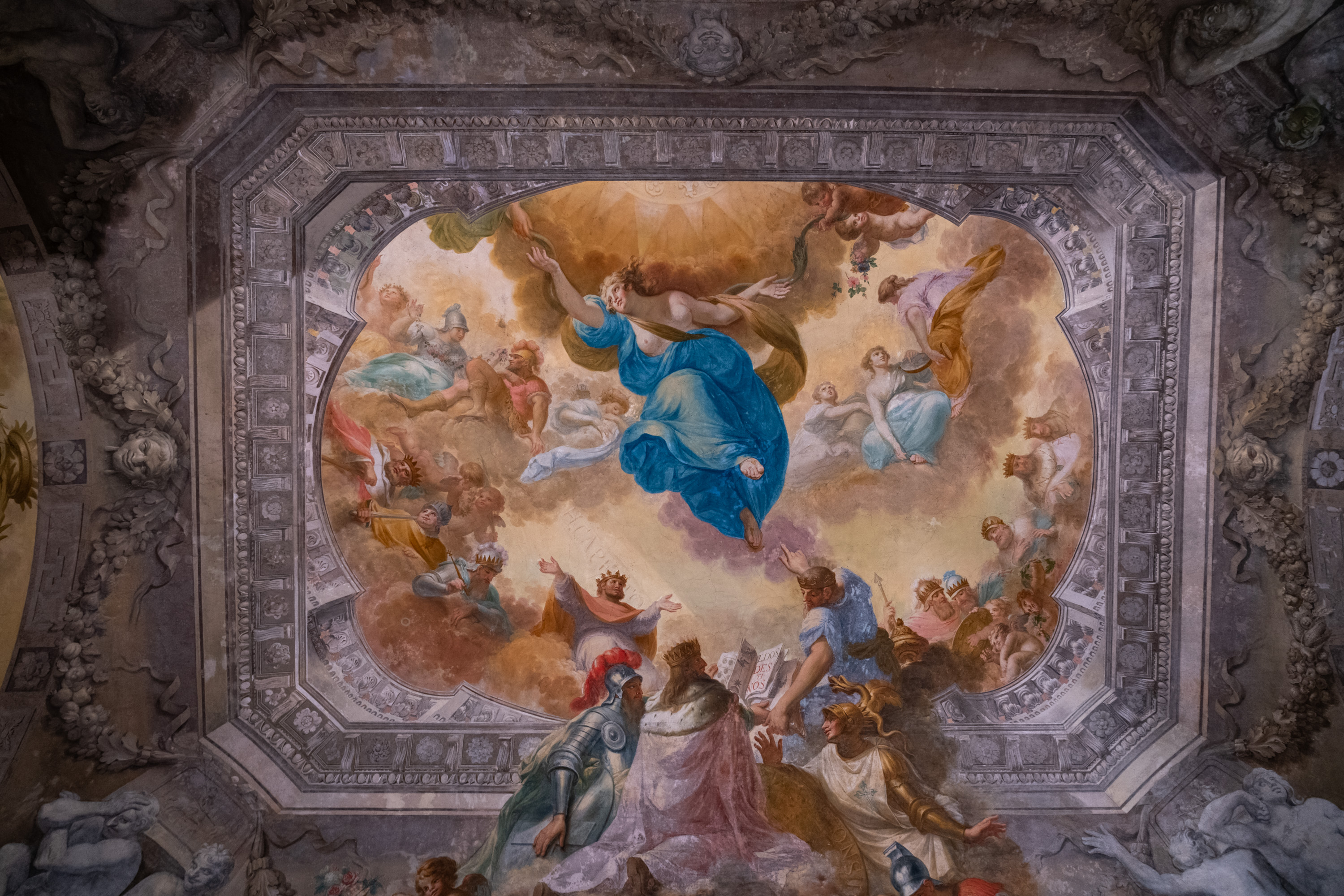
Ceiling painting at the Palace of Mafra.

The Restoration of Independence and the accession of King João V marked a significant shift in the socio-political landscape, firmly establishing the Baroque as the prevailing artistic style. The Baroque shed its earlier traces of isolationism and timidity, embracing new ideas that would culminate in remarkable originality during the first half of the 18th century. This era, known as the Joanine Baroque, was fueled by the influx of gold from the Brazilian colony, ushering in a phase of unprecedented splendor under the long reign of King João V. A passionate lover and discerning connoisseur of the arts, he was not only capable of offering critical insights but also served as a devout patron of the Church and an autocrat with ambitions to rival France's Louis XIV. During his reign (1706-1750), Portuguese painting once again flourished, marked by vigor and ingenuity. Art became a powerful instrument for showcasing the king's magnanimity and grandeur. One of João V's most notable legacies is the monumental Palace of Mafra, a combined palace and convent. Its construction became a driving force for the revitalization of Portuguese arts, symbolizing the cultural and artistic ambitions of his reign.

During this period, the colour palette diversified and brightened, marking the end of Tenebrism. Forms become more fluid, compositions display greater ingenuity, and a dynamic, expansive sense emerges. There is also an evident attempt to revive classical values. André Gonçalves, a prolific artist, stands out as one of the finest representatives of the Joanine Baroque. His influence was significant, fostering a school of thought in which José da Costa Negreiros (1714-1759) was a prominent figure. Negreiros's most notable works include the paintings created for the Coach of King João V (housed in the National Coach Museum) and the canvases in the side chapels of the Santuário do Senhor Jesus da Pedra in Óbidos, dedicated to Our Lady of the Conception and The Death of St. Joseph (The main chapel, dedicated to Calvary, features a canvas by André Gonçalves). He also painted Our Lady of Mercy in one of the chapels of the Lisbon Cathedral, as well as the ceilings of the Palace of Correio-Mor in Loures and the chapter house of the Convento de São Domingos de Benfica.

While Rome was the primary centre of inspiration during this phase, the artistic currents of the French and Dutch Baroque also left their mark.

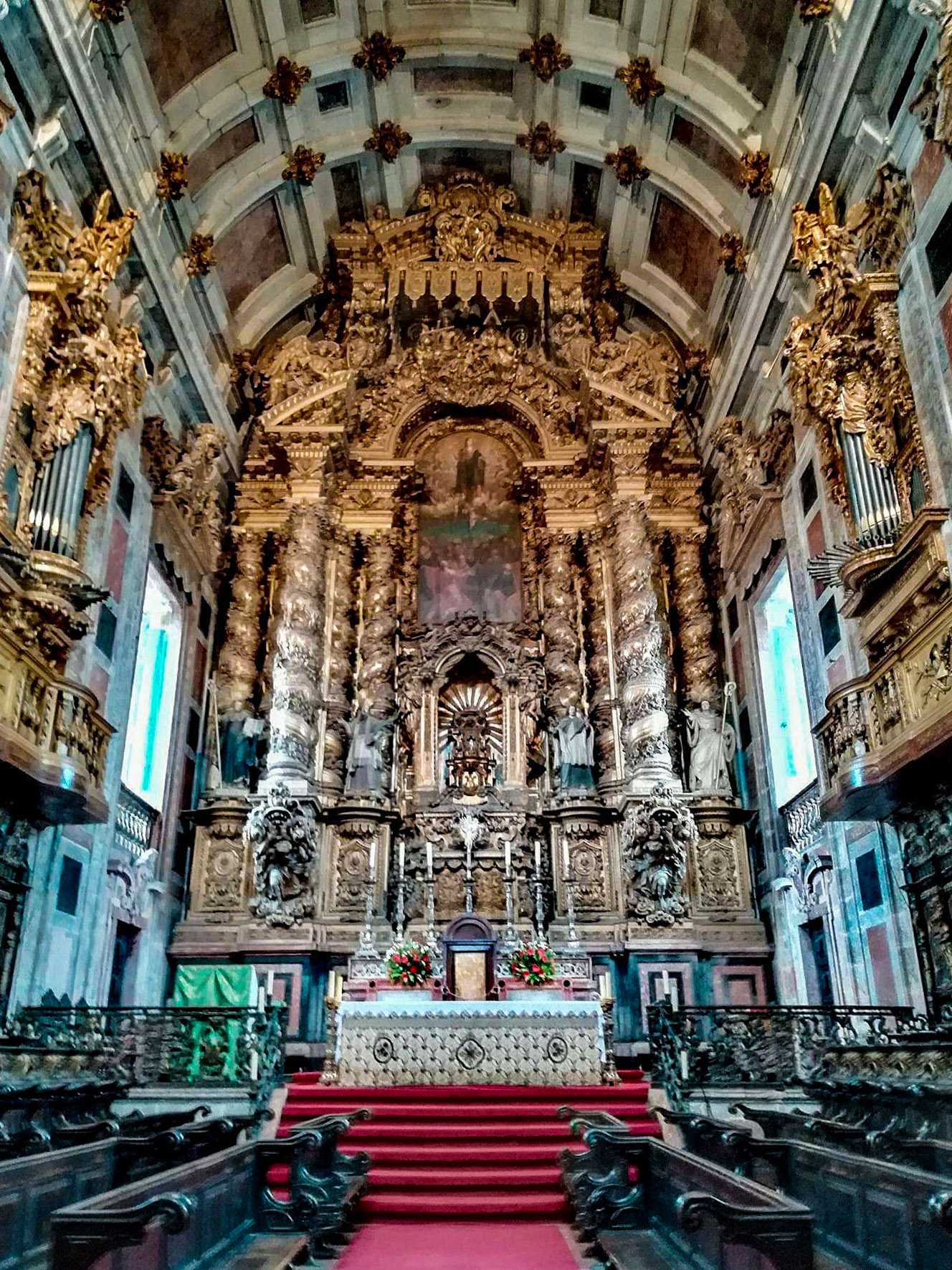
Main chapel of Porto Cathedral.

Félix da Costa (1639–1702), son of painter Luís da Costa (translator of Dürer's Albrecht Dürer#Four Books on Human Proportion), sought to elevate Portuguese artistic studies. An engraver and altarpiece painter, his works are largely unknown today. He wrote Antiquity of the Art of Painting (1696), promoting the dignity of painting and advocating for an Academy modelled on the French example—a goal unrealized in his lifetime. His manuscript, published only in 1967 (by Yale University), reflects deep erudition but had no contemporary impact, but the Academy of Portugal in Rome was founded in 1712. It became a vital outpost of Joanine art, facilitating direct contact with leading European masters and shaping key Portuguese painters of the era, such as Inácio de Oliveira Bernardes and José de Almeida. Other notable figures include Jerónimo da Silva, the Italian Giovanni Battista Pachini (João Baptista Pachini, creator of the Allegories of Moral Values on the coffered ceiling of the Porto Cathedral chapter house, 1737), Francisco Pinto Pereira, Bernardo Pereira Pegado, and Pierre-Antoine Quillard, a pioneer of Rococo in Portugal.

The most notable chapel in the Igreja de São Roque is the Capela de São João Baptista, designed by Nicola Salvi (renowned for the Trevi Fountain) and Luigi Vanvitelli for the church of Sant'Antonio dei Portoghesi in Rome. Constructed between 1742 and 1747, it was consecrated in 1744, then disassembled in 1747, shipped to Lisbon, and reassembled and reconsecrated in 1750, even if some of the mosaic panels, created by Mattia Moretti based on designs by Agostino Masucci, were only completed in August 1752. The chapel introduced the Rocaille (or Rococo) style to Portugal and features an array of the most exquisite ornamental stones.

This period also saw the popularization of azulejos and the introduction of the quadratura, marking a shift from the brutesco tradition. This striking and novel style was introduced in Lisbon by Italian Vicenzo Baccarelli and further developed by Nicolau Nasoni, a Florentine architect and painter, as well as Manuel Xavier Caetano Fortuna, António Lobo, and Lourenço da Cunha in other parts of Portugal. In 1740, da Cunha painted the ceiling of the Church of Our Lady of the Cape, regarded as "one of the finest examples of trompe-l'œil from Joanine Portugal." He was also the father of José Anastácio da Cunha, the renowned mathematician.

==== Pombaline Baroque and Rococo ====
On November 1, 1755, Lisbon was devastated by an unprecedented earthquake followed by a massive fire that left 10,000 dead, the city in ruins, and many works of art destroyed. King Joseph I, with the decisive leadership of the Marquis of Pombal, spearheaded an ambitious reconstruction effort which was entrusted to the architects and military engineers Manuel da Maia, Carlos Mardel, and Eugénio dos Santos.

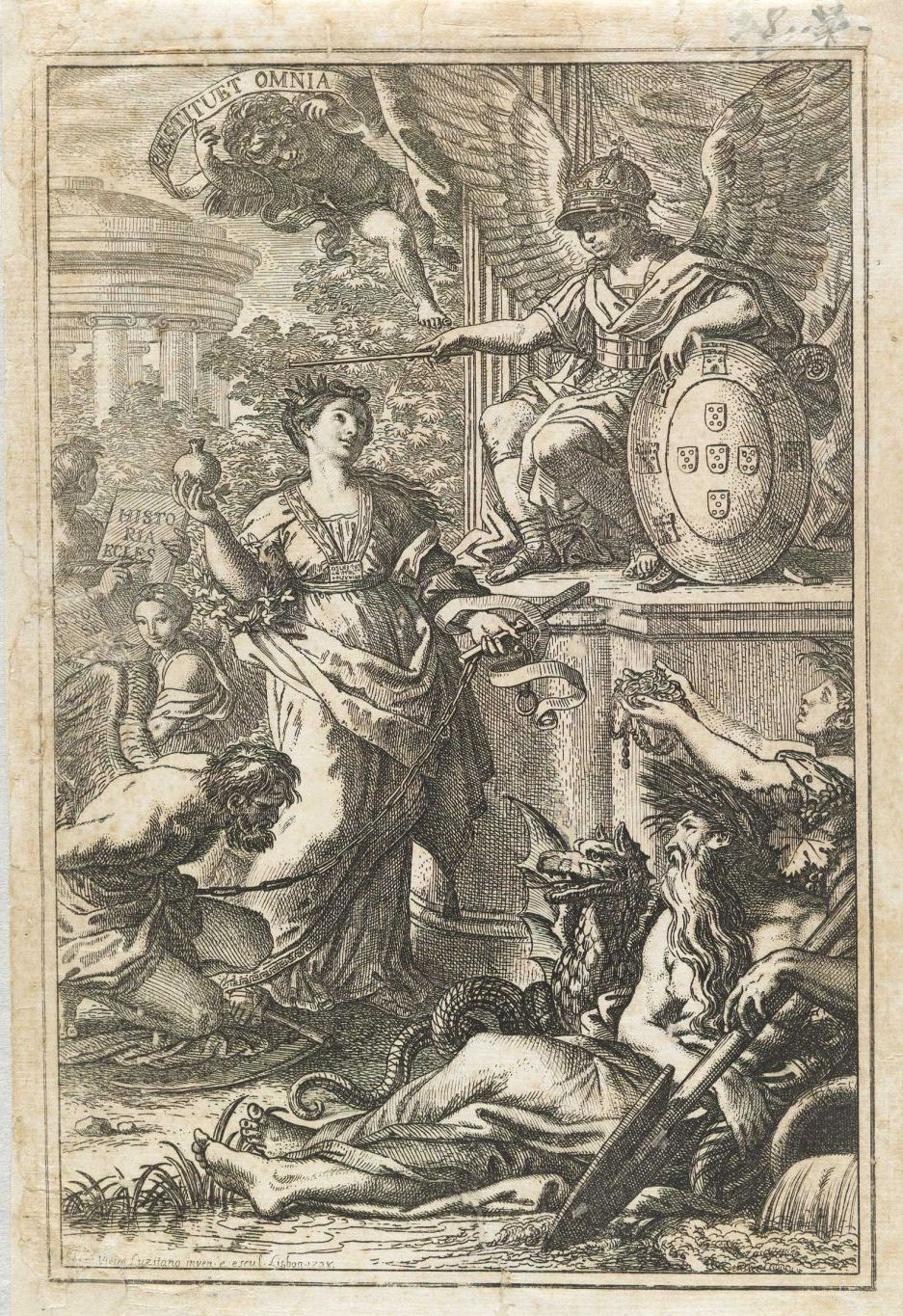
Allegory of the Portuguese shield (1728) by Vieira Lusitano.

The Baroque style underwent a significant shift, giving rise to what is now called Pombaline Baroque (named after the Marquis of Pombal). While Italian, particularly Roman, influences remained strong within the royal court, which was now more conservative, the style evolved with more simplified and restrained features, though it retained a monumental and grandiloquent character. Artists like Vieira Lusitano and Miguel António do Amaral (known for his collection of portraits of Portuguese royalty) exemplify this phase.

In northern Portugal, however, French-inspired Rococo began to emerge, blending gradually with the late Baroque. This new style introduced lighter, more decorative, and graceful elements, incorporating classicist references and adapting its themes to suit the spaces it adorned. Vieira Portuense, Jean-Baptiste Pillement and Pedro Alexandrino de Carvalho are notable figures representing this new approach.

Portuense (1765-1805) learnt to paint from his father, a landscape painter, and from João Glama Ströberle (1708-1792) and Pillement. He then studied in Lisbon and later in Rome, and travelled through Italy, Germany, Austria and England before returning to Portugal in 1800. In Rome, he studied under Domenico Corvi (1721-1803). His works are represented in the National Museum of Ancient Art in Lisbon and the Soares dos Reis National Museum in Porto. The list of his works includes Leda and the Swan, Allegory of Painting, Filipa de Vilhena knighting her sons and Inês de Castro's Supplication. The MNAA has recently (2023) acquired two paintings inspired by the great Luís de Camões's poem Os Lusíadas, Vasco da Gama before the Samorin of Calicut (Canto VII) and O Banquete na Ilha dos Amores (Banquet on the Isle of Loves, Canto IX and X).

Pedro Alexandrino de Carvalho (1729–1810) was a leading figure in Portuguese art during the latter half of the 18th century, heavily influenced by the artistic traditions of the earlier part of the century. Having failed to secure funding for a study trip to Rome, he trained under João Mesquita, Bernardo Pereira Pegado, and maintained connections with André Gonçalves. His exposure to the Italian Baroque, particularly the Roman school, shaped his early work, which later transitioned to the French Rococo style, of which he became one of Portugal's foremost practitioners. Some of his later paintings are in the Neoclassical style. Carvalho worked in several of the churches in the Lisbon region that were rebuilt after the 1755 earthquake and played a vital role in artist training and advocacy. He reorganized the Guild of Saint Luke and, in 1785, was appointed director of the Academy of the Nude (Academia do Nu) by Pina Manique. His prolific output — over 400 known works (list here) (not counting the drawings.)— reflects the efficiency of his workshop and his strong leadership, though some disparities in quality suggest delegation within his studio.

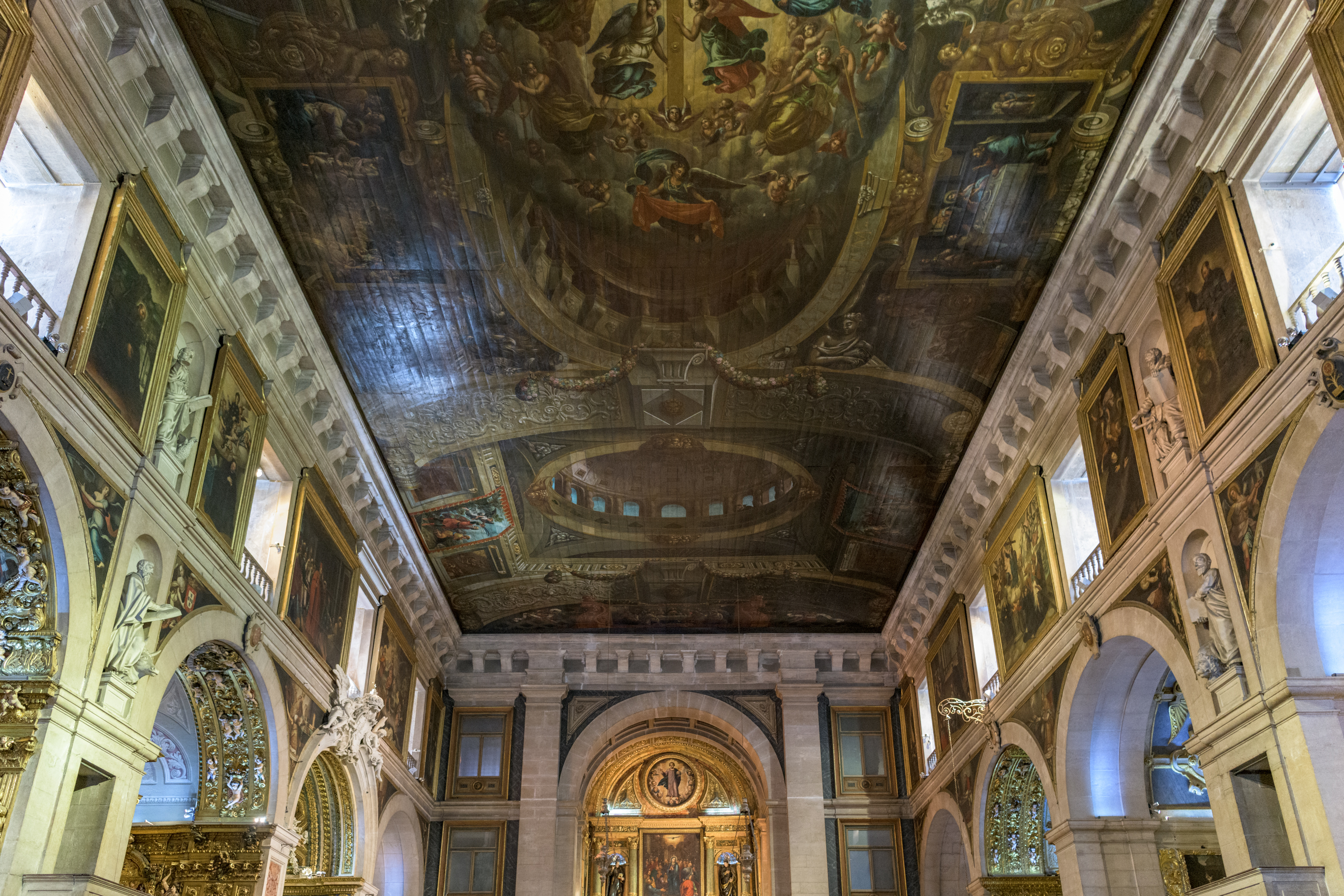
Igreja de São Roque in Lisbon.

Joaquim Manuel da Rocha (1727-1786) painted a very Christ-like Sao Sebastiao (Igreja de São Roque, Lisbon). His work is still largely uncatalogued.

It was a time of aristocratic literary salons where a society of gallant, hedonistic and sophisticated habits coexisted, formed by the nobility and an enriched bourgeoisie, where women took on a prominent role and religion lost its ideological power. France had become the country to which artists looked for inspiration.

Religious painting during the Rococo period underwent a transformation as it adapted to the growing emphasis on pleasure and happiness. While traditional religious art catered to the devout lower classes, it struggled to incorporate the Rococo ideals of sensual enjoyment of elite society. Christian moralists resolved this by linking human pleasure with virtue, suggesting that earthly happiness was a gift from God. This shift imbued religious imagery with an optimistic tone, replacing guilt and fear with a sense of joy and hope. Consequently, religious paintings became more celebratory, offering believers a bridge between earthly and divine happiness for the faithful.

=== Neoclassicism and Romanticism ===
Queluz Palace.

The end of the 18th century saw Rococo, finally triumphant, rapidly move towards greater simplification and the purging of its decorative excesses in the direction of Neoclassicism, due to the great interest in the art and culture of Antiquity that was rife throughout Europe at this time. The construction of the Palace of Queluz began in 1748, while that of the Estrela Basilica (designed by Mateus Vicente de Oliveira and Reinaldo Manuel dos Santos) spanned from 1779 to 1789. The building features characteristics of the late Baroque and Neoclassical styles. The construction of the Teatro Nacional de São Carlos, designed by José da Costa e Silva, with ceilings by Manuel da Costa and Cirilo Volkmar Machado, started in 1792. (The Café A Brasileira where intellectuals later met, is very close to the theatre). By 1802, Neoclassical influence extended to the Palácio Nacional da Ajuda, designed by Costa e Silva and Francisco Xavier Fabri. Machado also contributed to the palace's decoration during the 1810s and early 1820s.

Portuguese artists were deeply influenced by the powerful ideas that were reshaping Europe and the Americas, but as the 19th century dawned, Portugal faced a period of profound instability marked by a series of tumultuous events. In 1807, the royal family fled to Brazil following the Napoleonic invasion during the Peninsular War, leading to British military and political dominance over Portugal (1808–1821). Insurrections erupted in Porto and Lisbon in 1820, prompting the royal family's return in 1821. Lisbon regained its status as the capital after Brazil declared independence in 1822, which resulted in the loss of Portugal's colonial trade. Shortly thereafter, an absolutist counter-revolution triggered the Liberal Wars (1828–1834). This caused a relative paralysis in the arts and a temporary weakening of French influence, favouring romantic expressions but not cancelling out classicist ones.

Portuguese Classicism emerged in the last quarter of the 18th century as part of a broader European cultural transformation during the Enlightenment. Archaeological discoveries and literary studies unveiled classical art and ideas, inspiring widespread enthusiasm. Engravings of ancient ruins reached audiences beyond scholars, fostering appreciation for order, balance, and civility. This ideological shift repudiated Rococo's sensuality, prioritizing rationality and ethics. Art education became structured through Academies, reflecting these values. Classicism, deeply tied to progress and civilisation, embodied the era's commitment to cultural refinement and societal advancement.

Around the same time, Romanticism began to flourish in Germany and England, introducing a new approach to nature and emphasizing the expression of emotions and individual creativity. This movement became a powerful vehicle for revolutionary ideologies, challenging established power structures, including the Church and the State. It also fuelled nationalist movements across various nations, fostering a renewed appreciation for the Middle Ages, which had previously been dismissed with disdain, and reconstructing ancestral histories often obscured or forgotten in recorded narratives.

The period spanning the late 18th century to the mid-19th century in Portuguese art is marked by a dynamic interplay between Classicism and Romanticism. Though often seen as antagonistic, these movements share a foundation in idealism and a commitment to reform. Together, they contributed to shaping a unified vision of art and culture, elevating the artist to a new role as both a prophet of a more socially just era and an educator of the public, guiding society toward a purer, truer, and more universally beneficial morality.

In this cultural landscape, distinguishing between Portuguese Neoclassical and Romantic paintings can often be challenging, as both schools coexisted until around the 1850s, with Romanticism persisting slightly longer. However, broadly speaking, Neoclassical works tend to be marked by clear organization and balance, a preference for line over colour, and a focus on themes from the Greco-Roman tradition, conveyed with an impersonal and restrained tone. Romanticism, by contrast, embraces disorder, striking contrasts, dramatic intensity, and the primacy of colour with expressive brushstrokes. Its subjects often draw from contemporary history, portrayals of people and nature, and universal themes explored through highly individual and emotional interpretations.

Neoclassicism played a key role in shaping academic art inspired by classical antiquity and laid the groundwork for exploring the nude as a subject, previously marginalized due to Catholic moral opposition.

Among the most important neoclassical painters were Vieira Portuense in his last phase, Domingos Sequeira, José da Cunha Taborda, Cirilo Volkmar Machado, Norberto José Ribeiro (who also taught at the Lisbon School of Fine Arts), António Manuel da Fonseca and the Viscount de Meneses, a late representative, who was taught by António Manuel da Fonseca and then by Johann Friedrich Overbeck when he was in Italy.

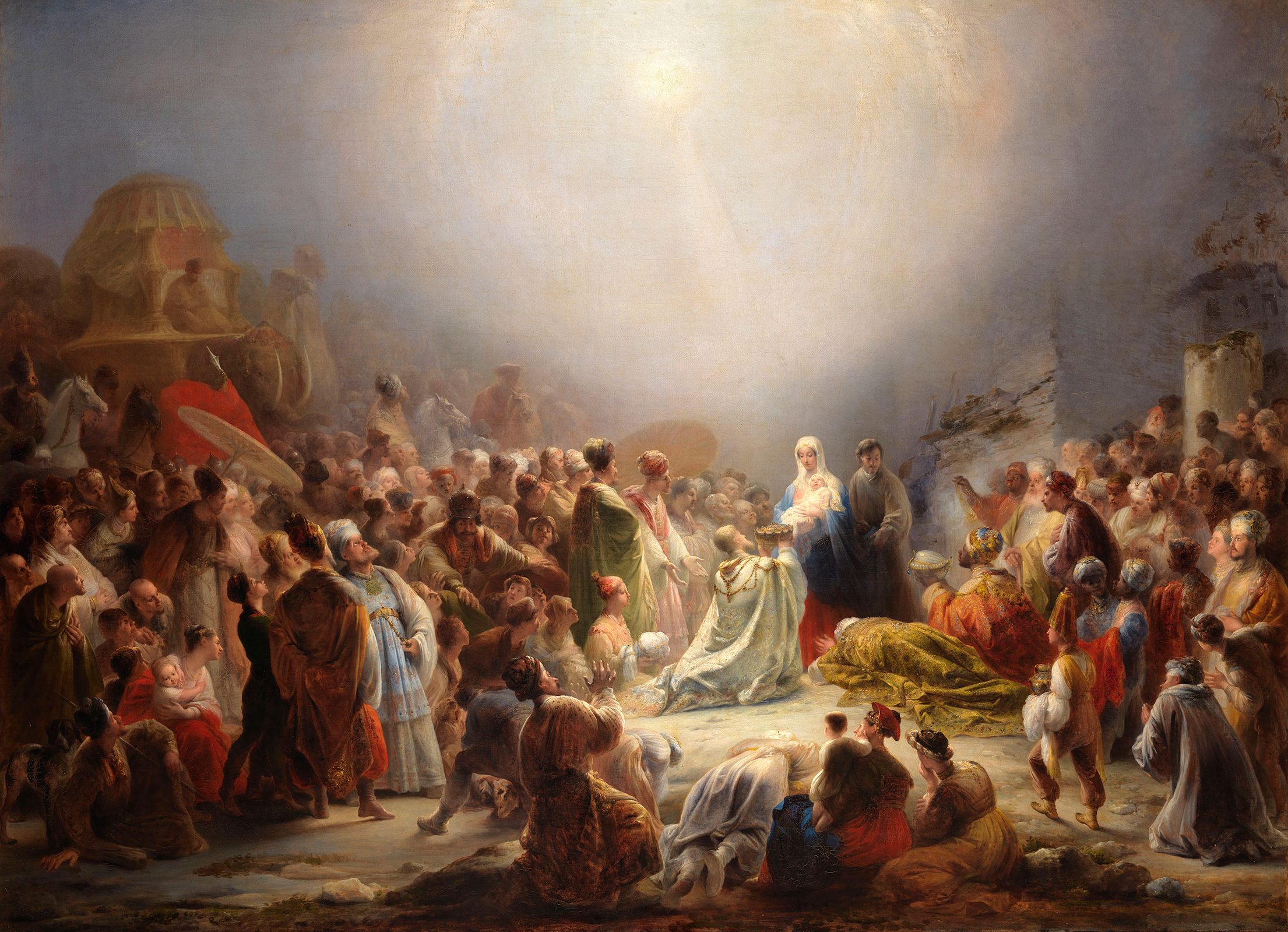
The Adoration of the Magi (1828) by Domingos Sequeira.

Domingos Sequeira (1768-1837) was sent to Rome to study at the Portuguese Academy under Antonio Cavallucci, and then taught at the Accademia di San Luca before returning to Lisbon in 1795. Appointed court painter in 1802 he worked at the Palace of Ajuda, and was exposed to the political upheavals of the time - he was, successively, a supporter of the French invading army (Junot Protecting the City of Lisbon, 1808), of the English alliance (Wellington's Apotheosis, 1811), of the Liberal revolution (Portraits of 33 deputies, 1821) and of the Constitutional Charter (D. Pedro IV and Maria II, 1825). He went into exile in France after the Vilafrancada and exhibited a now lost A Morte de Camões at the Salon du Louvre, a work that earned him a gold medal and a place among the most representative Romantic painters, alongside Eugène Delacroix. He finally settled in Rome in 1826, where he dedicated himself to religious painting. Sequeira may have been the most important painter of late 18th century Portugal (with Portuense). His style was somewhere between neoclassicism and romanticism. One of his first important paintings (list here) is a history painting, The Miracle of Ourique (now in the Château d'Eu, a former residence of the Brazilian imperial family). He was also a portrait painter (Ritratto di Joaquim Pedro Quintella, futuro conte di Farrobo, 1813 (Louvre: Allégorie de la fondation de la Casa Pia de Belem. His Mourning of Christ of 1827 will soon be deposited in a museum in Portugal. He also used black stone and white chalk in one version of his 1828 Adoration of the Magi (MNAA), for example. Soup Kitchen in Arroios, an etching, was selected as one of the ten most important artistic works in Portugal by the Europeana project.

The Lisbon School of Fine Arts was founded in 1836, and soon intellectuals interested in romanticism such as Almeida Garrett and Alexandre Herculano introduced a taste for ancient history and its material evidence, sparking a national debate. Figures like the Polish count and diplomat Atanazy Raczyński, delved into the study of ancient Portuguese art and encouraged the reconstruction of historical figures' biographies, producing the most important body of artistic historiography of the period in Portugal. These efforts driven by Portugal's long period of instability and the search for new values and a sense of identity through a focus on its history began to materialize in the work of the art historian Joaquim de Vasconcelos and the archaeologist Joaquim Possidónio Narciso da Silva.

Between 1840 and 1860, Portuguese painting was characterized predominantly by Romanticism, reflecting an active pursuit of national identity. Artists of this period sought to glorify national heroes, idealize the common populace through poetic and sentimental portrayals, and depict local landscapes imbued with nostalgic and bucolic qualities. Additionally, a rising interest in the exotic became evident, manifested in the adoption of orientalist and medievalist themes. By the 1870s, Romanticism's influence waned, though a core of resistance persisted in Porto, notably in the work of Francisco José Resende. Alongside Neoclassicism and the strengthening of academic teaching, Romanticism in Portugal shifted artistic focus from religious themes to secular subjects.

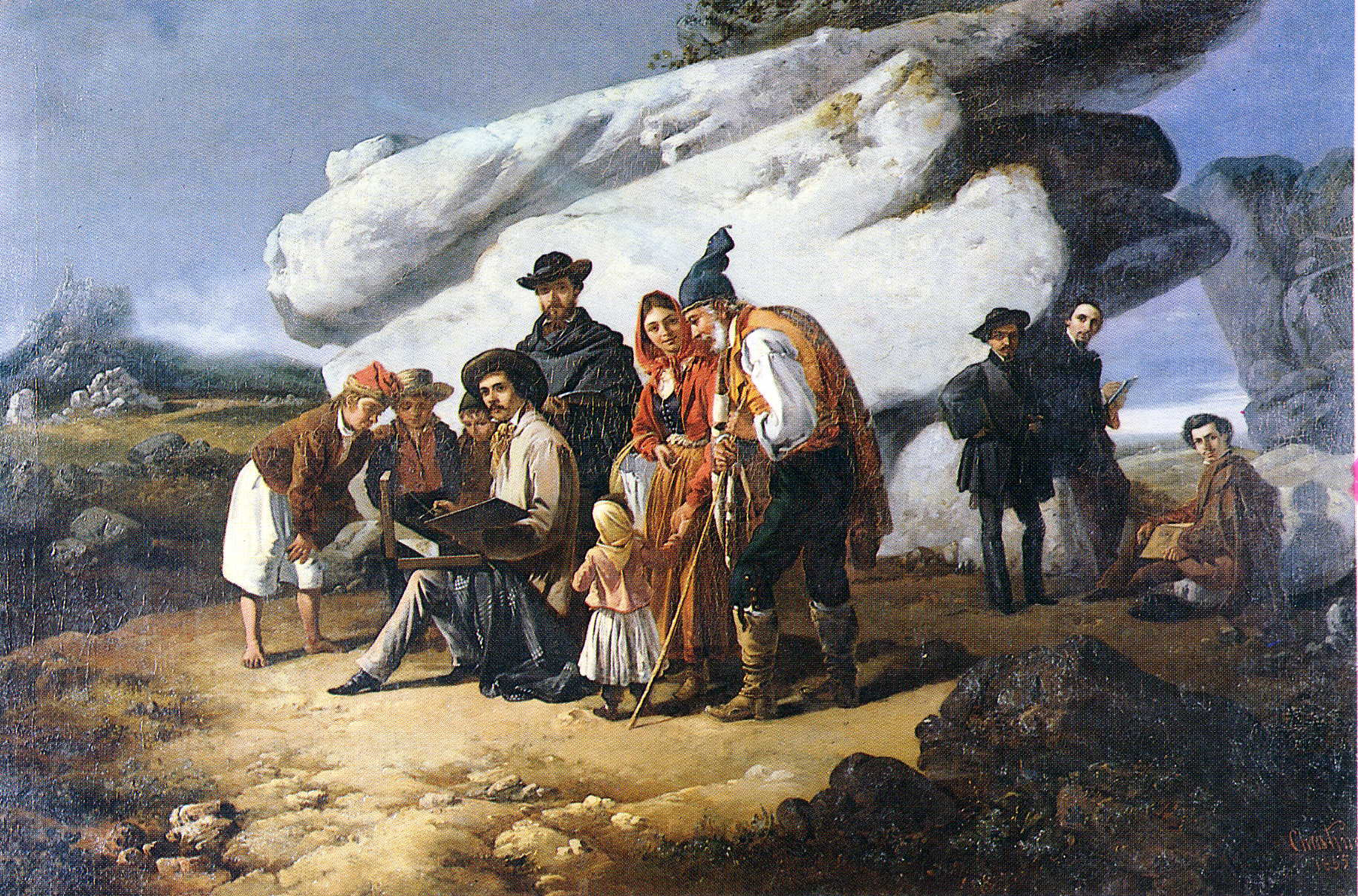
Five Artists in Sintra (1850s) by João Cristino da Silva.

The role of King Ferdinand II of Portugal in the Portuguese arts during this period is also noteworthy. Educated in Austria, he embodied the Romantic ideal par excellence. His patronage provided cultural stability in a century marked by chronic political unrest. The Romantic movement in Portugal included artists such as Tomás José D'Anunciação and his friend João Cristino da Silva, both landscape painters, João António Correia, Auguste Roquemont, João Cristino da Silva, Miguel Ângelo Lupi, José Rodrigues and Joaquim Rodrigues Braga as well as Francisco Augusto Metrass (histoire).

At 16, Francisco José Resende joined the Academia Portuense de Belas-Artes, studying Drawing (1841-1845) and Historical Painting (1845-1849), under painters Tadeu Maria de Almeida Furtado and Joaquim Rodrigues Braga. He and Camilo Castelo Branco were close friends. In 1848 he met Swiss-Portuguese painter Augusto Roquemont and became his favourite disciple. After painting a few theater sets, he focused on capturing rural life, trades, and regional costumes, depicting fishermen, farmers, and peasants. Though disliking portraits, he painted commissions for figures like the Viscount of Seabra. He started teaching Historical Painting and Living Model classes at the Academia Portuense de Belas-Artes.

In 1853, he traveled to Paris, studying under Adolphe Yvon and copying numerous paintings at the Louvre Museum. He was particularly inspired by Peter Paul Rubens, began experimenting with new techniques and he later travelled to London, married Caroline Wilson, and had a daughter, Clara de Resende, born in Paris in 1855, who also became a painter. Returning to Portugal in 1855, he settled in Lisbon in 1858, painting portraits of Ferdinand II of Portugal and his successor Pedro V of Portugal, and a self-portrait (1860) now in the Soares dos Reis National Museum (List of his paintings). He exhibited Camões salvando “Os Lusíadas” at the Paris Universal Exhibition (1867), exhibited at the Madrid Fine Arts Exhibition, the London Universal Exhibition (1872), and again at the Paris Universal Exhibition (1878, 1889). He sold paintings to aid fishermen and families affected by the Teatro Baquet tragedy. He also portrayed European royals and notable figures like Umberto I, Kings Luís I and Carlos I, the businesswoman Antonia Ferreira, the composer Antonio Soller, the photographer Carlos Relvas, the French chemist Louis Pasteur.

Auguste Roquemont (1804-1852), the natural son of Prince Friedrich von Hessen-Darmstadt, studied in Paris at a boarding school from the age of 8 and then carried out his artistic training in Rome, Bologna, Florence and Venice. He settled in Guimarães, in the north of Portugal, in 1828 and later in Porto where he exhibited paintings of scenes of everyday life in 1932, to much applause. He had many pupils, apart from Resende, including João António Correia and his brother Guilherme António Correia.

In addition to his oil portraits (List here) of the northern nobility (including the Baronesa de Seixo in the Museu Nacional de Soares dos Reis) and upper bourgeoisie, as well as depictions of popular customs, he also created works in pencil, charcoal, and stump, along with miniature portraits that strongly influenced the Romantic painters of Porto. His works can be viewed in the Soares dos Reis National Museum in Porto, the Grão Vasco National Museum in Viseu, and the Casa-Museu Dr. Anastácio Gonçalves in Lisbon.

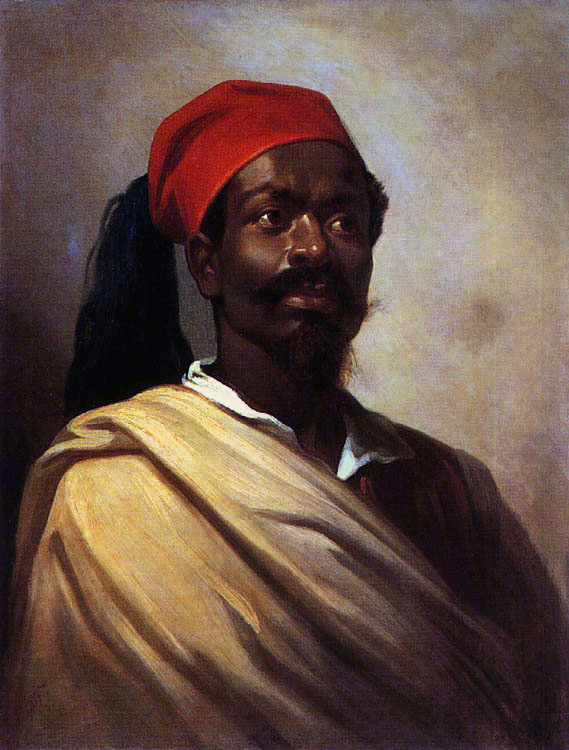
The Negro (1869) by João António Correia.

João António Correia began studying drawing in Porto in 1836. He was initially a voluntary student at the Escola Superior de Belas-Artes do Porto (APBA). Later, he went to Paris, where he met the painter Théodore Chassériau (1819–1856), who helped him gain admission to the Imperial Academy of Fine Arts in Paris. There, he was exposed to artistic movements that profoundly influenced his work, such as classicism, naturalism, and romanticism. Upon returning to Portugal in 1851, he began teaching at the APBA, eventually becoming its director from 1882 until his death in 1896. A master of religious painting, Correia also produced royal portraits, including those of Maria II and Luís I for the Palácio da Bolsa. He created self-portraits exhibited at the APBA triennials, one dated 1848 and another 1863. In 1863, he contributed to the set designs for the royal entry into Oporto of King Luís I and Queen Maria Pia. Correia employed the technique of lithography to depict notable figures and even lithographed his own works, such as the portrait of the musician Francisco Eduardo da Costa (1818–1855). He also produced historical paintings, such as Rainha Santa distribuindo esmolas aos pobres (The Holy Queen Distributing Alms to the Poor, 1877, Soares dos Reis National Museum), which reflects a recurring theme in his career, and Auto de Fé (1869, in the same museum). His most celebrated painting is undoubtedly O Negro (1869), housed in the Soares dos Reis National Museum. This canvas stands out not only for its then-exotic subject but also for its exuberant execution. Correia was also a teacher of several notable artists, including António Soares dos Reis, João Marques de Oliveira, Silva Porto, Henrique Pousão, and Artur Loureiro.

=== Naturalism ===
The last three decades of the 19th century marked a period of rapid aesthetic transformation in Portugal, driven by efforts to redefine the nation's artistic, cultural, and identity frameworks. This era saw the establishment of the Sociedade Promotora das Belas-Artes (Society for the Promotion of Fine Arts) in Lisbon, which advocated for more progressive art forms. Influential figures such as critics Latino Coelho, Ramalho Ortigão, poet Antero de Quental, and writer Manuel Pinheiro Chagas contributed significantly. A group of young revolutionaries from Coimbra, known as the Geração de 70 (70s Generation), emerged as pivotal proponents of Realism. Their efforts initiated a profound critique of Portugal's prevailing political and economic structures, the academic art endorsed by institutional authorities, and the now-outdated Romantic sensibilities. The movement faced fierce resistance from the authorities, particularly during the episode of the Casino Conferences of 1871. These gatherings were perceived by the regime as a direct threat to societal stability and were swiftly suppressed.

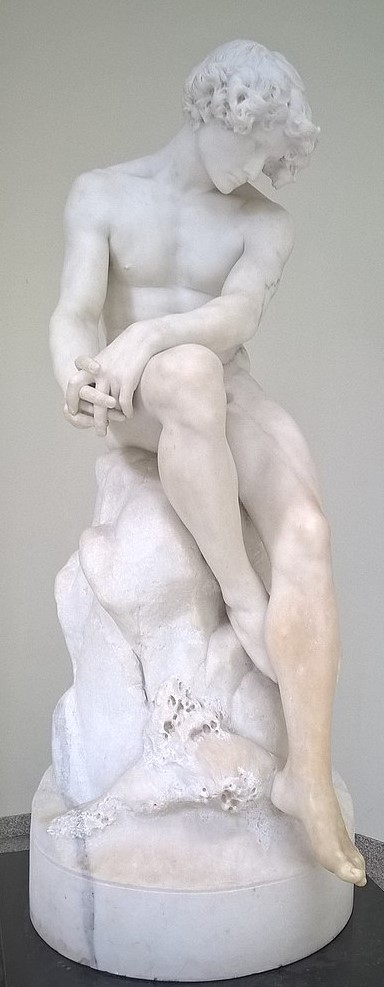
The Exiled (1874) by António Soares dos Reis.

Italian art began to lose its appeal, although Rome remained an important centre of learning. Meanwhile, French influence grew increasingly strong, attracting many aspiring artists to Paris for their studies. There, they encountered the innovative trends of the lyrical landscapes championed by the Barbizon School, as well as the works of Courbet, Daubigny, Degas, and Manet. Upon returning to Portugal, these artists brought with them a wave of fresh ideas, breaking the relative isolationism that had previously prevailed. This isolation had only been sporadically interrupted by scholarship artists returning with foreign influences or by the visits of occasional international figures. This new art movement was fundamentally bourgeois in nature, opposing the privileges of the elites and exploring novel technical approaches. It embraced a freer, more fluid style of painting that distanced itself from the rigid academic standards and their focus on heroic or mythological themes, which had little connection to contemporary realities. Instead, there was a burgeoning interest in creating socially conscious art. The painters of this movement sought a more objective depiction of the world, prioritizing authenticity over the pursuit of idealized beauty. They turned their attention to everyday life, portraying the realities of ordinary people in its diverse aspects. Outdoor landscape painting became a prominent practice, shedding the idealistic aura of Romanticism. Among the pioneering artists of this new direction were António da Silva Porto, Marques de Oliveira, Henrique Pousão, José Júlio de Souza Pinto, and Artur Loureiro.

In the following decade, Portuguese painting increasingly embraced Naturalism, which extended its influence to the Royal Academy of Fine Arts. There, Silva Porto, a former pupil of Daubigny, played a pivotal role as a teacher, inspiring a new generation of artists. This group of enthusiasts often gathered informally at the Cervejaria Leão de Ouro (Golden Lion Brewery, in Lisbon), earning them the moniker Grupo do Leão (Lion Group). Among its notable members were João Vaz, Ramalho Júnior, Cipriano Martins, Columbano Bordalo Pinheiro (with his psychologically profound portraits, particularly of intellectuals such as Antero de Quental or Os Presidentes), his brother Rafael Bordalo Pinheiro (creator of the popular cartoon character Zé Povinho, 1875), J. Rodrigues Vieira, Henrique Pinto, Moura Girão, João Ribeiro Cristino da Silva, and José Malhoa (with his scenes of rural life and traditional customs very popular with the bourgeoisie, many of them in the José Malhoa Museum, in Caldas da Rainha). This was at a time when "Saudade" (combining a sense of longing, loss, absence, and deep affection) inspired a statue, O Desterrado (The Outcast, Rome, 1870), "uma «estátua da saudade»", by António Soares dos Reis as well as a painting by Almeida Júnior (Saudade, 1899). The Lion Group played a crucial role in the revitalization of Portuguese painting, even securing royal patronage despite a lack of consensus among its members on specific artistic approaches. To varying degrees, their works blended Realism's objectivity and sense of social commitment with elements of Impressionist technique, including its emphasis on the autonomy of the artwork. This synthesis coalesced around a core of spontaneous Naturalism, establishing a style that left a lasting imprint on Portuguese art.

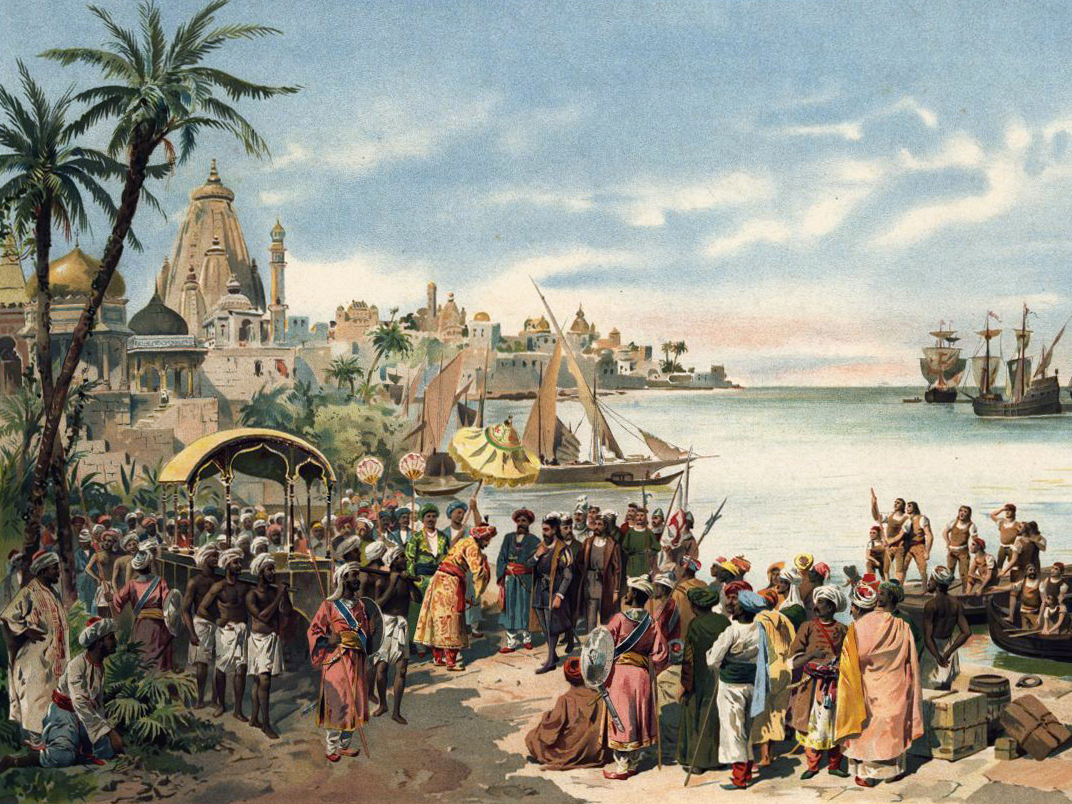
Vasco da Gama's arrival in Calicut in 1498 (1900s) by Alfredo Roque Gameiro.

This eclectic movement remained one of the most influential forces in Portuguese painting until the mid-20th century. Despite increasing competition from the modernist schools that began to enrich the local art scene in the 1920s, Naturalism retained a significant presence. Even King Carlos I embraced Naturalist themes in parts of his artistic work. Other notable contributors to this tradition included Luciano Freire, José Veloso Salgado, Alfredo Keil (A Carta), and Alfredo Roque Gameiro. A particularly dynamic figure of the era was Carlos Reis, who played a pivotal role as a teacher at the Academy and as an organizer of artistic initiatives. Reis was instrumental in the creation of several organizations aimed at promoting the arts, such as the Silva Porto Society, the "Grupo Ar Livre" (Free Air Group), and the National Society of Fine Arts, of which he was a co-founder. He was the one who publicly acknowledged Silva Porto's pioneering role in shaping a new artistic language in Portugal, saying:

"Which of my fellow students could forget those artistic excursions on warm summer afternoons, when we would follow our beloved master, tirelessly carrying the heavy luggage of a landscape painter on his bare shoulders, as we followed shortcuts lined with holm oaks, searching for a motif that would capture his artist's soul and resonate in perfect harmony with his temperament as a colorist?

"And then, as we formed a circle around the master, our eyes fixed on the boards he loved so dearly, we would witness a true marvel: from that simple piece of wood emerged golden fields, bathed in the relentless July sun, with holm oaks framed by agaves so characteristic of Lisbon's outskirts, everything was so vivid, so unpretentious, so imbued with truth and emotion, that one might say the master was not painting with the hues of his irreplaceable palette, but with light itself—light that seemed to flow directly from his work. For all his art was light. And it was this light that, through his inspiration, guided our first steps as artists; it is this light that continues to illuminate us today; and it is this light that shines like the brightest star in the constellation of Portuguese art!"

António Ramalho studied at the Royal Academy of Fine Arts, where he was encouraged by António da Silva Porto to pursue a career as a painter. In 1880, he co-organized a successful exhibition with Columbano Bordalo Pinheiro. Two years later, in 1882, he was awarded a scholarship to study in Paris, where he stayed for two years. During this time, he worked under Alexandre Cabanel, focusing on genre painting, portraiture, and plein air techniques. One of his notable works from this period, Chez mon voisin (or O Lanterneiro, The Lantern Maker), was exhibited at the 1883 Paris Salon and later sent to Lisbon as a requirement of his scholarship. He exhibited again at the Salon in 1885. After returning to Portugal in 1884, Ramalho reconnected with his comrades from the Grupo do Leão, with whom he had previously participated in the first Exhibition of Modern Paintings in 1881. Ramalho also contributed to the decoration of numerous public and private buildings, leaving a lasting mark on Portuguese art through his diverse body of work. (List of his paintings).

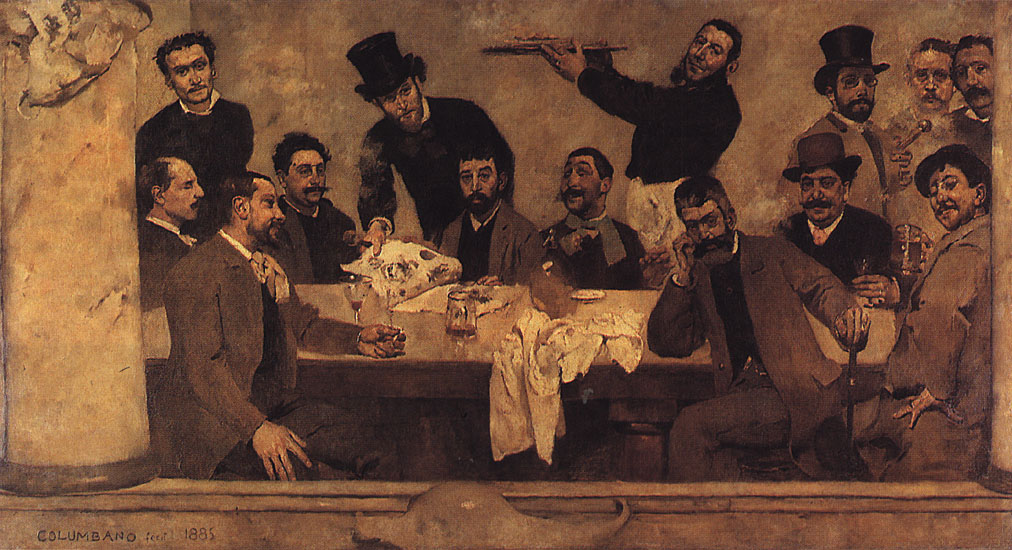
The Grupo do Leão

João Rodrigues Vieira studied painting and sculpture at the Academy of Fine Arts under Victor Bastos, Tomás da Anunciação, and Célestin Anatole Calmels. A founding member of the Grupo do Leão (Lion Group), he was immortalized in Columbano Bordalo Pinheiro's famous painting The Lion Group, which depicts the artists and writers who gathered at the Leão de Ouro brewery; Vieira is portrayed seated at the far right, with one hand on his waist. In 1878, he competed at the Universal Exhibition in Paris, presenting a bust titled Flora. He actively participated in the group's Modern Painting Exhibitions, starting in 1881, showcasing delicate landscapes, still lifes, and flowers painted with remarkable freshness. Notable works include No Fim do Mercado (At the End of the Market in Leiria), Auxilião de Pesca (Fishing assistant), Praia da Nazaré (Nazaré Beach, Palácio Nacional da Ajuda). By 1887, he had moved to Coimbra to teach drawing at the University, where he also incorporated local themes into his art. His acclaimed work A Orquídea stands out. He stopped exhibiting after 1893, the year Silva Porto died.

Henrique Pinto (Cacilhas, 1852 – Figueiró dos Vinhos, 1912) was a member of the "Grupo do Leão" from its inception. Together with José Malhoa and the sculptor José Simões de Almeida (known as "Tio," or uncle), he discovered Figueiró dos Vinhos, a small town that was to inspire many painters and other artists. Their collaboration fostered the spirit of the "Naturalist School of Figueiró," characterized by its emphasis on rural and sentimental landscape themes. O Fado, José Malhoa's most famous painting, was created in Figueiró. Pinto studied at the Lisbon Academy, where he was mentored by Joaquim Gregório Prieto (1833–1907), Tomás José da Anunciação (1818–1879), and José Simões de Almeida Júnior (nicknamed "Sobrinho," or nephew). He first exhibited his work in 1874 and made unsuccessful attempts to secure a grant to study abroad in 1874 and 1875. Pinto participated in all of the Grupo do Leão's Modern Paintings (1881 to 1888/89). In 1885, he was portrayed in Columbano Bordalo Pinheiro's Grupo do Leão, standing in the back row on the far right, between Malhoa and Vaz. His painting A Caça aos Taralhões (The Hunting of the Taralhões), purchased by King Carlos in 1891, was later showcased at the Berlin International Exhibition (1896). At the Universal Exhibition in Paris (1900), Pinto exhibited A Ceia (The Supper), which disappeared in a shipwreck during its return journey. List of his paintings.

José de Sousa Moura Girão was born in Lisbon in August 1840. He studied under Tomás da Anunciação and Miguel Ângelo Lupi at the Academy of Fine Arts, where he specialized in animal painting, focusing primarily on depictions of poultry. He served as a restorer at the National Museum of Ancient Art for 36 years. As a member of the Grupo do Leão, he was immortalized in Columbano Bordalo Pinheiro's painting of the group. Moura Girão's painting Viva a República (1910) captures the spirit of the Republican Revolution: it features a rooster crowing to herald the dawn of a new era, symbolizing the arrival of the Republic. In the background, an exuberant crowd raises their arms, hats, and flags in celebration, welcoming this transformative moment in Portuguese history.

João Ribeiro Cristino da Silva was the son of João Cristino da Silva and also belonged to the Lion Group.

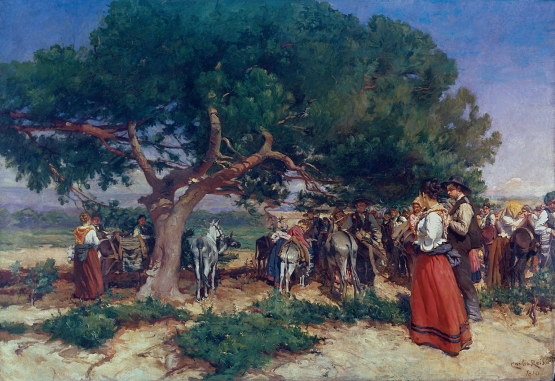
The fair (1910) by Carlos Reis.

Carlos António Rodrigues dos Reis, known as Carlos Reis (Torres Novas, 1863 – Coimbra, 1940), was a prominent figure of the second generation of Portuguese naturalist painters. After studying at the Lisbon Academy of Fine Arts, he was sent to Paris to further his artistic training, returning to Portugal in 1895. Reis gained recognition for his portraits of contemporary royalty and nobility, as well as his evocative depictions of the everyday life of the Portuguese people. His works are celebrated for their remarkable luminosity. In 1910, Reis founded the Ar Livre ("Open Air") group with his students, a collective later renamed Silva Porto in honour of José Júlio de Sousa Pinto. This group sought to preserve and advance the naturalist aesthetic into the early decades of the 20th century. Reis served as a professor at the Lisbon School of Fine Arts and was appointed director of the National Museum of Contemporary Art in Lisbon in 1911, a position he held until 1914. He discovered the Serra da Lousã mountains in central Portugal, where he established a studio in 1918. There, he delved deeply into landscape painting, capturing the beauty of the region and its local customs. The Museu Municipal Carlos Reis in Torres Novas was named after him in 1942. (List of his paintings).

==== Decadentism, persistence of Naturalism, and the first Modernism ====
The persistence of Naturalism in 20th-century Portugal stems from complex socio-cultural dynamics. During the 19th century, Portuguese intellectuals grappled unsuccessfully with efforts to uplift national morale. This struggle unfolded amidst a backdrop of national fragility and perceived inferiority on the European stage, exacerbated by dependence on England and stagnation following years of decline. The 1890 British Ultimatum extinguished hopes of revitalizing Portugal through colonial expansion, amplifying a melancholic discontent. Neo-romantic literature, influenced by Almeida Garrett, romanticized the nation's past glories while underscoring contemporary decay. Many blamed the House of Braganza for this decline, envisioning salvation through its overthrow and a spiritual regeneration rooted in a nostalgic ideal of rural Portugal, symbolizing purity and simplicity. Guerra Junqueiro vividly encapsulated this sentiment in his poetry reflecting on the faded grandeur of the past, now reduced to ruins cloaked in ivy, symbolizing loss, desolation, and the haunting remnants of suffering and destruction.

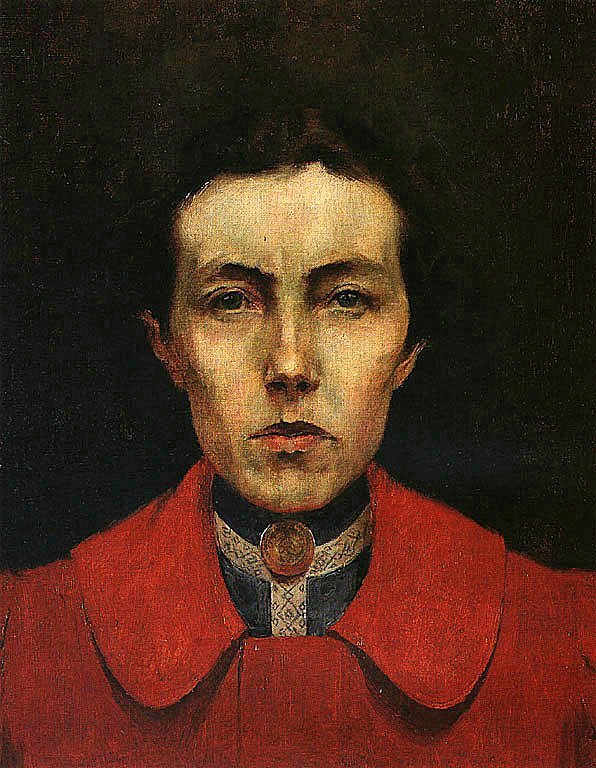
Self-Portrait in a Red Coat (1900s) by Aurélia de Souza.

Sofia Martins de Sousa (1870–1960), a pupil of João Marques de Oliveira, was known for her naturalist style, often interwoven with influences of Realism, Impressionism, and Post-Impressionism. One of her notable works, Interior (Rapariga a fazer bilros: Girl making bobbin lace, Museu Soares dos Reis), depicts a young girl engaged in the traditional art of bobbin lace-making. Aurélia de Souza, particularly well known for her Self-Portrait in a Red Coat was also a student of João Marques de Oliveira.

Meanwhile, the singular work of António Carneiro, also a pupil of João Marques de Oliveira, can be explained only in the context of a decadent environment. Carneiro transformed the naturalist techniques he was taught into more symbolist constructions, emphasizing dreamlike themes and landscapes that transcended the descriptive constraints of naturalism. His work embraced a purely pictorial approach, prioritizing mood and symbolism over strict realism. At the time, the Portuguese public had conservative tastes because of their limited access to avant-garde ideas due to Portugal's peripheral position, insufficient institutional support for artistic renewal, and a turbulent political climate following the rise to power of the Republican movement after the success of the 5 October 1910 Revolution. There are pages on some of his paintings: ''A Vida'' (António Carneiro), 1899-1901 (Fundação Cupertino de Miranda); Minhota (Woman in Minho costume); Camões Lendo «Os Lusíadas» aos Frades de São Domingos (António Carneiro) (Camões Reading "The Lusiads" to the Friars of St Dominic's). He also left a Rembrandtesque Autoretrato.

The new republican government used art for propaganda, promoting nationalist culture, mythologizing progress, and reviving romantic ideals through Naturalism. This style, emphasizing Portuguese landscapes and folklore, persisted longer in Portugal due to longevity of many of the first naturalists, surviving well after it had faded in other countries.

By the 1920s, Naturalism was showing signs of stagnation and the market was beginning to accept more advanced aesthetics based on the work of Almada Negreiros, Carlos Botelho and Guilherme de Santa-Rita. The presence of Robert Delaunay in Spain and Portugal (1914-1920), the influence of writers such as Fernando Pessoa and Mário de Sá-Carneiro, and the bolder approaches of caricaturists also helped pave the way for more daring artistic solutions.

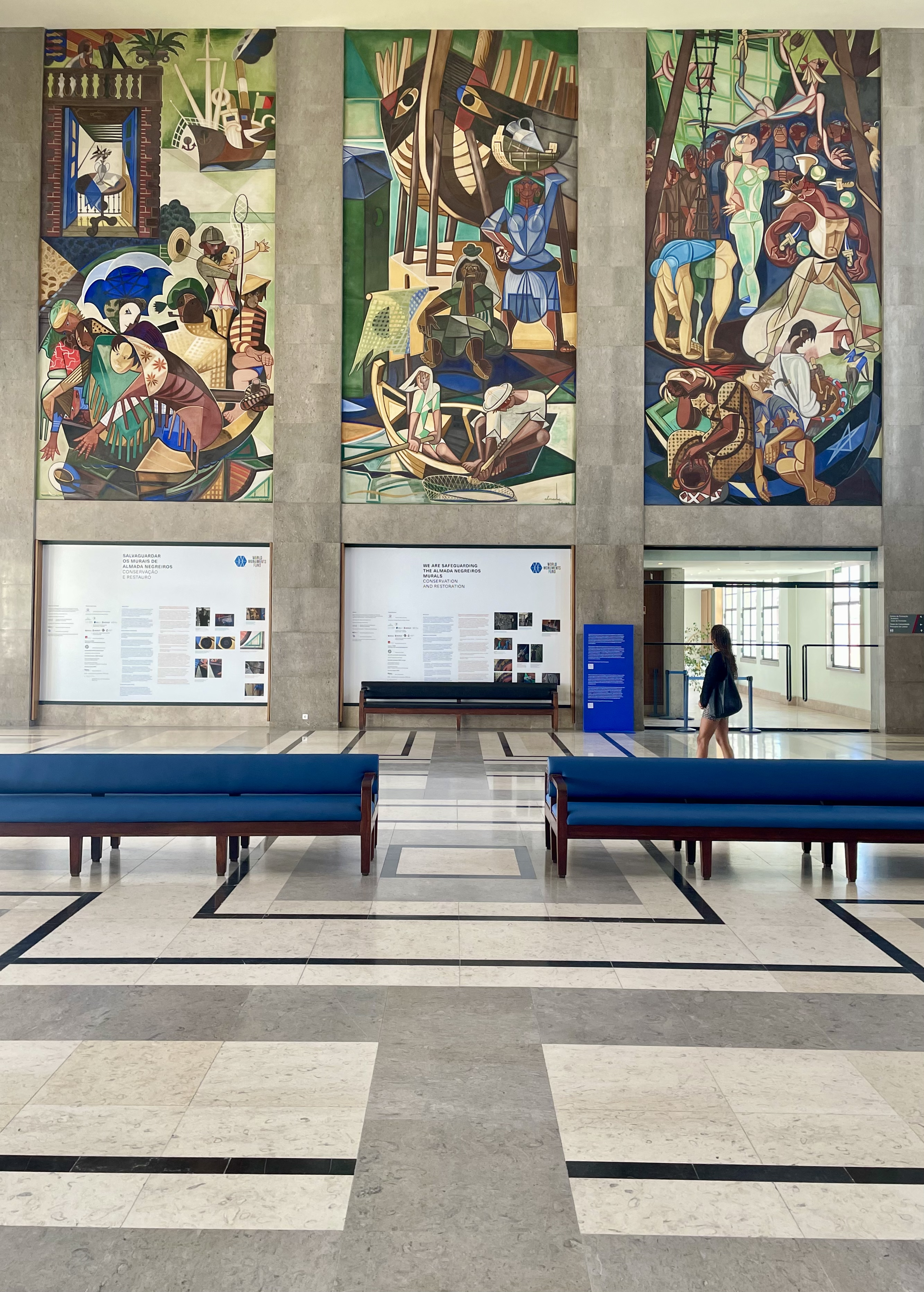
Almada Negreiros's murals at Alcântara Maritime Terminal.

Almada Negreiros stands out as a multifaceted artist and a driving force of modernity in Portuguese art. A friend of the poet Fernando Pessoa, he painted his iconic Retrato de Fernando Pessoa and was profoundly influenced by Cubist and Futurist movements. Negreiros was also the creator of some of the most significant artworks of the first half of the 20th century, including the Alcântara Maritime Terminal and the Rocha Conde de Óbidos Maritime Terminal frescoes. in Lisbon (1945–1949). His explorations culminated in a mythic interpretation of Portuguese culture. This vision is exemplified by his mural Começar (Beginning; 1969, Gulbenkian Foundation, Lisbon).

But the foremost pioneer of Portuguese Modernism in painting was Amadeo de Souza-Cardoso, who immersed himself in the avant-garde scene during his studies in Paris. Profoundly influenced by French artists like Robert and Sonia Delaunay, he explored a variety of modern styles, including Cubism and Purism; Orphism and Dada, with a recurring emphasis on Abstraction. He drew inspiration from the aesthetics of African and Oriental art, creating a body of work that encapsulated the key artistic movements of his era.

In 1915, Souza-Cardoso exhibited over a hundred works in Porto under the title "Abstraccionismo", which met with public hostility and ridicule. However, when showcased in Lisbon, these works received a warmer response, thanks in part to the enthusiastic support of Almada Negreiros and the Orpheu magazine. Among his most renowned works (List here) is Canção Popular – A Russa e o Fígaro (Popular song - the Russian woman and Figaro - the Russian woman is Sonia Delaunay), c.1916., Salto do coelho (The Rabbit's Leap), 1911; and Untitled (Ponte: Bridge), c. 1914. His painting Greyhounds (Souza Cardoso) was selected as one of the ten most important artistic works in Portugal by the Europeana project.

=== Modernismo ===
Main article: Modernismo em Portugal

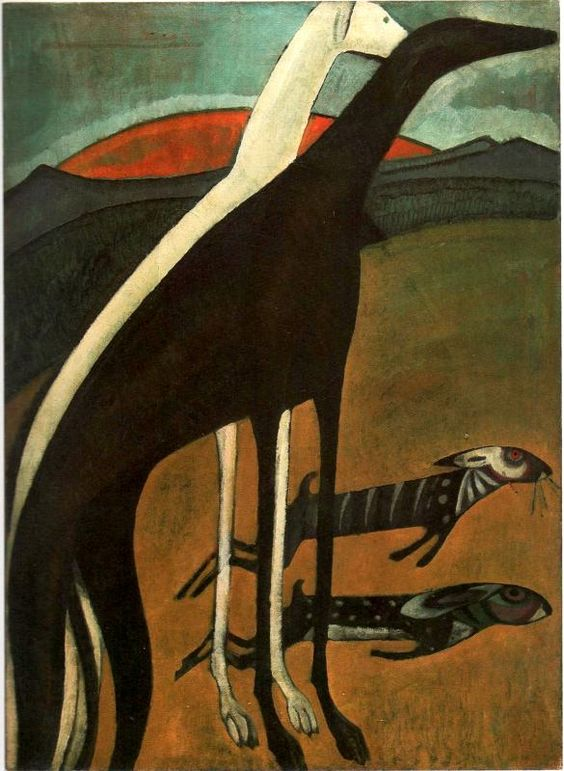
Greyhounds (c. 1911) by Amadeo de Souza-Cardoso.

Portuguese Modernism developed alongside international movements, influenced by rapid advancements in science, technology, and urban transformation. Cities, with their evolving landscapes, played a central role in this shift. As several European monarchies were replaced by republics in the early 20th century, a new vision emerged that abolished aristocratic privileges and emphasized values of merit and social equality. Modernist art, reflecting these changes, rejected traditional representations and embraced a revolutionary character. It focused on urban themes and the autonomy of the artwork, prioritizing visuality and materiality. It also aligned with avant-garde movements such as Cubism, Futurism, and Suprematism, aiming to portray dynamic, cosmopolitan urban environments. As Inês Espada Vieira puts it,

"The men of the avant-garde were the men of scandal, confrontation, and surprise. In their boldness, they found poetry in newspaper headlines and neon signs, discovered landscapes in the layout of letters, and conjured intense scents of tobacco smoke and women's perfume from their paintings. The painters killed the three-dimensionality of the Renaissance canvas, the poets turned the machine into verse, and the writers told of simultaneous movement. They were sincere. When they left the object behind to embrace the idea. Turning towards their inner landscapes, the work—whether written text or painted text—reflected not a world of imitation, but one of creation [...] The city is the birthplace of the avant-garde. There is no other place for modernity. Since Europe first defined itself as such, there have been cities. But the city of modernity is far from the capitals of the Middle Ages, the port cities of the Age of Discovery, and the great capitals of constitutional liberalism. The city of modernity, the stage of the avant-garde, is the product of the Industrial Revolution, the fruit of progress. It is, according to Eduardo Lourenço, the quintessential modern reality. Not just any city, but the Metropolis."

And Paris at that time was the metropolis par excellence, where droves of artists from various countries flocked to learn what it meant to be modern. In the face of political instability and a search for cultural identity, Portugal's modernists looked to Paris for inspiration. But this much sought-after identity could only be discovered through the experience of otherness, creating a tension between nationalism and cosmopolitanism. This quest for identity defined Portuguese Modernism, with figures like Almada Negreiros embracing the experience, highlighting the dynamic between national pride and international influence:

"In Paris, I sought out the avant-garde artists. I became friends with several of them. But, and here's the key point, this interaction with the avant-garde artists in Paris was merely personal friendship. [...] We could never join the avant-garde in the same Ideal. Why? Because our Ideal was not the same. Art cannot exist without the artist's homeland, and I learned this forever abroad. Our homelands were different."

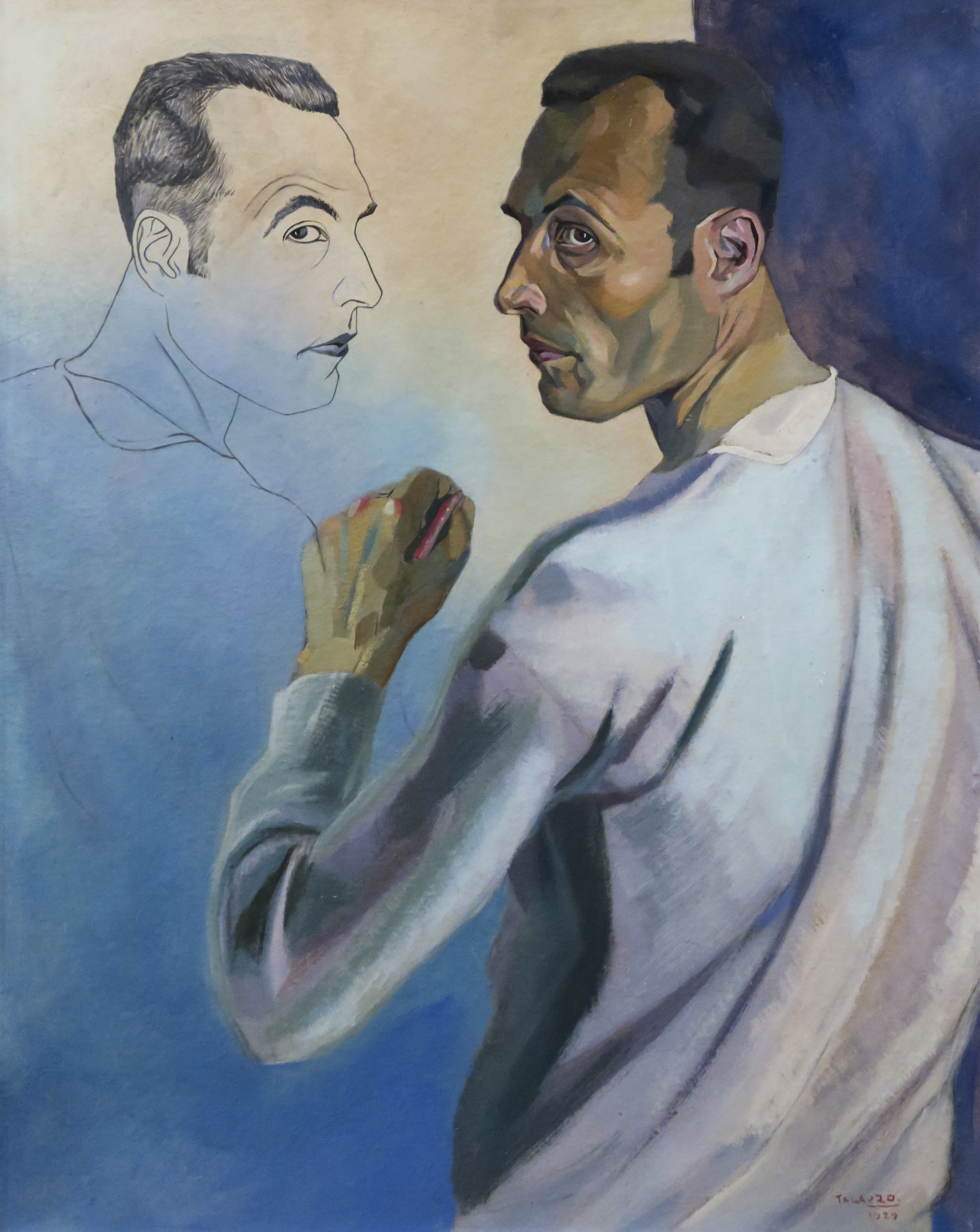
Self-Portrait (1929) by José Tagarro.

José Tagarro was influenced by Fauvism, as well as by Ferdinand Hodler, Columbano, El Greco, and Jean-Auguste-Dominique Ingres. As a portraitist, he created a significant painting of the painter Alfredo Roque Gameiro. His 1929 Autoretrato is in fact a double self-portrait.

The promises raised by the introduction of these new aesthetics were thwarted by the continuation of World War I and the departure of some avant-garde figures from the country, leading to a return of conformism for some time. The cultural policy of the Estado Novo, inaugurated in 1933 with the creation of the Secretariado de Propaganda Nacional and led by António Ferro, marked the end of the naturalist cycle and a definitive victory for Modernism, but now within a powerful nationalist affirmation, strongly influenced by Expressionism. Its principles were based on the proclamation of the exemplary value of History with its gallery of saints and heroes, a fascination with the empire, a constant reiteration of grandeur, and the valorisation of what came from the people. These principles were crystallised in the First Exposição Colonial Portuguesa (1934), the Concurso da Aldeia Mais Portuguesa de Portugal (Most Portuguese Village Competition, 1936), and the Portuguese World Exhibition (1940), symbols of the so-called "Política do Espírito" (Politics of the Spirit), the cultural promotion and propaganda project of the regime.

Abel Manta was a prominent figure in the first generation of Portuguese modernist painters. In 1919, he moved to Paris, where he came into contact with Francisco Franco de Sousa, Dordio Gomes, Luís Cristino da Silva, and João da Silva, with whom he shared a studio. During this time, his exposure to Impressionism and Cézanne proved decisive for his artistic development. Returning to Lisbon in 1925, he taught Decorative Arts at the Technical School in Funchal. In 1927, he married Clementina Carneiro de Moura, and in 1928 their only son, João Abel Manta, was born. Manta frequently participated in gatherings such as those at the Café A Brasileira in Chiado. His work is characterized by a transition from Cézanne-inspired still lifes and Impressionist urban landscapes to expressive and nuanced portraits.

=== Neorealism and the second Modernist generation ===
This nationalist and populist context provided the backdrop for taking advantage of some of the plastic achievements of early Modernism to develop a new, socially oriented figuration—the so-called Portuguese Neorealist movement—which sought to re-establish a direct dialogue with the public after the abstract and somewhat hermetic radicalizations of the Modernists. In 1935, an article by Álvaro Salema entitled "O antiburguesismo da cultura nova" (The anti-bourgeoisism of new culture) was published, advocating for an art of a social and humanist nature. These ideas were further solidified in 1939 by Álvaro Cunhal, who systematized this tendency in his writings for O Diabo (The Devil). Cunhal envisioned a progressive art that sought to express the living and human reality of his time, simultaneously advocating for a return to figuration by suggesting that older forms could still hold meaning relevant to progress, emphasizing that content was more important than form.

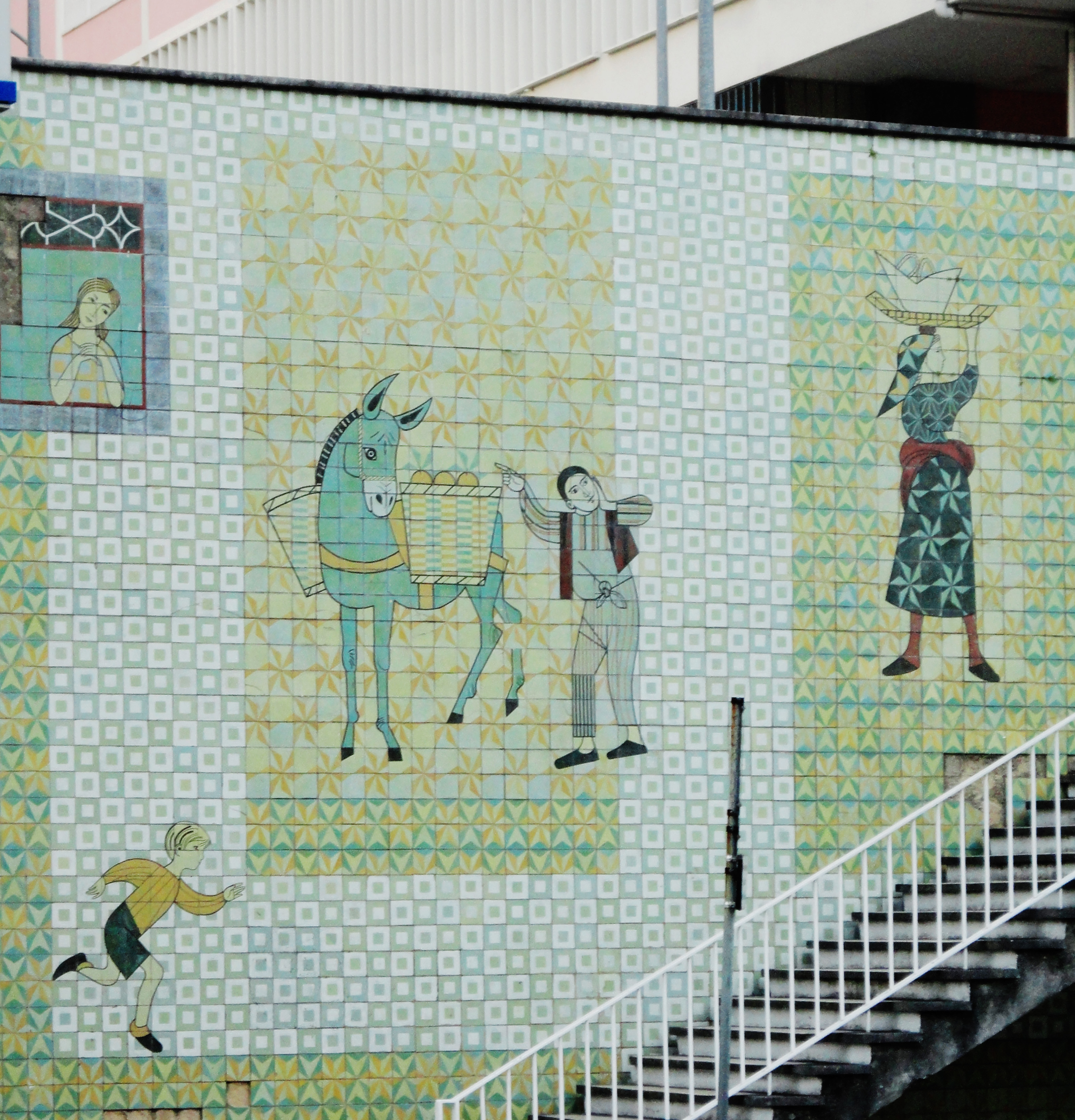
Typical figures of Lisbon (1958) by Júlio Pomar.

Júlio Pomar and Lima de Freitas emerged as prominent spokespeople for the movement, with themes that became icons of Neorealism—peasants, proletarians, fishermen, and the "common type"—dominating their writings and paintings. These works also reflected the influence of Abel Salazar, the Mexican muralists, and the Brazilian painter Cândido Portinari. Additionally, the themes of Estado Novo and Neorealism gained recognition.

While the themes of the Estado Novo and the neo-realists often overlapped, their ideological and methodological approaches diverged significantly. The Estado Novo adhered to an authoritarian, fascist framework, while some painters aligned themselves with the Communist Party, which operated underground at the time. This divergence fuelled an intense aesthetic-political debate during a period when non-partisanship was frowned upon by intellectuals, and ideological censorship and political persecution had become commonplace.

Also notable in this era was the intervention of the surrealists, led by pioneers such as António Pedro, António Dacosta and Mário Cesariny de Vasconcelos, alongside figures like António Dacosta, Marcelino Vespeira, Fernando Azevedo, Fernando Lemos and others. Their works, deeply influenced by the horrors of World War II, introduced a strong element of irrationalism, automatism, and anarchism. The surrealists delved into the complexities of the unconscious mind and explored the plastic possibilities of written text. Despite their differences, they shared the neo-realists' reformist ideals, which also made them targets of persecution.

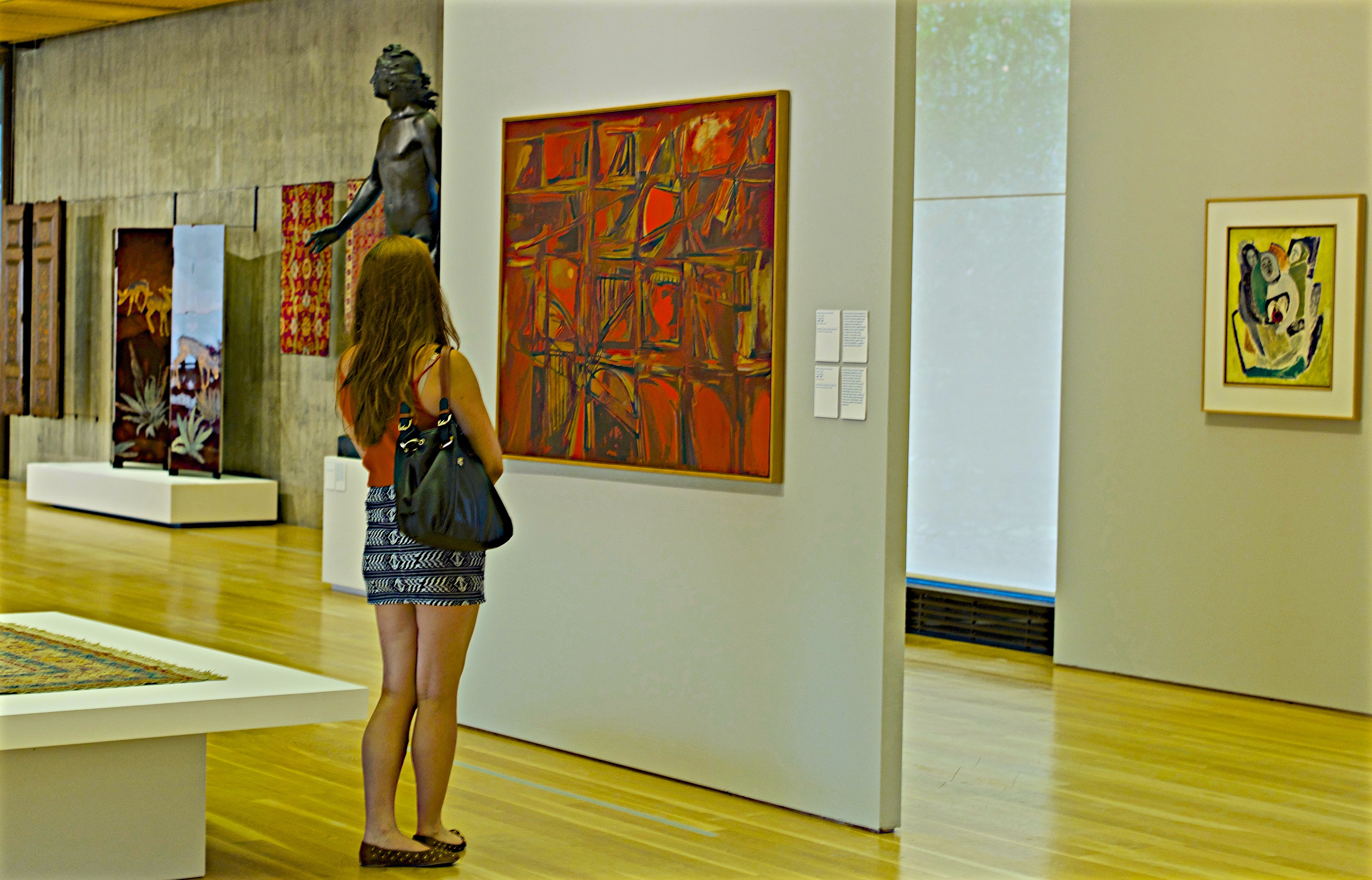
Maria Helena Vieira da Silva's works on display.

The surrealist movement spurred the development of a unique form of abstraction in Portugal, known as Lyrical Abstractionism. Artists such as Fernando Azevedo, Fernando Lanhas, Joaquim Rodrigo, René Bértholo, and Vespeira were central to this style. Meanwhile, Lanhas, Rodrigo, and Nadir Afonso played significant roles in the advancement of Geometric abstraction. Additionally, the abstract artist Maria Helena Vieira da Silva gained prominence, though much of her work was produced abroad. A Biblioteca em fogo was selected as one of the ten most important artistic works in Portugal by the Europeana project. Carlos Botelho, connected to Expressionism, was known for his street scenes of Lisbon.

In the 1950s, the debate between modern formalism versus abstractionism and neo-realist content versus figurativism persisted, fuelled by the enduring influence of a retrograde academic tradition. Emerging artists of the new generation, driven by a shared pursuit of socially relevant art but working from diverse approaches, included Querubim Lapa, João Hogan, Augusto Gomes, Arlindo Vicente, Mário Dionísio, Avelino da Costa Cunhal, Nuno San Payo, Manuel Ribeiro de Pavia, Cipriano Dourado, and sculptors Maria Barreira, Vasco da Conceição, Jorge Vieira, and Lagoa Henriques.

Critiquing the Sixth General Exhibition of Plastic Arts in 1951, Lima de Freitas urged young artists to sustain their enthusiasm for social issues and avoid allowing sentimentality, formalism, or exaggerated lyricism to obscure the "brutal and impetuous reality of things and men." He called on them to remain committed to portraying everyday life and creating art aimed at reforming the world for a better future.

António Areal was a forerunner of Nova Figuração (New Figuration) followed, to some extent, by Nuno de Siqueira. António Quadros (1933-1994) graduated in painting from the Porto School of Fine Arts. In 1958-1959 he was at the École des Beaux-Arts de Paris on a scholarship from the Calouste Gulbenkian Foundation. He was influenced by Marc Chagall and Pablo Picasso, as well as by Mexican painters and Latin American surrealists. He was also a ceramist and is credited with discovering the ceramist Rosa Ramalho. His Raparigas (Girls, 1950-1958, Museu Nacional Soares dos Reis) depicts two stylized girls, possibly Mexican (or Asian) peasants, sitting back-to-back, bathed in an intense dark blue light.

Throughout the decade, the art world remained caught in this impasse between figuration and abstraction.

=== Contemporary artists ===
Main page: Portuguese contemporary art

The 1960s-70s transformed art, as painting reached its limits in figuration and abstraction. Conceptual art rose, blurring traditional artistic boundaries and demanding active viewer engagement. New forms like performance, body art, and installations emerged. Painting shifted to new media, materials, and concepts, losing dominance to "total art," where ideas surpassed physical works.

The 1960s-70s in Portugal saw tension between old and new as Modernism and Naturalism clashed with calls for renewal. The Portuguese Colonial War and the Estado Novo (Portugal) regime stifled change. True freedom came with democracy's return. Despite challenges, painting embraced influences from Pop Art, Minimalism, and Op Art.

Minimalism flourished in the 1980s, first in music, then painting, sculpture, and engraving. Minimalist painting embraced abstraction with simple designs and limited colors, while sculpture emphasized bold simplicity, enhanced by color and lighting. Vitor Pomar, active since the 1970s, gained prominence, marking a pivotal moment in Portuguese minimalist art.

In the 1980s, art education formalized, fostering creativity and reflecting post-dictatorship cultural liberation. Postmodernism revived traditional painting while exploring urban themes, politics, gender, multiculturalism, and globalization. New media like computers, the internet, and street art broadened artistic horizons. The art market thrived with new galleries, marking an era of individual expression and the decline of utopian ideals.

Diversity and cosmopolitanism are now seen as the essence of modern times and strength, integral to Portuguese culture. Portugal, a key player in transcontinental globalization since the Age of Discovery, continues to shape cultural understanding. Intellectuals are moving past nostalgic views of national identity, embracing the past as a vibrant present with promising future prospects.

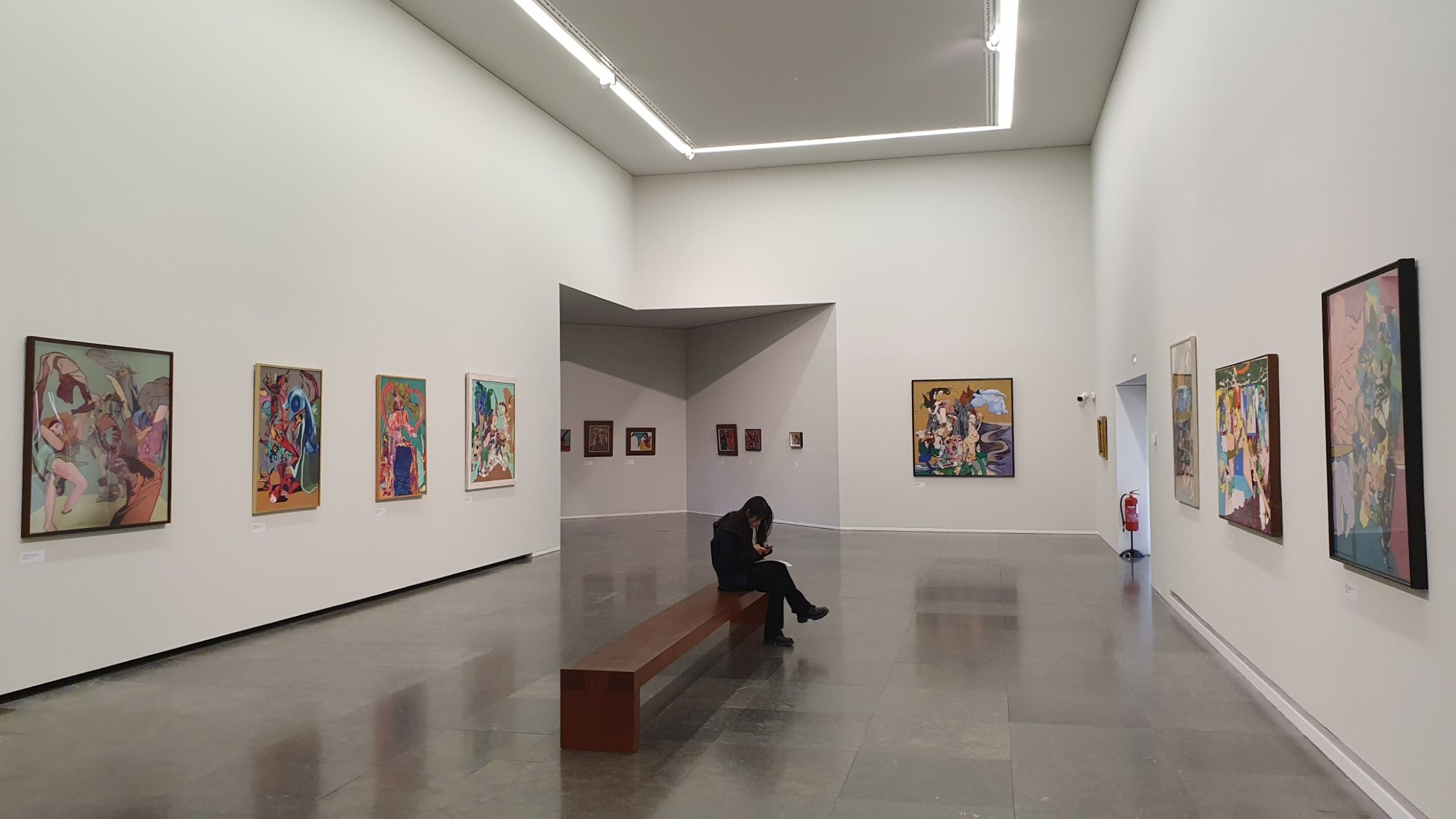
Paula Rego's works on display.

The rapid succession and blending of styles in recent decades make it difficult to define this period as anything other than a new eclecticism. It is also challenging to compile a comprehensive list of all the notable artists contributing to recent Portuguese painting. However, some key figures include Nadir Afonso, Ângelo de Sousa, Graça Morais, Albuquerque Mendes, Paula Rego. Other artists are mentioned in the main page on Portuguese contemporary art.

Paula Rego is celebrated for her narrative-driven paintings, including works like Dog Woman and Abortion and Untitled: The Abortion Series, which responded to Portugal's abortion referendum. Her art has been showcased at Tate Modern and Casa das Histórias Paula Rego. Rego also worked in azulejo, with pieces featured in the Lisbon Metro. Contemporary azulejaria artists like Júlio Pomar and Manuel Cargaleiro have influenced European art with geometric forms and a contrasting style, shaping the modern evolution of this medium.

The Berardo Collection features paintings by Jorge Martins, whose works create a "porous space" open to diverse visual codes and influences, including cinema, photography, graphic design, and painting, often echoing minimalist sculpture and literary themes.

Carlos Barahona Possollo is known for his mythical and iconographic themes. His representation of mythology is unconventional, depicting Greek and Roman gods, Catholic saints, fauns, and other creatures in unexpected poses, often in private moments with clear contemporary influences.

Alberto Lume's work spans from abstract to academic styles. His themes are a blend of simplicity, bucolic charm, naïve expressiveness, and subtle natural sensuality. Lume's delicate balance of colors, themes, and characters reflects extraordinary sensitivity.

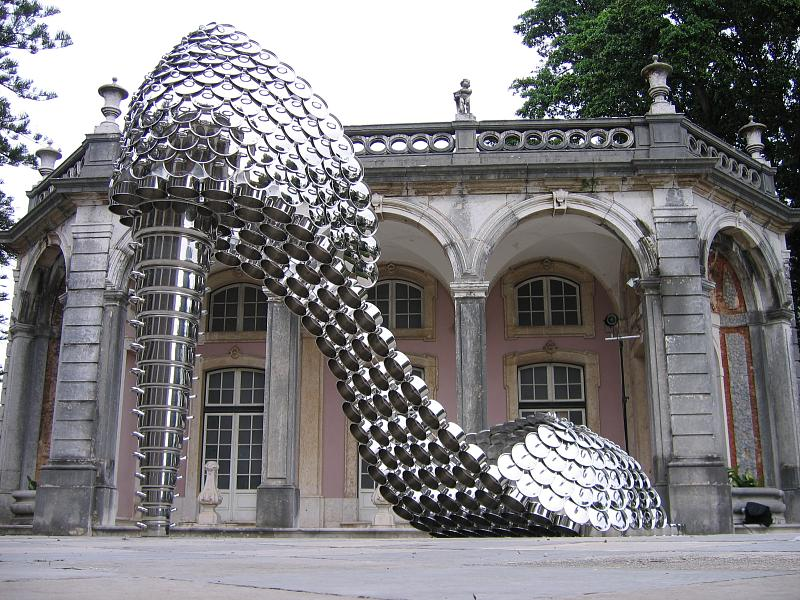
Shoe of pots (2007) by Joana Vasconcelos.

In 2006, the Belém Cultural Center held a retrospective of Lume's work. Previously, Serralves had showcased Paula Rego's art to 200,000 visitors. Today, Joana Vasconcelos represents Portugal's growing influence in contemporary art.

In 2007, Portugal opened the Berardo Collection Museum at the Belém Cultural Center in Lisbon. Serralves in Porto is also internationally acclaimed.

In 2012, the "Portugal Telecom Foundation" modern art collection became one of the few touring collections in Portugal, showcasing significant Portuguese artists from the 1960s onward, including Lourdes Castro, Alberto Carneiro, Helena Almeida, António Palolo. Artists with a page in Portuguese are mentioned in the main page on Portuguese contemporary art. Female artists have been prominent in Portugal in recent decades. In 2021 the Calouste Gulbenkian Museum in Lisbon presented an exhibition called All I Want featuring the work of 40 women from the beginning of the 20th century.

== Azulejos ==
The Portuguese glazed tiles (azulejos) are one of Portugal's best decorative arts. Many 16th and 17th century buildings are lined with tiles, and the rooms and halls of palaces and mansions have tilted panels following a colour motif. Some prime examples of this style of art are the Pátio da Carranca (courtyard of Carranca) of the Sintra National Palace, the São Roque church in Lisbon and the Quinta da Bacalhoa at Vila Fresca de Azeitão near Setúbal.
