= Igreja e Convento de Nossa Senhora de Jesus do Sítio =

Church building in Santarém, Santarém District, Portugal

Coordinates: 39.2332°N 8.6870°W

Igreja e Convento de Nossa Senhora de Jesus do Sítio (The Convent of Our Lady of Jesus), also known as Church of the hospital, is a church in Santarém, Portugal, just outside the city walls. It has been classified as a national monument since 1923.

== History ==
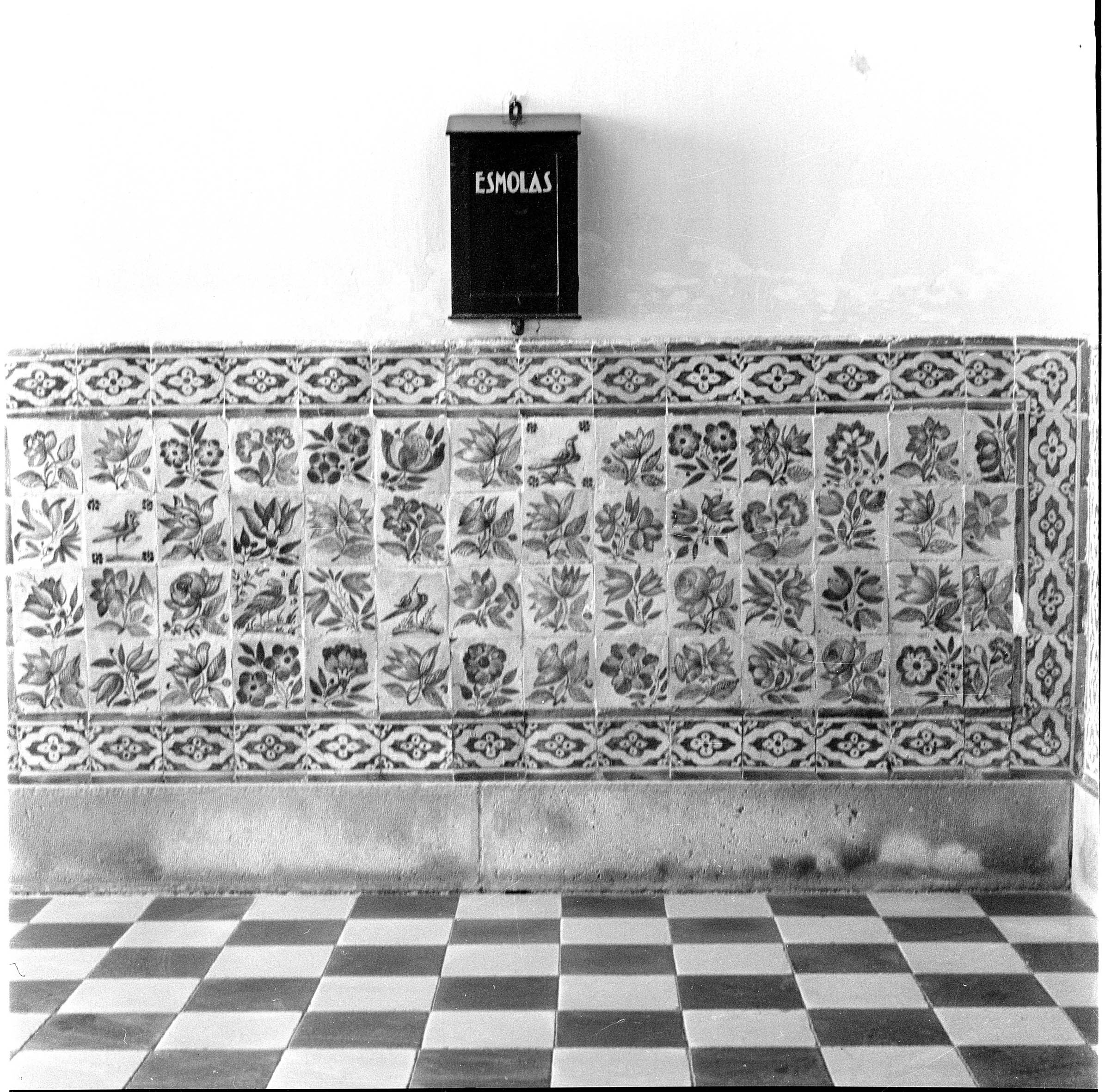
Igreja e Convento de Nossa Senhora de Jesus do Sítio, c. 1960-1970

In the late seventeenth century, the convent was founded by D. Miguel Castro, Archbishop of Lisbon, to house the friars of the Third Order of Saint Francis. The convent was built in the area then known as 'Out of Town', where the palace of the Archbishops and the Chapel of St. Mary Magdalene formerly stood. Later, in the nineteenth century, the 'Hospital João Afonso' was built next to the convent, where it remained until the 1980s.

== Architecture ==
The convent church is one of the best examples of the Portuguese Mannerism style. Adjoining the church, lies the Chapel of the Third Order of St. Francis, also known as the 'Golden Chapel', considered a masterpiece of national baroque style, completely gilded.
