= Paschal Lamb (Josefa de Óbidos) =

Painting by Josefa de Óbidos

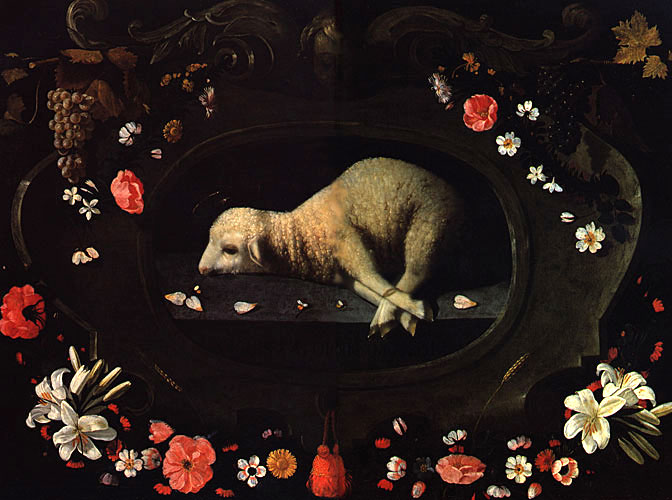
- Artist: Josefa de Óbidos
- Year: 1660s
- Type: Oil on canvas
- Dimensions: 88 cm × 116 cm (35 in × 46 in)
- Location: Frei Manuel do Cenáculo National Museum, Évora

Paschal Lamb (also known as Mystic Lamb or Agnus Dei), is an oil on canvas painting by the Portuguese artist Josefa de Óbidos. It was painted between 1660 and 1670. It is held at the Frei Manuel do Cenáculo National Museum, in Évora.

== Description ==
Iconographically, it represents the Lamb of God, depicting Jesus Christ as a sacrificed lamb for the remission of humanity's sins. The lamb appears on an altar, with its feet bound, calmly accepting its fate. It is surrounded by a floral frame featuring flowers and grapes, referencing the transubstantiation. An inscription, which it shares with The Walters Art Museum version, shows the Latin phrase: "occīsus ab orīgine mundī".

== Influence ==
The figure of the Lamb of God recalls a series of paintings called Agnus Dei by the Spanish painter Francisco de Zurbarán, created between 1635 and 1640. The artist had contact with Zurbarán through her father, the painter Baltazar Gomes Figueira, who also lived in Seville. Her father used the same sheep in his work Still Life with Lamb and Game Pieces (painted between 1645 and 1655), which is also exhibited at the Évora Museum.

== Other versions ==
Josefa de Óbidos also painted other versions of the same subject, one, without the floral frame, is held at The Walters Art Museum, in Baltimore. Other is at the Palace of the Dukes of Braganza, in Guimarães.

== See also ==
- Agnus Dei (Zurbarán)
