= Artur Loureiro =

Portuguese painter (1853–1932)

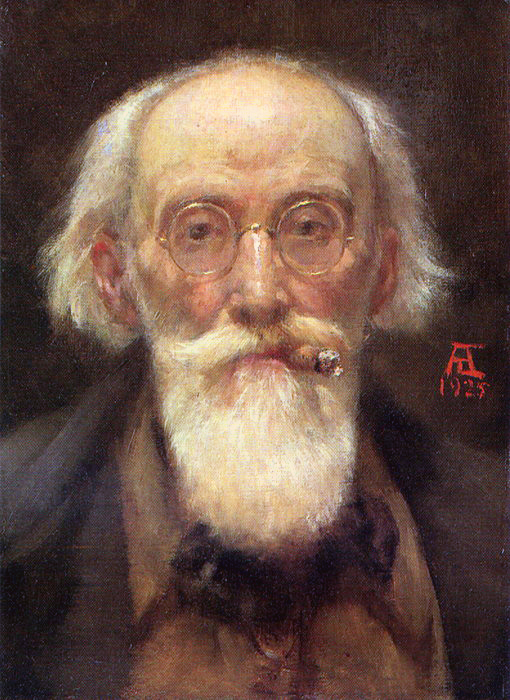
- Self-portrait (1925)
- Born: 11 February 1853; Porto, Portugal
- Died: 7 July 1932 (aged 79); Terras de Bouro, Portugal
- Known for: Painting
- Movement: Naturalism

Artur José de Sousa Loureiro (11 February 1853 – 7 July 1932) was a Portuguese painter.

== Life and work ==
He took his first lessons in drawing and painting from his friend António José da Costa (1840-1929). He later attended the Escola Superior de Belas-Artes do Porto, where he studied under João António Correia. In 1875, he went to Rome with the support of his patron Delfim Guedes (1842-1895), the future Count of Almedina.

In 1879, he moved to Paris with a scholarship to study at the École des Beaux-arts; living in the Latin Quarter and obtaining a position in the studios of Alexandre Cabanel. He exhibited at the Salon from 1880 to 1882, along with his fellow painters from Portugal João Marques de Oliveira, António Silva Porto, José Júlio de Souza Pinto, Columbano Bordalo Pinheiro and João Vaz. While in France, he met Marie Huybers (the sister of novelist Jessie Couvreur) and married her, even though marriage violated the terms of his scholarship. He sought another scholarship, but illness prevented him from submitting an entry. Afterwards, he moved to London, where his exhibits attracted attention, but his health required a warmer climate.

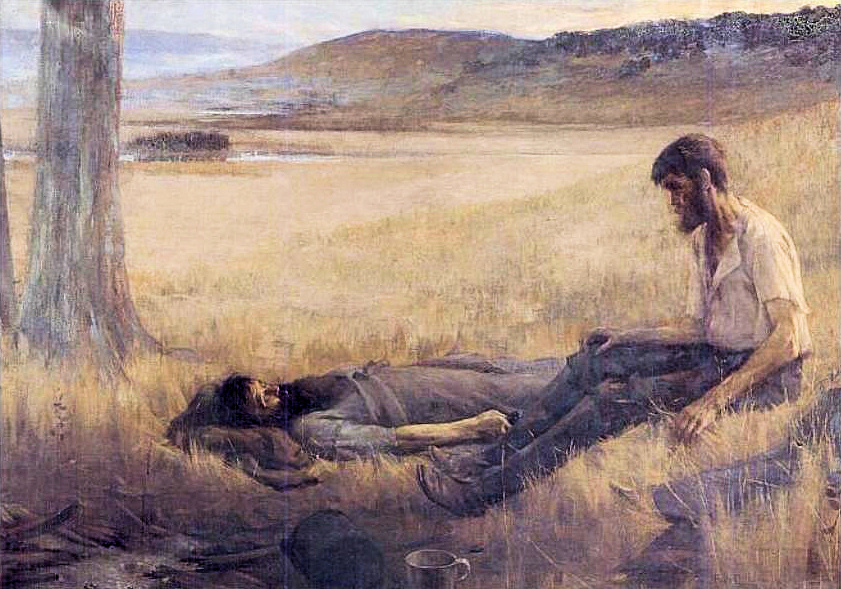
The Death of Burke (1892)

In 1884, he emigrated with Marie to her native Australia, although he spoke little English (he and Marie used French), and settled in Melbourne. The following year, he joined the first Australian Art Association, which merged with the Victorian Artists Society in 1888. He became a "Professor of Design" at the Presbyterian Ladies Academy, sat on several art juries and was named Inspector for the National Gallery of Victoria.

After inexplicably leaving his wife Marie and their three children in Melbourne in 1901 he returned to Porto, where he established a studio at the "Crystal Palace" (an exhibition hall modelled after the one in London). It quickly became a gathering place for local artists and their students. His only son was killed during World War I and he remarried in 1918. A few months before his death in 1932, he was awarded the Order of Saint James of the Sword. He died suddenly while on a landscape painting sojourn in the countryside.

The Soares dos Reis National Museum houses his Retrato de senhora, a portrait of a lady dressed in black (as well as Rio Douro (1906) by his pupil Manuel Maria Lúcio, 1865-1943)

Manuel Maria Lúcio (1865-1943), a landscape painter, was his favorite pupil.
