= Portuguese contemporary art =

Portuguese contemporary art is all the art produced in Portugal after the Carnation Revolution; however, even before then, there were already some artists that could be characterized as contemporary.

== Architecture ==
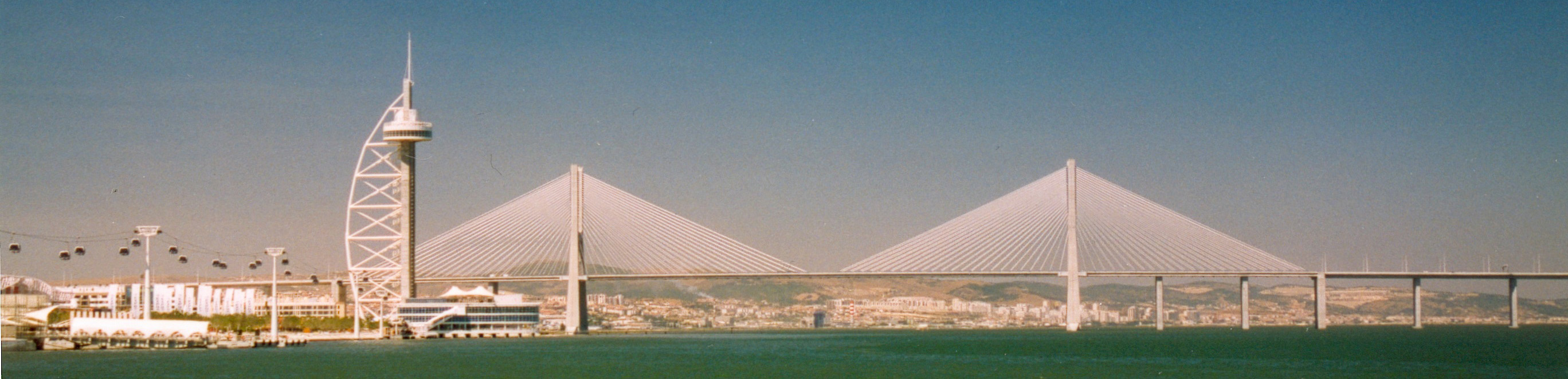
Panoramic view of Expo 98 and the Vasco da Gama Bridge

The work of Álvaro Siza Vieira looms large in the 1970s, '80s and the '90s. Other architects considered influential are Manuel Taínha, Jorge Ferreira Chaves, Fernando Távora, Eduardo Souto Moura and Nuno Teotónio Pereira. The emergence of the new architect generations that came to succeed the referred architects introduced a progressive expansion of the arquitectonic tendencies. Tomás Taveira gains fame and renown through his personal exhibition, which took place at the Amoreiras Shopping Center (Centro Comercial das Amoreiras), in Lisbon. Álvaro Siza Vieira, already known for the rebuild of Chiado (traditional Lisbon neighbourhood on the left side of Rua Augusta), after being destroyed by a fire, designed the Portugal Pavilion for Expo 98 with his friend, Eduardo Souto Moura.

This contemporary architecture sample graced with worldwide exposure in 1998 stood out as a landmark for 20th century Portuguese history, promoting Portuguese works recognized national and internationally, such as the Vasco da Gama tower, Pavilhão Atlântico, Lisbon oceanarium or the Portugal Pavilion. The theme was “the oceans”, very adequate for the event as Portugal is historically known for sailing throughout unknown oceans, and reaching some remote places such as Sri Lank, India, Macau or Brazil. Accompanied by its sea tradition, Portugal has come back to its roots, turning what is now Parque das Nações into the biggest site for contemporary architecture sample in Lisbon. Another important landmark was also built in 1998: the second longest bridge in Europe - the Vasco da Gama Bridge.

Casa da Música (House of Music), built in Oporto and designed by Dutch architect Rem Koolhaas, has brought new life to contemporary Portuguese architecture. It was built as part of the project of Porto - European Capital of Culture.

== Painting, sculpture and ceramics ==
The 1960s and 1970s were a period of profound transformation and crisis in the art world. Traditional approaches to painting appeared to have reached their limits, with nearly every conceivable form of figuration and abstraction already explored. This era saw the rise of conceptual art, which fundamentally challenged the boundaries between the traditional artistic categories —painting, sculpture, dance, theatre, and others— requiring viewers to participate more actively in the creative and contemplative process. Performances, body art, kinetic art, installations emerged. Painting itself underwent a radical shift: it migrated to new media, incorporated new materials, dematerialised, and redefined the nature of representation. It lost its traditional dominance within the arts, merging into a broader vision of "total art," where the concept took precedence over the artwork itself.

The rejection of established rules and a spirit of experimentalism became the norm as culture began to massify. In Portugal, this period was marked by a tension between lingering elements of Modernism and Naturalism and an urgent need for renewal. This urgency was partially stifled by the onset of the Portuguese Colonial War (1961–1974), the country's detachment from the international movements of 1968, and the persistence of the Estado Novo (Portugal) regime even after António de Oliveira Salazar's death in 1970. Genuine change, along with a climate of true freedom of expression, would have to wait until full democracy was restored. Despite these challenges, painting as an autonomous genre (and sculpture) withstood the harsh critiques of conceptualists who questioned traditional media. It began to absorb influences from Pop Art, Minimalism, and Op Art.

Minimalism asserted itself in the 1980s. Initially, it emerged subtly in classical music before gradually spreading to other art forms such as painting and sculpture. While minimalist painting remained understated, characterized by simplified designs derived from abstractionism and a restricted color palette, minimalist sculpture became a more prominent expression of the movement. In sculpture, minimalism embraced bold simplicity, emphasizing details through the use of color and artificial lighting in the exhibition space. Engraving followed a similar trajectory. It was during this period that Vitor Pomar, who had first emerged in the 1970s, rose to prominence in the Portuguese art scene.

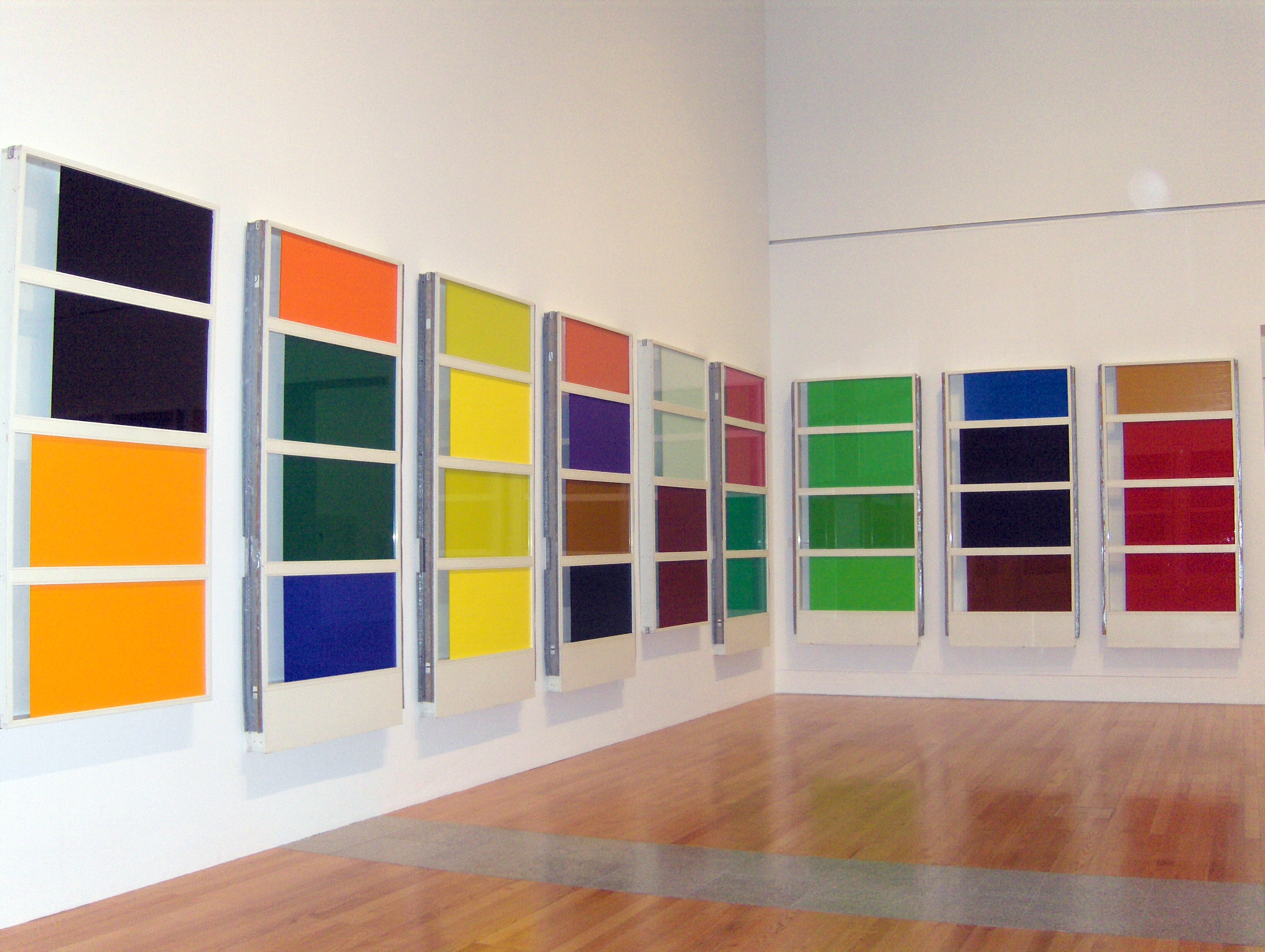
Pedro Cabrita Reis' Cabinet d’Amateur -2 (Stockholm version)

Photography regained recognition as a respected art form in the 1980s, having been largely overlooked since the surrealist period. Minimalist photography emerged during this time, incorporating common elements from minimalist sculpture and painting, such as simplicity, clean lines, and an emphasis on form and composition.

From the 1980s, schools formalized art education to nurture creativity and embrace cultural change, reflecting a societal shift toward liberation from traditional conventions. This evolution mirrored the broader cultural changes following the end of the dictatorship in the country. Conceptual questioning persisted, accompanied by a dynamic revival of traditional forms of painting within the context of the international Postmodern movement. This movement re-evaluated the rich heritage of pictorial traditions while embracing new themes, placing cosmopolitan urban life at its center. Issues such as environmentalism, politics, generational conflicts, violence, sexuality, gender equality, multiculturalism, and the globalization of culture came to the forefront. Additionally, the emergence of new media, including computers, the internet, and street art, expanded artistic possibilities. The art market flourished, with the establishment of new galleries, but the era's compelling plurality also marked the decline of utopian ideals. Painting no longer adhered to pre-established ideologies, instead becoming a vehicle for individual expression. As Miguel Leal aptly observes, it now serves primarily as an articulation of personal poetics :

"In fact, globalisation and the acceleration of information flow, supported by an increasingly intricate network of interconnected systems, have left an indelible mark on Portuguese art of this period. While the peripheral and derivative nature of Portuguese art had long been a defining characteristic, the past few decades cannot be understood without continually looking beyond this small universe that is ours."

Rather than being viewed as a problem or a source of confusion and identity blurring, this diversity and cosmopolitanism are now recognized as the true essence of modern times and its strength. It is impossible to ignore them without undermining Portuguese culture. In this context, Portugal emerges as an essential reference in the study of transcontinental cultural globalization, having been one of the first nations to break down borders through the sea voyages of the Age of Discovery and the establishment of its many colonies across America, Africa, and Asia. Consequently, Portuguese intellectuals are increasingly seeking to move beyond the nostalgic resentment that once surrounded the century-long effort to define a national identity. They now view the past not merely as memory or a historical document but as a vibrant present with promising prospects for the future. As João Paulo Oliveira and Teresa Lacerda Costa note:

"Until the 15th century, no civilization truly understood the true size of the planet or the wealth—both human and geographical—that existed across it. Unlike earlier empires, the new empires born from globalization were initially shaped by maritime expansion. The opening of the Atlantic Ocean was pivotal in launching this process. In fact, the Atlantic represented the last significant barrier to human movement across the globe, and Gil Eanes' voyage in 1434 effectively opened the door to Modernity. His journey overcame the myth of what the ancients called the Dark Sea, which had long hindered movement across the ocean and intercontinental communication."

The rapid succession and blending of styles in recent decades make it difficult to define this period as anything other than a new eclecticism, which characterizes all contemporary painting. It is also challenging to compile a comprehensive list of all the notable artists contributing to recent Portuguese painting. However, some key figures include Nadir Afonso, Álvaro Lapa, Ângelo de Sousa, Armando Alves, and members of the Puzzle Group such as Graça Morais, Pedro Rocha, and Albuquerque Mendes, and Carlos Carreiro; as well as Abreu Pessegueiro, Paula Rego, Alfredo Martins, Fernando Pereira, José Grazina, Manuela Pinheiro, Miguel Petchkovsky, Raul Perez, and Rui Amaral.

Júlio Pomar's work became very politically and ideologically engaged during his neo-realist phase, from 1945 to 1957. He was one of the main organizers and exhibitors of the General Exhibitions of Plastic Arts (Lisbon), from 1946 to 1956, which were the main exhibitions of Portuguese neo-realist painting during this time. In 1947 there was a police raid with the seizure of works by Júlio Pomar (Resistência), Maria Keil, Rui Pimentel (Arco), Manuel Ribeiro de Pavia, Arnaldo Louro de Almeida, Nuno Tavares and José Viana, among others. From the third exhibition, in May 1948, the shows were subject to prior censorship. Cipriano Dourado (1921–1981) was an anti-fascist and staunch opponent of the regime. The most frequent themes in his work are women and the land. He was very active as an engraver and belonged to the Gravura – Sociedade Cooperativa de Gravadores Portugueses. In 1953, led by the novelist Alves Redol, with Júlio Pomar and Rogério Ribeiro, he set off for the Ribatejo to work as a team on the theme of rice paddies. Mário Dionísio "took part in a joint effort to bring art and the public closer together, which resulted, for example, in A Paleta e o Mundo (The Palette and the World), a series of lessons on modern art." José Dias Coelho, a painter and sculptor, was also a prominent figure in Portuguese social realism and a member of the Portuguese Communist Party. His works often depicted the working class and themes of resistance against oppression. He was assassinated by the PIDE (Estado Novo's secret police) for his political activities.

Paula Rego is known for her "storytelling" in painting. She gained widespread recognition for works such as Dog Woman (1990s), and Untitled: The Abortion Series, which was her response to the referendum in Portugal on November 11, 1998 which confirmed abortion as a crime. Her art has been displayed in museums such as Tate Modern in London and Casa das Histórias Paula Rego, in Cascais (dedicated solely to her art). She also worked in azuleijaria (painted tin-glazed ceramic tilework). The Lisbon Metro has some of her works decorating its walls. Many of her works belong to private collections like the Berardo Collection. Other artists that work in contemporary azulejaria are Júlio Pomar and Júlio Resende, artists who are becoming references in contemporary European painting. Manuel Cargaleiro and Querubin Lapa are prominent figures in azulejaria, pioneering a new style rooted in contrasts—an approach uniquely suited to the versatility of the azulejo. They also played a key role in popularizing the use of geometric figures in contemporary art.

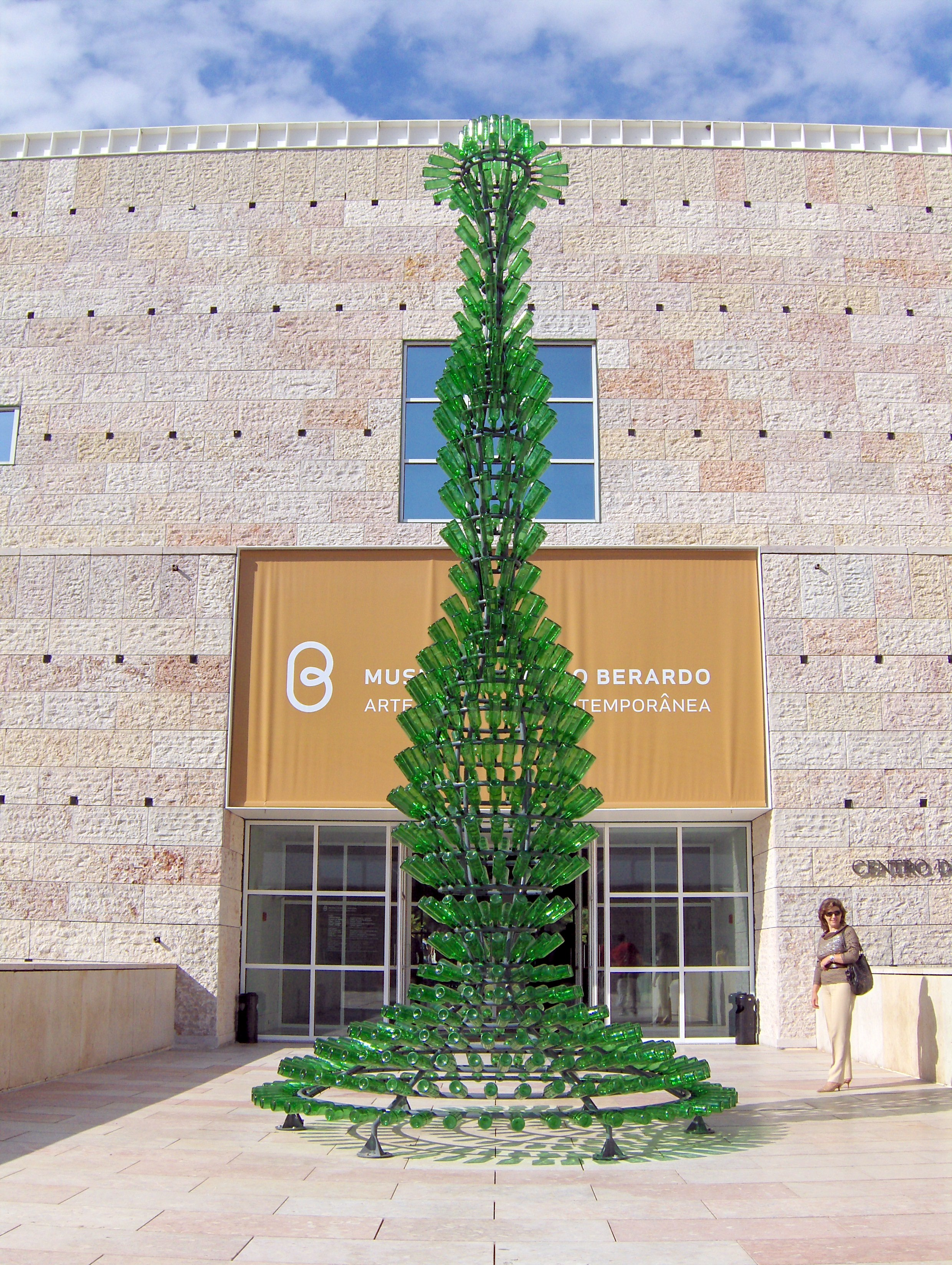
Joana Vasconcelos Néctar, at the entrance of the Berardo Museum.

The Berardo Collection also has valuable paintings by Jorge Martins. His multifaceted works can be described as a "porous space, open to a diverse range of visual codes and influences—from cinema and photography to graphic design and painting. [...] Within these images, one can often sense the echo of cinematic lighting, the essence of minimalist sculpture, or a phrase borrowed from theory or literature, visually reimagined and brought into dialogue."

Carlos Barahona Possollo is one of the most famous contemporary Portuguese artists. His themes are often mythical and iconographic, but his approach to the representation of mythology is far from traditional: the gods of Greek and Roman antiquity, Catholic saints, fauns and other mythical creatures are often seen in unexpected poses and attitudes, often almost surprised in scenes from their private lives and often with obvious contemporary marks.

Alberto Lume is also a prominent Portuguese artist. Collector Raul A. A. da Silveira comments: "His style spans a wide spectrum, ranging from the almost abstract to the academic. His themes intertwine simplicity, bucolic charm, and a naïve expressiveness, infused with a subtle note of natural sensuality that is visually captivating and profoundly soothing to the spirit. The delicate balance he achieves between colors, themes, and characters reveals an extraordinary sensitivity that resonates deeply with those who view or own his paintings—a quality that is both immensely gratifying and rare."

Miguel Branco studied painting at Lisbon's Faculty of Fine Arts. His artistic practice has primarily focused on oil painting, with creations notable for their intimate scale and a striking material richness, often maintaining a connection to figuration. From 1989, Miguel Branco (has) led the Painting Department at Ar.Co. His works, typically titled "Sem Título (Pequena figura sobre fundo verde)" or "Sem Título (Pequena figura de esquiador com fundo amarelo)" (Untitled – Small Figure of a Skier on a Yellow Background / on a Green Background), can be admired at the Gulbenkian Foundation in Lisbon.

Vhils, born in 1987, is a graffiti and street artist.

In 2006, the Belém Cultural Center hosted a retrospective exhibition of his work. Earlier, Serralves also organized an exhibition of Paula Rego's work, which drew an impressive audience of around 200,000 people. Portugal today plays an increasingly significant role in contemporary painting and sculpture. Joana Vasconcelos, one of the most prominent Portuguese contemporary artists of the late 1980s generation, exemplifies this rising prominence. In 2007, Portugal further cemented its place in the art world with the opening of the Berardo Collection Museum at the Belém Cultural Center in Lisbon. Additionally, Fundação Serralves in Porto stands as an internationally acclaimed art institution.

In 2012, the modern art collection “Portugal Telecom Foundation” continues to be one of the only collections that has been touring around the country during the last years, promoting some of the most important modern Portuguese artists from the 1960s and onwards, like (apart from P. Rego) Joaquim Rodrigo, Lourdes Castro, Alberto Carneiro, Eduardo Batarda, João Rodrigues Vieira, Jorge Vieira, Jorge Molder, Júlia Ventura, Helena Almeida, Fernando Brito, Manuel João Vieira, Marta Wengorovius, Rita Barros, Eva Mota, Álvaro Lapa, Sara Anathory, Miguel Soares, Joana Rosa, António Palolo, Gerardo Burmester, Joaquim Bravo, Maria José Oliveira or Joao Vilhena.

Museums exhibiting paintings by Portuguese artists, outside Portugal, include the Hispanic Society of America (New York): and the Centre Pompidou, Paris

== Installation art ==
Although still not quite known among the Portuguese public or widely acknowledged on a European level, “installation art” is, however, beginning to take its first steps. Quite a few artists are working hard to achieve the recognition of this art, which sprung in Portugal, during the 1990s, at the core of a well-rooted rock culture. Joana Vasconcelos is one of the most famous artists using pop culture elements on a large scale as well as everyday objects when building her sculptures. In 2005, she presented "A Noiva" (“The Bride”) during Veneza's Bienniel, with Ângela Ferreira as the official representative (project commissioned by Jurgen Bock). Néctar is a batch composed of two sculptures comprised in Colecção Berardo, headquartered in CCB, along with its Aladino installation.

== Contemporary fashion ==
Back then, runways were no more than a confection's display, and any dressmaker who dared to venture and be innovative was set aside. However, there have been some designers who did not let this happen and fought through all criticism aimed at them, such as Ana Salazar. She carried out the work in Portugal which Chanel had done decades ago in France: breaking with the canons and granting women more freedom. Furthermore, her originality combined with the irreverence of her various styles have made her the most eccentric female Portuguese designer in European History. She has gained fame and remarkable success in the Portuguese spectrum, an artist which many had called “unaesthetic”. Ana Salazar became the great exponent of Portuguese contemporary fashion, being the first Portuguese fashion designer to ever go international. Nonetheless, her days of glory are gone and her creations are no longer unique nor the newest. Many other designers emerged on the scene in the late eighties and nineties, such as Miguel Vieira. This designer, whose collections are made out of black and white (and out of grey as well, at a later stage), stands out due to his creations’ perfect, classic and rather flexible shapes, specially made for the modern executive woman. His glamorous style is called city chick. João Rôlo becomes an “elite designer”, claiming to be the only Haute-Couture Portuguese designer, which is far from the truth... The revival of José António Tenente, the man who dressed Maria José Ritta, the former first lady, in international events, and who does also explore city chick is known for his flushing evening gowns and their perfect cut, many of whose were worn by Bárbara Guimarães during the Golden Globes awards. Not to mention Manuel Alves and José Manuel Gonçalves whose creations never fail to amaze us and are the ones favored by the high Portuguese society. Fátima Lopes appears in the nineties and becomes Ana Salazar's rival, and is the most international Portuguese designer to date, sponsored by Joe Berardo. One of her creations, and one of the best-known Portuguese pieces of art in the world, is a rather small bikini made out of gold and diamonds, priced 500.000 euros, having been worn by its very own designer on a runway in Paris. Nowadays, Portugal can be said to be a medium-sized star in the narrow and competitive Fashion World thanks to new designers such as Maria Gambina, Katty Xiomara, and Dino Alves, known as "l'enfant terrible de la mode", among others. Although there have been a few endeavors such as Portugal Fashion, in Porto, and Moda Lisboa, in the capital, the general public still fails to see the excellence in fashion as an art form, when they really should. They see the creations as a product, not as a piece of art, or a painting or an installation. Therefore, the investment is still little and the little there is, is simply not enough, leading some designers to abandon their career in favor of something more profitable and less expensive, as did Miguel Flor, a promising designer who ran out of funds to keep his fashion company alive. Despite that, the investment is rising and the interest follows, as well as the praise that Portuguese fashion designers are conquering.

== Music ==
Contemporary music in Europe is estimated to have begun in the mid-'50s. If we take into account the pop sensations that Madalena Iglesias and Simone de Oliveira were, contemporary Portuguese music should have started around the same time. And it should have happened in a rather jovial way as the young pop environment was breaking ground in society through the youngsters. Electronic music, which was rising in Germany, was then exported to Portugal, revealing itself as a success in the '80s. The pop fever got stronger in the '70s, also known as the “roaring years” along with the '20s, with the growth of equally fulminating nightclubs largely situated on the coastline. It should be mentioned that the settling of this music genre had a very uneven growth between the coastline and the midland, the north and mid-north, and the south and mid-south. Whilst coastal and cosmopolitan Lisbon was following trends, even if discretely when compared to other European capitals, the midland was still completely clueless, remaining behind its time even today. The Hippie era strikes the country with its relaxed and urban style, and Portugal adapts itself deeply to this new trend. The Disco fever emerges and with it, the nightclubs. While in a corruptible dictatorship regime, responsible for years of cultural delay in comparison to the rest of Europe, the voice of artists like that of António Variações and Carlos Paião's, among others, started to become popular. Both had an enormous success. Songs like Playback and Pó de Arroz (Rice powder) from Paião, and O Corpo é que paga (The Body pays it) from Variações, are unforgettable. The death of António Variações, in 1984 was a great loss for contemporary music. However, ten years earlier, in 1974, when Portugal was still testing the waters of this new cool disco look, peaceful revolution took place on 25 April, which defined the Portuguese way of being. The most interesting part is that the Carnation Revolution (Revolução dos Cravos), as it would later be called, started with a song: Grândola, Vila Morena, an intervention song which derived from intervention poetry. The intervention song got popular and its grieving content was a success, notwithstanding its hopeful and dreamy side, in the history of European contemporary music. Fado is put on the backburner, as it was considered to bring back memories from Salazar's dictatorship, and brought back up only in mid-‘90s. In the ‘80s, electronic music became popular and was broadcast on radio and played in nightclubs in Lisbon. The rural midland finally starts to take its first steps on catching on to its contemporaries. Electronic music begins to conquer listeners from remote areas. Portugal also joins a rather eccentric and unusual age. It’s the beginning of the age of rock music. Punk and dark rock derived from it shortly after, among others, and later on, metal and heavy metal did too. These are still conquering new listeners nowadays. By the ‘90s Xutos e Pontapés had started performing, and Rui Veloso became the best Portuguese Rock artist to date. Paulo Gonzo, Jorge Palma, Silence 4, GNR and others were also popular.

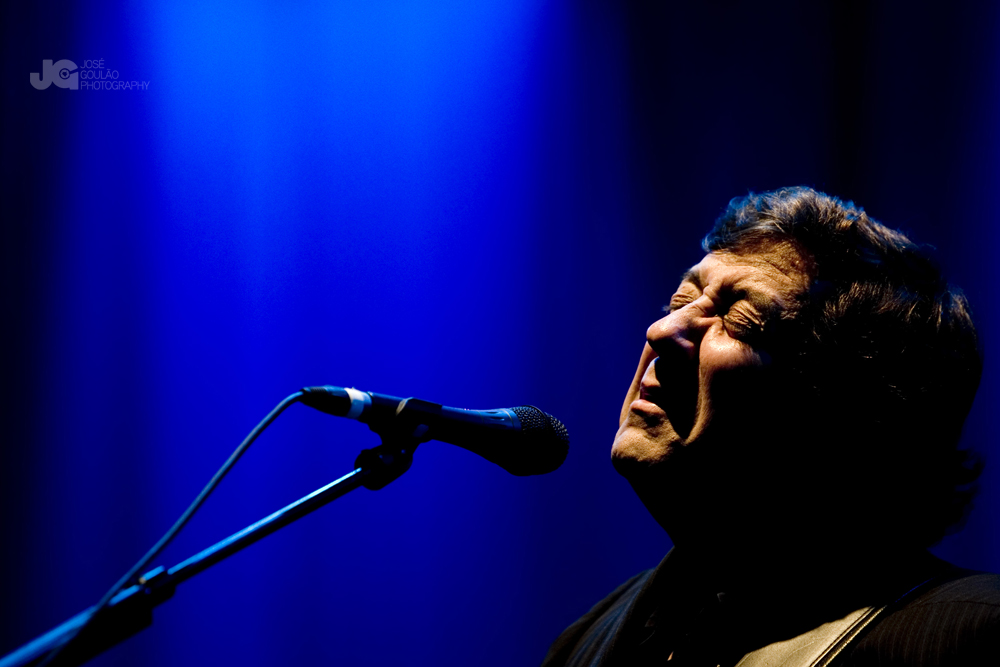
Rui Veloso.

As for erudite music, somewhat hidden until mid-‘80s, several talented composers, pianists and orchestra conductors stood out as they did everything to make this genre last through the European erudite musical scene. Mário Laginha and Maria João Pires were amongst the most talented. Carlos Tê becomes Rui Veloso’s favorite composer. In the beginning of the Portuguese pop scene, Dulce Pontes, an artist with un unmatchable voice, makes her debut and renews Fado by giving it a new voice, bringing a new life to it. She also plays around with folklore and pop (Lusitana Paixão -Lusitanian Passion- being her major pop hit), but it was thanks to Fado that she became a breakthrough in music (Canção do Mar being her major Fado hit). Sara Tavares and her ballads, together with Anabela Pires’ brilliant voice, result as two of the best voices of Portugal. Morna music's diva, Cesária Évora, also gave her contribution with her remarkable voice. Fado is finally brought back by Dulce Pontes. And a new wave of Fado singers re-emerge in a revival fashion, surging into the “plaza”, making Fado the most popular kind of music in Portugal. This wave started with Mariza, which became the diva of Fado, since the death of Amália Rodrigues, beating Dulce Pontes by far. Gonçalo Salgueiro, Ana Moura, Kátia Guerreiro, among others, followed their steps.

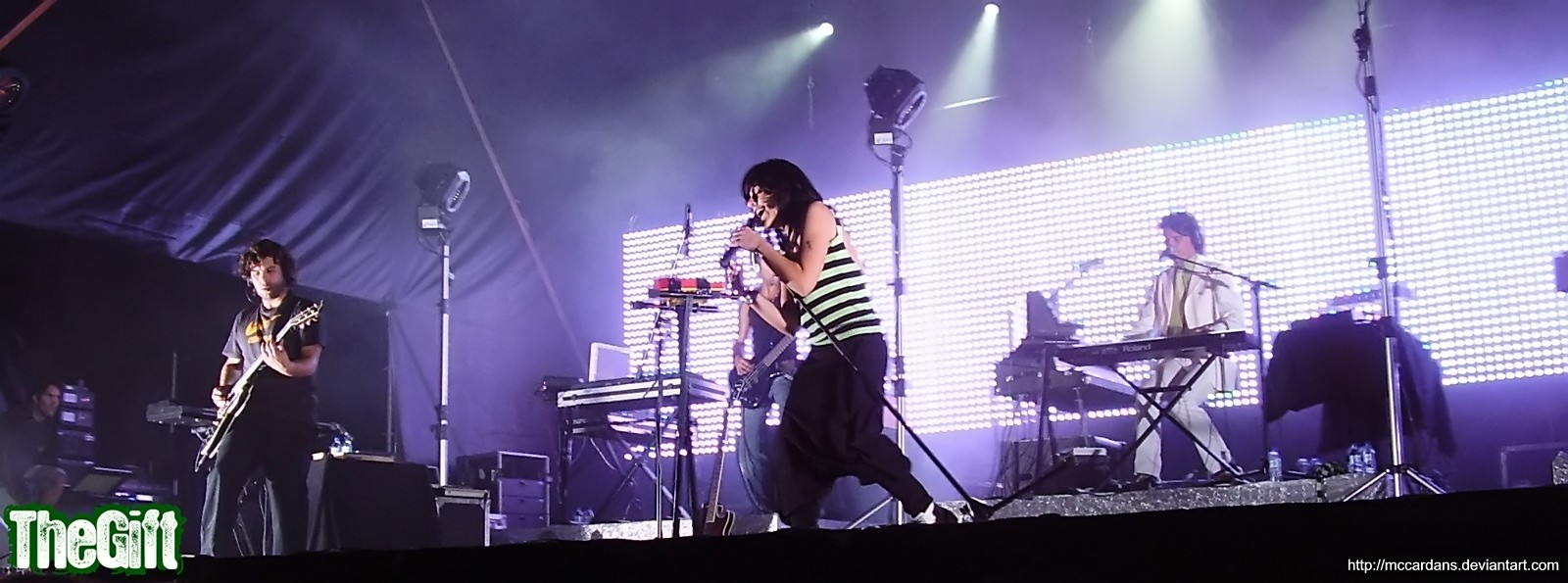
The Gift.

In 2004, Rock in Rio Lisbon happens for the first time, catapulting Portugal to top place in worldwide music. Around this time, the hip hop generation was taking over the worldwide market, and Portugal was no exception, becoming one of the four countries with the widest hip hop production, right after USA, France and Italy. Da Weasel becomes then the most popular Portuguese hip-hop band. In 2005, the MTV Europe Music Awards Lisbon were broadcast in Lisbon. This European event brings to Lisbon some of the most important faces of worldwide contemporary music, such as Madonna, Robbie Williams, Craid David and others. The Gift won the “Best Portuguese Band” category. As a band it made a huge difference by introducing something remarkably new which was making a transvestite from Lisbon the main character of their first music video. In 2006, Sam the Kid makes his commercial music a bit more Portuguese, and leaves his rebel-ish mark with a kind of music that became known as a symbol of scandal for defending the Portuguese language in an irreverent way. Fado strikes again and becomes more international. Mariza finally detaches herself from Amália Rodrigues and records her new album, Transparente, in Brazil, and importing new and tropical MPB (Brazilian popular music) sounds strengthening the cultural connections between Portugal and Brazil. The disc was hailed by the critics. Still during this year, the actress Maria de Medeiros, one of the best in Portugal, records her first album, exploring Jazz, with a Brazilian touch – its accent. MPB influences the Portuguese music more each day passed which is seen as a positive thing by the critics and the general public. Jacinta stands out as one of the best female voices in worldwide Jazz. Maria João also chose Jazz to explore her tender and warm voice.

== Literature and poetry ==
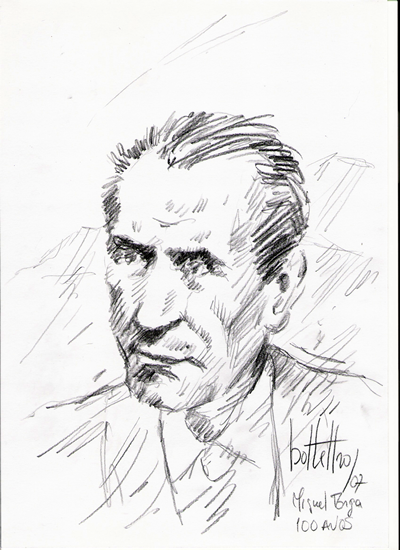
Miguel Torga.

Literature, and especially poetry, were among the few art forms that developed during the Portuguese dictatorship, thanks to a movement we call today “Intervention Poetry”. With the inexistence of freedom of speech, writers and poets had to develop new and original forms of poetry and literature writing. What would happen at the time was that whenever an author touched a forbidden theme according to the regime, they were “threatened” by the famous “lapis-azul” (Blue-Pencil in Portuguese, symbolic pen color that was used to cross out undesirable content), hence forcing writers to adopt a subtly revolutionary style, that would become one of the most remarkable artistic movements of the 20th century Intervention Poetry. Intervention Poetry scraps out the sonnets and easily done rhymes, as well as the metric syllables in literature poetry, developing a completely innovative movement that disrespects and breaks with every poetical convention. However, Intervention Poetry is not yet officially regarded as a literary artistic movement.

Zeca Afonso, with his mysterious look and creative genius; Manuel Alegre, rocked back and forth in an eternal “green pine ship” that stood against the dictatorship; and Ary dos Santos, the great vice and bohemia's icon from Lisbon's traditional neighborhoods and a merciless theorist, were some of the most important names of this movement.

Alexandre O’Neill was also a reference on the contemporary Portuguese poetry. His “Adeus Portugal” (Goodbye Portugal) and “Há palavras que nos Beijam” (There are words that kiss us) are influential Portuguese poems. In more recent times, one can watch Mariza giving voice to this last poem on her musical shows worldwide. She sang it at the Carnegie Hall, in New York, on the Royal Albert Hall in London and on the Sydney Opera among other places around the world. His poetry shows the grief brought to him by his lovers, as well as by the whole world. Pedro Homem de Melo comes off as yet another great artist from that time, even if he is slightly forgotten nowadays. It was he who wrote “povo que lavas no rio” (You People, who wash by the river), performed by Amália Rodriges. His innovative yet ideologically conservative writing supported the regime. Coming from aristocratic families who were supporters of the Salazar's dictatorship, Homem de Melo showed his sympathy to the authoritarian government through his poetry, perhaps being the reason why he is so forgotten in our days, despite his rich and recognized career. Eugénio de Andrade and António Gedeão are two of the greatest contemporary poetry geniuses. Eugénio de Andrade struggled to get in the highly restrictive literary vanguard circles: his seemingly nonsensical poetry was hardly accepted, and his genius remained unseen on the eyes of the intellectual society. Only in the ‘70s, with the implantation of the democratic liberal regime, was his talent finally recognized being awarded the Camões Prize.

Sophia de Mello Breyner, another author being distinguished, in 1999, with the Camões Prize, becomes the most famous Portuguese poet of the 20th century. She also wrote several tales for children taught nowadays in Portuguese primary schools, A Fada Oriana being an example. Her creative intellect is disturbing and impetuous, her plots memorable and transmit her outstanding imagination.

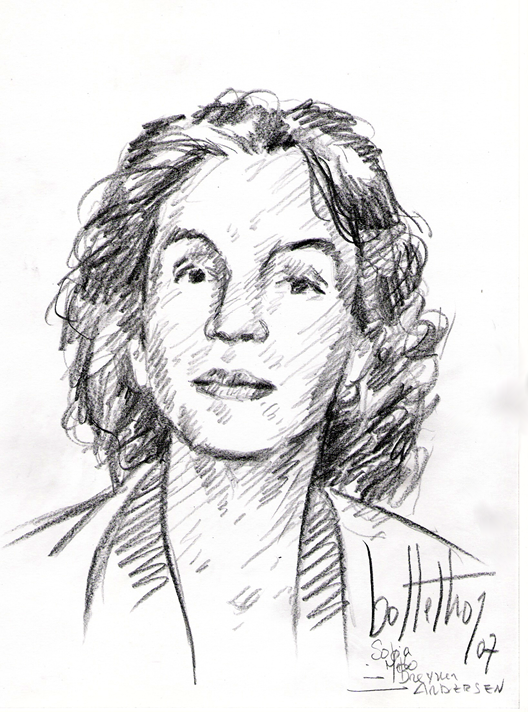
Sophia de Mello Breyner

António Gedeão is one of the most creative intervention poets, author of the renowned Pedra Filosofal. David Mourão-Ferreira, Fiama Hasse Pais Brandão, Ruy Belo and others are also included in the restricted elitist group of Portuguese contemporary writers. João Apolinário, also linked to the intervention poetry, emerges in the Portuguese and Brazilian literary background, with important and valuable contributions to the cultures of both countries. His work is the stage of a notable exchange between the Brazilian culture and the Portuguese one, adapting them both mutually. He was also an honourable journalist in São Paulo. In the literary background, Maria Aliete Galhoz, Agustina Bessa-Luís, José Régio, Maria Velho da Costa, Miguel Torga (also in poetry) and António Lobo Antunes emerged. Miguel Torga, exploring poetry and prose, created his own revolution, a “rural revolution”, since he lively portraits the rural background that was one of his and Portugal's realities. Aiming to become deputy of the Republic Assembly, Natália Correia defended the cultural and historic Azorean heritage insistently, becoming one of the main figures of Portuguese contemporary literature and poetry. It is impossible to not mention José Saramago, the “giant” of Portuguese literature, and the only Portuguese author winning the Nobel Prize for Literature thanks to the incorruptible and memorable Memorial do Convento. Lídia Jorge, with several novels that became very successful, like a Costa dos Murmúrios, adapted into a film, is considered one of the elitists of present literature. Her books reveal several “secrets” of the Algarve region where she was born and humbly raised. Her work is also stage of an enormous feminine sensitivity. Ana Maria Magalhães, Isabel Alçada and Alice Vieira helped renewing literature, adapting it, as well as History, for young people. The first two, wrote together the Uma Aventura collection, counting now with more than a million of sold books. Joel Lira also makes his way through poetry, a writer from Seixal, known by his fertile and ambitious imagination. Sombras do Meu Sentir is his most popular book, which takes the reader to an abyss between the sadness and the happiness of the main character.

== Theatre and cinema ==
Dramaturgy is not left behind; however it is more forgotten with each year. Society's evils and flaws became drama's main focus. This art form was only born in Portugal around the time Salazar was head of state, namely “Teatro de Revista”, or “Revista à portuguesa”, whose social criticism was seen as light and cheerful. Nowadays, the theatre has its days counted, having already handed its pedestal over to the cinema, which has become today's "worship art"; the most famous Portuguese director is Filipe La Féria, although much of his art is deemed as commercial. As for the cinema, which in time gathers more and more awards, it is pushing Portugal further and beyond its borders, collecting renowned directors such as Manuel de Oliveira and João Botelho, among others. Among the best of Portuguese contemporary actors are Ruy de Carvalho, Raul Solnado, Eunice Muñoz, and from a later generation, Alexandra Lencastre, José Raposo, Beatriz Batarda, João Villaret, Herman José, Joaquim de Almeida and Maria de Medeiros, some of which had their careers pass through Hollywood.

== Museums ==
- Museu Nacional do Azulejo
- Museu Nacional de Arte Contemporanea
- Berardo Collection Museum
- Museu Calouste Gulbenkian
- Modern Art Centre José de Azeredo Perdigão / Calouste Gulbenkian Foundation
- Serralves Foundation
- Museu Nacional de Arte Antiga
- Museu Nacional dos Coches
- Casa das Historia de Paula Rego
- Museu da Electricidade
- Museu Oriente
- Museu do Chiado
- Museu do Design
- Museu da Electricidade
- Museu do Surrealismo
