= Faculty of Fine Arts of the University of Porto =

Art school in Portugal

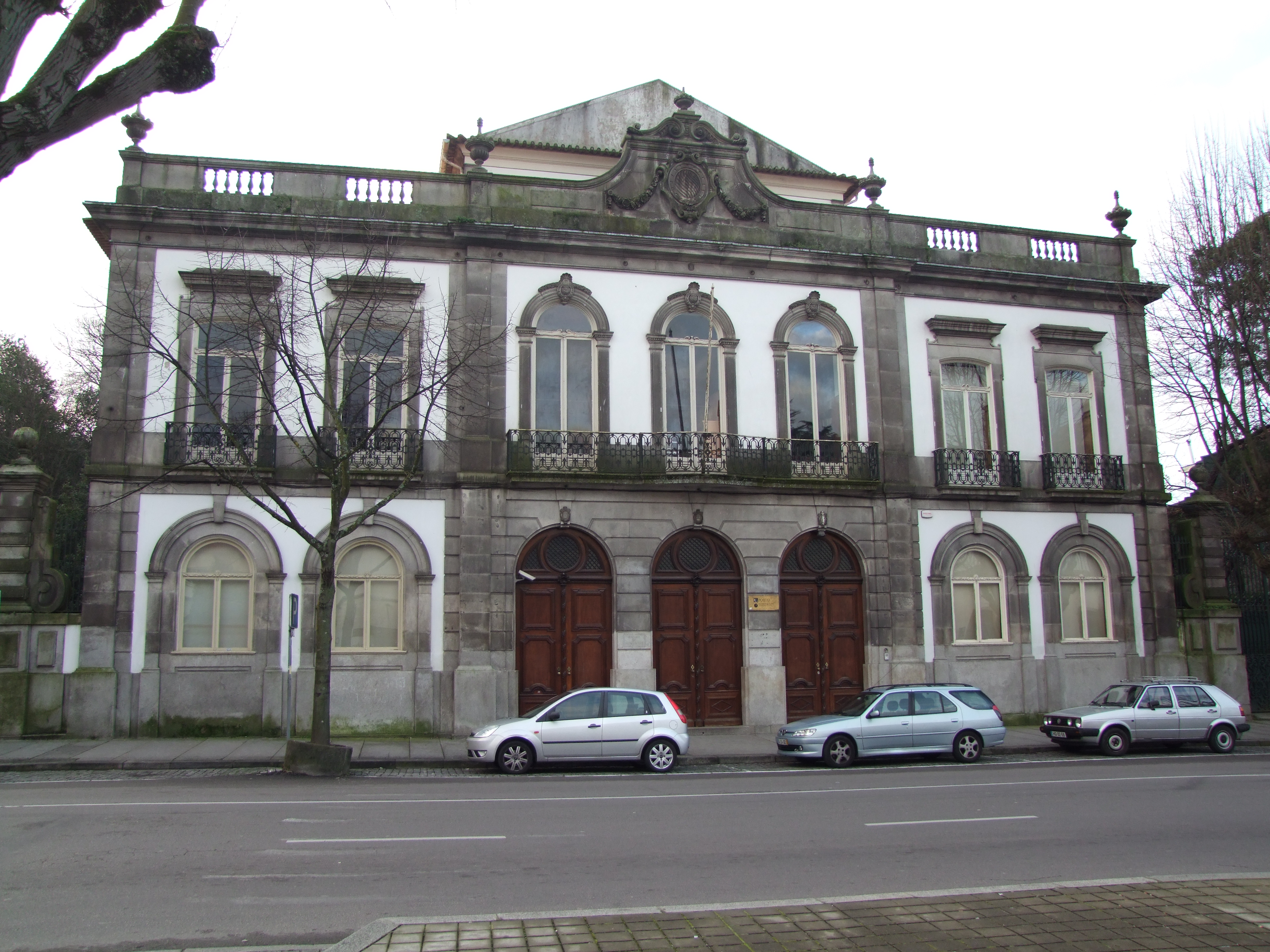

Location
- Av. de Rodrigues de Freitas 265, Porto, 4049–021; Portugal; 41°08′44″N 08°36′03″W

Information
- Established: Porto Academy of Fine Arts, 1836; Porto School of Fine Arts, 1911; Higher School of Fine Arts, 1950; Faculty of Fine Arts of the University of Porto, 1994
- Founder: Maria I of Portugal
- Website: https://www.up.pt/fbaup/pt/

The Faculty of Fine Arts of the University of Porto (Faculdade de Belas-Artes da Universidade do Porto - FBAUP) can trace its roots back to 1780. It has previously been known as the Porto Higher School of Fine Arts (Escola Superior de Belas Artes do Porto) and the Porto Academy of Fine Arts (Academia Portuense de Belas-Artes).

== History ==
Artistic education in Porto began with the establishment of a public drawing and design class initiated in 1780 by a 1779 decree of Queen Maria I. The classes took place in the afternoons at the city's orphanage for boys. This had a particular utilitarian aim of "promoting the study of fine arts, disseminating, and applying its practice to the manufacturing arts". In 1802, when there were already 120 students enrolled, the painter, Vieira Portuense, called this drawing class an "Academy", thus attempting to increase the status of the institution and steer it towards offering a more complete artistic education supported by theoretical studies. However, the desired reform would only take place on 22 November 1836, after the Liberal Revolution and the Portuguese Civil War, with the creation by the Minister of Education, Passos Manuel, of the Porto Academy of Fine Arts, housed in the building of the Convent of Santo António da Cidade. Now under the guidance of João Baptista Ribeiro, founder of the Porto Museum in 1833, the academy offered classes in the areas of painting, sculpture and architecture, and also a preparatory course in drawing. It was open to all children over ten years old.

In 1911, the academy gave rise to the Porto School of Fine Arts, following a reform that reorganized the schools of fine arts in Lisbon and Porto. In 1933, it was installed in the Palacete do Braguinha. From 1950, it became the Higher School of Fine Arts, being then integrated into the national education system. From then, training in ceramics, stained glass, tapestry, engraving, and stonework were introduced.

A communication design course was started in the 1970s. In 1979, the architecture course gained autonomy, becoming part of the University of Porto, as the Faculty of Architecture. In 1994, the Higher School of Fine Arts also became part of the University of Porto and was renamed the Faculty of Fine Arts, occupying the same building as the former school. This is a 19th-century mansion in whose gardens, in the 1950s, buildings of architectural interest were constructed, specifically designed for teaching the traditional fine arts disciplines. Additional land was purchased in 2017.

In 2018, the Faculty elected Lúcia Almeida Matos as the first woman dean, or director, in its history. She served until her retirement in 2025.

The faculty houses Leonardo da Vinci's drawing "Young Woman Washing a Child's Feet", from 1480, a very small work (185 by 114 mm) done in pen and brown ink.

== Teachers ==
Among those to teach at the faculty and its predecessors have been Nadir Afonso, Salvador Barata Feyo, António Carneiro, João António Correia, António Cardoso, Dordio Gomes, Francisco José Resende, Júlio Pomar, António Soares dos Reis, José Rodrigues, and Ângelo de Sousa.
