= António Carneiro =

Portuguese artist (1872–1930)

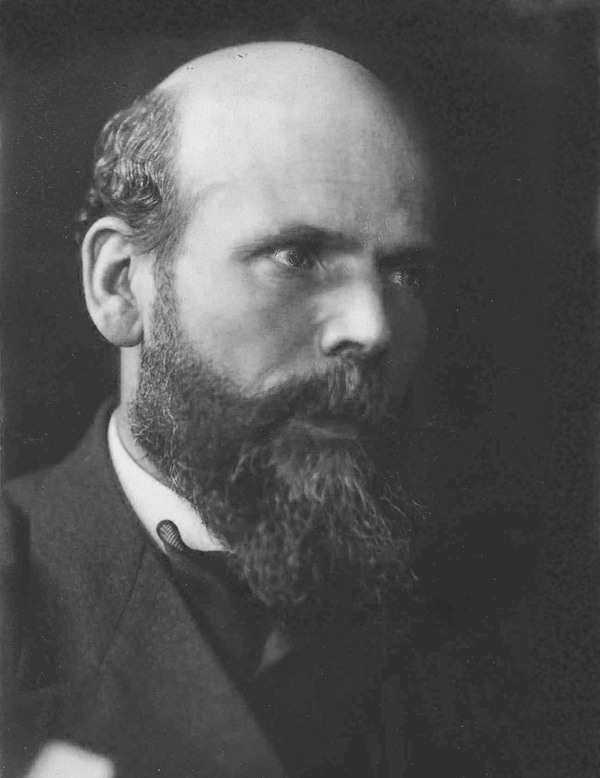
- António Carneiro (1914)
- Born: 16 September 1872; Amarante, Portugal
- Died: 31 March 1930 (aged 57); Porto, Portugal
- Known for: Painting
- Notable work: Media related to António Carneiro at Wikimedia Commons

António Teixeira Carneiro Júnior (16 September 1872 – 31 March 1930) was a Portuguese painter, illustrator, poet and art professor.

== Biography ==
Born into a working-class family, at the age of seven, he was abandoned by his father and lost his mother not long after. In 1879, he was placed in an orphanage operated by the Santa Casa da Misericórdia. It was there that he received his basic education and had his first drawing lessons.

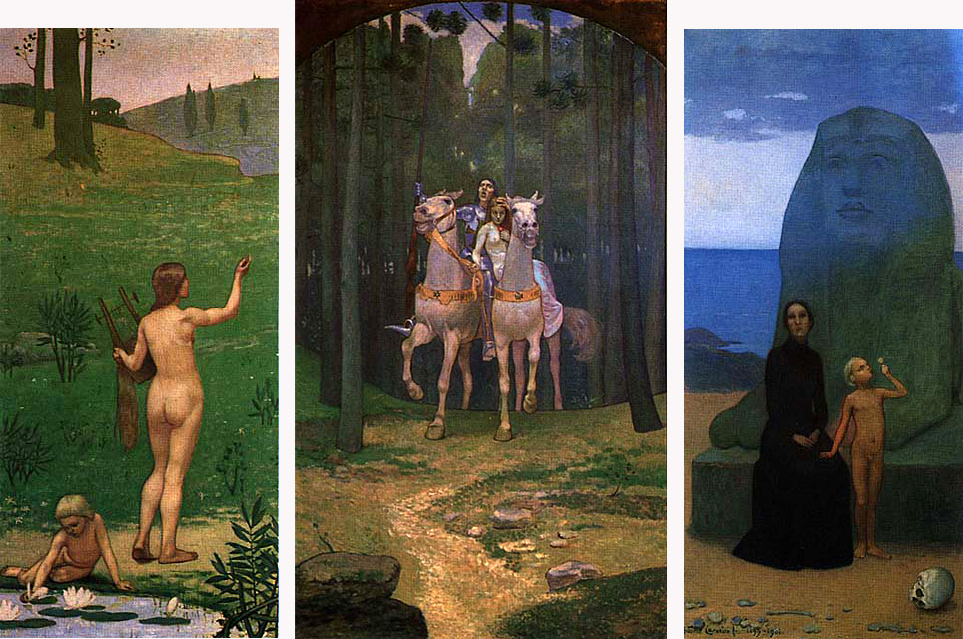
A Vida (Life): Hope, Love, Longing (1900)

His talent was noticed early and thanks to the efforts of his teacher and the school's director, he was able to enroll at the "Escola Superior de Belas-Artes do Porto" in 1884, where he studied with the painter João Marques de Oliveira until 1888. That year, he turned eighteen and left the orphanage, where he took up sculpture with António Soares dos Reis, but returned to painting after Reis' suicide, entering the workshop of João António Correia. In 1891, he wrote his first poems and, two years later, he married. In 1895, he was reunited with his father, who had returned from Brazil.

Two years later, he was able to go to Paris after receiving a scholarship sponsored by António Borges, Marquês da Praia e Monforte. He attended the Académie Julian, studying with Jean-Paul Laurens and Jean-Joseph Benjamin-Constant. In 1900, he won a Silver Medal at the Exposition Universelle for his triptych "Life". He returned to Porto in 1911 and became a teacher at the Escola. Unable to make a living from his art, he took a two-year hiatus to exhibit in Brazil from 1914 to 1916. After his return, he was appointed Chair of the drawing department in 1918.

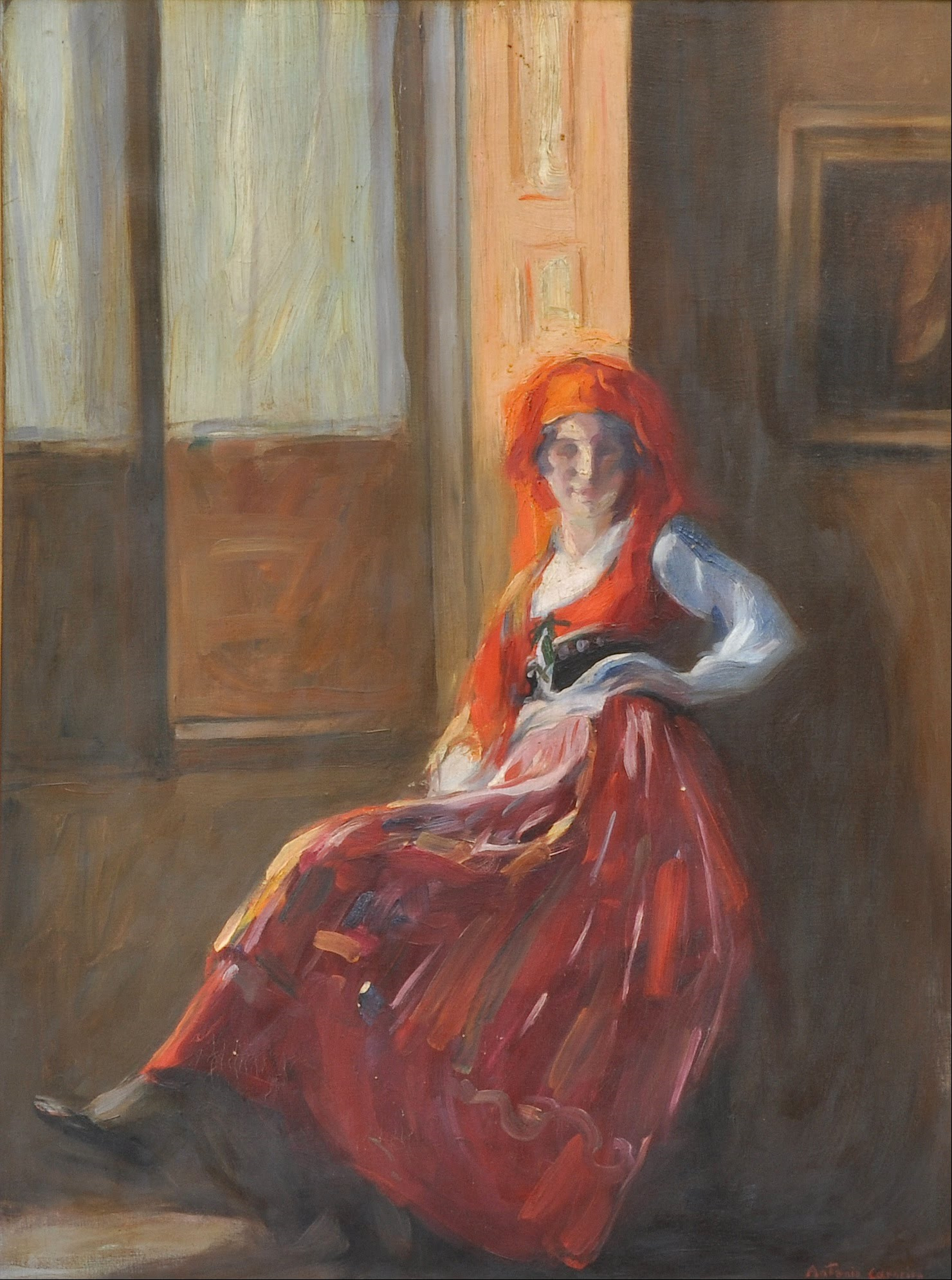
Minhota (Young Lady from Minho) (1917)

During these years, he became a contributor to several magazines, including Atlantida (Atlantis), and joined a new cultural organization called Renascença Portuguesa (Portuguese Renaissance), whose mentor was his friend, the poet Teixeira de Pascoaes; designing their magazine's logo. He also illustrated the works of several authors, including António Correia de Oliveira and João de Deus.

In 1925, the death of his daughter, Josefina, had a significant effect on his work. Despite the emotional effects of that tragedy, he accepted an appointment as director of the Escola in 1929. He never served in that capacity, however, as he was vacationing in Brazil at the time of his appointment and died shortly after his return.

In 1936, his book of poetry, Solilóquios: sonetos póstumos, was published, with an introduction by Júlio Brandão.
