= Lúcia Almeida Matos =

Art professor in Portugal

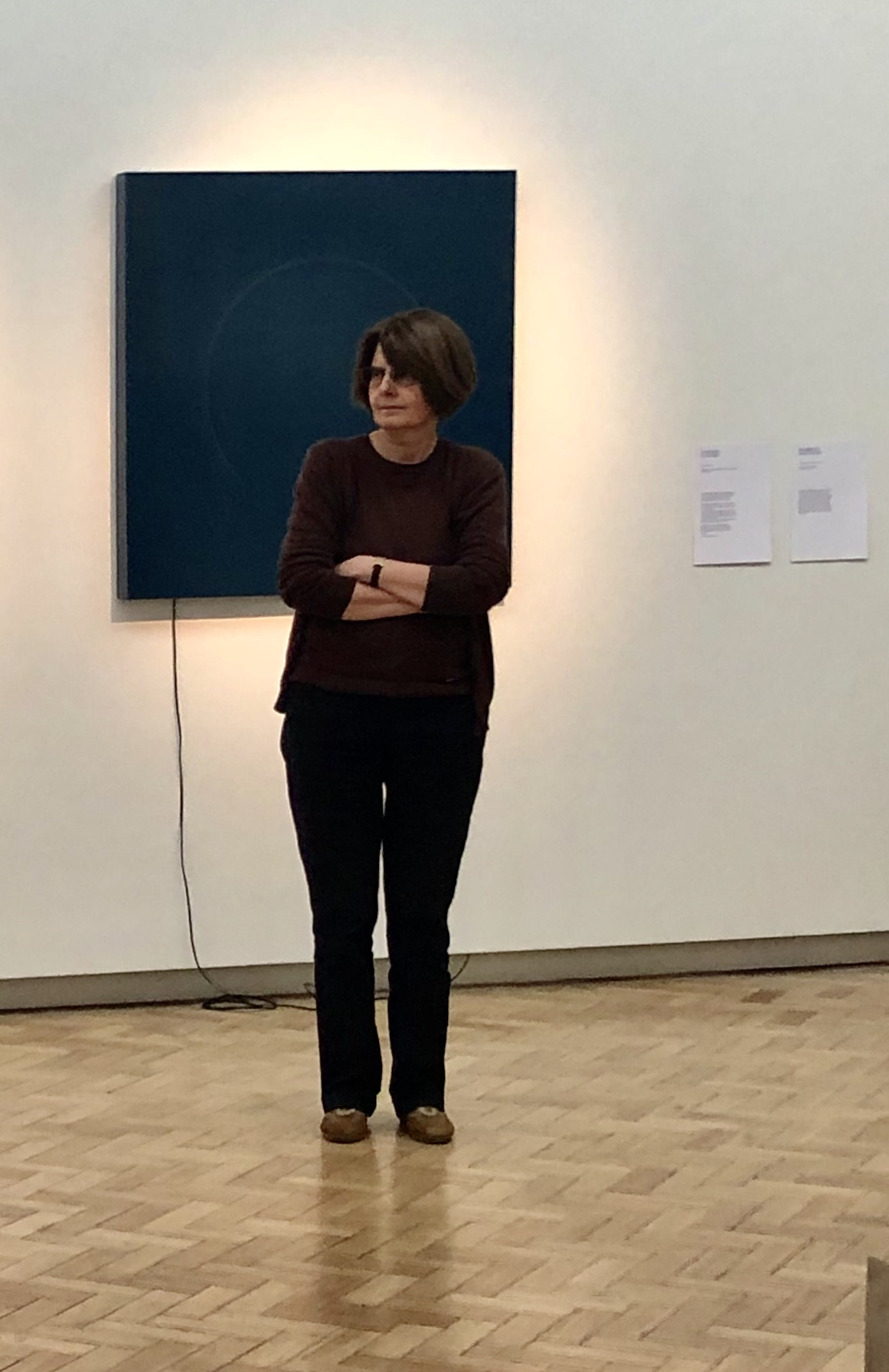
- Matos in 2019
- Born: 1955 (age 70–71); Baden, Switzerland
- Occupation: Professor of art studies
- Years active: 1987–2025
- Known for: Dean of the Faculty of Fine Arts of the University of Porto

Academic background
- Education: Syracuse University, USA (MA); University of Porto, Portugal (PhD)

Academic work
- Main interests: Documentation, conservation, exhibition, and communication of contemporary art

Lúcia Gualdina Marques de Almeida da Silva Matos (born 1955) is a Portuguese retired full professor of art studies. She was the first woman to earn a PhD in art and design from the Faculty of Fine Arts of the University of Porto (FBAUP), and the first woman to be elected dean of the FBAUP, in 2018. Her research interests have focused on the documentation, conservation, exhibition, and communication of contemporary art.

== Early life and education ==
Matos was born in Baden, Switzerland in 1955. She obtained a degree in philosophy from the Faculty of Arts and Humanities of the University of Porto. In 1979 she took Master's level courses in the Department of Art History at Syracuse University in New York State, USA and in 1983 she obtained a Master of Arts degree from the Fine Arts Department of the same university, with the thesis Aurélia de Souza: a Provincial Woman Artist of Portugal: 1866–1922. In 2003 she became the first woman to receive a PhD in art and design from the FBAUP, with a thesis on Sculpture in Portugal in the 20th Century (1910–1969). Academicism, Modernisms and Avant-gardes.

== Career ==
Matos became a professor at the University of Porto in 1987, teaching courses in modern and contemporary art history and art criticism, and contributing to the merger of the then Higher School of Fine Arts into the university to form the Faculty of Fine Arts. From 1996, she was the scientific coordinator of the FBAUP museum, and was responsible, among many other exhibitions, for the 2019 exhibition on the 500th anniversary of Leonardo da Vinci's death, of his drawing Young Woman Washing a Child's Feet, which is in the collection of FBAUP. As the scientific coordinator she initiated a design collection, promoting new acquisitions, disseminating, and providing digital access to the collections, and communicating with the public, particularly through the programming of the FBAUP's exhibition pavilion.

She was the director of the Soares dos Reis National Museum in Porto between 1999 and 2001, assisting with its expansion and its re-opening in 2001. In 2000 she was on the executive committee of Porto 2001, when Porto was a European Capital of Culture. Her research interests have focused on the documentation, conservation, exhibition, and communication of contemporary art, with an emphasis on strategies for its conservation and on the use of digital tools for access to and knowledge of art and design practices. She has researched and given talks on many artists, with a priority for female artists.

From 2006, she developed and then coordinated the Master's programme in art studies and museology, and also taught courses for the bachelor's degree in visual arts at FBAUP. In November 2018 she became the first woman to be the dean of FBAUP, being re-elected in 2022 and serving in that capacity until her mandatory retirement in 2025. Matos has also been a researcher at the Institute of Art History (IHA) of NOVA University in Lisbon, where she collaborated in the creation of the Museum Studies (MuSt) research group.

== Publications ==
Among her published works are:

- The Monument of Boavista: Sculpture, Architecture and Urban Space (1908–1952); published by Fundação Instituto Arquiteto José Marques da Silva (2013).
- Diário de um Estudante de Belas Artes. Afrontamento (2013)
- O Monumento da Boavista / The Boavista Monument. Afrontamento (2012)
- Sculpture in Portugal in the 20th Century (1910–1969); published by the Calouste Gulbenkian Foundation (2007).
- Landscapes, with Laura Castro. Afrontamento (2007).
