= Self-Portrait in a Red Coat =

Painting by Aurélia de Sousa (c. 1900)

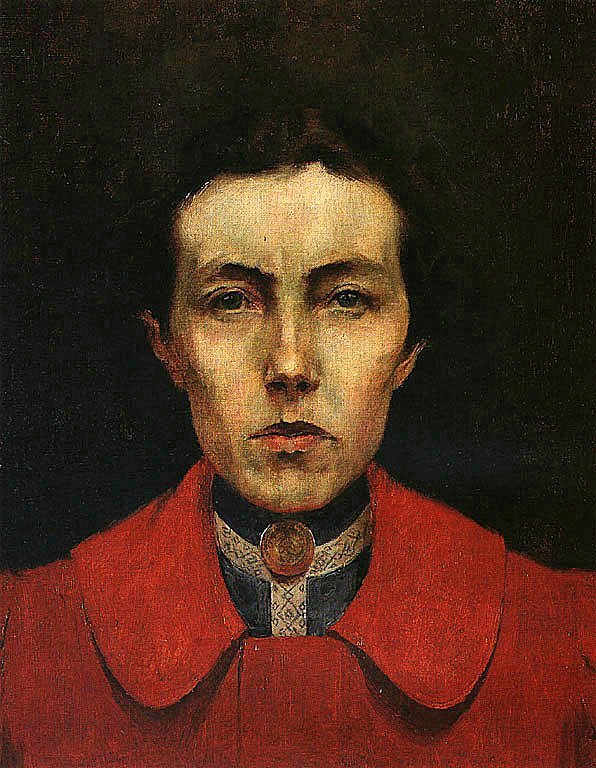

Self-Portrait in a Red Coat (Portuguese: Autorretrato) is an oil on canvas painting by the Portuguese painter Aurélia de Souza (1866–1922). Painted around 1900 in Paris, it measures 45 cm high by 36 cm wide. One of the most recognised of paintings by a Portuguese woman artist, it is held in the collection of the Soares dos Reis National Museum in Porto.

== History ==
De Souza painted several self-portraits during her life. They are usually identified by the features that accompany the portrait. For example, this portrait is known, for obvious reasons, as the red-coat self-portrait, while also well known are her Self-Portrait with Black Ribbon, and the Saint Anthony self-portrait in which she dresses as the saint.

Over the years the painting has undergone a reassessment. No photograph exists of it prior to 1936, when it occupied an insignificant place in an exhibition of De Souza's work held in the Fine Arts Salon of the Palácio de Cristal in Porto. Within the same exhibition, the painting Self-Portrait with Black Ribbon occupied a dominant position. By 2021, however, when the Calouste Gulbenkian Foundation organized an exhibition of Portuguese women's art from 1900 to 2020, called All I Want (Tudo O Que Eu Quero), the red-coat self-portrait appeared on the cover of the catalogue, together with a 1997 painting by Helena Almeida. In 2022, at an exhibition of De Souza’s work in the Soares dos Reis National Museum, reproductions of the painting were available for purchase in the museum shop, as were household items bearing its image. The catalogue cover was of the self-portrait. According to the museum, the artwork now attracts international recognition. It is characterized as an asset of "national interest that merits special protection".

== Description ==
The widespread recognition that the painting now has, over a century after it was produced, can to a certain extent be attributed to the greater availability of colour photographs in magazines and newspapers and, more recently, the growth of the internet. The vibrant red colour of the coat now attracts the attention the painting did not receive before colour photography, enabling observers to appreciate the way it defied late-19th century conventions and the fact that it was advanced for its time. De Souza's oval face is positioned at the exact centre of the composition and the contrast of her pale face with the red coat makes it appear as a mask. It is known that De Souza did use photographs to prepare for her painting and it is possible that she followed that practice for this self-portrait. Indeed, the historian, Filipa Lowndes Vicente, has speculated on whether her self-portraits would have been possible before the invention of photography. In the painting, she wears a suffocating collar, similar to her other self-portraits. The eye is attracted to the design of the collar and the broach she wears, making her neck the focal point of the painting.

== Appreciation ==
In his book, Art in Portugal in the 19th Century, José-Augusto França considers it to be one of the "greatest portraits that Portuguese painting has offered us to this day – the most beautiful self-portrait in Portuguese painting". In the catalogue of the exhibition From Drawing from Nature: An Inquiry into the Portuguese Portrait, held at the National Museum of Ancient Art in Lisbon in 2018, Anísio Franco refers to De Souza's painting as "the most disturbing and unusual self-portrait in universal painting". Maria João Lello Ortigão de Oliveira (2006) commented on the "disturbing strangeness contained in the universe of a single gaze, [to which] no one has yet been able to answer".
