= Ângelo de Sousa =

Portuguese artist (1938–2011)

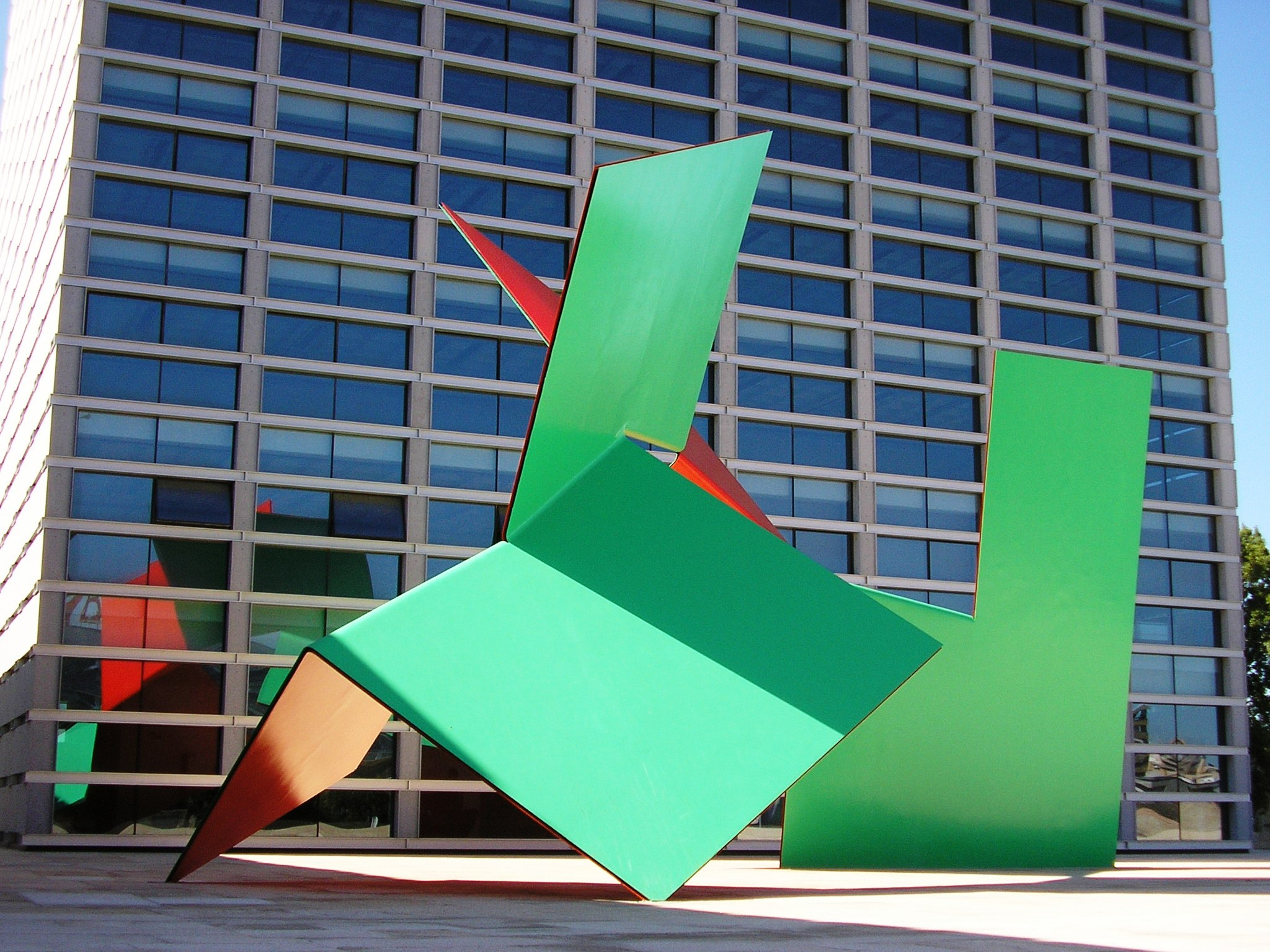
- Iron sculpture by Ângelo de Sousa at Boavista Avenue, Porto, with 14m in length by 8m high.
- Born: 2 February 1938; Lourenço Marques, Portuguese Mozambique
- Died: 29 March 2011 (aged 73); Porto, Portugal

Ângelo César Cardoso de Sousa (2 February 1938 – 29 March 2011) was a Portuguese painter, sculptor, draftsman and professor, better known for continuously experimenting with new techniques in his works. He was seen as a scholar of light and colour who explored minimalism in new radical ways.

He was born in Lourenço Marques (now Maputo) in 1938 and in 1955 he moved to Porto where he enrolled in the School of Fine Artes. It was there that he received his degree in painting with the highest mark, 20. His academic excellence led him, along with Armando Alves, Jorge Pinheiro and José Rodrigues, to become part of a group known as "Os Quatro Vintes" (Portuguese for "The Four Twenties").

Ângelo de Sousa lived and worked in Porto, where he lectured in the School of Fine Arts (now the Faculty of Fine Arts of the University of Porto) from 1962 until 2000, when he retired as a full professor. Prior to teaching, de Sousa had his first solo exhibition in 1959 and since then his works have been exhibited internationally.

In 1975 he received the International Prize of the 13th São Paulo Art Biennial and in 2007 the Calouste Gulbenkian Foundation presented him with the Gulbenkian Prize.

Some of his drawings illustrate books by Eugénio de Andrade, Maria Alzira Seixo, Mário Cláudio, Fiama Hasse Pais Brandão, amongst others.

He died in his home, at the age of 73, from cancer.
