= José Júlio de Souza Pinto =

Portuguese painter (1856–1939)

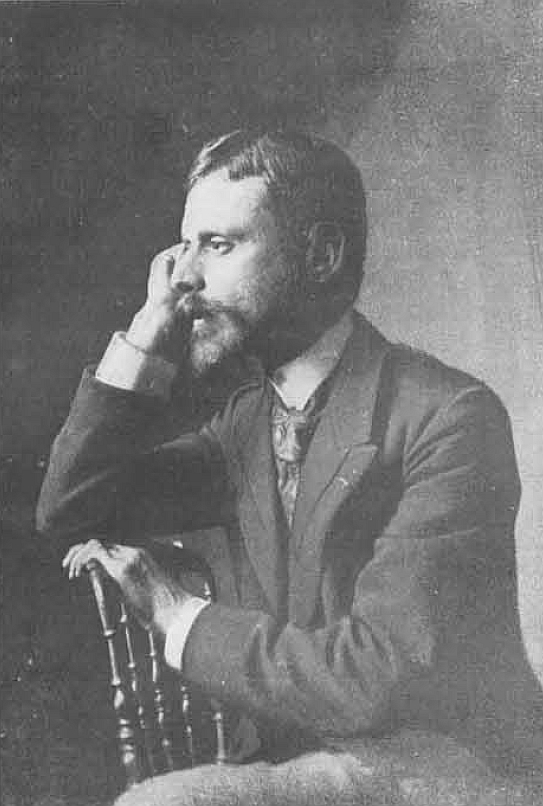
- José Júlio de Souza Pinto. From the Revista Moderna (1889)
- Born: 15 September 1856; Angra do Heroísmo, Azores, Portugal
- Died: 14 April 1939 (aged 82); Pont-Scorff, France
- Known for: Painting
- Notable work: Media related to José Júlio de Souza Pinto at Wikimedia Commons
- Movement: Naturalism

Signature
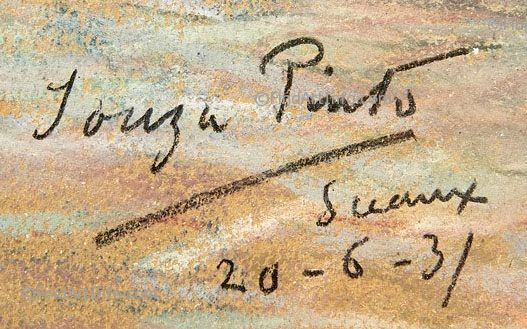

José Júlio de Souza Pinto (15 September 1856 – 14 April 1939) was a Portuguese painter in the naturalist style.

== Life and work ==
He was born in Angra do Heroísmo, in Terceira island, Azores, the son of a doctor. He lived in the islands of Terceira, Santa Maria and São Miguel Island, until the age of fourteen. Later, he lived in Porto, where he studied at the Escola Superior de Belas-Artes with António Soares dos Reis and João António Correia. In 1880, after graduating, he and fellow student Henrique Pousão travelled to Paris on a fellowship.

Once there, he obtained a position in the studios of Alexandre Cabanel, studying with William-Adolphe Bouguereau and Adolphe Yvon at the École des Beaux-Arts. He quickly became integrated into Parisian artistic circles and placed works at all the major exhibitions, including the Salon. By 1900, he was a member of the judging panel at the Salon. Eventually, he also presented his works in Brazil and the United States.

He made frequent visits to Portugal, where he exhibited in Porto and Lisbon, and he was the first Portuguese artist to have his work displayed in the Musée du Luxembourg (now in the Musée d'Orsay). On a visit to Brittany, he became enamoured of the southern coast and lived there for the remainder of his life, painting genre scenes of the local people and villages. He died at Pont-Scorff.

== Selected paintings ==
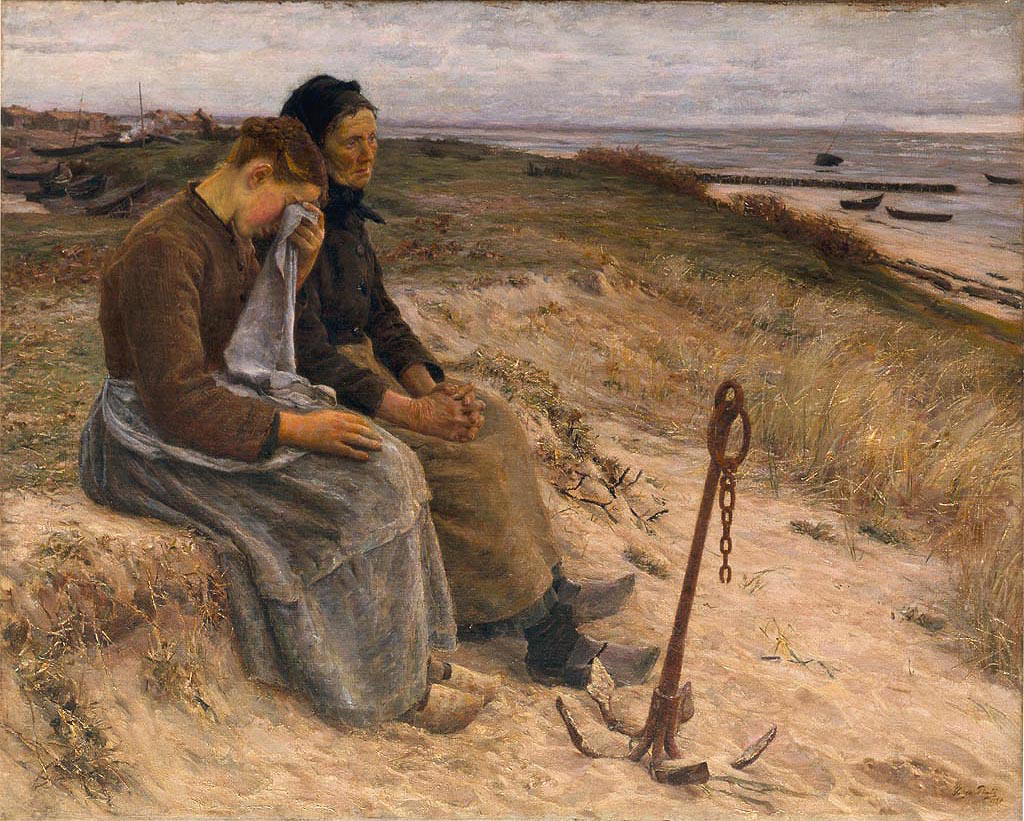
The Missing Ship (1901)

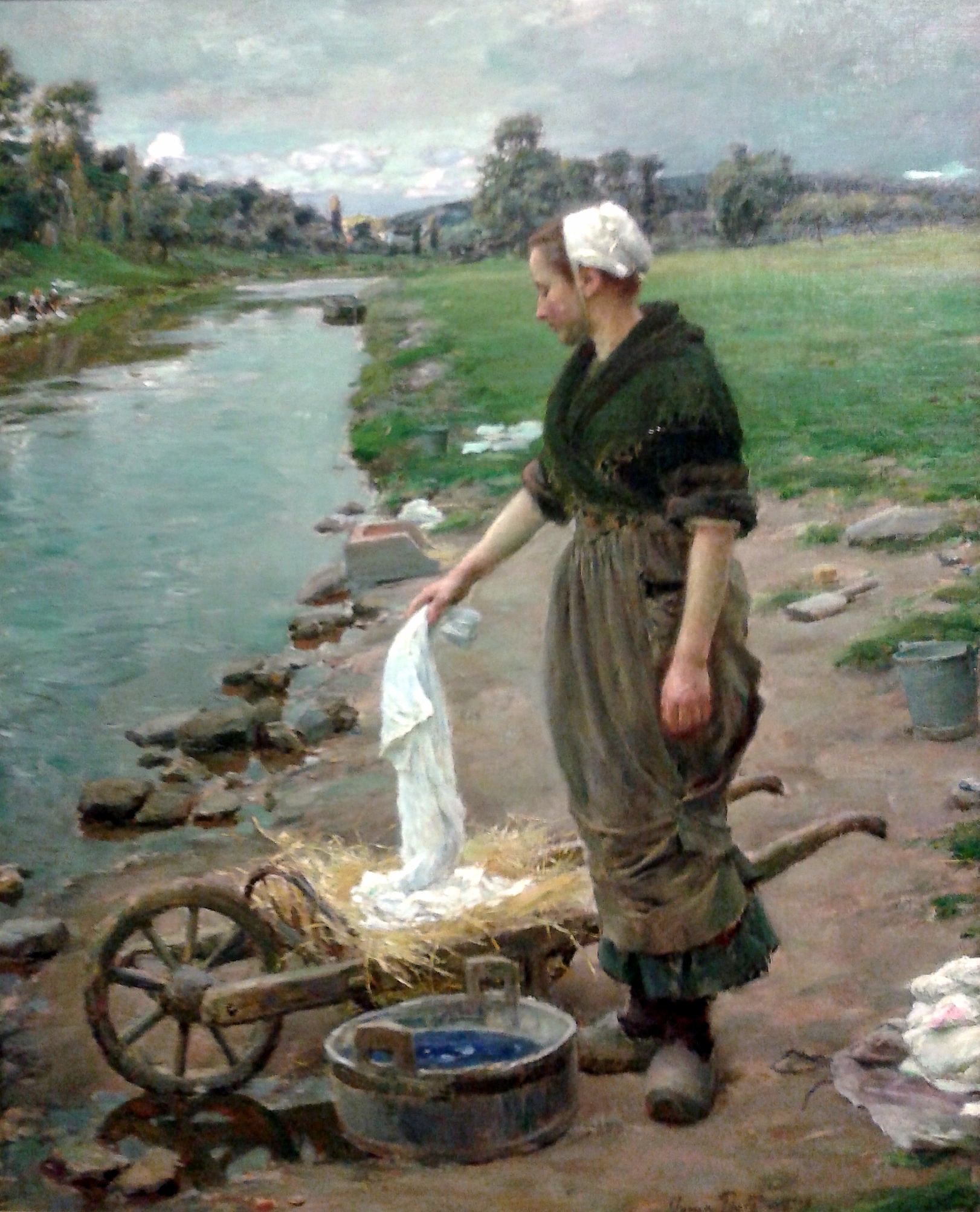
The Blue Bucket (1907)

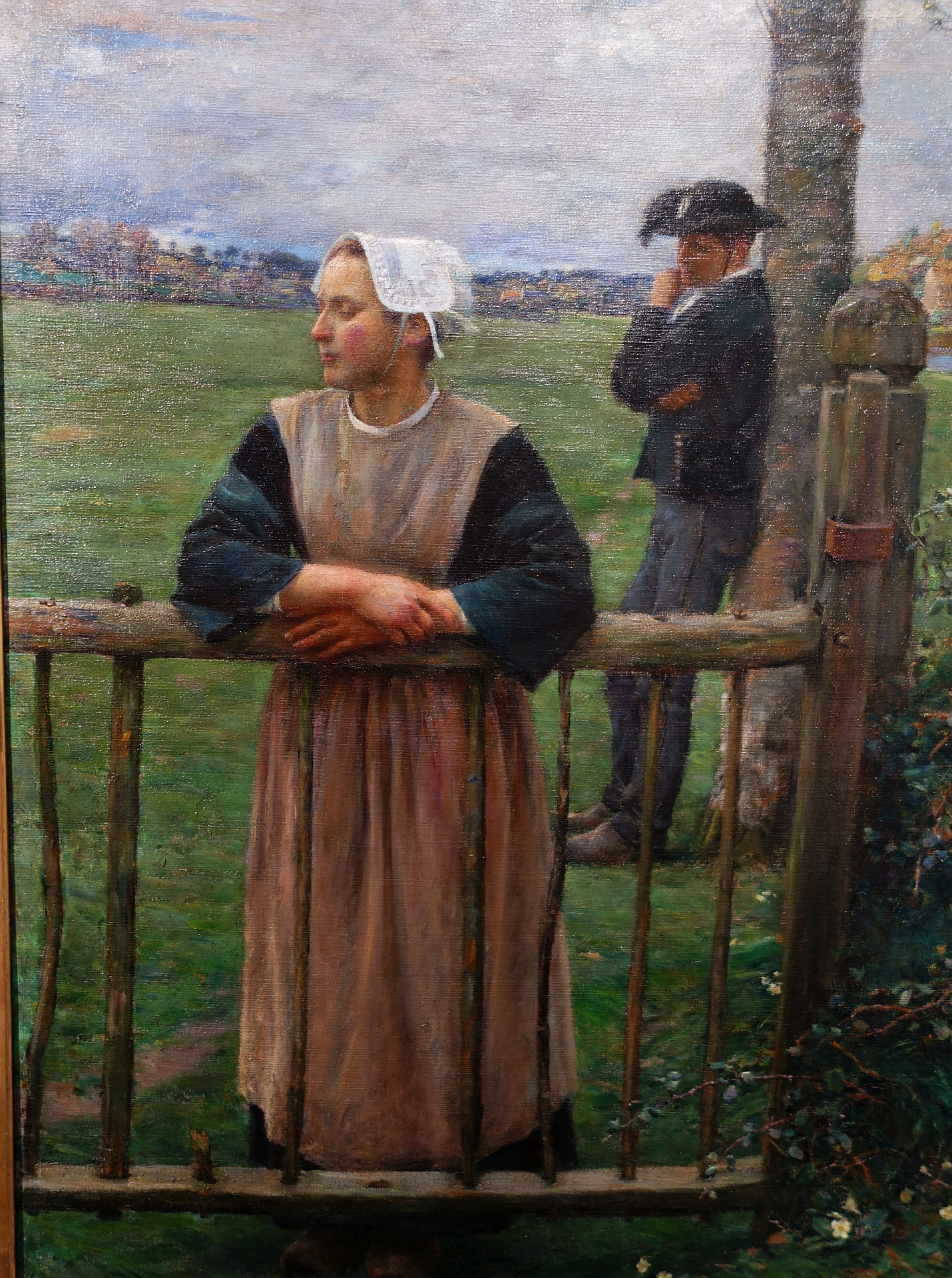
The Sulking Girl (1906)

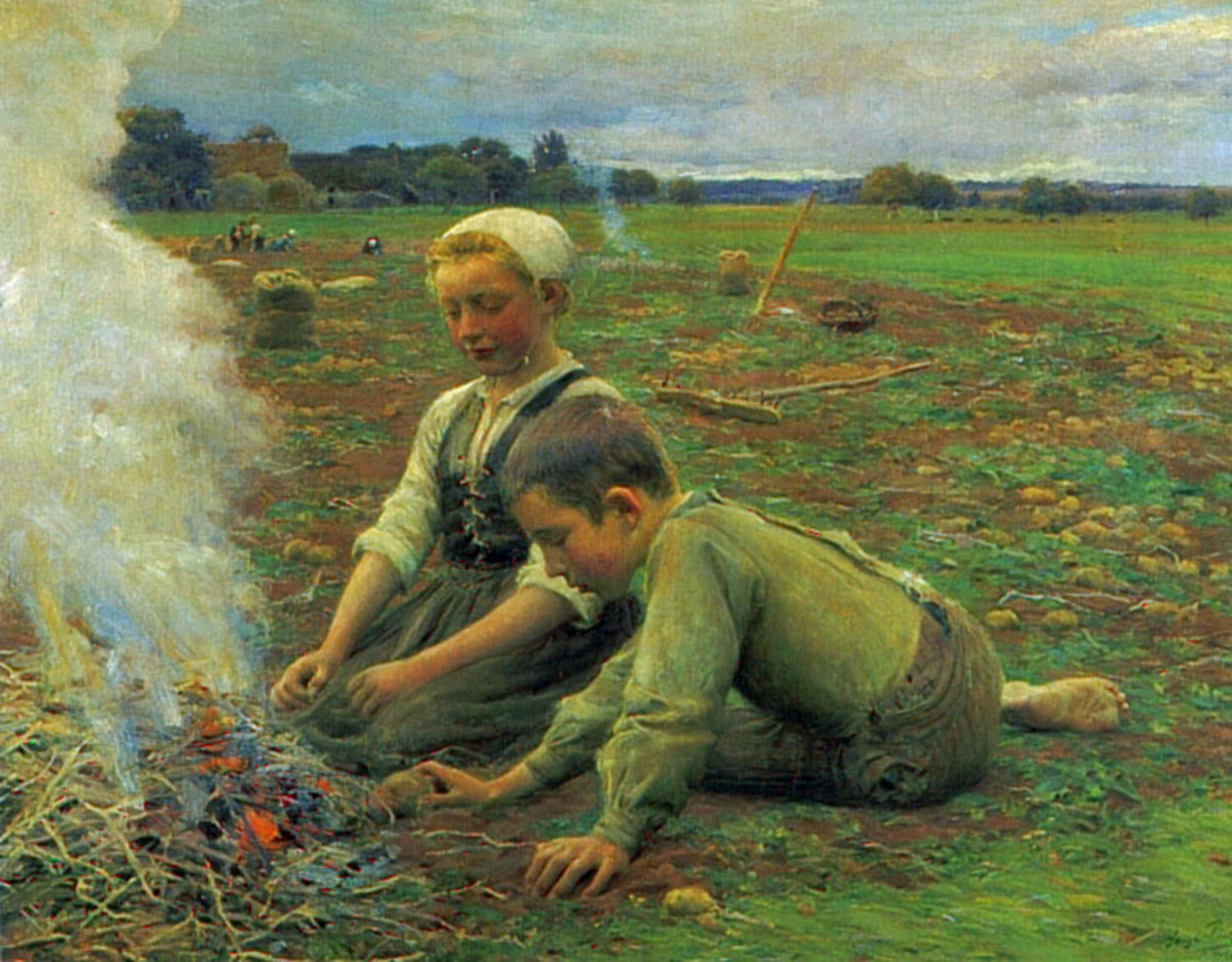
Harvesting Potatoes (1898)
