= Henrique Pousão =

Portuguese painter (1859–1884)

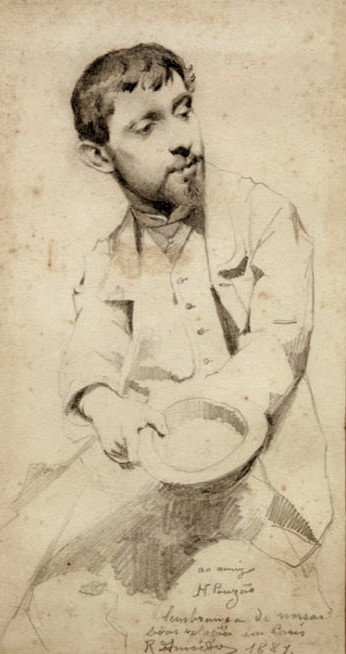
- Henrique Pousão (1881), in a drawing by Rodolfo Amoedo
- Born: Henrique César de Araújo Pousão; 1 January 1859; Vila Viçosa, Portugal
- Died: 20 March 1884 (aged 25); Vila Viçosa
- Known for: Painting
- Notable work: Media related to Henrique Pousão at Wikimedia Commons
- Movement: Naturalism

Henrique César de Araújo Pousão (Vila Viçosa, 1 January 1859 - Vila Viçosa, 20 March 1884) was a Portuguese painter.

== Life ==
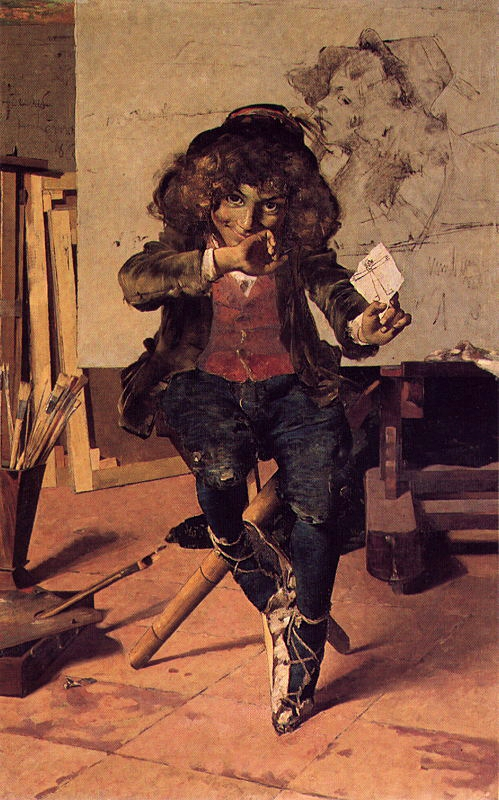
Waiting for Success (1882)

Henrique Pousão was the son of a judge, from a wealthy family of Alentejo. His early talent manifested at the age of ten, when he copied a portrait of Rubens. In 1872 he enrolled in the Fine Arts Academy of Porto, graduating in 1879 with excellent grades and numerous prizes.

After graduation, Pousão travelled to France with fellow student José Júlio de Souza Pinto and studied at the École des Beaux-arts in Paris under Adolphe Yvon and Alexandre Cabanel. But he suffered from tuberculosis, and under his doctor's advice left Paris for Italy, hoping that the warmer climate might relieve his condition. In 1882 he established a studio in Rome on the Via dei Portoghesi, moving later to Naples and Capri. Some of his major works were painted during his time in Italy. In 1884, still unwell, he returned to Portugal, where he died that year.

== Work ==
Pousão belonged to the naturalist generation, like António Silva Porto and João Marques de Oliveira, though his work is more related than theirs to impressionism. In Paris he appears to have been influenced by Manet, especially in his use of black in equal proportion to other colours. Some critics have seen in his landscape works, rendered in a looser, expressive style, a prelude to modern art and abstraction. This approach appears in the abstract plains of colour and textures of his 1882 paintings Miragem and Fachada de Porta Soterrada. Some of his best works were painted on small wood panels no bigger than 100mm x 160mm in a poetic, luminous style. The best collection of his work is at the National Museum Soares dos Reis, in Porto, which houses Paisagem - Saint-Sauves (Landscape, St Sauves); The model resting; Senhora Vestida de Negro (Lady in Black); Autoretrato; Un patio; Escadas de um pardieiro (Stairs to a barn), Roma; Ramada e muro com vasos (Trellis and vases on a low wall) and Rapariga deitada no tronco de uma árvore (Girl lying on a tree trunk), 1883. More paintings on Arts and Culture (Google).

== Gallery ==
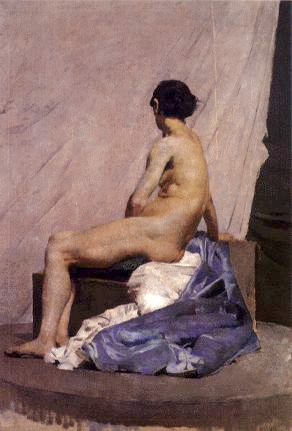
Model painting (1880)

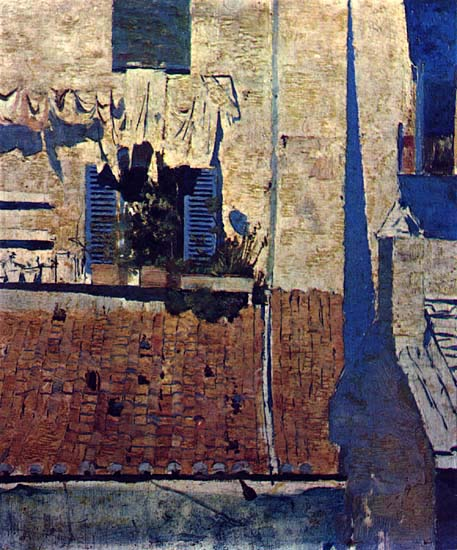
Shutters (1883)

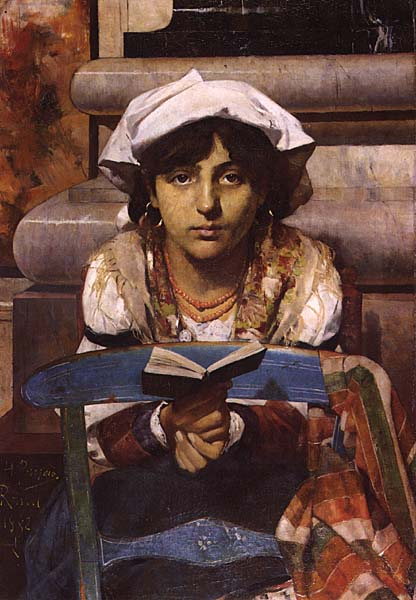
Cecilia (1882)

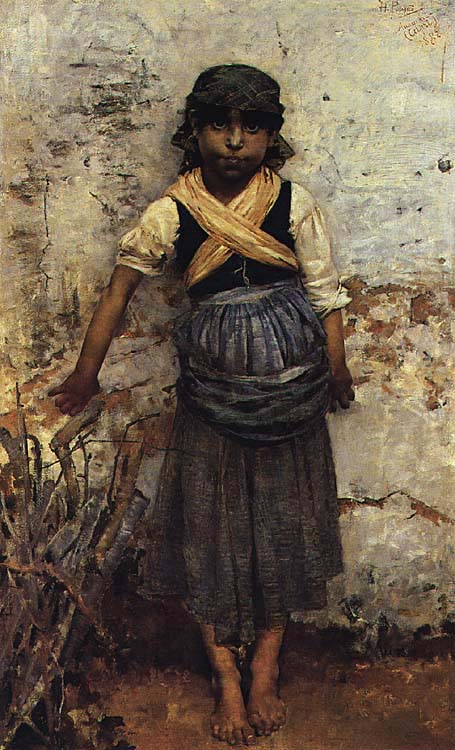
Tired (1882)

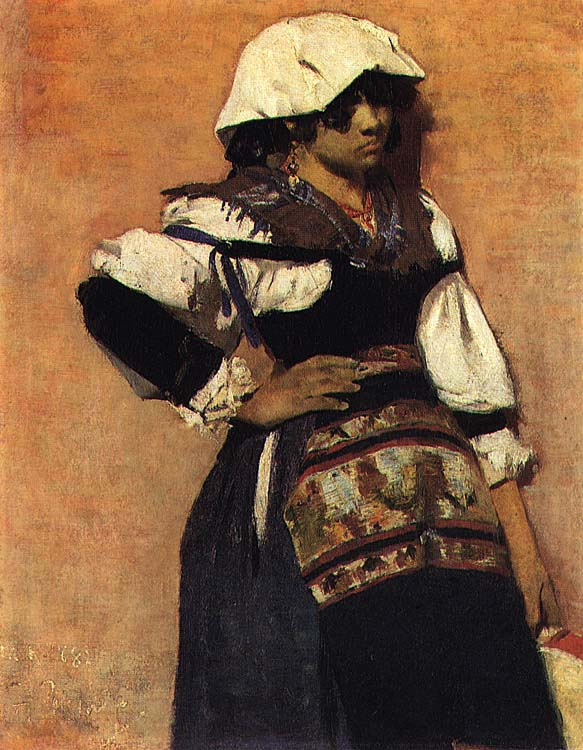
Neapolitan (1882)

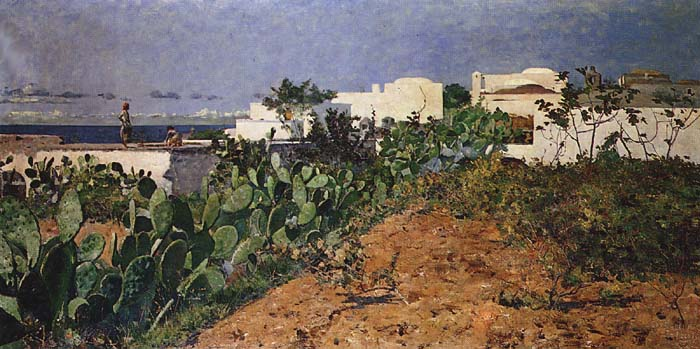
White Houses (1882)

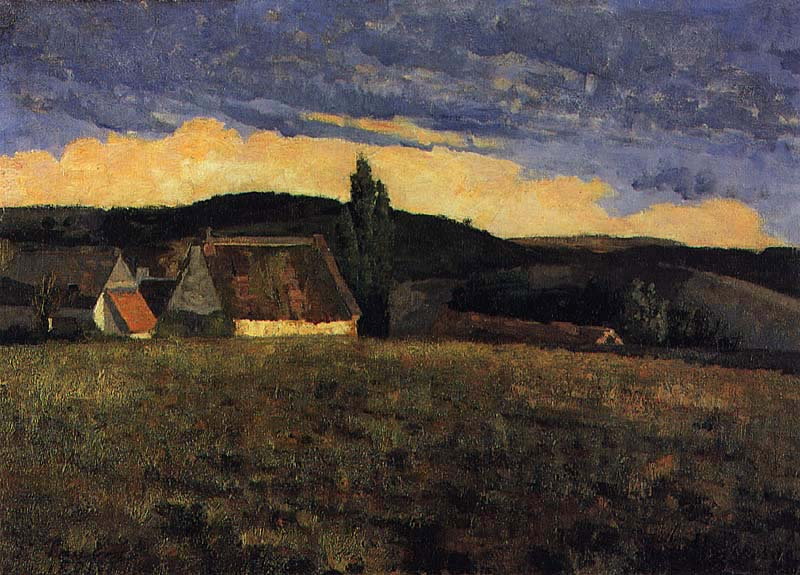
St.Sauves (1881)

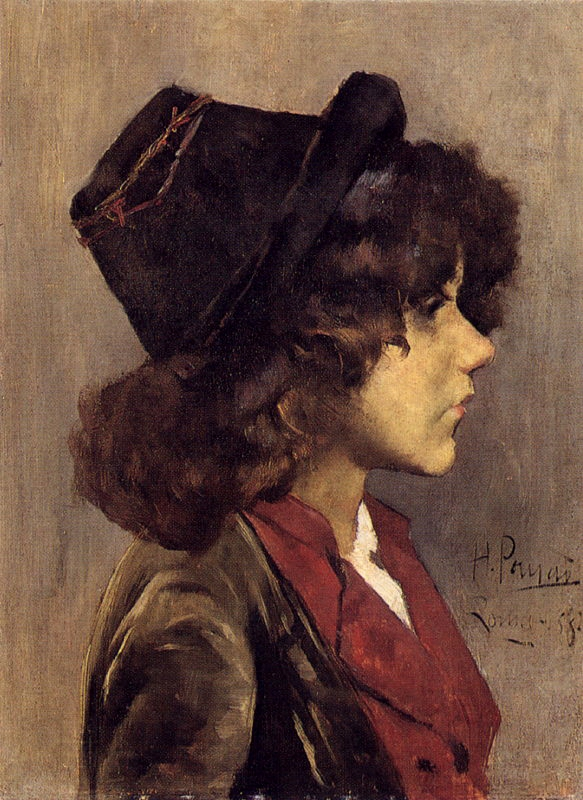
Neapolitan Boy (1880s)
