= João António Correia =

Portuguese painter and professor

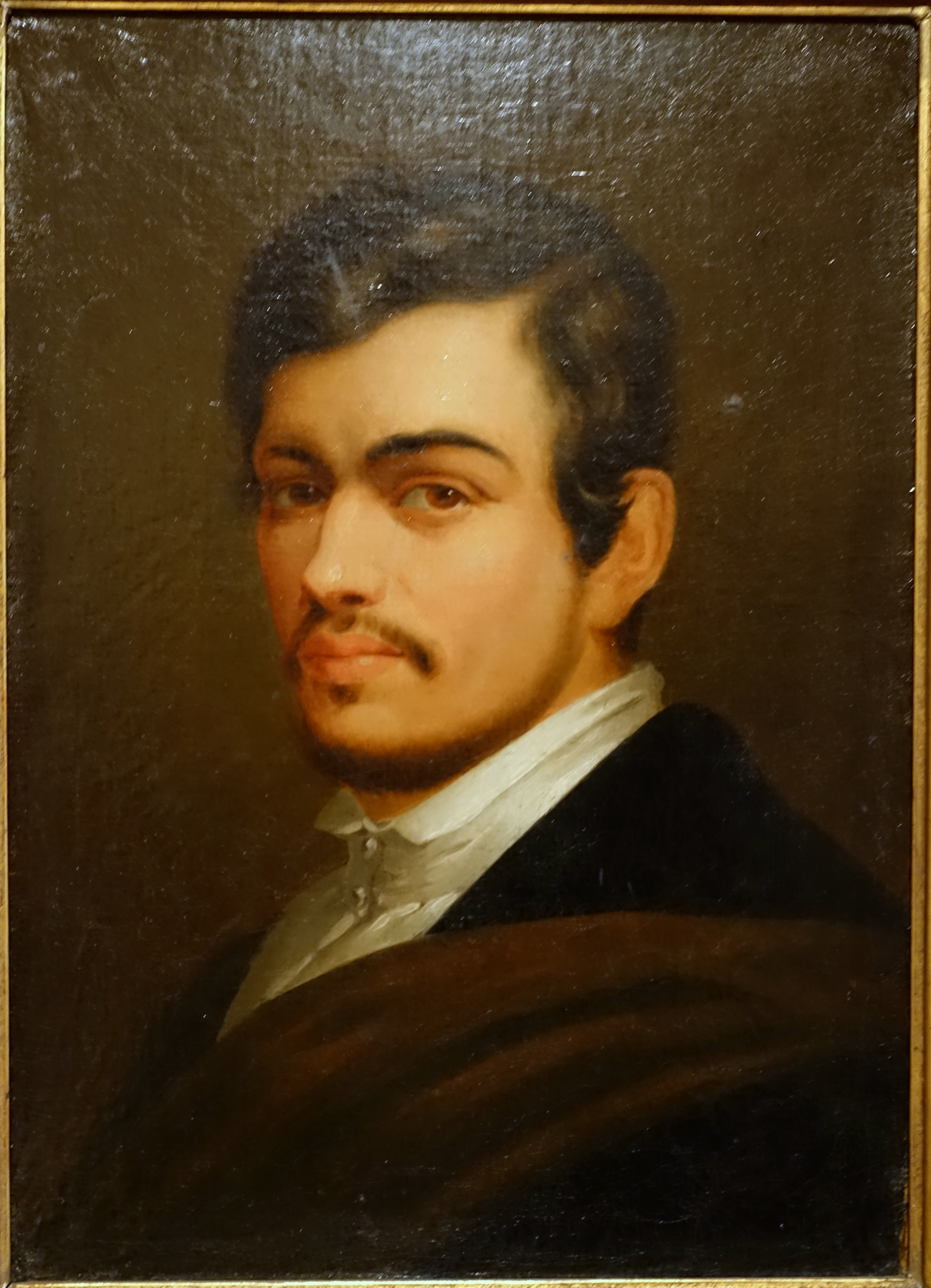
- Self-portrait (before 1863)
- Born: 26 December 1822; Porto, Portugal
- Died: 16 March 1896 (aged 73); Porto, Portugal

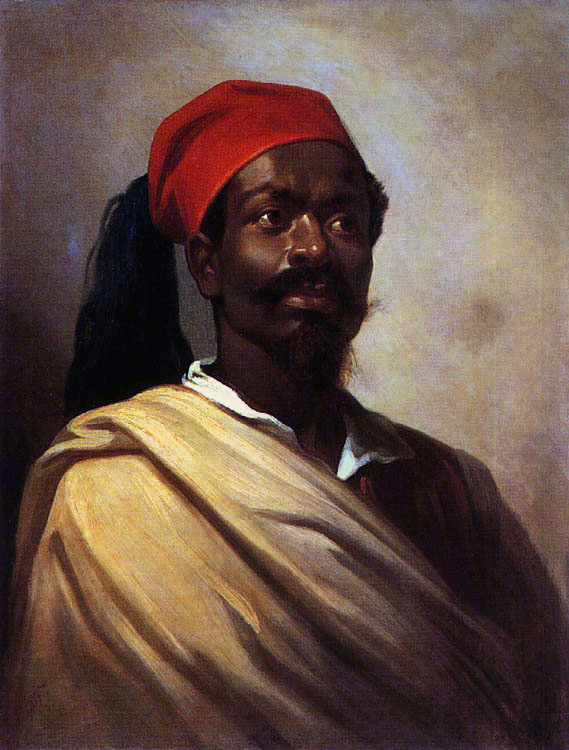
The Negro (1869), his most familiar work.

João António Correia (26 December 1822 – 16 March 1896) was a Portuguese painter and art professor.

== Biography ==
His father was a textile merchant. He enrolled at the "Academia Real de Marinha e Comércio", taking the course in design from 1836 to 1838. The following year, he began to study mathematics, but continued with designing and received an award for his print of "Venus Binding the Wings of Love". During this time, he also took classes in history painting, perspective and anatomy at the Escola Superior de Belas-Artes do Porto (now part of the University of Porto), winning honors at the first triennial exposition in 1842.

He was then able to study in Paris, thanks to a subscription taken up for him by a civic group in Porto. There, he lived with the painter Théodore Chassériau, who helped him prepare for the competition at the École des Beaux-Arts, which he probably attended, although he may have studied privately.

On his return to Portugal in 1851, he was named Deputy Professor for history painting at the Academy in Porto. He became a full Professor six years later and introduced the practice of painting from live nude models. Later, he served as Director of the Academy, from 1882 until his death. Among his best-known students were António Soares dos Reis, João Marques de Oliveira, António Silva Porto, Henrique Pousão and Artur Loureiro.

He was also well known as a portrait painter and executed several religious murals for the Church of Saint Ildefonso and other local churches. He willed his works to the Academy, but they were actually auctioned off and dispersed.
