= Count of Almedina =

Noble title in the Kingdom of Portugal

Count of Almedina is a Portuguese title of nobility created on 13 April 1882 by Luís I of Portugal.

1. Delfim Deodato Guedes, 1st Count of Almedina
2. Luísa Guimarães Guedes, 2nd Countess of Almedina
3. Alda de Guimarães Guedes, 3rd Countess of Almedina
4. José Guedes Pinto Machado, 4th Count of Almedina
5. José Frederico Mayer Pinto Machado, 5th Count of Almedina
