= Fiama Hasse Pais Brandão =

Fiama Hasse Pais Brandão (15 August 1938 – 19 January 2007) was a Portuguese poet, dramatist, translator and essayist.

== Life ==
Born in Lisbon, she lived in Carcavelos until the age of 18. She was educated at St. Julian's School and studied German philology at the University of Lisbon. She worked as a theatre critic and translated works from German, English and French literature. She also did historical and literary research on the Portuguese 16th century. In 1974, she was one of the founders of the "Teatro Hoje" theatre company. and directed Garcia Lorca’s ‘Marina Pineda’ there.

Her first book, Em Cada Pedra Um Voo Imóvel, was published in 1958. In 1961 she participated in the collective publication Poesia 61, together with Gastão Cruz, Casimiro de Brito, Luiza Neto Jorge and Maria Teresa Horta. She was married to Gastão Cruz.

Some of her most admired works appeared late in her life, including Epístolas e memorandos (1996) and Cenas vivas (2000). Both in 1996 and 2000, Fiama Hasse Pais Brandão was distinguished with the Portuguese Writers Association's Poetry Prize.

== Works ==
Poetry:

- Morfismos (1961)
- Barcas Novas (1967)
- Novas visões do passado (1975)
- Homenagemàliteratura (1976)
- F de Fiama (1986)
- Três Rostos (1989)
- Movimento Perpétuo (1992)
- Epístolas e Memorandos (1996)
- Cenas Vivas (2000)
- As Fábulas (2002)

Theatre:

- Os Chapéus de Chuva (1961)
- A Campanha (1965)
- Quem Move as Árvores (1979)
- Teatro-Teatro (1990)

Prose:

- Em Cada Pedra Um Voo Imóvel (1958)
- Movimento Perpétuo (1991)
- Sob o Olhar de Medeia (1998)

Essay:

- O Labirinto Camoniano e Outros Labirintos (1985)

English translations:

- In Contemporary Portuguese Poetry (Carcanet Press,1988)
- In Literary Olympians (USA,1997)
- In Anthology of Magazine Verse (USA, 1997)
