= Aurélia de Souza =

Portuguese artist (1866–1922)

Aurélia de Sousa
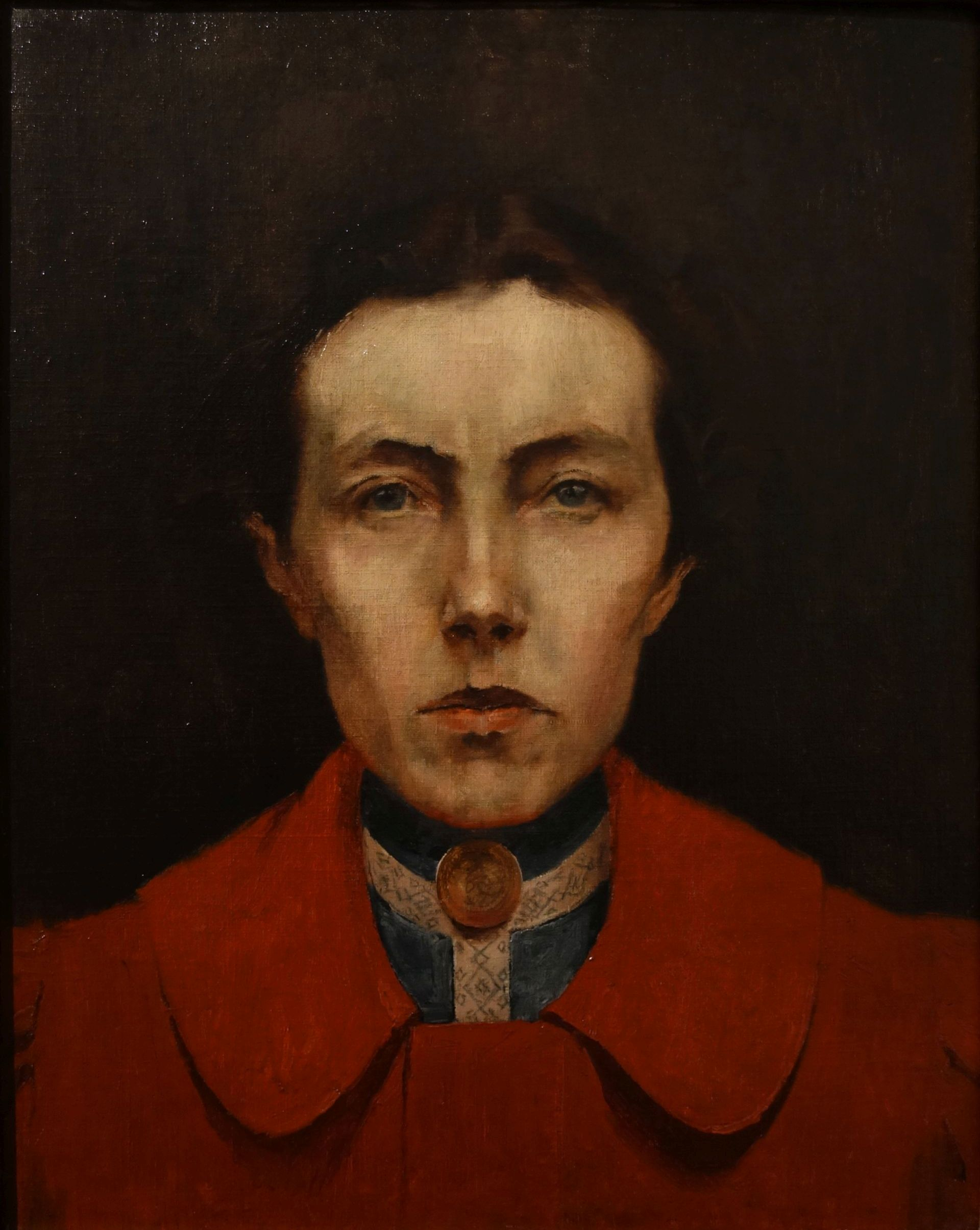
- Self-portrait, c. 1900
- Born: June 13, 1866; Valparaíso, Chile
- Died: May 26, 1922 (aged 55); Porto, Portugal
- Education: Fine-Arts Academy of Porto
- Known for: Painting

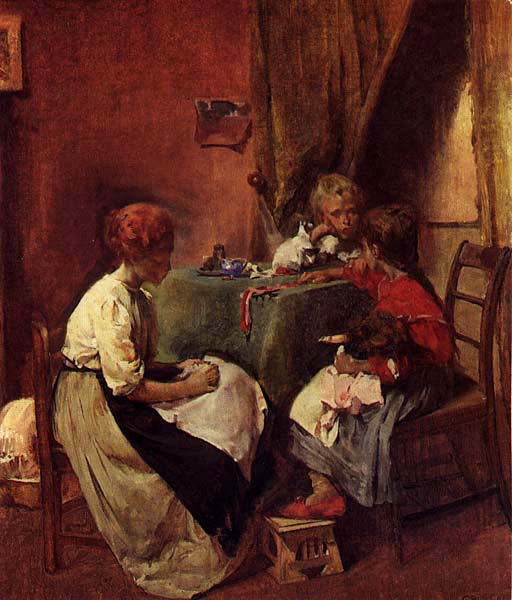
Family Scene

Maria Aurélia Martins de Sousa (June 13, 1866 – May 26, 1922) was a Portuguese painter.

== Biography ==
She was born in Valparaíso, Chile, the fourth of seven children to Portuguese emigrants António Martins de Sousa and Olinda Peres. The family lived in Brazil and Chile before moving back to Porto, Portugal in 1869, when she was three years old. They lived in the Quinta de China near the Douro River in a home bought by her father before he died in 1874, when she was eight years old. She was sister of the painter Sofia Martins de Sousa.

At the age of sixteen she began taking lessons with António da Costa Lima and painted her first self-portrait. In 1893 she began studies at the Fine-Arts Academy of Porto, where she was a pupil of João Marques de Oliveira, who greatly influenced her style. In 1898, she moved to Paris to study painting at the Julian Academy, taking courses with Jean-Paul Laurens and Jean-Joseph Benjamin-Constant. She held her first exhibition, then traveled in Europe in the next three years, before finally returning to Portugal in 1901, where she worked as an illustrator and participated regularly in Porto's art scene, exhibiting at the Sociedade de Belas-Artes do Porto, in the Galeria da Misericórdia, and annually in the Sociedade Nacional de Belas-Artes, in Lisbon.

She died in Porto in 1922, at fifty-five years old.

Her painting was of a personal and naturalist style, at times with realism, Impressionism and Post-Impressionism influences. Her subjects included portraits, landscapes, and scenes of everyday life. She is most famous for her Self-Portrait in a Red Coat, painted in 1900.

== Bibliography ==
- SILVA; Raquel Henriques da, Aurélia de Souza, Col. Pintores Portugueses. Lisboa: Edições Inapa, 2004.
