= Armando Alves =

Portuguese artist (1935–2026)

Armando José Ruivo Alves GOM (7 November 1935 – 31 March 2026) was a Portuguese artist.

== Life and career ==
Alves was born in Estremoz on 7 November 1935, and studied at Antonio Arroio School of Decorative Arts, in Lisbon.

Between 1963 and 1973, he was an assistant professor at the Porto School of Fine Arts, where he introduced the study of Graphic Arts, an area to which he would dedicate himself at length, having been professionally linked to three publishers: Editorial Inova (1968); Editorial Limiar (1975); Editorial Oiro do Dia (1980). He graphically directed literary works, produced posters, commemorative and advertising, exhibition catalogs and concert programs and sports activities. In 1983, he received the award at the Graphic Arts Exhibition Grafiporto 83, at the National Museum of Soares dos Reis.

On 9 June 2006, he was awarded the rank of Grand Officer of the Order of Merit. In 2009, he received the Póvoa Casino Arts Award.

Alves died on 31 March 2026, at the age of 90.
