= Soares dos Reis National Museum =

- Museu Nacional Soares dos Reis
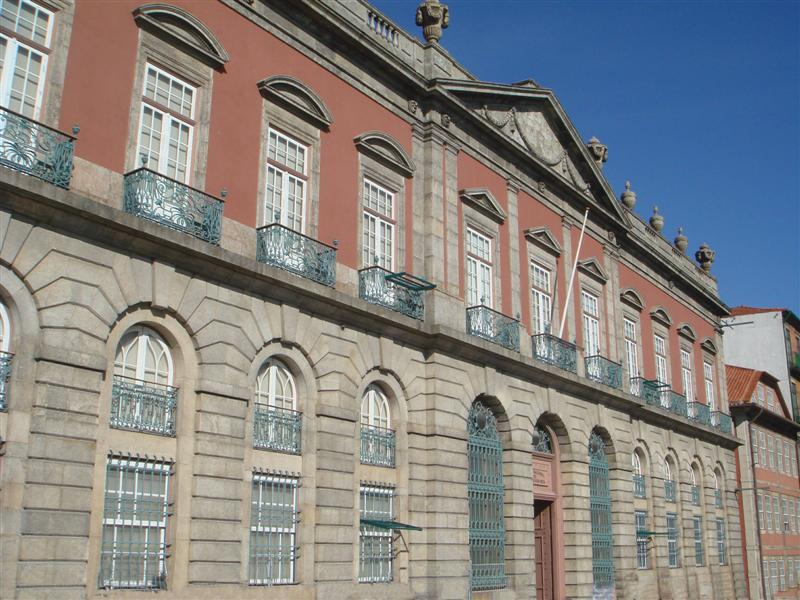
- The austere facade of the former-residence of the Carrancas (the family Moraes e Castro)

- The location of the museum Soares dos Reis in the municipality of Porto
- Interactive fullscreen map
- Established: 1833
- Location: Cedofeita, Santo Ildefonso, Sé, Miragaia, São Nicolau e Vitória, Porto, Portugal
- Coordinates: 41°08′52″N 8°37′18″W
- Type: Art museum
- Accreditation: Instituto dos Museus e Conservação
- Collections: Ceramics, Sculpture, Engravings, Jewellery, Furniture, Paintings, Textiles and Glassware
- Founder: João Baptista Ribeiro
- Director: Maria João Vasconcelos
- Architect: Joaquim da Costa Lima Sampaio
- Owners: Direção Geral do Património Cultural (Decree 114/2012, Diário da República, Série 1, 102 (25 May 2012)
- Public transit access: Carragal
- Parking: Around the museum
- Website: museusoaresdosreis.pt

Soares dos Reis National Museum (Portuguese: Museu Nacional Soares dos Reis) is a museum, currently housed in the Carrancas Palace situated in the civil parish of Cedofeita, Santo Ildefonso, Sé, Miragaia, São Nicolau e Vitória, in the northern Portuguese city of Porto.

Founded in 1833, it is the first Portuguese national museum exhibiting collections of Portuguese art, including a collection by Portuguese sculptor António Soares dos Reis, from which the museum derives its name.

== History ==
The museum was founded in 1833 as Museum Portuense by King Peter IV. Initially it was housed in the Convent of Santo António (in the centre of Porto), exhibiting religious art confiscated from Portuguese convents, and those works of art expropriated from the absolutist followers of Miguel I (who had struggled against Peter IV a year before).

During the 19th century the museum made several acquisitions that were integrated into the main collection, including, in 1850, Museu Allen, the private museum of a British port wine exporter, John Francis Allen, which remained as a branch of the main museum until 1905.

But, it was in 1911 that the museum obtained its collection of work by Soares dos Reis, a celebrated Portuguese sculptor, taking on the name of its benefactor.

In 1942 the museum was transferred from the centre of the city to the former-residence of the Moraes e Castro family, known commonly as the Carrancas (which means scowlers/frowners, a passing reference to the disapproving nature of its members). The large building provided the spaces and conditions to store and exhibit the collections. Over time, the spaces were expanded and modernised under a project by architect Fernando Távora.

== Collections ==
The procession by Auguste Roquemont

The museum has a vast collection mainly focused on Portuguese art of the 19th and 20th centuries, including painting, sculpture, furniture, metalwork and ceramics.

Artists represented include painters Domingos Sequeira, Vieira Portuense, Auguste Roquemont, Miguel Ângelo Lupi, António Carvalho de Silva Porto, Marques de Oliveira, Henrique Pousão, Aurélia de Souza, Sofia Martins de Sousa, Dórdio Gomes, Júlio Resende and sculptors Soares do Reis, Augusto Santo, António Teixeira Lopes, Rodolfo Pinto do Couto and many others.
