= António Soares dos Reis =

Portuguese sculptor (1847–1889)

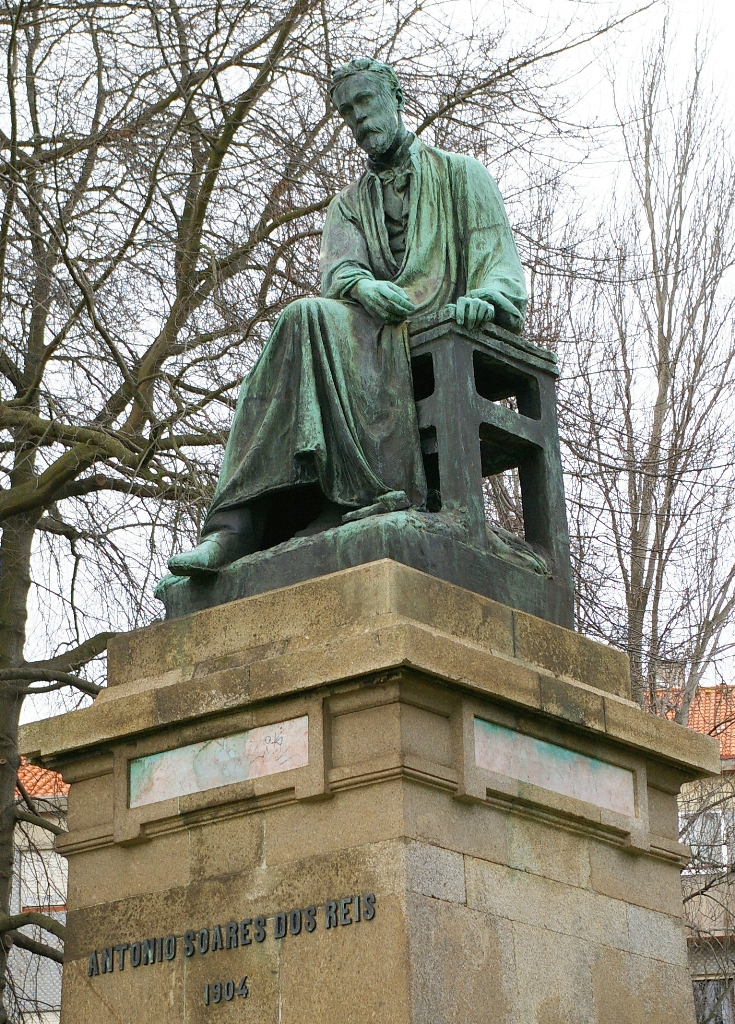
- Statue to Soares dos Reis by António Teixeira Lopes, in Vila Nova de Gaia
- Born: 14 October 1847; Vila Nova de Gaia, Portugal
- Died: 16 February 1889 (aged 41); Vila Nova de Gaia, Portugal
- Occupation: Sculptor

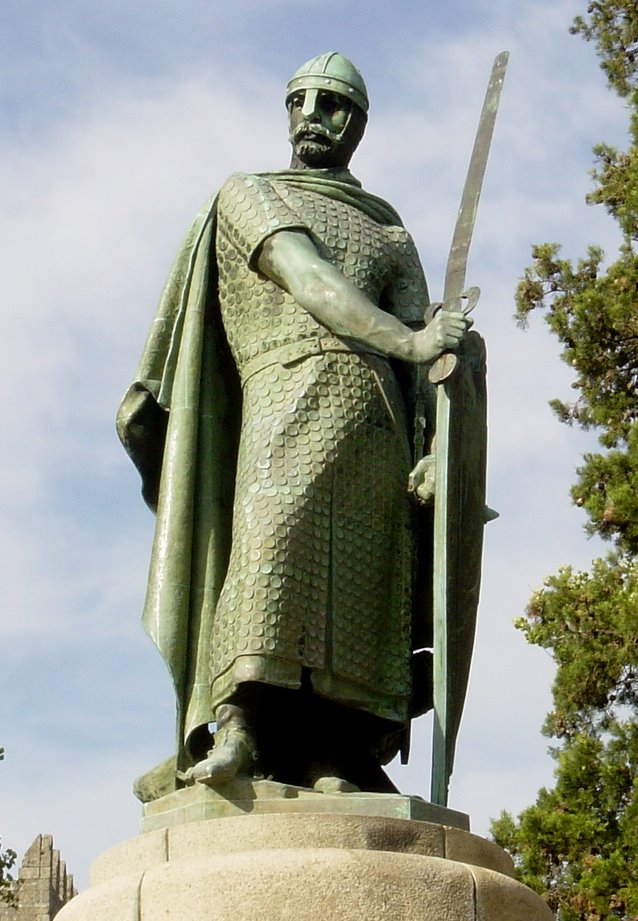
Statue of Afonso Henriques by Soares dos Reis

António Manuel Soares dos Reis (Vila Nova de Gaia, 14 October 1847 - Vila Nova de Gaia, 16 February 1889) was a Portuguese sculptor.

== Studies ==
He first studied at the Portuense Academy of Fine Arts, where he graduated in sculpture in 1867. He studied at the École des Beaux-Arts in Paris, from 1867 to 1870, where he achieved several prizes, and in Rome (1871–1872). It was there that he executed his finest work, in Carrara marble, the acclaimed "O Desterrado" ("The Exiled"), a touching image of neoclassical, romantic and realist resemblances, that is the masterpiece of Portuguese sculpture.

After returning to Portugal, he returned to Porto, where he taught at the Portuense Academy of Fine Arts.

Misunderstood and little credited in life, he committed suicide, aged only 41. He is considered, by far, one of the leading names in Portuguese realist sculpture.

== Fame ==
The finest collection of his pieces is shown in a room dedicated to him at the National Museum Soares dos Reis, in Porto, including "O Desterrado" and the touching and kind figuration of the "Count of Ferreira" (1876).

In 1949, a short film was made about him, entitled "O Desterrado - Vida e Obra de Soares dos Reis" (The Exiled - Life and works of Soares dos Reis). It was directed by Manuel Guimarães and starred José Amaro, Dórdio Guimarães and Maria Olguim.
