= João Marques de Oliveira =

Portuguese painter (1853–1927)

Marques de Oliveira
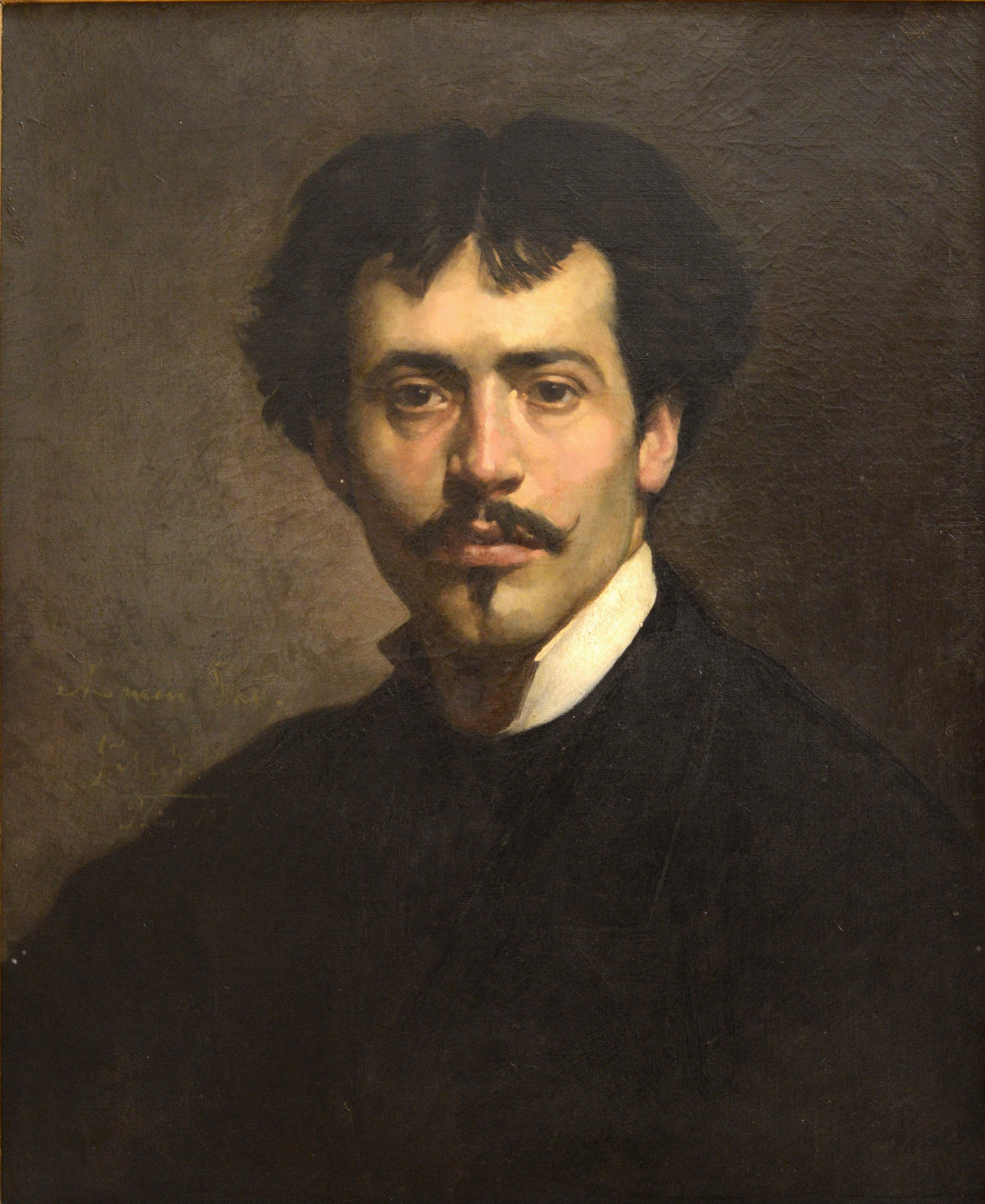
- Self-portrait (1876), Museu José Malhoa, Caldas da Rainha, Portugal
- Born: 23 August 1853; Porto, Portugal
- Died: 9 October 1927 (aged 74); Porto, Portugal
- Known for: Painting
- Notable work: Media related to João Marques de Oliveira at Wikimedia Commons
- Movement: Naturalism

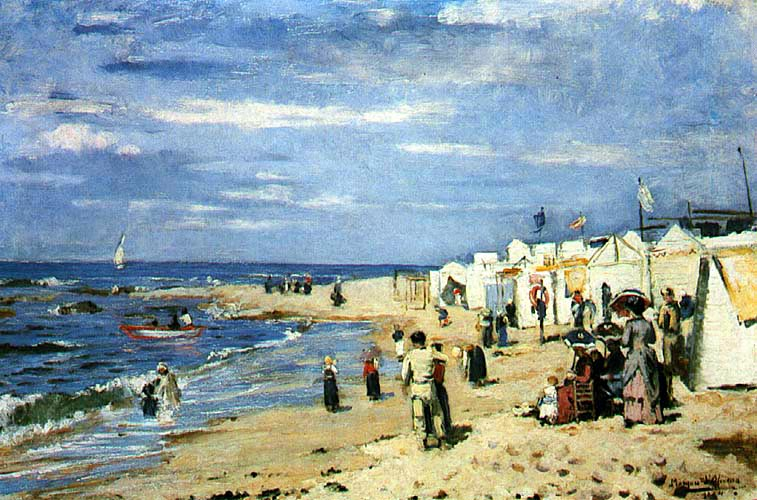
Bathing Beach (1884)

João Joaquim Marques da Silva Oliveira (23 August 1853 – 9 October 1927) was a Portuguese painter in the Naturalist style.

== Biography ==
Oliveira was born in Porto. In 1864, when he was only eleven, he entered the Escola Superior de Belas-Artes do Porto. Five years later, he enrolled in the history painting course taught by João António Correia and graduated in 1873. For the next six years, he lived in France with his colleague António da Silva Porto while they studied at the École des Beaux-arts under Alexandre Cabanel and Adolphe Yvon. While living there, they also made study trips to Belgium, England, the Netherlands and Italy. The sketches and paintings that resulted from these trips led to his participation in the Salons of 1876 and 1878.

Upon his return to Porto in 1879, he worked as a free-lance artist and helped introduce the concept of plein-air painting in Portugal. The following year, he became Vice-President of the Centro Artístico Portuense, an association for the advancement of the arts modeled on the "Lion's Group" of Lisbon. From 1881 to 1926, he was a professor at the Academy in Porto and later held the position of Director. Some of his pupils were Aurélia de Sousa and Lino António.

In 1911, he was appointed Chairman of the Board and a member of the Executive Committee for Art at the newly reorganized Soares dos Reis National Museum. In 1913, he became the Director. He reluctantly resigned all of his positions in 1926, when he reached the mandatory retirement age for public employees, and died the following year in his home city of Porto. In 1929, he was honored with a bronze bust in the Jardim de São Lázaro, next to the Academy.

The Soares dos Reis National Museum houses his Cabeça de raparigo (Head of a girl) and Interior, Costureiras trabalhando (Seamstresses at work).
