= List of Portuguese artists =

This is a list of artists from, or associated with Portugal. Artists are listed in alphabetical order by last name.

== A ==
- Add Fuel (born 1980), visual artist and illustrator
- Jorge Afonso (c. 1470-1540)
- Nadir Afonso (1920-2013)
- Filipe Alarcão (born 1963), designer
- Francisco Keil do Amaral (1910-1975)
- Helena Almeida (1934-2018)
- Sofia Areal (born 1960)

== B ==
- Bordalo II (born 1987), street artist
- Carlos Botelho (1899-1982)
- Manuel Botelho (born 1950)
- João de Brito (born 1958), Portuguese-American artist, oil painter and sculptor

== C ==
- Pedro Calapez (born 1953)
- Fernando Calhau (1948-2002)
- Nuno de Campos (born 1969)
- Manuel Cargaleiro (1927-2024), painter and ceramist
- Manuel Carmo (1958-2015)
- António Carneiro (1872-1930)
- João Carqueijeiro (born 1954), plastic artist
- Nicolau Chanterene (1485-1555), French sculptor and architect who worked mainly in Portugal and Spain
- Eduardo Teixeira Coelho (1919-2005), comic book artist
- Evelina Coelho (1945–2013), painter
- José Dias Coelho (1923-1961)
- Jorge Colaço (1868-1942)
- João Cutileiro (1937-2021), sculptor especially of women's torsos in marble

== D ==
- António Dacosta (1914-1990)
- Francisco Coelho Maduro Dias (1904-1986), painter and sculptor
- Carlos Domingomes (born 1980)

== E ==
- Mário Eloy (1900-1951)

== F ==
- Garcia Fernandes (died c. 1565)
- Vasco Fernandes (1474-1541)
- Cristóvão de Figueiredo (1449-1539)

== G ==
- Luis Geraldes (born 1957)
- Nuno Gonçalves (fl. 1450-1471)

== H ==
- Hazul (born 1981), graffiti artist
- Francisco Henriques (died 1518)
- João Hogan (1914-1988)
- Francisco de Holanda (1517-1585), Renaissance humanist and painter

== J ==
- Josefa de Óbidos (ca. 1630-1684)
- Ana Jotta (born 1946)

== K ==
- Alfredo Keil (1850-1907)
- Kim Prisu (born 1962)

== L ==
- Fernando Lanhas (1923-2012)
- António Teixeira Lopes, (1866-1942), sculptor
- Cristóvão Lopes (c. 1516-1594)
- Gregório Lopes (c. 1490 – 1550)
- Miguel Ângelo Lupi (1826-1883)

== M ==
- António Macedo - realist painter (born 1954)
- Joaquim Machado de Castro - sculptor, writer, teacher (1731-1822)
- Diogo Machado (born 1980) - illustrator & street artist
- José Malhoa (1855-1933)
- Abel Manta (1888-1982)
- João Abel Manta (born 1928)
- João Marques de Oliveira (1853-1927)
- Henrique Medina (1901-1988)
- Albuquerque Mendes (born 1953)
- Jorge Melício (born 1957)
- Graça Morais (born 1948)

== N ==
- José de Almada Negreiros (1893–1970)
- Sá Nogueira (1921–2002)

== P ==
- Abigail de Paiva Cruz (1883-1944)
- António Palolo (1946-2000)
- Artur Pastor (1922-1999), photographer
- António Pedro (1909-1966)
- Manuel Pereira da Silva (1920-2003), sculptor
- Álvaro Perdigão (1910-1994)
- Diogo Pimentão (born 1973)
- Columbano Bordalo Pinheiro (1857-1929)
- Rafael Bordalo Pinheiro (1846-1905), known for illustrations, caricatures, sculpture and ceramics designs, and is considered the first Portuguese comics creator
- Júlio Pomar (1926-2018)
- Henrique Pousão (1859-1884)
- Pedro Portugal (born 1963)
- Kim Prisu (born 1962)

== R ==
- Paula Rego (1935-2022)
- Maria Inês Ribeiro da Fonseca (1926-1995)
- Rigo 23 (born 1966)
- José Rodrigues (1828-1887)
- Carlos Roque (1936-2006), comics artist

== S ==
- José María Sá Lemos (1892–1971), sculptor
- Abel Salazar (1889-1946)
- Santa-Rita Pintor (1889-1918), painter
- Bartolomeu Cid dos Santos (1931-2008), artist and professor who specialized in the plastic arts with an emphasis on engravings
- Julião Sarmento (1948–2021)
- Domingos Sequeira (1768-1837)
- António Carvalho de Silva Porto (1850-1893)
- João Artur da Silva (born 1928)
- António Soares dos Reis (1847-1889), sculptor
- Amadeo de Souza Cardoso (1887-1918)
- Aurélia de Souza (1865-1922)
- Sofia Martins de Sousa (1870-1960)

== T ==
- Toonman (born 1975)
- Pedro Tudela (born 1962)

== V ==
- Artur Varela (1937–2017)
- Joana Vasconcelos (born 1971)
- Mário Cesariny de Vasconcelos (1923-2006)
- Maria Velez (1933–2017)
- Marcelino Vespeira (1925-2002)
- Vhils (born 1987), graffiti and street artist
- Eduardo Viana (1881-1967)
- Vieira Portuense (1765-1805)
- Maria Helena Vieira da Silva (1907-1992)
