= Carlos Gomes =

Carlos Gomes may refer to:

== Sports ==
- Carlos Gomes (footballer, born 1932) (1932–2005), Portuguese football goalkeeper
- Carlos Alberto Parreira (Carlos Alberto Gomes Parreira, born 1943), Brazilian footballer and manager
- Pintinho (Carlos Alberto Gomes, born 1954), Brazilian footballer
- Carlos Alberto (footballer, born 1980) (Carlos Alberto dos Santos Gomes, born 1980), Brazilian footballer
- Carlos Alberto (footballer, born December 1984) (Carlos Alberto Gomes de Jesus, born 1984), Brazilian footballer
- Carlos Alberto (footballer, born 1987) (Carlos Alberto Gomes de Lima, born 1987), Brazilian footballer
- Carlos Mendes Gomes (born 1998), Spanish footballer

== Other people ==
- Antônio Carlos Gomes (1836–1896), Brazilian composer
- Carlos Carvalhas (Carlos Alberto do Vale Gomes Carvalhas, born 1941), Portuguese politician
- Carlos Gomes Júnior (born 1949), former Prime Minister of Guinea-Bissau
- Carlos Gomes (Brazilian politician) (born 1972), Brazilian politician
- Carlos Domingomes (Carlos Gomes, born 1980), Portuguese film director

== Places ==
- Carlos Gomes, Rio Grande do Sul, Brazilian municipality

== See also ==
- Carlos Gomez (disambiguation)
