= Carlos Gómez =

Carlos Gómez may refer to:

== Entertainment ==
- Carlos Gómez (Paraguayan actor) (1917–2009), Paraguayan screen and stage actor
- Carlos Gómez Barrera (1918–1996), Mexican musician
- Carlos Gomez (American actor) (born 1962), American actor

== Sports ==
- Carlos Gómez Sánchez (1923–1980), Peruvian footballer
- Carlos Gómez (footballer, born 1952) (1952–2017), Mexican footballer
- Carlos Gómez-Díaz (born 1968), Argentine tennis player
- Carlos Clos Gómez (born 1972), football referee
- Carlos Gómez (baseball) (born 1985), Dominican baseball outfielder
- Carlos Gómez-Herrera (born 1990), Spanish tennis player
- Carlos Gómez (footballer, born 1992), Chilean footballer
- Carlos Gómez (footballer, born 1994), Spanish footballer

== Others ==
- Carlos Enríquez Gómez (1900–1957), Cuban painter, illustrator and writer
- Carlos Gómez Carrera (1903–1940), Spanish cartoonist, executed by Francoist Spain
- Carlos Enrique Gómez Centurión (1924–2018), Argentine politician
- Carlos Gómez Álava (1926–1988), Filipino poet
- Carlos Gómez Amat (1926–2016), Spanish journalist and musicologist, taught at the Madrid Royal Conservatory
- Carlos Argüello Gómez (born 1947), Nicaraguan lawyer and diplomat
- Carlos M. Gomez (born 1961/62), American police chief

== See also ==
- Carlos Gomes (disambiguation)
