= Artur Pastor =

Portuguese photographer (1922–1999

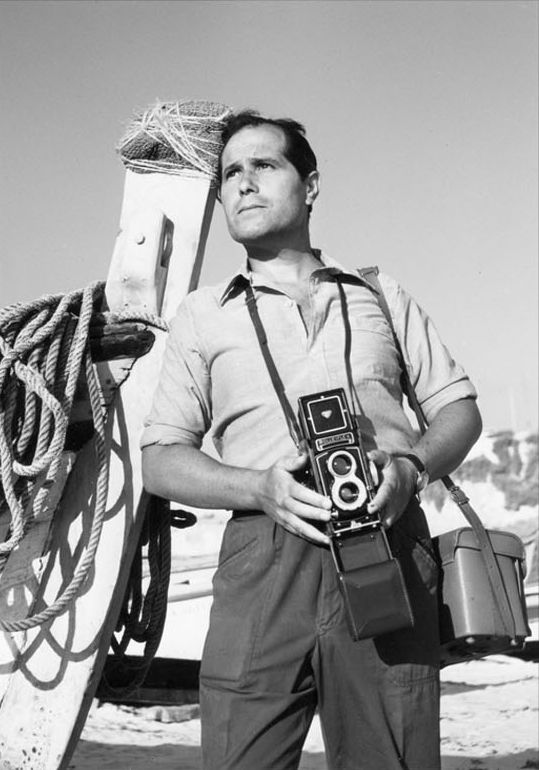
- Artur Pastor, photo by Artur Pastor (son)
- Born: 1 May 1922; Alter do Chão, Portugal
- Died: 17 September 1999 (aged 77); Lisbon, Portugal
- Occupation: Photographer

Artur Pastor (1 May 1922 in Alter do Chão – 17 September 1999 in Lisbon), was a Portuguese photographer.

== Exhibitions ==
He individually held fourteen photography exhibitions with focus on the one that took place at the Foz Palace in 1970 with 360 pieces of work, and at the Galveias Palace in 1986, involving 136 photographs.

After his death, three other exhibitions took place with his pieces of work.

- "Motivos do Sul", with the theme Alentejo, Algarve and Serra de Arrábida, in Circulo Cultural of Algarve, Faro, January 1946 (300 photographs)
- at the information office of "Comissão Municipal de Turismo de Faro", Faro, in 1946
- at the "Salão de Festas da Sociedade Recreativa Olhanense", Olhão, in 1946
- "Motivos do Sul", with the theme Algarve, Setúbal and Alentejo, at the "Sociedade Harmonia Eborense", Évora, in June 1946
- with the theme Alentejo, at the "Pátio Árabe da Casa do Alentejo", Lisbon, in May 1947
- with the theme Setúbal's city and region, at the "Salão Nobre da Câmara Municipal de Setúbal", Setúbal, in July 1947
- with the theme Algarve, Alentejo and Setubal, at the Barrocal Palace, Évora, in June 1949
- with the theme Sesimbra's beach, at the shop windows of the Casa J. C. Alvarez, Lda., Augusta Street, Lisbon, in October 1949
- with the theme Albufeira's beach and people, at the shop windows of the Casa J. C. Alvarez, Lda., Augusta Street, Lisbon, in August 1950
- National Tourism Exhibition, at the Foz Palace, Lisbon, in 1953 (collective exhibition)
- at the Salão Maior do Foz Palace, Lisbon, in December 1970 (360 photographs)
- with the theme snowy landscape in Tras-os-Montes, at the shop windows of the Casa J. C. Alvarez, Lisbon, in December 1974
- "Apontamentos de Lisboa", with the theme Lisbon, at the Galveias Palace, Lisbon, in June 1986 (136 photographs)
- "Pequena Mostra de Fotografias de Artur Pastor", at the "Junta de Freguesia de Santiago", Lisbon, in November 1986
- "Algarve (anos 50–60) Alguns Apontamentos", at the Art Gallery "Pintor Samora Barros", Albufeira, in April 1998
- "Artur Pastor 'O Domador da Rolleiflex'", at the gallery "ColorFoto", Porto, in July 2006
- "História(s) da Terra: Fotografias de Artur Pastor", at the Bread Museum, Seia, in October 2006
- "A Nazaré de Artur Pastor", at the "Biblioteca Municipal da Nazaré", Nazaré, in November 2008

== See also ==
- List of photographers
- List of Portuguese artists
