= Garcia Fernandes =

Portuguese actor

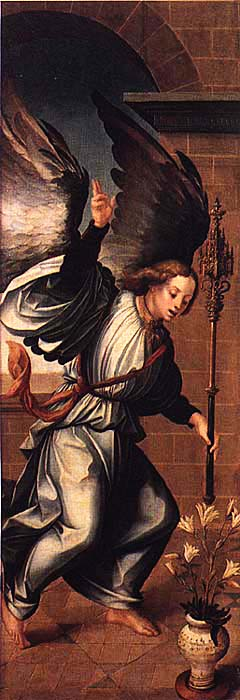
Angel of the Annunciation (c.1531) by Garcia Fernandes, from the Santa Clara Convent in Coimbra, now in the Machado de Castro Museum.

Garcia Fernandes (died c. 1565) was a Portuguese Renaissance painter. Like many painters of the time, Garcia Fernandes was a pupil in the Lisbon workshop of Jorge Afonso, who was the court painter of King Manuel I.

In the 1530s he worked in Coimbra for the monasteries of Santa Clara-a-Velha and of Santa Cruz. In 1533 and 1534, together with Cristóvão de Figueiredo and Gregório Lopes, he was responsible for the three painted altarpieces of the Monastery of Ferreirim, near Lamego. Later, he painted panels for the transept of the Church of St Francis in Évora.

In Lisbon, he was responsible for the altarpiece of the Trindade Convent and the panel for the St Bartholomew Chapel of Lisbon Cathedral (c. 1537), as well as a large oil painting, The Marriage of Saint Alexis (once known as The Marriage of King Manuel of Portugal) (1541), now in the Museum of São Roque. Fernandes even painted altarpieces commissioned for the cathedral of Old Goa, in Portuguese India, then a part of the Portuguese Empire.

Garcia Fernandes married in 1518 and had at least nine children. His paintings can be seen in several churches and monasteries around Portugal, as well as in the National Museum of Ancient Art (Lisbon) and the Machado de Castro Museum (Coimbra).

== Gallery ==
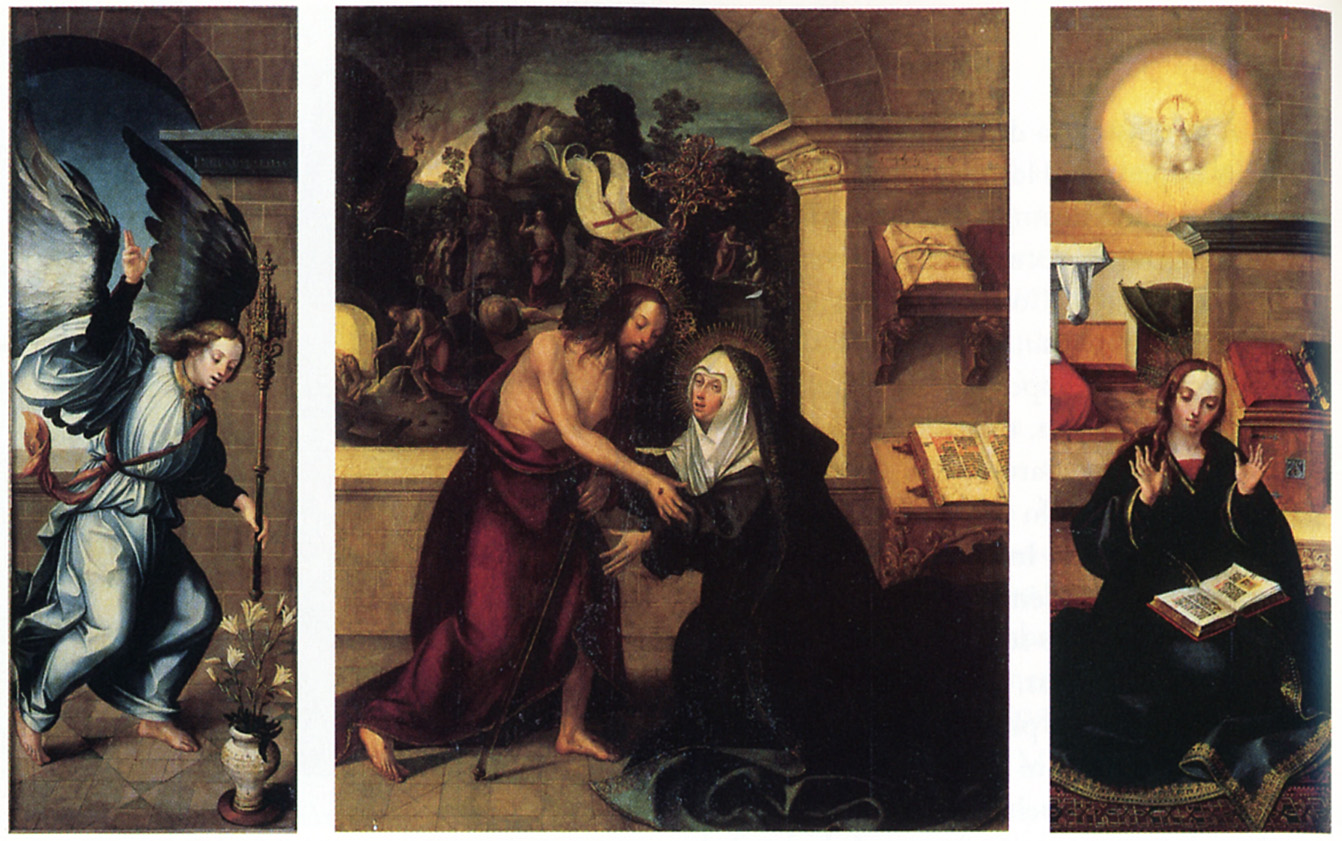
Triptych of the Apparition of Christ to the Virgin - Museu Nacional Machado de Castro

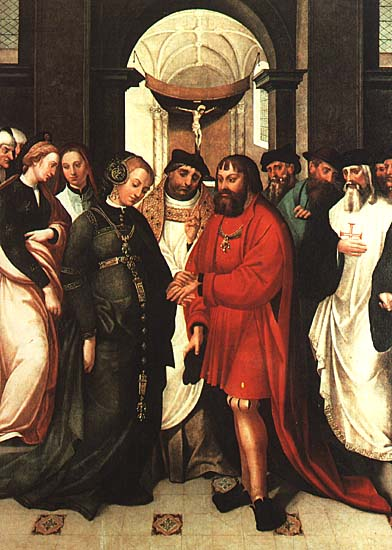
Wedding of Dom Manuel I - Museu de S.Roque

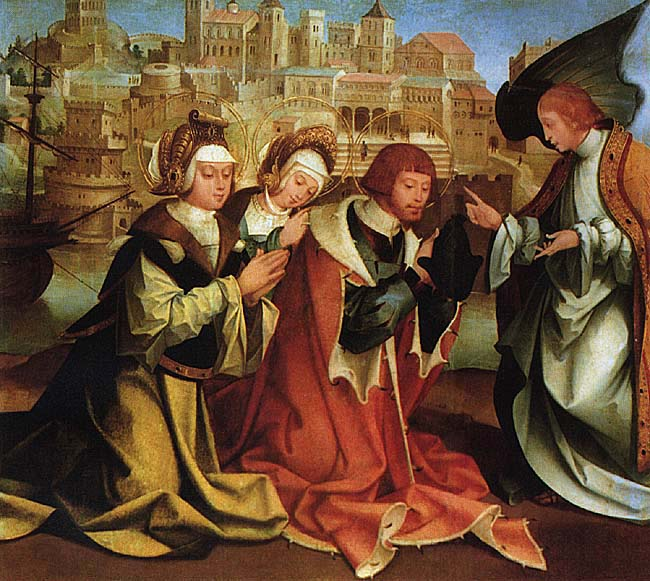
The Holy Martyrs of Lisbon - Museu de Carlos Machado
