= Toonman =

- Born: Pedro José Bento Alves; 14 June 1975 (age 51) Lisbon, Portugal
- Areas: illustration, comics, caricature
- Spouse: Patricia Pimentel (m. 1978)
- Children: Francisco José Pimentel Alves (2007- ), Gabriel José Pimentel Alves (2009- )
- Relatives: Cesino Panão Alves and Ana Paula Abrantes Bento (Parents)

Pedro Alves a.k.a. Toonman (born 14 June 1975 in Lisbon) is a Portuguese illustrator. He has edited work in the fields of cartoons, comics, comic strips, caricature and character design. The style is mainly vector cartoons. His work with the Flor de Lis magazine is a benchmark in Scout-related illustrations.

== Major works ==
- Cover for Flor de Lis magazine on Totems, Christmas, ACANAC 07
- 1st prize cartoon in the Amadora comics festival
- 1st prize comics in DN Jovem contest
- Stuart awards shortlist 2005-IVA, 2006-Homeworker's safety

== Major clients ==
- WHO - creative talents agency
- Jornal de Noticias
- Casa Cláudia
- Flor de Lis
- BD Jornal
- BD Voyeur
