= Cristóvão de Figueiredo =

Portuguese painter

Cristóvão de Figueiredo (died c. 1540) was a Portuguese Renaissance painter.

Like many other important painters of the time, Cristóvão de Figueiredo was a pupil of Master Jorge Afonso, in Lisbon, in the early 16th century. He later worked together with Francisco Henriques, Garcia Fernandes and Gregório Lopes in executing various altarpieces in Lisbon.

Between 1522 and 1533, Cristóvão de Figueiredo worked in the Santa Cruz Monastery in Coimbra and, in 1533, again joined Garcia Fernandes and Gregório Lopes in painting altarpieces for the Monastery of Ferreirim, near Lamego.

Many of his paintings are now in the National Museum of Ancient Art (Lisbon) and the Machado de Castro Museum (Coimbra).

== Works ==
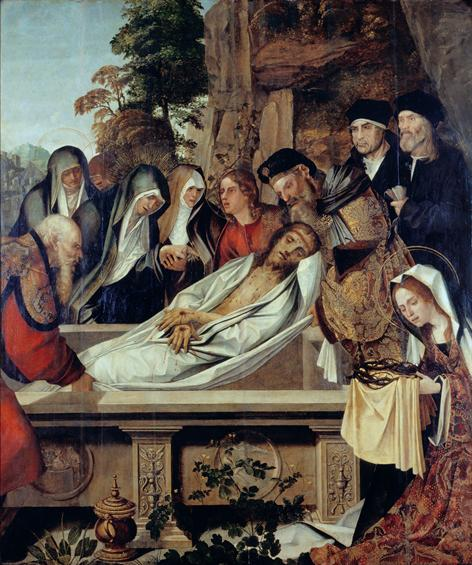
"Deposição no Túmulo" - Museu Nacional de Arte Antiga

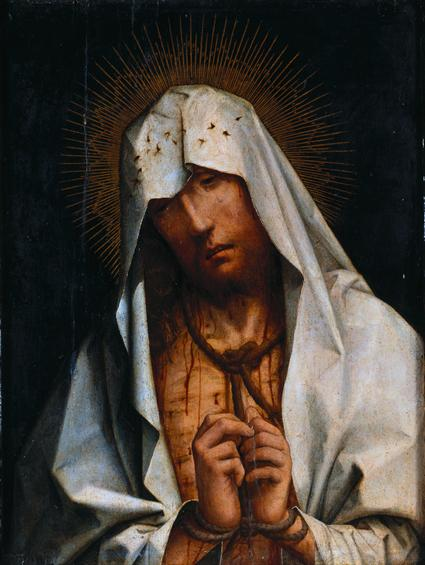
"Ecce Homo" - Museu Nacional de Arte Antiga

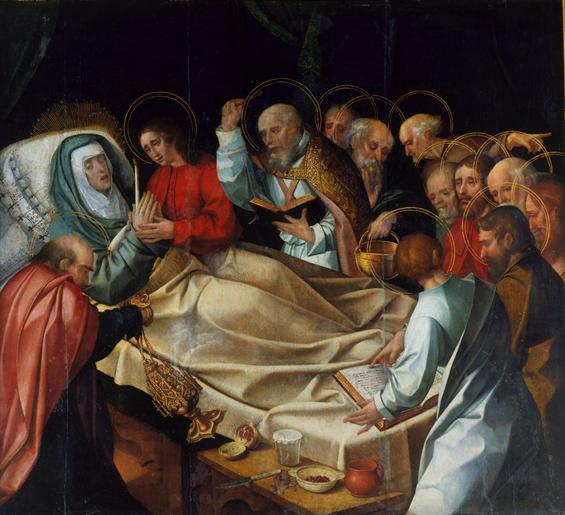
"Trânsito da virgem" - Museu Nacional de Arte Antiga

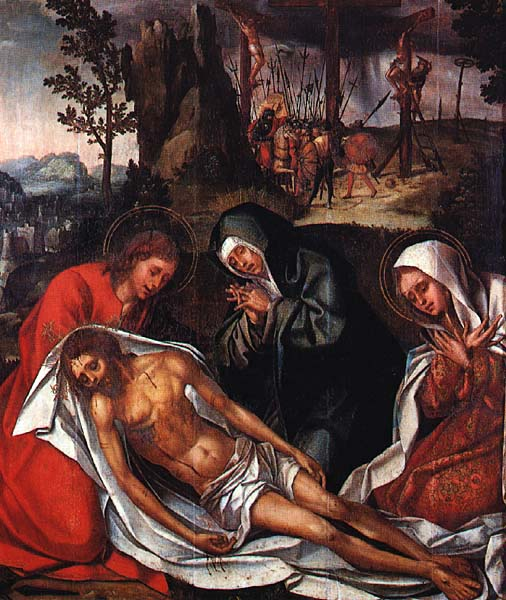
"Cristo deposto da cruz" - Patriarcado de Lisboa

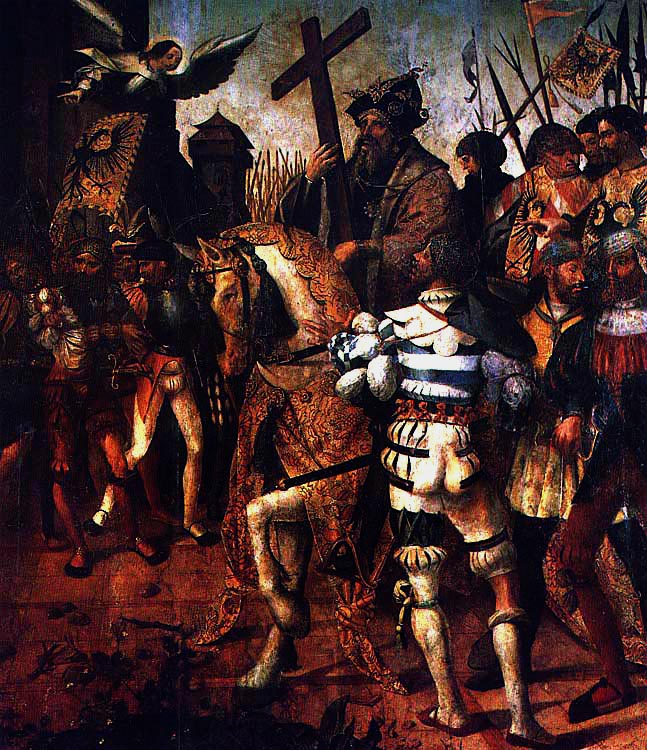
"Exaltação da Santa Cruz" - Museu Nacional de Machado de Castro

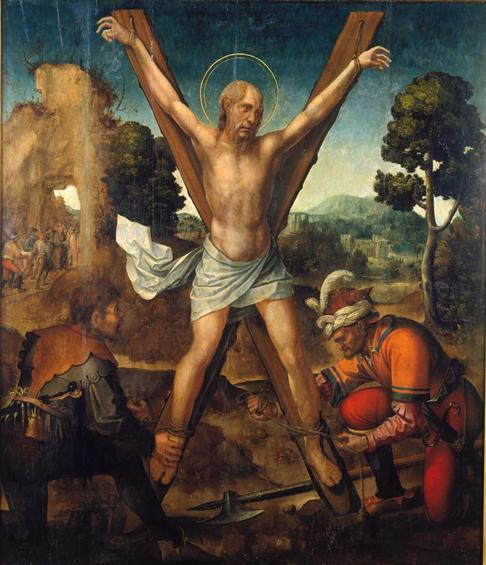
"Martírio de Santo André" - Museu Nacional de Arte Antiga

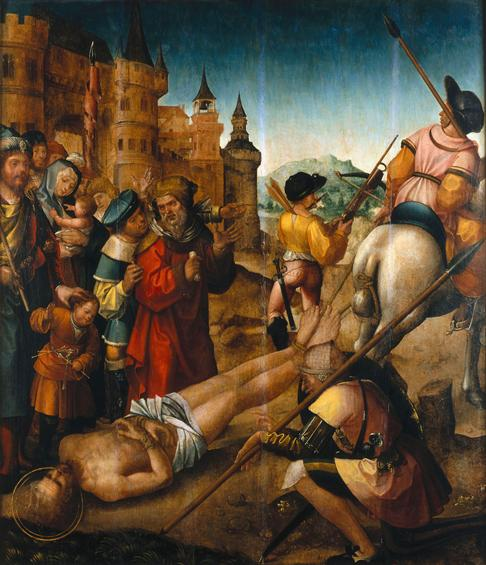
"Martírio de Santo Hipólito" - Museu Nacional de Arte Antiga

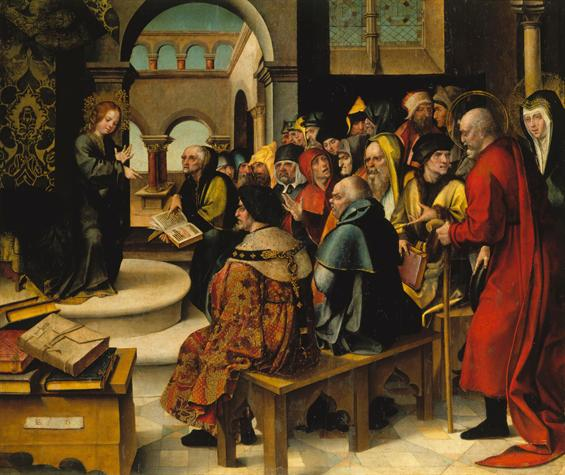
"Menino Jesus entre os Doutores" - Museu Nacional de Arte Antiga

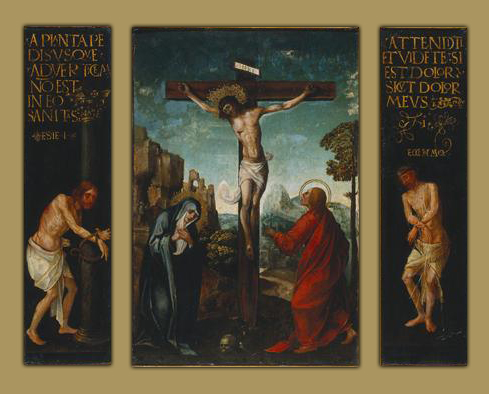
"Tríptico da Paixão de Cristo" - Museu Nacional de Arte Antiga

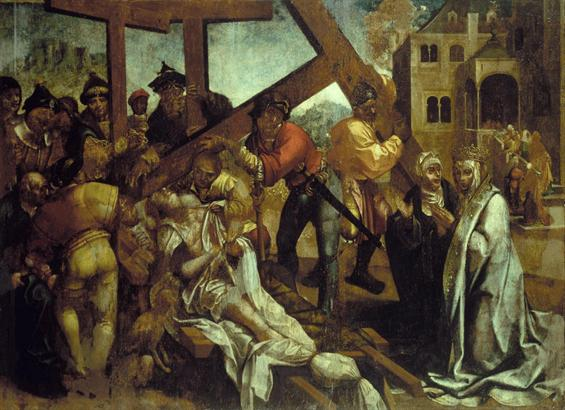
"Milagre da Ressurreição do Mancebo" - Museu Nacional Machado de Castro

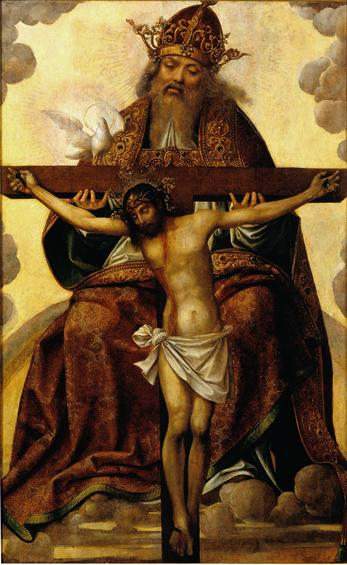
"Santíssima Trindade" - Museu Nacional Soares dos Reis
