= Carlos Gómez Álava =

Filipino poet (born 1926)

- Born: July 14, 1926; Hagonoy, Bulacan, Philippines
- Died: March 9, 1988 (aged 61); Barcelona, Spain
- Education: University of Santo Tomas, Complutense University of Madrid
- Children: 3
- Writing career
- Language: Spanish
- Notable work: Excelsitudes
- Notable awards: Premio Lobo

Carlos Gómez Álava, known as Carlos Gómez, was a Filipino writer in Spanish best known for his book of poems Excelsitudes.

Nick Joaquin called him "the last Filipino writer in Spanish."
