= João Carqueijeiro =

Portuguese plastic artist

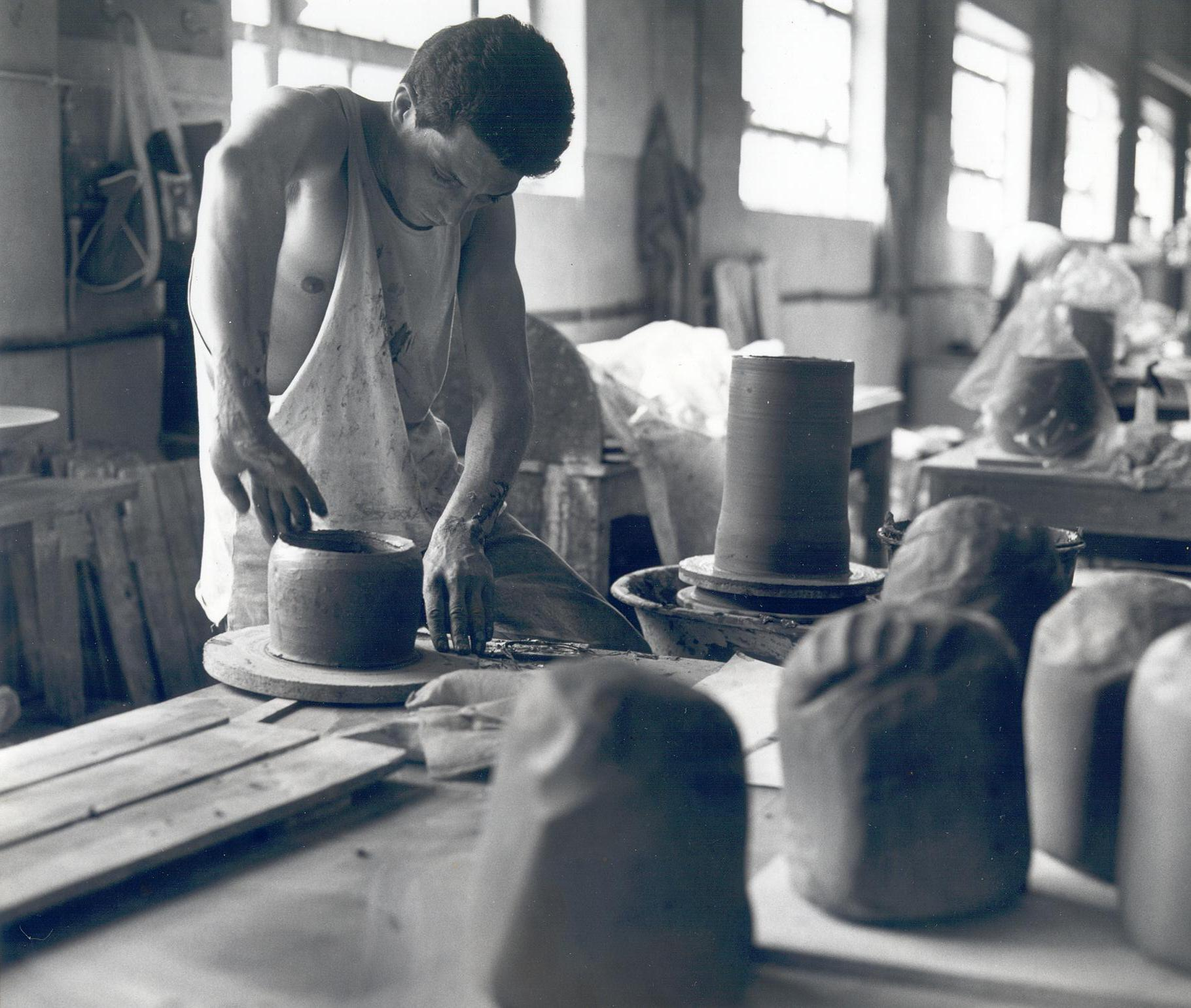
- João Carqueijeiro on the International Symposium of Ceramics of Alcobaça (Portugal), July 1987
- Born: João Edmundo Lemos Carqueijeiro; February 25, 1954 (age 72); Lobito, Portuguese Angola
- Known for: plastic artist

João Edmundo Lemos Carqueijeiro (born 25 February 1954) is a Portuguese plastic artist.

== Biography ==
He was born in Lobito, Portuguese Angola on 25 February 1954.

Until he was twenty years old, he lived in Lourenço Marques, Portuguese Mozambique (now Maputo, Mozambique), and in 1974, after the Carnation Revolution, he went to Porto, Portugal. It was there that, in 1982, he concluded his High Graduation in Drawing (under the direction of the master Sá Nogueira) at the Cooperativa Árvore (ESAP). He also graduated and specialized in Wheel, Raku, and Glazes at La Bisbal Ceramic School, in Catalonia.

He has taught Ceramic Arts since 1985.

== Selected works ==
A small selection of some of works of João Carqueijeiro divided by categories.

=== Sculpture (Árvores - tree series) ===
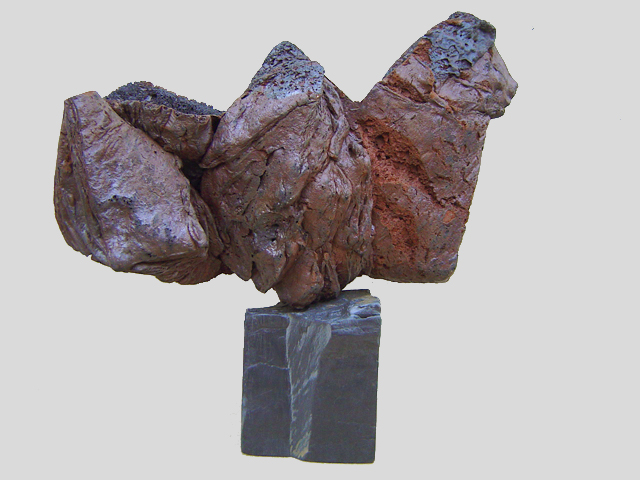
(untitled)

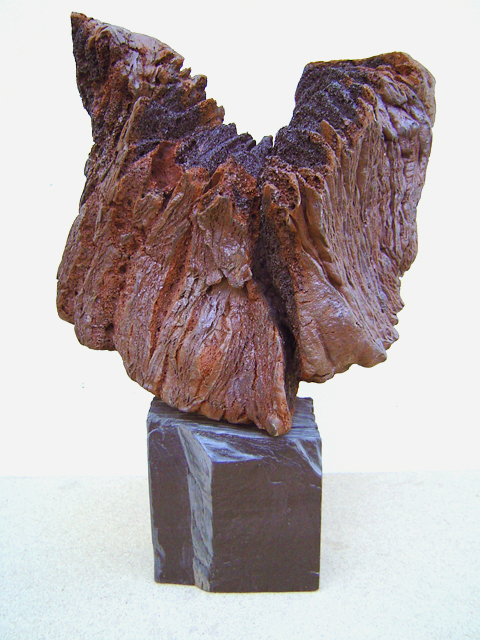
(untitled)

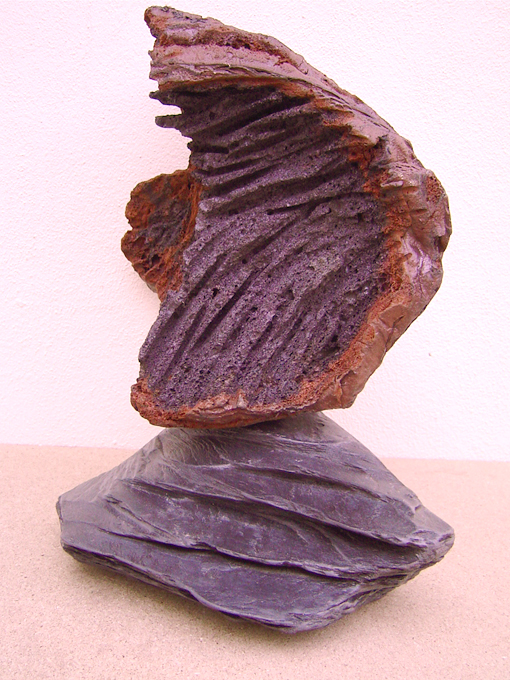
(untitled)

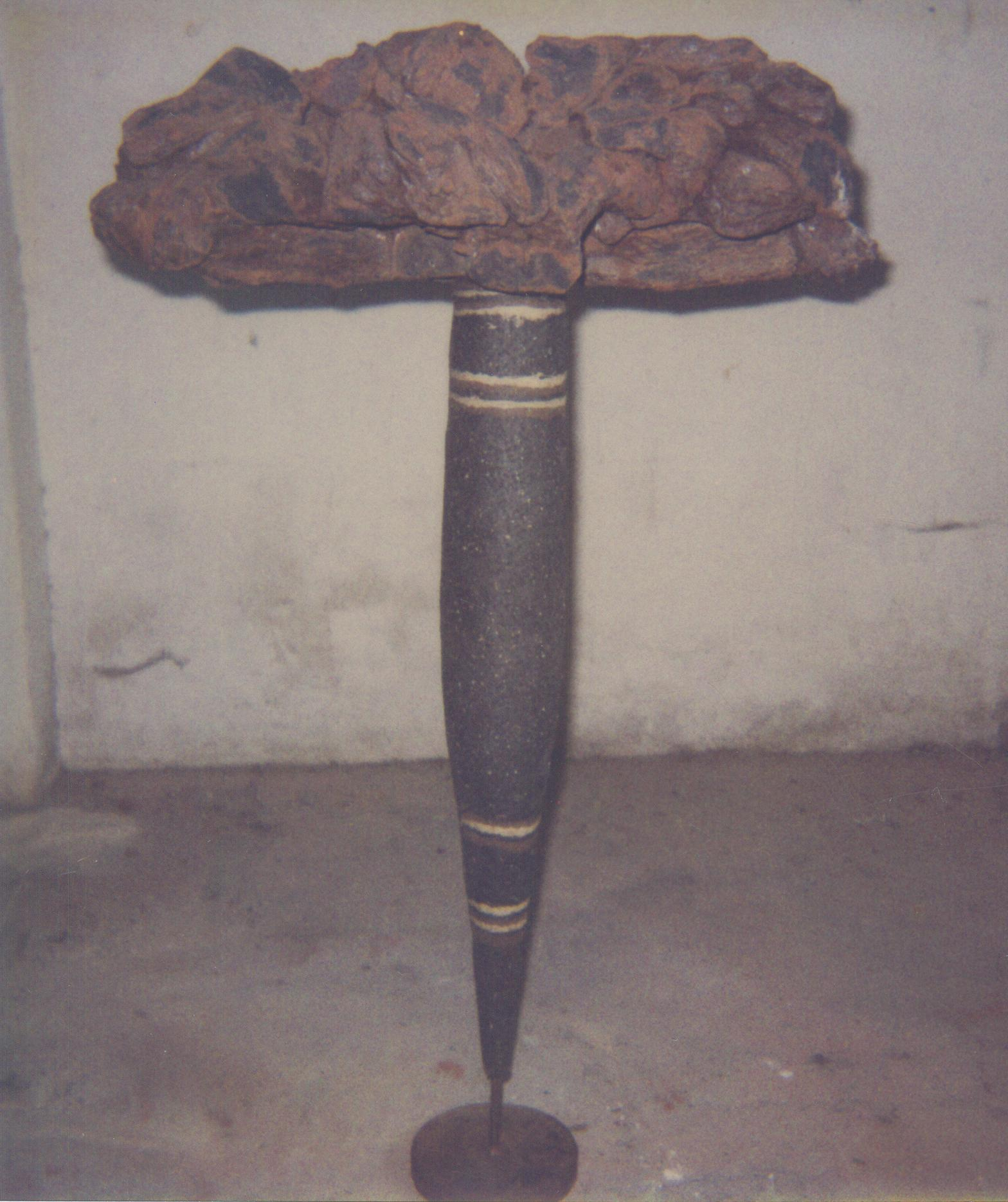
(untitled)

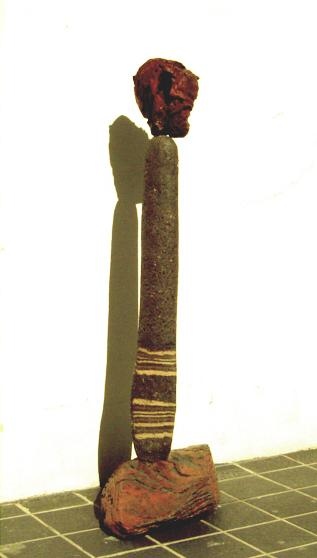
(untitled)

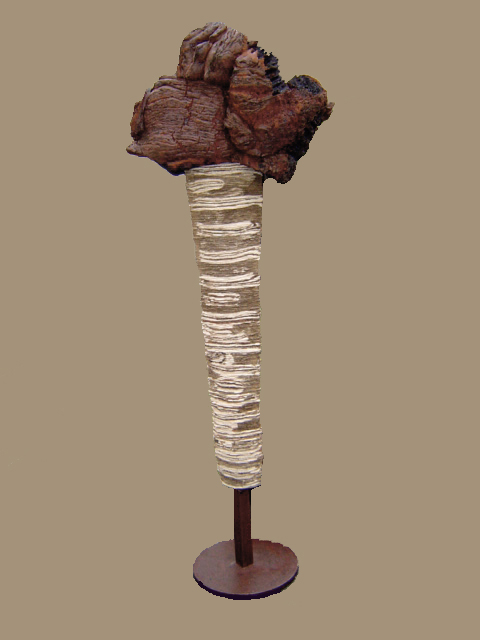
(untitled)

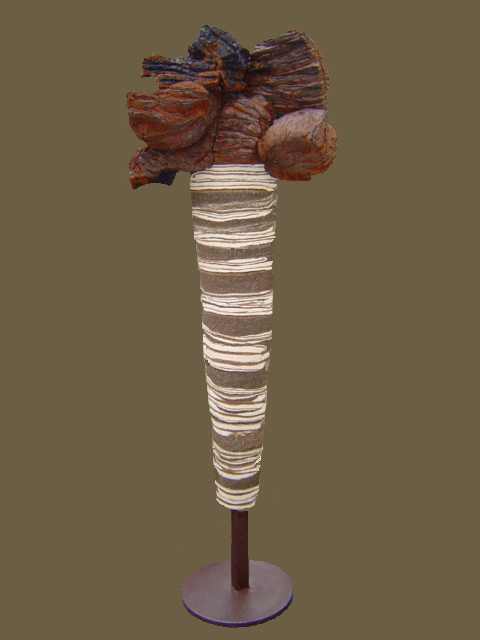
(untitled)

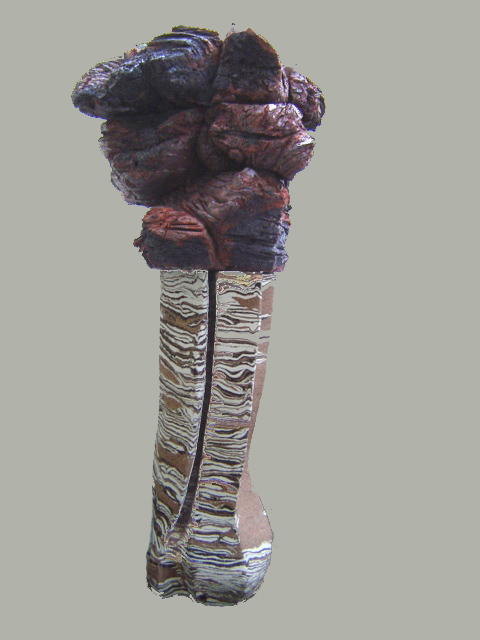
(untitled)

=== Sculpture (colored clay) ===
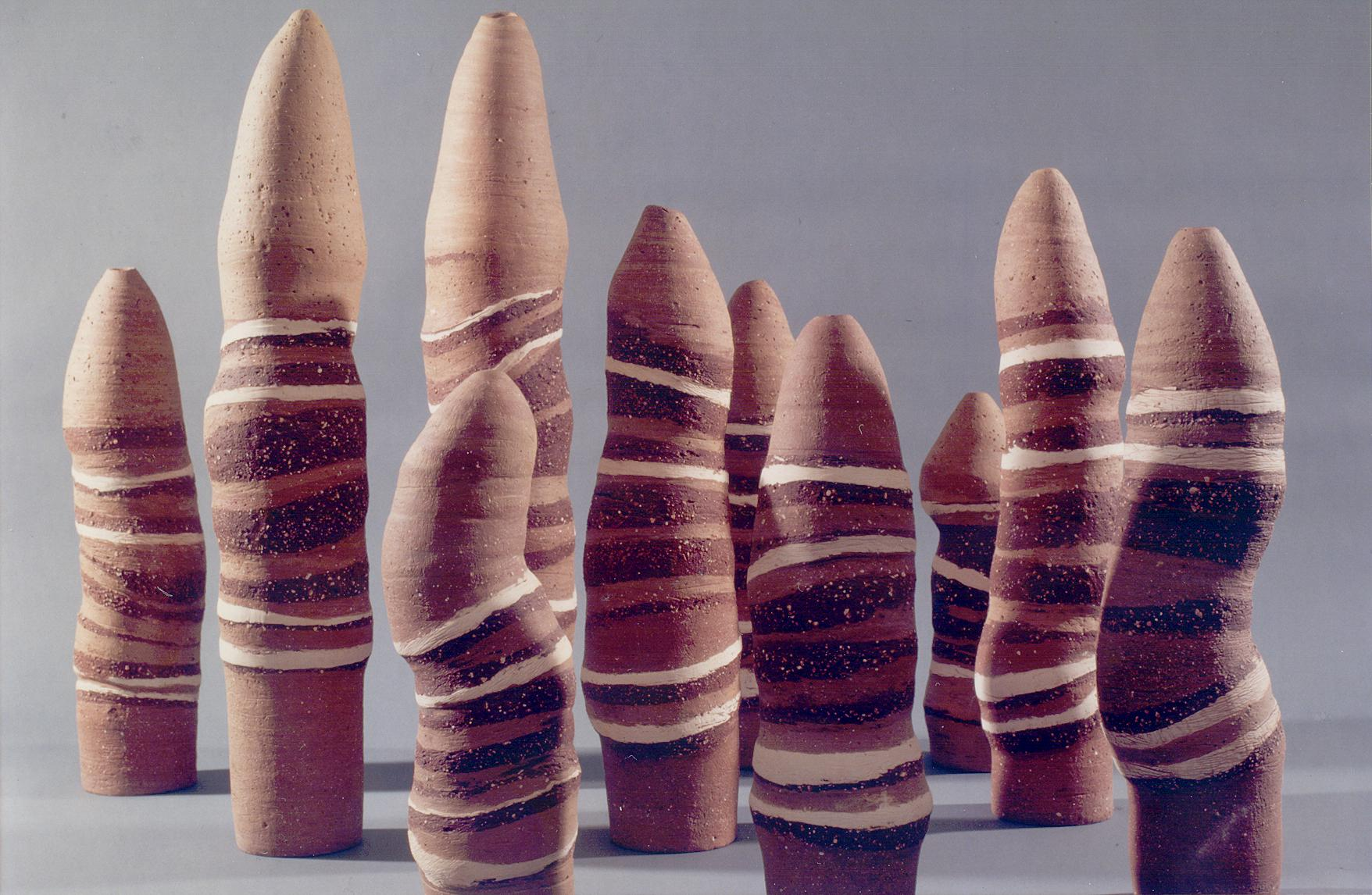
(untitled)

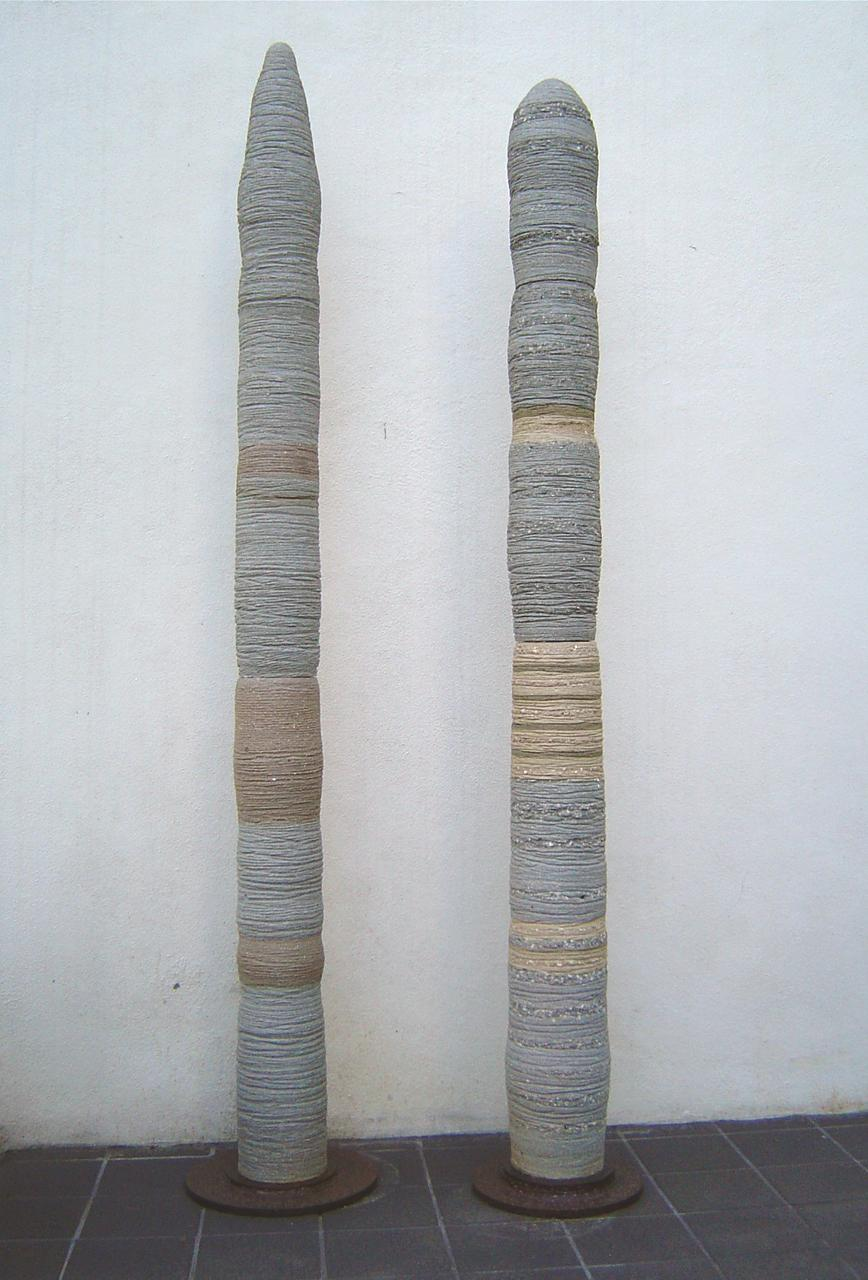
(untitled)

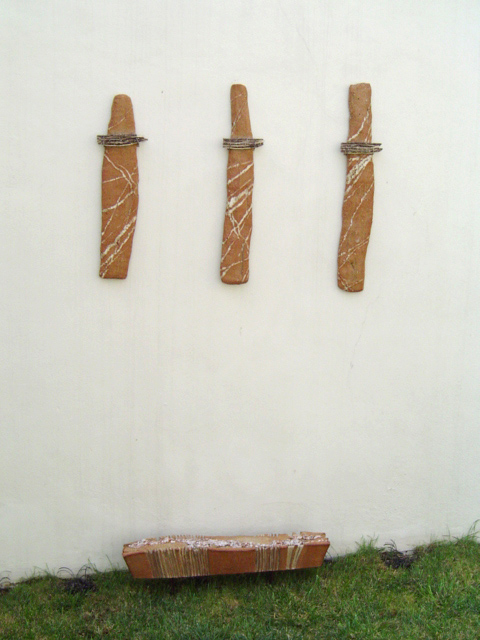
(untitled)

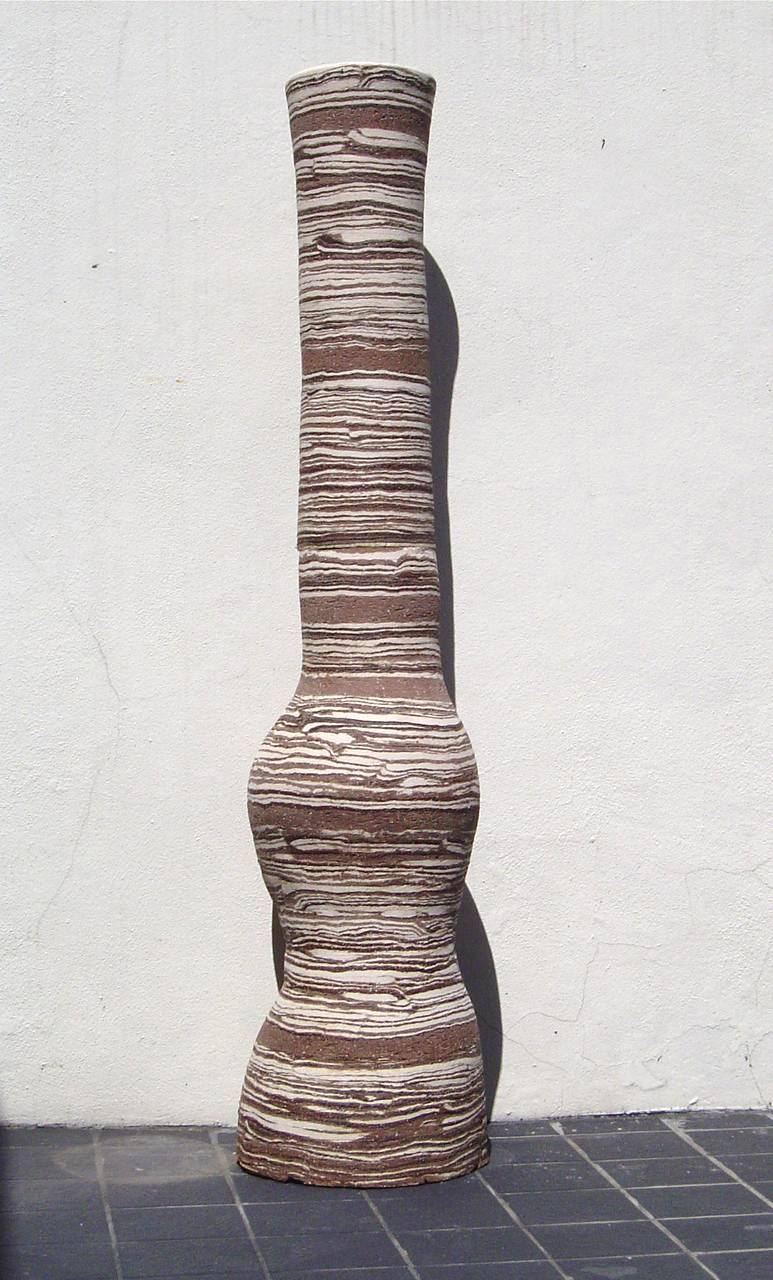
(untitled)

=== Plates ===
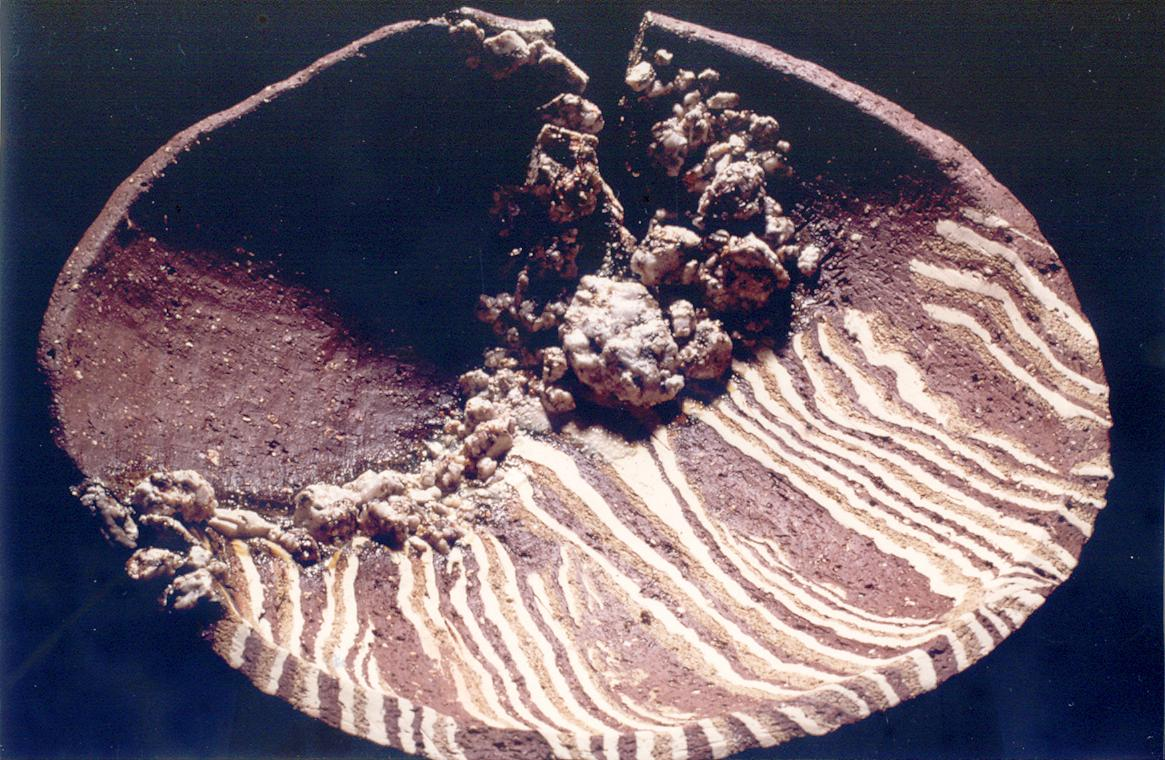
(untitled)

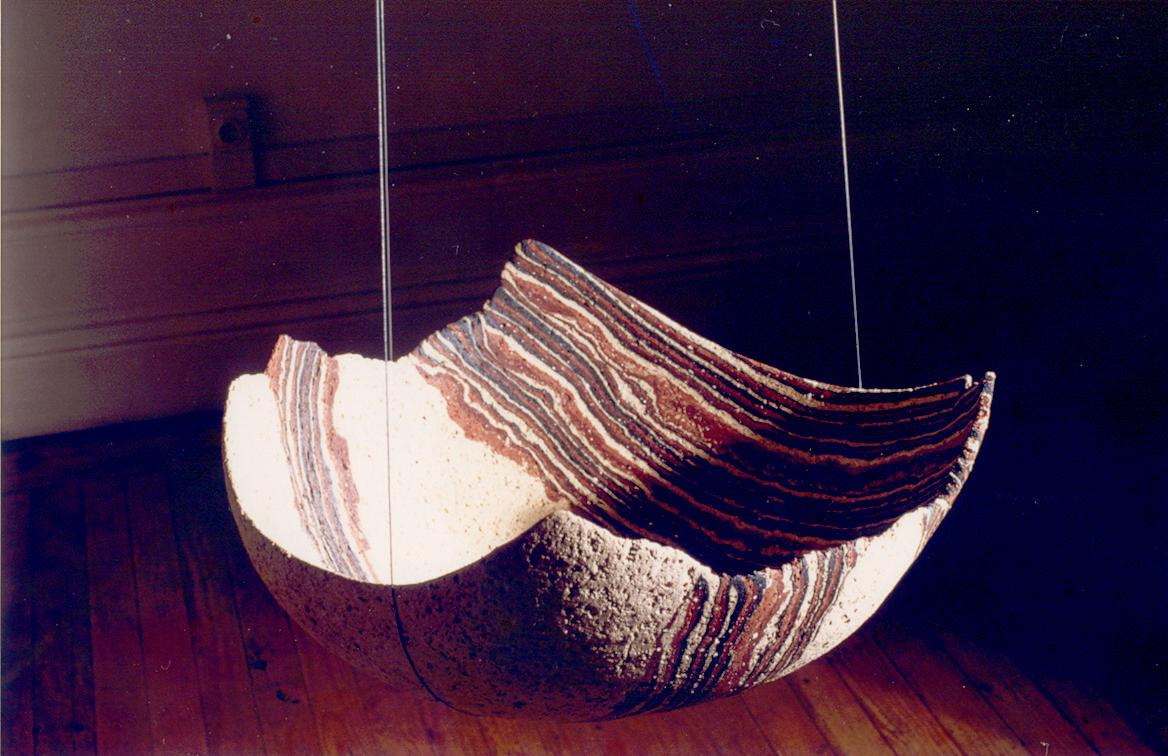
(untitled)

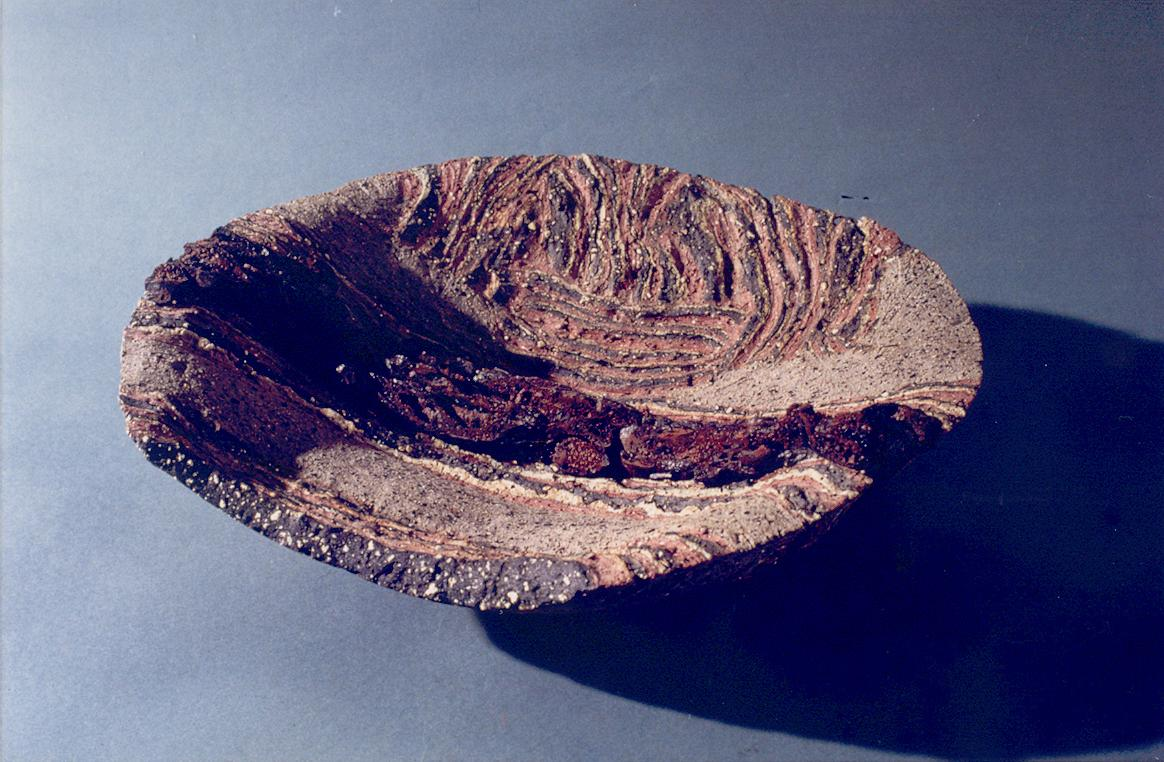
(untitled)

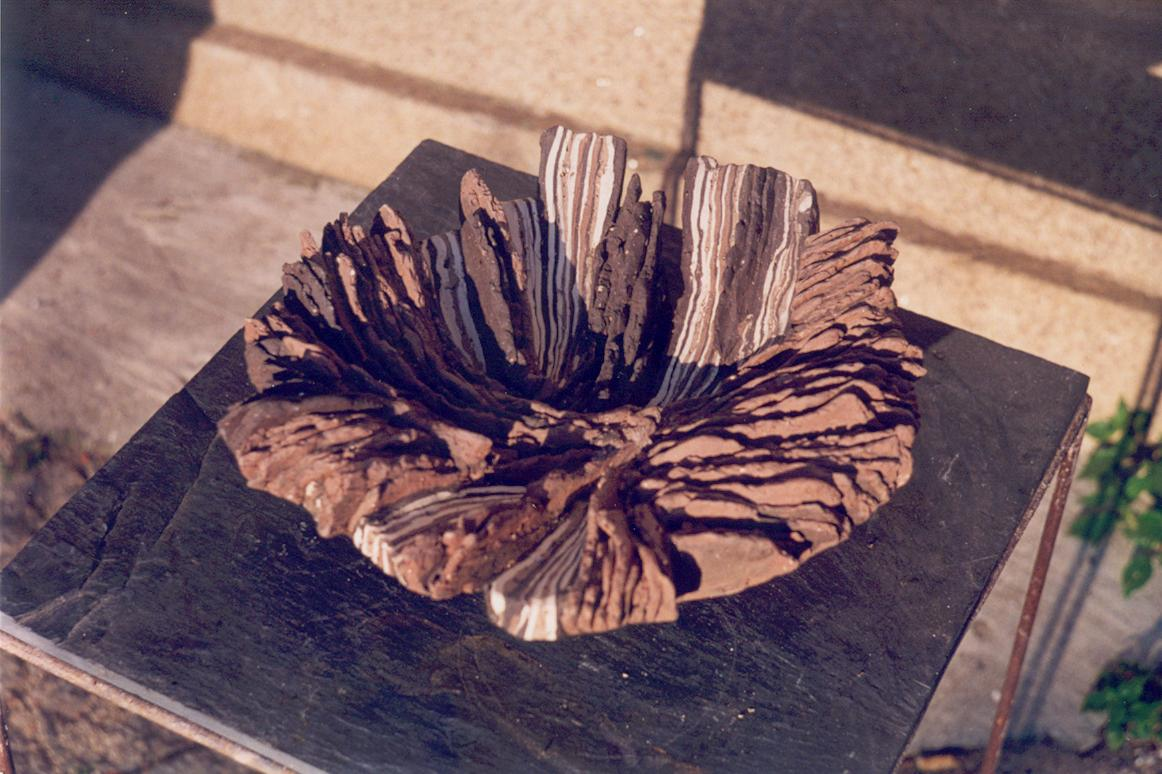
(untitled)

== Collective exhibitions ==
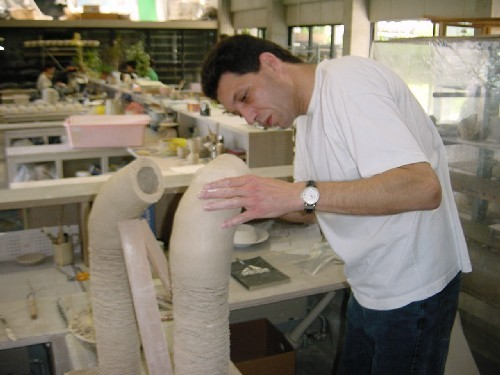
João Carqueijeiro in Atlier Maruo, 2001, Hondo, Japan

- 1986 – 10th Meeting of European Ceramists "Périgueux" (France)
- 1987 – Ceramic Art International Symposium at "Alcobaça" – Alcobaça (Portugal)
- 1988 – Modern Art Centre of Calouste Gulbenkian's Foundation – Lisbon (Portugal)
- 1988 – Contemporary Portuguese Ceramic Work "Leal Senado /Luís de Camões Museum" (Macao)
- 1988 – Árvore Gallery – Porto (Portugal)
- 1988 – "L’Europe Des Céramistes" (The Europe of Ceramic Artists) – Auxerre (France)
- 1989 – National Library – Lisbon (Portugal)
- 1989 – "Palácio dos Anjos" – Algés (Portugal)
- 1989 – "Bienal Internacional de Cerâmica de Aveiro" (International Ceramic Art Biennial) – Aveiro (Portugal)
- 1989 – "Cinq Jeunes Créateurs Portugais" (Five Young Portuguese Artists) – "Les Mureaux" (France)
- 1990 – "3 Jovens Ceramistas" (3 Young Ceramists) - Youth Foundation – Porto (Portugal)
- 1990 – International Meeting of Ceramic Arts – Vila Nova de Gaia (Portugal)
- 1990 – European Meeting of Arts, "Palais des Papes" – Avignon (France)
- 1991 – Magellan Gallery – Paris (France)
- 1991 – Árvore Gallery – Porto (Portugal)
- 1992 – Petrogal / Ceramic Sculpture Meeting – Porto (Portugal)
- 1994 – Arménio Losa Gallery – São Mamede Infesta (Portugal)
- 1995 – "Bienal Internacional de Cerâmica de Aveiro" (International Ceramic Art Biennial) - Aveiro (Portugal)
- 1995 – Eng. António de Almeida Foundation – Porto (Portugal)
- 1997 – "10 Artistas do Porto em Fafe" (10 Porto Artists at Fafe) Fafe (Portugal)
- 1997 – Eng. António de Almeida Foundation (U.C.) – Porto (Portugal)
- 1997 – "Silêncios/Stille" Symposium at Feital – Trancoso (Portugal)
- 1997 – Arménio Losa Gallery – São Mamede Infesta (Portugal)
- 1997 - Ao Quadrado Gallery – Santa Maria da Feira (Portugal)
- 1998 - Ceramic Art Symposium – Vila Nova de Cerveira – Portugal
- 1998 – Direction of a Ceramic Mural – Artists European Meeting - Paredes de Coura (Portugal)
- 1998 - "Silêncios/Stille" – Centro Cultural de Aveiro ( Cultural Center of Aveiro) – Aveiro (Portugal)
- 1998 – Direction and production of the Ceramic Mural of the NORTE COOP Building – São Mamede Infesta (Portugal)
- 1998 – "Silêncios/Stille", Ausstellung / Preetz (Germany)
- 1999 – Direction of a Raku Workshop and exhibition "Atmosfera" (Atmosphere) – Epicentro Gallery – Porto (Portugal)
- 1999 – "Encontro de Cerâmica Figurativa – Figurado" (Human Figure Ceramic Meeting ) – Pottery Museum of Barcelos - Barcelos (Portugal)
- 2000 – Direction and production of a Meeting of Shaped Plates – Porto (Portugal)
- 2000 – Gesto Coop. Gallery – Porto (Portugal)
- 2000 - A. M. I. Gallery – Porto (Portugal)
- 2001 – Participation on the Amakusa Ceramics Festival, Hondo (Japan), as guest artist, representing Portugal – Carrying through a workshop about Portuguese Traditional Tiling – Exposition of ceramic sculptures in the City Hall of Amakusa.
- 2003 – Coordination and post-Exhibition of the workshop in ceramics on the XIIBienal03 (Biennial) of Vila Nova de Cerveira
- 2003 – Presentation of two video-installations "EntreBarreiras" e "XIIBienal03 a preto e branco – Os Gestos_Os Espaços_As Mãos" (co-directing and co-editing with Cristina Leal)
- 2003 – Exhibition in the A.M.I. Gallery – Porto (Portugal)
- 2005 – Exhibition in the Bobogi Gallery – Aveiro (Portugal)
- 2006 - Exhibition in the AvizArte Gallery - Porto (Portugal)

== Individual exhibitions ==
- 1986 – "D" Gallery – Gondomar (Portugal)
- 1990 – Labirintho Gallery – Porto (Portugal)
- 1993 – Magellan Gallery – Paris (France)
- 1996 – Labirintho Gallery – Porto - (Portugal)
- 1996 – Aveiro City Hall Gallery – Aveiro (Portugal)
- 2000 – Epicentro Gallery - Porto (Portugal)
- 2001 - Pottery Museum of Barcelos - Barcelos (Portugal)

== Awards ==
- 1989 – 1st Prize in the II Art Exhibition-Small Size – Cooperativa Árvore – Porto (Portugal)
- 1989 – Honour Distinguished in the "Bienal Internacional de Cerâmica de Aveiro" (International Ceramic Art Biennial) – Aveiro (Portugal)
- 1991 – 1st Prize in Creative Ceramic Art – I.E.F.P. (Portugal)

== Collections ==
- Alcobaça City Hall Museum – Alcobaça (Portugal)
- Museu do Azulejo (Tile Museum) – Lisbon (Portugal)
- Luís de Camões Museum – (Macao)
- I. E. F. P. – Porto and Valença Centers (Portugal)
- Pottery Museum of Barcelos – Barcelos (Portugal)
- Amakusa City Hall – Hondo (Japan)
- Portuguese Embassy in Tokyo – Tokyo (Japan)
- Gallery of the North Delegation of AMI – Assistência Médica Internacional – Porto (Portugal)
- Museum of the Biennial of Cerveira – Vila Nova de Cerveira (Porto)

== See also ==
- Hans Coper
