= Galveias Palace =

Coordinates: 38°44′29.2″N 9°8′37.2″W

- Palácio Galveias (Portuguese)
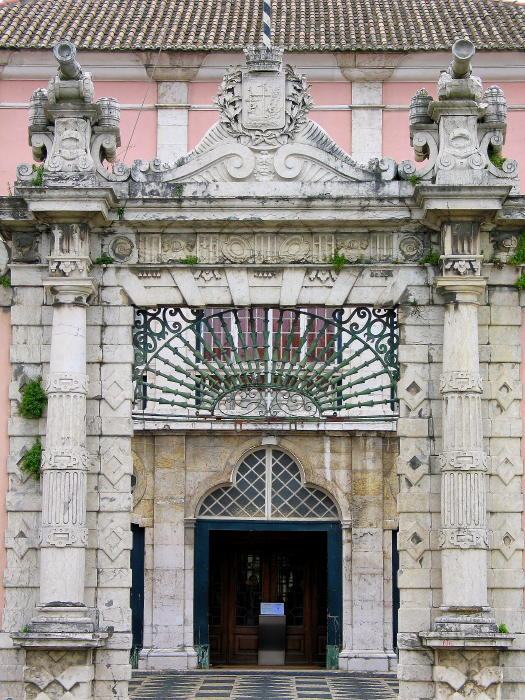
- Galveias Palace

- Location within Portugal
- Location: Lisbon, Portugal

Portuguese National Monument
- Official name: Quinta do General e Respectivo Jardim
- Type: Property of Interest

Galveias Palace (Portuguese: Palácio das Galveias) is a Portuguese palace located in Lisbon, Portugal, in Avenidas Novas freguesia.

== History ==
The palace dates back to the mid-17th century, when it was built as a country house for the Marquis of Távora. In 1759, due to the Távora affair, the entire Távora family was executed and the palace was confiscated by the Crown.

The name of the palace comes from its acquisition, in 1801, by D. João de Almeida de Melo e Castro, 5th Count of Galveias.

In 1928, the palace came into possession of the Lisbon Municipal Chamber, who installed there one of the city's earliest municipal libraries.

The palace is famous for being a good example of a 17th-century Portuguese nobleman's house, with the typical U-shaped layout.

== Sources ==
- Galeria do Palácio Galveias (In Portuguese)
- Biblioteca Municipal Central – Palácio Galveias (In Portuguese)
- Palácio das Galveias (In Portuguese)
