= Álvaro Perdigão =

Portuguese painter

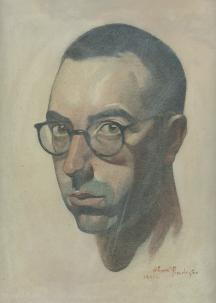
- Self-portrait
- Born: 22 May 1910; Lisbon, Portugal
- Died: 10 March 1994 (aged 83); Lisbon, Portugal
- Occupation: Artist

Álvaro Perdigão (22 May 1910 – 10 March 1994) was a Portuguese painter.

== Biography ==
Álvaro Perdigão was born in May 1910, in the same year of the establishment of the Portuguese Republic. In Setubal, a small town 50 km to the south of Lisbon, he attends the Bocage Secondary School. He starts studying Art under the supervision of painter Lázaro Lozano in 1917, when he was around seventeen years old, leaving in 1929.

Álvaro Perdigão’s apprenticeship takes him to the School of Fine Arts and to the National Conservatoire, where he attends a course in scenography. Whilst studying, he holds various jobs: designer at the Fiscalization Commission for the Urban Topographic department, between 1939 and 1948. However, he ends up dedicating most of his professional life to teaching. He is designated teacher of Technical Teaching at the Marquês de Pombal Industrial School in Lisbon, in 1948. He joins the staff of Casa Pia in Lisbon in 1950, having been invited by the school’s board to become the designated Painting Teacher, job he holds until 1980. Meanwhile, he meets art colleagues, such as the sculptors Martins Correia, Raul Xavier and Helder Baptista, amongst others. He also engages in volunteer work, teaching evening classes at the National Society of Fine Arts.

He begins his artistic career soon enough. In 1929, at the young age of nineteen he holds his first individual art exhibition, at the Clube Naval of Setubal. From then on, he keeps regular contact with his audience. During his career, his work is shown, in Portugal and abroad, both in individual and collective exhibitions. In 1951/1952, he becomes vice president of the Board of the National Society of Fine Arts, and in 1974 he joins the Parallel Group, together with António Carmo, João Hogan, Querubim Lapa, Gil Teixeira Lopes amongst others.

Álvaro Perdigão experimented and applied various painting techniques. His work is vast, showing oil painting as the predominant technique, even though he also produced drawings, water colours, ceramics, stained glass, engravings in various materials. His art shows a large spectrum of colours - greys, blues, greens, ochers, briques, yellows, browns, reds – spread in complex structured patches on the canvas; his canvases, prepared by the artist himself, aware made of thick linen in which the application of paint enabled an embossed texture.

It is important to highlight the main topic areas, vast and diversified, which the artist explored in his life’s work: the male and female figure, the natural landscape and still lives. Through his work, the artist expressed his vision and interpretation of the life of the common man in his daily chores. He died in Lisbon in 1994.

== Individual exhibitions ==
- 1929 – Clube Naval Setubalense
- 1930, 1931 – Liceu Bocage
- 1934 – Câmara Municipal de Coimbra
- 1936 – Galeria UP
- 1943 – Galeria Instanta, Lisboa 1951, 1961, 1962 (Monotipias e Óleos)
- 1963 – Sociedade Nacional de Belas-Artes
- 1961, 1969, 1971 – Galeria do Casino Estoril
- 1963 – Coliseu do Porto
- 1962, 1985 – Museu de Setúbal
- 1962, 1965 – Junta de Turismo da Costa do Sol, Estoril
- 1968 (Óleos), 1969 – Galeria Nacional de Arte 1969, 1970, 1971 (xilogravura) – Museu de Angra do Heroísmo
- 1969 – Galeria Interforma
- 1970 – Galeria o “Primeiro de Janeiro” (pintura e gravura), Coimbra; Caves Fonseca
- 1971, 1974 – Galeria do “Diário de Notícias”
- 1972 – Galeria Cema, Madrid
- 1973 – Clarkson Galleries, Edimburgo
- 1975 – Galeria Abel Salazar, Porto
- 1976, 1979, 1983, 1987 – (o Esconderijo e outras obras, óleos e escultura em rede de arame)– Galeria S. Francisco
- 1989 (Do Alto de St. Justa e outras Pinturas Mais) – Galeria S. Francisco
- 1991, 1993 (Velhas e Novas Realidades) – Galeria S. Francisco
- 1979 – Museu de Castelo Branco
- 1991 – Primeiro Aniversário da Galeria de Arte da Casa do Pessoal da RTP
- 2012 - Exposição antológica no Museu do Neo-Realismo, em Vila Franca de Xira

== Art in museums ==
- Biblioteca Museu Luz Soriano, Casa Pia
- Fundação Calouste Gulbenkian/C.A.M.
- Museu António Duarte, Caldas da Rainha
- Museu Armindo Teixeira Lopes, Mirandela
- Museu de Angra do Heroísmo, Ilha Terceira, Açores
- Museu de Arte Contemporânea
- Museu de José Malhoa, Caldas da Rainha
- Museu de Luanda
- Museu de Sines
- Museu de Setúbal
- Museu do Neo-Realismo
- Museu do Trabalho Michel Giacometti
- Museu Francisco Tavares Proença, Figueira da Foz
- Museu Machado de Castro
- Museu Santos Rocha, Figueira da Foz
