= Jorge Afonso =

Portuguese Renaissance painter

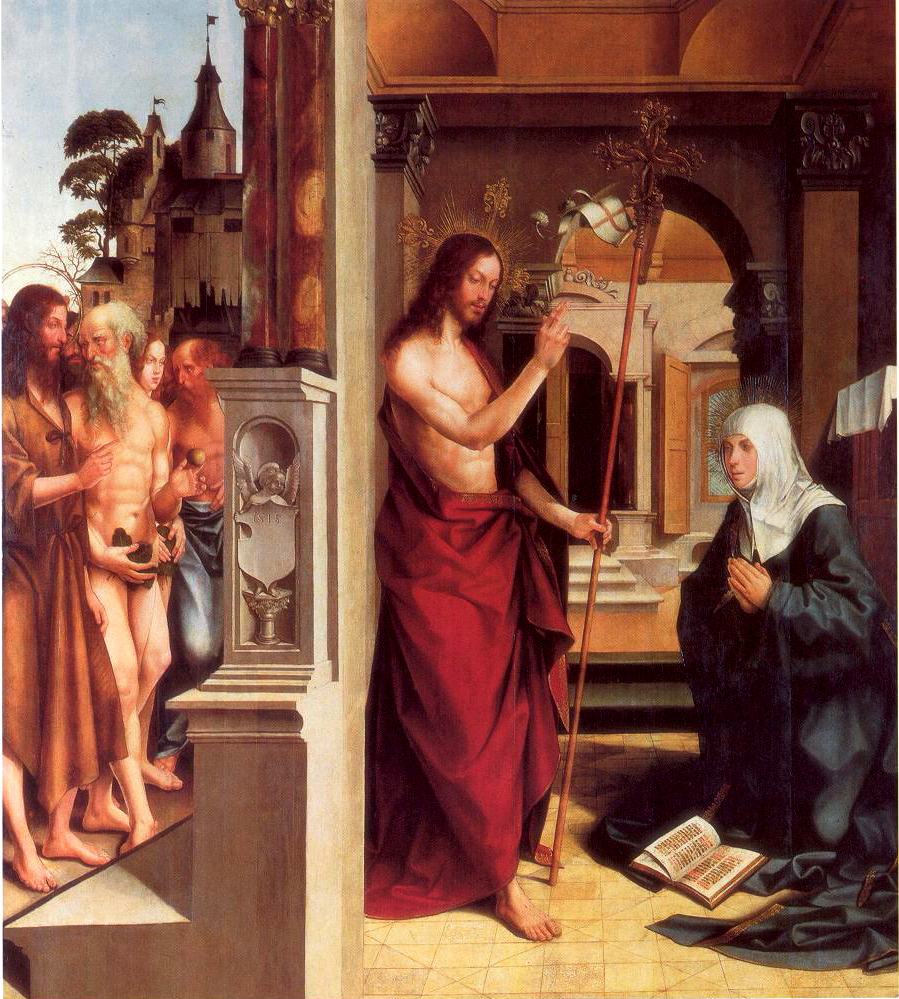
Jesus visiting Maria by Jorge Afonso (c. 1515), from the main altarpiece of the Madre de Deus church in Lisbon, now in the National Museum of Ancient Art.

Jorge Afonso (c. 1470 – 1540) was a noted Portuguese Renaissance painter.

Jorge Afonso was nominated royal painter in 1508 by King Manuel I and again in 1529 by John III. He was mainly based in Lisbon, with a workshop near the Igreja de São Domingos. A whole generation of Portuguese painters was educated in his workshop, including Cristóvão de Figueiredo, Garcia Fernandes, Gregório Lopes and Jorge Leal, among others.

The main painted altarpieces attributed to Jorge Afonso were commissioned by the old Queen Leonor, widow of King John II and sister of Manuel I. For the former Queen, Jorge Afonso painted the main altarpiece of the Convent of Madre de Deus, in Lisbon, in 1515. This magnificent altarpiece is now in the National Museum of Ancient Art, in Lisbon. Between 1520 and 1530, Jorge Afonso painted the 14 panels of the main altarpiece of the Monastery of Jesus, in Setúbal, again sponsored by Queen Leonor. The panels can be seen in the museum of the Monastery.

Jorge Afonso's workshop is also linked to the painted decoration of the walls of the Round Church of the Convent of Christ, in Tomar, executed in the 1530s.

== Notes ==
=== Bibliography ===
- Antunes, Vanessa; Candeias, António; Mirão, José; Carvalho, Maria L.; Dias, Cristina Barrocas; Manhita, Ana; Cardoso, Ana; Francisco, Maria J.; Lauw, Alexandra; Manso, Marta (March 2018). "Analytical characterization of the palette and painting techniques of Jorge Afonso, the great 16th century Master of Lisbon painting workshop". Spectrochimica Acta Part A: Molecular and Biomolecular Spectroscopy. 193: 264–275. doi:10.1016/j.saa.2017.12.027.
- Disney, A. R. (2009). A History of Portugal and the Portuguese Empire, vol. 1: Portugal. Cambridge University Press. ISBN 978-0-521-60397-3.
- Portuguese Renaissance painting (by Maria José Palla, João Augusto Laurentino).
