= Artur Varela =

Portuguese sculptor and painter

Artur Varela (1937–2017) was a Portuguese sculptor and painter whose work also included drawings, installations, film, collage, photography, cartoon and comic strips. He lived a substantial part of his life in Holland and several years in France, whose languages he spoke fluently, and where he exhibited widely, as well as Italy and Belgium. However, he remained viscerally connected to Portugal, reflected in the often irreverent, iconoclastic work he continued to exhibit in his native country.

== Early life ==
Born in Almodôvar, Portugal, after studying at the Escola Secundária Artística António Arroio, he attended the Lisbon School of Fine Arts (1959–1963). In common with other artists of his generation, he left Portugal during the Estado Novo, Salazar's dictatorship, and in 1963 enrolled at the Ecôle des Beaux-Arts in Paris where he attended the workshop of monumental sculpture led by Henri-Georges Adam. He moved to Holland in 1965, where he studied under Shinkichi Tajiri and Wessel Couzijn at Academie '63, later Ateliers ´63, in Haarlem.

== Sculpture ==
In his early sculptures he first worked with stainless steel, then wood, later producing "assemblages" in iron. In 1967 he began experimenting with chrome and, from the end of 1969 to 1971, minimal geometrical pieces, under the influence of the work of Carel Visser.

From 1965 he began exhibiting his sculptures regularly in Holland and elsewhere in Europe.

In 1965 he won the Van der Rijn Prize for young sculptors for his work Micromegas, exhibited at the Fodor Museum.

Individual exhibitions at that time included Galerie Artificia in Hemstede (1965), Galerie Waalkens, Finsterwolde (1967) and joint exhibitions, Galerie Sfinx, Amsterdam (67) and Galerie Swart, Amsterdam (1965). His work was also part of a number of important collective exhibitions, including Contour (66) at the Delft Prisenhof, Sonsbeek (66), Atelier 4, Stedelijk Museum, Amsterdam, two collective exhibition at the Groningen Museum, "Beeld en route" (67) and Vier-hoog Groningen (1968), as well as taking part in the V Bienniale de la Jeunesse Paris as part of the Dutch section (1967), the VI Mostra Internazionale di Scultura All'Aperto. Legnano, Italy (1968) and the Bienal de Middleheim Antwerpen, Belgium.

== Films, collages, objects, comic strips, photography and installations ==
1972 marked a departure from his sculptural work and a temporary return to Portugal. In March, 1973, a series of films, collages and other objects were exhibited at the Gallery of Modern Art of the Sociedade de Belas Artes de Lisboa.

Varela's films in Super 8 included "profiles" of artists. "Parodying the purism of conceptual art", the films were literally just that, the profiles of the artists Manuel Baptista, João Hogan and José Escada. Equally satirical, were his collages and the central piece of the exhibition, a shoeshine box entitled "Museum of Modern Art".

Following the Revolution of April 1974, and the opening up of Portuguese society his visits to Portugal became more frequent. He joined other artists who were seeking to push the boundaries of post revolutionary contemporary art, in exhibitions such as Abstracção-Hoje? (1975) and Mítologias Locais and Fotográfia na Arte Moderna Portuguesa (1977), all organized by the Sociedade Nacional de Belas-Artes, and in 1976 he was among a group of Portuguese artists selected for an exhibition on Contemporary Portuguese Art at the Musée d'Arte Moderne de la Ville de Paris and later at the Galleria Nazionale d'Arte Moderna in Rome, the same year he took part in another collective exhibition at the Galeria Quadrum entitled Alguns Aspectos da Vanguarda Portuguesa.

In 1977 he was one of the artists that took part in Alternativo Zero-Tendências Polémicas na Arte Portuguesa Contemporânea, organised by Ernesto de Sousa at the Galeria Nacional de Arte Moderna in Belém, Lisbon. Under the name Artur de Varela, he exhibited the following pieces: My Latin lover (1973), Museu de Arte Moderna (1973) Engraxador (1977).

In 1980, a provocative solo exhibition at Galeria Quadrum entitled Mare Portucalae on the theme of Portugal and Portuguese society produced such outrage that certain members of the public rampaged through the gallery and destroyed the exhibition.

== Painting ==
In the early 80s he began experimenting with bad painting using acrylic on canvas, work he exhibited in Galeria Quadrum in 1982 under the title "The germans are coming!" In 1983 he was among a group of artists, who in response to the pomp, ceremony and expense of the VII Exhibition of the Council of Europe based on the theme of the Portuguese Maritime Discoveries mounted their own exhibition without any subsidies, entitled História Trágico-Marítima at the Sociedade Nacional de Belas-Artes.

Moving towards more abstract figurative paintings, he continued to exhibit in Europe, Galerie Diagonale in Paris (1985), at the Westfries Museum (1986) and Mantz Gallery (1987) in Amsterdam in an exhibition entitled É Perigoloso Sporgersi, also exhibited at Galeria Ana Isabel in Lisbon. Collective exhibitions in the 80s included The Amsterdam Art Fair (1987) and the Contemporary Art Forum 89 in Lisbon, Portugal.

By then, he had moved back to Portugal and there followed a series of solo exhibitions: Galeria de Colares (1989), Galeria Nasoni in Porto (1992) and Atelelier Troufa Real (1992) with a series of abstract figurative paintings in oils entitled Penser Fait de Rides, followed by a collection of torsos exhibited at the Altamira gallery in 1993.

1993 also marked a return to satire with the donkey as a central theme in a series of drawings exhibited at Galeria Novo Século in 1994, and in 1996, in a work that took almost a year to complete entitled O mistério do enigma, he faithfully reproduced Portugal's national treasure, the polyptych, the Saint Vincent Panels, substituting the dignitaries, clergy and monarchs with donkeys, a work exhibited at the Sociedade Nacional de Belas Artes (1996) and Árvore 1997). This was followed by a series of painted tiles entitled the Fable of the Donkey and the Hen, shown at Galeria de Colares, (1998), Galeria Santa Clara, Coimbra (2002), Galeria Colares 2002.

In 2000, his super 8s were screened as part of an exhibition entitled Slow Motion commissioned by Miguel Wandschneider and organized by Art Attack at ESTGAD in Caldas da Rainha and in 2001, as part of an exhibition for the XII Bienal of the Communist Avante Festival he returned to a recurring theme of his the Sopeira (Maid) and the Senhor Doutor.

The same year he began working on his babies, a theme he would explore obsessively for the rest of his life in painting, drawings and sculpture and that were exhibited in various galleries. (Vrieden Van Bavink Gallery, Amsterdam, Galeria Novo Século Gallery, Lisbon, 2009, Microarte, Lisbon, 2010, Helder Alfaiete Gallery, Ericeira 20015.)

In 2004 a retrospective of the work of Artur Varela was held at the Sociedade Nacional de Belas Artes in Lisbon. It included paintings, sculptures, collages, photographs and film from as far back as 1964, including the polyptych O mistério do enigma.

In Portugal his satirical comic strips were regularly published in the fanzine Zundap, edited by José Feitor, which also published two solo comic books Zé Messias Deputado and Piolheira Blues. Besides his super 8s of the seventies, more recently he produced over a dozen short films under the title Bad Films using the pseudonym Arthur Van Der Hella.
