= Gregório Lopes =

Portuguese artist

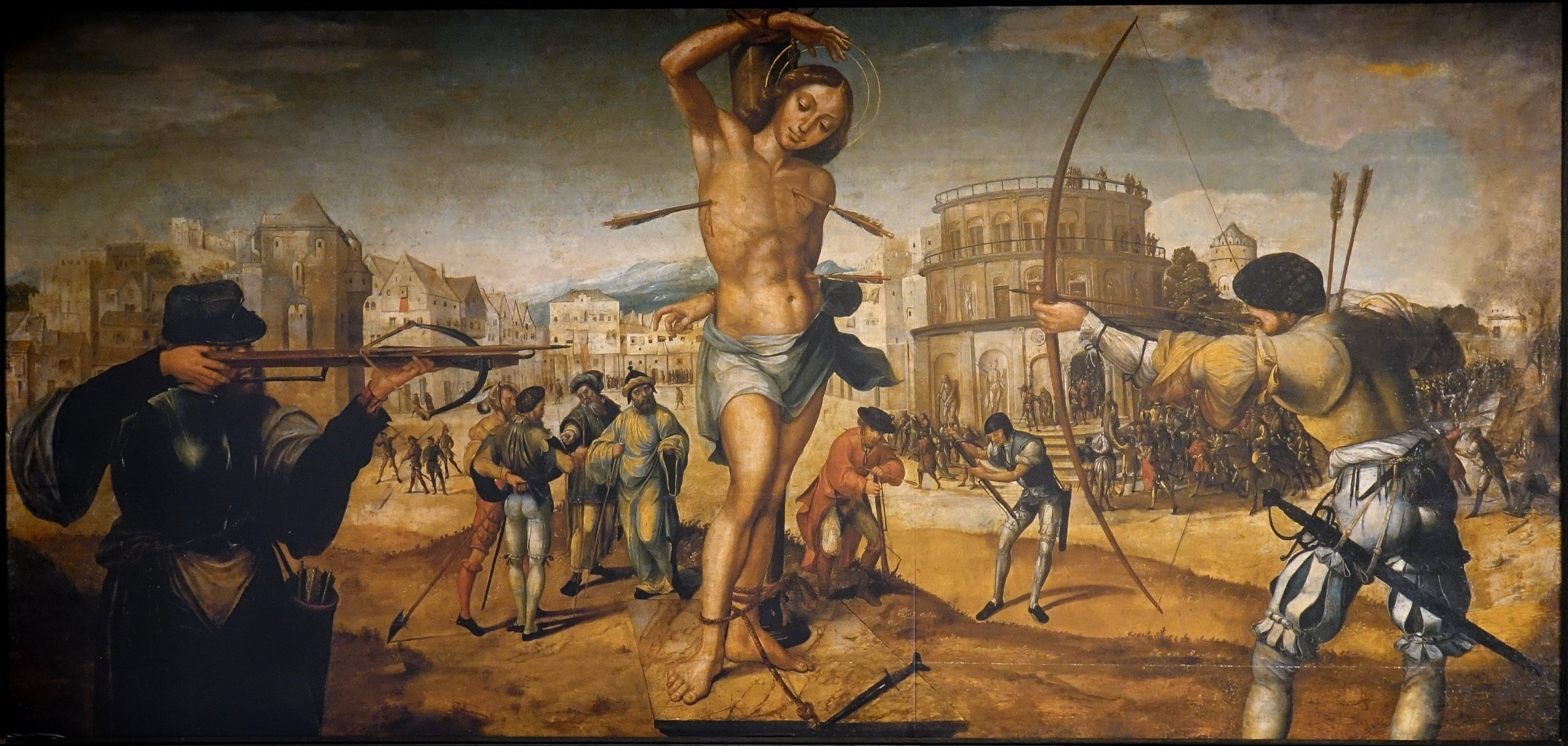
Martyrdom of St Sebastian by Gregório Lopes. This painting was originally executed for the Round Church of the Convent of Christ in Tomar (c.1536). National Museum of Ancient Art, Lisbon

Gregório Lopes (c. 1490 – 1550) was one of the most important Renaissance painters from Portugal.

== Biography ==
Gregório Lopes was educated in the workshop of Jorge Afonso, the court painter of King Manuel I. Later he himself became court painter for both Manuel I and for his successor, John III. In 1514, he married the daughter of Jorge Afonso, and in 1520 was knighted by Prince Jorge de Lencastre and entered the Order of Santiago.

The work of Gregório Lopes mainly consists of painted religious altarpieces for various churches and monasteries (Políptico do Convento do Paraíso and Retábulo de Santos-o-Novo) in central Portugal. Between 1520 and 1525 he worked (together with Jorge Leal) in painting altarpieces for the Saint Francis Convent of Lisbon (They also collaborated on Políptico da Capela do Salvador). Also in the 1520s he painted panels for the Church of Paraíso (Paradise), also in Lisbon. In his first fase, Gregório Lopes also worked in Sesimbra, Setúbal, and in the Monastery of Ferreirim, in this latter case together with Cristóvão de Figueiredo and Garcia Fernandes.

The painter moved in the 1530s to the city of Tomar, where he painted various panels for the Round Church of the Convent of Christ (1536–1539) and the main altarpiece of the Church of Saint John the Baptist (1538–1539). His last known works include altarpieces for the Convent of Santos-o-Novo in Lisbon (1540) and the Valverde Convent, near Évora (1545).

Many of Gregório Lopes' works can be seen in the National Museum of Ancient Art, in Lisbon. His son, Cristóvão Lopes (1516–1594), was also an artist and worked as a portrait painter for the Portuguese royal family.
