= Pedro Portugal =

Portuguese artist

- Born: 12 August 1963; Castelo Branco, Portugal
- Known for: painting
- Website: www.pedroportugal.pt

Pedro Portugal (Castelo Branco, 12 August 1963) is a Portuguese artist, with a wide production.

== Life ==
=== Early years ===
His first individual exhibition was in 1985, the year he finished his painting course. At this exhibition he presented small pastel and oil paintings, already pregnant with a figurative stylizing code or, more generically, a signal system that is reportable to comics and cartoons. Coming close graphics as these is not an indication of spontaneity or any kind of lenience of execution; quite the contrary, it is a-route through a meticulous composition effort, with an unwavering use of a perfected plan of contrasts and symmetries.

=== '90s ===
Pedro Portugal is, in fact, not just a painter, he is a cultural "agitator". By the end of the 80s his work became more ample and explicit in as far as its critical commentary was concerned. It focused on the artistic, cultural, social and political state of affairs. As a prime example of the works under this general concept, one should identify the eucalyptus planted upside-down in Lisbon airport's main roundabout, in 1991.

Throughout the 90s, the artist's horizon became more diversified in terms of workable materials. One could witness an emphasis on installations that were created for very specific purposes. In terms of social intentions, it funneled down to ecological concerns and political criticism. And, finally, in terms of his own activities' modes of promulgation, he supported the foundation of artists' associations and other structures of research and transmission of thought.

=== Explainism and later years ===
In 2007 he began the theoretical and artistic movement "Explainism" in collaboration with Pedro Proença.

Thus, the artist dedicates himself in a multifaceted way to the ever-present question of the end of painting and of its aesthetic cultural tradition.
