= Carlos Domingomes =

Portuguese film director and producer

Carlos AMD Gomes
- Born: Carlos A.M.D. Gomes; 7 May 1980 (age 46); Portugal
- Other name: Domingomes
- Occupations: Film director, film producer

Carlos AMD Gomes (aka Domingomes, 7 May 1980 in Le Puy-en-Velay, Clermont-Ferrand, France) is a Portuguese film director and producer. As an instructor, he worked with the education and training areas at schools in Lisbon: Instituto Superior de Educação e Ciências, Escola Secundária Sebastião e Silva, and Escola Secundária Artística António Arroio, where he began his teaching career on film, video, photography, and sound.

== Biography ==
He has an MFA in Audiovisual & Multimedia from the ESCS in Lisbon, and graduated from the ESTC (Escola Superior de Teatro e Cinema) (Portuguese National School of Theater and Cinema) in Amadora. In 2002 he shot his first medium-length film, entitled Lá em Cima Bem Perto do Céu ("Up There, Close to Heaven"), a fictionalised documentary set in the Portuguese countryside with octogenarian actors. The film earned several national awards and was televised by National Television RTP.

He also received several awards with other works: "Biodiversidade em Estilo"—1st Prize at the CINEECO Festival Extension in Lisbon, 2009; Equally Different—1st Prize at the Grand Prix Europe Festival in Berlin, Germany, 2007; 5 F's—prize from the City of Guarda, and launch of a DVD edition in 2005; Up There, Close to Heaven—1st Prize at the ESAAA's Third Festival, Honour Mention at Ovarvídeo in 2003, and televised by RTP; City on the Move—won the 3rd VideoRun Award in Lisbon, and was shown on the TV channel SIC Radical in 2003.

== Filmography ==
=== Fiction ===
- Acredita- "Believe" (2010)
- Deja Vu (2006)
- 5 F's - Fria, Farta, File, Forte, Formosa - "Cold, Satisfied, Faithful, Strong, Beautiful" (2004)
- Morreste-me - "You died to Me" (2004)
- Lá em Cima Bem Perto do Céu - "Up There, Close to Heaven" (2003)
- CidadEMovimento - "City on the Move" (2003)
- Guardicães - "GuarDogs" (2003)

=== Documentaries ===
- Au Revoir, Portugal! - "Goodbye, Portugal" 5 episodes (2009)
  - O Passador de Homens
  - O Salto
  - Ganhar a Vida
  - O regresso
  - Au Revoir
- "Biodiversidade em Estilo!" - "Biodiversity in Style!" (2009)
- Surdos - "Deaf" (2009)
- CTJA Histórias e Memórias - "Joaquim De Almeida's Theater Stories and Memories" (2007)
- CTJA Gosto de ser Grande -" Joaquim De Almeida's Theater likes to be Big" (2006)
- CTJA Tempo de Cultura - "Joaquim De Almeida's Theater Time of Culture" (2005)
