= Wind power by country =

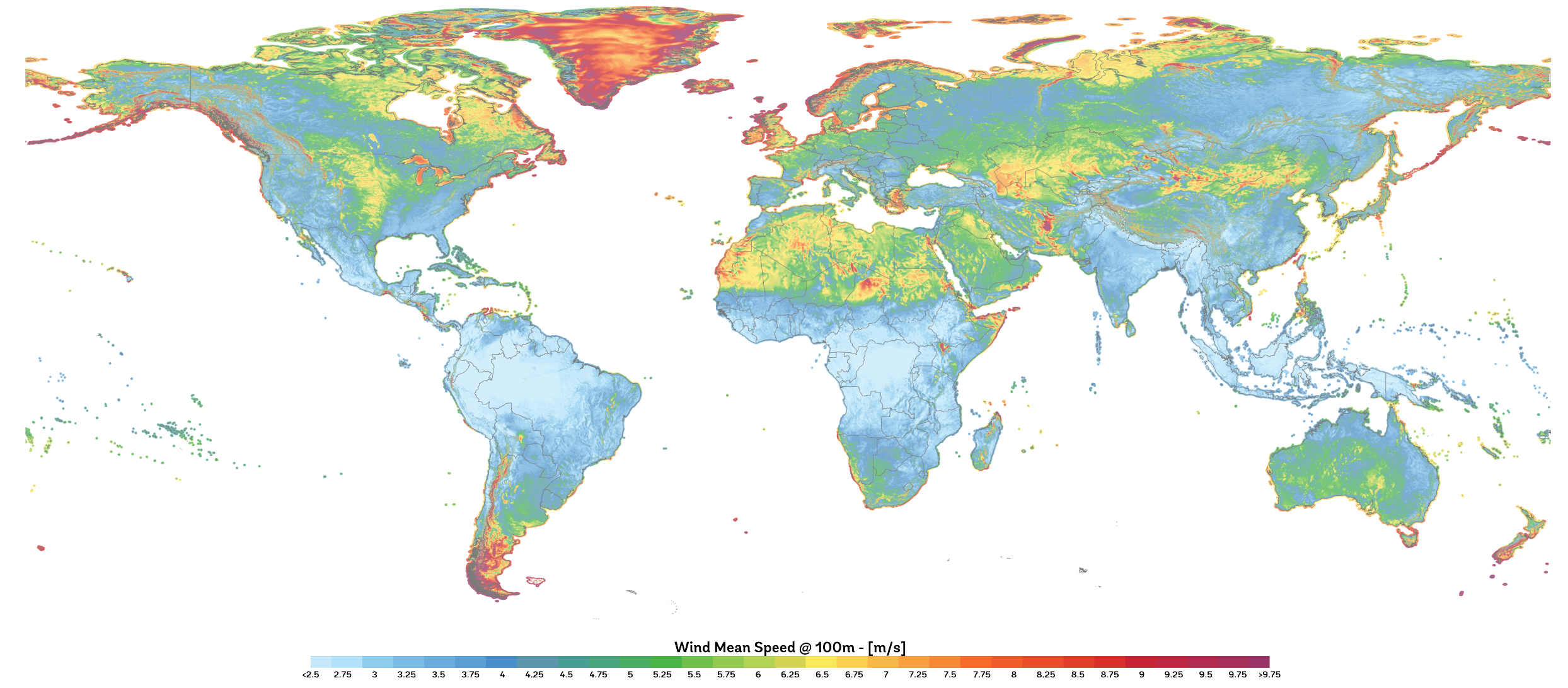
Global map of wind speed at 100 m above surface level

The worldwide total cumulative installed electricity generation capacity from wind power has increased rapidly since the start of the third millennium, and as of the end of 2025, it amounts to about 1300 GW. Since 2010, more than half of all new wind power was added outside the traditional markets of Europe and North America, mainly driven by the continuing boom in China and India. China alone had over 40% of the world's capacity in 2023.

Wind power is used on a commercial basis in more than half of all the countries of the world. Denmark produced 58% of its electricity from wind in 2023, a larger share than any other country. Latvia's wind capacity grew by 75%, the largest percent increase in 2022.

In November 2018, wind power generation in Scotland was higher than the country's electricity consumption during the month. Wind power's share of worldwide electricity usage in 2023 was 7.8%, up from 7.3% from the prior year. (Note: Wind was 2307 TWh out of 29,562 TWh total in 2023, compared to 2101 TWh out of 28,850 TWh total in 2022.) In Europe, wind was 12.3% of generation in 2023. In 2018, upcoming wind power markets rose from 8% to 10% across the Middle East, Latin America, South East Asia, and Africa.

== Generation by country ==
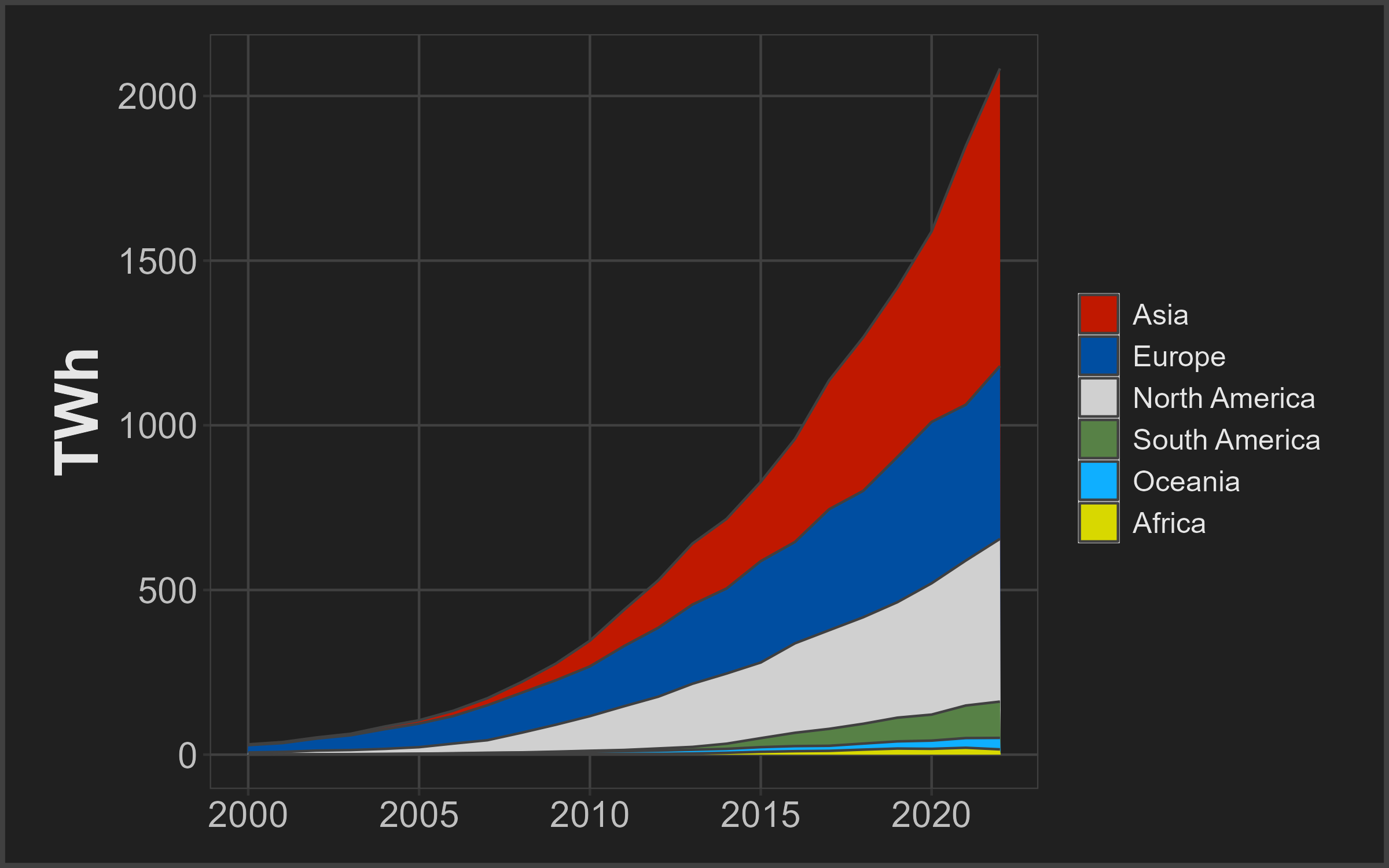
Yearly wind generation by continent

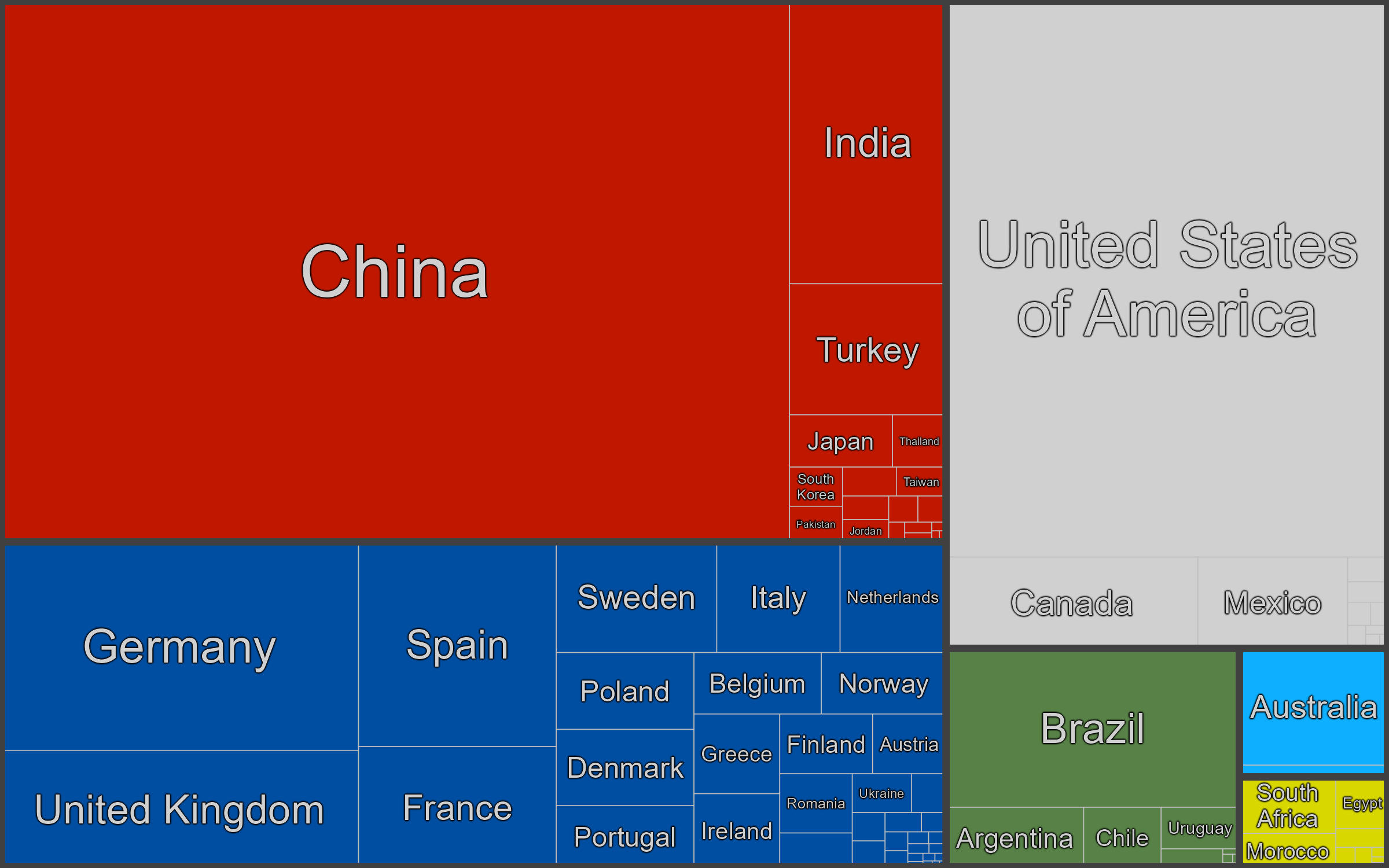
Wind generation by country, 2021

Number of countries with wind
capacities in the gigawatt-scale

View chart definition.
Growing number of wind gigawatt-markets
Over 1 GW
- 2025	(Uzbekistan)
  2023	(Croatia)	(Lithuania)	(New Zealand)	(Peru)
  2022	(Kazakhstan)
  2021	(Taiwan)	(Vietnam)
  2020	(Russia)
  2019	(Argentina)	(Ukraine)
  2018	(Pakistan)	(Egypt)	(Thailand)
  2017	(Morocco)	(Norway)
  2016	(Chile)	(Uruguay)	(South Korea)
  2015	(South Africa)	(Finland)
  2012	(Mexico)	(Romania)
  2011	(Brazil)	(Belgium)
  2010	(Austria)	(Poland)	(Turkey)
  2009	(Greece)
  2008	(Republic of Ireland)	(Australia)	(Sweden)
  2006	(Canada)	(France)
  2005	(United Kingdom)	(China)	(Japan)	(Portugal)
  2004	(Netherlands)	(Italy)
  1999	(Spain)	(India)
  1997	(Denmark)
  1995	(Germany)
  1986	(United States)
Over 10 GW
- 2024	(Poland)
  2023	(Netherlands)
  2022	(Australia)
  2021	(Turkey)	(Sweden)
  2018	(Italy)
  2016	(Brazil)
  2015	(Canada)	(France)
  2013	(United Kingdom)
  2009	(India)
  2008	(China)
  2006	(United States)	(Spain)
  2002	(Germany)
Over 100 GW
- 2019	(United States)
  2014	(China)

The following table lists this data for each country:

- total generation from wind in terawatt-hours,
- percent of that country's generation that was wind,
- total wind capacity in gigawatts,
- percent growth in wind capacity, and
- the wind capacity factor for that year.

Data are sourced from Ember and refer to the year 2025 unless otherwise specified. The table only includes countries with more than 0.1 TWh of generation.

Country	Gen (TWh)	% gen.	Cap. (GW)	% cap. growth	Cap. fac.
World	2711.90	8.55	1291.23	14.0	24%
China	1135.43	10.73	640.63	22.9	20%
United States	464.39	10.27	158.83	4.1	33%
Germany	136.03	27.18	77.81	7.0	20%
Brazil	117.58	15.67	34.87	5.9	38%
India	103.98	5.00	54.51	13.2	22%
United Kingdom	85.84	29.37	33.40	3.9	29%
Spain	58.76	20.40	33.30	3.5	20%
Canada	51.48	7.89	17.74	2.0	33%
France	46.46	8.15	25.65	5.8	21%
Turkey	39.42	11.14	14.78	14.8	30%
Australia	39.29	13.70	16.35	5.1	27%
Sweden	38.90	22.84	17.38	3.3	26%
Netherlands	33.70	24.97	11.78	0.7	33%
Poland	23.98	13.90	10.60	4.4	26%
Finland	22.58	27.44	9.38	12.2	27%
Italy	21.48	8.11	13.57	4.7	18%
Mexico	21.38	5.99	7.51	0.0	32%
Denmark	20.28	58.73	7.55	0.5	31%
Argentina	18.62	12.16	4.50	4.2	47%
Vietnam	14.37	4.64	6.24	1.0	26%
Portugal	13.68	26.75	5.61	0.2	28%
Norway	13.58	8.44	5.16	0.0	30%
Belgium	13.39	20.02	5.85	3.7	26%
Japan	12.85	1.25	6.24	6.5	24%
Greece	12.08	20.86	5.71	6.3	24%
Taiwan	12.00	4.15	4.52	15.6	30%
Ireland	11.76	38.00	5.13	3.9	26%
Chile	11.58	13.08	5.88	24.6	22%
South Africa	11.32	4.66	4.33	25.9	30%
Egypt	9.30	3.78	3.03	37.7	35%
Austria	8.31	11.34	4.29	4.9	22%
Morocco	6.74	15.27	2.45	2.5	31%
Romania	5.97	11.99	3.28	5.8	21%
Kazakhstan	5.83	4.71	1.91	25.7	35%
Uruguay	4.85	40.62	1.52	0.0	36%
Pakistan	4.46	2.52	1.85	0.0	28%
New Zealand	4.22	9.74	1.26	0.0	38%
Uzbekistan	4.00	4.61	1.65	230.0	28%
Lithuania	3.98	44.82	2.51	37.2	18%
Russia	3.64	0.31	2.88	12.1	14%
South Korea	3.64	0.58	2.45	8.4	17%
Thailand	3.41	1.81	1.54	0.0	25%
Croatia	3.14	21.36	1.38	6.2	26%
Kenya	2.30	16.38	0.44	0.0	60%
Peru	2.11	3.49	1.34	30.1	18%
Kuwait	1.86	2.08	0.01	0.0	
Jordan (2024)	1.75	7.39	0.63	0.0	32%
Saudi Arabia (2024)	1.59	0.35	0.40	0.0	45%
Costa Rica	1.55	12.10	0.44	10.0	40%
Serbia	1.47	4.01	0.80	33.3	21%
Philippines	1.46	1.19	0.52	18.2	32%
Dominican Republic	1.42	6.26	0.48	11.6	34%
Bulgaria	1.32	3.48	0.71	0.0	21%
Iran	1.25	0.32	0.38	0.0	38%
Estonia	1.15	18.58	0.71	2.9	18%
Ethiopia	1.10	3.30	0.50	25.0	25%
Panama (2024)	0.96	7.15	0.34	0.0	32%
Sri Lanka	0.93	5.39	0.27	0.0	39%
Honduras (2024)	0.75	6.01	0.24	0.0	36%
Hungary	0.60	1.49	0.32	0.0	21%
Czech Republic	0.57	0.75	0.37	2.8	18%
Nicaragua (2024)	0.56	12.39	0.19	0.0	34%
Mongolia	0.54	5.57	0.16	0.0	39%
Indonesia (2024)	0.47	0.13	0.15	0.0	36%
Luxembourg	0.47	30.52	0.23	9.5	23%
Israel	0.46	0.56	0.35	0.0	15%
Belarus	0.41	0.89	0.12	0.0	39%
Senegal (2024)	0.41	5.37	0.16	0.0	29%
Kosovo	0.39	6.64			
Bosnia and Herzegovina	0.37	2.55	0.24	9.1	18%
Guatemala (2024)	0.37	2.34	0.11	0.0	38%
Tunisia	0.33	1.48	0.25	0.0	15%
North Macedonia	0.30	4.23	0.10	42.9	34%
Jamaica (2024)	0.29	5.89	0.10	0.0	33%
Bolivia	0.28	2.05	0.14	0.0	23%
Montenegro	0.28	11.38	0.12	0.0	27%
Latvia	0.23	3.63	0.13	0.0	20%
Moldova	0.23	7.93	0.25	56.3	11%
Puerto Rico	0.23	1.17	0.13	0.0	20%
Cyprus	0.21	3.55	0.17	6.3	14%
El Salvador	0.20	3.10	0.05	0.0	46%
United Arab Emirates (2024)	0.20	0.11	0.11	10.0	21%
Ecuador	0.19	0.52	0.07	0.0	31%
Colombia	0.15	0.17	0.03	0.0	57%
Aruba (2024)	0.14	14.00	0.03	0.0	53%
Switzerland	0.14	0.22	0.11	10.0	15%
Mauritania (2024)	0.10	4.83	0.14	0.0	8%
Oman	0.10	0.19	0.05	0.0	23%

== Americas ==
Wind power installed capacity in Argentina

=== Argentina ===
Wind power in Argentina is considered to have a vast potential due to the exceptionally high wind speed, especially in the Patagonia region. For most of the country's history, wind power was largely unexploited because it was not profitable nor possible, considering there were no transmission lines that could connect the Patagonia region with the National Interconnected System. This issue was solved by the construction of the Choele-Choel-Puerto Madryn high voltage line.

Wind farm construction increased exponentially also due to tax benefits, such as RIGI.

Each year, Argentina breaks a new wind power production record, which has become the country's largest renewable energy as more companies choose to power their factories using strictly renewable energy, such as Techint and Loma Negra.

== Asia ==
Wind power in Asia is an important component in the Asian energy industry and one of the key sources of renewable energy in the region. As of April 2016, the installed capacity of wind power in Asia (excluding the Middle East) totalled 175,831 MW. Asia is the fastest growing region in terms of wind energy, having increased its installed capacity by 33,858 MW in 2005 (a 24% increase over 2014). China, with 145,362 MW of installed capacity, is the world's largest generator of electricity from wind energy. India is the second largest in Asia with an installed capacity of 25,088 MW. Other key countries include Japan (1,394 MW), Taiwan (188 MW), South Korea (173 MW) and the Philippines (33 MW).

== Africa ==
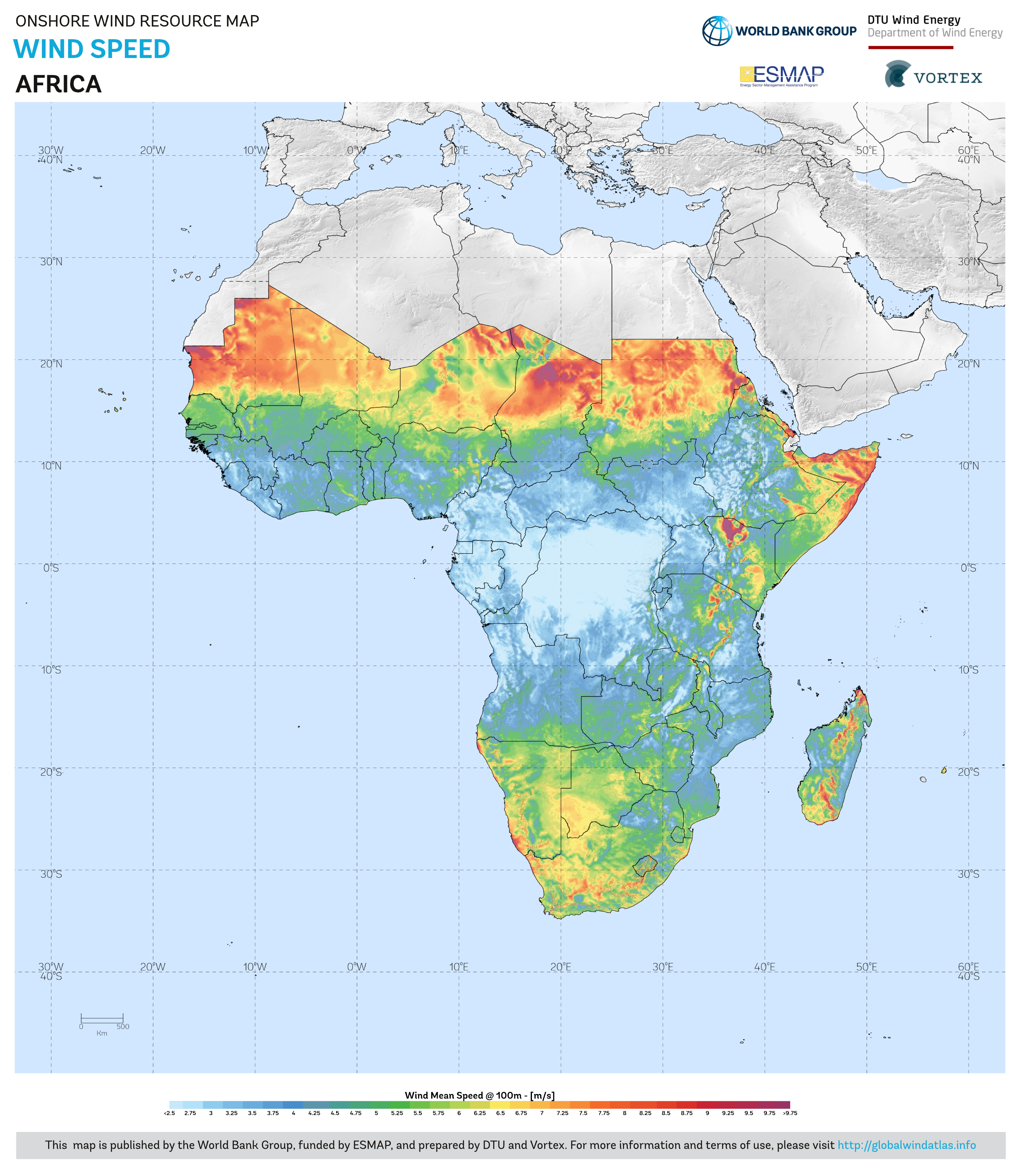
Wind speed in Sub-Saharan Africa

Total Wind energy capacity 2015–2024 (MW)
2015	2016	2017	2018	2019	2020	2021	2022	2023	2024
3,320	3,831	4,578	5,471	5,528	6,514	6,909	7,745	8,654	9,233

The Koudia Al Baida Farm in Morocco, is the largest wind farm in the continent. Two other large wind farms are under construction in Tangier and Tarfaya.

Kenya is building a wind farm, the Lake Turkana Wind Power (LTWP), in Marsabit County. As Africa's largest wind farm, the project will increase the national electricity supply while creating jobs and reducing greenhouse gas emissions. LTWP is planned to produce 310 MW of wind power at full capacity.

In January 2009, the first wind turbine in West Africa was erected in Batokunku, a village in The Gambia. The 150 kilowatt turbine provides electrical power for the 2,000-person village.

The South African REIPPP has resulted in several wind farms already in commercial operation in the country. These wind farms are currently in operation in the provinces of the Eastern, Northern and Western Cape. It is estimated that 10 farms are already under construction or in operation, with 12 more being approved with the 4th Round of the REIPPP.

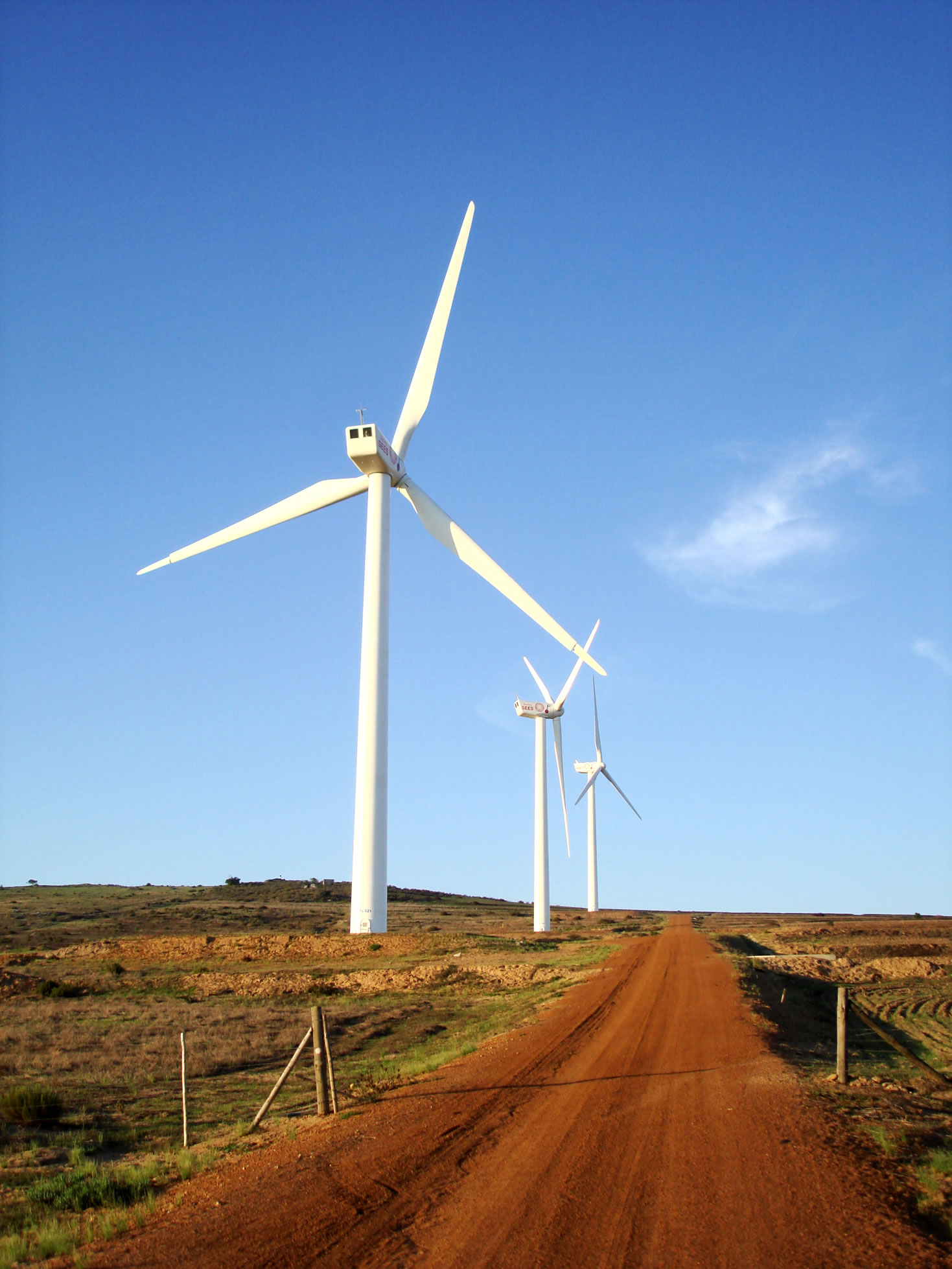
Darling Wind Farm in South Africa

== Europe ==
As of 2023, Europe had a total installed wind capacity of 255 gigawatts (GW). In 2017, a total of 15,680 MW of wind power was installed, representing 55% of all new power capacity, and the wind power generated 336 TWh of electricity, enough to supply 11.6% of the EU's electricity consumption.

In Q4 2023, wind power exceeded coal in European electricity generation for the first time, generating 193 TWh compared to coal's 184 TWh. Despite wind installation challenges, wind generation rose by 20% from 2022. New policies aim to further boost wind power in 2024.

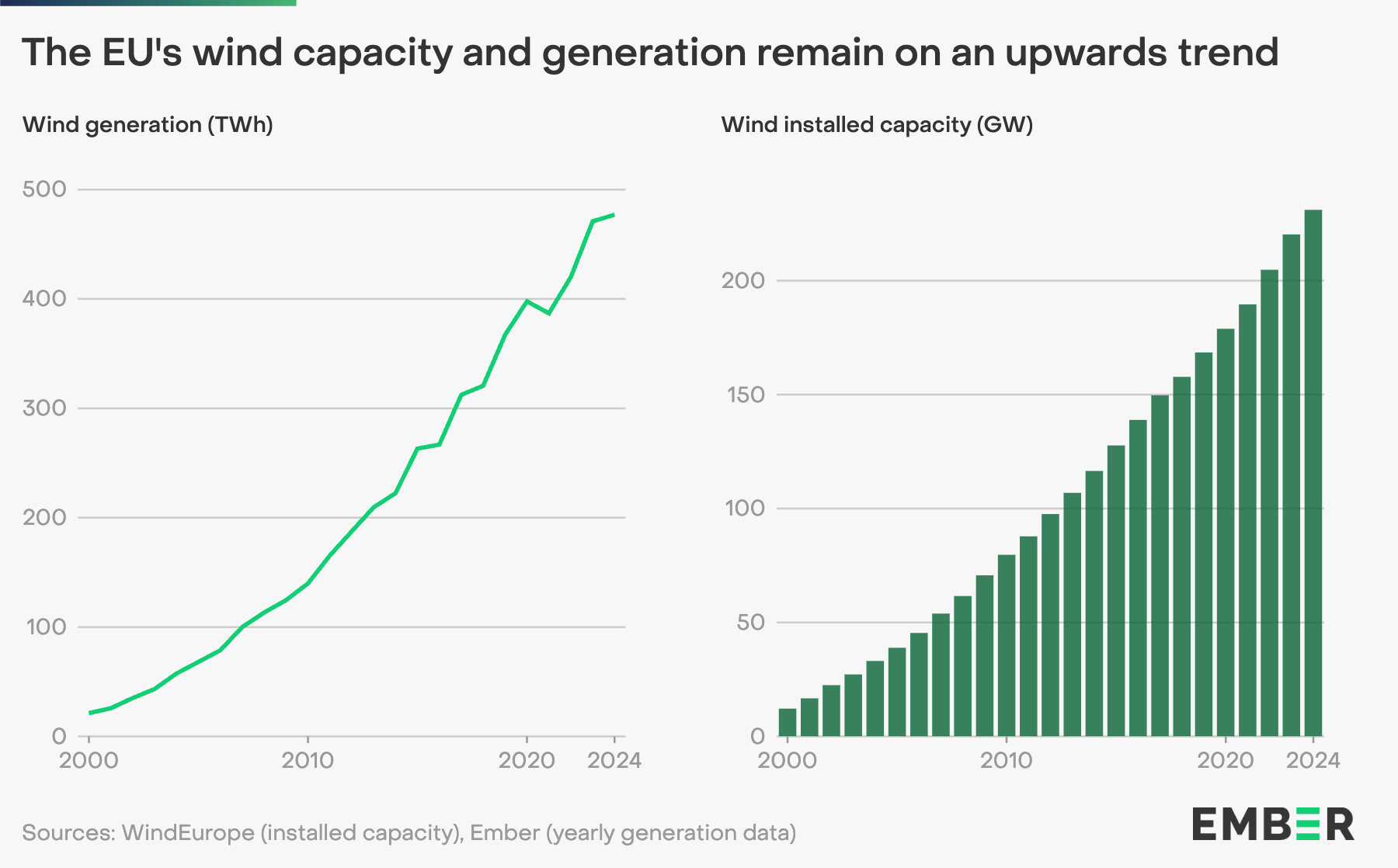
As of 2024, the EU's wind capacity and generation remain on an upwards trend.

WindEurope (formerly known as the European Wind Energy Association) has estimated that 230 gigawatts of wind capacity will be installed in Europe by 2020, consisting of 190 GW onshore and 40 GW offshore. This would produce 14-17% of the EU's electricity, avoiding 333 million tonnes of CO_{2} per year and saving Europe €28 billion a year in fuel costs.

Research from a wide variety of sources in various European countries shows that support for wind power is consistently about 80 per cent among the general public.

By 2020, 56% wind power penetration was achieved in Denmark, 36% in Lithuania, 35% in Ireland, 23% in Portugal, 23% in Germany, 20% in Spain, 18% in Greece, 16% in Sweden, 15% (avg) in the EU.

== See also ==
- Wind power in Asia
- Wind power in Africa
- Wind power in Europe
