= Wind power in Europe =

As of 2025, Europe had a total installed wind capacity of 304 gigawatts (GW), 265 GW onshore and 39 GW offshore.

The sector has seen significant growth in recent years. In Q4 2023, wind power exceeded coal in European electricity generation for the first time, generating 193 Terawatt-hour (TWh) compared to coal's 184 TWh.Despite wind installation challenges, capacity and generation have remained on a steady upward trend.

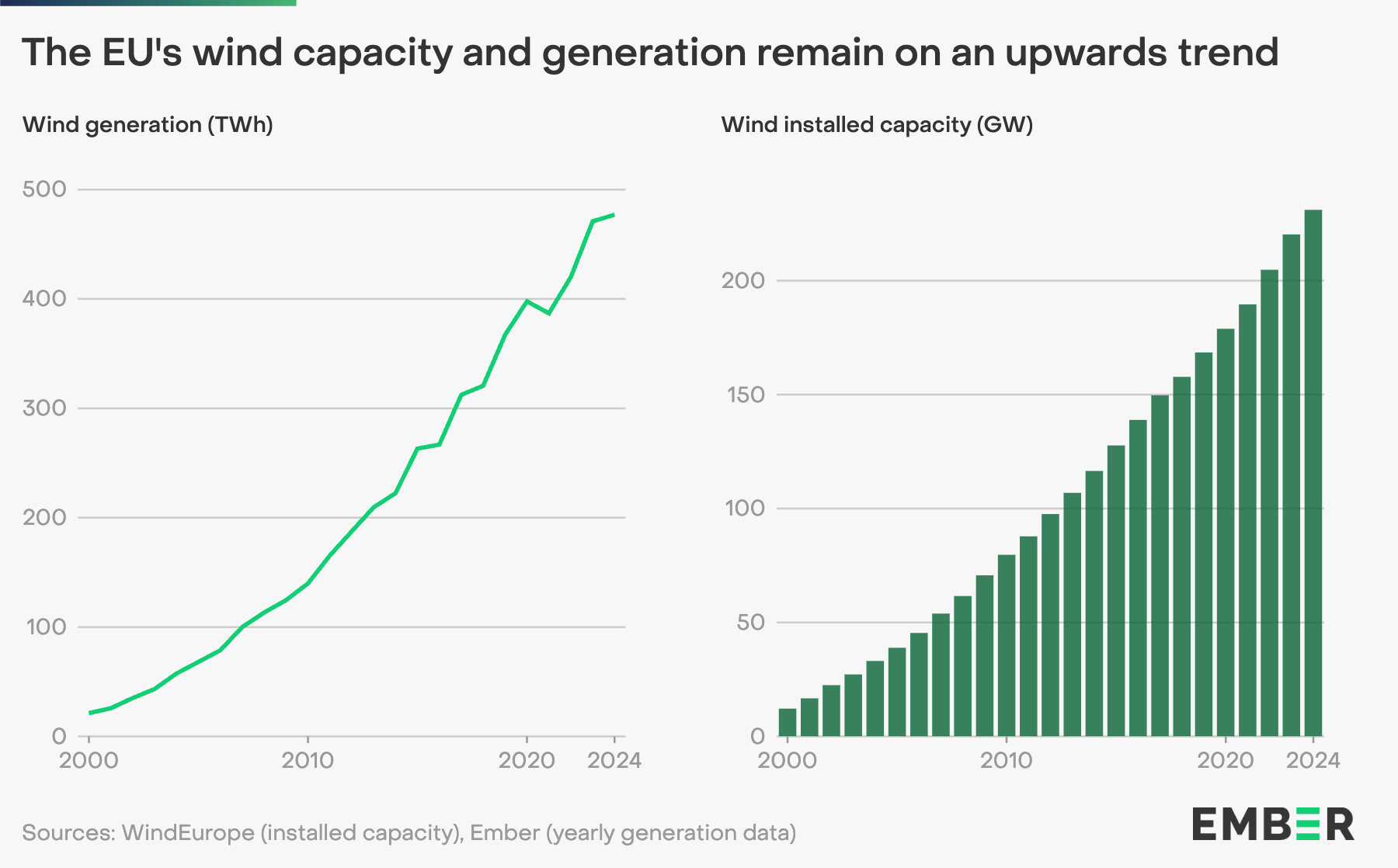
As of 2024, the EU's wind capacity and generation remain on an upwards trend.

Wind energy is a major component of the European power grid, meeting 17% of the total electricity demand across the EU and the UK in 2022. However, the construction of new wind farms often faces localised opposition. While general public acceptance of renewable energy is high - with surveys indicating that 86% of Europeans support new projects in their local areas - this support drops to 62% specifically for wind energy developments, largely driven by aesthetic, environmental and economic concerns.

== EU Wind Power Package ==
The European Commission introduced the European Wind Power Package in October 2023, which incorporates the European Wind Power Action Plan. This plan aims to streamline wind energy deployment by expediting processes such as permitting and auction design, with an emphasis on increasing investment in offshore wind and ocean energies.

Despite EU wind generation capacity reaching 221 GW in 2023, additional efforts are required to align with the EU's energy and climate objectives by 2030. Wind power constitutes over one-third (37%) of total renewable electricity generation in the EU and contributes to the economy, providing approximately 300,000 jobs in 2022. With the implementation of the REPowerEU targets, job growth is projected to reach 936,000 by 2030.

== By country ==
Wind power capacity per capita over time

=== Denmark ===
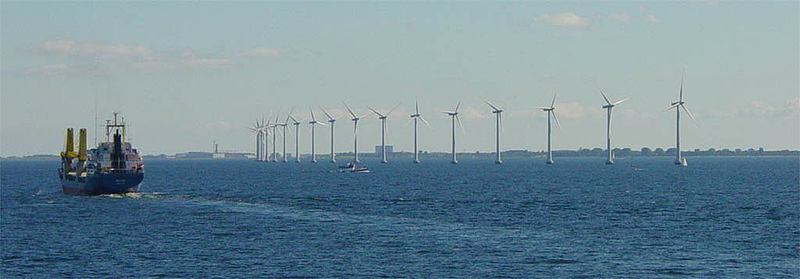
Middelgrunden offshore wind farm, 3.5 km outside Copenhagen

In 2014, wind power in Denmark provided some 39 per cent of Danish domestic electricity and Denmark is a leading wind power nation in the world. The Danes were pioneers in developing commercial wind power during the 1970s and today almost half of the wind turbines around the world are produced by Danish manufacturers such as Vestas and Siemens Wind Power.

The Danish wind turbine industry is the world's largest and 90% of the wind turbines manufactured in Denmark are sold to international markets. In 2003, the Danish manufacturers had a total world market share of approximately 38%, generating a combined turnover of almost 3 billion Euro and maintaining over 20,000 people employed in the industry, from wind turbine factories to maintenance and research.

The development of wind power in Denmark has been characterised by a close collaboration between publicly financed research and industry in key areas such as research and development, certification, testing, and the preparation of standards.

=== Estonia ===
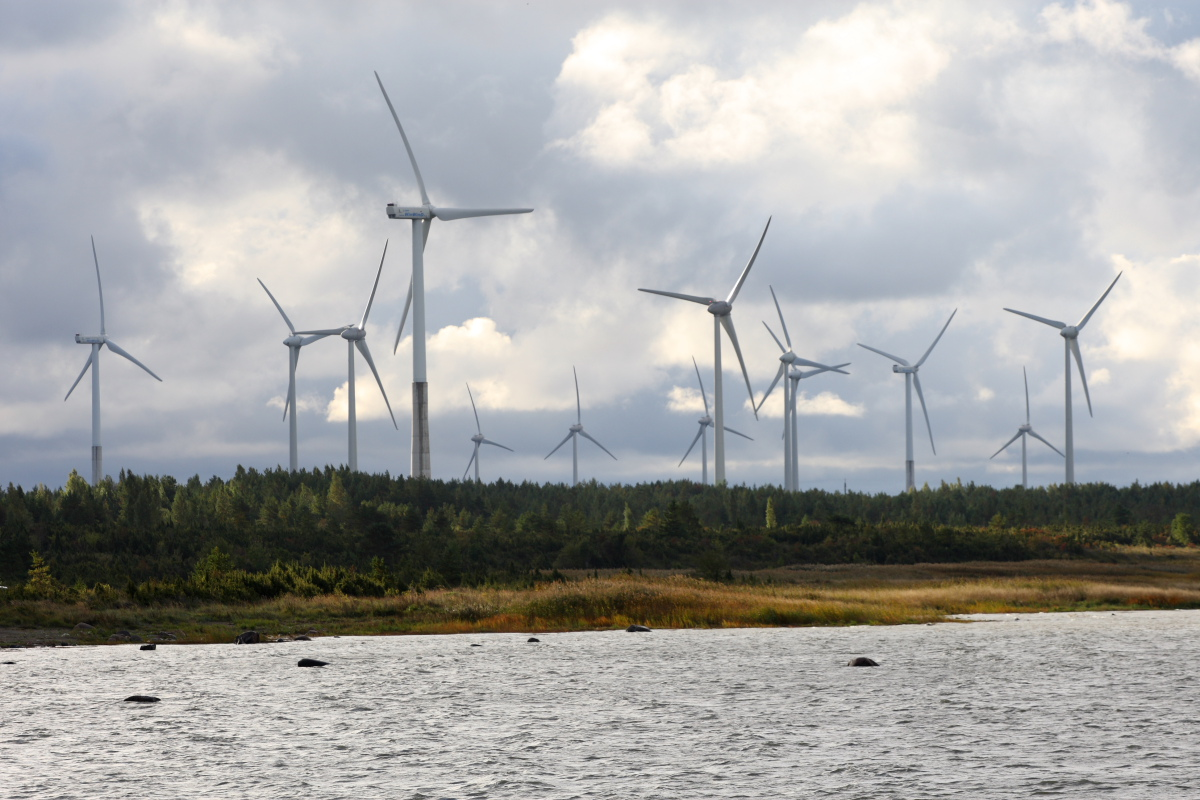
Wind farm of Hanila, Lääne County

As of 2013, the installed capacity of wind power in Estonia was 269.4 MW, while roughly 1466.5 MW worth of projects are currently being developed and three major offshore projects with total capacity of 1490 MW are being planned. Estonia, as a country, which is widely open to the sea and has a flat territory, possesses a very high potential for the development of wind energy.

According to a survey carried out by the Estonian Ministry of the Environment, 95% of the respondents considered wind power as the most environmentally friendly way to produce energy.

=== Finland ===
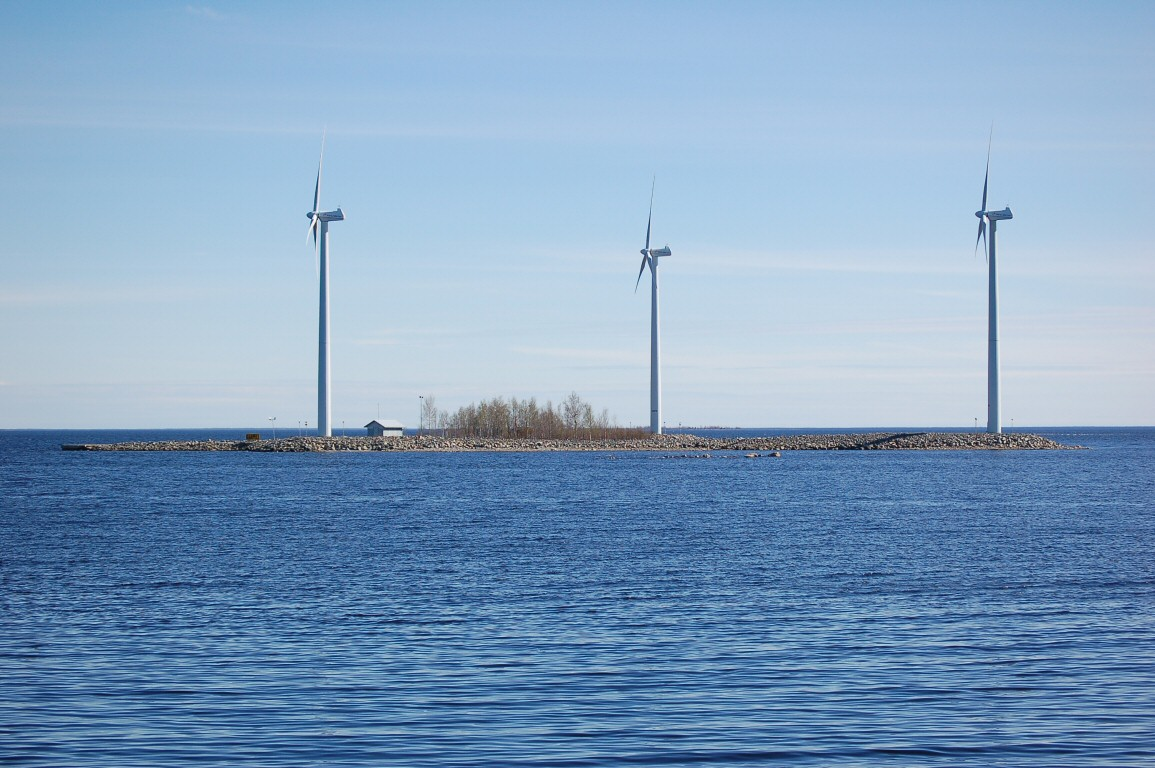
Wind farm in Ii, Finland

Wind power in Finland has been the fastest growing source of electricity in recent years. In 2024, Finland covered 24% of the yearly electricity demand with wind power production, which was 25% of domestic production. Wind capacity was up 20% from the previous year and wind production up 37%. This compares to an average wind power share of 19% in the EU.

By the end of 2022, Finland's wind power capacity reached 5,677 MW with 1,393 turbines installed. That year, wind power production increased by 41% to 11.6 TWh, representing 14.1% of the country's electricity consumption. This growth positioned wind power as the country's third largest electricity source. In 2024 wind surpassed hydropower to become the second largest source behind only nuclear power.

According to a 2018 study done by VTT Technical Research Centre of Finland, published in Nature Energy, new wind power technology could cover the entire electricity consumption (86 TWh) of Finland.

Wind power is one of the most popular energy resources among the Finnish public. In 2022 82% of respondents wanted more wind power, which was second only to solar with 90%. Previous results include 90% in September 2007 and 88% in April 2005. In the Pori area of Finland 97% of people supported wind power according to Suomen Hyötytuuli Oy in 2000.

=== Germany ===
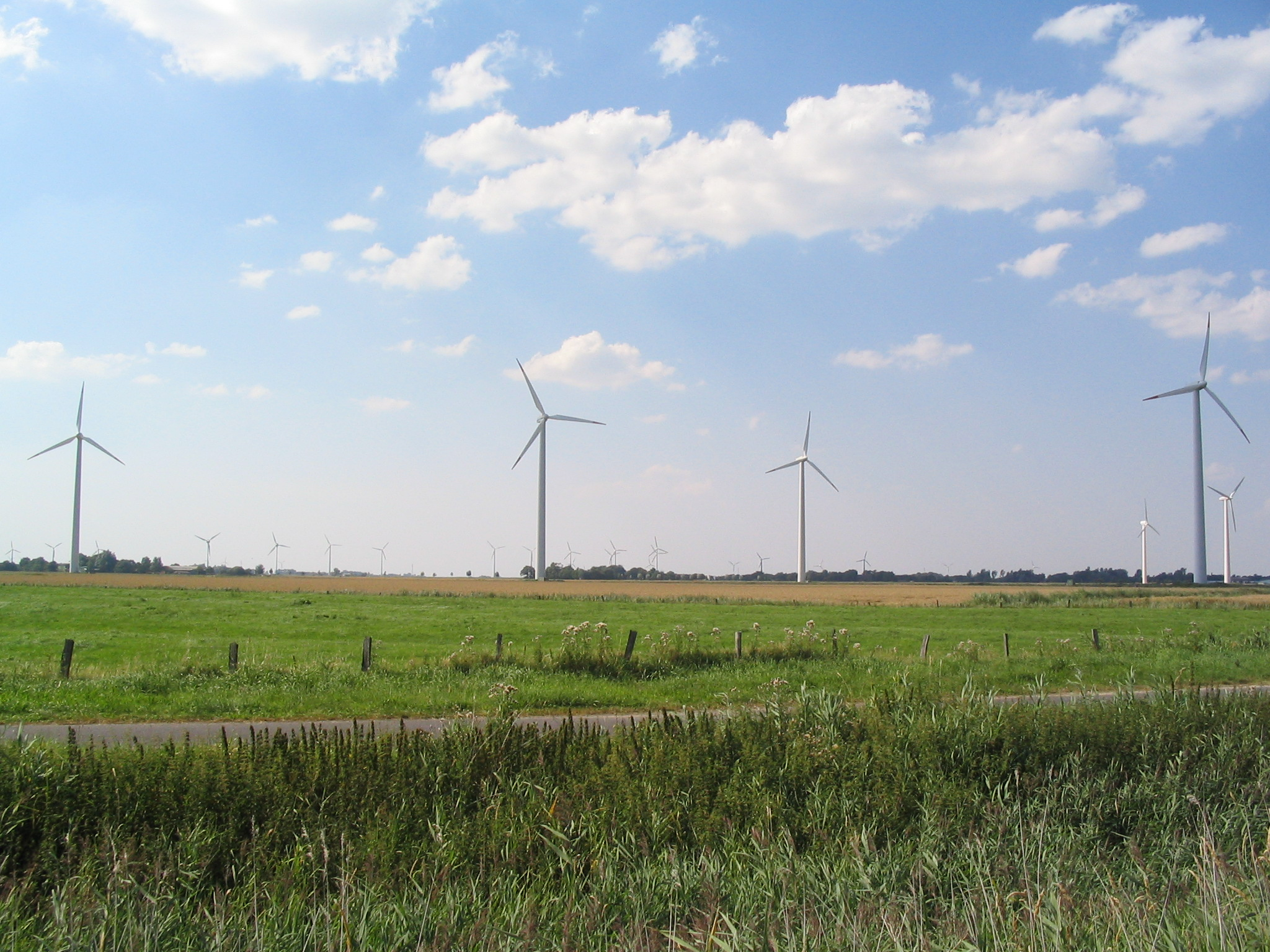
Wind farm in Neuenkirchen

Wind power plays an important role in Germany's renewable energy mix. In October 2014, the installed domestic capacity amounted to 35,678 megawatts, of which offshore contributed 616 MW.

In 2014, wind generated more than 51 terawatt-hours of electricity and contributed about 9.7% to the nations total net-generated electricity. This is 1.3% more than the year before. December 2014 was the best month, generating 8.9 TWh and on par with record-breaking month of December 2011. Along with the generated electricity of 18.5 TWh (3.5%) from hydro, 32.8 TWh (6.2%) from solar, and 54 TWh (10.0%) from biomass, all four renewable energy sources generated 154 TWh or about 30% of the nation's total net-generation. Electricity production from combined wind and solar has now achieved almost the level of nuclear power (84.2 TWh vs. 91.8 TWh).

More than 21,607 wind turbines are located in the German federal area, and the country has plans to build more wind turbines. As of 2011, Germany's federal government is working on a new plan for increasing renewable energy commercialisation, with a particular focus on offshore wind farms.

=== Greece ===
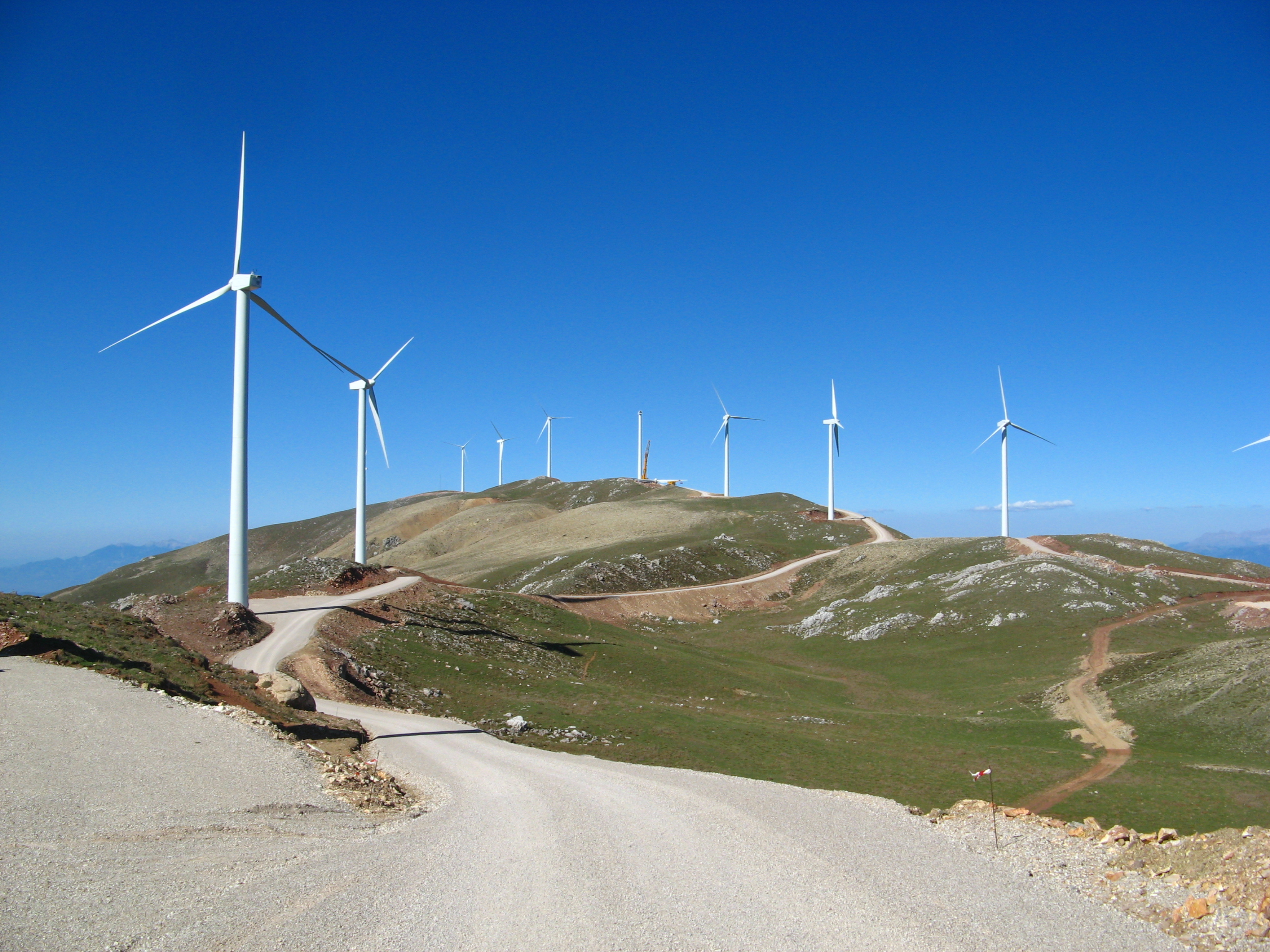
View of a wind farm, Panachaiko mountain

Wind power in Greece was due to expand by 352% by 2010 to meet the European target of 20% coverage of energy needs from renewable sources. Previously, there were 1,028 wind turbines installed throughout Greece and the number was set to reach 2,587 wind turbines before the end of 2010.

According to the Ministry of Environment and Public Works, the system would have a nameplate capacity of 3,372MW of power from wind alone compared to 746MW at the end of 2006. Greece chose to invest primarily to wind power by 77%, while the rest of renewable sources altogether comprise the remaining 23% of production with hydroelectric power being second with 11%.

=== Ireland ===
Ireland is the best location in Europe for wind power, as it is situated on the Western edge of Europe and is exposed to high winds from the Atlantic Ocean and Irish Sea. Wind power capacity factors tend to be higher in Ireland than anywhere else. By the end of 2019 the installed capacity of wind power in Ireland was 4,155 megawatts, generating 36.3% of Ireland's electrical power in 2020.

Most wind farms in Ireland are located in coastal regions and especially in the West of Ireland. However, the Irish Sea is getting some attention and the first offshore wind farm in Ireland is located a few kilometres north of Arklow and 10 km out to sea and is known as the Arklow Bank Wind Park. This is set to expand in the future. Other proposals are an offshore wind farm on the Kish Bank which is about 15 kilometres offshore from Dublin, the capital city. With another planned wind farm at Clogherhead (north of Drogheda, south of Dundalk), to be called the Oriel Wind Farm. The Codling windfarm, planned for the south Irish Sea, will have a capacity of 1100 MW with 330 turbines, giving a huge boost to wind generated power in Ireland.

=== Lithuania ===
Wind energy is set to become Lithuania's main electricity source, projected to account for at least 70% by 2030, according to the International Energy Agency's (IEA) 2021 Energy Policy Review. This reflects Lithuania's strategy to be electricity self-sufficient by 2050, reducing current import needs from 70% to zero. The country encourages decentralized energy production, including wind power, with subsidies, net metering, and virtual power plants. To handle wind energy's variability, Lithuania plans to implement hydrogen storage for offshore wind by 2030. Litgrid, the national grid operator, is focusing on integrating more wind and solar power, essential for supporting energy generation by prosumers and aligning with EU sustainable energy goals.

=== Romania ===
The Fântânele-Cogealac Wind Farm in Romania, it consists of 240 turbines, with a capacity of 600 MW.

As of 2016, wind power in Romania has an installed capacity of about 3,028 MW, up from the 14 MW installed capacity in 2009. The main regions of great potential of wind are Northern Dobruja and Moldavia.

The 600 MW Dunarea East and West wind project, located in southeastern Romania, is expected to begin operations in 2026. Its substantial size is comparable to that of the Fântânele-Cogealac wind power plant, situated nearby and recognized as the largest onshore wind facility in Europe, with a capacity of 600 MW.

=== Spain ===
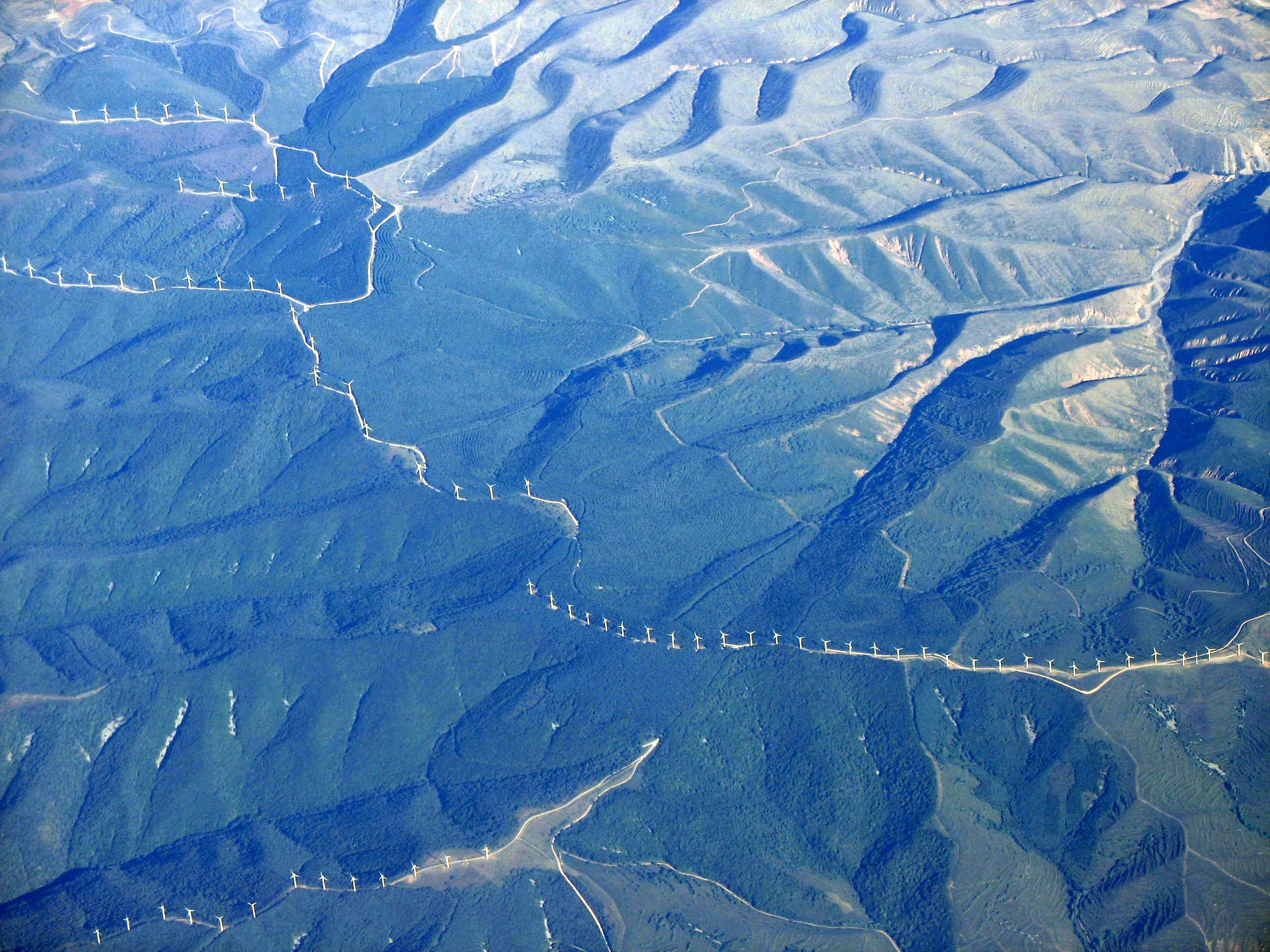
Aerial view of the Sierra de Gredos in Spain

In 2011, Spain was Europe's leading producer of wind energy and ranked second only behind Germany in terms of installed capacity. In 2012, domestic capacity amounted to 22,785 MW. Wind power alone covered 16.6% of the total electricity demand in Spain in 2010 (according to Red Eléctrica de España, the Spanish system operator) and continues as the third technology in the system, after nuclear power and combined cycles. Wind energy's installed capacity could meet the electricity needs of two-thirds of Spanish households. In 2010, the electricity sector reduced its CO_{2} emissions by 26% thanks to wind energy. "Spain holds these positions as a result of the establishment of a stable regulatory framework, better understanding of the resource, and improved technology that have afforded considerable cost reduction in terms of initial investment, maintenance, and exploitation".

=== Turkey ===
Wind power generates about 10% of Turkey's electricity, mainly in the west in the Aegean and Marmara regions, and is gradually becoming a larger share of renewable energy in the country. As of 2023, Turkey has 11 gigawatts (GW) of wind turbines. The Energy Ministry plans to have almost 30 GW by 2035.

=== United Kingdom ===
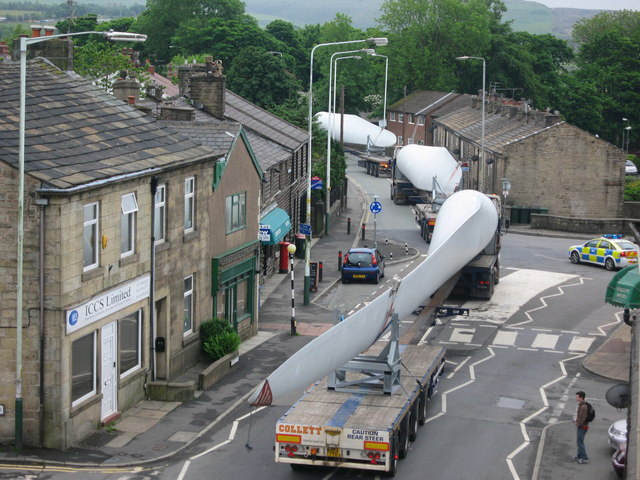
A turbine blade convoy passing through Edenfield, UK

By the beginning of March 2022, the UK had 11,091 wind turbines with a total installed capacity of over 24.6 gigawatts (GW): 14.1 GW of onshore capacity and 10.4 GW of offshore capacity, the sixth largest capacity of any country in 2019.

1.8 GW of new wind power capacity was brought online during 2012, a 30% increase of the total UK installed capacity. 2012 was a significant year for the offshore wind industry with 4 large wind farms becoming operational with over 1.1 GW of generating capability coming on stream.

Through the Renewables Obligation, British electricity suppliers are now required by law to provide a proportion of their sales from renewable sources such as wind power or pay a penalty fee. The supplier then receives a Renewables Obligation Certificate (ROC) for each MW·h of electricity they have purchased. Within the United Kingdom, wind power is the second largest source of renewable energy after biomass.

Wind power is expected to continue growing in the United Kingdom for the foreseeable future – RenewableUK estimated in 2010 that more than 2,000 MW of capacity would be deployed per year for the next five years. By 2020, the United Kingdom is expected to have more than 28,000 MW of wind capacity. By 2050, UK government plans to cut carbon emissions to zero by using wind power.

== Europe's Wind Energy Event ==
In the Europe's Premier Wind Energy Event February 2013 wind was evaluated by Robert Clover from MAKE Consulting as the cheapest electricity technology after 2020 meeting 50% of electricity demand in Europe by 2050. According to Fatih Birol, Chief Economist at the International Energy Agency, without phasing out fossil fuel subsidies, the EU will not reach its climate targets. The fossil fuel subsidies were half a trillion dollars in 2011. The biggest challenges of wind energy is the lack of predictability of government policies, and not the lack of predictability of wind power, according to Birol. Retroactive policy changes have also undermined investment in renewable energy projects. The European wind industry needs skilled workforce. The EU wind energy capacity in the end of 2012 was 105.6 GW. Renewable energy represented 69% of new power capacity in 2012, while fuel oil, coal and nuclear capacity saw negative growth due to decommissioning.

== Public opinion ==
Recent public opinion surveys about wind power at both the EU and the country level shows that wind energy, being a clean and renewable energy source, is traditionally linked to very strong and stable levels of public support. About 80 per cent of EU citizens support wind power. Despite overwhelming popular support in the abstract, wind farm projects at times raise local opposition, especially in locations closer to populations or to woodland wildlife. For instance, a wind project in Ripfjallet, Sweden in 2020 has been opposed by a group of local residents who wish to maintain the historical landscape. They succeeded in arranging a local referendum scheduled for 22 June 2020 to determine the future of the project. In Germany, a government agency found that there were 325 active lawsuits against wind projects as of January 2020, often on the basis of protecting ecology and wildlife.

Opinion on increase in number of wind farms, 2010 Harris Poll
	Great Britain	France	Italy	Spain	Germany
	%	%	%	%	%
Strongly oppose	6	6	2	2	4
Oppose more than favour	12	16	11	9	14
Favour more than oppose	44	44	38	37	42
Strongly favour	38	33	49	53	40

== Statistics ==
=== Installed wind power capacity ===
Europe wind power Capacity (MW)
#	Country	2025	2024	2023	2022	2021	2020	2019	2018	2017	2016	2015	2014	2013	2012	2011	2010	2009	2008	2007	2006	2005	2004	2003	2002	2001	2000	1999	1998
Installed wind power capacity in Europe
1	Germany	77,691	72,672	69,675	66,322	64,040	62,580	60,720	58,850	55,580	49,430	44,580	38,610	33,480	30,830	28,770	27,180	25,777	23,897	22,247	20,622	18,415	16,629	14,609	11,994	8,754	6,113	4,442	2,875
2	Spain	33,158	31,180	30,569	29,798	28,196	27,264	25,808	23,494	23,170	23,026	22,987	22,986	22,959	22,796	21,674	20,676	19,149	16,689	15,131	11,623	10,028	8,264	6,203	4,825	3,337	2,235	1,812	834
3	UK	32,894	31,636	29,622	28,493	26,812	24,167	23,515	20,970	18,872	15,030	14,291	12,440	10,531	8,445	6,540	5,204	4,051	2,974	2,406	1,962	1,332	904	667	552	474	406	362	333
4	France	26,372	24,383	22,792	21,135	19,081	17,949	16,646	15,309	13,759	11,670	10,324	9,285	8,254	7,196	6,800	5,660	4,492	3,404	2,454	1,567	757	390	257	148	93	66	25	19
5	Sweden	18,515	17,200	16,441	14,585	12,097	9,992	8,985	7,407	6,691	6,519	6,029	5,425	4,470	3,745	2,907	2,163	1,560	1,048	788	571	509	442	399	345	293	231	220	174
6	Turkey	15,935	13,793	12,342	11,969	10,750	9,305	8,056	7,369	6,857	6,101	4,718	3,763	2,956	2,312	1,691	1,329	801	458										
7	Italy	13,481	12,945	12,336	11,848	11,108	10,852	10,512	9,958	9,479	9,255	8,973	8,663	8,551	8,144	6,747	5,797	4,850	3,736	2,726	2,123	1,718	1,266	905	788	682	427	277	180
8	Netherlands	11,792	11,706	11,493	9,052	8,165	6,784	4,600	4,471	4,341	4,180	3,391	2,805	2,693	2,391	2,328	2,245	2,229	2,225	1,747	1,558	1,219	1,079	910	693	486	446	433	361
9	Poland	11,200	10,233	9,383	7,864	7,116	6,614	5,917	5,864	6,397	5,782	5,100	3,834	3,390	2,497	1,616	1,107	725	544	276	153	83	63	63	27	0	0	0	0
10	Finland	9,504	8,357	6,943	5,678	3,328	2,586	2,284	2,041	2,113	1,533	1,005	627	448	288	197	197	146	143	110	86	82	82	52	43	39	39	39	17
11	Denmark	7,508	7,612	7,562	7,282	7,178	6,180	6,128	5,758	5,476	5,242	5,075	4,845	4,772	4,162	3,871	3,752	3,465	3,163	3,125	3,136	3,128	3,118	3,116	2,889	2,489	2,417	1,771	1,443
12	Portugal	5,990	5,963	5,834	5,696	5,612	5,486	5,437	5,380	5,316	5,269	5,034	4,914	4,724	4,525	4,083	3,898	3,535	2,862	2,150	1,716	1,022	522	296	195	131	100	61	60
13	Belgium	5,860	5,648	5,492	5,306	5,002	4,719	3,879	3,360	2,843	2,400	2,169	1,959	1,651	1,375	1,078	911	563	415	287	194	167	96	68	35	32	13	6	6
14	Greece	5,694	5,354	5,226	4,682	4,452	4,113	3,576	2,844	2,651	2,374	2,136	1,980	1,865	1,749	1,629	1,208	1,087	985	871	746	573	473	383	297	272	189	112	39
15	Norway	5,183	5,188	5,184	5,149	4,655	3,980	2,444	1,675	1,162	838	822	819	768	703	520	441	431	429	333	314	267	160	101					
16	Ireland	5,119	4,861	4,802	4,637	4,405	4,351	4,155	3,564	3,127	2,765	2,440	2,272	2,037	1,738	1,631	1,428	1,260	1,027	795	746	496	339	190	137	124	118	74	73
17	Austria	4,221	4,028	3,885	3,586	3,300	3,120	3,159	3,045	2,828	2,632	2,404	2,095	1,684	1,378	1,084	1,011	995	995	982	965	819	606	415	140	94	77	34	30
18	Romania	3,480	3,150	3,100	3,029	3,029	3,029	3,029	3,029	3,029	3,028	2,976	2,954	2,599	1,905	982	462	14	11	8	3	2	1	1	0	0	0	0	0
19	Lithuania	2,535	1,750	1,208	740	668	548	548	439	421	421	421	279	279	225	179	163	91	54	54	51	48	6	6	0	0	0	0	0
20	Ukraine	2,271	1,947	1,902	1,673	1,673	1,314	1,170	533	593	526	514	498	371	278	151	87	94	90	89	86	77	0	0	0	0	0	0	0
21	Russia			2,043	2,043	2,043	905	191	139	104	15	15	15	15	15	15	9	9	0	0	0	0	0	0	0	0	0	0	0
22	Croatia	1,264	1,303	1,256	1,100	990	803	652	583	583	466	462	347	339	180	131	89	28	0	0	0	0	0	0	0	0	0	0	0
23	Serbia	807	623	512	374	374	374	374	374	18	10	0	0	0	0	0	0	0	0	0	0	0	0	0	0	0	0	0	0
24	Estonia	711	711	376	320	320	320	320	310	310	310	302	302	280	269	184	149	142	78	59	32	32	6	2	2	0	0	0	0
25	Bulgaria	711	706	706	707	707	691	691	691	691	691	691	691	681	674	612	375	177	120	57	36	10	10	0	0	0	0	0	0
26	Czech Republic	372	371	337	337	337	337	337	317	308	281	281	281	269	260	217	215	192	150	116	54	28	17	9	3	0	0	0	0
27	Hungary	333	329	329	329	329	329	329	329	329	329	329	329	329	329	329	295	201	127	65	61	17	3	3	3	0	0	0	0
28	Bosnia and Herzegovina	244	244	135	135	135	135	87	51																				
29	Luxembourg	227	214	208	166	168	166	136	120	120	100	58	58	58	58	44	44	35	35	35	35	35	35	22	17	15	10	10	9
30	Cyprus	177	158	158	158	158	158	158	158	158	158	158	147	147	147	134	82	0	0	0	0	0	0	0	0	0	0	0	0
31	Kosovo	137	137	137	137	137	32	32	32																				
32	Latvia	137	137	137	137	66	66	66	66	66	70	69	62	62	60	31	30	28	27	27	27	27	27	27	24	0	0	0	0
33	Montenegro	118	118	118	118	118	118	118	118																				
34	Switzerland	109	100	101	87	87	87	75	75	75	75	60	60	60	50	46	42	18	14	12	12	12	0	0	0	0	0	0	0
35	North Macedonia	103	73	73	37	37	37	37	37	37	37	37	37	0	0	0	0	0	0	0	0	0	0	0	0	0	0	0	0
36	Faroe Islands	71	71	68	68					18	18	18	18	7	7	0	0	0	0	0	0	0	0	0	0	0	0	0	0
36	Moldova	71																											
38	Slovakia	4	4	3	3	3	3	3	3	3	3	3	3	3	3	3	3	5	5	5	5	3	0	0	0	0	0	0	0
39	Belarus	3	3	3	3	3	3	3	3	3	3	3	3	3	0	0	0	0	0	0	0	0	0	0	0	0	0	0	0
40	Iceland	3	3	3	3	3	3	3	3	3	3	3	3	1.8	0	0	0	0	0	0	0	0	0	0	0	0	0	0	0
41	Slovenia	3	3	3	3	3	3	3	3	3	3	5	2	0	0	0	0	0	0	0	0	0	0	0	0	0	0	0	0
42	Malta	0	0	0	0	0	0	0	0	0	0	0	0	0	0	0	0	0	0	0	0	0	0	0	0	0	0	0	0
Total installed wind power capacity
-	EU-28/27	246,059	230,979	220,253	204,499	188,892	179,093	192,231	178,826	169,319	153,641	142,042	128,751	117,289	105,696	93,957	84,074	74,767	64,712	56,517	48,069	40,511	34,383	28,599	23,159	17,315	12,887	9,678	6,453
-	Europe Offshore	38,617	36,657	34,237	30,267	28,333	25,013	22,071	18,441																				
-	Europe	304,009	284,914	272,497	254,788	235,712	219,546	204,814	189,229	178,096	161,261	148,240	133,968	121,474	109,238	96,607	86,075	76,152	65,741	57,136	48,563	40,898							

=== Per capita capacity ===
Wind power today, in an average wind year, generates the equivalent of over 20% of Denmark's electricity use and 25–30% of that in three German Länder, and on windy days with light loads, over 100% of the load in certain regions, particularly in West Denmark, North Germany, and northern Spain.

EU wind power Capacity in watts per capita
#	Country	2017	2016	2015	2014	2013	2012	2011	2010	2009	2008	2007
1	Denmark	947.2	911.8	894.6	850.1	837.3	745.8	706.2	686.6	627.5	581	579
2	Germany	679.8	608.7	553.7	483.0	415.9	382.8	355.7	332.7	315.3	291	270
3	Sweden	661.6	647.7	618.1	551.0	454.0	394.8	308.7	231.6	166.9	111	88
4	Ireland	652.5	580.7	537.4	490.1	439.5	375.0	364.0	319.6	283.1	228	193
5	Portugal	515.6	511.1	489.6	471.3	471.2	429.2	403.4	366.4	332.5	270	203
6	Spain	497.8	495.6	495.8	495.0	494.3	490.8	469.2	449.6	415.5	370	367
7	Finland	383.1	278.6	182.8	114.3	81.7	53.4	36.6	36.8	27.3	27	21
-	Average	330.8	300.2	278.6	253.3	230.8	209.7	187.2	168.3	149.2	131	116
8	Austria	320.5	299.3	281.0	243.0	195.3	163.2	128.2	120.7	118.8	119	120
9	United Kingdom	287.5	228.9	210.0	192.2	162.7	132.4	105.0	83.9	65.3	54	40
10	Netherlands	252.6	245.3	203.0	165.3	158.7	145.3	139.1	135.4	134.0	136	107
11	Belgium	249.4	212.3	198.0	175.1	147.5	124.5	98.4	81.9	52.0	36	28
12	Greece	246.4	212.3	199.0	180.1	170.2	154.9	143.6	106.9	96.1	88	78
13	Estonia	235.1	229.2	230.7	230.2	213.4	200.8	137.2	111.0	111.3	58	45
14	France	204.8	174.2	156.1	139.3	123.9	114.6	104.0	87.5	69.9	53	40
15	Luxembourg	203.2	173.5	106.7	106.7	106.7	106.7	84.6	86.2	86.2	90	71
16	Cyprus	184.8	185.7	186.5	170.5	170.5	170.5	166.6	102.1	0	0	0
17	Lithuania	175.6	180.4	145.1	96.6	96.6	74.8	55.2	46.3	27.3	19	15
18	Poland	166.5	149.7	134.2	99.6	88.1	64.9	42.3	31.0	18.5	12	7
19	Italy	156.7	152.7	147.3	142.5	140.7	133.9	111.1	96.1	80.3	63	47
20	Romania	154.3	154.2	157.5	151.4	133.2	90.9	45.9	19.5	1	1	0
21	Bulgaria	97.3	93.8	93.8	93.8	92.5	89.7	81.6	49.6	23.4	21	10
22	Latvia	34.2	33.5	33.5	33.5	33.5	33.3	13.9	13.8	12.5	12	12
23	Hungary	33.6	33.0	33.0	33.0	33.0	33.0	32.9	29.3	20.1	12	6
24	Czech Republic	29.1	26.8	26.8	26.8	25.6	24.6	20.6	20.5	18.4	14	11

=== Leading EU countries by wind power production ===
Leading EU countries by wind power production
Country	2019(GWh)	2022 (GWh)
Germany	126,000	124,800
United Kingdom	63,468	
Spain	54,212	62,800
France (w/o overseas)	34,100	38,000
Sweden	19,902	33,300
Netherlands	11,458	21,400
Italy	20,200	20,500
Poland	15,000	19,800
Denmark	16,149	19,000
Portugal	13,732	13,200
Belgium	8,119	12,400
Finland	5,987	12,000
Ireland	9,354	11.200
Greece	7,279	10,900
Austria	7,269	7,200
Romania	6,745	7,000

== See also ==
- Installed wind power capacity
- WindEurope
- Global Wind Energy Council
- Renewable energy in the European Union
- Renewable-energy economy
- Wind power by country
- European countries by fossil fuel use (% of total energy)
