= Renewable energy in Belarus =

Use of renewable energy sources in Belarus

As of 2021, there is little renewable energy in Belarus. 7% of primary energy in Belarus was from renewables in 2019, mostly biofuels. As there is a lot of district heating, more renewables could be integrated into the heat distribution system, but this is hindered by fossil fuel subsidies.

== Policy ==
A 2021 study by the International Renewable Energy Agency (IRENA) recommended:

1. Revising renewable energy targets
2. Improving the quota allocation for renewables
3. Designing renewable energy auctions
4. Harnessing renewable energy potentials in heating
5. Developing an energy sector master plan with higher shares of renewables
6. Adopting a grid code for renewables
7. Improving variable renewable power generation forecasting
8. Improving de-risking mechanisms for renewable energy investments
9. Standardising power purchase agreements
10. Building human and institutional capacities for renewable energy development

== Producers ==
About half of the energy is produced by independent power producers.

== Economics ==
In 2019, energy imports cost 5.5% of the national GDP, which could be reduced by increasing renewable energy production. According to IRENA, increasing renewable energy production would also create jobs and increase energy security.

== Sources of energy ==
=== Biomass ===
There is large potential from wood waste, crop residue, and biogas from manure; About 10% of district heating is biomass.

=== Solar power ===
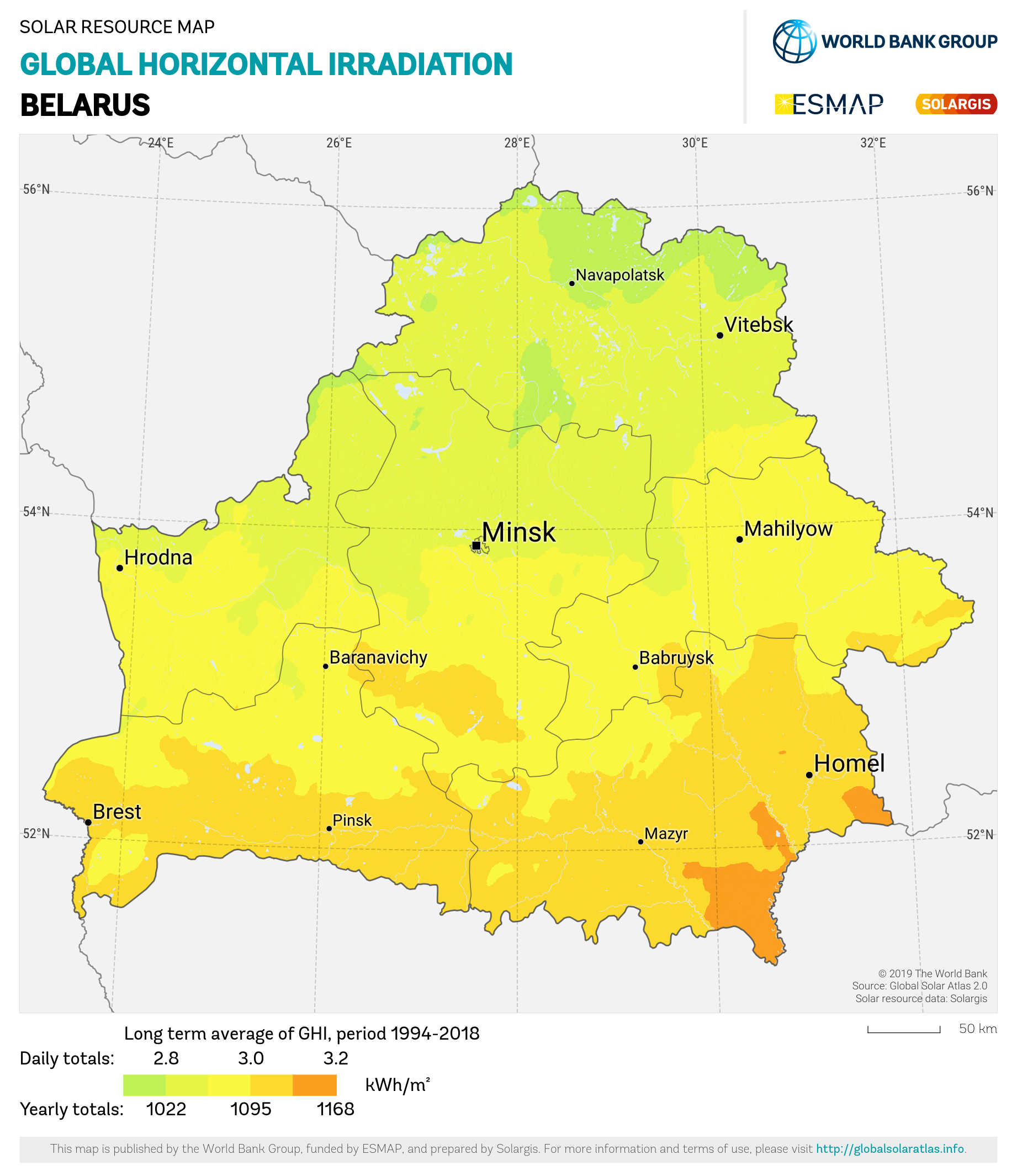
Solar potential of Belarus

As of 2021 there is little use of solar power in Belarus but much potential as part of the expansion of renewable energy in Belarus, as the country has few fossil fuel resources and imports much of its energy. At the end of 2019 there was just over 150MW produced by solar power.

=== Wind power ===
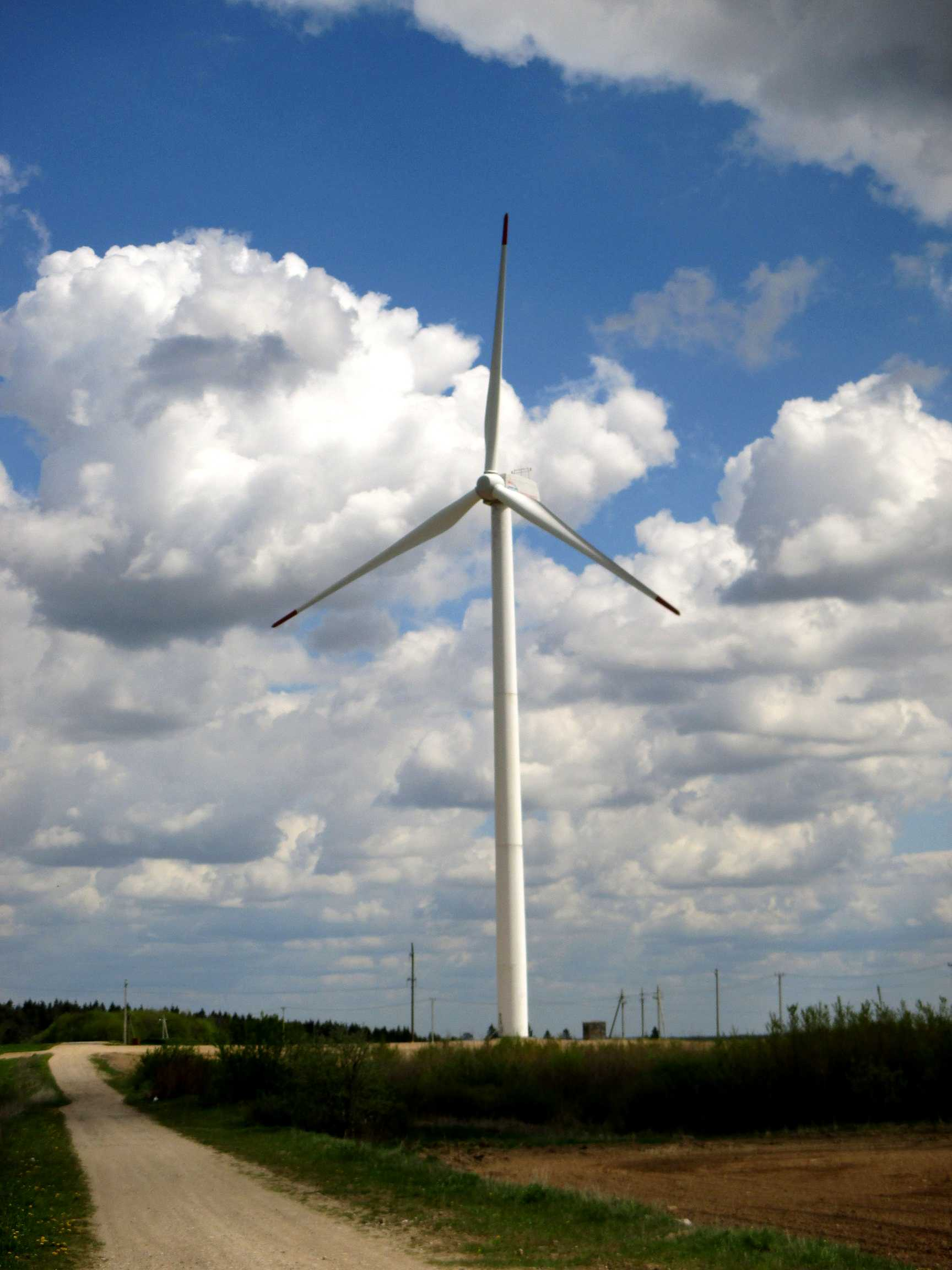
Wind generator near Hrabnyky

Wind power in Belarus is a form of renewable energy, which with solar power, is one of the most important sector of renewable energy in Belarus, but remains underutilized as of 2021. As of 2019, there is one 106 MW wind farm. New wind power is hindered by government quotas and the lack of auctions.

=== Geothermal ===
Although the crust below Belarus is not hot enough for electricity generation it may be possible to integrate geothermal energy into district heating.

=== Hydroelectricity ===
Although small hydroelectric power plants were common before the national grid, there is now less than 100MW produced, since Belarus is mostly flat.
