= Wind power in Austria =

Although Austria is surrounded by land and is really hilly topography, meteorological preconditions permit the utilization of wind power. First calculations on the basis of wind measuring data assessed at the meteorological stations in the early 1980s rendered the surprising result of annually approx. 6,600 to 10,000 gigawatt-hour (GWh) of technically exploitable wind energy potential in Austria.

Austria ranked as the world's seventeenth largest producer of wind power with an installed nameplate capacity of 995 megawatt (MW) in 2008, behind Ireland and ahead of Greece.

== History ==
Back in the 1980s, there were huge private wind measurements and experiments with smaller plants. In 1994, initiated by Councilor Waltner, 110 kilowatt (kW) wind turbine was set up in St. Pölten. Another wind turbine was put into operation six months later in Zistersdorf. In 1995, the first wind turbine was built with civic participation in Michelbach.

In January 1996, the first turbine of the type E-40 with 500 kW was placed in Eberschwang. Not only the absolute largest wind turbines were placed there, but with two plants the first „wind farm“ was established. In the course of 1996, no signs of new funding arrangements had emerged. It led by the end of the year in a panic reaction from the first „boom“ for wind power.

36 wind turbines with 12 MW and an annual total of 18 million kW of work hours had been set up between New Year's Day and New Year's Eve. After 1996, there were, only in exceptional cases, economic conditions for individual projects, including the wind park in Zurndorf with six plants.

The pressure of individual countries and the idea that desired objectives could be reached nationwide cheaper than by any nation-state alone resulted into negotiations between federal and state governments to a new nationwide Green Electricity Act 2002 (Ökostromgesetz 2002) in spring 2002.

Wind turbines with a capacity of a total of 276 MW were built in 2003. The plant output tripled from 139 MW (end 2002) to 415 MW (end 2003) within a year.

== Economics ==
=== Life span of wind turbines ===
According to manufacturers, the life span of wind turbines amounts to 25 years. Important influences on the life span are site specific (wind speed, storms, icing conditions) and the quality of the maintenance of the turbines.

=== External costs ===
External costs are not a part of the investment and operation costs, and are paid by the tax payer and therefore by the public. Examples of external costs for fossil fuel and nuclear electricity production are political and military securing of the access to these energy sources, costs of green house gas emissions, cleaning up of spilled oil, police operations during the transporting of nuclear wastes and other similar activities. Negative external costs arise from wind turbines' impact on landscape aesthetics, animal habitats, increased mortality of bats and birds, noise, and flickering. However, wind power also has positive external effects on power system operation and through the mitigation of air pollution. The externalities of wind power in Austria are currently not quantified.

=== Property for wind turbines ===
Most of the property owners are farmers. They have an additional source of income by leasing their land to the wind park operator. The prices paid for property leases for wind turbines are many times more than would normally be earned by farming the property.

A wind turbine needs an area of up to 500 square metres (5,382 square feet) and the rest of the property can still be farmed without any problem. A wind turbine can also be easily and quickly dismantled.

=== Costs of electricity production ===
According to the costs for infrastructure, a kW of installed capacity costs between €880 and €1,487 (Windpark Handalm). (At the Tauernwindpark a kW costs €1,240 ).

== Installed capacity ==
The table shows an annual increase in installed wind power capacity from 2000 to date.

Year	Nameplate capacity (MW)	Note
2000	77	
2001	94	
2002	139	
2003	415	
2004	606	
2005	819	
2006	965	
2007	982	
2008	995	
2009	995	

Year	Nameplate capacity (MW)
2010	1,011
2011	1,084
2012	1,378
2013	1,684
2014	2,110
2015	2,489
2016	2,730
2017	2,849 (www.igwindkraft.at)
2018	3,027 (www.igwindkraft.at)
2019	3,146 (www.igwindkraft.at)

Year	Nameplate capacity (MW)	Turbines	Note
2020	3,105		
2021	3,297		
2022	3,573	1,371	
2023	3,885	1,426	
2024	4,028	1,451	
2025	4,221	1,447	

== Advantages ==
Production of wind power does not release any pollutants. A wind park with 6 MW installed capacity will reduce approximately the following emissions yearly:

Carbon dioxide	13,600,000 kg
Sulphur dioxide	20,720 kg
Nitrogen oxide	10,220 kg
Carbon monoxide	8,550 kg
Dust	560 kg
Nuclear wastes	72 kg

== Gallery ==
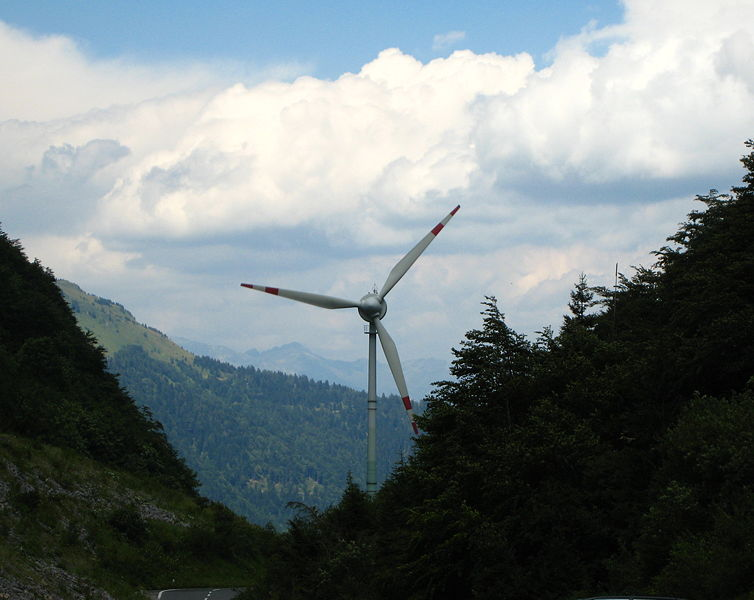
Wind turbine on the Austrian side of the Plöcken Pass

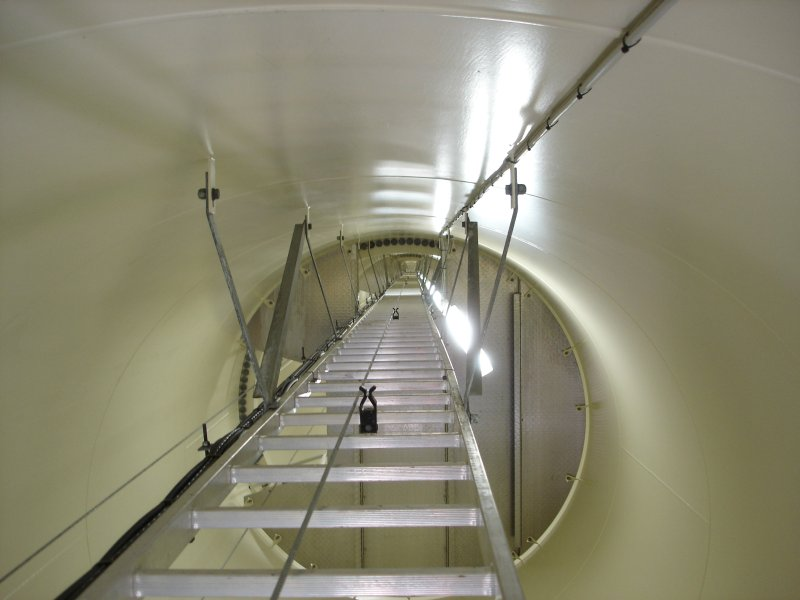
Ladder providing access to the nacelle of a wind turbine in Lower Austria. Photo taken following an inspection. The view is from bottom to top, showing the safety rope for the climb

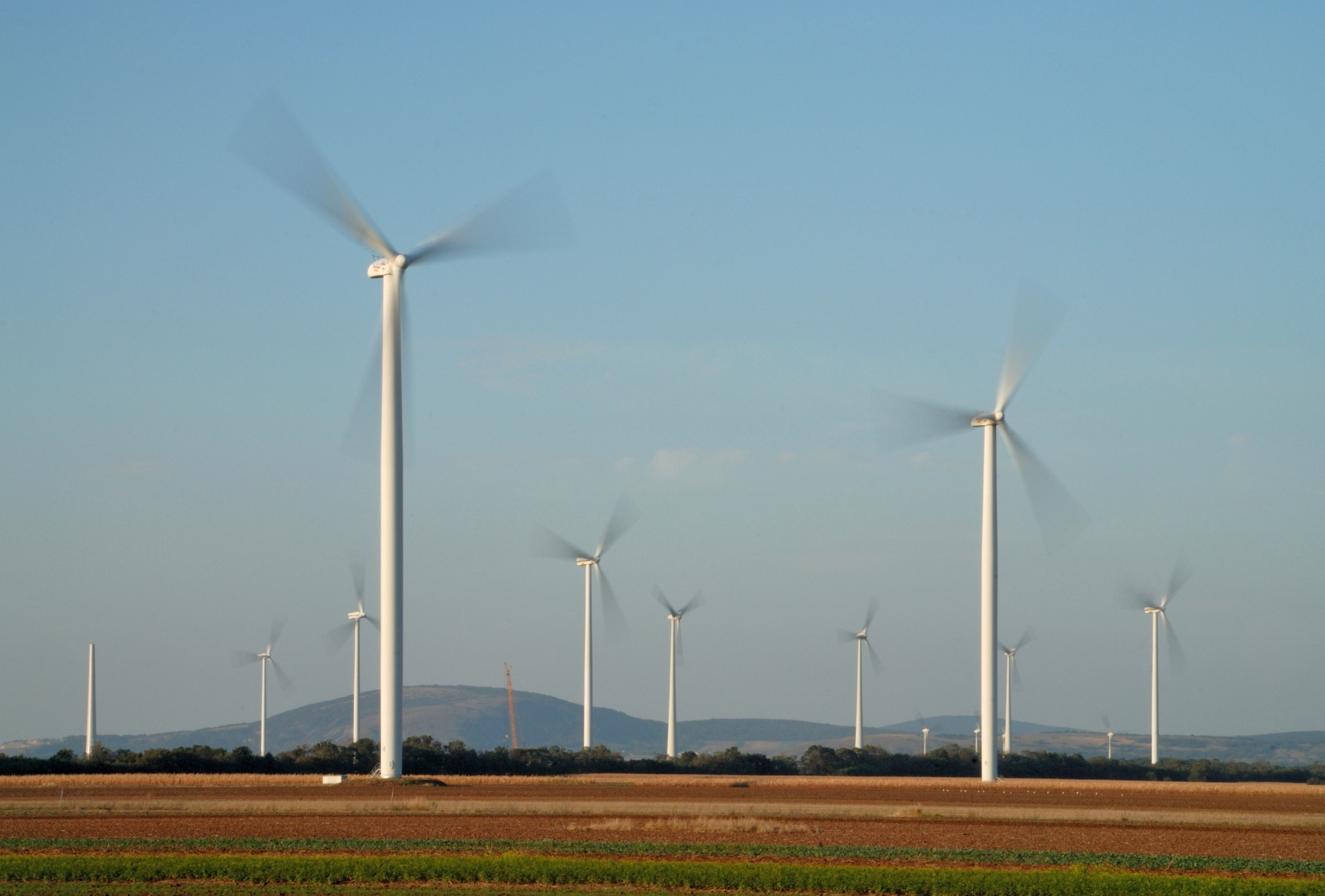
Wind farm Höflein, Lower Austria

Austria compared to other EU countries by wind power installed capacity

== See also ==
- Energy in Austria
- European Wind Energy Association
- Global Wind Energy Council
- Wind power in the European Union
- Solar power in Austria
- Renewable energy by country
