= Wind power in Bulgaria =

Wind power generated 2% of electricity in Bulgaria in 2023. By the end of 2020 almost 1 GW of onshore wind power had been installed. It has been estimated that there is potential for at least another 2 GW by 2030. The total wind power grid-connected capacity in Bulgaria was 702 MW as of 2023.

An energy island in the Black Sea has been suggested for joint development with wind power in Romania.

== Installed capacity growth ==
The table shows an annual increase in installed wind power capacity.

Year	Installed capacity (MW)	Generation (GW·h)
2008	120	122
2009	177	361
2010	375	600
2011	612	968
2012	670	1,212
2013	677	1,240
2014	687	1,304
2015	701	1,468
2016	701	1,426
2017	701	1,515
2018	700	1,345
2019	701	1,490
2020	701	1,478
2021	701	1,434

== List of wind farms in Bulgaria ==
This is a list of wind farms in Bulgaria as of the end of 2015.

Aytos	1,100 kW	3 turbines
Aytos E	400 kW	1 turbine
Aytos N	875 kW	4 turbines
Aytos SW	700 kW	2 turbines
Balchik NE	1,000 kW	4 turbines
Balchik	10,000 kW	5 turbines
Dabovo		
Dobrich Sth	1,050 kW	3 turbines
Dryankovetz		
Elhovo Sth	975 kW	4 turbines
Gulyantsi NE	1,355 kW	3 turbines
Gurkovo	2,000 kW	1 turbine
Hrabrovo	14,000 kW	
Hrabrovo 2	3,000 kW	1 turbine
Kaliakra Wind	35,000 kW	35 turbines
Kardam	12,600 kW	6 turbines
Kavarna	134,000 kW	15 turbines
Kavarna E	4,950 kW	7 turbines
Kavarna N	5,000 kW	6 turbines
Kavarna NE	8,500 kW	13 turbines
Kavarna NW	156,000 kW	52 turbines
Kavarna W	14,100 kW	17 turbines
Krapelit	12,000 kW	6 turbines
Krupen	12,000 kW	4 turbines
Milkovitza		
Mogilishte	3,000 kW	3 turbines
Mogilishte-Zapad	17,600 kW	10 turbines
Neykovo	4,000 kW	2 turbines
Omurtag	750 kW	1 turbine
Ruen		
Shabla N	1,600 kW	2 turbines
Shabla NW	1,990 kW	2 turbines
Shabla S	2,400 kW	3 turbines
Shabla SE	400 kW	1 turbine
Shabla SW	6,100 kW	11 turbines
Shabla W	1,200 kW	3 turbines
Sliven	5,000 kW	6 turbines
Sliven E	1,400 kW	3 turbines
Sliven N	6,850 kW	8 turbines
Somovit	2,500 kW	1 turbine
Straldza Sth	750 kW	3 turbines
Sungurlare		
Suvorovo	60,000 kW	30 turbines
Targoviste	500 kW	1 turbine
Vetrocom	72,500 kW	29 turbines
Vranino	18,000 kW	9 turbines
Yambol	400 kW	1 turbine

== See also ==
- Solar power in Bulgaria
- Hydroelectricity in Bulgaria
- European Wind Energy Association
- Global Wind Energy Council
- Wind power in the European Union
- Renewable energy by country
- Wind power in Serbia
