= Pobeda Solar Park =

Photovoltaic power stations in Pleven, Bulgaria

- Country: Bulgaria
- Location: Pleven Province
- Coordinates: 43°31′16″N 24°32′30″E
- Status: Operational
- Commission date: 2012
- Owner: Hareon Solar
- Operator: ABB

Solar farm
- Type: Flat-panel PV

Power generation
- Nameplate capacity: 50.6 MW

Pobeda Solar Park is a 50.6 MW photovoltaic (PV) plant in Pobeda, in the Pleven Province of Northern Bulgaria.

The power plant is monitored from a control center in Sofia, along with three other photovoltaic power plants totaling 85 MW, expected to produce a combined total of 95 GWh/year.

This projects was funded through the E.U and is one more step that Bulgaria is making to modernize and join their fellow E.U. countries with efforts to expand clean energy.

On July 2, 2012 the control module and transformer were damaged by a rocket-propelled grenade, shortly before the power plant was connected to the grid.

== See also ==
- List of photovoltaic power stations
- Solar power in Bulgaria
