= Solar power in Bulgaria =

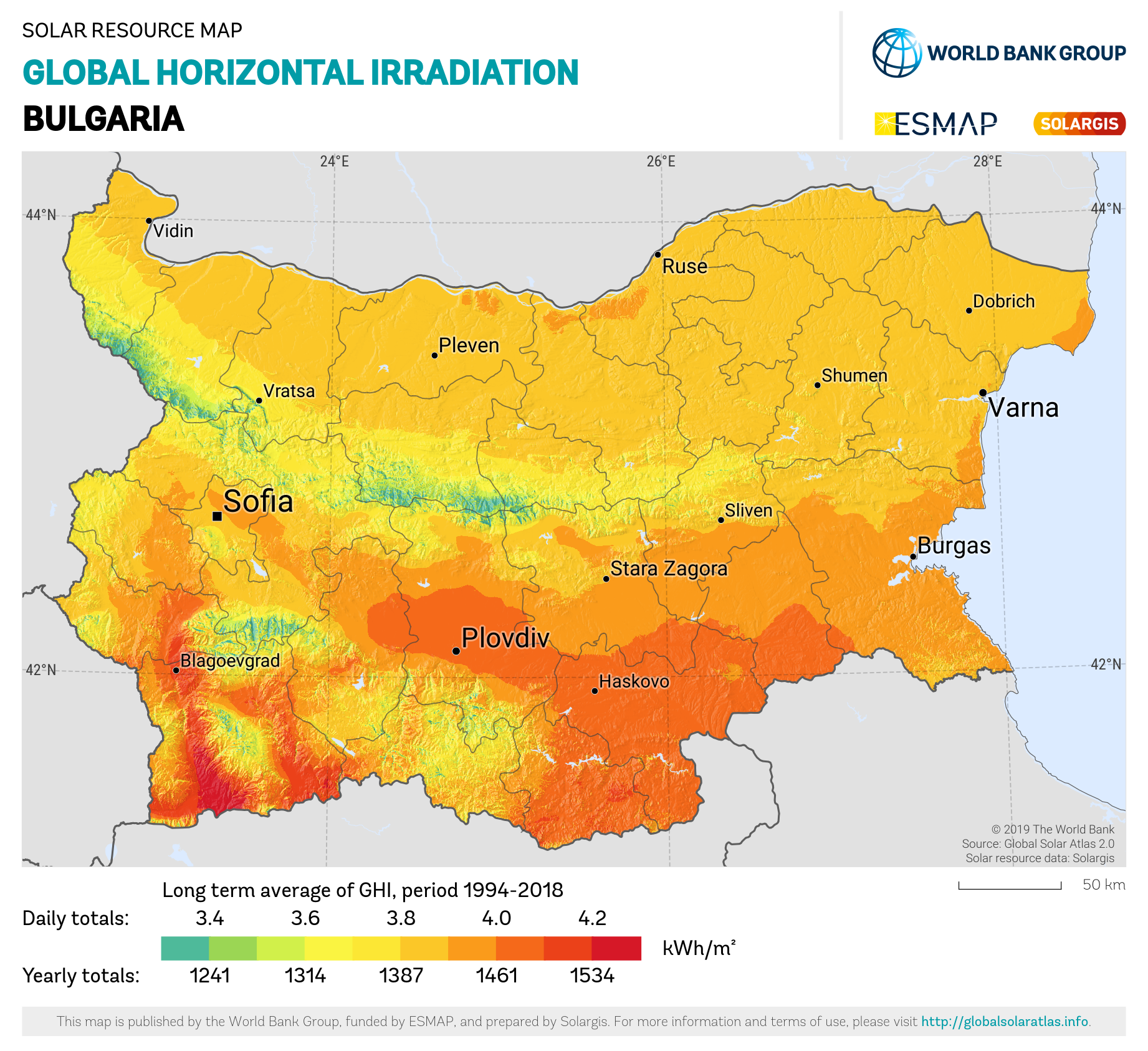
- Solar irradiation map of Bulgaria
- Installed capacity: 3.9 GW (2024) (33)
- Annual generation: 5.3 TWh (2024)
- Capacity per capita: 576 W (2024)
- Share of electricity: 14% (2024)

Solar power generated 12% of Bulgaria's electricity in 2023.

By the end of 2020 about 1 GW of solar PV had been installed. It has been estimated that there is potential for at least another 4 GW by 2030.

By the end of 2024 about 3.9 GW of solar had been installed.

Bulgaria has a high potential for solar irradiation, especially in the southern regions of the nation. Solar plants are rapidly increasing — from a total of 100 MW of solar power installed capacity in 2011, as of 2023, Bulgaria has more than 2,400 MW, of them 600 MW were added in 2022. The capacity is set to reach 3,000 MW. The largest solar parks are Dalgo Pole (207 MW) in Plovdiv Province and Verila (123 MW) in Kyustendil Province. There is a trend of many companies installing solar panels of own to reduce buying electricity from the grid, with a similar trend on the rise for domestic use as well. For the first time in Bulgaria, albeit for a few hours in May 2023, photovoltaics produced more electricity than nuclear power plants and thermal power plants, providing 31% of the electricity production.

== History ==
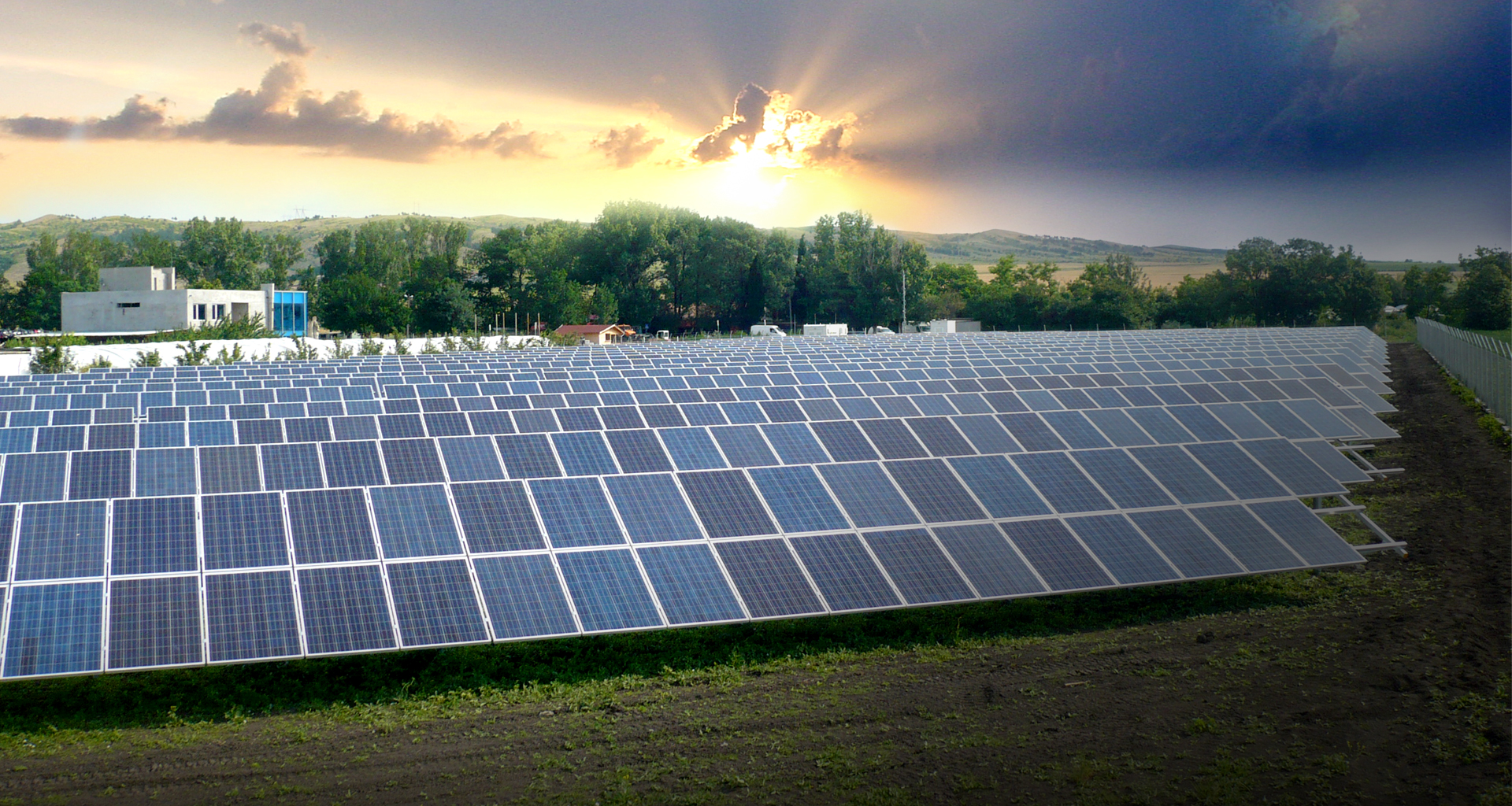
Solar installation, Aytos

Solar power in Bulgaria was expanded by 100 megawatts (MW) in 2011. A 16.2 MW solar power plant in Zdravetz, Bulgaria was expected to be completed in June 2012, with power being sold for $0.30/kWh in a fixed rate 20 year power purchase agreement.

Since then, however, new installations have nearly come to a halt, with only about 12 MW of additional capacity installed during 2013 and 2014.

Year	Photovoltaics	
Year	MWp	GWh
2008	1.4	
2009	5.7	3.3
2010	35	15
2011	141	120
2012	1,010	n.a.
2013	1,020	1,349
2014	1,022	1,245
2015	1,041	1,391
2016	1,030	1,392
2017	1,031	1,408
2018	1,033	1,381
2019	1,044	1,252
2020	1,100	1,478
2021	1,275	1,488
2022	1,737	
2023	2,927	
2024	4,560	
2025	5,910	
Source: IEA-PVPS/EPIA for capacity, Photovoltaic Barometerfor generation, previous

On March 13, 2023, peak photovoltaics power was 30% of Bulgaria electricity generation. However, long-term share of solar power is much lower. Director of Bulgarian transmission network estimated photovoltaics growth as 30% in 2022, and he expected 700 MW new solar capacity in 2023, which could represent 30-40% YoY growth.

In April 2023 Bulgaria's Inercom signed a contract with Huasun for a supply of 1.5GW solar modules.

== Current and upcoming projects ==
PV power station	Location	Capacity in MWp	Commissioning	Notes/ref
Karadzhalovo Solar Park	Karadzhalovo	60	2012	
Pobeda Solar Park	Pleven Province	51	2012	
Verila Solar 1	Dupnitsa Municipality	124	2023	
Bobov Dol Solar Park	Golemo Selo	100	2024	
Kyustendil	Kyustendil	More than 100	Concept stage	
Ogosta floating solar park	Ogosta Reservoir	500 to 800	Concept stage	
Verila Solar 2	Dupnitsa Municipality	50	2023	
Chirpan solar power plant	Chirpan	160	2024	
Dalgo Pole PV park (Phase 1,2,3)	Kaloyanovo Municipality	208	2023	
Knizhovnik Solar PV Park	Haskovo Province	400	Concept stage	
Tenevo solar power plant	Yambol Province	238	2025	
Apriltsi Photovoltaic Park	Pazardzhik Province	300	2023	
Galabovo Solar PV Park	Galabovo	150	2023	
Terasol Solar Park	Stara Zagora Province	116	2023	
Ravnets PV Solar + Hydrogen Park	Ravnets Air Base	120	Concept stage	
"Golf" PV Park	Sliven Municipality	40	2023	
Winslow PV Park	Malko Tarnovo	36	2023	
Gabare PV Park	Byala Slatina Municipality	450	Concept stage	
Aratiden PV Park	Kyustendil	100	2024	
Saint George solar park	Silistra Province	229	2024	
Hadjidimitrovo-Kronos	Kazanlak	80	2024	
Belozem Solar Park 2	Stara Zagora Province	100	2024	
Tsenovo Solar	Tsenovo, Ruse Province	80	2025	

== See also ==
- Solar power
- Solar power by country
- Solar power in the European Union
- Growth of photovoltaics
- Wind power in Bulgaria
- Hydroelectricity in Bulgaria
- Renewable energy by country
