= Wind power in Estonia =

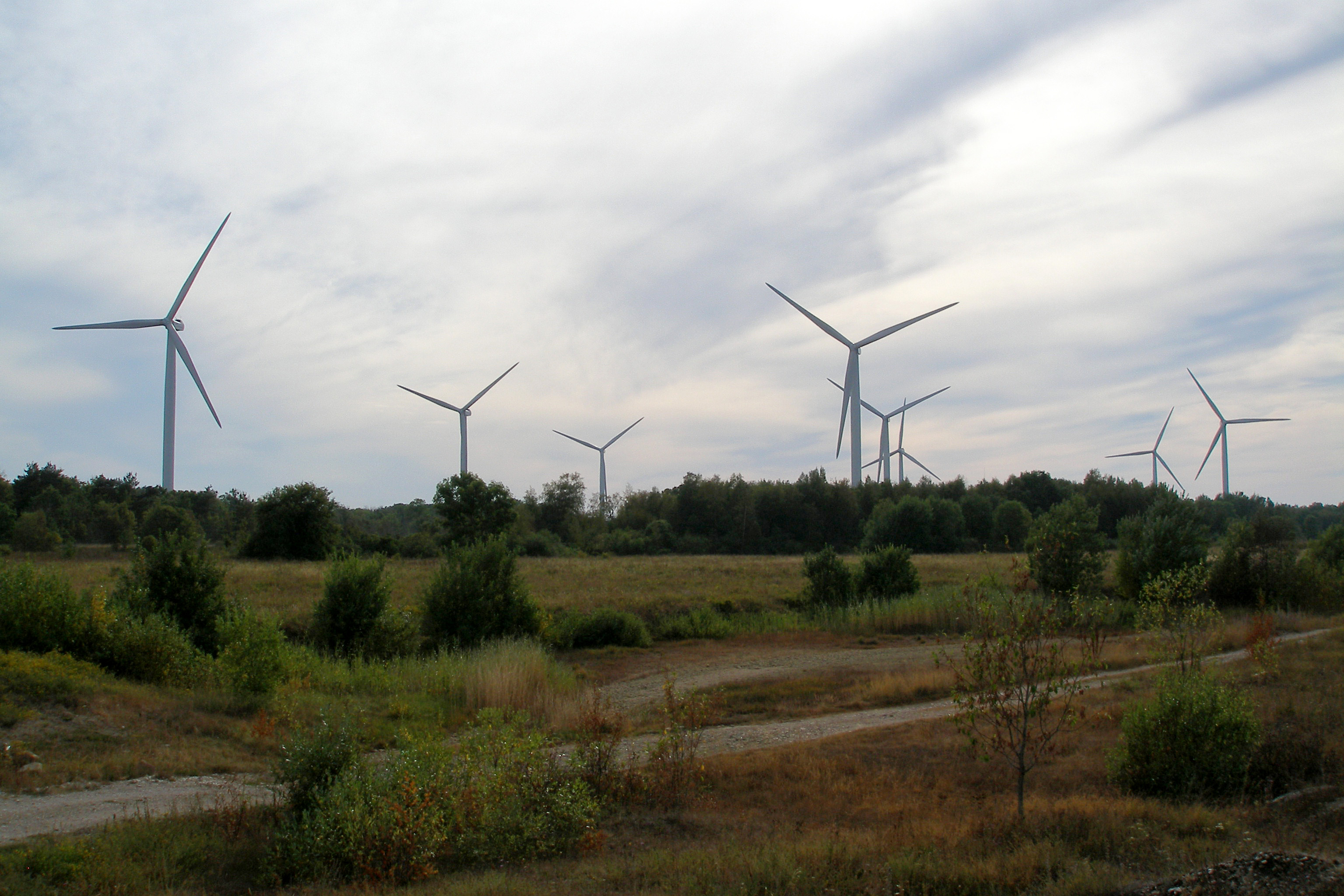
Pakri wind farm near Paldiski generating 18.4 MW.

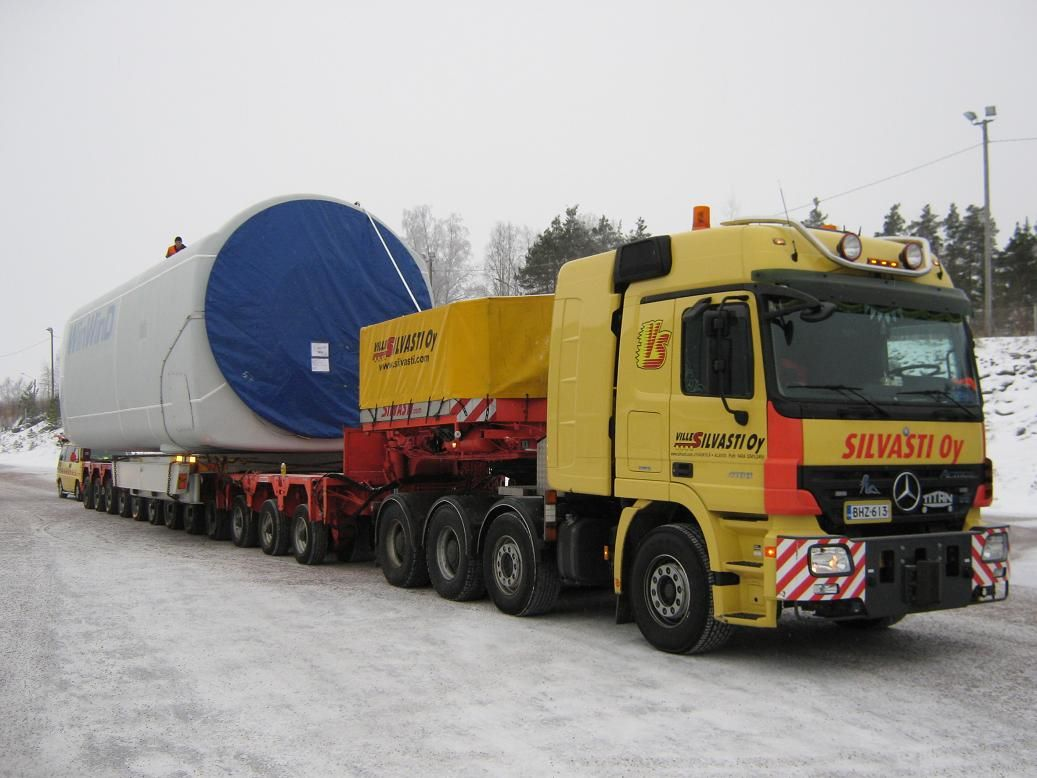
Transportation of a wind turbine to Aulepa, Estonia

As of 2025, Estonia has a wind power installed capacity of about 705 MW. All operational wind farms in the country are on land. Offshore wind farms are planned on Lake Peipus and in the Baltic Sea near the island of Hiiumaa.

Estonia operates a rare earth elements processing facility, one of the few outside China, and is developing Europe's first plant for producing rare earth permanent magnets, essential for electric vehicles and wind turbines. Production is expected to start in 2025.

== Onshore wind energy ==
Three major offshore projects are planned in Estonia, with a total capacity of 1490 MW: a 700 MW project near the island of Hiiumaa by Nelja Energia, a 600 MW project in Gulf of Riga by Eesti Energia, and a 190 MW farm near the western coast of Estonia by Neugrund OÜ.

The International Energy Agency’s (IEA) 2023 energy policy review for Estonia highlights the nation's shift towards renewables, emphasizing reduced reliance on oil shale and the development of wind, photovoltaic (PV), and biomass. Estonia aims for climate neutrality by 2050 and 100% renewable electricity by 2030. Energy auctions, in effect since January 2021, stimulate investment in onshore wind. They use a reverse auction mechanism, offering a maximum subsidy of 20 euros per megawatt-hour (MWh), with a bid cap of 45 euros per MWh. Projects receive 12 years of support from initial generation. Past auctions allocated substantial support to photovoltaic (PV) and wind projects. An auction in September 2023 focused on wind generation, targeting 650 gigawatt-hours (GWh). Future auctions in 2024 and 2025 emphasize wind, aiming for 500 GWh each.

Estonia is advancing its renewable energy initiatives by addressing wind turbine height restrictions, which were imposed due to potential interference with aviation radars. With an investment of EUR 74.5 million between 2019 and 2022 for radar upgrades, and a similar budget allocated in 2022, Estonia plans to lift these restrictions across most of the mainland by 2025.

== Statistics ==
The table below shows the installed capacity and production of wind farms in Estonia:

| Year | 2002 | 2003 | 2004 | 2005 | 2006 | 2007 | 2008 | 2009 | 2010 | 2011 |
|---|---|---|---|---|---|---|---|---|---|---|
| Installed capacity (MW) | 2.25 | 2.25 | 2.25 | 31.65 | 31.65 | 58 | 77.7 | 141.7 | 148.6 | 183.9 |
| Production (GWh) | 1 | 6 | 8 | 54 | 76 | 91 | 133 | 172 | 299 | 373 |
| Year | 2012 | 2013 | 2014 | 2017 | 2018 | 2019 | 2020 | 2023 | 2024 | 2025 |
| Installed capacity (MW) | 269.4 | 279.9 | 302.7 | 309.96 | 309.96 | 320 | 320 | 376 | 694 | 705 |
| Production (GWh) | 466 | 552 | | | | 690 | 823 | 701 | 1164 | 1164 |

== Offshore wind energy ==
Estonia is in the early stages of offshore wind energy development, as highlighted by the IEA's 2023 Energy Policy Review. Currently, no operational offshore wind generation exists in Estonia. Nevertheless, the government recognizes the potential of offshore wind to contribute significantly to its climate targets. Estonia has proactively taken steps, including the development of a marine spatial plan and active participation in regional cooperation through the Baltic Energy Market Interconnection Plan. This cooperative initiative aims to expedite offshore grid development, secure financing, and advance Baltic offshore wind projects. Estonia's involvement in ELWIND, a cross-border offshore wind project with Latvia, further enhances regional energy independence and green energy production.

== See also ==
- Energy in Estonia
- Renewable energy by country
