= Wind power in Belarus =

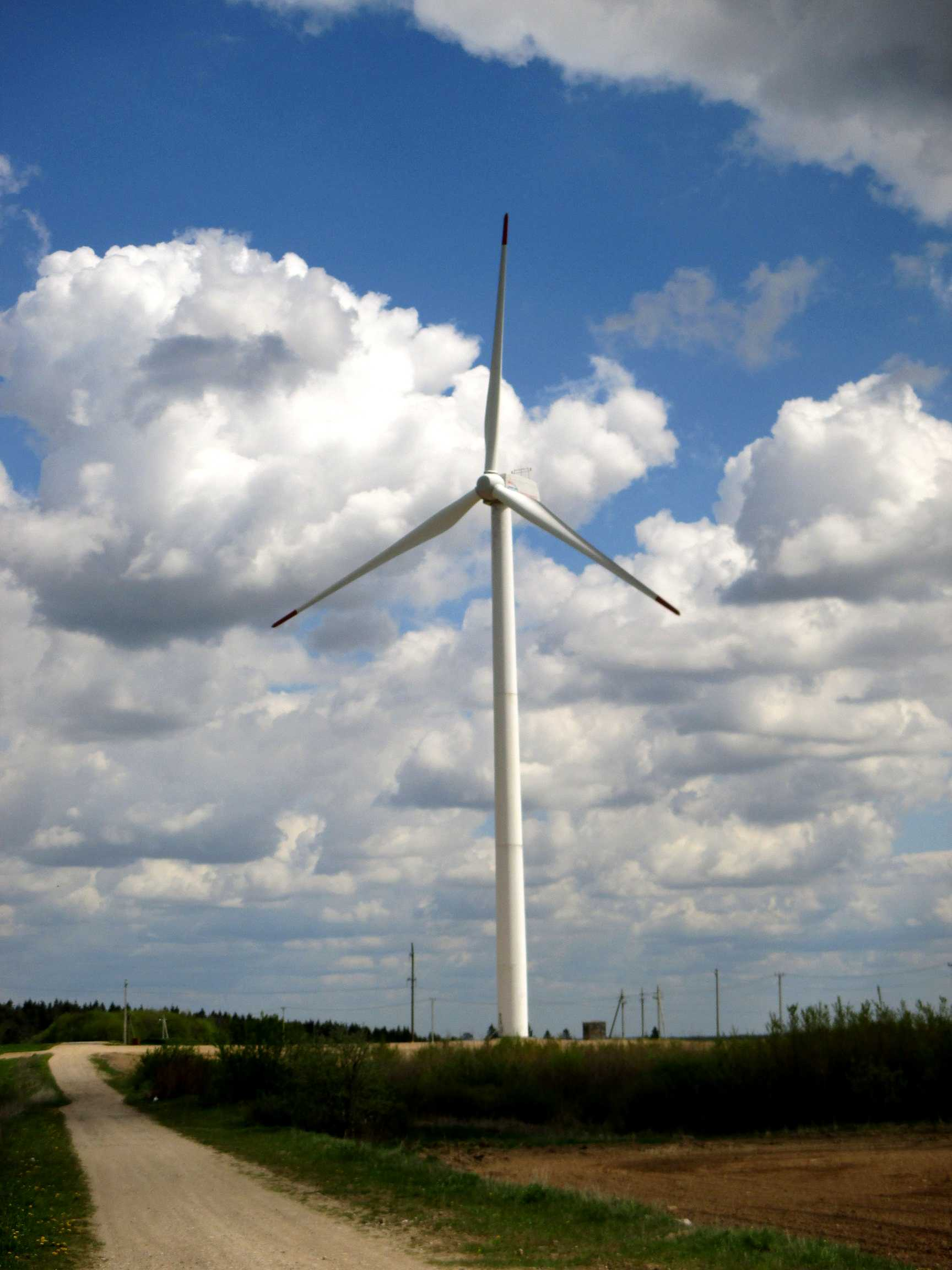
Wind generator near Hrabnyky

Wind power in Belarus is a form of renewable energy, which along with solar power, is one of the most important sectors of renewable energy in Belarus, but remains underutilized as of 2021. As of 2019, there is one 106 MW wind farm. New wind power is hindered by government quotas and the lack of auctions.

== Energy transition ==
In a September 2022 article, the United Nations Development Programme (UNDP) highlighted the country's efforts to prioritize carbon-neutral technologies in its energy mix to reduce reliance on imports. The government aims for a 9% share of renewable energy by 2035, as outlined in the Concept of Energy Security. Wind energy, with favorable speeds and declining costs, is emerging as an alternative. The UNDP, in collaboration with Belarus, studied measures to encourage private investment in wind power, aiming to advance climate goals under the Paris Agreement.

== Wind resources ==
The country has identified 1640 points where it is possible to install wind power plants, although the wind speed over the territory of Belarus is on average no more than 3.5–5 m/s, and for the economic benefit of wind turbines it should reach 7–12 m/s. The best conditions for wind power are observed on the hills near Navahrudak, Oshmiansk, Minsk, and Orsha.

== Main enterprises ==
Until the year 2010, individual units already operated in the Minsk and Grodno regions. By 2017, the largest of the wind energy facilities is Navahrudak wind park, which belongs to the RUE branch «Grodnoenergo» Lida energy networks. The first wind generator appeared here near the village Hrabnyky in 2011. The windbreak showed good results. In 2016, close to installed 5 similar installations of the Chinese company «HEAG». The Creation of a wind park cost the state 13 million dollars. Annual electricity generation is about 22 million kWh. Such an amount of generated energy allows us to save 4.5 million cubic meters of gas per year (700 000-800 000 dollars). The station is serviced by 10 certified employees of "Grodnoenergo".

In 2017, there were about 47 facilities in the country where wind turbines are operated with a total installed capacity of 84 MW. By 2020, the commissioning of wind power stations is expected in the Smorgon (15 MW), Oshmyany (25 MW), Liozno (50 MW) and Dzerzhinsky (160 MW) regions.

Despite previous forecasts of the power capacity of wind turbines in Belarus reaching 289 MW by 2020, connected wind turbines had a power capacity of only 102.7 MW. According to forecasts, the power capacity of wind turbines will reach about 500 MW by 2030.

== Sources ==
- Wind Energy Potential in Belarus
- The tailwind: How Belarus is developing wind energy
- New report: Wind-power market in Belarus 2016 to 2025
