= Wind power in Russia =

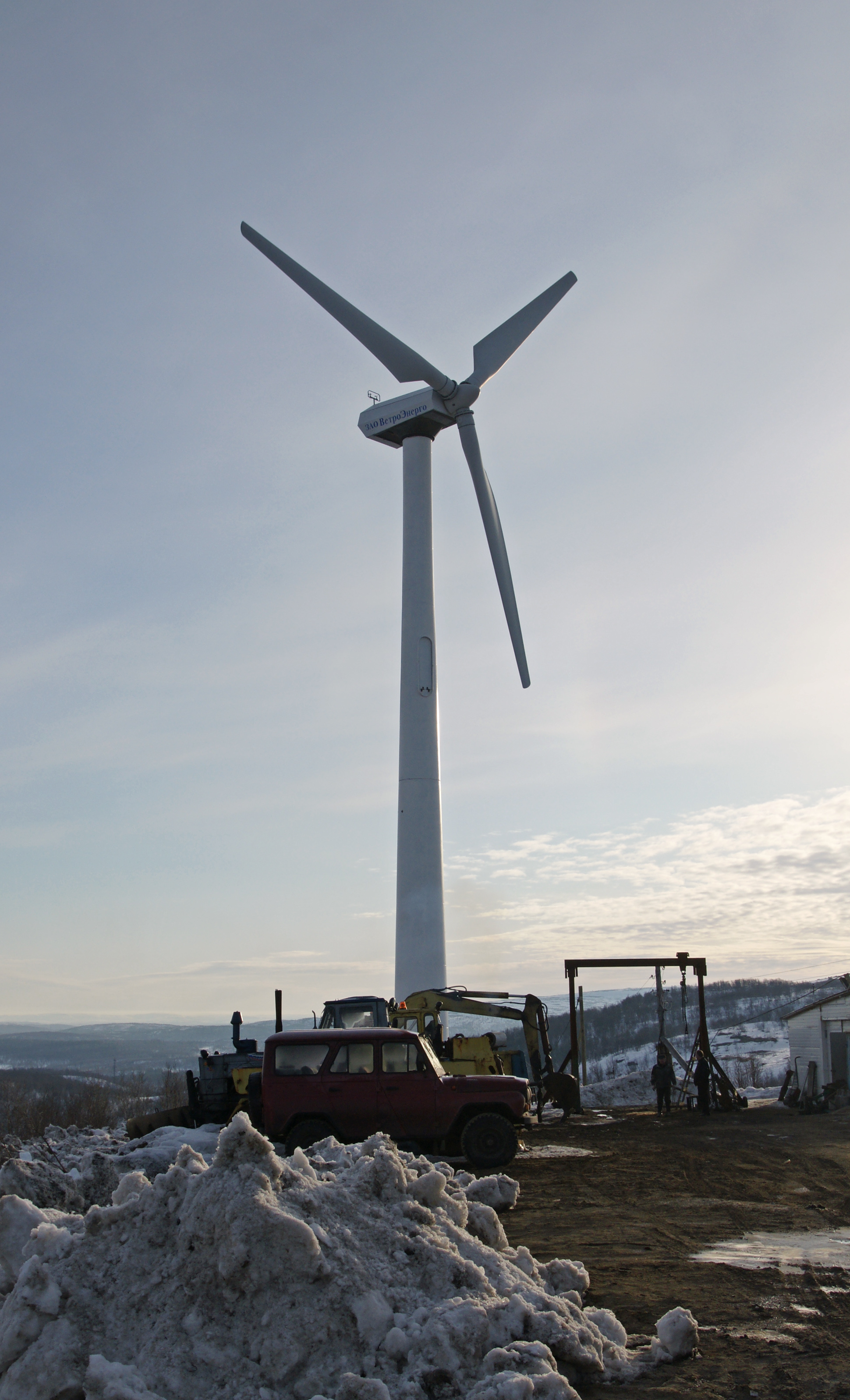
Wind turbine near an Omni Hotel, Murmansk. The wind power potential of Murmansk Oblast is one of the largest among regions of Russian.

Wind power in Russia has a long history of small-scale use, but the country has not yet developed large-scale commercial wind energy production. Most of its current limited wind production is located in agricultural areas with low population densities, where connection to the main energy grid is difficult. By 2018, Russia had a total installed wind capacity of 106 MW, a nearly ten-fold increase over 2016 but still a tiny share of the country's potential.

Russia is estimated to have a total potential of 80,000 TWh/yr for wind energy, 6,218 TWh/yr of which is economically feasible. Most of this potential is found in the southern steppes and the seacoasts of the country, although in many of these areas the population density is very low, at less than 1 person per km^{2}. This low population density means that there is little existing electricity infrastructure currently in place, which hinders development of these resources.

Current Russian wind energy projects have a combined capacity of over 1,700 MW, although less than 17 MW had been installed as of the end of 2010. The Russian Wind Energy Association predicts that if Russia achieves its goal of having 4.5% of its energy come from renewable sources by 2020, the country will have a total wind capacity of 7,000 MW.

In 2010, plans for the construction of a wind power plant in Yeisk, on the Sea of Azov, were announced. It is expected to initially have a capacity of 50 MW, which will become 100 MW a year later. German engineering company Siemens announced in July 2010, following a visit to Russia by Chancellor Angela Merkel, that it would build wind power plants in Russia. By 2015, the company hoped to install 1,250 MW of capacity in Russia. As of 2015, capacity was only 15.4 MW.

== History ==
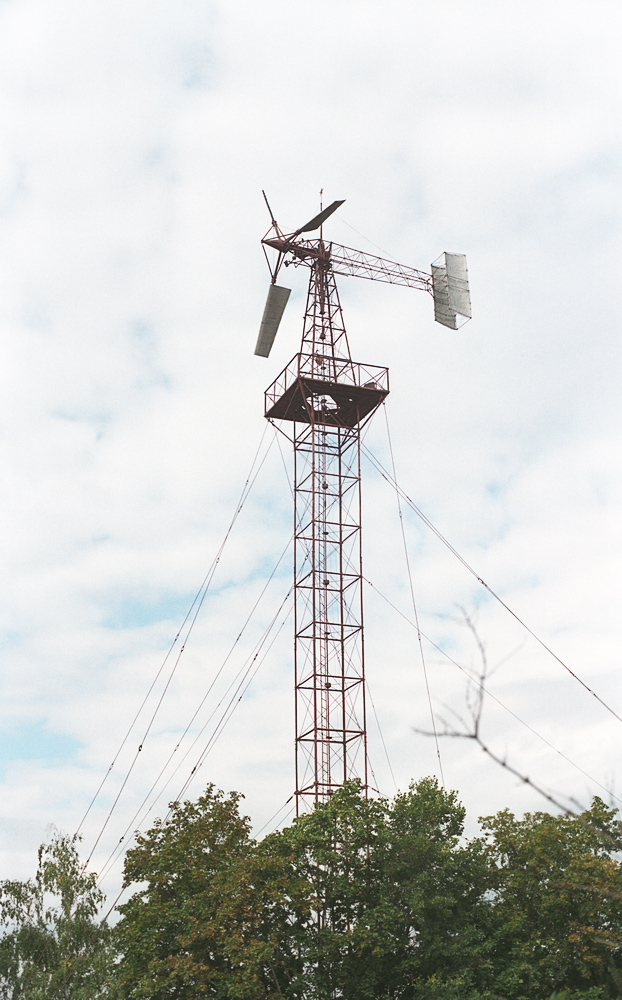
Ufimtsev's wind generator in Kursk, September 2007

The first experimental wind power plant (3.5 kW) in the Soviet Union was built in 1931 in Kursk by the project of engineers Ufimtsev and Vetchinkin. To conserve energy during calm winds, a 328 kg flywheel contained in a vacuum chamber was used. The wind generator provided electricity to Ufimtsev's house, including a workshop with machine tools, and also illuminated several other houses along the Semenovskaya street. For more details, see article in Russian wiki.

The experimental wind farm in Balaclava (in Crimea) with capacity of 100 kW was developed under direction of inventor Yuri Kondratyuk and installed there in 1931. Before the war, it produced electricity for the Balaclava-Sevastopol tramline. During the war it was destroyed.

From 1932 Kondratyuk, together with Nikolai Nikitin, worked on a design of 165-metre high reinforced concrete mast on the Bedene-Kir plateau, four kilometers north of the peak of windy mountain Ai-Petri in Crimea. It was expected to produce up to 24 MW of power. After the death of project sponsor Sergo Ordzhonikidze in 1937 the project was reduced in scale and in 1938 the construction stopped forever.

57 wind turbines are being built 80 kilometres northeast of Murmansk, at the Kolskaya Wind Farm. The farm is expected to be operational in 2021.

According to a Reuters report from 2024, Rosatom, Russia's state nuclear corporation, established a wind turbine blade manufacturing facility in Ulyanovsk at a site previously used by Vestas. The facility has an annual production capacity of 450 blades and is expected to support both domestic and international wind energy projects. The initiative follows Vestas' exit from Russia in 2023 due to sanctions, leading to Rosatom's efforts to develop local production.

In the 2020s, new capacity was developed mainly through the federal Renewable Capacity Delivery Agreement (RES-CDA) mechanism, which requires increasing localisation of turbine components. Rosatom reports that towers, nacelles and blades for its current wind projects are produced domestically at its facilities in Volgodonsk. In January 2025, Rosatom’s wind-power subsidiary NovaWind JSC installed the first turbine at the construction site of the upcoming Novolakskaya Wind Power Plant in the Republic of Dagestan, which planned to have 120 turbines, and that would make it one of the largest onshore wind facilities in Russia with a 300 MW capacity. Upon completion, the facility is expected to contribute significantly toward Rosatom’s long term stated goal of achieving approximately 1.7 GW of cumulative installed wind capacity by 2027. Wind power in Russia remains a small component of the national electricity mix, contributing less than 1% of total generation, while thermal power continues to account for the majority of electricity production.

== List of wind farms ==
Map of current major wind farms

Wind farms
Name	Status	Capacity (MW)	Developer	Commercial operation	Location	Notes
Adygea	Operational	150	NovaWind	1 March 2020	44°57′58″N 40°03′44″E	60×2.5MW turbines
Berestovskaya	Operational	60	NovaWind	1 January 2023	45°30′59″N 42°02′04″E	24×2.5MW turbines
Bondarevskaya	Operational	120	NovaWind	1 September 2021	45°39′37″N 43°03′34″E	48×2.5MW turbines
Chukotka Wind	Operational	2.5	NovaWind	?	65°37′47.9″N 171°41′23.9″E	?
Gukovskaya	Operational	100	Fortum	1 June 2020	48°05′39″N 39°57′24″E	26×3.8MW turbines
Kamenskaya	Operational	100	Fortum	1 April 2020	48°11′05″N 40°17′03″E	26×3.8MW turbines
Karmalinovskaya	Operational	60	NovaWind	1 April 2021	45°27′36″N 41°14′21″E	24×2.5MW turbines
Kazachya	Operational	50	Fortum	1 December 2020	48°18′44″N 40°06′52″E	12×4.2MW turbines
Kochubeevskaya	Operational	210	NovaWind	1 January 2021	44°43′24″N 42°01′19″E	84×2.5MW turbines
Kulikovskaya	Dismantled	5.1		1998	55°37′48″N 63°39′35.9″E	1×0.6MW 20×0.225MW turbines, Dismantled in 2018
Marchenkovskaya	Operational	120	NovaWind	1 July 2021	47°03′55″N 42°34′48″E	48×2.5MW turbines
Medvezhenskaya	Operational	60	NovaWind	1 December 2021	45°31′32″N 42°08′10″E	24×2.5MW turbines
Murmansk	Operational	0.2	PJSC EL5-Energo(formerly Enel Russia)	1 March 2023	68°59′35″N 33°7′6.4″E	Kolskaya wind farm
Orenburg	Operational	1			51°46′59.9″N 55°6′0″E	
Priyutnenskaya VES	Operational	2.4			46°12′32″N 44°09′26″E	ALTEN Ltd.
Rostov Wtg	Operational	0.3			57°12′0″N 39°27′0″E	
Sulinskaya	Operational	100	Fortum	1 March 2020	48°11′05″N 40°17′03″E	26×3.8MW turbines
Tselinskaya	Operational	100	Fortum	1 December 2020	47°01′19″N 44°13′32″E	24×4.2MW turbines
Tyupkeldy	Operational	2.5			54°36′0″N 53°43′47.9″E	Experimental power plant, Bashkortostan
Ulyanovskaya-1	Operational	35	Fortum	1 January 2018	54°19′0″N 48°22′0″E	14×2.5MW turbines
Ulyanovskaya-2	Operational	50	Fortum	1 January 2019	54°19′0″N 48°22′0″E	14×3.6MW turbines
Ushakovskaya	Operational	5.1		23 October 2018	55°37′48″N 63°39′35.9″E	3×1.7MW turbines; replaced Kulikovskaya
Yeisk	Operational	72			46°28′N 38°19′E	Krasnodar territory, Sea of Azov
Total operational	22	1276				

== See also ==
- Renewable energy in Russia
- Geothermal power in Russia
- Wind power
- Renewable energy by country
