= Wind power in Serbia =

Wind power is a fledgling source of renewable energy in Serbia. In 2023, the wind power provided 1,068 GWh (7.5%) of the total electricity generated in Serbia, up from 48 GWh (0.15%) in 2017. Wind power is the second most favored energy source by the Serbian public, second only to solar energy.

== Plants ==
The first wind farm was opened in 2011 and is located in Leskova, Tutin; it has an installed capacity of 600 KW. In 2015, a wind farm near Kula was opened with an installed capacity of 9.9 MW; it was constructed by MK Fintel Wind. La Pikolina (6.6 MW) wind farm near Vršac was opened in 2016.

Malibunar (8 MW) went online in 2017. Alibunar (42 MW) went online in 2018.

In 2019 three wind farms went online: Košava near Vršac (69 MW), Čibuk 1 near Kovin (158 MW) and Kovačica (104 MW).

Plant	Location	Opened / initial operation	Capacity (MW)
Čibuk 1	Kovin	2019	158.0
Čibuk 2	Kovin	2026	154.0
Krivača	Krivača	2024	105.6
Kovačica	Kovačica	2019	104.5
Pupin	Kovačica	2024	94.5
Košava I	Vršac	2019	69.0
Kostolac	Kostolac	2025	66.0
Alibunar	Alibunar	2018	42.0
Kula	Kula	2016	9.9
Alibunar 1	Alibunar	2023	9.0
Malibunar	Alibunar	2017	8.0
La Piccolina	Vršac	2016	6.6
Devreč 1	Tutin	2012	0.5

The years indicate opening or initial operation, rather than a uniform date of full commercial operation. Kostolac's entry refers to the start of trial operation; in July 2026 the Ministry of Mining and Energy still reported a standstill in completing the project.

Cumulative nameplate capacity of the wind farms listed above, by year of opening or initial operation (including trial operation), in megawatts. This is a sum of the listed projects, rather than an official national capacity series.

Several projects are still under development, including the 854 MW Maestrale Ring project near Subotica (launched in 2023), the 154 MW Čibuk 2 project near Kovin (launched in 2024), and the 300 MW Vitello project near Pančevo (launched in 2026).

== See also ==
- Renewable energy commercialization
- Renewable energy in the European Union
- Renewable energy in Serbia
- Renewable energy by country
- Wind power in Bulgaria
