= WindEurope =

Wind energy association

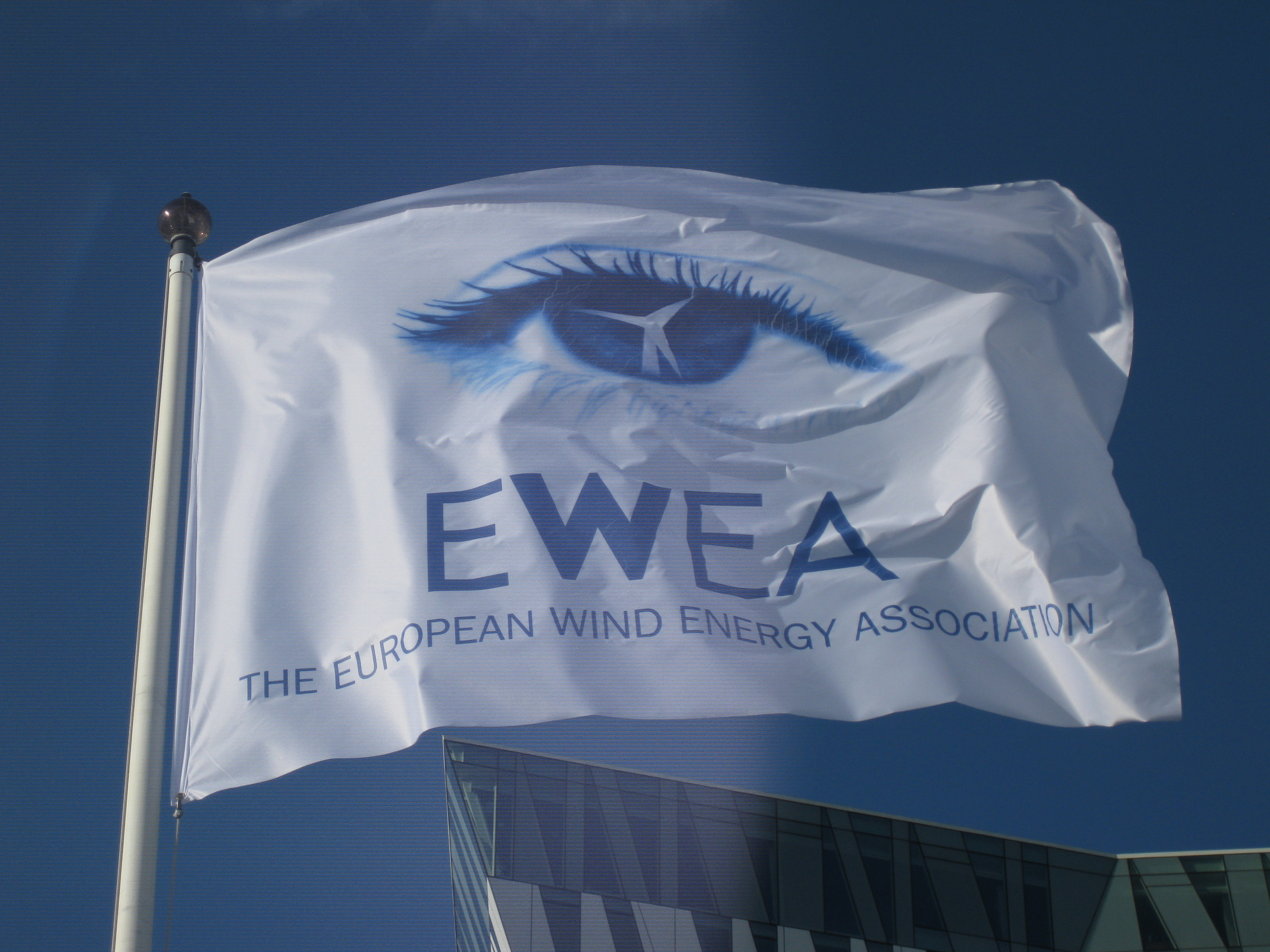
- Flag with logo outside the EWEA 2012 Annual Event at Bella Center, Copenhagen
- Headquarters: Brussels, Belgium
- Members: 517
- CEO: Tinne Van der Straeten
- Deputy CEO: Malgosia Bartosik
- Chief Operating Officer: Oliver Wykes
- Chief Policy Officer: Pierre Tardieu
- Website: windeurope.org
- Formerly called: European Wind Energy Association

WindEurope is an association promoting the use of wind power in Europe. Based in Brussels it has over 600 members, which are active in over 50 countries, including manufacturers with a leading share of the world wind power market, component suppliers, research institutes, national wind and renewables associations, developers, contractors, electricity providers, finance companies, insurance companies, and consultants.

Founded in 1982, WindEurope was called previously called EWEA, the European Wind Energy Association.

WindEurope is the founder of the Global Wind Energy Council and remains a Board Member today.

== See also ==
- Wind power in Europe
- Renewable energy in the European Union
- List of renewable energy organizations
- World Wind Energy Association (WWEA)
- American Wind Energy Association
