= List of wind farms in Romania =

The Fântânele-Cogealac Wind Farm

As of 2013, there was an installed capacity of 2,599 megawatts (MW) of wind power in Romania, up from the 7 MW installed capacity in 2007. Until December 2010, Romania added around 440 MW to its installed wind capacity from two wind farms: Fântânele-Cogealac and the EDP Peștera. The Fântânele-Cogealac Wind Farm has been completed in 2012 and at the time was the largest in Europe.

Romania has a wind-power potential of around 14,000 MW, and an energy-generating capacity of 23 terawatt-hours. The country's wind power capacity that can be assimilated by the national transport grid is between 3,000 MW and 9,000 MW, while only in the last two years the total power of the requests for connecting to it was about 22.800 MW. The Dobrogea region, which consists of Constanța and Tulcea counties, has the second-highest wind potential in Europe.

Several companies are interested in investing in wind farms in Romania. The Italian company Enel Green Power, a subsidiary of Enel, plans to build several wind farms with a total capacity of 350 MW. The Swiss conglomerate Cofra Group plans to build two large wind farms, one that will have a capacity of 700 MW in Dobruja and one that will have a capacity of 400 MW in Neamț and Suceava counties; the total investment will amount to $1.65 billion. In 2008, Iberdrola bought 50 wind farm projects, with a combined installed capacity 1,600 MW, from two companies for $450 million. Romanian companies interested in building wind farms include Electrica and Green Energy, which have plans to build wind farms that will have an installed capacity of 310 MW with total investments of $420 million. The Hungarian company Sinus Holding will build five wind farms in the Northern Moldavia region, having an installed capacity of 700 MW and totaling $800 million in capital investment, that will be built by December 2009.

The Romania Wind Energy Market size was valued at 3.47 gigawatt in 2025 and estimated to grow from 3.61 gigawatt in 2026 to reach 4.42 gigawatt by 2031, at a CAGR of 4.12% during the forecast period of 2026 through 2031.

== Under development ==
The forthcoming 600 MW wind project, Dunarea East and West, situated in southeastern Romania, is scheduled to commence operations in 2026. This project's significant scale is compared with the nearby Fântânele-Cogealac wind power plant, currently the largest onshore wind facility in Europe, with a capacity of 600 MW.

Romania is expected to establish its first wind farms in the Black Sea by 2027-2028, following a public consultation by the Ministry of Energy on a draft law for offshore wind energy. The plan includes auctioning 3 GW of offshore wind under a contract-for-difference scheme.

BIG MEGA Renewable Energy, a joint venture between Israeli publicly listed companies BIG Shopping Centers and MEGA OR Holdings, secured project financing in 2024 and 2026 for 102 MW wind farms in Urleasca and Vacareni, Romania, totaling over.

== Largest projects ==
These are the most important wind farm projects in Romania (larger than 10 MW):

Project name	Sponsoring company	Installed capacity (MW)	County	Status	Completed/ Notes
Activ Business Casimcea	Activ Business	45	Tulcea	Approved	
Eco Power	Eco Power	80	Buzău	Approved	
EDP Dobrogea	Energias de Portugal	225	Tulcea	Approved	
EDP Peștera Wind Farm	Energias de Portugal	90	Constanța	Commissioned	
EDP Cernavodă Wind Farm	Energias de Portugal	134	Constanța	Commissioned	
Enel Agighiol	Enel Green Power	34	Tulcea	Commissioned	
Babadag I & II	Martifer	42	Tulcea	Commissioned	
Blue Investment Baia	Blue Investment	35	Tulcea	Under construction	
Blue Planet Baia	Blue Planet Investments	35	Tulcea	Under construction	
Cudalbi 2	Eximprod	38	Galați	Commissioned	
Fălciu-Berezeni	E.ON	30	Vaslui	Under construction	
Călimani	West Wind	27	Suceava	Approved	
Oravița	Local authorities	10	Caraș-Severin	Commissioned	
Enel Corugea	Enel Green Power	70	Tulcea	Under construction	
Eolgen Racovițeni	Eolgen	45	Buzău	Proposed	
Roșiești	E.ON	46	Vaslui	Approved	
EOL Săcele	Electrica and Holrom	50	Constanța	Approved	
Eolica Baia	Eolica Dobrogea	126	Tulcea	Approved	
Eolica Beidaud	Eolica Dobrogea	128	Tulcea	Approved	
Eolica Casimcea	Eolica Dobrogea	244	Tulcea	Approved	
Eolica Ceamurlia South	Eolica Dobrogea	28	Tulcea	Approved	
Eolica Cogealac	Eolica Dobrogea	448	Constanța	Approved	
Corbița	Energycum	50	Vrancea	Approved	
Eolica Corbu	Eolica Dobrogea	68	Constanța	Approved	
Fântânele-Cogealac	CEZ Group	600	Constanța	Commissioned	2012
Eolica Grădina	Eolica Dobrogea	62	Constanța	Approved	
Eolica Istria	Eolica Dobrogea	74	Constanța	Approved	
Eolica Kogălniceanu	Eolica Dobrogea	32	Constanța	Approved	
Eolica Mihai Viteazu	Eolica Dobrogea	80	Constanța	Under construction	
Eolica Pantelimon	Eolica Dobrogea	66	Constanța	Approved	
Eolica Săcele	Eolica Dobrogea	252	Constanța	Approved	
Eolica Sarichioi	Eolica Dobrogea	102	Tulcea	Approved	
Eolica Târgușor	Eolica Dobrogea	36	Constanța	Approved	
Vetrișoaia	E.ON	36	Vaslui	Approved	
Eolus Vind	Eolus Vind	30	Constanța	Approved	
Europp Galați	Europp Energocons	33	Galați	Approved	
Eximprod Galați	Eximprod Buzău	70	Galați	Approved	
Green Energy	Green Energy	200	Tulcea	Approved	
Liteni-Dolhasca	Ulli Rowind	34	Suceava	Under construction	
Market Expert Tulcea	Market Expert	33	Tulcea	Approved	
Mărișelu	Local authorities	300	Cluj	Approved	
Moldova Noua	Enel Green Power	48	Caraș-Severin	Commissioned	2012
New Energy Constanța	New Energy Group	30	Constanța	Under construction	
New Energy Tulcea	New Energy Group	20	Tulcea	Approved	
Orșova	Toplet Energy	35	Mehedinți	Under construction	
Romwind Constanța	Romwind	30	Constanța	Approved	
Sălbatica I	Enel Green Power	70	Tulcea	Commissioned	2011
Sălbatica II	Enel Green Power	70	Tulcea	Commissioned	2012
Sibioara	Sibioara Wind Farm	42	Vaslui	Approved	
Sinus Holding	Sinus Holding	700	Vaslui/Suceava/Neamț	Approved	
Tarcău	Eolo Energy	24	Neamț	Approved	
Tomis Team Dobrogea	Tomis Team	600	Tulcea/Constanța	Under construction	
Valea Nucarilor	Enel Green Power	70	Tulcea	Commissioned	2012
Văcăreni	Energie Investments Group	240	Tulcea	Proposed	
Verbund Casimcea	Verbund	225	Tulcea	Commissioned	
Scobinți-Iași	ACK srl Romania	40	Iași	Approved	
Ruginoasa-Iași	Moldova-Eolian srl Romania	100	Iași	Proposed	
Siminoc - Murfatlar	Zar Twins Energy	45	Constanța	Approved	
Nalbant Tulcea	Philro Energia	20	Tulcea	Approved	

=== Totals ===
Category status	Total capacity
Commissioned	2,599 MW
Under construction	MW
Approved	MW
Proposed	MW
All Stages	MW

== See also ==
- Global Wind Energy Council
- World Wind Energy Association (WWEA)
- European Wind Energy Association
- Wind power
- Wind power in the European Union
- List of wind farms
- List of onshore wind farms
- List of large wind farms
- Wind turbine
- List of wind turbine manufacturers
- Wind power industry
