= EDP =

EDP may refer to:

== Organisations ==
=== Companies ===
- EDP Group, a Portuguese energy company
- Electronic Dream Plant, a British manufacturer of electronic musical instruments
- EDP Renováveis, a Spanish renewable energy company
  - EDP Renewables North America, subsidiary of EDP Renováveis
- EDP Brasil, a Brazilian electrical utility company

=== Politics ===
- English Democrats Party, a political party
- Equality and Democracy Party, a former political party in Turkey
- European Democratic Party, a centrist and social-liberal European political party

=== Other organizations ===
- Eastern Daily Press, a UK regional newspaper
- EDP Sciences, a French publisher

== Science, technology, and medicine ==
- Emergency disconnect package, a unit used in oil well intervention
- Energy–delay product in digital electronics
- Epoxydocosapentaenoic acid
- Estradiol dipropionate (EDP), an estrogen
  - Estradiol dipropionate/hydroxyprogesterone caproate (EDP/OHPC)
- Esquisse d'un Programme, a mathematical monograph by Alexandre Grothendieck
- Ethylenediamine pyrocatechol, an anisotropic wet etchant for silicon in microelectromechanical fabrication
- Emergency depressurization, an industrial safety system
- Emotionally disturbed person, see Emotional disturbance (disambiguation)
- End diastolic pressure, part of the Pressure–volume loop in cardiology
- EDP Peștera Wind Farm, a wind farm in Romania
- EDP Cernavodă Wind Farm, a wind farm in Romania
- EDP Dobrogea Wind Farm, a wind farm in Romania
- EDP Sarichioi Wind Farm, a wind farm in Romania
- Event-driven pharmacology, a therapeutic paradigm characteristic of targeted protein degradation

=== Computing ===
- Electronic data processing, the use of automated methods to process commercial data
- Embedded DisplayPort (eDP), a digital display interface
- European Data Portal, an initiative of the European Commission to gather public sector information
- Information technology audit, formerly electronic data processing audit (EDP audit), examination of the management controls of an Information technology (IT) infrastructure

== Other uses ==
- EDP445, American former YouTuber (born 1990)
- Eau de Parfum, a dilution class of perfume
- Edinburgh Park railway station, Scotland (station code)
- Xingtai East railway station, China Railway telegraph code EDP
- Excessive deficit procedure, a procedure within the EU Stability and Growth Pact
- Lisbon Marathon EDP, annual marathon held in Portugal
- Valencia Marathon, also known as Marathon Valencia Trinidad Alfonso EDP, annual marathon held in Spain
- EDP Watch, a web series by JiDion

== See also ==
- European Data Protection Supervisor (EDPS)
