= Extraction of petroleum =

Removal of petroleum from the earth

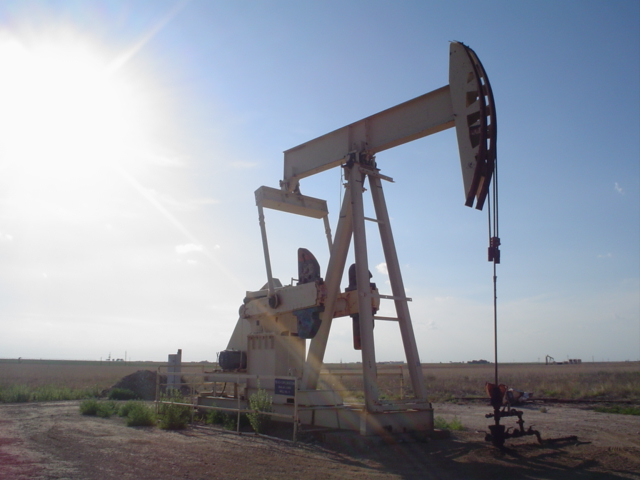
Pumpjack on an oil well in Texas

Petroleum is a fossil fuel that can be drawn from beneath the Earth's surface. Reservoirs of petroleum are formed through the mixture of plants, algae, and sediments in shallow seas under high pressure. Petroleum is mostly recovered from oil drilling. Seismic surveys and other methods are used to locate oil reservoirs. Oil rigs and oil platforms are used to drill long holes into the earth to create an oil well and extract petroleum. After extraction, oil is refined to make gasoline and other products such as tires and refrigerators. Extraction of petroleum can be dangerous and has led to oil spills.

== Locating the oil field ==
Geologists and geophysicists use seismic surveys to search for geological structures that may form oil reservoirs. The "classic" method includes making an underground explosion nearby and observing the seismic response, which provides information about the geological structures underground. However, "passive" methods that extract information from naturally occurring seismic waves are also used.

Other instruments such as gravimeters and magnetometers are also used in the search for petroleum. Extracting crude oil normally starts with drilling wells into an underground reservoir. When an oil well has been tapped, a geologist (known on the rig as the "mudlogger") will note its presence.

Historically in the United States, in some oil fields the oil rose naturally to the surface, but most of these fields have long since been used up, except in parts of Alaska. Often many wells (called multilateral wells) are drilled into the same reservoir, to an economically viable extraction rate. Some wells (secondary wells) may pump water, steam, acids or various gas mixtures into the reservoir to raise or maintain the reservoir pressure and economical extraction

== Drilling ==
The oil well is created by drilling a long hole into the earth with an oil rig. A steel pipe (casing) is placed in the hole, to provide structural integrity to the newly drilled well bore. Holes are then made in the base of the well to enable oil to pass into the bore. Finally, a collection of valves called a "Christmas tree" is fitted to the top; the valves regulate pressures and control flow. The drilling process comes under "upstream", one of the three main services in the oil industry, along with mid-stream and downstream.

== Oil extraction and recovery ==
=== Primary recovery ===
During the primary recovery stage, reservoir drive comes from a number of natural mechanisms:

- natural water displacing oil downward into the well
- expansion of the associated petroleum gas at the top of the reservoir
- expansion of the associated gas initially dissolved in the crude oil
- gravity drainage resulting from the movement of oil within the reservoir from the upper to the lower parts where well extraction is located.

Recovery factor during the primary recovery stage is typically 5-15%.

When the underground pressure in the oil reservoir is sufficient to force the oil (along with some associated gas) to the surface, all that is necessary to capture oil is to place a complex arrangement of valves (the Christmas tree) on the well head and further to connect the well to a pipeline network for storage and processing. Sometimes, during primary recovery, to increase extraction rates, pumps, such as beam pumps and electrical submersible pumps (ESPs), are used to bring the oil to the surface; these are known as artificial lifting mechanisms.

=== Secondary recovery ===
Over the lifetime of a well, the pressure falls. After natural reservoir drive diminishes and there is insufficient underground pressure to force the oil to the surface, secondary recovery methods are applied. These rely on supplying external energy to the reservoir by injecting fluids to increase reservoir pressure, hence increasing or replacing the natural reservoir drive with an artificial drive. Secondary recovery techniques increase the reservoir's pressure by water injection, gas reinjection and gas lift. Gas reinjection and lift each use associated gas, carbon dioxide or some other inert gas to reduce the density of the oil-gas mixture; improving its mobility. The typical recovery factor from water injection operations is about 30%, depending on the properties of the oil and the characteristics of the reservoir rock. On average, the recovery factor after primary and secondary oil recovery operations is between 35 and 45%.

=== Enhanced recovery ===
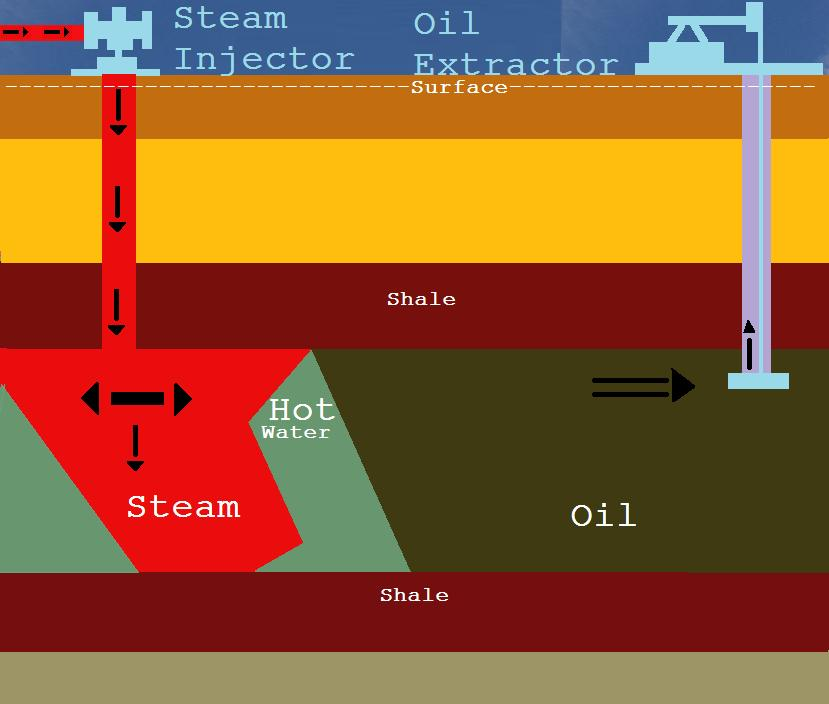
Steam is injected into many oil fields where the oil is thicker and heavier than normal crude oil.

Enhanced, or tertiary oil recovery methods, further increase mobility of the oil in order to increase extraction.

Thermally enhanced oil recovery methods (TEOR) are tertiary recovery techniques that heat the oil, reducing its viscosity and making it easier to extract. Steam injection is the most common form of TEOR, and it is often done with a cogeneration plant. This type of cogeneration plant uses a gas turbine to generate electricity, and the waste heat is used to produce steam, which is then injected into the reservoir. This form of recovery is used extensively to increase oil extraction in the San Joaquin Valley, which yields a very heavy oil, yet accounts for ten percent of the United States' oil extraction. Fire flooding (In-situ burning) is another form of TEOR, but instead of steam, some of the oil is burned to heat the surrounding oil.

Occasionally, surfactants (detergents) are injected to alter the surface tension between the water and the oil in the reservoir, mobilizing oil which would otherwise remain in the reservoir as residual oil.

Another method to reduce viscosity is carbon dioxide flooding.

Tertiary recovery allows another 5% to 15% of the reservoir's oil to be recovered. In some California heavy oil fields (such as Midway-Sunset Oil Field), steam injection has doubled or even tripled the oil reserves and ultimate oil recovery.

Tertiary recovery begins when secondary oil recovery is not enough to continue adequate extraction, but only when the oil can still be extracted profitably. This depends on the cost of the extraction method and the current price of crude oil. When prices are high, previously unprofitable wells are brought back into use, and when they are low, extraction is curtailed.

The use of microbial treatments is another tertiary recovery method. Special blends of the microbes are used to treat and break down the hydrocarbon chain in oil, making the oil easy to recover. It is also more economical versus other conventional methods. In some states such as Texas, there are tax incentives for using these microbes in what is called a secondary tertiary recovery. Very few companies supply these microbes.

== Recovery rates ==
The amount of recoverable oil is determined by a number of factors:

- permeability of the rock
- strength of natural drives (the associated gas present, pressure from adjacent water or gravity)
- porosity of the reservoir rock, i.e. the rock storage capacity
- viscosity of the oil

When the reservoir rocks are "tight", as in shale, oil generally cannot flow through, but when they are permeable, as in sandstone, oil flows freely.

== Estimated ultimate recovery ==
Although recovery of a well cannot be known with certainty until the well ceases production, petroleum engineers often determine an estimated ultimate recovery (EUR) based on decline rate projections years into the future. Various models, mathematical techniques, and approximations are used.

Shale gas EUR is difficult to predict, and it is possible to choose recovery methods that tend to underestimate decline of the well beyond that which is reasonable.

== Health and safety ==
The oil and gas extraction workforce faces unique health and safety challenges and is recognized by the National Institute for Occupational Safety and Health (NIOSH) as a priority industry sector in the National Occupational Research Agenda (NORA) to identify and provide intervention strategies regarding occupational health and safety issues. During 2003–2013, the annual rate of occupational fatalities significantly decreased 36.3%; however, the number of work-related fatalities in the U.S. oil and gas extraction industry increased 27.6%, with a total of 1,189 deaths because the size of the workforce grew during this period. Two-thirds of all worker fatalities were attributed to transportation incidents and contact with objects or equipment. More than 50% of persons fatally injured were employed by companies that service wells. Hazard controls include land transportation safety policies and engineering controls such as automated technologies.

In 2023, the CDC published that 470 workers had died from 2014 to 2019.

When oil and gas are burned they release carbon dioxide into the air. Fossil fuels, such as oil, are responsible for 89% of the carbon dioxide emissions. Carbon emissions cause climate change which negatively impacts people's safety by raising sea levels and worsening weather.

Oil can also cause oil spills, which pollutes the ocean.

== See also ==
- Blowout (well drilling) – Uncontrolled release of crude oil and/or natural gas from a well
- Deep well drilling – Using a drilling rig to bore holes for petroleum extraction in deep sea
- Directional drilling – Practice of drilling non-vertical bores
- Driller (oil) – Leader in charge during well drilling
- Drilling fluid – Aid for drilling boreholes into the ground
- Drilling rig – Integrated system to drill wells
- Emergency disconnect package
- Hydraulic fracturing – Fracturing bedrock by pressurized liquid
- Inland Petroleum Distribution System – Fuel infrastructure of the US military
- List of countries by oil production
- List of natural gas and oil production accidents in the United States
- List of petroleum industry occupations
- Mud logger – Creation of a detailed record of a borehole
- Oil platform – Offshore ocean structure with oil drilling and related facilities
- Peak Oil – Point in time when the maximum rate of petroleum extraction is reached
- Roughneck – Person whose job is hard labor
- Universal Master Control Station – System that controls and retrieves data from subsea equipment on the ocean floor.
