= History of the Tejo Power Station =

Tejo Power Station seen from the Tagus River (Rio Tejo).

The history of the Tejo Power Station, operating from 1908 to 1975 in the Belém district of Lisbon, Portugal.

== Introduction ==
As the latter 19th century advanced, Lisbon's rate of urbanisation and electricity consumption was outgrowing existing power generation stations. The two power stations that supplied the city with electricity were the Avenida Power Station (1889) and the Boavista Power Station (1903). Their names were intimately connected to their locations. It was for this same reason that during the Tejo Power Station's initial stages, toponymy remained in use and it was originally named the Junqueira Power Station, being located in the Junqueira district. Despite everything, this name didn't last long since, once construction was concluded, official documents and the plant's facade took on the name of the Tagus River (Rio Tejo) it was built on, as the Tejo Power Station.

== The original Tejo Power Station ==
The small power plants that existed in the capital (Avenida and Boavista Power Stations) became obsolete due to the increasing demand for electric power. Furthermore, they were located in heavily urbanised neighbourhoods, thereby exerting a strong environmental impact on the residents and presenting a lack of space for the more than predictable expansions that the new electricity industry was going to require. For these reasons, at the beginning of 1908, the company that held the concession to produce and distribute electric power in Lisbon, the Companhias Reunidas de Gás e Electricidade (CRGE - United Gas and Electric Companies) undertook construction of a new thermoelectric power station in Lisbon. In the operating license, they asked for permission to install a "new power generating station", located in a manufacturing district that went from the Navy Dockyard to Pedrouços beach, in the western part of the city.

The chosen location was situated halfway between the Belém Palace and the Junqueira National Rope Factory, which still exist today. Thus, after raising the capital to finance the new thermoelectric power station, in March 1908 construction began on the plant that would provide Lisbon and the surrounding area with electricity for more than six decades.

The final technical project was created by engineer Lucien Neu, who made the most of all the usable space by placing the turbines in the central area and the boilers on either side. This project underwent several alterations, with the construction work extending for longer than had initially been programmed. The company responsible for constructing the buildings was Vieillard & Touzet, who maintained approximately 50 workers on the site. In the summer of 1909, the Tejo Power Station was officially inaugurated despite undergoing important alterations in its interior until 1910, such as the acquisition of new turbo-alternators or the expansion of the boiler room, which involved building a new 36 meter-high chimney in the shape of an inverted pyramidal stem.

From its construction up to 1912, the Junqueira Power Station acquired new machinery to increase its production. In 1908 it started off with two alternators from the Boavista Power Station, each with a 1 MW output, and six Delaunay – Belleville boilers. The 1910 expansion involved the installation of three new Brown Boveri & Cª. turbo-alternators that raised the total output to 7.75 MW, as well as four boilers at a first stage, later joined by five more boilers with greater vaporisation capacity. Thus, in 1912, when all this equipment was in place, the original Tejo Power Station had fifteen small Belleville boilers and five generating sets that supplied the city of Lisbon's electric grid.

Regarding the exterior, the building that accommodated this extensive set of machinery displayed an architectural style typical of the small power stations at the end of the 19th century, the then called "electricity factories". Its plan was of a longitudinal nave covered on two sides, and three transversally adjacent pavilions on the western side. Between them, two slim chimneys doubled the height of the plant's body and "overlooked" the area. The north–south facades displayed the inscription 1909 / Cªs Reunidas Gás e Electricidade / Estação Eléctrica Central Tejo (United Gas and Electric Companies / Tejo Electric Power Station).

This original Tejo Power Station was planned to operate for six years (1908–1914) until the CRGE managed the necessary means to build a larger plant with greater capacity. However, due to the outbreak of World War I in that final year, the Tejo Power Station's original phase was extended and remained operational until 1921. The production and distribution of electricity began to take place under very precarious conditions since, among other aspects, the fuels used were of poor quality, and as a consequence the boilers suffered constant breakdowns, which led to a significant reduction in the rate of expansion and development of electricity in the city.

Despite these setbacks, construction work on the low pressure boiler building continued, and at the end of 1916 the plant started receiving steam from the first two low pressure boilers installed in the new building that was still under construction but nonetheless guaranteed the necessary conditions to reinforce the supply to the existing generating sets.

In 1921, once the Low Pressure building was constructed and made fully operational, the original Tejo Power Station was deactivated and dismantled, with a set of workshops and warehouses taking its place. Some years later, in 1938, the need to build a new High Pressure boiler building led to the demolition of the naves from the station's original phase, leaving no trace behind.

== The current Tejo Power Station ==
The need to build a new power station to satisfy the growing demand for electricity, and the precarious conditions under which the original Tejo Power Station was operating, led in 1914 to the construction of new buildings and the installation of more efficient machinery. This was a time of growth and modernisation that only ended with the installation of the 15th and final boiler in 1951.

Generally speaking, there were two main construction periods:

- The first, from 1914 to 1930, involved the Low Pressure facility and consisted of building and expanding the low pressure boiler room and the machinery room.
- The second took place between 1938 and 1951, and involved setting up High Pressure production. From the end of this period to this day, the architectural ensemble has remained unaltered, with the high pressure boiler building standing out from the rest of the complex.

=== Low Pressure ===
With the construction of the low pressure boiler building and the new machinery room, the Tejo Power Station began to consolidate itself both in terms of production and on an architectural level, with the use of brick on the visible facades of the entire industrial complex.

Once again, it is possible to separate this low pressure period into three construction phases:

- The first, from 1914 to 1921, included beginning construction of the boiler building, the coal distributor and the machinery room.
- The second phase lasted from 1924 to 1928. It stands out from the first expansion due to the construction of a manufacturing body to house the new boilers and another coal distributor, identical to the existing ones, a new generating set and the docks to the cooling system and its respective channels.
- Finally, the third phase, which took place between 1928 and 1930, involved expansion of the machinery room and the final expansion of the boiler room, due to the purchase of furnaces that were larger than the previous ones.

==== The First Phase (1914-1921) ====
Construction on the low pressure and machinery buildings began in 1914. The project included several manufacturing bodies: two longitudinal naves covered on both sides, each one to accommodate six Babcock & Wilcox low pressure boilers; one machinery room with a capacity for two German AEG 8MW turbo-alternators; as well as a smaller control and substation building. Construction began from north to south and east to west, and aside from the above, the possibility of later expanding on the southern side to the edge of the Tagus river was also immediately plotted.

Shortly after beginning the construction work, World War I broke out, causing delays in established deadlines and problems receiving the two turbo-alternators ordered from Germany, which remained detained until the end of the conflict. Nonetheless, in 1916 the first two low pressure boilers were installed (which in the project were assigned numbers 5 and 6) in order to supply the generators from the original power station.

During the two years that followed, two new boilers were installed (numbers 3 and 4) which, along with 5 and 6, exceeded the output that the old generators from the original Tejo Power Station could withstand. The CRGE concluded that it was necessary that another turbo-alternator be purchased to add to the two generators ordered years before from the German supplier and which were still held up, thus moving forward with the construction of one part of the machinery room to accommodate this new generator. In 1919, the new Swiss Escher Wyss & Cie 7500 kW turbo-alternator began operating.

The next year, the remaining boilers (numbers 1 and 2) were installed, and with the war over, the two German AEG sets were finally received, beginning operation in 1921. With the permanent installation of these 6 boilers and three generating sets, production stabilised and it was possible to dismantle the outdated equipment from the Junqueira Power Station.

==== Second Phase (1924-1928) ====
Gradually, due to the increase in consumption, it was once again necessary to carry out new and important work on the power station in order to expand and complete the low pressure boiler room. The program created by the CRGE consisted in expanding one industrial nave that would accommodate three new low pressure boilers and purchasing one new generating set.

Thus, throughout 1922 a study was conducted regarding the installation of boilers number 7 and 9, and the possibility of these operating with pulverised coal, which ended up proving unsuccessful, since in boiler number 6 the tests carried out to implement this process produced unsatisfactory results. Nonetheless, pulverised coal would still be used in boiler number 11.

The "new boiler room", as it was called, grew southward, toward the Tagus River, with the facade facing the river and remaining unfinished, temporarily closed off with a sheet of zinc and a metallic structure imitating the bay windows on the opposite side. This because a third and final expansion was anticipated for this low pressure boiler room. Boilers 7 and 9, both Babcock & Wilcox, were the first to be installed in this new space in 1924 and 1925 respectively. The third, boiler 11 – a Humboldt – was installed in 1928; since it used pulverised coal, it had its own coal mill.

The machinery room didn't undergo any change in size but inside, an 8MW generating set – number 4, a Stal-Asea – was installed in 1925. The channels and two siphons on the cooling system's new docks were also built, which carried water from the river to the power station's interior.

==== Third Phase (1928-1930) ====
It was in the third building phase of the Tejo Power Station's first period that construction on the industrial naves was completed, both on the boiler rooms and machinery room. In 1928, the same year boiler 11 was installed, it was decided to go ahead with the purchase of the final two low pressure boilers, numbers 8 and 10, from the most frequent supplier, Babcock & Wilcox, due to the delays on the installation of the Humboldt boiler. However, their permanent installation was only concluded at the end of 1930.

The new manufacturing body that accommodated them maintained the same aesthetic lines as the previous structures, although with greater dimensions. For this, the temporary zinc sheet facade was removed and the building was built toward the river, acquiring the facade that remains today.

Regarding the machinery room, it was also necessary to pull down the existing southern facade in order to expand the plant's area toward the river, thus aligning it with the boiler room in order to allow the installation of the new and final Escher Wyss/Thompson generating set (which, following the sequence used until then, was assigned the number 5), as well as creating a space on the lower floor for unloading and managing turbines, alternators and other material. The reinforcement of the machinery's capacity also implied the expansion of the cooling water channelling facility, leading to the construction of two new siphons, one for water intake and another for elimination, thereby bringing the total to four siphons.

After approximately fifteen years undergoing construction and expansion, in its Low Pressure phase, the Tejo Power Station finally had three large manufacturing areas: boilers, machinery and substation, located parallel to the river. The boiler room consisted of four large industrial naves that created a free space in the interior for housing eleven low pressure boilers, ten Babcock & Wilcox (British technology) and one Humboldt (German origin). The machinery room is a longitudinal and also open space, perpendicular to the boiler room, accommodating five generating sets of varying capacities and brands: Escher Wyss & Cie, AEG, Stal-Asea and Escher Wyss/Thompson.

=== High Pressure ===
Despite having concentrated work on low pressure during the period between 1930 and 1938, a series of construction work was carried out in order to prepare the Tejo Power Station for future high pressure production, which implied constructing a new building.

The location chosen for this new building was plotted where the original Tejo Power Station still stood. Despite being made up of a combination of workshops and warehouses, before demolishing it, a new location had to be found to accommodate these roles that were complementary but indispensable to the plant's operation. Thus the decision was made to purchase the property and buildings where the old sugar refinery Senna Sugar Estates, Ltd. (owned by the "Companhia de Açúcar de Moçambique" - Mozambique Sugar Company¬) used to lie, located on the power station's east side.

From the beginning of that decade, AEG turbo-alternators 2 and 3 began to cause problems and break down constantly, and in 1934 a request was issued to purchase and license the installation of two generators of the same brand but with double the capacity. It was the end of 1935 when the new turbo-alternator number 2 was installed and inaugurated; it was also at this time that installation of the new voltage transformation equipment was concluded, allowing the Tejo Power Station's substation to supply the Lisbon and Tejo Valley region all the way to Santarém. At the end of the following year, generator number 3 was also replaced.

The installation of new generating sets with greater capacity made it almost mandatory to set up the first high pressure boilers (numbers 12, 13 and 14) in order to use the capacity provided by the turbo-alternator sets more efficiently due to the greater power the steam from the new boilers produced. The boilers were once again ordered from manufacturer Babcock & Wilcox, and their large size dictated the construction of the largest building in the industrial complex, the High Pressure Boiler Building.

In 1938, dismantled and without use, demolition began on what remained of the old original power plant to build in its place the new Tejo Power Station manufacturing space. Building was contracted out to several companies: for the coal mixer and increase in coal elevation, the Societé des Pieux Franki was selected, beginning work in September of that year. The metallic structure and construction work was given to Portuguese company Vulcano & Colares, beginning work on the first elements for the structure and the boilers in March 1939. What was noteworthy about this new building was that its structure was entirely built in iron, with the finishing following the same lines as the low pressure building, in other words, brick on the visible facades. The difference lay in the trimming, which contrary to the rest of the complex, presented a markedly classicist character of renaissance palace influence.

During the time in which the High Pressure building began to take shape, work was also taking place on a new building of much smaller proportions destined for the Low Pressure Auxiliary equipment; in other words, to accommodate the water purification and treatment machinery. This annex also served to free up space in the boiler room since an Auxiliary High Pressure room was to be built at a later date. The auxiliary low pressure facility was completed in 1939 and adjoined the main building, next to boilers 8 and 10.

Once again the war, this time World War II, caused delays in the assembly and installation of the high pressure building. The three boilers planned to begin operating in 1940 only began to work a year later when their facilities were finally in working condition; boiler 12 in March, boiler 13 the following month and boiler 14 in August 1941.

However, the boilers couldn't reach a high output because they were operating under low pressure; the High Pressure auxiliary equipment had to be built and the turbines adapted. The auxiliary building grew within the low pressure boiler room, making it necessary to dismantle boilers 1 and 2 in 1943. On the other hand, making the turbines in sets 2 and 3 compatible with a high pressure process was complicated, since the order placed with the German manufacturer encountered the commercial blockade that spread all over the European continent as a consequence of World War II. The equipment finally arrived in 1942, allowing High Pressure electric power production to begin the following year. In 1943, boilers 12 and 13 began to supply turbo-alternator number 2, and in 1944, boiler 14 began supplying turbo-alternator 3.

Because of the war, during the years of conflict the price of coal increased progressively while its quality dropped. Consequently, the rise in prices quadrupled in only six years (between 1939 and 1945). On the other hand, electricity production also rose progressively, reaching maximum rates year after year, peaking in 1950 at a record rate of 52 200 kW and 216 million kWh produced.

In 1948, due to the escalating price of coal, the three high pressure boilers were slightly altered to adapt them to burn naphtha (fuel oil), a petroleum by-product that at the time was cheaper than coal. It was also necessary to build an 8 000m3 reservoir near the Praça de Carvão (Coal Square) to store this flammable liquid.

==== Boiler 15 ====
Throughout the year of 1944, the CRGE made plans to replace the old alternators and boilers with equipment better suited to the reality of those times, a consequence of technological evolution. Later, and due to the increase in electricity consumption, that project evolved into an expansion plan to create a new production centre, in other words, a new thermoelectric power station. That same year the National Electrification Law was approved, indicating a turning point in Portuguese electric power policy, making hydroelectric systems an absolute priority for power production. This meant that a project for a new thermoelectric power station would be denied, since it opposed the law. After making several appeals to the government, in 1948 the CRGE were finally granted permission to proceed with a minimal expansion of the Tejo Power Station, which meant the acquisition and installation of a new boiler, boiler number 15.

Once again supplied by Babcock & Wilcox, it was installed beside boiler 12. In order to accomplish this, the existing facade had to be demolished, the new area cemented, and the metallic structure covered in brick built, always with the same technique and look. Construction work began at the beginning of 1950 and the boiler began operating when construction was concluded in mid-1951, a time when the power station was already acting as a reserve.

The almost ten-year difference between the installation of the first high pressure boilers and this final one results in differences between them. For instance, boiler 15 already came equipped with naphtha injectors (in the others, these were added progressively), the conveyor belt is lower, the control table is more advanced in registering and reading the boiler's operational data, the boiler dust (ash) pan has six coal hoppers to expel boiler dust and coal (in the other there were only three), and it is also slightly larger in size.

=== Integration into the National Electric Grid ===
The National Electrification Law made producing hydroelectric power an absolute priority, as was standardising electricity in the country through a national transport network. For those reasons, since 1950 the Tejo Power Station was classified as a reserve power station, occupying a secondary position to support the electric power production sector, inevitably beginning its decline.

Indeed, on 21 January 1951 the Castelo do Bode Power Station was officially inaugurated, the first of several large scale hydroelectric power plants that the National Electrification Law established in its project to supply electric power to the large consumption centres, such as Lisbon and Porto. From that moment on, the Tejo Power Station became a reserve plant, limiting its operation to years of drought or complicated water situations, and as a support system for the national electric grid. However, it continued to produce power, although operating only one turbo set and two high pressure boilers.

From 1951 to 1968, it worked every year except in 1961. 1953 was an especially difficult year due to a lack of water supply, which meant the Tejo Power Station had to work for almost the entire year, often overburdened in order to satisfy demand not only from its own distribution network but also to support the national grid. It was also during the 1960s that all the low pressure equipment was shut down and dismantled.

The last record of the power station's operation dates 14 August 1972, and is related to the movement opposing the political regime in government at the time. On 9 August, the high voltage lines that supplied Lisbon with electricity were sabotaged and the city was left without power. The Tejo Power Station was called upon for one week to overcome the problem and produce electricity to supply Lisbon's distribution network. The power station's former workers that had been summoned, some already retired, with all their knowledge and experience, got the Tejo Power Station working once again, feeding coal into boiler number 15 for the last time. 1 200 678 kWh were produced, a residual value that only represented one fifth of the daily consumption demands on the CRGE grid. That is the record that marks the final day of the Tejo Power Station. The noise and vibrations that characterised the operation of this power plant for several generations, were permanently stilled.

Officially, the Tejo Power Station was shut down and declassified in 1975.

== The Electricity Museum ==
After nationalising the Portuguese electricity sector in 1975, the CRGE's assets were integrated into the new company established in 1976, EDP – Electricidade de Portugal, and the question arose regarding what to do with the old Tejo Power Station, where there was still a large amount of machinery tied to the impressive structure. The proposal was clear: reopen the space as a science and industrial archaeology museum.

In the same year the site was declared an Asset of Public Interest, in 1986, the future Electricity Museum's founding team got to work, opening its doors to the general public for the first time in 1990. The Museum's permanent exhibits tell the story of the Tejo Power Station's process, history and work, as well as relevant aspects in the evolution of electric power production, from the first discoveries to current new forms of producing electricity. The Museum also has a Documentation Centre, a specialised library and a research and conservation service pertaining to a great variety of electricity-related equipment, thus consolidating the historic study of electricity in Portugal and perpetuating its memories and facts.

Between 2001 and 2005, as a response to its declining state of conservation, the power station underwent restoration work. Its facades and interiors were cleaned, its iron structure reinforced, thousands of bricks were replaced and the museographic content was altered, as is visible today and can be confirmed by visiting the space, the old Tejo Power Station, now an Electricity Museum.

== See also ==
- Tejo Power Station
- Electricity Museum (Lisbon)
