= Tejo Power Station operations =

Former thermoelectric power station in Lisbon, Portugal

Tejo Power Station seen from the Tagus River.

The Tejo Power Station was a thermoelectric power station in operation from 1908 to 1975, in the Belém district of Lisbon, Portugal.

== Operations ==
The basic operation of a thermoelectric power station is quite simple: burning fuel to release heat that transforms water from a liquid state into steam. The steam is then responsible for driving a turbine activating the machine that generates electric power.

However, the aspects involved in electric power production in the old Tejo Power Station weren't that simple because, among other things, a large and complex internal air and water system was required, as well as treating fossil fuels, which in the old power station's case was coal.

=== Coal ===
Boats loaded with coal coming in the most part from Great Britain arrived along the Tagus River and docked at the power station. Using narrow planks connecting the boats to the dock, workers would unload the coal, placing it in several piles in Praça do Carvão (Coal Square). It was here that the Tejo Power Station's entire electricity production process began.

Transporting coal to the boilers’ feed system was performed manually by pushing trolleys from the coal piles to the sieve and crusher. Afterwards it was placed in bucket elevators which raised it to the mixing silos that stored the various types of coal, creating a balanced mixture for good combustion in the boiler.

Once mixed, the coal would continue up on another system of bucket elevators to the coal distribution conveyor belt that ran along the top of the boiler building. From this conveyor, the coal would fall into the loaders and from there was directed through downspouts to the rotating grate conveyor inside the boiler, where it burned slowly, producing a temperature inside the boiler of approximately 1200°C.

=== Boiler Circuits ===
The boiler is fundamentally made up of 3 circuits: water/steam, air/smoke and boiler dust (ash). Each circuit’s function is indispensable and complementary to the others. The water/steam circuit’s function was to transform the liquid water into steam; the air/smoke circuit was of great importance, since the better or worse use of the circuit was reflected in the variation in the boiler’s output; and finally, the ash circuit, from where unburned coal and ash resulting from the boiler’s combustion were recovered.

The water necessary to produce steam was treated and circulated in a closed circuit, entering the boiler through the economiser located at the top, and from here passed on to the steam drum located on top of the boiler, which functioned as a water and steam reservoir, serving as a connection between the two circuits. From the steam drum, water came down the “Bailey walls”, in other words, the walls located on the inside of the boiler's furnace, designed to hold the heat inside and built in cast iron with numerous vertical tubes along which the water circulated while it vaporised. This mixture of steam and water rose once again to the steam drum and the steam was directed to the superheater, a set of tubes also located inside the furnace, which allowed the wet steam to transform into dry steam, thus obtaining great pressure (38 kg/cm^{2} and 450 °C at the moment of high pressure), thereby gathering the necessary conditions to travel to the turbines in the machinery room.

As with water and steam, air was also necessary to burn coal. The larger part of this circuit was located at the top of the boiler to make the most of the maximum temperature of the air coming out at the top, collecting it using a primary ventilator that sent it to the heater and, from there, to the secondary ventilator which directed it toward the grate conveyor to fan the flames. On the other hand, the smoke created by the burning fuel was drawn out by the smoke exhaust fans which sent the smoke outside through the chimneys. However, before that, the heat from the smoke was reused to fan the flames and the smoke was filtered in order to reduce emissions.

The final circuit, dealing with ash, was located under the boiler. Each boiler had 3 deposits in the shape of an inverted pyramid (hopper), aimed to recover the unburned coal, partly burned coal and coal ash. The deposit located under the downspouts, in other words, at the beginning of the grate conveyor, collected the pieces of coal that fell off the conveyor during distribution. The deposit located in the middle collected partly burned coal that had fallen off the conveyor due to the boiler's vibrations. The coal recovered from these deposits was sent to Praça do Carvão, back to the boilers’ feed system to be reused. Finally, the third deposit located at the end of the grate conveyor collected the coal ash and consisted of a crusher with water injection to cool and soften the ash. The ash was then carried in trolleys to the outside and deposited in a silo called the “ash skip”, located in Praça de Carvão.

=== Water treatment ===
The water carried to the boiler was totally pure and circulated in a closed circuit. Contrary to what one might think, the power station did not use the river water for vaporisation, but water from the urban water network (including a well on the plant's premises). Firstly, it was stored in the water tower – a large reservoir located on the roof of the high pressure boiler building – and was then treated in the Water Room, where three main functions were carried out: water treatment, pre-heating and pumping.

The treatment was of utmost importance since the water's own impurities and excess oxygen could perforate the tubing/turbines and oxidise the tubes, adding to the incrustation and accumulation of small particles in the iron and steel, thereby corroding the equipment and reducing its performance. This is why all the water arriving at the power station was analysed in a lab and then submitted to a complete treatment that involved purification, filtering, chemical correction etc., before entering the circuit in the form of pure H_{2}O.

After this treatment, the water had to be pre-heated before moving on to the boilers in order to increase the combustion’s thermal output. For this, the steam recovered from the turbines was used inside the heating tanks, thereby provoking a thermal exchange and obtaining a temperature of 130°C. At this temperature, the only thing that remained was to get the water to a certain pressure before directing it to the boilers. The set of pumps in the Water Room guaranteed it would travel, since it placed the water at a pressure of 52kg/cm2, enough to overcome the opposing pressure in the boilers’ steam drums.

=== Turbo-alternators ===
The steam produced in the boilers travelled at great pressure (38 kg/cm^{2}) to the turbo-alternator sets, which transformed the steam's thermal energy into mechanical energy through the turbine, which in turn transformed it into electric energy upon exiting the alternator. The generating sets were composed of a turbine and an alternator, thus the name turbo-alternator. The turbine had eight wheels with two crowns with blades, and the other seven only one crown. The steam coming from the boilers entered the turbine's distribution box through the admission valve. From the box, with the aperture controlled by the nozzles’ valves and by undergoing the Venturi effect, the steam entered the first wheel with a high enough flow rate to get the turbine to 3000 rpm. The steam's pressure gradually decreased in the next wheels until it equalled the condenser's pressure, although its exchange speed remained constant.

All of this drove the wheels of the turbine, which then, through a gear, made the alternator turn, which produced electric power to distribute to consumers and to be used by the power station's own electric equipment. The star-wound alternator produced a triphasic current of 10.500V with a frequency of 50 cycles per second (cps). The alternator's excitation current was supplied by the exciter, a continuous current generator joined directly to the general base that, at full charge, had 170 Volts CC with a 340 Amp intensity.

The power produced by each alternator was carried to the outgoing breakers. Each breaker, or line, was directed toward the substation and from there supplied numerous customers. The first breaker had a 10kV capacity installed in the substation that supplied Lisbon’s electric grid and two more breakers, one with 3.3 kV and another with a 30 kV capacity. Of these two breakers, the first and oldest, aside from supplying power to the consumer grid, also powered the Tejo Power Station’s auxiliary services. Two cables set out from the second breaker with a 30 kV capacity; one to Marvila and continuing on to Vila Franca de Xira, and the other directly to the city of Santarém, to supply the industrial clientele situated along the Tejo Valley.

=== Condensers ===
After fulfilling its role of powering the turbine’s wheels, the steam was directed to the condensers where it returned to its liquid state, allowing that water to be reused in the boilers. The steam entered the condenser and, through contact with the tubular system which was filled with cold water, turned back into its liquid state. This cooling water was harvested from the Tagus River through three ingoing pipelines and one outgoing pipeline that forced the water into the channels through a siphoning effect. The river water never mixed with the pure water used in the boilers, since, as has already been mentioned, the Tejo’s water circulated in a tubular system inside the condensers, while the steam travelled in free space.

The water resulting from this condensation of steam was suctioned by the extraction pumps and sent once again to the boilers’ steam drums, passing first through the water heaters, feed tanks and pumps, and finally to the economiser. Recovery of the condensed steam for reuse as water to feed the boiler closes the water/steam cycle in a thermoelectric station, and as such, the Tejo Power Station was no exception.

== See also ==
- Tejo Power Station topics
- Thermal power station
- Electricity Museum (Lisbon)
