= Working conditions at the Tejo Power Station =

Tejo Power Station seen from the Tagus River (Rio Tejo).

The entire operation of the Tejo Power Station, as well as the evolution of electricity in the city of Lisbon, was only possible thanks to the work carried out by the people who set all of the machinery in motion, day and night, guaranteeing that the coal-fired power station never interrupted its production.

== Introduction ==
Since the city's consumption of electric power never stops, the boilers could never be idle. Thus it was necessary to create a twenty-four-hour work regime at the Tejo Power Station, with three rotational shifts; from 12am to 8am; from 8am to 4pm; and from 4pm to 12am. Due to the constant increases in the power station's output and size, it became crucial to hire more workers, especially during war times. In the 1940s, there were approximately 550 workers on the payroll, from the more specialised staff to those with the simplest but more difficult tasks, the latter being in greater number.

== Division of labour ==
The Tejo Power Station is a highly complex industrial body, and the number of workers it required demanded a hierarchical labour structure subdivided by room, with the harder work coexisting beside the more bearable tasks. Needless to say, those who worked near the boiler suffered more than those who, for example, controlled it from the control desk.

There were approximately 45 types of jobs in the power station, ranging from work in the plant such as that done by the ‘Alcochetanos’ or the stokers, to work done in the workshops and the electricians in the substation.

Work areas in the power station:

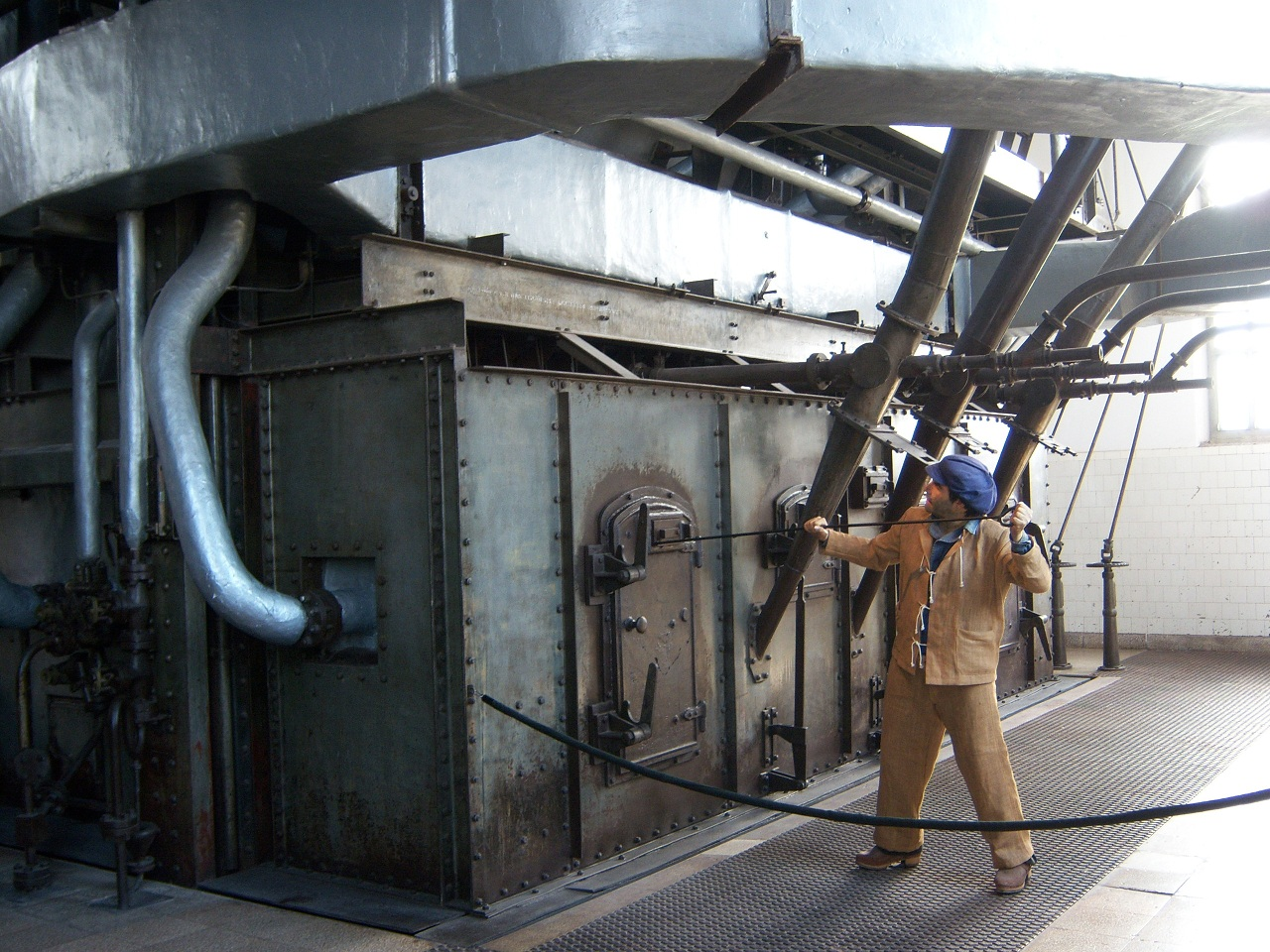
Mannequin of operator shovelling coal inside a high pressure boiler.

- Praça do Carvão (Coal Square): This is where the workers who unloaded and distributed the coal were found. The Alcochetanos, responsible for unloading the coal from the boat to the square, were hired periodically for this job. Their name was due to them being men and women from Alcochete, a town located on the other side of the Tagus River. They would unload the coal, carry it and pile it according to its country of origin.

In the square, the power station workers called the ‘Square’s Men’ distributed the coal, ensuring that it reached the boilers’ feed system. On a regular workday, there would be approximately 16 people on each shift, including foremen, machinery maintenance men and those who controlled the bucket elevators and the scale.

- Boiler Room: this is the room that required the greatest number of workers in the entire power station: ninety people between 8am and 5pm, and thirty people for the rest of the workday. Here, each job was crucial to the successful operation of the boilers.

One chief engineer supervised the boilers with two men directly under him. To control the boilers, there was the head operator who, from the control desks, controlled steam production, while the sub-head operator gave instructions from the top of the boiler. Regarding the coal burning, the operator controlled the combustion quality, while the stoker, from behind the boiler, pushed the unburnt coal to be re-burned, thereby clearing the combustion conveyor belt.

- Ash Room: The workers responsible for removing the coal ash were located in the room beneath the boiler room. Their job was to take the ash from the silos and deposit it outside the power station.
- Machinery and auxiliary room: This is where all of the power station's more qualified personnel were found since, and without underestimating the workers who suffered most, there is a huge difference between setting a boiler in motion and controlling the turbo-alternator sets, the electric power generators and all the auxiliary equipment. Approximately 15 people worked here during the day, from technical engineers, machinists and the staff responsible for the water purification process, to cleaning and maintenance personnel.

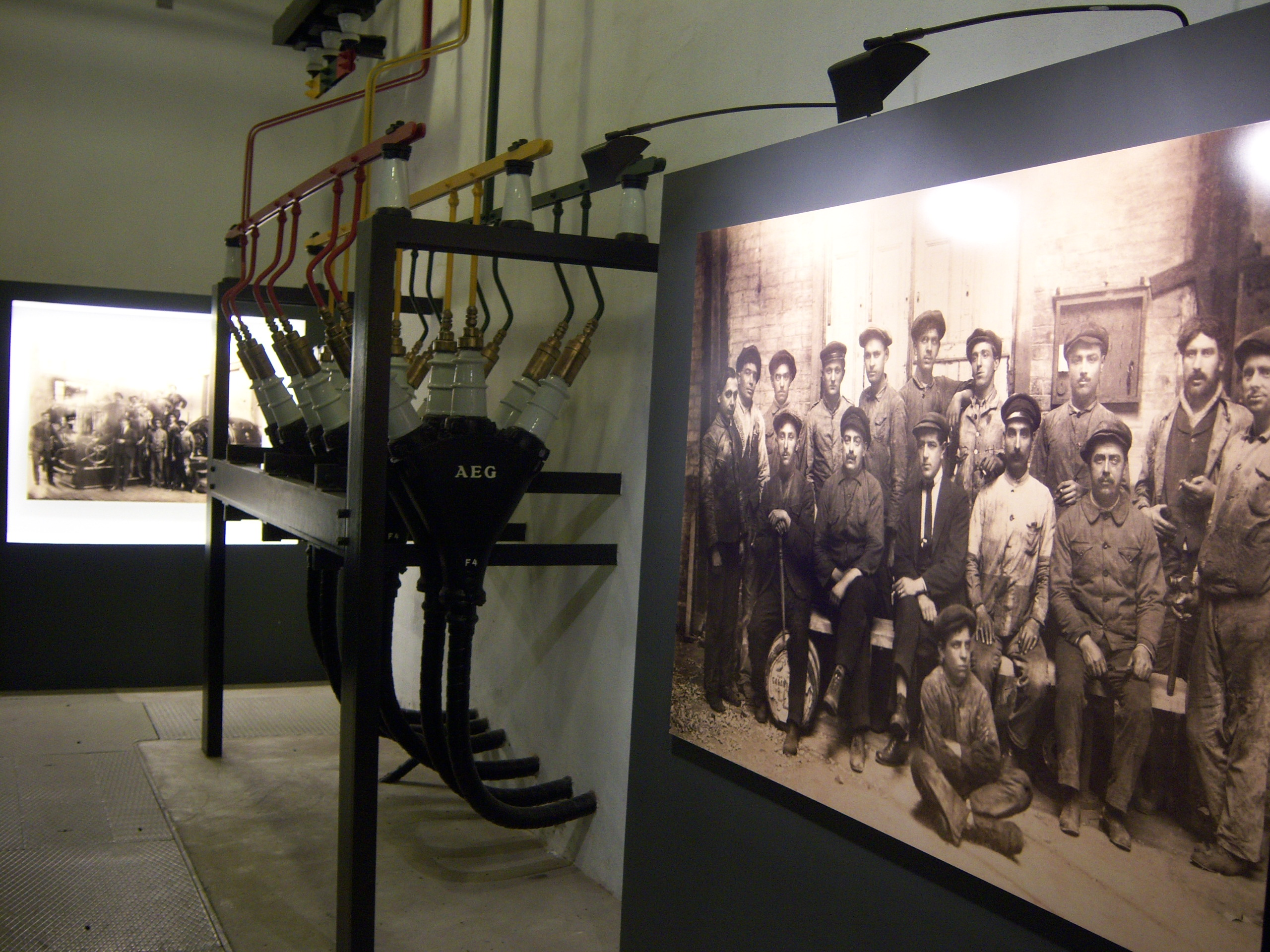
Condenser Room with the circuit breakers & museum exhibits.

- Substation: This is where the electricians in charge of the substation and its electrical equipment–such as transformers and circuit-breakers, etc.–worked.
- Some of the activities that complemented production must also be brought to notice, such as the laboratory, workshops, the design room and warehouses. In the Electricity workshop, maintenance was carried out on all of the power station's electrical infrastructures. In the carpentry and ironwork workshops, workers made molds, furniture and a wide variety of parts for the power station's operation. In this work space, the workday began at 8am and ran until 5pm, and involved approximately 50 people.
- There was also security work (four people per shift), and staff in charge of administrative processes.

== Working Conditions ==
The Tejo Power Station's working conditions (as in any thermoelectric power station at the time) were in fact not easy: the work was very hard, which meant a poor quality of life for the workers. The worst jobs in the power station were unloading coal, working near the boiler, collecting ash, and cleaning the refrigeration channels and ash pans.

The operators were located near the boilers and were in charge of supervising and controlling the coal levels on the combustion conveyor belt by opening or moving the silos, ensuring a regular distribution of coal and moving the combustion conveyor at a faster or slower pace. The stokers were situated at the back of the boiler, pushing the unburnt coal back to the middle of the combustion belt. This was an extremely arduous job, one of the worst in the power station, since they had to endure the intense heat of the entire room, facing an opening in the furnace that brought the heat to extreme levels, constantly breathing the coal combustion by-products, such as smoke and boiler slag.

But worse still was the work carried out on the floor beneath the boilers, in the ash section. Collecting ash is the most gruelling job of all, carried out in an environment where the temperatures in the power station reached the highest, filled with fumes and red-hot boiler slag and ash that had to be collected, often manually, and taken to the Praça do Carvão in trolleys to be unloaded in the Ash Skip. Taking the ash outside made these people's working conditions even worse due to the difference in temperatures inside and outside the power station.

These three jobs are often locally recognized because the work, effort and often life-threatening risks made it possible to produce electric power that the workers themselves never had the chance to enjoy. Thanks to them and all of the other workers, it was possible to bring power to Lisbon’s factories and to the higher classes in the city’s more affluent neighbourhoods.

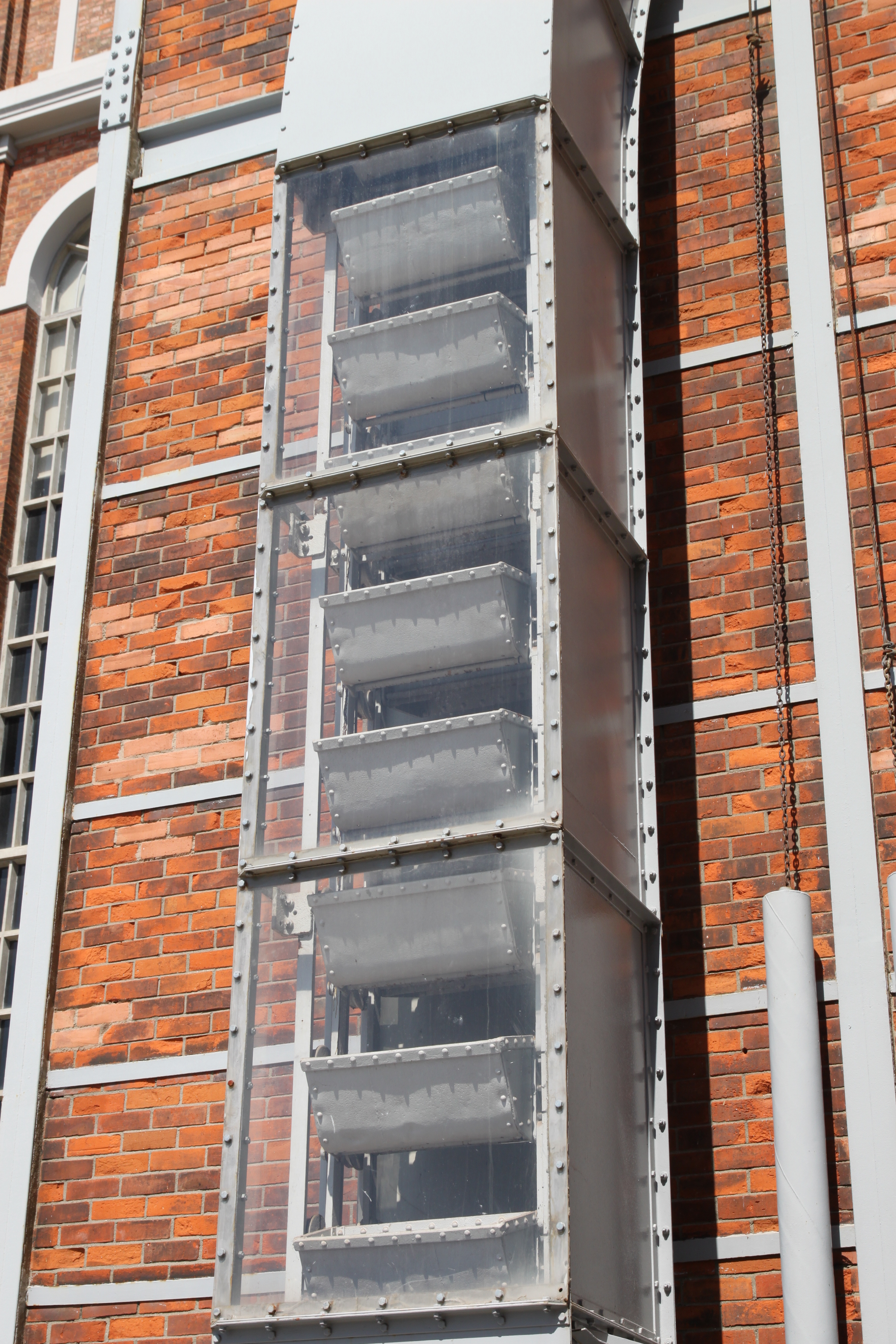
Coal elevator system.

== Social Aspects ==
The Companhias Reunidas de Gás e Electricidade (CRGE – 'United Gas and Electric Companies') implemented a social policy for their workers, since this was one of the largest companies in Portugal, employing thousands of workers all over the country.

CRGE social−worker support projects in Lisbon included:

- Building the Camarão da Ajuda public housing development in the late 1940s.
- Setting up schools for both the workers’ children and the workers themselves, with classes for the children and technical and literacy training for the adults.
- Setting up health clinics for the workers and their families.

== See also ==
- Tejo Power Station topics
- Museu da Electricidade
