= Sandrine Dixson-Declève =

Energy policy expert and government official

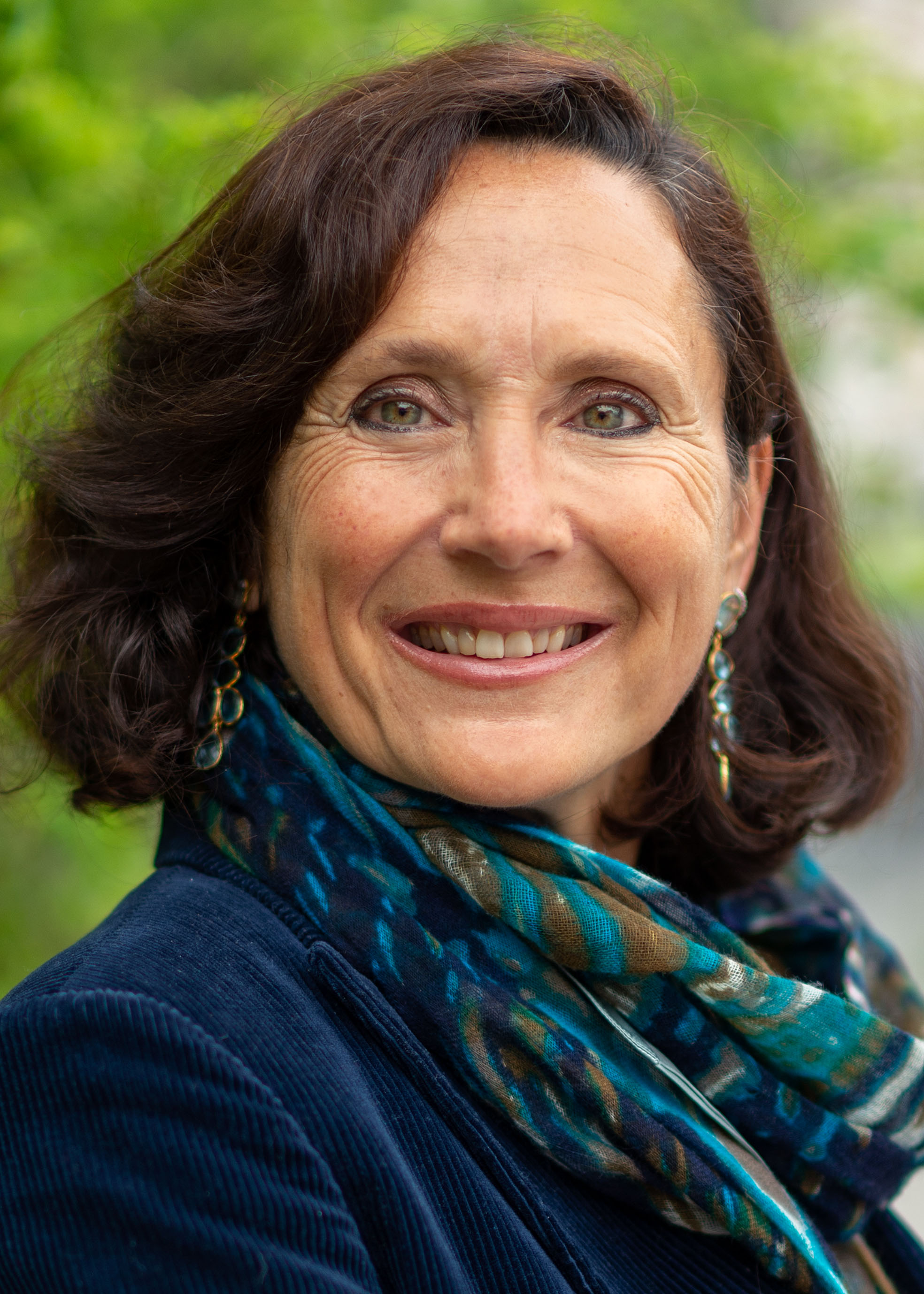
Sandrine Dixson-Declève

Sandrine Dixson-Declève is an international climate change, sustainable development, sustainable finance and systems transformation thought leader. She served as President of the Club of Rome from 2018 to 2024, together with Mamphela Ramphele becoming one of the first women to lead the organization in its history. She currently serves as Honorary President to the Club of Rome and Executive Chair of Earth4All and is the co-founder and co-chair of the System Transformation Hub, launched in 2024...

Dixson-Declève is a TED Countdown and TedX speaker and author of numerous publications and book chapters including Earth for all – A survival guide to humanity, published in 2022.

She divides her time between lecturing, facilitating difficult conversations and advising policy and business leaders across the globe. Dixson-Declève has been recognised by GreenBiz as one of the 30 most influential women across the globe driving change in the low-carbon economy and promoting green business.

== Author, speaker and facilitator of difficult conversations ==
=== Policy-oriented publications for humanity’s wicked problems ===
Dixson-Declѐve was a driving force behind both the Planetary Emergency Plan 1:0 2:0. These reports, first published in 2018 provide a set of key policy levers to address the cross-cutting challenges of climate change, biodiversity loss and human health and wellbeing. The Plans have since been infused into international discussions on climate, biodiversity, sustainable development and global risks.

She has contributed to numerous reports providing policy recommendations on major global issues including A System Change Compass: Implementing the European Green Deal in a time of recovery, 21st Century Wellbeing Economics: The Road to Recovery, Renewal & Resilience and Anchoring Transformation: Policy Anchors for Ensuring a new European Social-Economic Paradigm.

=== TED Countdown and TedX: The Sustainable Future series ===
Dixson-Declѐve was a speaker in the TED Countdown and TEDX: The Sustainable Future series. In conversation with TED global curator Bruno Giussani, she presented "5 keys to shifting to a well-being economy - and the cost of inaction”, outlining what has been learned since the first "Limits to Growth" report warned of the consequences of unlimited economic growth and presenting Earth4All: an international initiative identifying the transformations needed to move to wellbeing economies, accelerate systems-change, and achieve greater wellbeing for all within planetary boundaries.

=== DLD Conference 2022 ===
At the DLD Conference 2022 she reflected on the prescience of the Club of Rome’s landmark report The Limits to Growth, fifty years after its publication. She outlined the need for transformational economics and systems change as humanity reaches environmental and social tipping points.

=== UN COP26 World Leaders Summit ===
Dixson-Declѐve chaired the UN COP26 World Leaders Summit ‘Action on Forests & Land Use’ event which brought together an alliance of governments, companies, financial actors, and non-state leaders to raise ambition on forests and land-use. Over 100 leaders pledged to end deforestation at this session.

=== Earth4All ===
Dixson-Declève co-authored "Earth for All – A Survival Guide for Humanity", published in 2022. The book brings together findings from economists, scientists and systems thinkers associated with the Earth4All initiative and the 21st Century Transformational Economics Commission. As part of the Earth4All initiative, the 21st Century Transformational Economics Commission, co-led by Dixson-Declѐve and Anders Wijkman, guided state-of-the-art computer modeling, to explore policies likely to deliver the most good for the majority of people. The book identifies five “turnarounds” designed to achieve wellbeing for all within planetary boundaries within a single generation. The book has since been translated into multiple languages.

=== Quel Monde Pour Demain ===
Dixson-Declѐve recently released a joint intergenerational book on the future, climate change and the risks that weigh on humanity:“Quel Monde Pour Demain”, Éditions Luc Pire.

== Education and career ==
She graduated from University of California, Davis with a Bachelor's degree in International Relations and French. She also holds a Master's degree in Environmental Sciences from the Université libre de Bruxelles.

She has spent her career bringing together business leaders, policy makers, academia and NGOs to unpack complex challenges.

=== The Club of Rome ===
In 2018 Dixson-Declѐve and Mamphela Ramphele were appointed as Co-presidents of the Club of Rome, the first women to lead the organization in its history. They were both re-elected for a second three-year term in 2021.

Dixson-Declѐve was Chief Partnership Officer for the UN Agency Sustainable Energy for All and prior to that was Director of the Prince of Wales’s Corporate Leaders Group and the EU office of the Cambridge Institute for Sustainability Leadership (2009-2016). During this period she was also appointed as Executive Director of the Green Growth Platform bringing together EU Ministers and CEOs. She was Executive Director of Hart Energy Consulting’s International Sustainable Energy Exchange (ISEE).

Dixson-Declѐve has worked with chemical and petro-chemical producers and the Finnish Environment Institute (FEI) on the European Commission’s MTBE Risk Assessment.

== Recognitions and advisory positions ==
Dixson-Declève serves as Executive Chair of Earth4All and co-founder and co-chair of the System Transformation Hub, launched in 2024. She sits on several boards and advisory boards including Climate KIC, UCB, BMW, the Eurazeo Planetary Boundaries Fund, the Leonardo Centre at Imperial College London, Skysun, Morphosis, Re-Imagine Europa and The Bridge. She is also a Climate Governance Commissioner, a Commissioner of the WHO Pan-European Commission on Climate and Health, an Ambassador for the Wellbeing Economy Alliance (WEAll), and a Fellow of the World Academy of Art and Science.

She teaches at the College of Europe in Bruges, Belgium, and is a Strategic Advisor, Senior Associate and faculty member of the Cambridge Institute for Sustainability Leadership(CISL). From 2019 to 2023, she chaired the European Commission Expert Group on the Economic and Societal Impact of Research and Innovation(ESIR). Dixson-Declève previously served on the board of the Portuguese utility company EDP and on the European Commission’s Sustainable Finance Platform and Sustainable Finance Taxonomy Expert Group.

Dixson-Declève has been recognised by GreenBiz as one of the 30 most influential women globally driving change in the low-carbon economy, by Reuters as one of 25 global female trailblazers, and by Forbes as one of the “Top 50 Women Over 50” leading on climate. In 2024, she received the Aenne Burda Award for Creative Leadership.

== Personal ==
Dixson-Declève is based in Belgium. She is married to Jeremy Dixson and has two daughters.

She is fluent in French and English and has a basic knowledge of Spanish.
