= Fântânele, Constanța =

Fântânele
- Commune
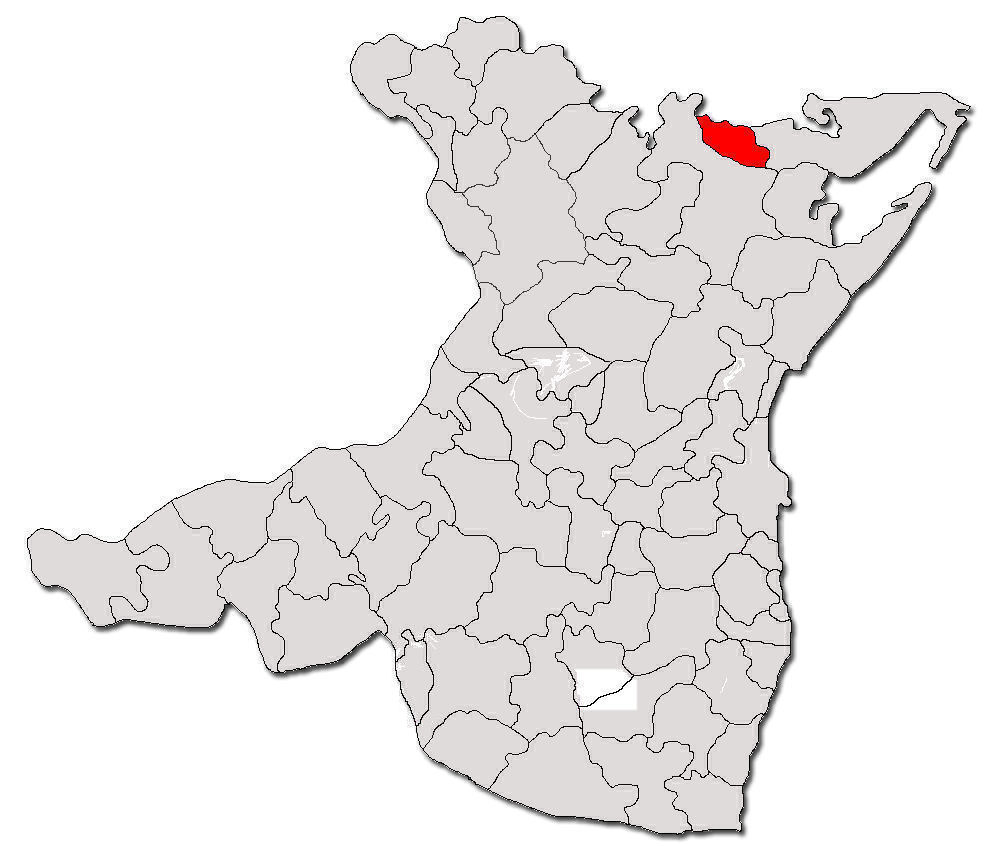
- Location in Constanța County

- Location in Romania
- Coordinates: 44°37′N 28°35′E
- Country: Romania
- County: Constanța

Government
  - Mayor (2020–2024): Ion-Adrian Roșu (PNL)
- Area: 42.00 km^{2} (16.22 sq mi)
- Population (2021-12-01): 1,368
  - Density: 32.57/km^{2} (84.36/sq mi)
- Time zone: UTC+02:00 (EET)
  - Summer (DST): UTC+03:00 (EEST)
- Vehicle reg.: CT
- Website: www.primariafantanelect.ro

Fântânele (Romanian pronunciation: [fɨntɨˈnele]); historical name: Inancișmea, Turkish: İnançeşme) is a commune in Constanța County, Northern Dobruja, Romania, including the village with the same name.

The commune was established in 2005 by detaching the Fântânele village from the Cogealac commune.

The Fântânele-Cogealac Wind Farm (with an installed nameplate capacity of 600 MW) is partly located on the territory of the commune.

== Demographics ==
At the 2011 census, Fântânele had 1,553 Romanians (99.94%), 1 others (0.06%).
