= EDP Sarichioi Wind Farm =

Wind farm in Romania

- Country: Romania
- Location: Sarichioi, Tulcea County
- Status: Approved
- Commission date: 2012
- Owner: Energias de Portugal

Power generation
- Units operational: 11
- Nameplate capacity: 33 MW

The EDP Sarichioi Wind Farm is a wind power project in Sarichioi, Tulcea County, Romania. It has 11 Vestas V90 wind turbines with a nominal output of around 3 MW which will deliver up to 33 MW of power, enough to power over 21,500 homes, with a capital investment required of approximately US$50 million.
