= Cogealac =

- Commune
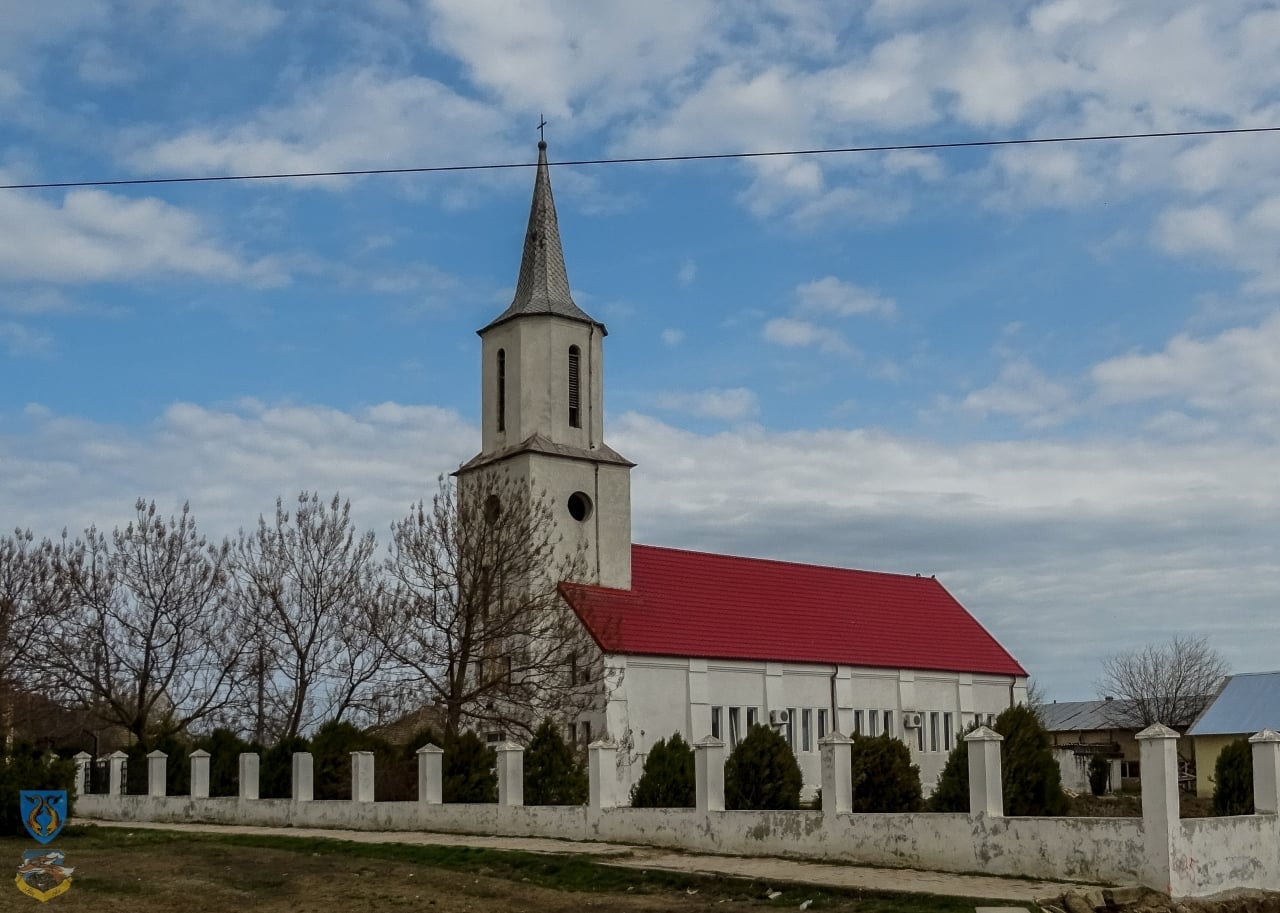
- Saint Basil the Great Church in Cogealac

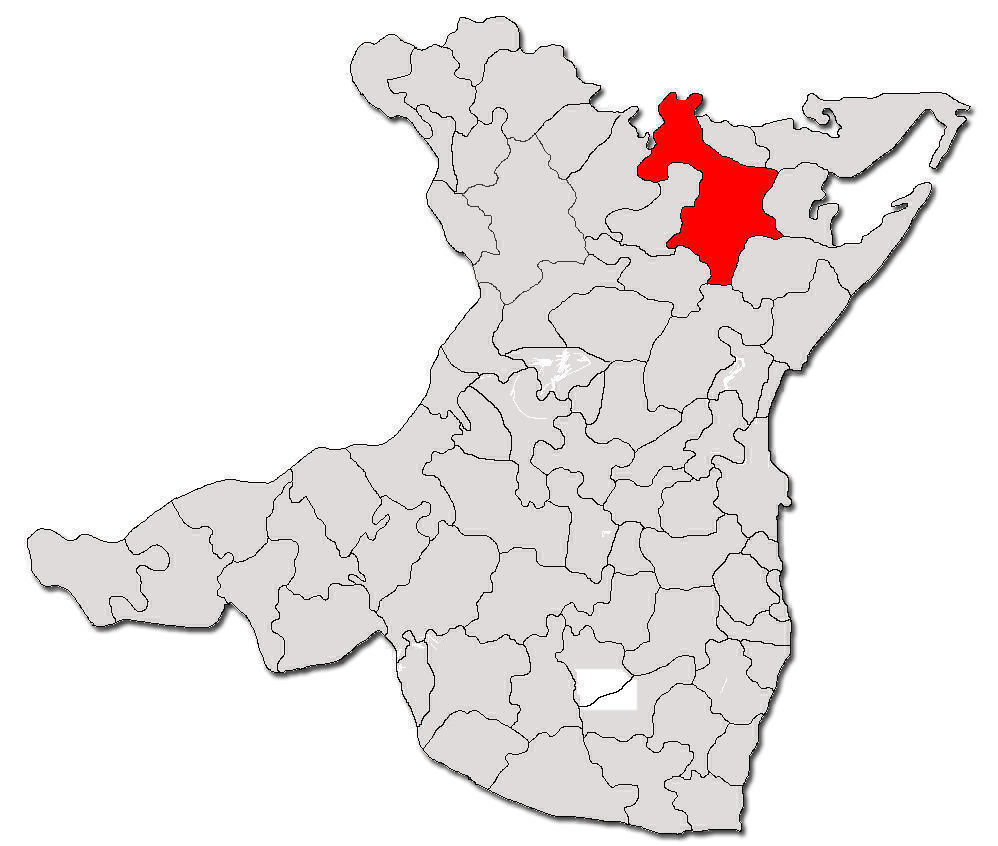
- Location in Constanța County

- Location in Romania
- Coordinates: 44°33′N 28°34′E
- Country: Romania
- County: Constanța
- Subdivisions: Cogealac, Gura Dobrogei, Râmnicu de Jos, Râmnicu de Sus, Tariverde

Government
  - Mayor (2020–2024): Hristu Cati (PSD)
- Area: 238.25 km^{2} (91.99 sq mi)
- Elevation: 85 m (279 ft)
- Population (2021-12-01): 4,686
  - Density: 19.67/km^{2} (50.94/sq mi)
- Time zone: UTC+02:00 (EET)
  - Summer (DST): UTC+03:00 (EEST)
- Postal code: 907070
- Area code: +40 x41
- Vehicle reg.: CT
- Website: www.primariacogealac.ro

Cogealac (Romanian pronunciation: [kod͡ʒe̯aˈlak]) is a commune in Constanța County, Northern Dobruja, Romania.

The commune includes six villages:

- Cogealac (historical names: Domnești, Turkish: Kocalak)
- Gura Dobrogei (historical names: Câvârgic, Turkish: Kıvırcık)
- Râmnicu de Jos
- Râmnicu de Sus
- Tariverde (historical name: Dorotea)

The territory of the commune also includes the former village of Colelia (Turkish: Kuleli), at 44°36′10″N 28°24′39″E, disestablished by Presidential Decree in 1977. The former village was populated by Dobrujan Germans until 1942 and it is now the site of the Colilia Monastery.

The Fântânele-Cogealac Wind Farm (with an installed nameplate capacity of 600 MW) is partly located on the territory of the commune.

On 2 March 2022, while searching for a crashed MiG-21 LanceR in the area, an IAR 330 military transport helicopter crashed near Gura Dobrogei, killing 7 military personnel.

== Demographics ==
At the 2011 census, Cogealac had 4,466 Romanians (98.89%), 4 Turks (0.09%), 46 others (1.02%).

== Notable people ==
- Stoica Lascu (born 1951), historian
