= EDP Cernavodă Wind Farm =

Wind farm in Romania

- Country: Romania
- Location: Cernavodă, Constanța County
- Coordinates: 44°20′16.3″N 28°2′0.8″E
- Status: Operational
- Commission date: 2010
- Owner: Energias de Portugal

Wind farm
- Type: Onshore

Power generation
- Units operational: 46
- Nameplate capacity: 138 MW
- Annual net output: 1.6 GW·h

The EDP Cernavodă Wind Farm is located in Cernavodă, Constanța County, Romania. It has 46 individual wind turbines, each with a nominal output of around 3 MW, with a total capacity of 138 MW. This capacity is sufficient to power over 85,000 homes. The project, which involved a capital investment of approximately €200 million, was commissioned between 2010 and May 2011.

== Overview ==
It has 46 individual wind turbines with a nominal output of around 3 MW which delivers up to 138 MW of power, enough to power over 85,000 homes, which required a capital investment of approximately €200 million. The project was undertaken and commissioned between 2010 and May 2011. The substation control system is based on Hitachi Energy (formerly ABB) MicroSCADA Pro technology using LON and DNP protocol communication with field equipment and IEC104 with two dispatch centres situated in Porto, Portugal and Bucharest, Romania|. The control and protection system was designed and engineered by Spanish company GEDLux Sistemas de Control. The EDP Cernavodă Wind Farm is the sister project of the EDP Peştera Wind Farm, a 90 MW wind farm which is currently operating and located 10 kilometres (6.2 mi) east of the Cernavodă farm close to the Cernavodă Nuclear Power Plant and the Danube – Black Sea Canal.

The wind farm is owned by EDP Renováveis, the renewable energy branch of the Portuguese conglomerate Energias de Portugal.
