= Universal Master Control Station =

System that controls and retrieves data from subsea equipment on the ocean floor.

A typical Master Control Station

On the top-side facilities of offshore oil and gas platforms, the Master Control Station (MCS) is a dedicated system that controls and retrieves data from subsea equipment on the ocean floor. The MCS is supplied by the manufacturers of the subsea control modules (SCM), an MCS is required for each vendor. This can be a challenge in some scenarios.

Positioned between the distributed control system (DCS) on the platform and the subsea equipment, the MCS is critical to maintaining safe operating conditions, optimizing production across a field and effectively managing reserves. The complex automation systems enabling offshore production of oil & gas, particularly in deep water, have strong parallels to their on-shore, process plant applications. These systems, subsystems and instruments must interoperate in a seamless manner.

In 2008, Control Dynamics International of Houston, now a subsidiary of ENGlobal, was commissioned to develop an MCS that could communicate with and control subsea equipment from multiple vendors; dubbed the Universal Master Control Station (UMCS).

== Design considerations & objectives ==
The primary focus of the UMCS development program was to create a new standardised solution that used commercially available, off-the-shelf components. The graphics, control routines, and logic/communication functionality would be designed and implemented to provide operations a common-look control system interface. A standard interface (communication protocol) would establish a common communication link for the UMCS enabling concurrent data exchange to multiple subsea vendors.

Additional scope of this initiative included:

- Communication and control up to 100 Subsea Control Modules (SCM)
- Expandable in the field
- Based on commercially available, off-the-shelf hardware lowering the OPEX of the implementation
- Components replaceable without well shut-in
- Dual redundancy to alleviate a shut-in due to multiple points of failure
- Communications with subsea equipment based on a widely accepted standards
- Open architecture for integration with third-party subsystems

Standard OPC databases serve as the communication link to the Distributed Control System (DCS), Hydraulic Power Unit (HPU), and Electrical Power Unit (EPU). The UMCS will communicate with subsea control pods at the wellhead from multiple subsea equipment providers, without disrupting the subsea vendor's native communication protocol.

== Physical architecture & connectivity ==
Dual-Redundant Architecture of the UMCS

The UMCS has three main layers: HMI, logic/control and subsea communications to control pods on the ocean floor. Two complete and segregated channel networks simultaneously monitor data functions to and from each other, as well as between surface and subsea equipment. The UMCS uses OPC for communications with each subsea gateway. The subsea gateway consists of the SCM communication application and OPC Client. Each subsea vendor provides their own gateway, thereby preserving their traditional proprietary design and safeguards inherent in each system. This scheme alleviates the need for modifying any subsea vendor's communication link or SCM, but allows the design of the SCM to be evolved without affecting the UMCS. The UMCS enables multiple subsea vendors to connect to the same MCS via Ethernet.

== Software applications—the core of the UMCS ==
The UMCS utilizes a set of core graphic screens with a variety of control pop-ups, trending screens, diagnostics, and alarm handling. Screens can be quickly configured to project-specific requirements using any off-the-shelf human-machine interface (HMI) software. Custom programming is minimized and is replaced by HMI screen configuration, making the UMCS extensible and easier to maintain.

== Tangible value ==
The system is also designed to accommodate multiple wells, and integrate with the major distributed control systems (DCS) and subsea equipment types. The UMCS also offers a pre-engineered solution based on a standardized program block architecture and a common communication database via the Standard Interface, based on OPC.
