= Fântânele-Cogealac Wind Farm =

Wind farm in Romania

- Country: Romania
- Location: Fântânele / Cogealac
- Coordinates: 44°35′25″N 28°33′55″E
- Status: Operational
- Construction began: 2008
- Commission date: 2012
- Owner: CEZ Group

Wind farm
- Type: Onshore
- Hub height: 100 m (328 ft)
- Rotor diameter: 99 m (325 ft)
- Site area: 11 km^{2} (4 mi^{2})

Power generation
- Units operational: 240
- Make and model: General Electric: 2.5XL
- Nameplate capacity: 600 MW

External links
- Website: www.cez.cz/en/power-plants-and-environment/wind-power-plant/fantanele-cegealac-wind-park.html
- Commons: Related media on Commons

The Fântânele-Cogealac Wind Farm is the largest onshore wind farm in Romania, with installed nameplate capacity of 600 MW from 240 General Electric 2.5xl wind turbines. The wind farm has been built for the Czech ČEZ Group.

== History ==
The project was first envisioned by United States developer Continental Wind Partners, a renewable energy partnership backed by private equity fund Good Energies Investments with operations in several countries including Romania, Bulgaria, Poland, Australia and New Zealand. In 2008 Continental Wind Partners agreed to sell the 600 MW wind farm project to the Czech energy utility ČEZ Group.

Planning permission was granted in 2007 and construction began in September 2008, with the first turbine being erected by August 2009. The first stage of the project, the Fântânele farm, was finished in December 2010 with the erection of 139 turbines. The second phase of the project involved the construction of another 101 wind turbines erected in Cogealac and has a nominal power output of 252.5 MW and was completed in November 2012.

== Description ==
The wind farm occupies 1,100 hectares (2,700 acres) of open field, 600 hectares (1,500 acres) in Fântânele and 500 hectares (1,200 acres) in Cogealac communes. The wind farm is north of Constanţa, 17 kilometres (11 mi) west from the shore of the Black Sea.

The entire project required a capital investment of approximately €1.1 billion. Fântânele-Cogealac wind farm is the largest onshore wind farm in Europe surpassing the 539 MW Whitelee Wind Farm in Scotland, United Kingdom. The wind farm will account for 10% of the total green energy production in Romania at completion.

As the figures given above were published before the turbines had been operational for a full year they are projected rather than recorded figures. Wind speed is not constant, therefore, a wind farm's annual energy production never achieves the sum of the generator nameplate ratings multiplied by the total hours in a year. The ratio of actual productivity in a year to this theoretical maximum is called the capacity factor. Typical capacity factors are 20–40%, with values at the upper end of the range achieved on particularly favourable sites.

== Construction ==
The wind farm was constructed in two phases in Fântânele and Cogealac on an area of 1,100 hectares (2,700 acres). The construction of the first phase of the wind farm on a 600 hectares (1,500 acres) plot of land started at Fântânele in October 2008 with the construction of 137 kilometres (85 mi) of access roads as well as the foundations for the wind turbines leaving a distance of 700 metres (2,300 ft) between them. The land on which the wind farm is built is partially owned by the CEZ Group but most of it is leased for a period of 49 years from local land owners, who receive around €3,000 per year each in royalties. For the connection of the individual turbines and the transportation of electricity 150 kilometres (93 mi) of cables were laid. CEZ also built four electric power transformation substations that are used to increase the voltage from 33kV to 110 kV and one main transformation station used to further increase the voltage to 400 kV so it can be suitable for use by Transelectrica, the national electric power transmission company of Romania. For the construction of the 137 kilometres (85 mi) of roads 950,000 tonnes of crushed rock was used, and for the construction of a single wind turbine foundation 40 tonnes of rebar and 400 cubic metres of concrete were used as well as 105 pilings used to stabilise the structure driven into the earth at depths of up to 24 metres (79 ft).

The project's components were manufactured in several countries. Blades were manufactured in Brazil, Spain and Germany; nacelles in Germany; towers segments in Germany and China, with many internal electrical components coming from the United States. According to the rhythm of construction as much as 50 trucks enter and leave the site on an average day transporting around 8,000 tonnes of materials on a weekly basis, but figures were as high as 10,000 tonnes per day at the beginning of the construction. For the assembly of the wind turbines giant cranes are used with lifting capacities between 500 and 700 tonnes. The Fântânele wind farm was expected to cost around €600 million. The first wind turbine at Fântânele to be connected to the national grid was commissioned on 1 June 2010 having the number FE-28.

The construction of the second phase of the wind farm on a 500 hectares (1,200 acres) plot of land at Cogealac started in 2010 but was postponed due to issues and conflicts with the mayor of Cogealac, Cati Hristu. This phase included the erecting of 101 General Electric 2.5xl wind turbines with a nominal power output of 252.5 MW. The Cogealac wind farm involves capital investments of around €500 million and was complete in November 2012.
