= EDP Peștera Wind Farm =

Wind farm in Romania

EDP Peştera Wind Farm
- Country: Romania
- Location: Peștera, Constanța County
- Coordinates: 44°12′N 28°00′E
- Status: Complete
- Commission date: 2010
- Owner: EDP Renováveis

Power generation
- Units operational: 30
- Nameplate capacity: 90 MW

The EDP Peştera Wind Farm is located in Peștera a commune in the Constanța County of Romania. Costing €200 million, the wind farm consists of 30 three-bladed Danish wind turbines, each capable of generating 3 megawatts (MW) of power, giving a total output of 90 MW. The EDP Peştera Wind Farm is the sister project of the EDP Cernavodă Wind Farm, a 138 MW wind farm located 10 kilometres (6.2 mi) west of the Peştera farm close to the Cernavodă Nuclear Power Plant and the Danube – Black Sea Canal.

The wind farm is owned by EDP Renováveis, the renewable energy branch of the Portuguese conglomerate Energias de Portugal.
