= Enel Agighiol Wind Farm =

Wind farm in Romania

Enel Agichiol Wind Farm
- Country: Romania
- Location: Agighiol, Tulcea County
- Status: Complete
- Commission date: 2010
- Construction cost: US$50 million
- Owner: Enel

Power generation
- Nameplate capacity: 34 MW
- Annual net output: 100 million KWh

The Enel Agighiol Wind Farm is wind farm located in Tulcea County, Romania. It has 17 individual wind turbines with a nominal output of around 2 MW each and delivers up to 34 MW of power, enough to power over 35,000 homes, which required a capital investment of approximately US$50 million.
