= Emergency disconnect package =

An Emergency Disconnect Package (EDP) is a piece of equipment used in the drilling and work-over (servicing or modification) of deep sea oil & gas wells, by Mobile Offshore Drilling Rigs (MODU's) and Well Intervention Vessels (WIV's). The EDP is designed for use in an emergency, when the MODU or WIV needs to quickly disconnect, and move away from the oil/gas well that it is drilling or working-over. Examples of when this might be necessary include unexpected extreme weather that exceeds the MODU/Vessel's capability to maintain its position.

Under normal operating conditions, the MODU/WIV (which is floating on the sea surface) is connected to the oil/gas well (which is drilled in the sea bed) by a vertical (or near-vertical) piece of steel pipe, called a marine riser. Tools and fluids are moved within the marine riser as required to/from the well. At the bottom of the marine riser, the EDP and other components that connect the riser to the well and allow the well to be shut-in when required, constitute a 'Lower Riser Package' (LRP).

When required to do so, the EDP disconnects from the LRP and isolates the riser from the environment. Thus the EDP allows the MODU/WIV to safely and quickly disconnect from the subsea well and move away in an emergency. The EDP is designed to carry out its function while under load with a high disconnection angle.

An EDP consists of a connector to the rest of the LRP, an isolation valve, an accumulator, a subsea control module and a connection point at the top for connection to the riser pipe. A production retainer valve shuts in the riser and the annulus master valve shuts in the riser. A crossover valve allows circulation of the riser after disconnection. <refs. IADC Drilling Lexicon / API RP 17G, Recommended Practice for Completion/Workover Risers / API RP 96, Deepwater Well Design and Construction / GSO Engineering>
