= Lower riser package =

The Lower Riser Package is a mechanical device to protect an oil well located underwater (subsea) and used during an oil well intervention. The LRP is essentially a mini blow out preventer (BOP). The lower riser package consists of a connector to the subsea oil well, a series of safety valves and a connection point at the top for connection to the riser pipe. The riser pipe is essentially a mini Marine riser and has a maximum inside diameter of 7 inches. A marine riser has a maximum inside diameter of 19 inches.

The LRP is used within what is called a workover system. A workover system is basically a series of valves and high strength pipe connecting a floating drilling rig to the subsea Christmas tree.

This device is also known as a lower marine riser package (LMRP).

== See also ==
- Workover Riser System
