= Electricity Museum (Portugal) =

Museum in Lisbon, Portugal

Coordinates: 38°41′45″N 9°11′43″W

- Museu da Electricidade
- The Electricity Museum
- Established: 1990
- Location: Avenida de Brasília, 1300-598 Lisbon, Portugal
- Type: Science and Industrial Archaeology
- Website: EDP: Museu da Electricidade

The Electricity Museum is a science and industrial heritage museum in Lisbon, Portugal.

The Electricity Museum unfolds along the perimeter of the old thermoelectric plant – the Tejo Power Station, which illuminated the city of Lisbon for more than four decades.

It opened as a museum in 1990. Ten years later, the Electricity Museum's buildings and equipment underwent a period of rehabilitation, to reopen in 2006 fully renovated and with a new discourse and museum proposals.

The Tejo Power Station is a part of the heritage and structure of the EDP Foundation. In 2015 EDP announced that from 2016 the museum will form part of Museum of Art, Architecture and Technology.

== Architecture ==
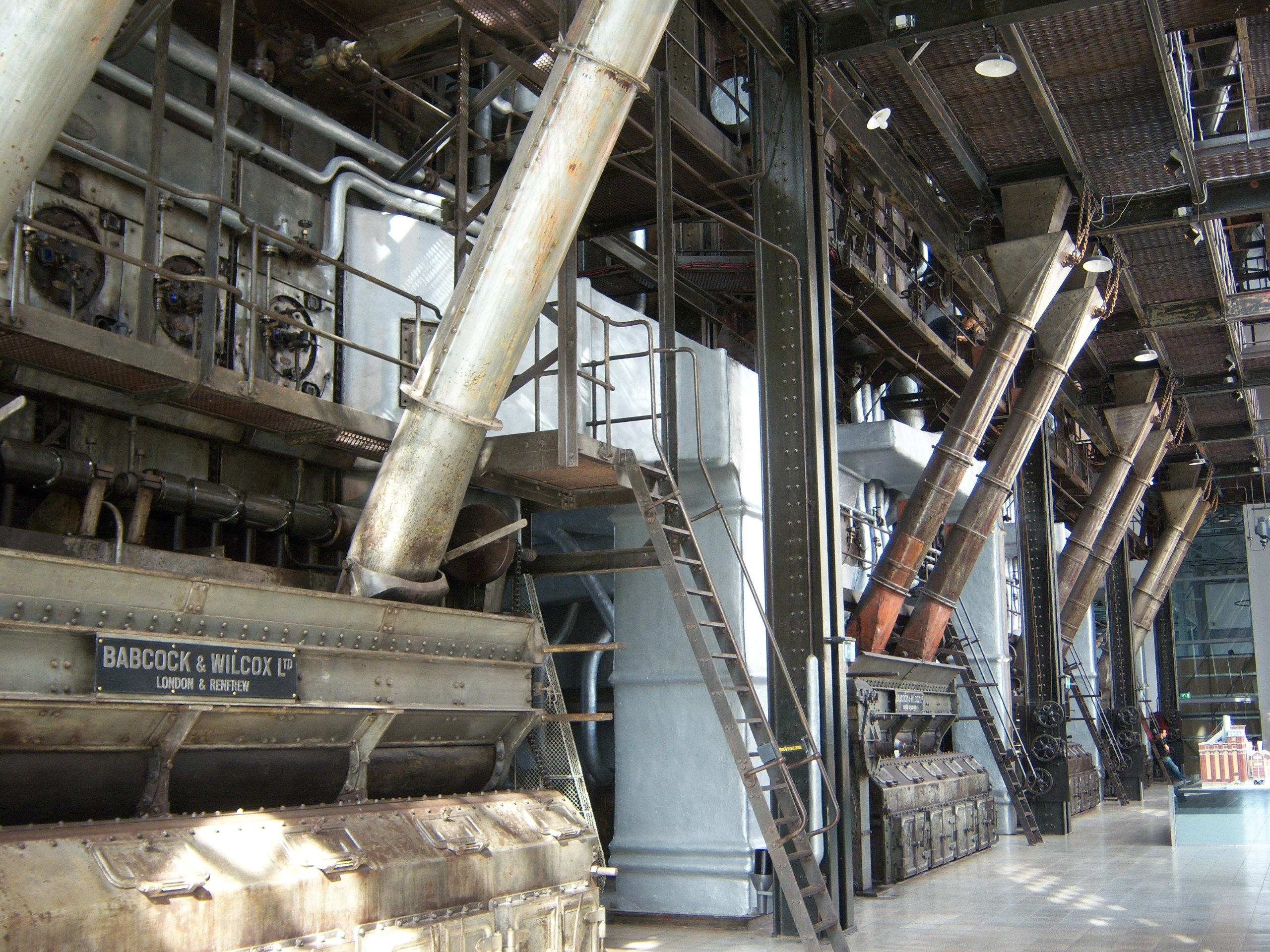
Boiler Room.

The Tejo Power Station complex is a former thermoelectric plant that supplied electricity to Lisbon and its surrounding area. The building is features an iron structure covered with brick, representing Portuguese industrial architecture from the first half of the 20th century.

Tejo Power Station was built between 1908 and 1951, thereby undergoing several stages of expansion throughout this period. Its structure follows the western type of architecture of iron covered with brick, which shapes and decorates the facades in artistic styles that range from arte-nouveau, in its older sections (low-pressure building), to classicism in the more contemporary parts (high-pressure building). With the station's expansion, additional adjoining terrain and buildings were acquired over the years, becoming the great industrial complex it is today, with various cultural functions, always with the Tagus River, its namesake, in the backdrop.

Due to its state of conservation, the Museum underwent restoration work between 2001 and 2005 to consolidate its structure, renew its facades and interior machinery and, with a new museum project, transform it into what it is today.

In October 2015 EDP announced that London-based architectural practice AL A formed by Amanda Levete is designing a Kunsthalle sitting alongside the existing museum, to host a wide-ranging programme of exhibitions under the leadership of Pedro Gadahno. The new building was set to open in 2016 as MAAT – Museu de Arte, Arquitetura e Tecnologia.

== Virtual Visit ==
It begins at the Praça do Carvão (Coal Square), the reception space and also a venue for exhibits and events. Here, tons of coal arriving from the Tagus River, was unloaded to supply the boilers. In this same square, visitors can observe the sieve, the silos and the bucket elevators that mixed and carried the coal to the building's upper section and the High-Pressure boilers.

Entry into the industrial complex is made through the Sala de Exposições (Exhibition Room), the building that used to house the Low-Pressure boilers; currently, it is a free space where temporary exhibits take place and where one can still see the steam expansion ducts and coal silos from the long gone boilers.

From here one can access the Sala das Caldeiras (Boiler Room), the building containing the four old High-Pressure boilers. They are each 30-metres high and with its respective control panels, air and fuel circuits, ventilators etc. One boiler can be entered to see its structure and internal components (conveyor belt, Bailey walls, naphtha burners, water heating tubes, etc.). Aside from the boilers, this large space also tells the story of the construction of the Tejo Power Station and gives a first approach to the difficult working conditions endured by its workers.

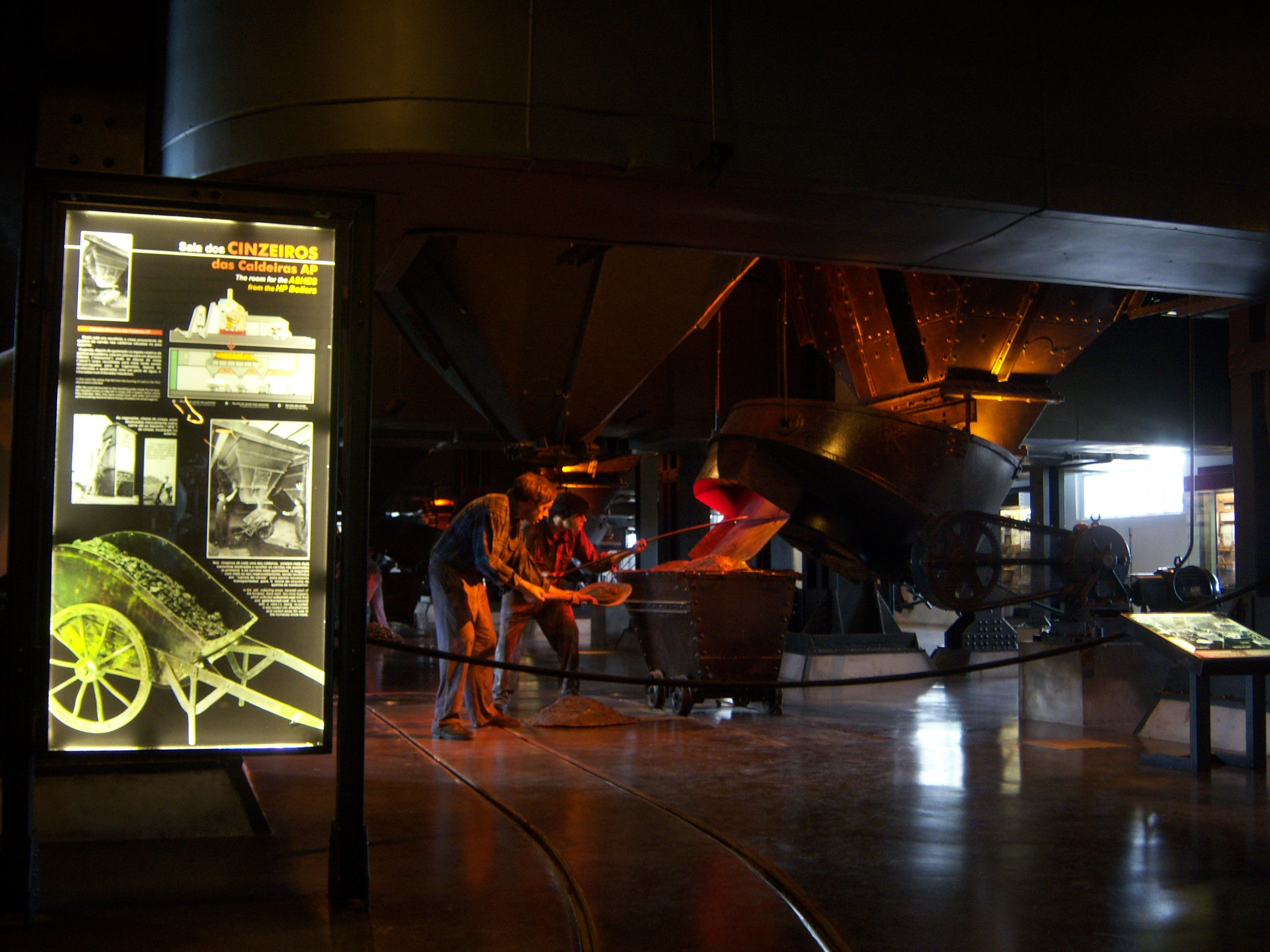
View of the High Pressure Boilers' Ash Room.

The Sala dos Cinzeiros (Ash Room) is located on the bottom floor, the area where ash from the burned and raw coal was collected. Particular emphasis is given to the hard working conditions in this space, due to the intense heat and breathing in of ash from the coal burning. Examples of forging, carpentry and transport, as well as the origins and types of coal, are also presented.

The tour continues in the Sala do Experimentar (Experimentation Room), which is divided into three sections: one dedicated to energy sources (both renewable and fossils), another to the scientists who over history contributed to breakthroughs in electric power production, and a third "learning by playing" area where there are several types of educational modules and games dealing with power.

After experimentation, the Sala da Água (Water Room) is next. In this and the following space, the Sala das Máquinas (Machinery Room), the museum's discourse is the same as in the boiler room, with multicoloured tubes running between the machines and along the walls and ceiling. Each colour corresponds to a type of fluid that circulated in the tube: dry steam, wet steam, water etc. Back in the Water Room, visitors can observe the water treatment process that enables the water to later be used in the boilers. The machines that are seen here are electropumps, blowers, filters or distillers from the 1940s.

Immediately following this room lies the Sala dos Condensadores (Condenser Room), the space that displays the condensers for steam refrigeration, as well as the pumps that drained water from the Tagus River, the cold source essential to the Thermoelectric Plant's operation. In the room's upper section where the circuit breakers from the station's generator groups are displayed, there is a permanent exhibit called Faces of the Tejo Power Station, an homage to the Power Station's workers through photographs and audiovisuals that show their activity and working conditions.

View of the Generator Room, with a musealised turbo-alternator

On the floor above the condensers, the Sala dos Geradores (Generator Room) is found, where two of the Station's five sets of turbo alternators are exhibited. One of them was opened to show the internal components and allow visitors a better perception of how electric power was generated.

Finally, on an upper level, there is the Sala de Comando (Control Room); the place where the generators were controlled from, as was the substation and the respective power distribution through the electric network powered by the station. Today, this space is converted into yet another experimentation area where the museum guides explain the history of electric power production through practical, everyday examples, such as battery lemons, or how renewable energy works, or by simplifying the production process of the station itself with a gas tank and a pressure cooker, all of this from an educational perspective adjusted to the audience in question.

== Collection ==
Tejo Power Station (Electricity Museum's) wealth is not limited only to the museum's visible aspects, but also includes its collection. The priority has been to recover elements that are worth exhibiting, through their restoration and conservation, as well as the acquisition, preservation and inventory of new pieces from other facilities from all over the country, or from private donors.

At the moment, the Museum houses a large quantity of movable effects on exhibit, such as boilers, turbo alternators and condensers from the 1930s-1950s, as well as collector's items, such as pieces and equipment dating from the end of the 19th century until modern times. To highlight, the collection of household appliances, electric machines, pieces and molds of public and private lighting in wood and iron, laboratory equipment, valves, models etc.

== Documentation Centre ==
The purpose of Tejo Power Station Documentation Centre is to establish itself in a centre that specialises in the study and knowledge of energy, electricity in particular. It contains approximately 60,000 volumes of documentation in several formats (documents, blueprints, books, videos, etc.) which cover the period dating from 1848 to the present day. More than 90,000 photographs and approximately 15,000 books, most of them specialising in electricity (in all its aspects: technical, constructive, economic, historic or social), as well as monographs on industrial heritage and archaeology, museology, themes surrounding general culture, encyclopedias and periodic publications.

The centre also has a policy regarding the identification and incorporation of documentation, which can be consulted on the internet or at the centre itself, as well as the publication of monographs on the history of electricity in Portugal.

== Activities ==
Throughout the year, many activities are carried out at the Electricity Museum, both inside and outside, such as temporary exhibits, concerts, conferences, etc.

Thus, the Coal Square serves not only to welcome visitors to the Museum, but occasionally transforms into an open-sky venue where a variety of events are held.

== See also ==
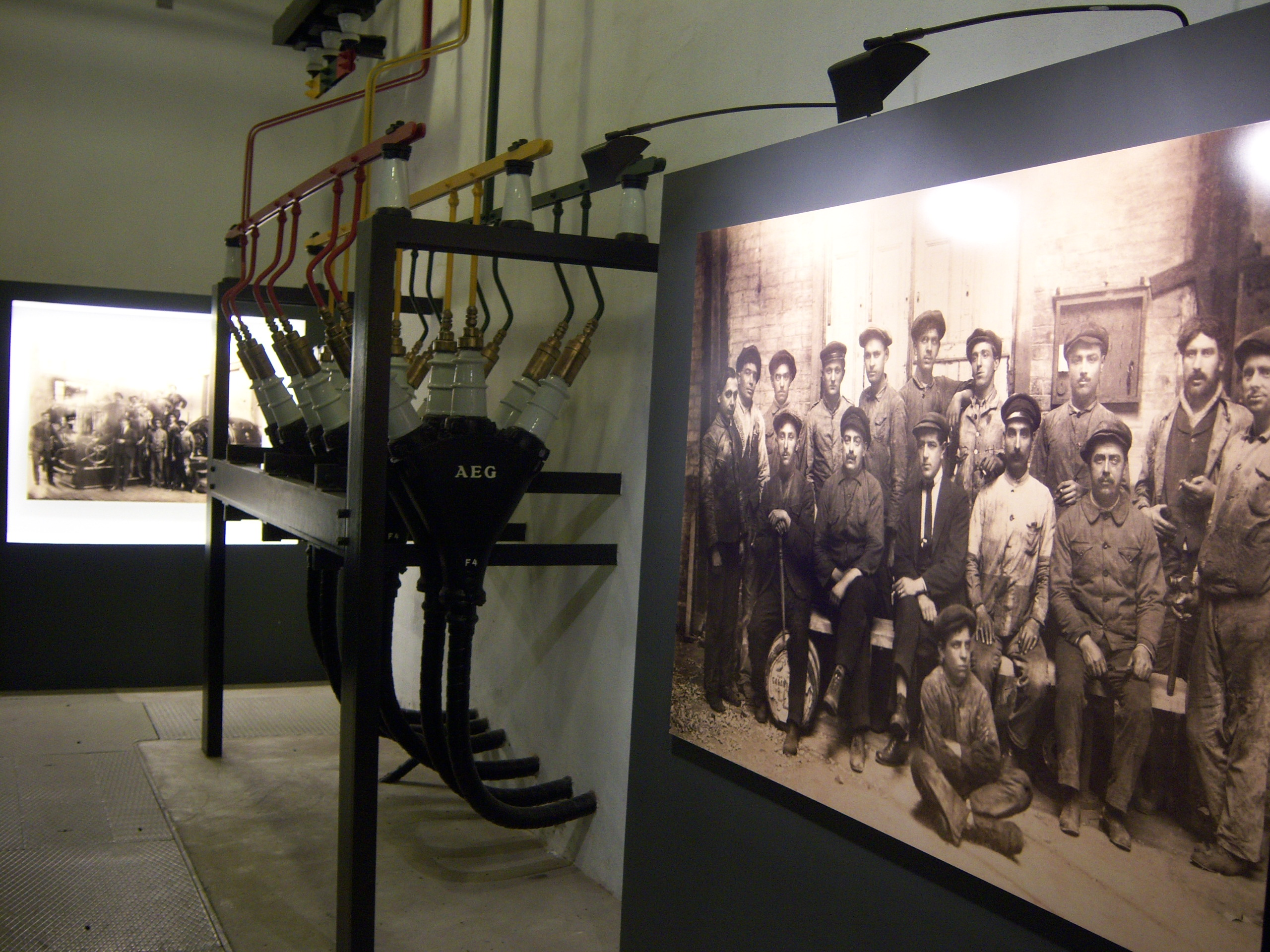
Condenser Room. Detail of the circuit breakers and "Faces of the Tejo Power Station" exhibit.

- Tejo Power Station topics
- Tejo Power Station (history)
