= Sălbatica I Wind Farm =

Wind farm in Romania

- Country: Romania
- Location: Tulcea, Tulcea County
- Status: Complete
- Commission date: 2011
- Construction cost: US$100 million
- Owners: Enel, Epplament Energy

Power generation
- Nameplate capacity: 70 MW
- Annual net output: 200 million KWh

The Sălbatica I Wind Farm is wind farm located in Tulcea County, Romania. It has 35 individual wind turbines with a nominal output of around 2 MW each and delivers up to 70 MW of power, enough to power over 66,000 homes, which required a capital investment of approximately US$100 million.
