= Tejo Power Station =

Historical power station

Coordinates: 38°41′44″N 9°11′44″W

Tejo Power Station seen from the Tagus River (Rio Tejo).

The Tejo Power Station was a thermoelectric power plant owned by the Companhias Reunidas de Gás e Electricidade (CRGE – United Gas and Electric Companies), which supplied power to the city and entire Lisbon region.

It is located in the Belém district of Portugal's capital and its activity spanned from 1909 to 1972, although as of 1951 it was used as a reserve power station. Over time, it underwent several adjustments and expansions, going through many different phases of construction and production.

It now houses the Museu da Electricidade (Electricity Museum).

== Introduction ==
The original Tejo Power Station, whose buildings no longer exist, was built in 1909 and operated until 1921. In 1914, construction began on the low pressure boiler buildings and the machinery room, which were later expanded several times. Finally, in 1941 construction on the high pressure boiler building took place, the power station's largest structure, which was expanded in 1951 with the addition of another boiler.

Despite operating for the last time in 1972, it was only officially shut down in 1975, thus proving its great importance to the city of Lisbon as industrial archaeological heritage. For this reason, in 1986 it was classified as an Asset of Public Interest. Since 1990, the Tejo Power Station is open as the Electricity Museum.

== History ==
The buildings built in 1909, and which no longer exist, comprised the original Tejo Power Station, which remained operational until 1921. It was designed and projected by engineer Lucien Neu, and construction was undertaken by the company Vieillard & Touzet (the latter, Fernand Touzet, a disciple of Gustave Eiffel).

For years, the machinery was altered in order to increase the plant's output, and in 1912, when all the equipment was installed, the plant had fifteen small Belleville boilers and five generating sets with a 7,75MW output. From 1916 until being deactivated in 1921, it received steam from the new boilers installed in the current low pressure building, and was shut down, dismantled and used as storage space and workshops from that time until 1938, when it was demolished to make room for construction of the high pressure boiler building.

=== Low Pressure Phase ===
The low pressure naves began construction in 1914 and were completed in 1930, going through three very important construction phases. The first (from 1914 to 1921) included construction of two industrial naves for the boilers, the machinery room for the alternators and for the substation. The second phase (from 1924 to 1928) included the first expansion of the boiler room with a new longitudinal nave, the purchase of a new generating set, construction of a coal distributor and the docks to the refrigeration circuit's channels. Finally, it was in the third phase (from 1928 to 1930) that the final expansion was carried out on the boiler room–with a new industrial nave of greater proportions than the previous ones–the machinery room and the substation.

Thus, in the 1930s, the plant's boiler room included eleven low pressure boilers: ten Babcock & Wilcox and one Humboldt. The machinery room comprised five generating sets of varying outputs and brands: Escher & Wiss, AEG (two sets), Stal-Asea and Escher Wiss/Thompson.

=== High Pressure Phase ===
With the increased output from the two new AEG turbo-alternator sets installed in 1934, it was necessary to install new boilers that would operate with high pressure steam. Construction was carried out on property previously occupied by the original Tejo Power Station, which was demolished in 1938 to make way for construction of this new high pressure boiler building, the facility's most impressive structure. Inside, it housed three large Babcock & Wilcox high pressure boilers, which began operating in 1941.

With the destruction of the original Tejo Power Station and the installation of the high pressure boiler building, the need arose for space for workshops and storage space. Thus the CRGE purchased the properties adjoining the eastern side of the complex, where the old Senna Sugar Estates, Ltd. sugar refinery–owned by the Companhia de Açúcar de Moçambique (Mozambique Sugar Company) –used to operate. It was also necessary to create an auxiliary room for water treatment, which was installed inside the low pressure boiler building, thus dismantling the first two boilers.

In 1950 the high pressure boiler building was expanded to include another boiler, which began operating the following year and constituted the plant's final expansion.

=== Integration into the National Electric Grid ===
With the entry into force in 1944 of Law 2002 – the National Electrification Law, which made producing hydroelectric power an absolute priority, the Tejo Power Station took on a secondary role in the electricity sector due to the construction of the first major hydroelectric station, the Castelo do Bode dam, which began operating in 1951, gradually turning the Tejo Power Station into a reserve station.

Nonetheless, the Tejo Power Station operated without interruption between 1951 and 1968, except for in 1961. In 1972, as follow-up to an attempt against the Salazar regime, high voltage lines carrying electric power to Lisbon from the Castelo do Bode hydroelectric station were pulled down, and the Tejo Power Station was once again reactivated, producing electricity for the last time in its history. It was officially shut down in 1975.

=== The Tejo Power Station as an Electricity Museum ===
After closing and nationalising the electric companies, it was decided that this old thermoelectric power station should be given new life and reopened for cultural purposes. The first team responsible for the museum was formed in 1986, and in 1990 it opened its doors to the general public.

Between 2001 and 2005, the museum underwent profound restructuring, from the entire architectural heritage to the museographic content. Finally, in 2006 the museum reopened its doors, but with a new type of museology which was much more educational and dynamic.

== Architectural Ensemble ==
After continuous transformations and expansions over the years, the Tejo Power Station's architectural ensemble represents the masterful conservation of a large manufacturing structure from the first half of the 20th century. The entire set of buildings is in perfect aesthetic harmony thanks to the use of an iron structure covered in brick on all the structures. Despite this, there are differences in style between the low pressure naves and the high pressure building.

== Operation ==
The operating principle of a thermoelectric power station is based on the burning of fuel to produce vapour which then turns an electric current generator. In theory, this is simple to carry out, but in practice it requires a complex combination of machines, circuits and logistics.

At the Tejo Power Station, the main fuel was coal, which arrived by river and was unloaded into the square with the same name in order to then be deposited in the crusher and sent to the mixing silos. From there, the coal was fed onto the conveyor belt running along the top of the building, and dropped onto the combustion belt inside the furnace. There it was burnt at a temperature of approximately 1200 °C. The heat thereby generated would turn the water passing through the boiler's inner tubes into steam, which was then carried to the turbo-alternators. The water used here travelled in a closed circuit and was chemically pure. For this, it went through a purification and filtering process to avoid deteriorating the station's equipment.

Thus, the steam would travel in the tubes at high pressure (38 kg/cm^{2}) to the generating sets, where the turbine would transform the steam's thermal energy into mechanical energy, and the alternator would transform the mechanical energy it received from the turbine into electric power, producing a 10.500 V triphasic electric current with a 50 Hz frequency, which after passing through the plant's substation, was distributed among consumers.

In turn, after running the turbines, the steam was sent to the condensers where it was turned back into water in order to be reused in the boilers. The hot steam returned to its liquid state through contact with the cold walls of the condenser's inner tubes, which carried water from the Tagus river. For that reason, the river water never came into direct contact with the purified water used as work fluid. From the condenser, the water was pumped back to the boilers, thereby closing the cycle.

== The Plant’s Working Conditions ==
The plant's operation would have been impossible without the people who worked there for generations. It was necessary to have a strict division of tasks and a shift work system in order to guarantee the station operated without interruption. The close to five hundred workers who laboured all day and night fulfilled more than forty-five different roles. Those jobs ranged from coal unloaders to the most specialised engineers and technicians, with workers in the boiler rooms and carpentry and ironwork workshops in between.

The hardest jobs were those involving coal burning, both in the boiler room and in the boiler dust (ash) room, with workers having to endure extremely high temperatures due to the coal burning inside the boilers, the dust originating from combustion and the deafening noise throughout the entire work shift. Even so, it was the boiler room that occupied the largest number of workers and had the greatest number of different tasks. It was here that the chief technical Engineer, technical engineers, head operators, sub-head operators, operators, stokers and workers (boiler dust extraction), all endured extremely harsh working conditions, especially the latter.

== Value of the Heritage ==
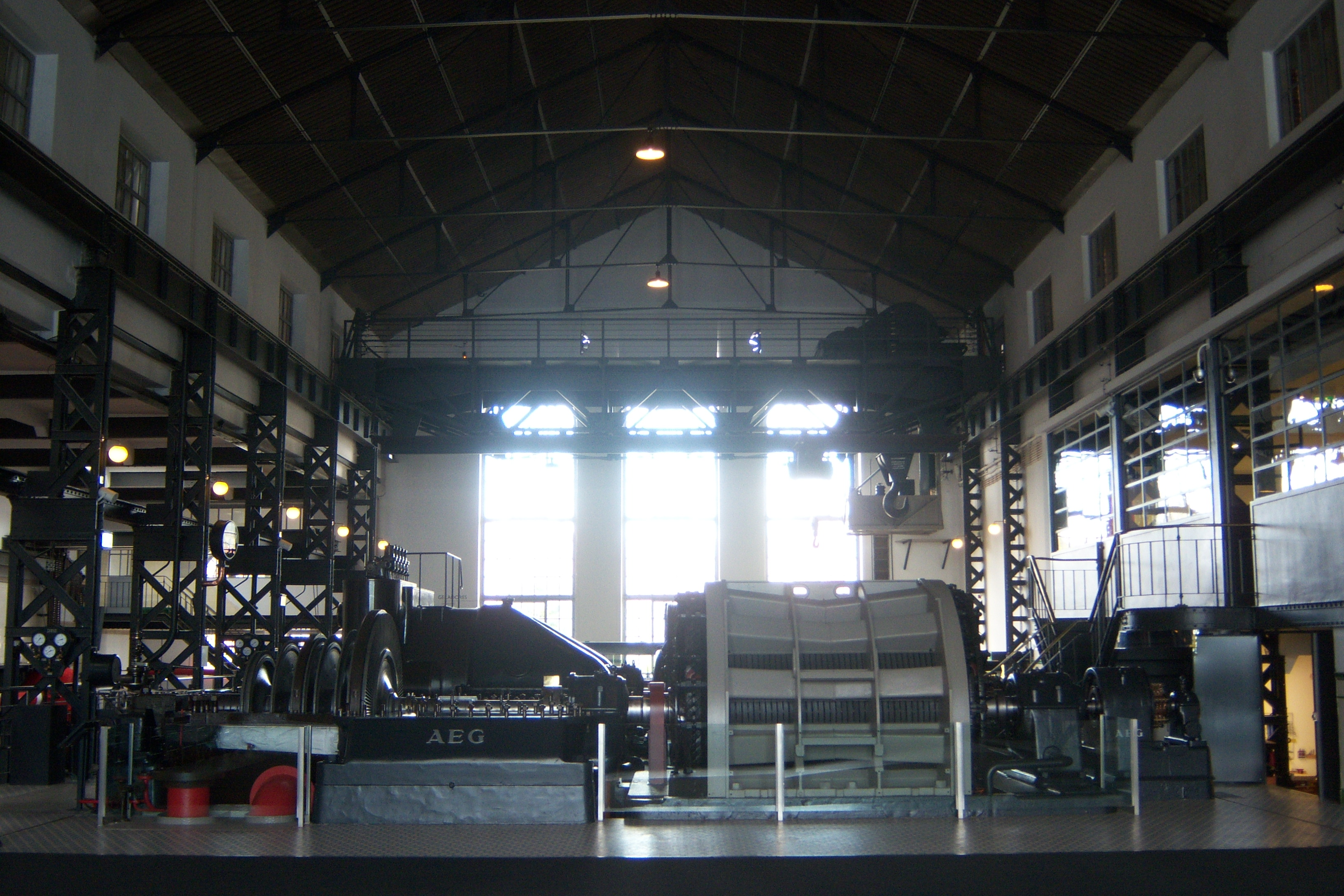
Musealised AEG alternator in the Machinery Room.

The Tejo Power Station has huge heritage value, not only in architectural or archaeological terms, but also from a historic, social, anthropological and economic perspective. The heritage left behind throughout the power station's activity is undeniable. It was the main power station in Lisbon and Portugal until the mid-20th century. Its reach covered the entire city and the Tagus Valley, lighting up streets and homes and providing factories with power. Without the Tejo Power Station, Lisbon's history would have been very different. It was the invisible factor in the city's growth and expansion in the 20th century, the cornerstone for regional industrialisation and the first electrified railway line in the country (Lisbon – Cascais).

At the same time, the Tejo Power Station was crucial to Lisbon's modernisation. Several generations worked by the boilers so that others could turn on the lights in their homes, walk through artificially lit streets at night, or travel in electric trams that climbed Lisbon's slopes. Aside from that, within the station's complex, there is also a set of assets that, by remaining intact, made this old thermoelectric power plant survive the deindustrialisation of the Belém district, thus making it unique in the country.

- Real estate assets. The Tejo Power Station manufacturing plant (classified as an Asset of Public Interest since 1986), with the low pressure and machinery room structures (1914-1930), high pressure and water room structures (1938-1951), and the plant's numerous workshops, whose set of buildings (which once belonged to the old sugar refinery and date back to the end of the 19th-beginning of the 20th century) are today the museum's Documentation Centre and Storage.
- Movable property. The museum currently houses four Babcock & Wilcox high pressure boilers dated 1941 and 1951 and two AEG turbo alternators dated 1942 with the respective condensers. Furthermore, there are coolers, circuit-breakers and measuring apparatuses in the machinery room, blowers, filters, pumps and distillers in the water room, all dating back to the 1940s. Other items include coal bucket elevators, trolleys, silos and carpentry and ironwork materials. In the storage and garden areas, there are also generator sets from other power plants, speed regulators, valves and several items associated with Lisbon’s public lighting, as well as household appliances of various periods, types and categories.

== Bibliography ==
- BARBOSA, Pires, CRUZ, Luís, FARIA, Fernando, A Central Tejo: A fábrica que electrificou Lisboa, Museu da Electricidade and ed. Bizânzio, Lisboa, 2007
- COSTA, Vítor, “Central Tejo. Breve resumo da sua evolução e dos seus processos tecnológicos (1906-1972)”, in Revista Arqueologia & Indústria, (2-3), pp. 149–160, Associação Portuguesa de Arqueologia Industrial (APAI), Lisboa, 1999/2000
- SANTOS, António, “Arquitectura de Tijolo e Indústria. A Introdução do Tijolo Sílico Calcário em Portugal (1903-1913)”, in Revista Arqueologia & Indústria, (1), pp. 101–114, Associação Portuguesa de Arqueologia Industrial (APAI), Lisboa, 1998
- SANTOS, António, “A Arquitectura da Electricidade em Portugal (1906-1911)”, in Revista Arqueologia & Indústria, (2-3), pp. 123–148, Associação Portuguesa de Arqueologia Industrial (APAI), Lisboa, 1999/2000
- Revista Indústria Portuguesa, nº. 101, 118, 153, 164, 171 and 179
- Wikienergia. Categories and subcategories from Central Tejo, Museu da Electricidade, Acervo and Centro de Documentação. Consulted in May 2010

== See also ==
- Tejo Power Station — all topics
- Industrial heritage
- Thermal power station
