= EDP Group =

Portuguese electric utilities company

EDP, S.A.
- Formerly: EDP - Energias de Portugal, S.A. Electricidade de Portugal, E.P.
- Type: Public (Sociedade Anónima)
- Traded as: Euronext Lisbon: EDP
- Industry: Electric utility
- Predecessor: Companhias Reunidas de Gás e Electricidade
- Founded: June 30, 1976; 50 years ago
- Headquarters: Lisbon, Portugal
- Key people: António Lobo Xavier (Chairman); Miguel Stilwell de Andrade (CEO)
- Products: Electrical power natural gas
- Services: Electricity generation and distribution, natural gas distribution
- Revenue: €16,202.31 M (2023)
- Operating income: €2,720.46 M (2023)
- Net income: €952.35 M (2023)
- Total assets: €56,696.67 M (2023)
- Total equity: €11,552.64 M (2023)
- Number of employees: 13,211 (2022)
- Subsidiaries: EDP Brasil; EDP Comercial; EDP Gás; EDP Renováveis (71.3%); E-REDES (former EDP Distribuição); HC Energía; Naturgás (through HC Energía); SU ELETRICIDADE (former EDP - Serviço Universal); Ocean Winds (jointly with Engie)
- Website: www.edp.com

EDP (formerly EDP - Energias de Portugal and Electricidade de Portugal) is a Portuguese electric utilities company, headquartered in Lisbon founded in 1976 through the merger of 14 nationalised electricity companies.

== History ==
EDP was founded as Electricidade de Portugal, E.P. by the Portuguese government though the Decreto-lei n.º 502/76 published on 30 Jun 1976, merging 14 former energy companies that had been nationalised by 1975 in the aftermath of the regime change in 1974, of which the most significant had been the Companhia Portuguesa de Eletricidade (CPE). In 1991, through Decreto-Lei n.º 07/91 of 8 January, the Government changed EDP's legal status from a Public Company to a Public Limited Company with exclusively public capital.

In May 1994, after a profound restructuration of EDP, S.A., carried out between 1991 and 1993, under the Tutelary of Mira Amaral, Minister of Industry e Energy of the XII Portuguese Constitutional Government and the Presidency of Joaquim Serrão da Silva Correia, the EDP Group have been constituted with a Holding and 19 companies, six of them responding to the main core business activities: CPPE - Companhia Portuguesa de Produção de Electricidade (electricity production); REN - Rede Eléctrica Nacional (electricity transportation); and four companies of regional electricity distribution: EN - Electricidade do Norte; CENEL - Electricidade do Centro; LTE - Electricidade de Lisboa e Vale do Tejo; and SLE - Electricidade do Sul.

In March 2007, the group made a US$3 billion takeover of Horizon Wind Energy, the Texan-based wind power producer. At the time, it was the largest renewable energy deal to date and made EDP the fourth-largest wind power producer in the world.

China Three Gorges Corporation, a SOE, won in December 2011 the bidding for the Portuguese government's 21.35% interest in the company.

As of October 2026, approximately 37% of EDP's share stock was controlled by Three Gorges (22.2%), BlackRock (8.6%) and Oppidum Capital (6.8%). 62% was owned by other shareholders.

In late 2018 the largest shareholder, China Three Gorges Corporation, proposed a hostile takeover of EDP. This was ultimately rejected at the shareholders meeting on 24 April 2019.

In 2020, EDP agreed to buy Viesgo, more than doubling its presence in Spain's electricity distribution market.

On 10 April 2024, the company decided at a general meeting of shareholders to change its name to simply "EDP, S.A.", dropping "Energias de Portugal" from the name. The objective was to "simplify the image" and "adjust the corporate name to an increasingly global company".

In 2026, EDP estimated losses of approximately €80 million after Storm Kristin devastated parts of Portugal. Over six thousand kilometres of network were affected by Kristin.

== Operations ==
In 2006 35% of the energy produced by EDP was from renewable energy sources, and, as of the end of 2007, the company announced that 39% of its energy was already emissions-free and that it was aiming for a 75% renewable energy production by 2013.

In November 2019, EDP announced that it had reached a 50/50 Joint Venture agreement with the French gas and power company Engie to merge their fixed and floating offshore wind power activities, primarily targeting markets in Europe, the United States and selected geographies in Asia. That company is Ocean Winds.

== Foundation ==
The EDP Foundation is a non-profit organization set up and financed by the company as a means to foster the development of cultural, scientific, and educational activities. It is headquartered at Central Tejo, a former CRGE-owned 50 MW coal-powered plant at the Lisbon riverfront, decommissioned in the 1960s. Since 1990 it houses the Electricity Museum, recently incorporated in the broader MAAT – Museum of Art, Architecture, and Technology, which is the main focal point of the foundation's activities.

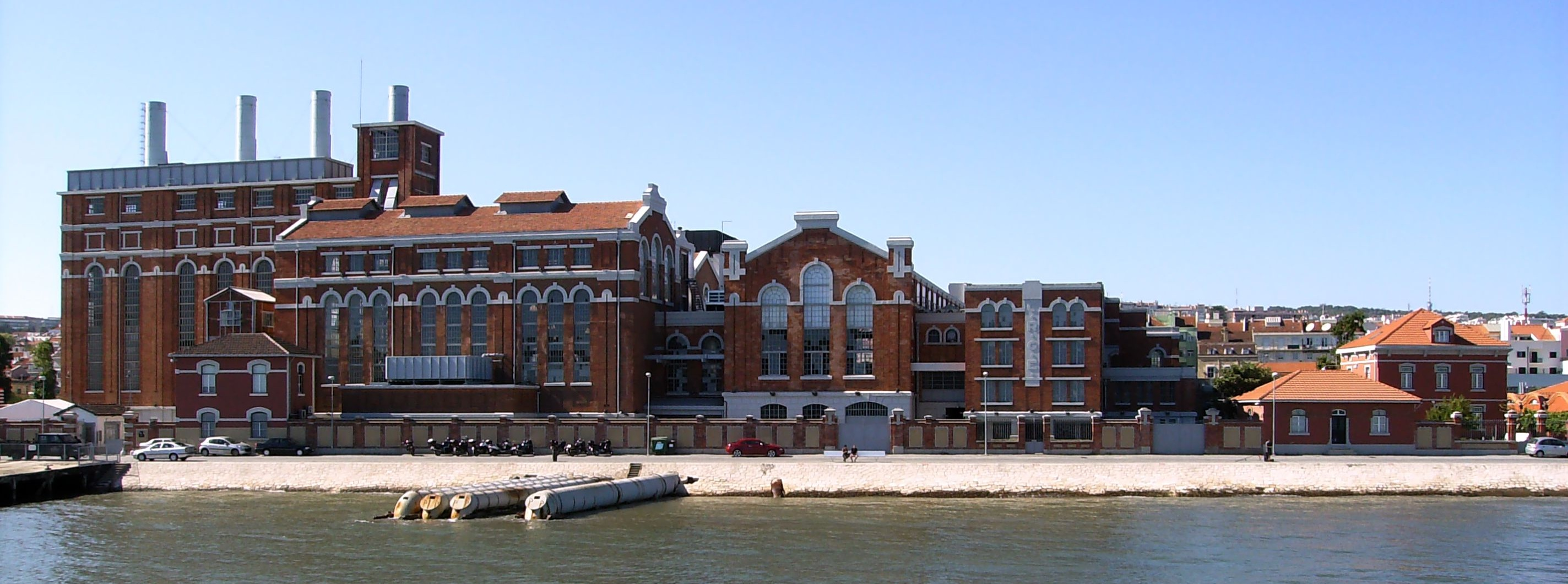
Tejo Power Station seen from the Tagus River (Rio Tejo) in 2009, before the construction of the MAAT.

== Carbon intensity ==
Year	Production (TWh)	Emission (Gt CO_{2})	kg CO_{2}/MWh
2002	39	26.9	690
2003	43	23.25	536
2004	39	23.89	614
2005	42	28.26	677
2006	43	24.48	565
2007	43	23.42	544
2008	40	19.78	500
2009	42	20.01	477

== See also ==
- EDP Renováveis

== Gallery ==
EDP headquarters by Aires Mateus

EDP headquarters, viewed from Avenida 24 de Julho

EDP headquarters, view toward the Tagus between the wings

EDP headquarters, covered public courtyard

EDP Sede II by ELEMENTAL

EDP Sede II, cantilever above the sloping approach

EDP Sede II, inclined concrete wall and glazed opening

EDP Sede II, passage and stair structure
