= Estádio Serra Dourada =

Football stadium in Goiânia, Goiás, Brazil

Coordinates: 16°41′56″S 49°14′02″W

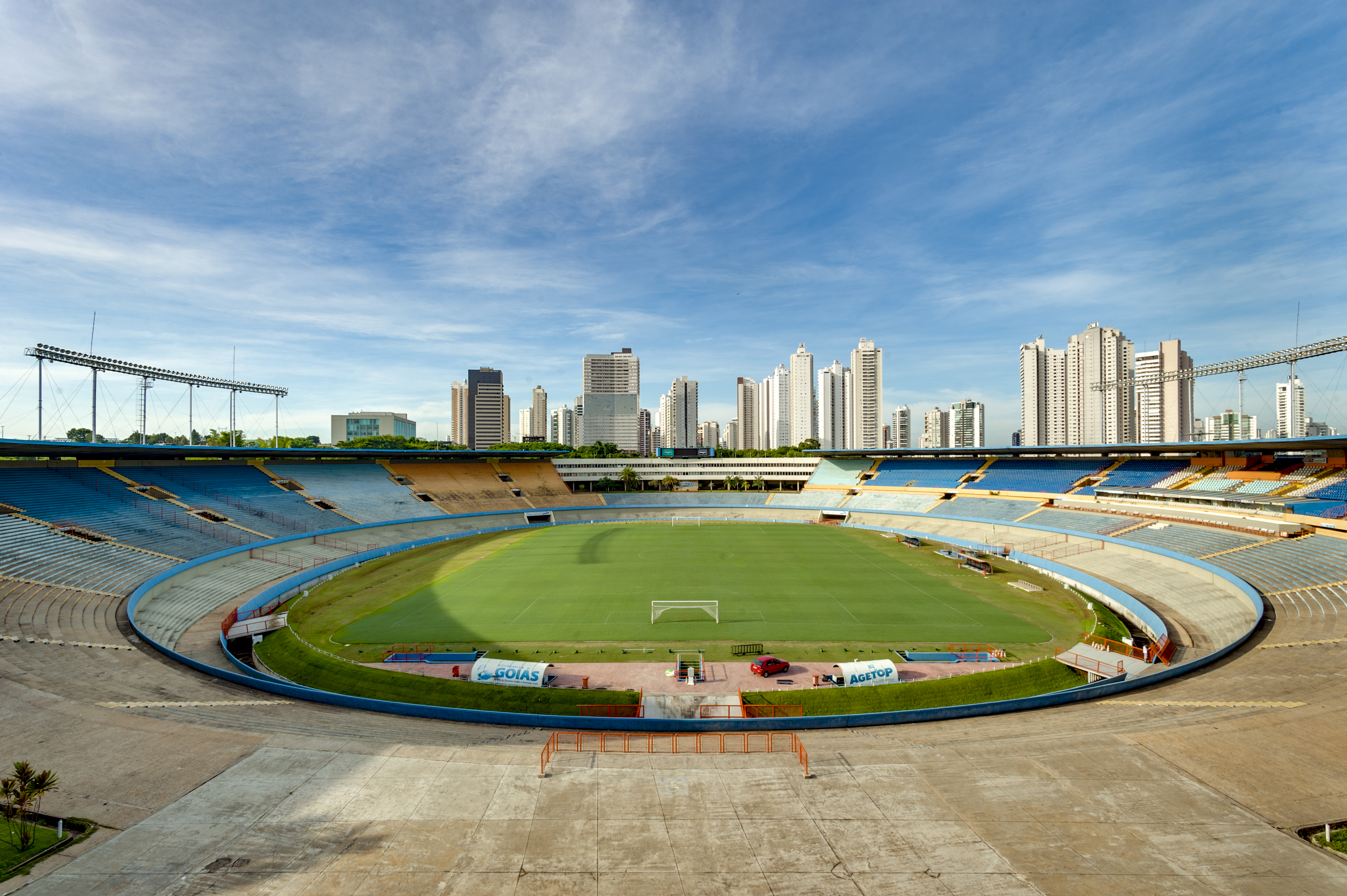
- Sisbrace
- Interactive map of Estádio Serra Dourada
- Location: Goiânia, Goiás, Brazil
- Owner: State of Goiás
- Capacity: 42,049
- Surface: Bermuda Celebration
- Record attendance: 77,790 (Goiás State vs Brazil)
- Field size: 105 x 68 m

Construction
- Opened: March 9, 1975; 51 years ago
- Architect: Paulo Mendes da Rocha

Tenants
- Goiás; Vila Nova; Atlético Goianiense

Estádio Serra Dourada is a football stadium inaugurated on March 9, 1975 in Goiânia, Goiás, Brazil. It was designed by the Pritzker Prize-winning Brazilian architect Paulo Mendes da Rocha. The stadium is owned by the Goiás state Government and primarily hosts state matches. Vila Nova, Goias Esporte Clube and Atlético Goianiense all have their own stadiums which they use for most league games, but for derbies and other big games they move to the Serra Dourada.

== History ==
Serra Dourada was completed in 1975 and was inaugurated on March 9 of that same year. It was one of the venues of the 1989 Copa América. The stadium was also the neutral ground used by CONMEBOL in the 1981 Copa Libertadores group stage replay match between Flamengo and Atlético Mineiro, in which Flamengo was declared the winner by CONMEBOL, after five Atlético Mineiro players were sent off by referee José Roberto Wright.

The inaugural match was played on March 9, 1975, when Goiás State All-Stars beat the Portugal national team 2-1. The first goal of the stadium was scored by Portugal's Octávio. The inauguration match also marked the stadium's attendance record, at 79,610.

The inauguration of Serra Dourada opened the way for Goiás Esporte Clube supremacy in the Goiás State Championship. From 1975 onwards (the so-called "Serra Dourada Era") the club won the State Championship seventeen times, while Goiânia, once the biggest team in the state, would never win the championship again.

The ex-Beatle Paul McCartney performed at the stadium on May 6, 2013 as part of his Out There! Tour, this one being his first concert in the city. Hard Rock band Guns N' Roses continued their 2020 Tour at the stadium on September 11, 2022.
