= Paulo Mendes da Rocha =

Brazilian architect (1928–2021)

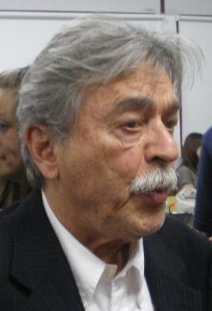
- Mendes da Rocha in 2009
- Born: October 25, 1928; Vitória, Espírito Santo, Brazil
- Died: May 23, 2021 (aged 92); São Paulo, Brazil
- Education: Mackenzie Presbyterian University
- Occupation: Architect
- Awards: Pritzker Architecture Prize (2006)
- Buildings: Serra Dourada Stadium, Gymnasium in the Paulistano Athletics Club, Pinacoteca do Estado, National Coach Museum

Paulo Mendes da Rocha (October 25, 1928 – May 23, 2021) was a Brazilian architect.

Mendes da Rocha attended the Mackenzie Presbyterian University College of Architecture, graduating in 1954. Working almost exclusively in Brazil, Mendes da Rocha began designing buildings in 1957, many of them built in concrete, a method some call "Brazilian Brutalism", arguably allowing buildings to be constructed cheaply and quickly. He contributed many notable cultural buildings to São Paulo and is widely credited with having enhanced and revitalized the city.

Mendes da Rocha was a professor at the Architecture College of University of São Paulo, known as FAU-USP, until 1998. His work was influenced by Brazilian architect Vilanova Artigas, from the paulist Brazilian School. He was honored with the Mies van der Rohe Prize (2000), the Pritzker Prize (2006), and the Venice Biennale Golden Lion for lifetime achievement (2016)., received Praemium Imperiale(2016)

Mendes da Rocha died on May 23, 2021, in São Paulo at the age of 92.

== Major works ==
Year	Building or product	Location
1957	Gymnasium in the Paulistano Athletics Club	São Paulo, Brazil
1957	Paulistano Armchair (reissued in 2004 by Objekto)	
1964	The Guaimbê Residential Building	São Paulo, Brazil
1969	Brazil's pavilion at Expo '70	Osaka, Japan
1973	Serra Dourada Stadium	Goiânia, Brazil
1987	Saint Peter Chapel	São Paulo, Brazil
1987	Forma Furniture showroom	São Paulo, Brazil
1988	Brazilian Sculpture Museum	São Paulo, Brazil
1992	Patriarch Plaza and Viaduct do Chá	São Paulo, Brazil
1993	Pinacoteca do Estado	São Paulo, Brazil
1997	FIESP Cultural Center	São Paulo, Brazil
2002	Patriarch Plaza	São Paulo, Brazil
2015	National Coaches Museum	Lisbon, Portugal
2017	Quelhas House	Lisbon, Portugal
2017	SESC 24 de Maio	São Paulo, Brazil

== Gallery ==
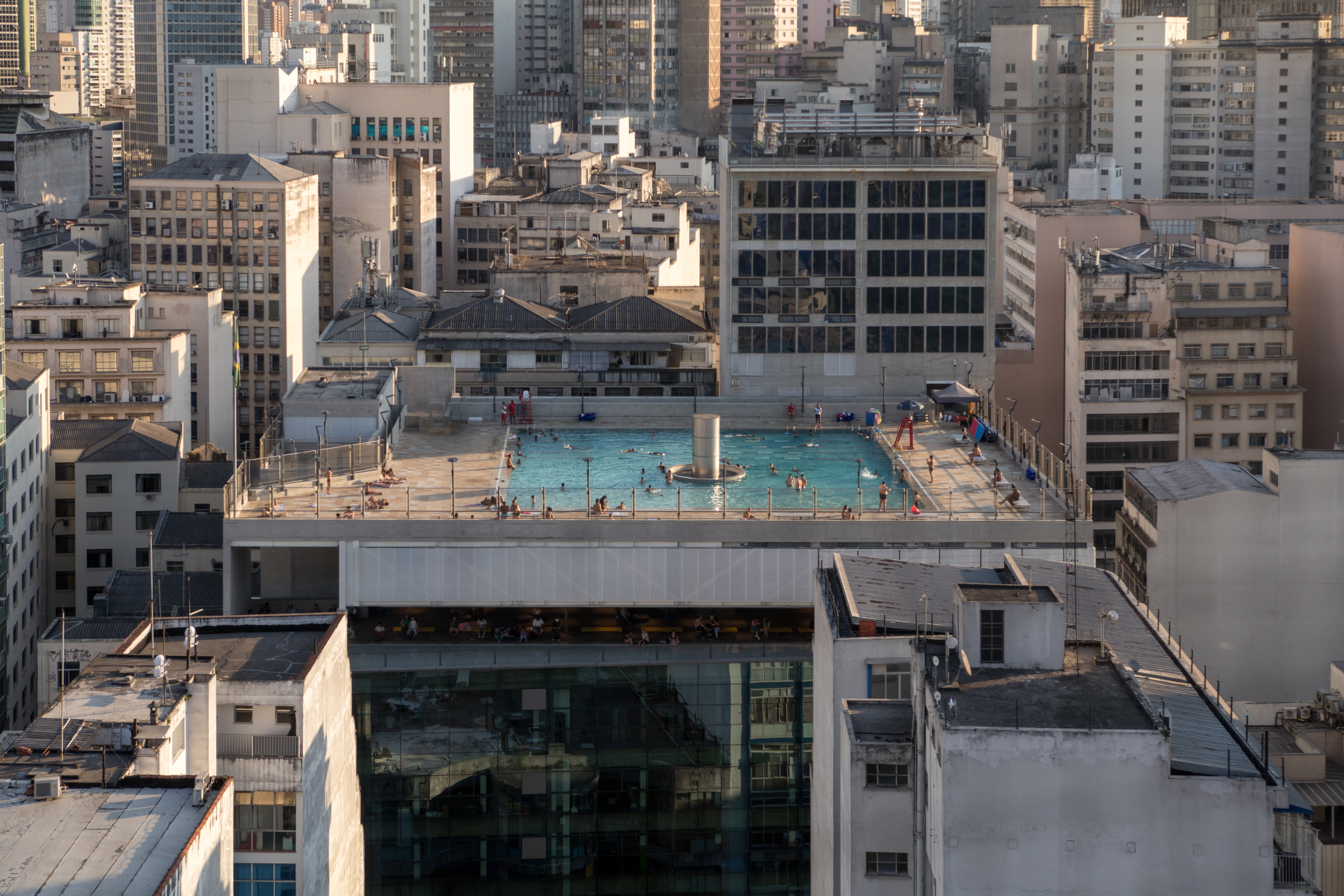
SESC 24 de Maio, São Paulo (2017)

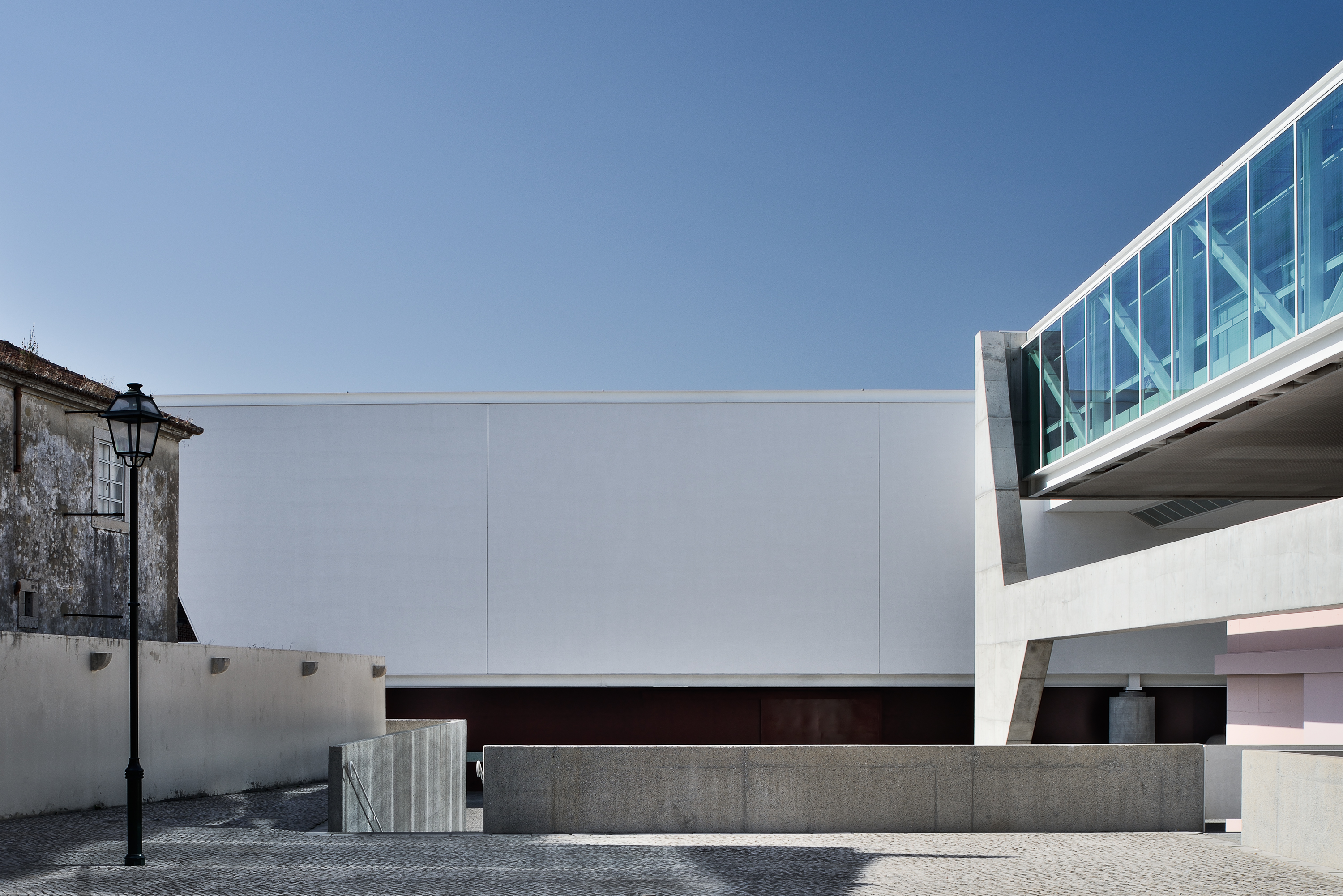
Museu dos Coches, Lisbon (2015)

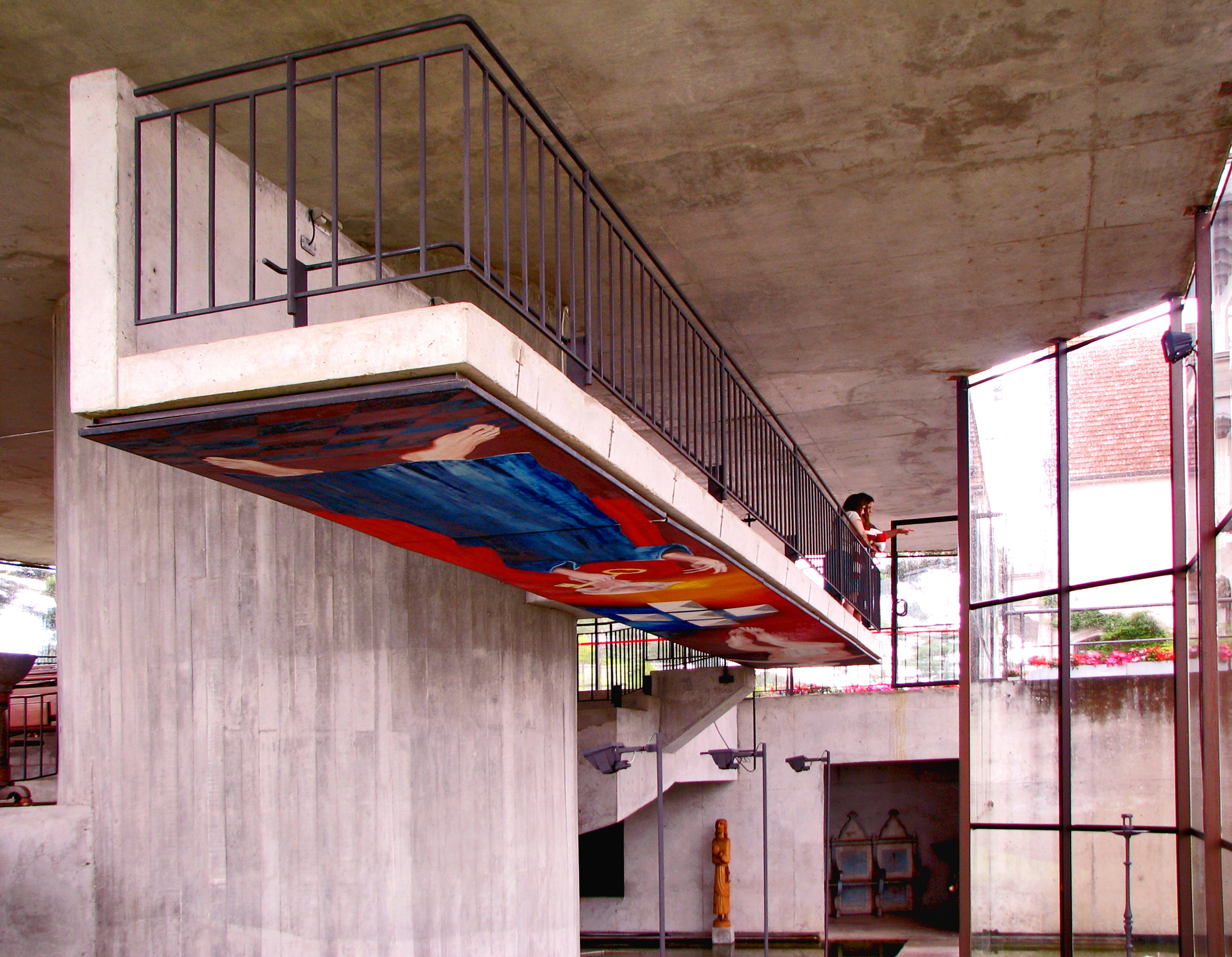
Saint Peter Chapel, São Paulo (1987)

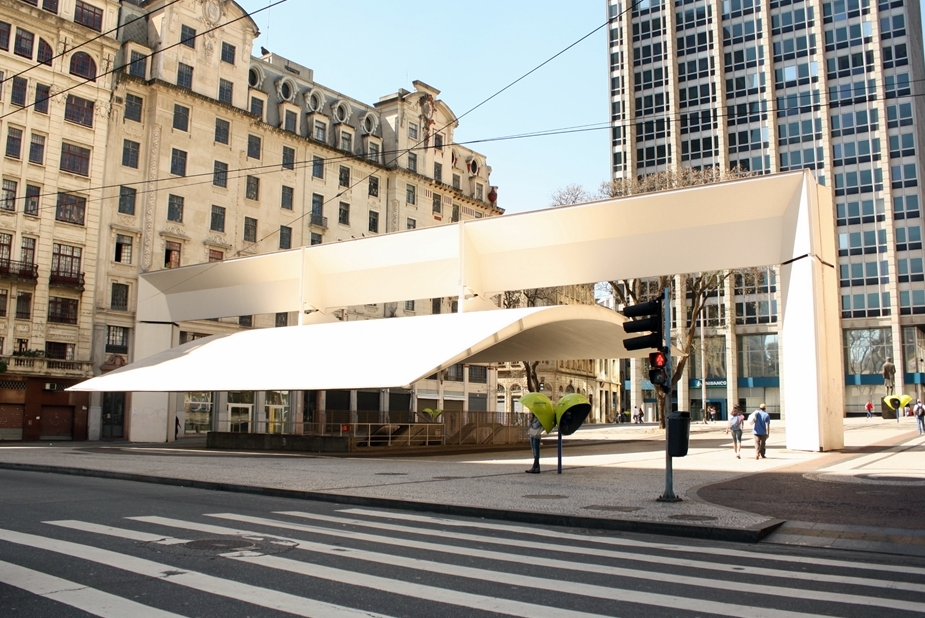
Patriarch Plaza, São Paulo (2002)

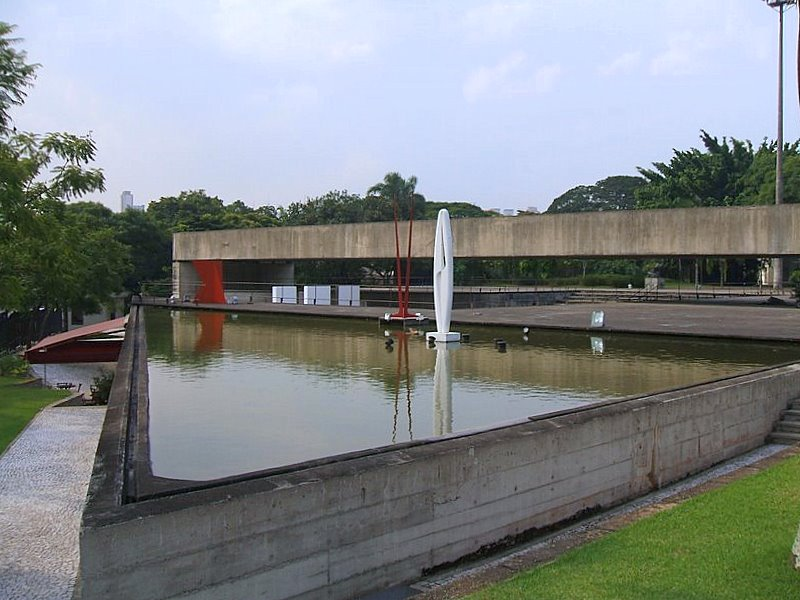
Brazilian Sculpture Museum, Mube, São Paulo (1988).

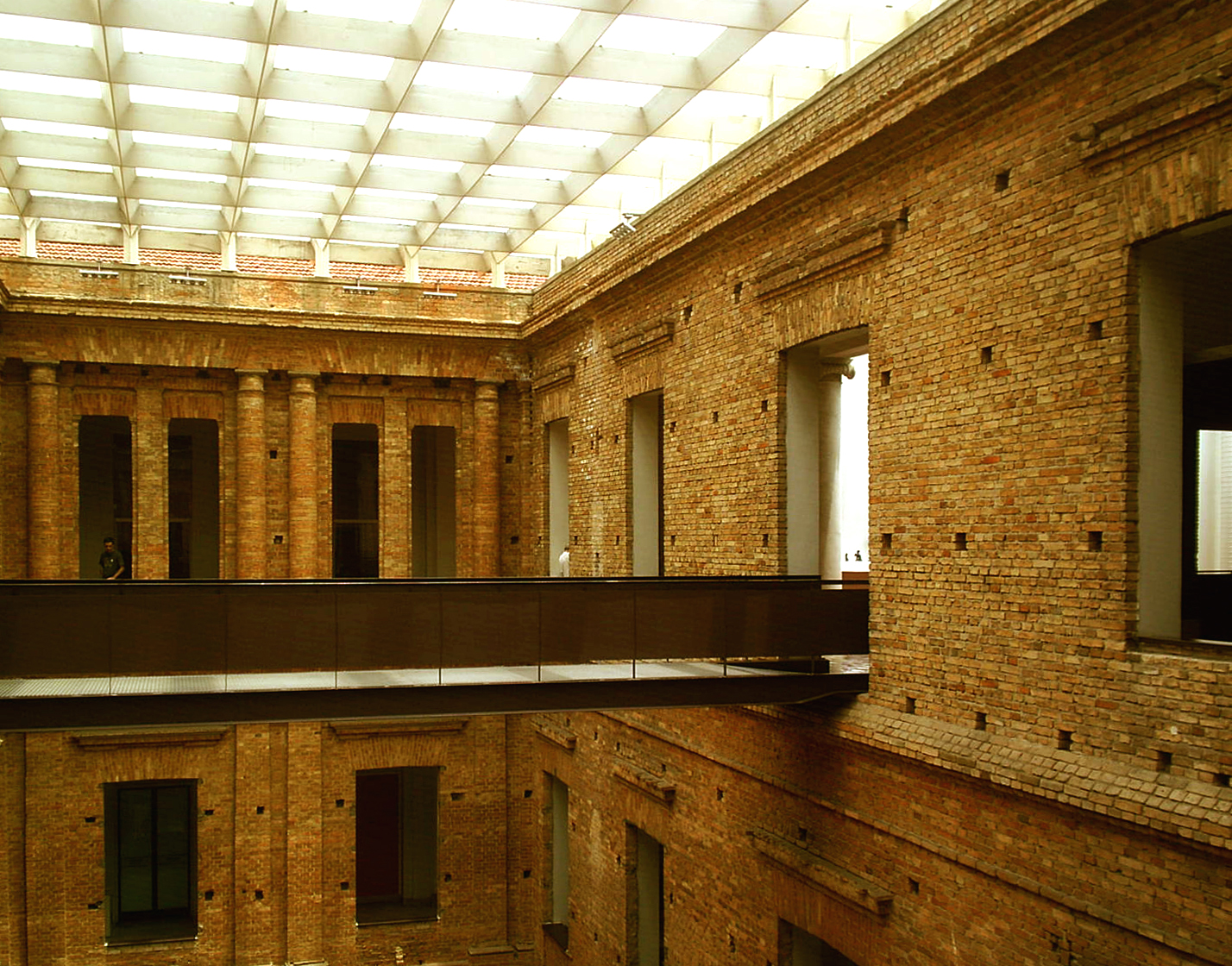
Pinacotheca, Pinacoteca do Estado, São Paulo (1993)
