= Belém Palace =

Official residence of the Portuguese president

National Palace of Belém
- Palácio Nacional de Belém
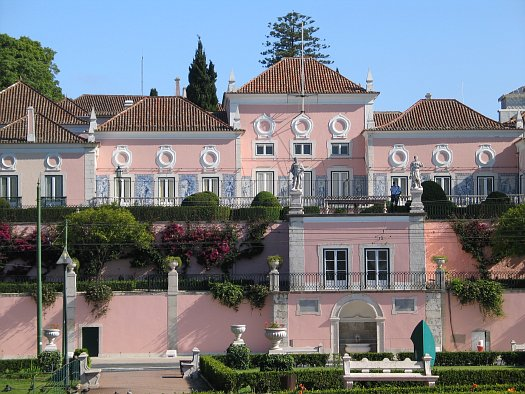
- The main façade of the Belém Palace from the Afonso de Albuquerque Square
- Former names: Royal Palace of Belém
- Alternative names: Belém Palace

General information
- Type: Official residence
- Architectural style: Mannerism
- Location: Santa Maria de Belém, Praça Afonso de Albuquerque, 1349-022, Lisbon, Portugal
- Coordinates: 38°41′52.69″N 9°12′2.47″W
- Current tenants: António José Seguro
- Opened: 18th century
- Owner: Portuguese government

Technical details
- Material: Mixed masonry

Design and construction
- Architect: João Pedro Ludovice
- Designations: National monument (August 3, 2007)
- Known for: Official residence of the president of Portugal

Website
- presidencia.pt

The Belém Palace, (Note: Portuguese: Palácio de Belém) officially the National Palace of Belém, (Note: Portuguese: Palácio Nacional de Belém) is the current official residence of the president of Portugal, the head of state of Portugal. Located in the Belém freguesia of Lisbon, the palace's main façade faces the Afonso de Albuquerque Square, facing the Tagus River. A former residence of the Portuguese royal family, the Belém Palace complex is made up of various buildings, wings, courtyards, and gardens, built variously from the 18th to 21st centuries.

== History ==
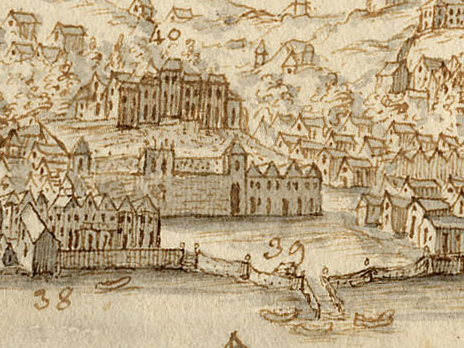
The Royal Quinta of Belém, 1736.

The site was originally part of the Outeiro das Vinhas, a property that fronted the beach of the Tagus River. D. Manuel of Portugal, a diplomat and poet who was the son of the 1st Count of Vimioso, acquired the land in 1559, naming it Quinta de Belém and constructing a building with three salons and two atria. By the mid-17th century the property was linked to a scion of the Royal Court, then transferred to the possession of the Counts of Aveiras and occupied by a convent.

The land was later acquired by King John V, who ordered its reconstruction in 1726. It encompassed two parcels, the Quinta de Baixo and Quinta do Meio, which the monarch purchased from João da Silva Telo, 3rd Count of Aveiros for 200,000 cruzados, in addition to the contiguous farmlands of the Counts of São Lourenço, with the objective of constructing a summer home. Although it is unclear when the first building was completed, by 1754 Queen Maria Anna of Austria had already died in the residence.

During the aftermath of the 1755 Lisbon earthquake, it was determined that there was superficial damage and no fear of collapse, but a number of repairs were completed between 1755 and 1756. Under supervision of the architect João Pedro Ludovice, the Casa Real de Campo de Belém (Belém Royal Country House) or Palácio das Leoneiras also received attention. Work included replacing tile and repairs to the greenhouses and stables. Similarly, around 1770, architect Mateus Vicente de Oliveira undertook reconstruction of the total estate. This was the beginning of several small projects within the residence that included the painting of the Sala das Bicas, the replacement of azulejo tiles along the southern veranda (1778), and construction of the birdhouses (1780). Initial construction of the Neoclassical horse training arena, designed by the Italian Giacomo Azzolini, began in 1828. The space is now occupied by the National Coach Museum

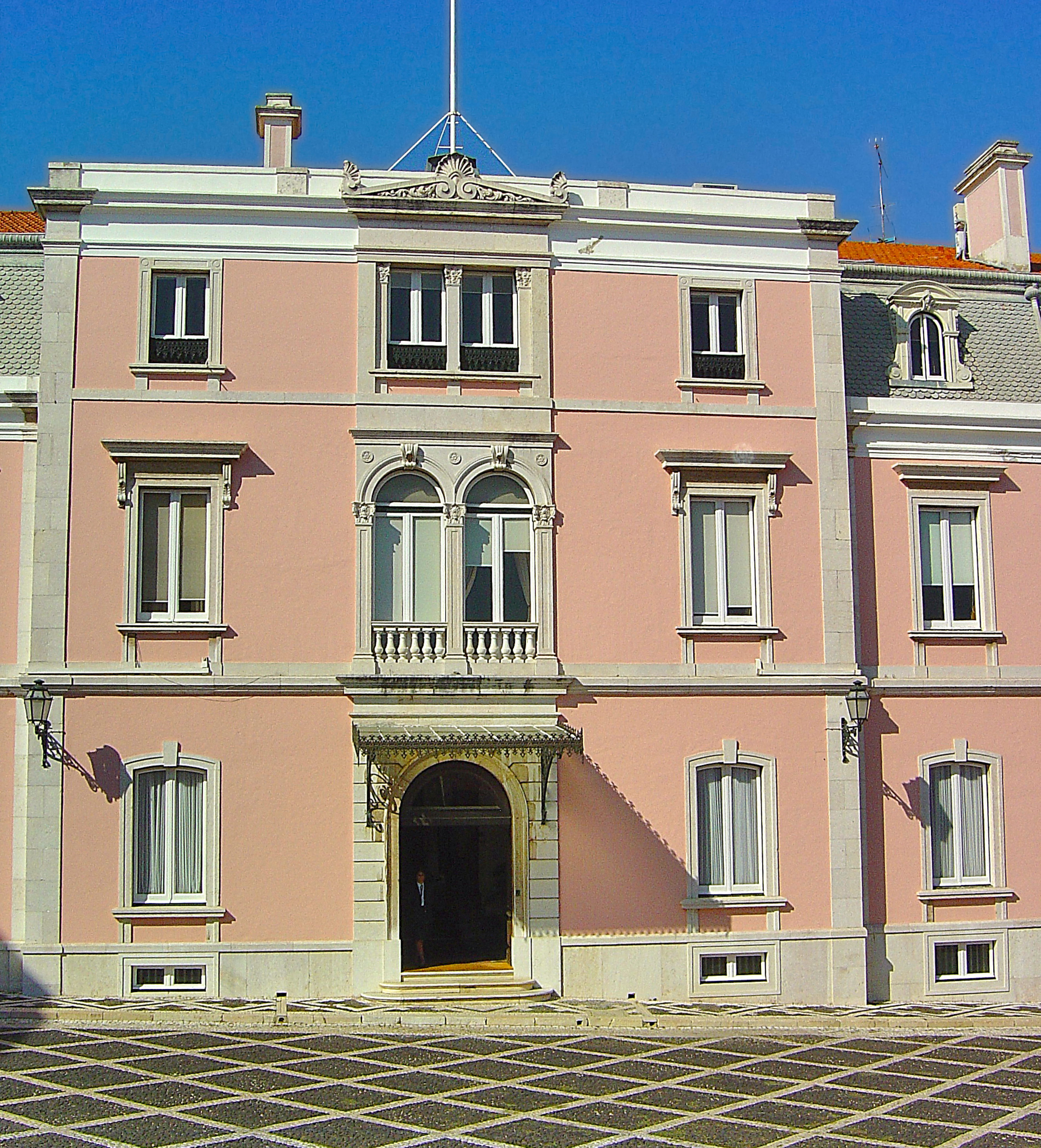
The Palecete built by King Carlos I on the "Noble Ladies' Courtyard".

After 1807, with the departure of the royal family for Brazil, the furniture and artwork were removed from the palace, and the building was abandoned until the end of the Liberal Wars.

By 1839, the palace was once again used to hold royal balls, and served as the temporary residence for visiting royal dignitaries. In 1840, during extensive renovations of the Palace of Necessidades, the royal family returned to Belém and resided in the palace during that decade. The Infanta Antónia was born there in 1845. By 1850, renovation of the grand ballroom was complete, permitting Queen Maria II to receive Portuguese society, and in September 1861, the Infanta was married there to Prince Leopold of Hohenzollern. In November 1861, the Infante Augusto died, followed by the Infante João on Christmas. A succession of deaths forced the royal family to abandon the palace, and it once again became a residence for visiting dignitaries. This change in purpose was accompanied by small repairs to the building, as well as the installation of gas lines and new lighting.

In 1886, after his marriage to Princess Amélie of Orléans, King Carlos ordered renovations of the palace to prepare it as the royal residence. These were completed under the direction of architect Rafael de Silva Castro; the interior was decorated by Leandro Braga, Columbano and João Vaz. The palace was the birthplace of the Prince Royal Luís Filipe in 1887 and Manuel in 1889.

Between 1902 and 1903, remodelling of the interior spaces was undertaken by Rosendo Carvalheira, with the additional construction of a visitors' house on the north walk of the Pátio das Damas to receive delegations of foreign dignitaries. This addition was inaugurated with the official visit of the King of Spain, Alfonso XIII, to Portugal at the end of 1903. The following year, the training stables were separated from the palace and destined to shelter the National Coach Museum.

By a royal decree published in the Diário do Governo (4 September), the palace ceased to operate as a royal residence, and passed to the Treasury for the "accommodation of heads of state, princes and foreign missions that come on an official visit to Lisbon, leaving for that purpose by the Ministry of Foreign Affairs".

=== Republic ===
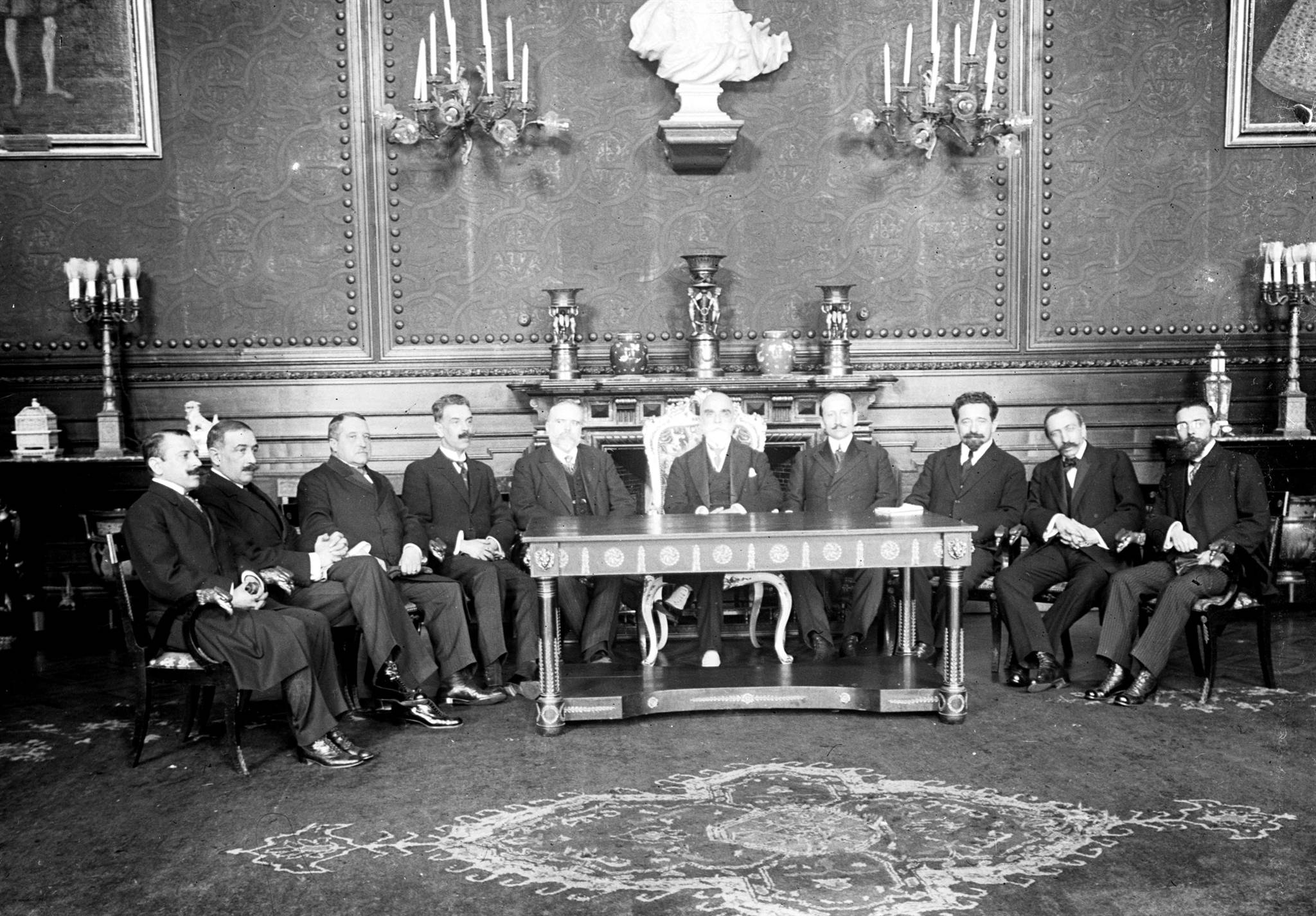
President Bernardino Machado receiving the Sacred Union Government in the Billiards Room, 1916.

Following the 5 October 1910 Revolution, the Secretaria-Geral da Presidência da República (Secretary-General of the Presidency) moved into the palace on 24 August 1911, as article 45 of the Constitution prohibited the chief of state from occupying a residence on properties held by the state. A loophole in the document allowed the authorization on 28 June 1912 of a government edict to rent an annex alongside the palace for 100,000 réis per month to house the first president, Manuel de Arriaga, who eventually preferred to live in his local residence and work at the palace. This policy of renting the space continued throughout the period of the First Republic.

After the assassination of President Sidónio Pais in 1918 at the Rossio railway station, the ex-president's body lay in state in the Sala Luís XV (Luís XV Hall) until his burial.

The official residency law for the president of the republic was promulgated on 24 March 1928. It specified that the president and his family would be permitted to reside in one of the national palaces. At the time of the promulgation, General Óscar Carmona decided to reside in the Citadel of Cascais, leaving the Palace of Belém for ceremonial affairs, official meetings, receptions and other formal occasions. In anticipation of the projected visit of the King of Spain, the palace underwent several renovations, although the visit did not materialize. In 1936, the main staircase was expanded by António Lino and finished by Luís Cristino da Silva.

During the term of General Francisco Craveiro Lopes (1951–1952) the Arrábida wing was remodelled to serve as the residence of the president of the republic.

In 1967, the property was finally classified as an IIP - Imóvel de Interesse Público (Property of Public Interest), by decree 47-508, published in the Diário do Governo on 24 January 1967. The palace was closed in 1969 to repair damage from the earthquake of that year.

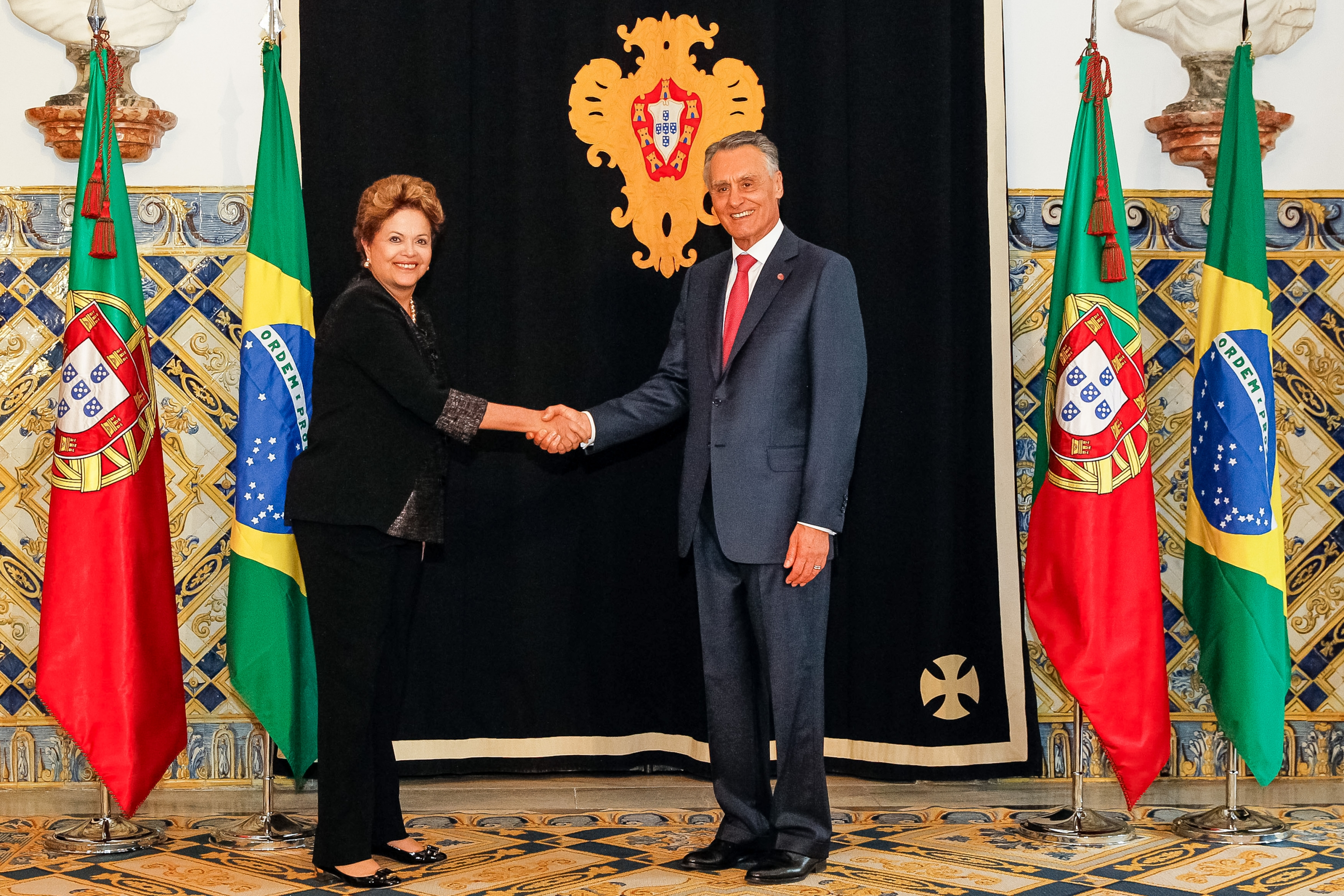
Former president Aníbal Cavaco Silva receiving Brazilian president Dilma Rousseff in the Sala das Bicas, 2013.

After the Carnation Revolution, the palace was made the headquarters of the Junta de Salvação Nacional (National Salvation Junta). It also experienced the traumas of the new democracy with the counter-revolutionary attempts by António Spínola and Francisco da Costa Gomes. As in previous administrations, Belém Palace underwent new renovations in the Arrábida wing in order to accommodate the demands of the president and his family. While some presidents resided in Belém, others such as Mário Soares, Jorge Sampaio, Aníbal Cavaco Silva and the current president, Marcelo Rebelo de Sousa, used it merely as a workplace, living in their private residences during their terms.

Between 1980 and 1985, the main dining hall was used to exhibit gifts received by the chief of state. In 1998, the construction of the Centro de Documentação e Informação (Documentation and Information Centre), was begun by architect João Luís Carrilho da Graça, the winner of a public competition promoted by the Secretary-General of the Presidency.

President Jorge Sampaio commissioned painter Paula Rego for a series of paintings to decorate the walls of the palace chapel in 2002. The painter eventually gave her works entitled "Ciclo da Vida da Virgem Maria e da Paixão de Jesus Cristo" (Cycle of Life of the Virgin Mary and the Passion of Jesus Christ". The early exhibitions and Presidential initiatives would lead to the inauguration on 5 October 2004 of the Presidential Museum (Portuguese: Museu da Presidência da República). Similarly, the King D. Luís I Painting Gallery was the setting for the 2005 exposition, Do Palácio de Belém, which presented the history of the palace and its architecture, as well as an overview of artistic works that have been displayed there.

On 10 March 2006, a Ministry of Culture dispatch reclassified the palace as a National Monument to include the palace, gardens, Museum of the Presidency and other annexes.

== Architecture ==
=== Exterior ===
The view of Belém Palace from Afonso de Albuquerque Square

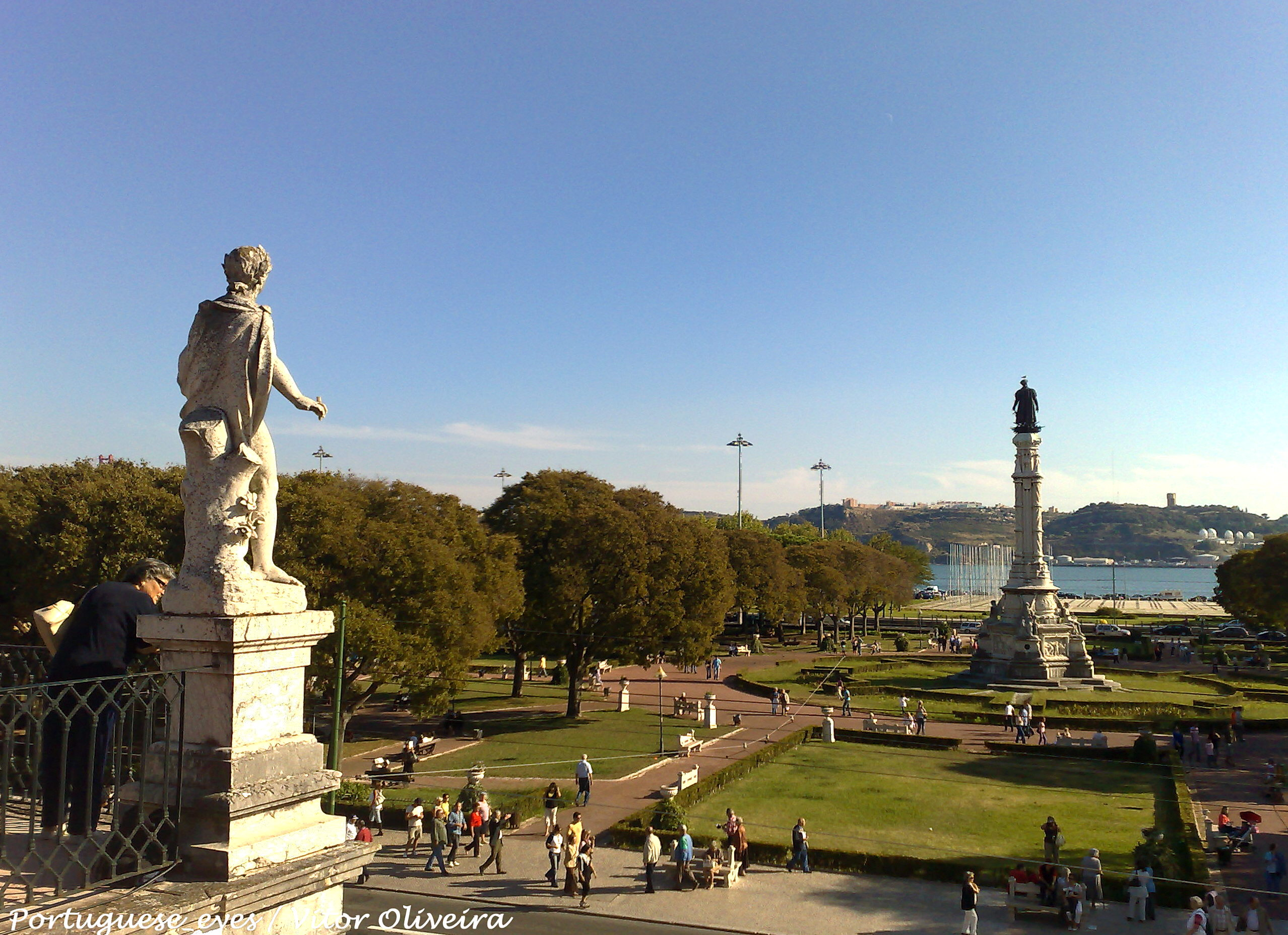
View from the Palace to Afonso de Albuquerque Square

Belém Palace is a "L" shape building, with the main space located in a rectangular three-volume space in the south façade. This front, which faces the formal gardens, presents a space of five bodies, flanked by wedges surmounted by pinnacles. A combination of Mannerist and Baroque styles, has a central body with floor level arcades, over a colonnade gallery surmounted by a triangular pediment decorated in stucco.

The two outside blocks are farther in front then the main building, forming a terrace delimited by balusters and accessible by lateral staircases. The top of these lateral walls are topped by twelve panels of monochromatic azulejo tile. On the veranda are 14 azulejo panels representing figures from mythology, with many showing the "Labours of Hercules", including "Plutão e Cérbero" (Pluto and Cerberus), "Vénus" (Venus), "Neptuno" (Neptune), "Hércules" (Hercules), "Hércules e a égua de Diómedes" (Hercules and the Mares of Diomedes), "Figura masculina" (Masculine figure), "Figura masculina com arco e flechas" (Masculine figure with bow and arrow), two panels of "Figura feminina" (Female figure), "Hércules e a ave de Estinfália" (Hercules and the Stymphalian birds), "Figura masculina com machado" (Masculine figure with hoe), "Hércules e a serpente de Ládon" (Hercules and the serpent Ladon), "Hércules e o touro de Creta" (Hercules and the Cretan Bull), "Hércules e a Hidra de Lerna" (Hercules and the Lernaean Hydra). There are also two rows of tiles with geometric patterns and acanthus leaves.

The eastern façade, which fronts the Pátio das Damas (Lady's Patio), features two levels of windows and portals. The western wing is served from the Pátio dos Bichos (Animals' Patio), where a gated entrance and ramp provides access to the principal staircase via an elevated space that overlooks the Jardim da Cascata (Falls Garden). The space was resurfaced and re-paved with stone at the beginning of the 21st century.

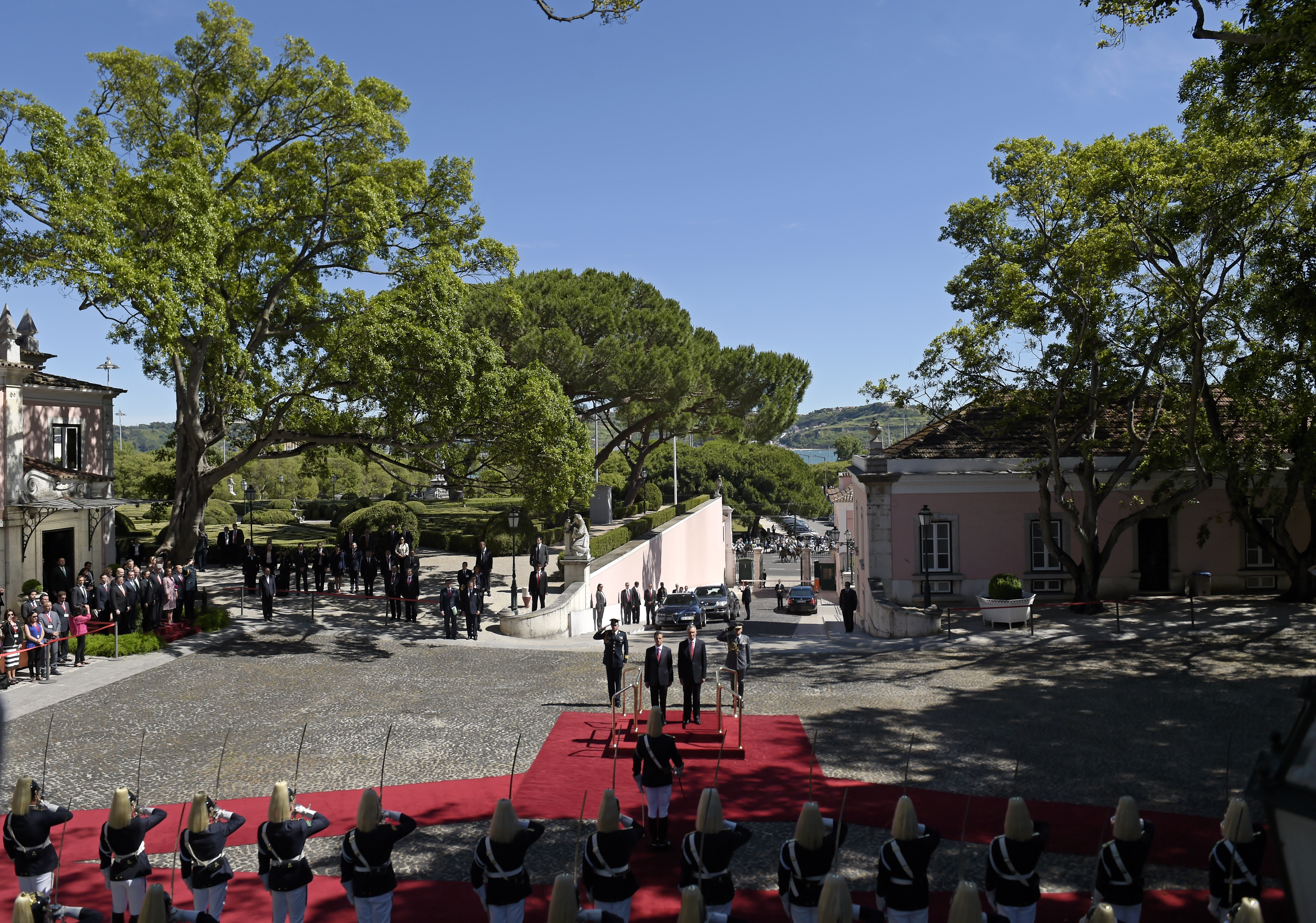
The Pátio dos Bichos, during a review of the Presidential Guard.

Immediately in front of the palace, fronting the Rua de Belém, are the formal gardens. Of an 18th-century design, they consist of a terrace enclosed by a balustrade adorned with statues and intersecting pattern of hedges around three circular ponds. In the Jardim da Cascata (in the northwest corner of the grounds) there are three pavilions (greenhouses) of capstone topped by a decorative railing, with vases and statues. Inserted within a rounded-arch is a waterfall featuring a statue of Hercules.

In the central pavilion are six azulejo panels forming a figurative composition, completed in the 19th century. The central composition is in black and white, while the trim is polychromatic: yellow, green and manganese plant ornamentation. These panels include: an "Outdoor Scene", "Two female figures and a male figure in the park, with fruit basket", "Standing female figure gives an apple to a male figure", a "Backgammon game", "Music in the Garden" and "Music in the Garden, with harpsichord and violin".

=== Interior ===
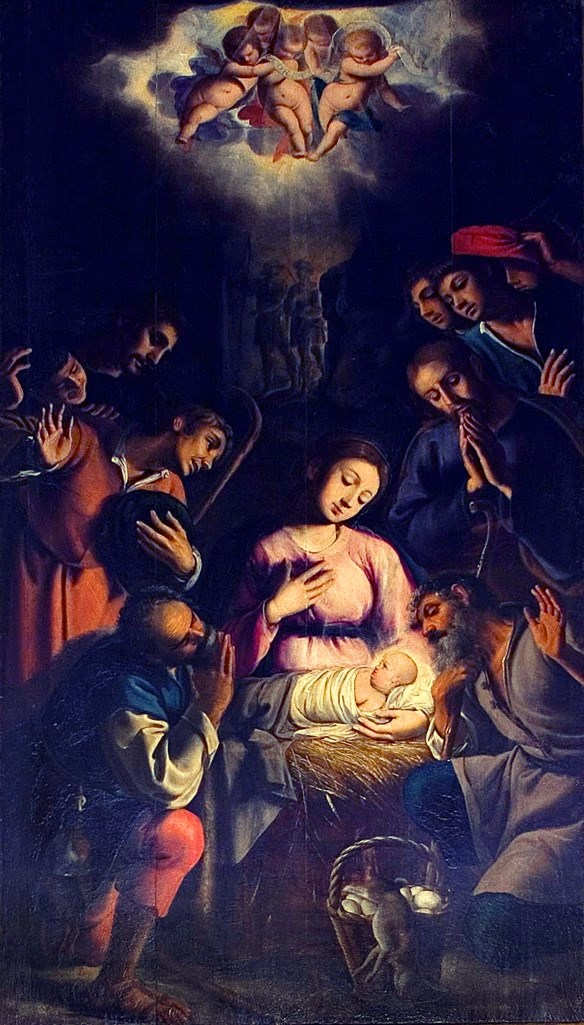
André Reinoso - The Adoration of the Shepherds (in the chapel)

The main space is highlighted by a linear sequence of rooms along the south elevation, dominated by the Sala das Bicas (Room of the Spouts), a grand vestibule paved in marble. The ceiling is panelled with an allegorical composition of carved flora and 18th-century polychromatic azulejo ashlars, completed in the last quarter of that century. In the space one can observe along one wall two round marble fountains with lion heads, which give the space its name. In addition, the space is surrounded by eight jasper busts on plinths, representing Roman emperors.

In the Sala Dourada or Salão de Baile (Golden Room or Ballroom, respectively) the ceiling is panelled with a central allegory of the Roman Empire, with murals and crown moulding medallions in a neo-Pompeian motif.

The Sala Luís XV (Louis Quinze Room), also panelled, is highlighted by a series of paintings surmounted by two shields of the Houses of Braganza and Orléans.

The narrow rectangular chapel, with smooth walls and wood panelling, is occupied by a Neoclassical retable in gold-leafed wood, with a painting by André Reinoso representing the "A Adoração dos Pastores" (The Adoration of the Shepherds). The vaulted ceiling is decorated with a profusion of decorative motifs in a "ferronneire" similar to those found in the Sala Dourada. On the walls are paintings by the artist Paula Rego, representing the "Ciclo da Vida da Virgem Maria e da Paixão de Jesus Cristo" (Circle of Life of the Virgin Mary and the Passion of Christ).

== Gallery ==
Front facade

Azulejo tiles on front facade

Gardens

Gardens

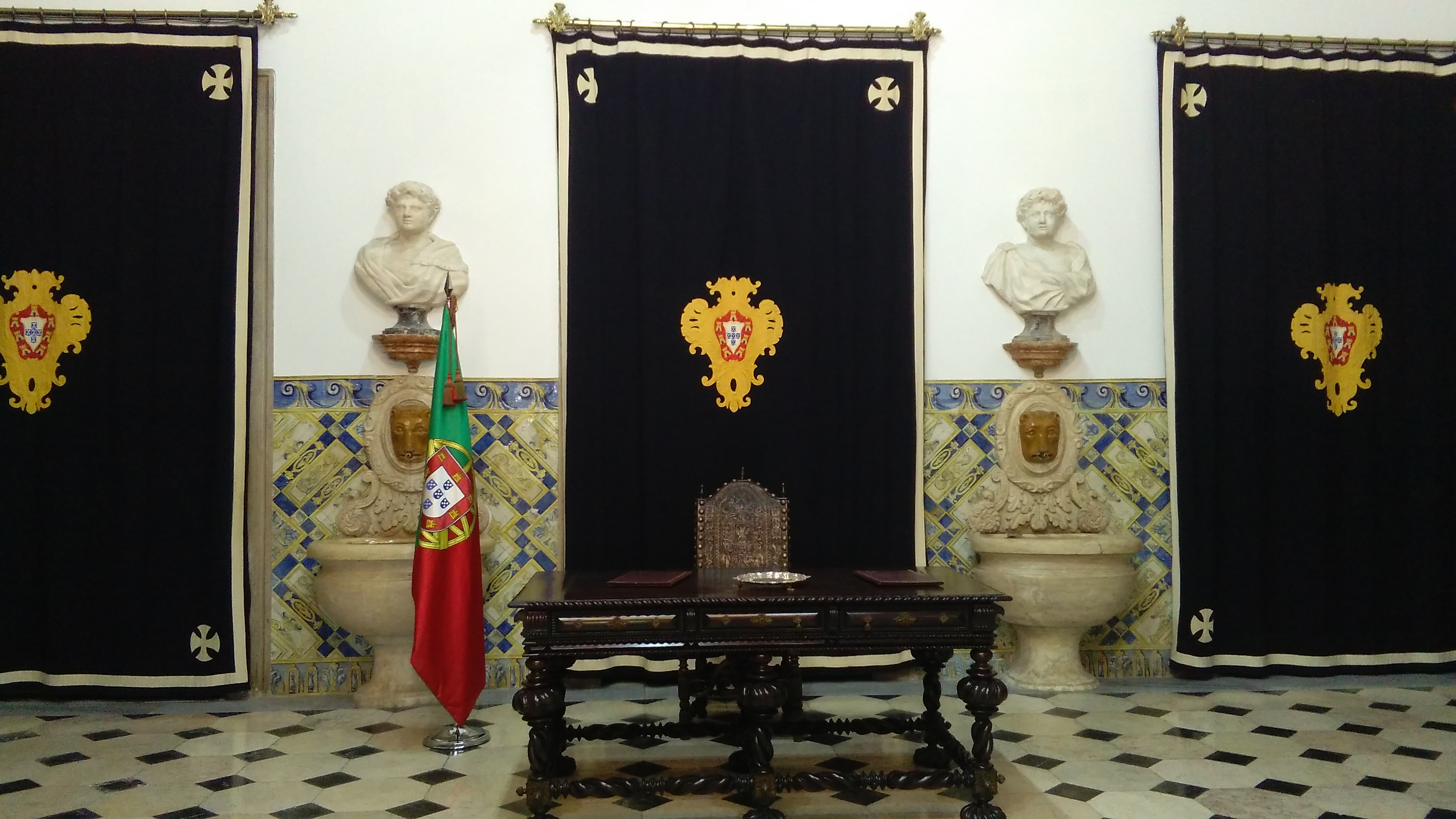
Water Spouts Room

Golden Room

Empire Room

Ambassadors' Room

Dining Room

Presidential office

Chapel
