= National Coach Museum =

Museum in Lisbon, Portugal

- Museu Nacional dos Coches
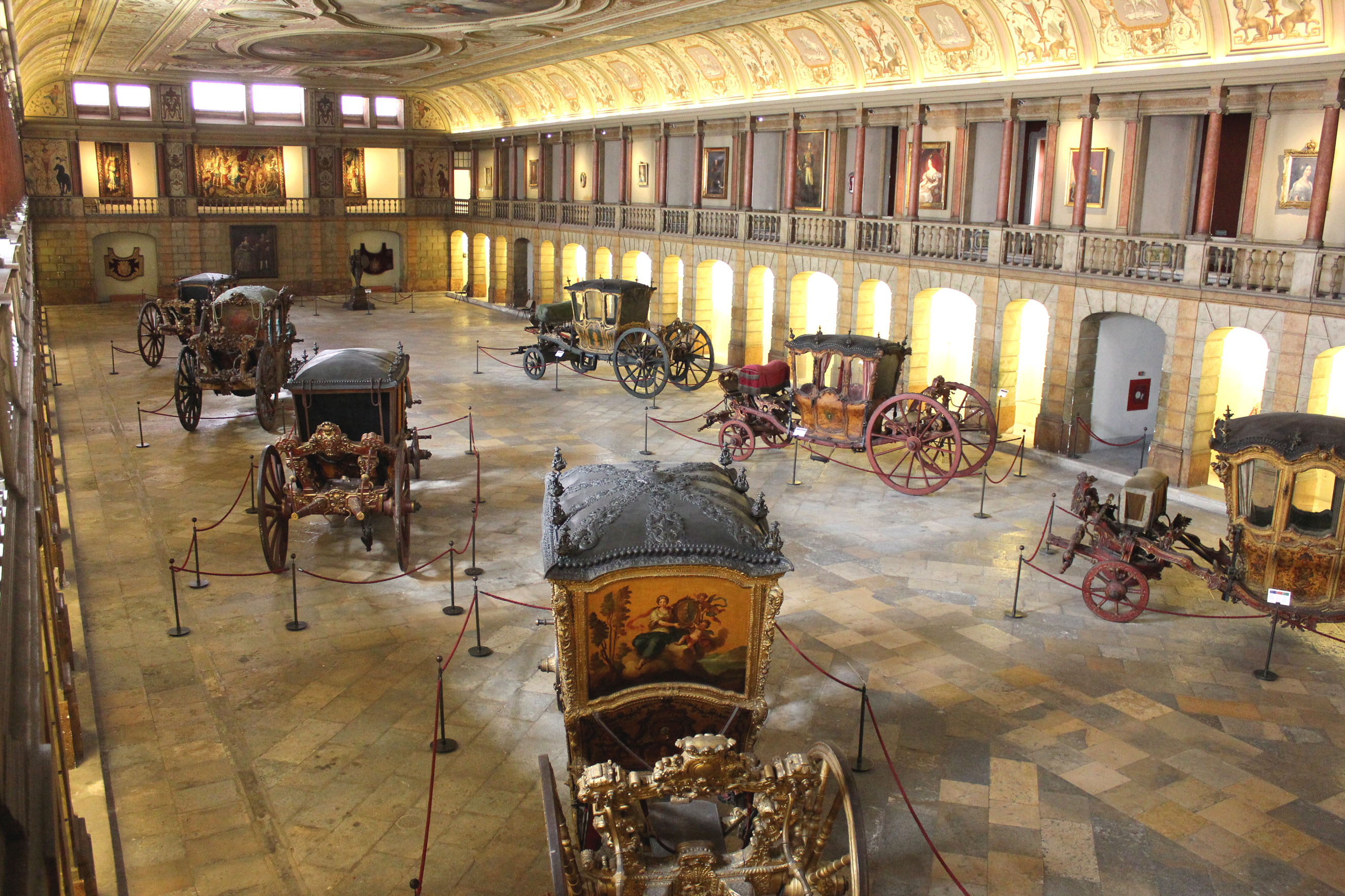
- Interior of the Royal Riding School
- Former names: Royal Coaches Museum; Coaches Reaes Museum
- Established: 23 May 1905; 121 years ago
- Location: Lisbon, Portugal
- Coordinates: 38°41′52″N 9°11′59″W
- Type: Transportation museum
- Website: www.museusemonumentos.pt/en/museus-e-monumentos/national-coach-museum

The National Coach Museum (Museu Nacional dos Coches) is located in Lisbon, Portugal. First established in 1905 as the Royal Coaches Museum (Coaches Reaes Museum), the museum houses historic horse-drawn coaches and carriages that belonged to the royal houses of Portugal from the 16th to the 19th century. The collection is housed across two buildings: the 1787 Royal Riding School of the Belém Palace in Afonso de Albuquerque Square, and a 2015 modern building opposite on Avenida da Índia. The collection comprises around 9,000 objects including ceremonial and gala vehicles and equestrian accessories.

It has been the most visited national museum in Portugal, with 382,593 visitors in 2016. The new building, which houses the majority of the collections, is a project by Paulo Mendes da Rocha in partnership with the Ricardo Bak Gordon studio and engineer Rui Furtado. Since 1 February 2025, Dr Rita Dargent has served as the director of the National Coach Museum.

== History ==
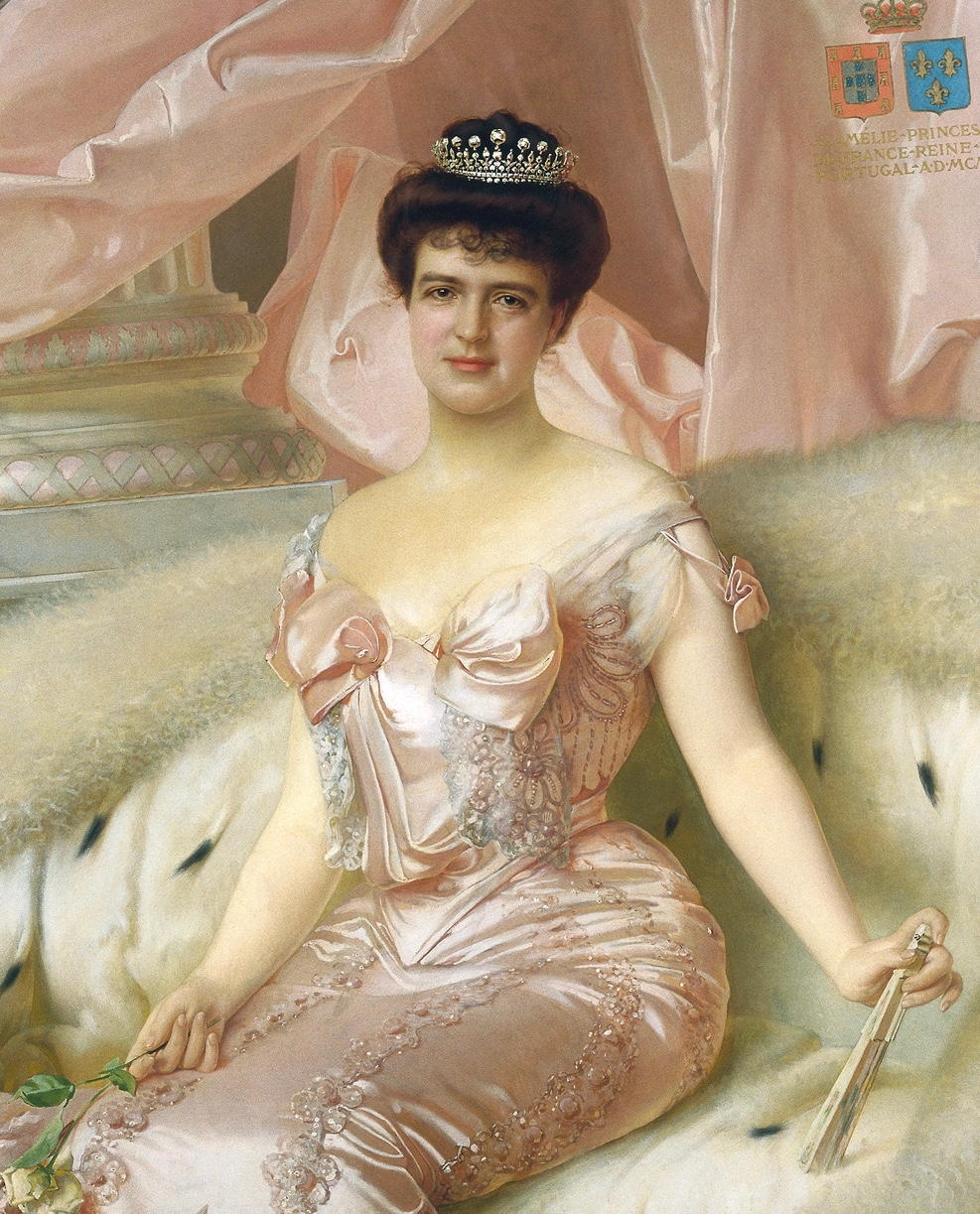
Portrait of Queen Amélia, founder of the museum, 1905, by Victor Corcos

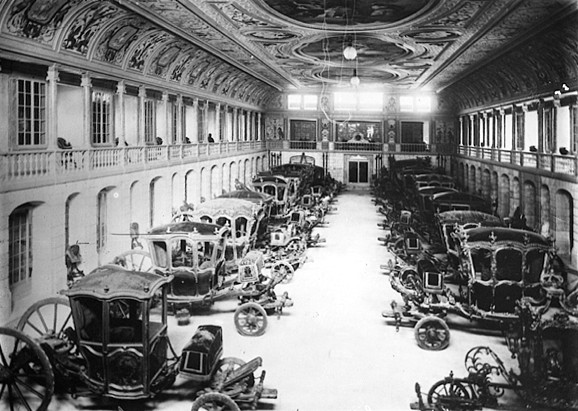
circa 1905–1910

The "National Coach Museum" was created on 23 May 1905, at the initiative of Queen Amélia of Orléans and Braganza, the wife of King Carlos I (1889–1908), with the aim of gathering, safeguarding, and presenting to the public an important collection of carriages belonging to the Royal House. The chosen location for the first coach museum in the world was the site of the former Royal Riding School, adapted for this purpose by the court architect, Rosendo Carvalheira, with the collaboration of painters José Malhoa and Conceição Silva. The success was significant, but the lack of space was immediately felt, which led the Queen herself to commission a new project the following year to expand the museum and display the remaining carriages of the Royal House stored in the stables of various palaces. After the establishment of the Republic on 5 October 1910, the museum's collection increased with the arrival of a set of coaches and landaus from the defunct Royal House and vehicles from church assets.

In 1911, the museum was renamed the National Coach Museum. Years later, in 1944, a new hall designed by architect Raul Lino was inaugurated by the then President of the Republic, Marshal Carmona. The tourist development and the consequent increase in visitors in the 1960s led to the creation of new services and support spaces, such as the Educational Service, the Temporary Exhibition Room, the Library, and the Shop. In 1983, the then Portuguese Institute of Cultural Heritage and the Braganza House Foundation established an agreement that granted the Museum an annex integrated into the Ducal Palace of Vila Viçosa for the exhibition of vehicles stored in the Palaces of Ajuda and Necessidades. In 1994, the Ministry of Culture acquired the former General Workshops of the Army in Belém for the construction of a new building for the Museum. In 2008, the Council of Ministers decided to proceed with the project to construct this building to bring together the entire collection of vehicles, and Brazilian architect Paulo Mendes da Rocha, Pritzker Prize winner in 2006, was invited to carry out the project. The foundation stone was laid on 1 February 2010.

On 23 May 2015, the majority of the collection was transferred to the newly built building, becoming an additional reason to visit this extraordinary collection. In memory of the first museum, a visitable exhibition core remains in the space of the Old Riding School, featuring coaches and landaus, the painting gallery of the royal family, as well as cavalry accessories. The National Coach Museum is currently divided between the new building in Belém and the old Riding School of the Royal Palace, both located in Praça Afonso de Albuquerque, Lisbon.

== Collection ==
The Museum houses a unique collection of ceremonial and state vehicles, as well as some travel and leisure carriages from the 16th to the 19th centuries, most of which come from the Portuguese Royal House. After the establishment of the Republic in 1910, vehicles from church properties and private collections were added. This excellent set of vehicles allows visitors to understand the technical and artistic evolution of animal-drawn transport used by European courts until the advent of the automobile. The collection includes coaches, landaus, carriages, sedans, baby carriages, litters, and chairs. Additionally, it features harnesses, vehicle accessories, uniforms, musical instruments, a collection of arms, and oil portraits of the monarchs of the House of Braganza.

When the Royal Coach Museum opened its doors in 1905, its collection consisted solely of pieces belonging to the Crown Jewels, gathered from various deposits, stables, and coach houses of the royal palaces of Belém, Ajuda, and Necessidades. Later, members of the Royal Family enriched the collection with objects related to the museum's theme, which were deposited indefinitely. Among these are some exotic harnesses, such as a Mexican hunting harness (in silver), two Algerian harnesses—gifted to Queen Amélia by Colonel Ben-Daoud—a gaucho saddle (Brazilian), a harness with silver applications given to King Carlos by the President of the State of Rio Grande do Sul, an Indian harness (Goa) offered in 1872 by the Hindu Chief of the Dempó family to Infante D. Augusto, son of D. Maria II, as well as Moroccan harness pieces gifted by Sultan Muley Hassam of Morocco to King D. Luís, along with Arab horses, in 1878.

In 1911, under the law of the Separation of Church and State, pieces from former convents and religious houses began to enter the Museum. Later, thanks to a policy of acquisitions and personal gifts, under the direction of Luciano Freire, the Museum gained a significant collection of drawings, engravings, and graphic materials, predominantly featuring studies and designs for vehicles. Simultaneously, in 1912, the first oil portraits of the Portuguese royal family were incorporated into the museum's collection—D. Catarina de Bragança, who married King Charles II of England, D. João V, D. Maria Ana of Austria, Prince D. José, and D. Maria I—originating from the Patriarchal Palace of S. Vicente de Fora, along with eight coaches and landaus from the former Patriarchs. In just two years, the royal series experienced significant growth, giving rise to the current portrait gallery of the Braganza dynasty, owners of some of the luxurious of the Marquis of Marialva, 18th Century.

An important section consists of uniforms and clothing accessories of high-ranking officials of the Court, the Royal Guard, and servants of the Royal House who participated in royal processions and ceremonies, most of which came from the Palace of Necessidades in 1913. This includes six tabards of the Kings of Arms and their respective collars bearing the arms of D. José, six solid silver maces of the Mace Bearers, twenty-two trumpets of the Royal Charamela, some with corresponding banners, sixteen halberds from the reigns of D. José, D. Maria I, and D. João VI, an ivory staff (a symbol of royal power) known as Negrinha, four skirts for timbales, a royal pavilion, and a covering with golden stars, as well as various accessories for heralding the horsemen.

Many other pieces have been added to the collection over the years through donations, acquisitions, or exchanges carried out by various directors. Moreover, policies for integrating museum institutions aimed at maintaining the uniformity and coherence of their collections led to the deposit of vehicles at the National Coach Museum that completed the collection with various types or vehicles with extraordinary histories, such as the Landau from the Regicide at the National Palace of Ajuda, field or hunting carriages from the Museum of Évora, or the Charabanc from the Ducal Palace of Vila Viçosa, as well as the Mail Coach from the Portuguese Communications Foundation, among others.

=== Carriage exhibits ===
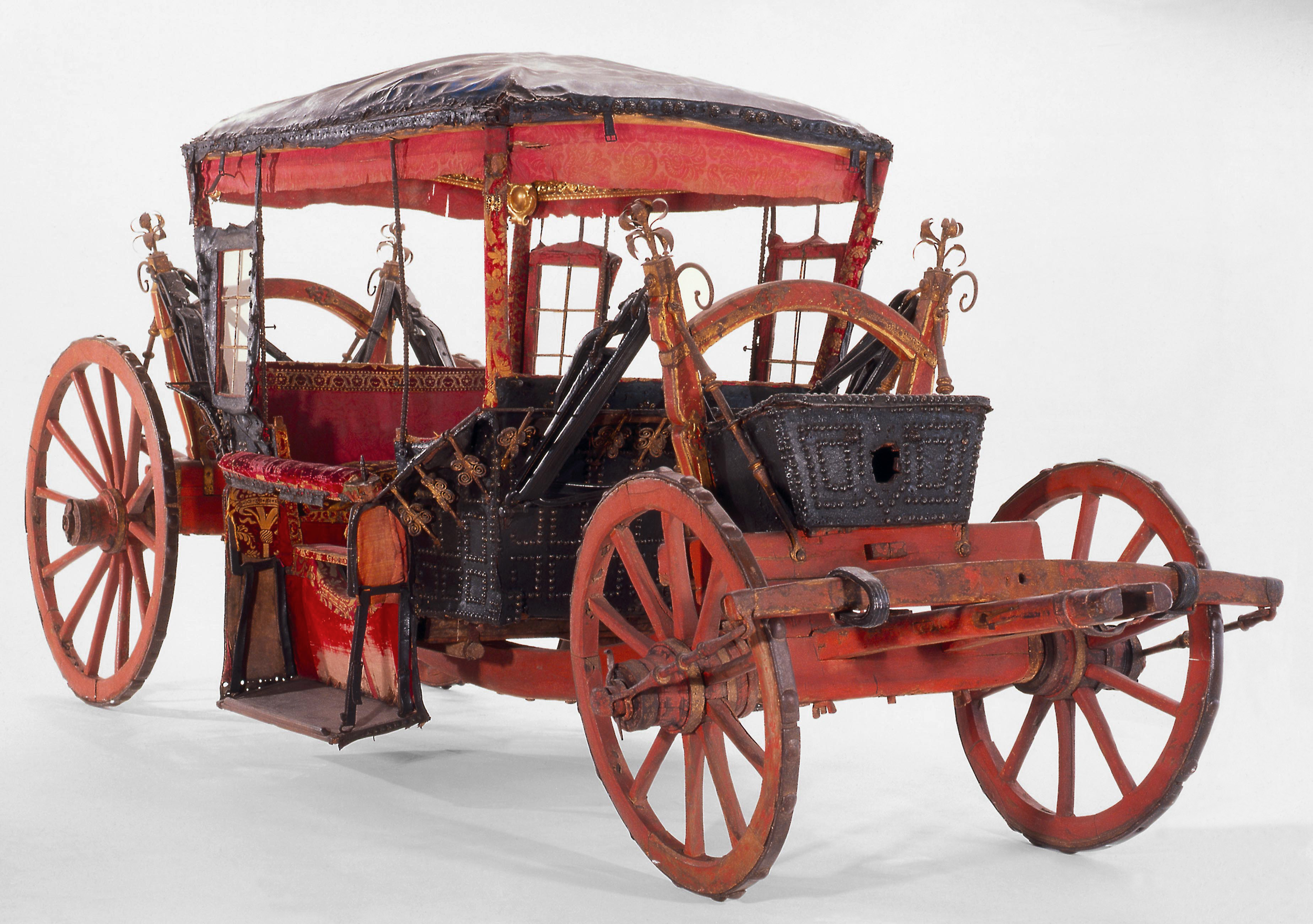
Carriage used by Philip II of Spain to visit Portugal, 16th–17th century

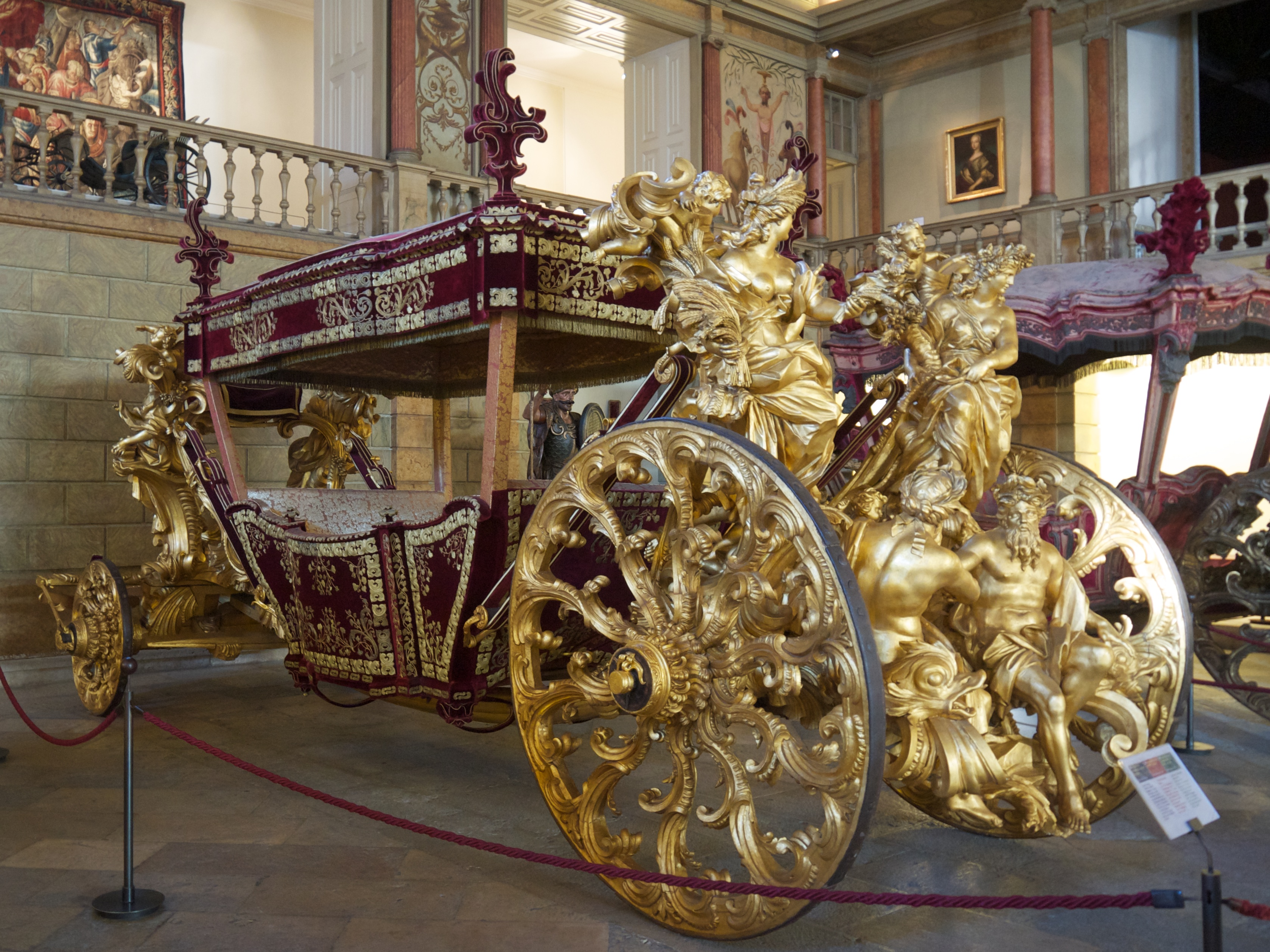
Carriage of the Oceans, used during the triumphant entrance to Rome by the Portuguese ambassador in 1716

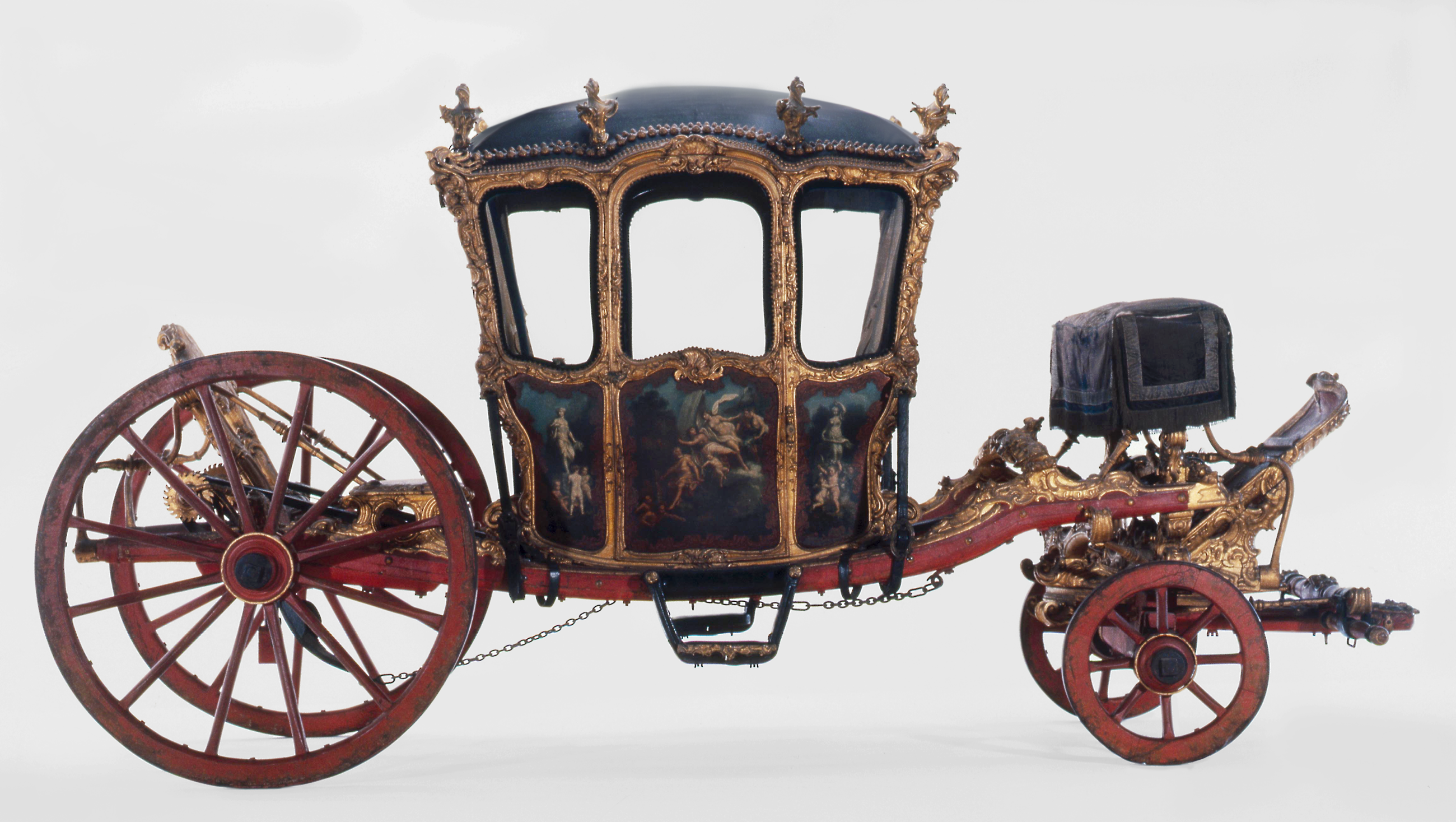
French berlinda

The collection of horse-drawn vehicles includes coaches, landaus, sedans, carriages, baby carriages, litters, chairs, phaetons, milords, victorias, child carriages, charabancs, hunting carriages, landaus, and urban vehicles such as clarences, broughams, coupes, dormeuses (bedlandas), breaks, caleches, and mail coaches.

- Older Carriages from the 16th to 17th Centuries – The museum houses some of the oldest coaches in the world. The term originates from the Hungarian city of Kocs, where the first models were manufactured and later exported to Italy, being adopted by all European courts. Among this period's exhibits at the National Coach Museum is the Coach of Philip II, which belonged to King Philip II (Philip III of Spain) and was used during his visit to Portugal in 1619. It is the oldest vehicle in the museum's collection.
- Symbols of Power – 18th Century – During the reign of D. João V, royal power reached its zenith. This ostentation is reflected in the decorations of the magnificent coaches used in grand ceremonies that impressed the public. The ceremonial vehicle commissioned by King D. João V for the Portuguese Royal House is a prime example from this period.
- Triumphal Carriages – 18th Century – Unique examples of Italian Baroque include three main coaches from the embassy of the Marquis of Fontes sent to Rome by D. João V to Pope Clement XI in 1716.
- Portuguese Baroque – 18th Century – In the vehicles from this period, the gilded carving and the paintings of the boxes reveal harmonious compositions of sacred and profane themes. The decoration of D. José's Coach exemplifies the exuberance of the Baroque style in Portugal.
- Marriage Exchange – 18th Century – The ceremony of the double wedding held at the Caia border between a prince of Portugal and a Spanish Infanta and between a prince of Spain and a Portuguese Infanta marked the restoration of good diplomatic relations between the two countries since the Restoration of independence in 1640. Evidence of this grand event includes the coaches and landaus that participated in this journey.
- Landaulets of the 18th and 19th Centuries – This model of vehicle originated in Berlin in the second half of the 17th century. It is distinguished from the coach by its type of suspension. The body is no longer suspended and rests on two strong leather straps, providing greater stability and making journeys more comfortable.
- Ecclesiastical Vehicles – Members of the high clergy held a status equivalent to that of the nobility and had their own vehicles identified by prelatical coats of arms. In certain ceremonies, religious images were transported in processional landaulets.

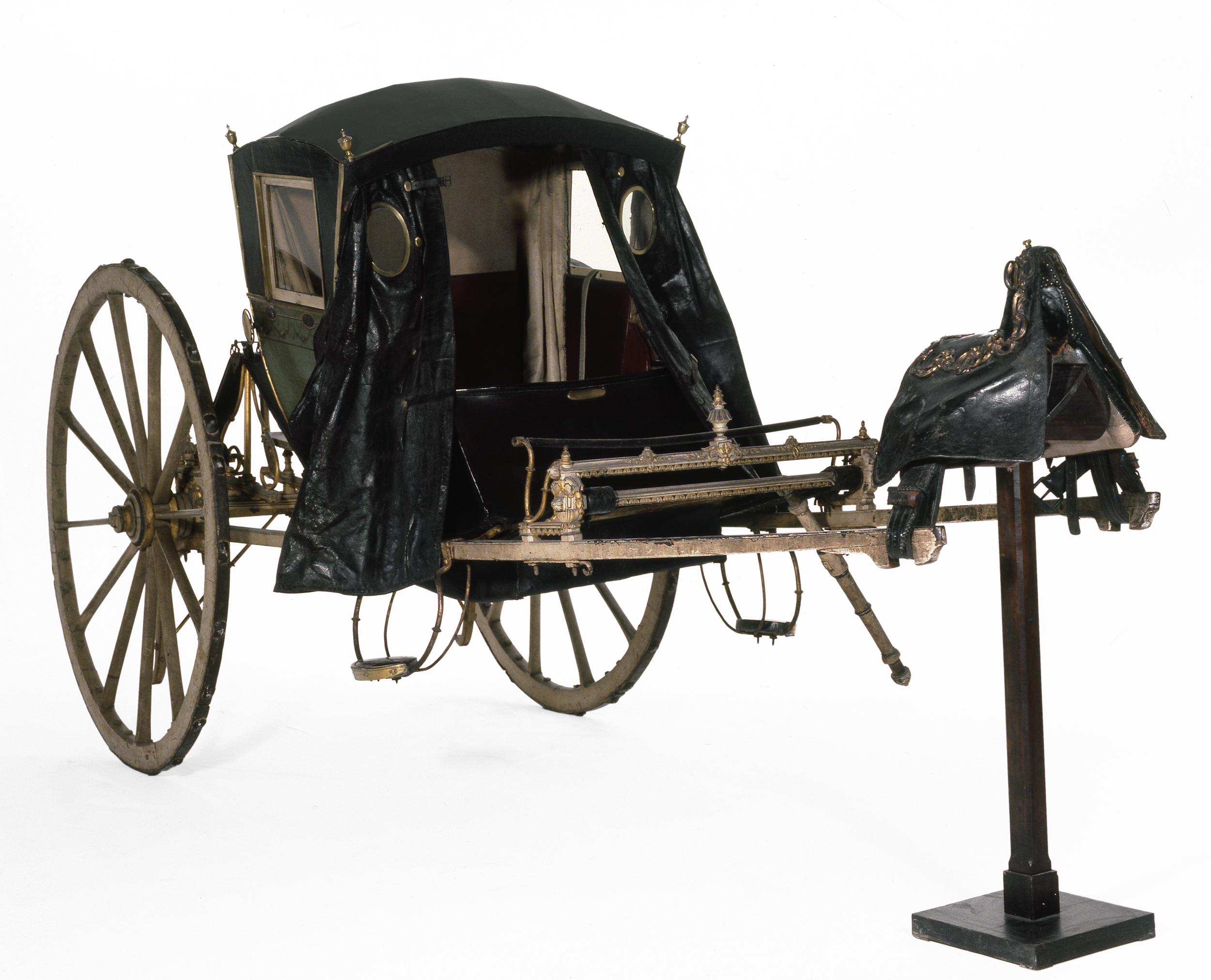
Glasses sedge

- Sedges of the 18th Century – Sedges were vehicles pulled by one or two horses, very discreet and practical for daily use. They could be driven by the passenger themselves or by a coachman, a man riding alongside the sedge holding the reins. They were the first rental cars in Lisbon. An example is the "Sedge dos Óculos" (Portuguese).
- Pleasure Carriages of the 18th Century – Built during the time of D. Maria I, these light cars, decorated in rocaille style, were pulled by a single horse and used by the Royal Family for outings in the gardens and parks of the palaces.
- Litters and Chairs – Litters were used in Europe from Roman times until the 19th century, as they were easy to maneuver on paths where other vehicles could not travel. Chairs were used mainly in the narrow streets of cities for transporting noblewomen, the sick, or clergy members.
- Pleasure Carriages of the 19th Century – These open-bodied cars, with simple lines and covered in black leather, were used for outdoor outings in the countryside or city. The victorias and phaetons are models that could be driven by the passenger themselves.

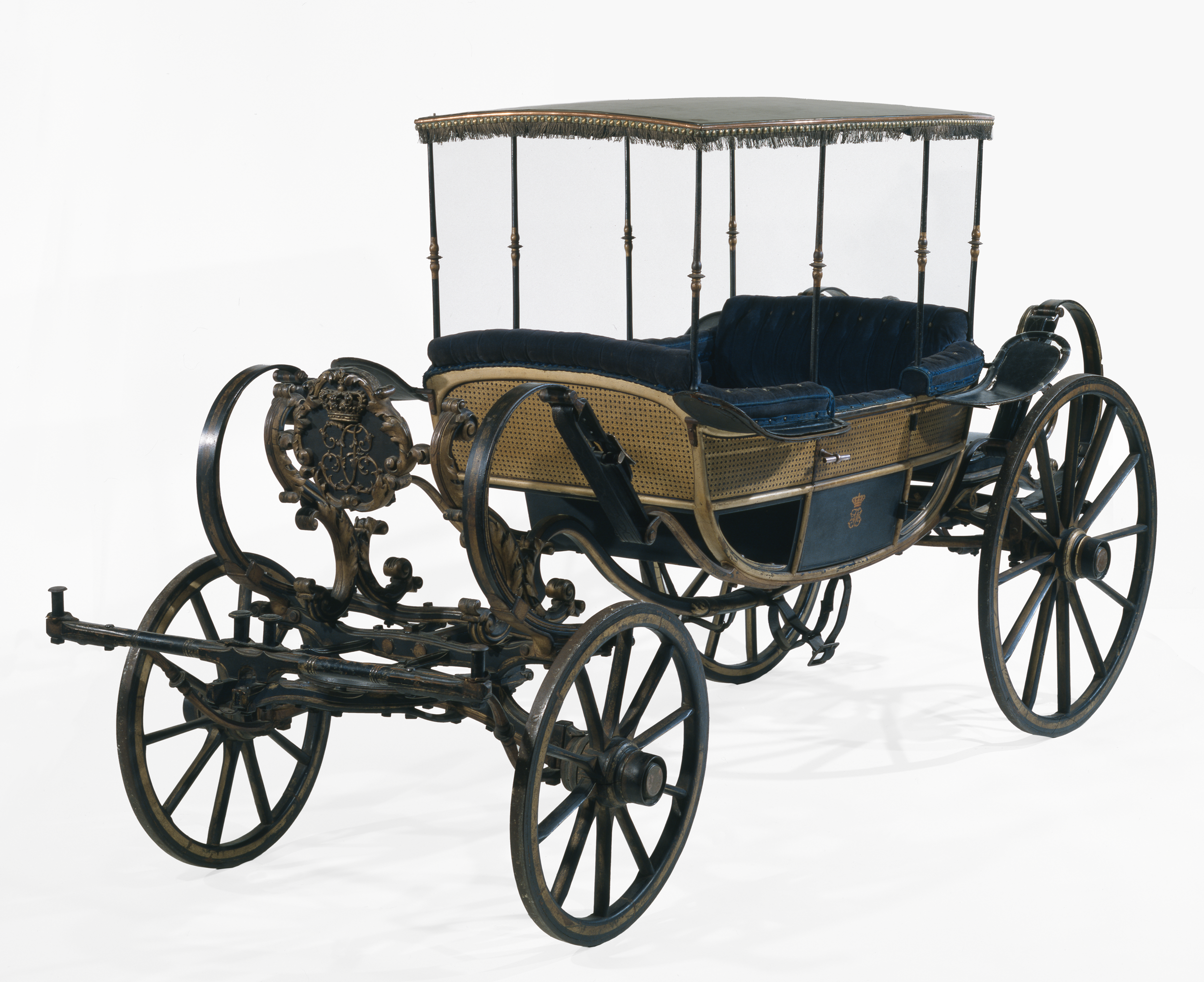
Child's carriage of Prince Carlos I of Portugal

- Children's Carriages – Small-sized carriages made to resemble adult cars, allowing young princes and princesses to ride in parks and gardens. They could be pulled by ponies or sheep.
- Hunting Carriages – Hunting has always been one of the great pastimes of the nobility. In the 19th century, charabancs were used to transport hunters and their companions to the hunting grounds. Ladies could sit in these cars to watch the hunts from elevated positions.
- Gala Carriages – These ceremonial vehicles were used by the Royal Family and nobility during gala events such as coronations, public entrances, wedding parades, and baptisms, as well as in religious ceremonies.
- Urban Vehicles – In the 19th century, various models of closed or open cars emerged for use in cities. They featured innovative technical characteristics that facilitated driving and provided greater safety and comfort for passengers. This was also the time when integrated braking systems, rubber tires, fenders, different types of shock-absorbing springs, and bells were introduced.
- Mail Coaches – These vehicles appeared in the late 18th century to carry mail. They were very robust vehicles pulled by two or more teams and became the first public transport between towns and cities. They carried passengers and luggage inside and on the roof. With the advent of the train, some of these vehicles lost their utility and were acquired by noble families for outings and hunting.

=== Other exhibits ===
The museum has various collections of items related to the operation of the carriages and the court.

- Equestrian tack: This collection highlights accessories for cavalry and equestrian games, with a particular focus on the Estafermo, a type of harness used in equestrian competitions.
- Vehicle accessories: Includes items such as a camp bed and accessories for changing wheels, essential for the proper functioning of the vehicles.
- Livery uniforms: This collection contains the uniforms of the court's crews, reflecting the attire used in official events.
- Armory: Comprises weapon cases, swords, sabers, and halberds, representing the military and ceremonial heritage of the nobility.
- Musical instruments of the Royal Charamela (18th Century): Includes a collection of silver trumpets adorned with the royal arms of D. José, D. Maria I, and D. Pedro III, as well as timbales skirts and music books for Rimpiano, Timpano, and Clarim.
- Documentary collection: Encompasses architectural drawings, decoration project drawings for carriages, engravings and prints, photographs, and postcards, including a copper engraving of the 1st Carriage of the Embassy of Melo e Castro.
- Historical documentary collection: Includes objects belonging to the Royal House, which were donated or are part of the Ancient Fund, such as oil portraits of the monarchs of the House of Braganza and the royal family, landscape paintings with iconography of vehicles in court processions, the mantle of Queen D. Amélia of Bragança, classified as a national heritage item, tapestries from the Royal Manufacturing Workshop of Aubusson, and antique furniture from the museum. These collections contribute to a deeper understanding of the history and culture associated with royal vehicles and the Portuguese court.

== Architecture ==
=== Royal Riding School ===
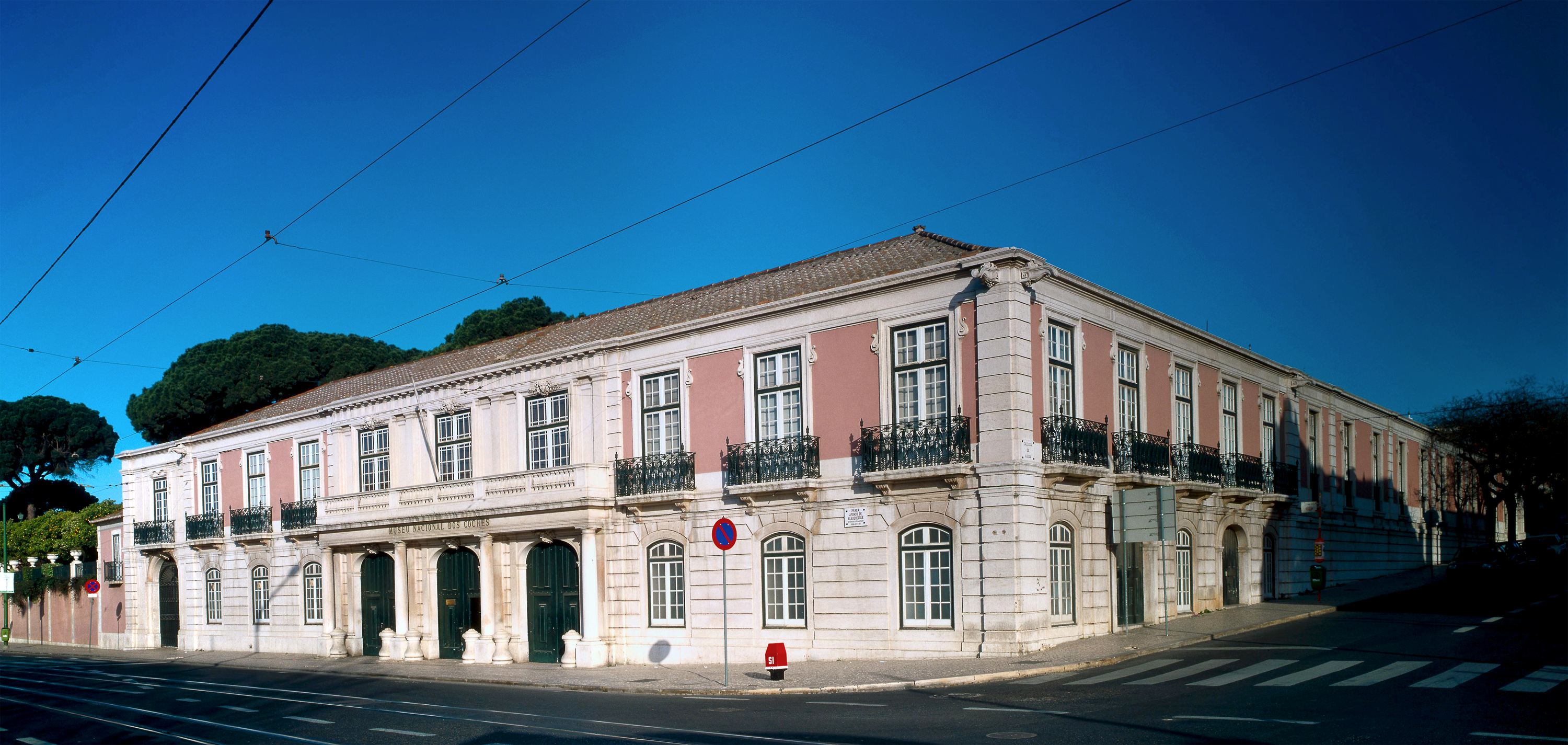
Exterior, Royal Riding School, National Coach Museum

In 1726, King John V purchased the "Quinta de Baixo," located by the Tagus River in the pleasant area of Belém, in the western part of Lisbon, where several noble houses existed, including the Palace of Belém and a Riding School. Sixty years later, the original Riding School was destroyed, and the current one was erected the following year by the initiative of Prince John, future King John VI, a great enthusiast of equestrian art. This neoclassical project, attributed to the Italian architect Giacomo Azzolini, features a main hall (51m x 17m) with two floors, which has two narrow galleries with colonnades topped by two tribunes at the upper ends, where the Royal Family and Court once watched equestrian games. Between 1792 and 1799, several painters contributed to the decoration of the interior of the Old Riding School, including Francisco de Setúbal, Francisco José de Oliveira, Joaquim Lopes, known as "the Bugre," and the French artist Nicolau Delerive. The ornamental motifs used in the decoration of the ceiling and panels at both ends of the hall predominantly feature elements related to equestrian art. The ceiling boasts three large oval medallions depicting allegorical scenes.

In 1904, during the adaptation of the Riding School into a museum, renovations were carried out under the guidance of Rosendo Carvalheira, the architect of the Royal Palaces, with the paintings restored by artists José Malhoa and António Conceição e Silva. On 23 May 1905, the "Royal Coach Museum" was opened to the public in Lisbon, initiated by Queen Amélia d’Orléans and Bragança. Years later, in 1940, a new campaign led by architect Raul Lino allowed for the expansion of the exhibition area with the construction of a new side hall, although space constraints were still felt. To address this issue, the Secretary of State for Culture acquired the former General Workshops of the Army in Belém in 1994 with the intention of building a new building for the National Coach Museum. Currently, the space of the Old Riding School houses a visitable area with coaches and berlindas, a gallery of paintings of the royal family, and a collection of equestrian accessories.

=== New National Coach Museum ===
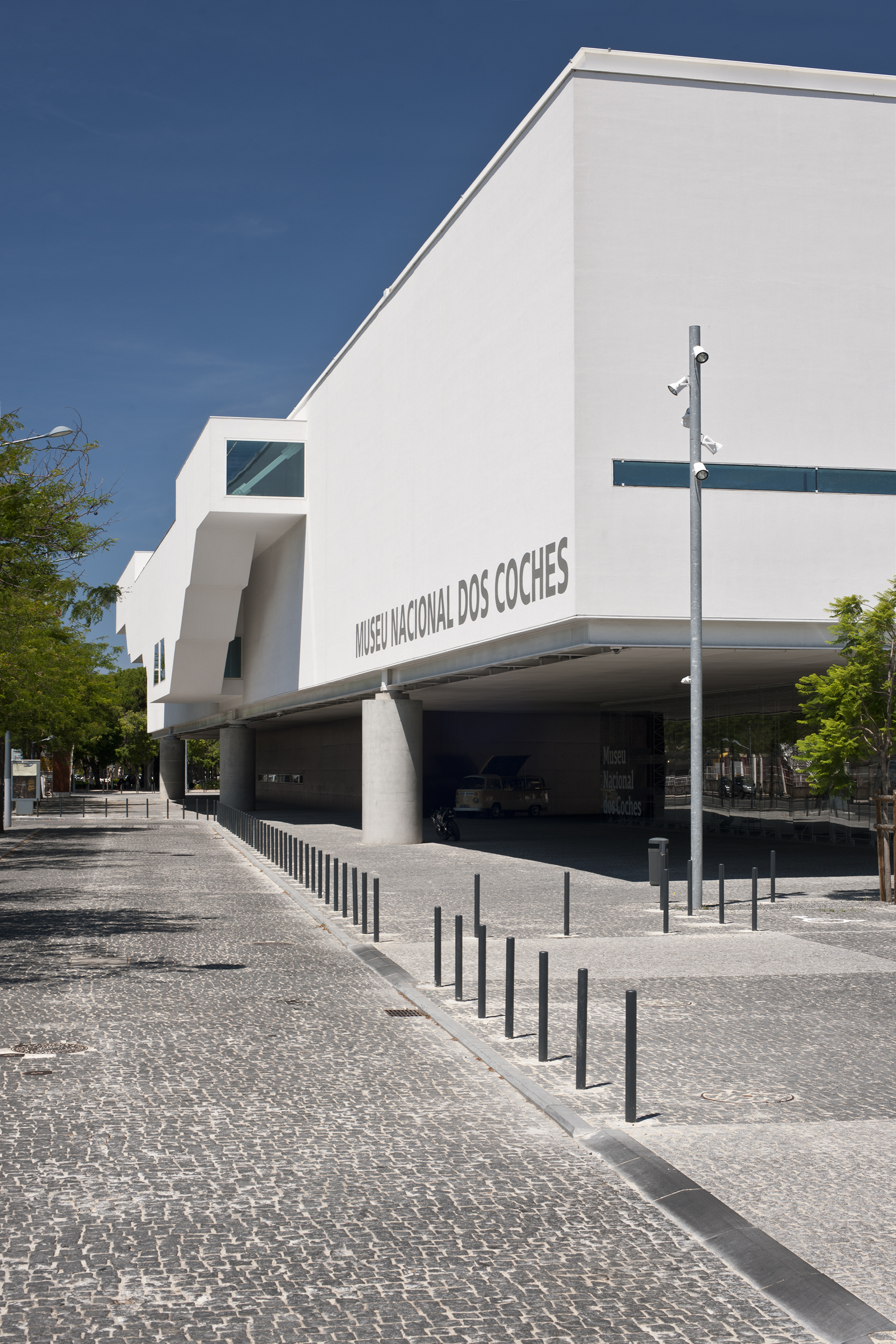
The new National Coach Museum

The project for the new building of the National Coach Museum was launched in 2008 to coincide with the inauguration and the celebrations of the Centenary of the Republic in 2010. With the first stone laid on 1 February 2010, and inaugurated on 23 May 2015, the project was signed by Brazilian architect Paulo Mendes da Rocha (Pritzker Prize 2006) in consortium with Portuguese architect Ricardo Bak Gordon and engineer Rui Furtado. Despite the beauty and charm of the Royal Riding School of Belém, the need to increase the exhibition area of the museum and to create new technical infrastructures and support services was always pressing. Thus, after 110 years of operation in the Old Riding School, the museum moved to an area where the old General Army Workshops used to be located.

The building of the Coach Museum emerged in Belém as a cultural facility but also as a public place (Bak Gordon). In the words of Paulo Mendes da Rocha, "the museum has no door and relates to all sides"; the true project is not the museum building itself, but the fact that it, through the "annex," stitches the fabric of the city and highlights the "pavilion" as a great treasure (a parallelepiped measuring 132m x 48m x 12m, elevated off the ground by 14 circular pillars).

With a gross area of 15,177m², the new construction houses two interconnected buildings via an aerial walkway: the "Exhibition Pavilion" and the "Annex Building." The "Exhibition Pavilion," located on the first floor, consists of two large side galleries that house the permanent exhibition and a central nave intended for various functionalities; devoid of any decoration, it features a high ceiling, a continuous floor of polished concrete, and white walls punctually interrupted by openings or display cases.

The "Annex Building" includes an administrative area, a dining area, and an auditorium. For the New Building, spaces were designed for exhibitions, a conservation workshop and reserves, a library, an area for educational services, an auditorium, a shop, a dining area, and the Museum Square: a freely accessible space that also serves as a public promenade and leisure area. A pedestrian and cycle-friendly path is also highlighted, which runs along the facade facing Jardim Afonso de Albuquerque, from Rua da Junqueira to the Belém river station (completion expected in 2018).
