= Afonso de Albuquerque Square =

Square in Lisbon, Portugal

Coordinates: 38°41′47.84″N 9°12′1.25″W

The Albuquerque monument in front of the Belém Palace

Afonso de Albuquerque Square (Portuguese: Praça Afonso de Albuquerque) is a public square in the Belém district of the city of Lisbon, Portugal.

== History ==
The square is located in front of Belém Palace, an early 18th-century palace that nowadays serves as residence for the President of Portugal. The square is named after the Second Governor of Portuguese India Afonso de Albuquerque, and offers views of Belém Palace. It has a monument, in neo-Manueline style, by artists Silva Pinto and Costa Mota tio, inaugurated in 1902. The monument carries a bronze statue of Afonso de Albuquerque and has reliefs about his life.

The site of the square used to be a harbour, built in 1753. In 1807, Queen Mary I, Prince John VI and the royal family fled Lisbon from this harbour to Rio de Janeiro, in Brazil, to escape the Napoleonic troops which had invaded Portugal.

Notable buildings include Belém Palace and the Nacional Coach Museum.
