= SAPO Codebits =

Lisbon computing conference held 2007–2014

Codebits logo in 2009.

SAPO Codebits, also known simply as Codebits, was a conference held in Lisbon from 2007 to 2014, focused on computing and light-hearted geek culture content for a highly technical audience. It was organized by SAPO which, besides a news media brand, was also an internet-focused R&D division of Portugal Telecom at the time.

Codebits logo in 2014, when SAPO's "frog" logo got replaced by the event's mascot.

Codebits had a 48-hour hackathon at its core, but the number of talks and entertainment activities increased steadily over the years, along with the number of seats, attracting an increasing number of international attendees and speakers. At this point it was as much of a festival as it was a conference.

In 2016, Codebits was rebooted outside SAPO under the name Pixels Camp.

In 2015, Portugal Telecom was acquired by Altice, SAPO's mission changed, and Codebits was discontinued after seven editions. In 2016, the Codebits format was revived outside SAPO under the name Pixels Camp. Pixels Camp ran for three more editions until the onset of the COVID-19 pandemic.

== Format ==
Initially inspired by Yahoo! Hack Day, Codebits lasted for three non-stop days and nights, with many participants choosing to eat and sleep on site. Its core was a 48-hour hackathon but also included dozens of talks during the day, as well as several entertainment activities in the evenings.

Codebits was free for all participants, including plenty of food and drinks. Active recruiting inside the premises was disallowed, and there were little commercial undertones apart from a few product announcements during the opening keynotes.

The number of seats was limited and potential attendees had to undergo a short screening process in order to secure a ticket. The screening was meant to ensure that most, if not all, attendees had a suitable technical background or creative skills related to the event's theme. Applicants such as those in marketing and recruiting were usually rejected.

Codebits always opened on a Thursday and had its first morning composed of general keynotes from the organizing company and its partners/sponsors, plus general information about the hackathon and satellite activities. The hackathon began in that same afternoon and ended on Saturday morning, with that day's afternoon reserved for project presentations, voting, and the event's closing ceremony.

=== 48-hour Hackathon ===
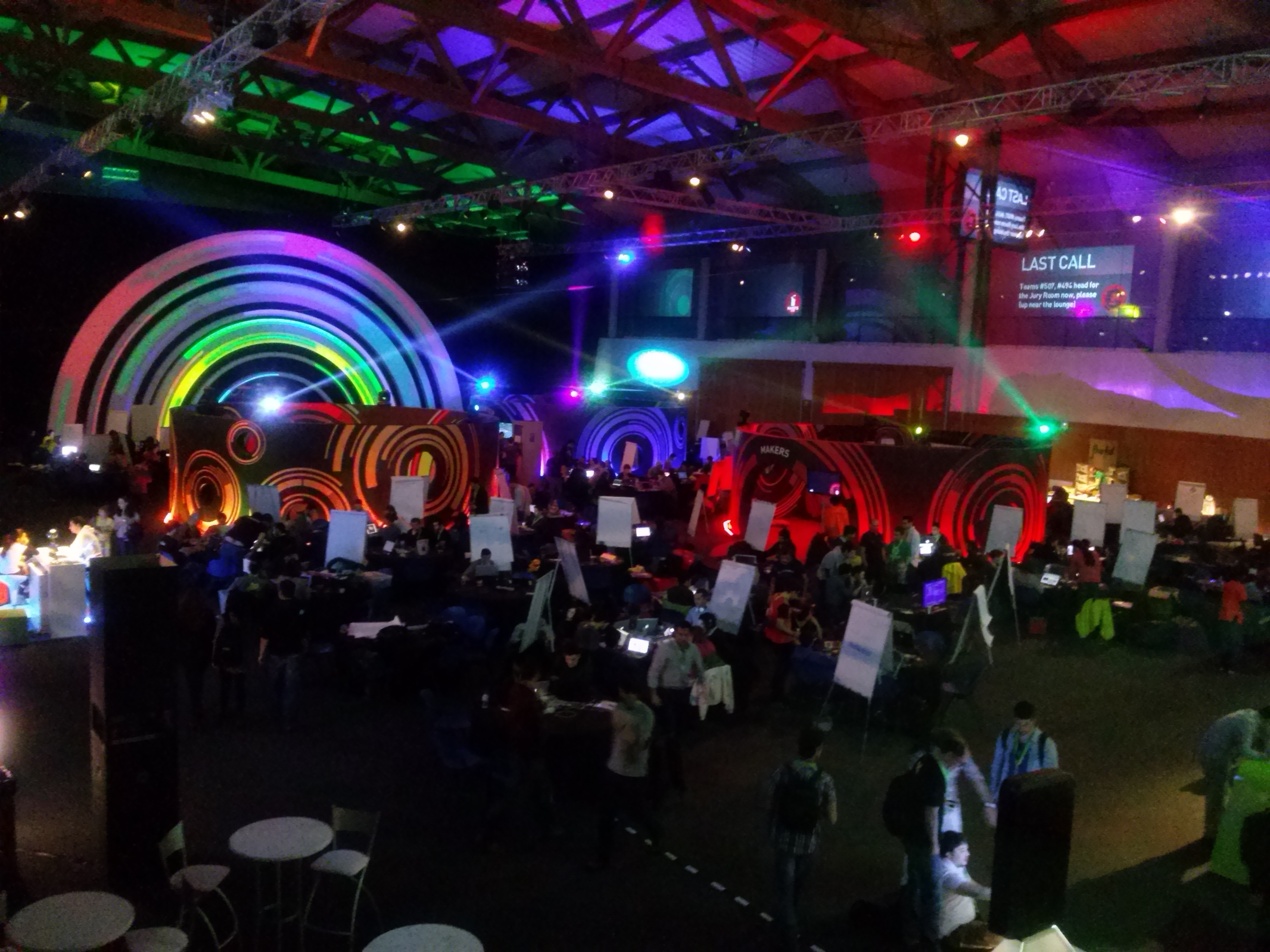
The hackathon hall at Codebits VII (final edition, 2014), with the teams' tables and the secondary stages (the cylindrical structures).

In the hackathon, teams were free to propose whatever project they wanted, software or hardware, with no suggested themes or subject restrictions.

On Saturday, teams were required to present their projects on stage. They had 90 seconds to do it and the audience voted (thumbs up/down) between each presentation. The selection of winning teams was a combination of the audience votes and the votes of a jury panel. The weighting between the audience and jury votes varied from edition to edition.

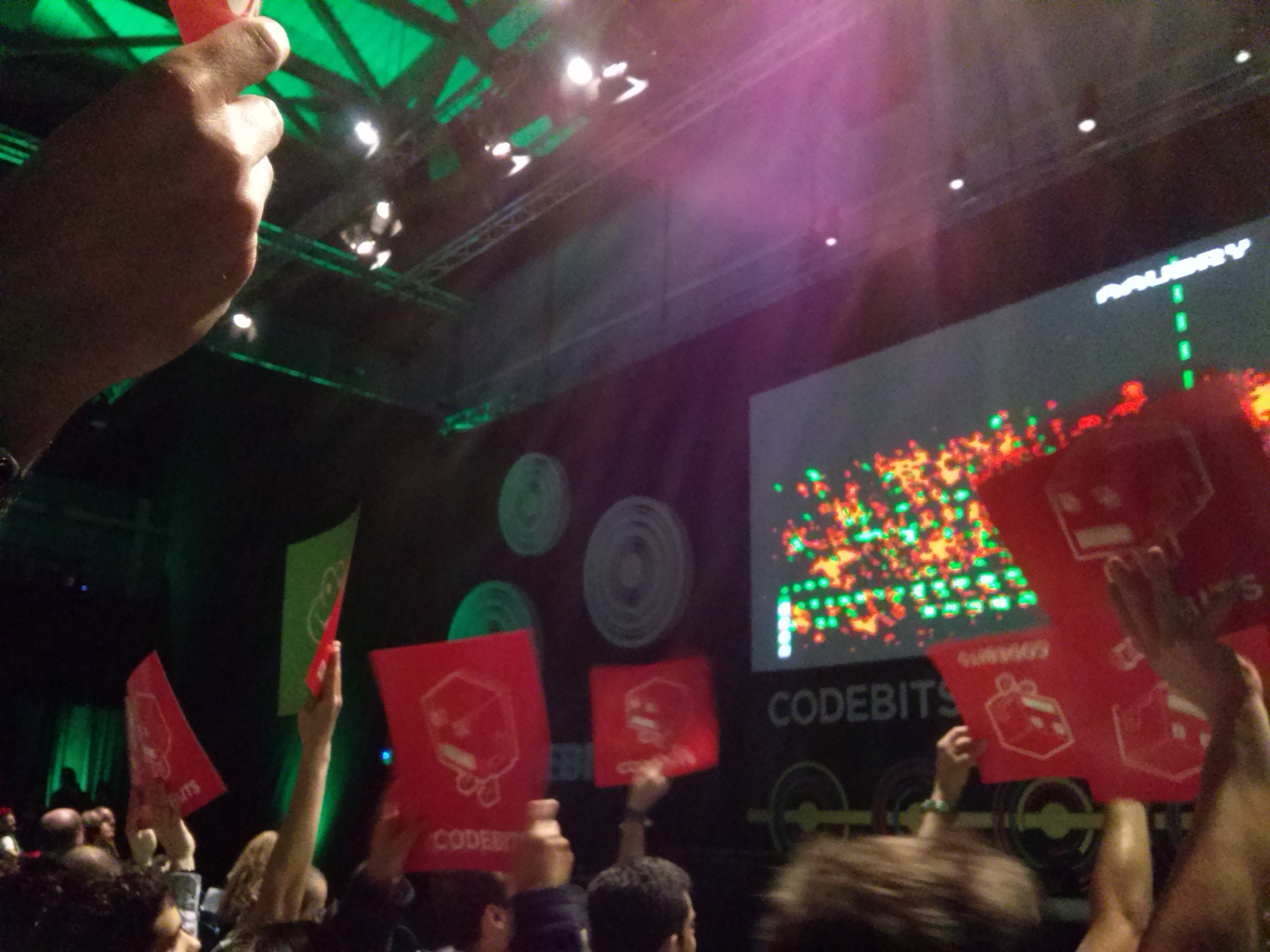
The audience voting for hackathon projects at Codebits VII (final edition, 2014). That year's voting system used computer vision to detect red/green cards.

=== Talks ===
Talks were mostly self-proposed by participants, but there were also a number of talks from invited speakers. Self-proposed talks followed a public process where all proposals were visible to everyone for comments and suggestions, but the final selection was made by the organizers.

=== Evening Activities ===
Satellite activities were usually held in the evenings. These activities usually combined entertainment with some element of geek culture. They were initially meant to relieve some pressure from the hackathon, but gained a life of their own over time. Some of the most prominent activities were:

==== Quiz Show ====
Since 2008, in the four weeks before the event, participants had to solve about one challenge per-week to qualify for the quiz show. The challenges included image enigmas, treasure hunts, code golf contests, among others. They all shared a reasonably high level of difficulty and required a fair knowledge of tech-related culture and motivation. 32 qualified participants then went on stage on Friday after dinner time for a few rounds of questions, mostly about science, technology, and geek trivia.

==== Security Competition ====
The security competition followed a capture-the-flag (CTF) model. Participants were asked to answer questions and solve challenges related to cybersecurity (such as identifying and exploiting vulnerable applications purposely built for the competition) in order to obtain tokens (flags) that translated into points. The competition took place on Thursday evening and lasted over three hours. Like the quiz show, participants had to qualify by solving a few challenges in the weeks before the event.

==== Nuclear Tacos ====
The "nuclear" tacos competition involved eating ultra-spicy tacos as fast as possible over a few rounds of increasing spiciness. It started in 2010 as just a dare to participants but eventually evolved into a proper competition. It usually took place on Friday evening before the quiz show.

==== Other Activities ====
Other activities included a Presentation Karaoke, retro-gaming displays, and workshops on soldering, 3D printing, lockpicking, etc. Earlier editions also included music concerts (e.g. WrayGunn in 2007, Pornophonique in 2009).

=== Makers and Hardware ===
Codebits wasn't just about software and the Internet, the hardware and maker culture was also a significant part of it. There were workshops on electronics from the start and, starting in 2010, there was also significant space dedicated to hardware project showcases and workshops (the "Hardware Den").

== Editions ==
- 2007 — November 13–15 at Gare Marítima de Alcântara, Lisbon — 400 attendees
- 2008 — November 13–15 at LX Factory, Lisbon — 500 attendees
- 2009 — December 3–5 at Cordoaria Nacional, Lisbon — 600 attendees
- 2010 — November 11–13 at Pavilhão Atlântico, Lisbon — 700 attendees
- 2011 — November 10–12 at Pavilhão Atlântico, Lisbon — 800 attendees
- 2012 — November 16–18 at Pavilhão Atlântico, Lisbon — 800 attendees
- 2014 — April 10–12 at MEO Arena, Lisbon — 900 attendees

In 2013, Codebits was planned to happen simultaneously in São Paulo and Lisbon delaying both events due to logistics issues at the Brazilian venue. Meanwhile, the latter was hit by fire (unrelated to Codebits), which forced an out-of-season Lisbon-only event in April 2014.

== Reboot as Pixels Camp ==
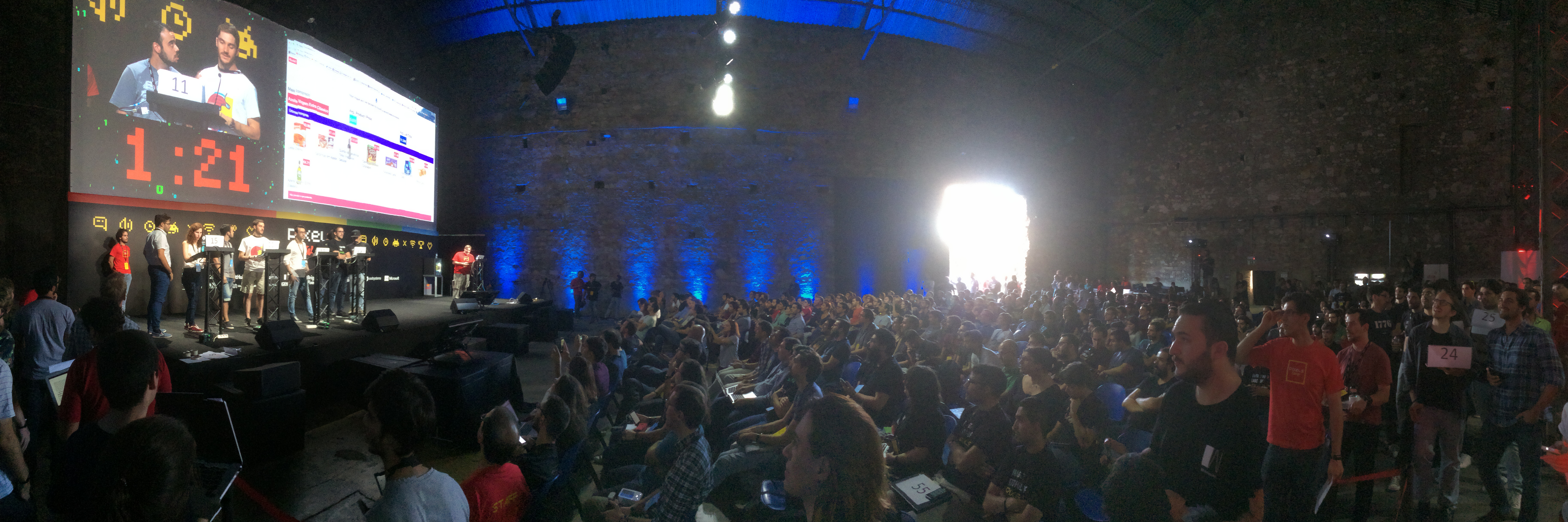
Participants presenting their projects on stage at the first Pixels Camp (2016) while others queue for their turn.

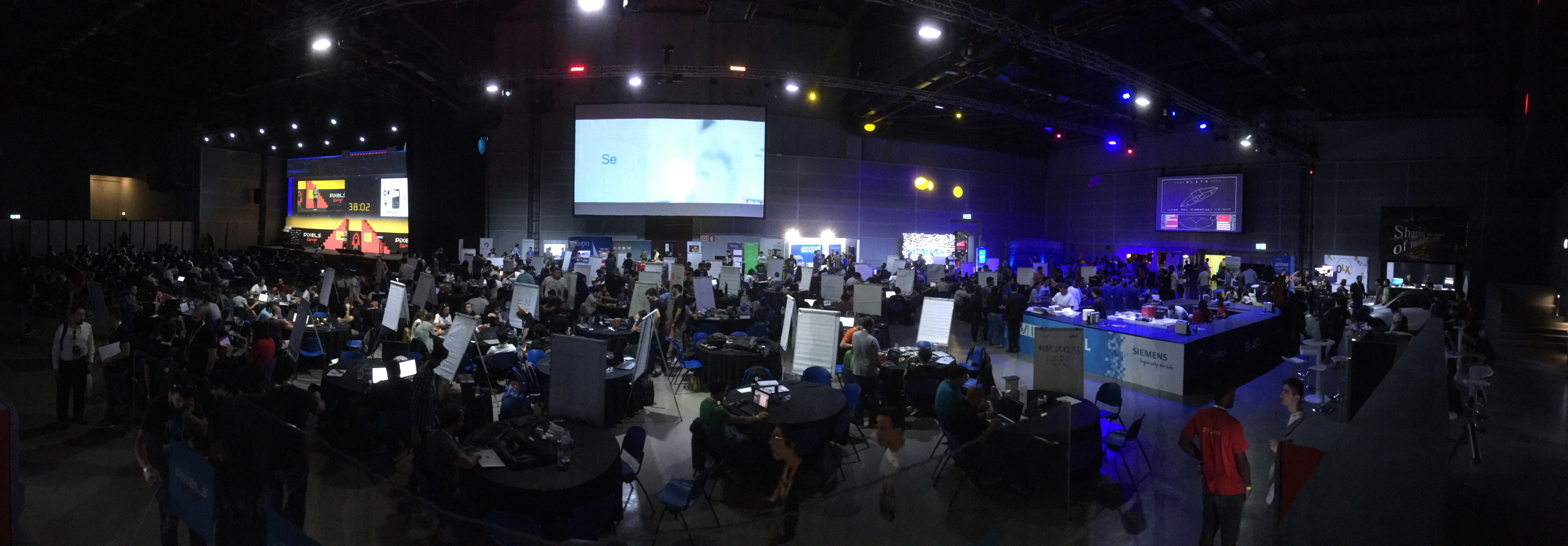
The hackathon and main stage areas at the second Pixels Camp (2017).

In 2016, a team composed mostly of SAPO ex-employees rebooted the event under the name Pixels Camp while keeping the format virtually unchanged.

Pixels Camp had three editions. In March 2020, a fourth edition was already in the very last stages of preparation when the COVID-19 pandemic forced its postponement to later that year. The organization remained active and conducted several online activities over that period, but Pixels Camp v4.0 ended up being officially canceled in mid-September.

Pixels Camp was organized by Bright Pixel (a startup incubator and accelerator part of Sonae group) and financed with the help of sponsorships. It has been informally reported that any future Pixels Camp editions, should they happen, would be organized independently with a financing model still to be defined. As of late 2023, no definite plans are known.

=== Differences to Codebits ===
In Pixels Camp, sponsor pitches replaced product announcements during the opening morning. On stage, sponsors suggested themes related to their own areas of activity for the hackathon. Participants were not required to cover any of the suggested themes in their projects, but often did.

Unlike Codebits, Pixels Camp had significant floor area dedicated to sponsors. Active recruiting was still disallowed, but there was an implicit understanding that participants could approach sponsor at their booths to ask about available job offerings.

The increased reliance on sponsorships and the organizing company's incubator business moved the Pixels Camp hackathon closer to the startup ecosystem. Even though its rules were unchanged from Codebits, participants were more likely to present projects around business ideas rather than projects focused mostly on raw creativity and technical ability.

Outside of the hackathon, Pixels Camp continued the trend of increased focus on self-proposed talks and entertainment content, and of attracting a wider community of technical and creative talent beyond programmers. The colorful choices for the rebooted brand reflected this trend, as did the name.

=== Pixels Camp Editions ===
- 2016 — October 6–8 at LX Factory, Lisbon — 1000 attendees
- 2017 — September 28–30 at Pavilhão Carlos Lopes, Lisbon — 1200 attendees
- 2019 — March 21–23 at Pavilhão Carlos Lopes, Lisbon — 1300 attendees
- 2020 (canceled) — November 26–28 at Pavilhão Carlos Lopes, Lisbon
