= Belém, Lisbon =

District of Lisbon, Portugal

Belém
- Civil parish
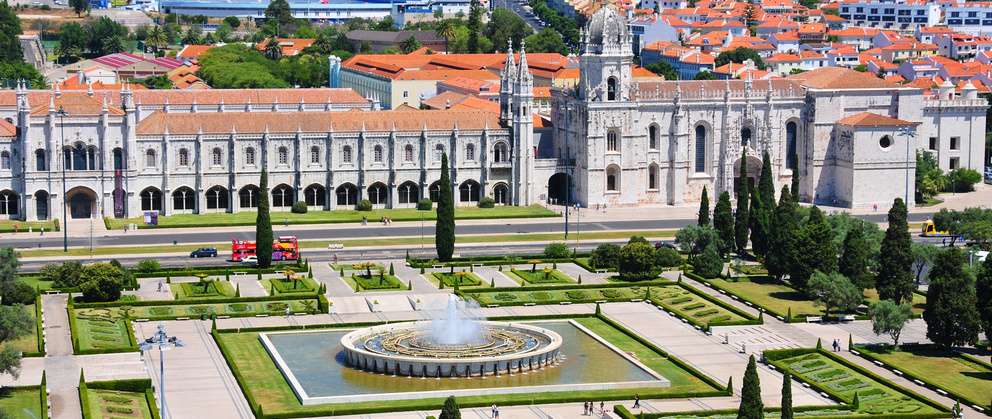
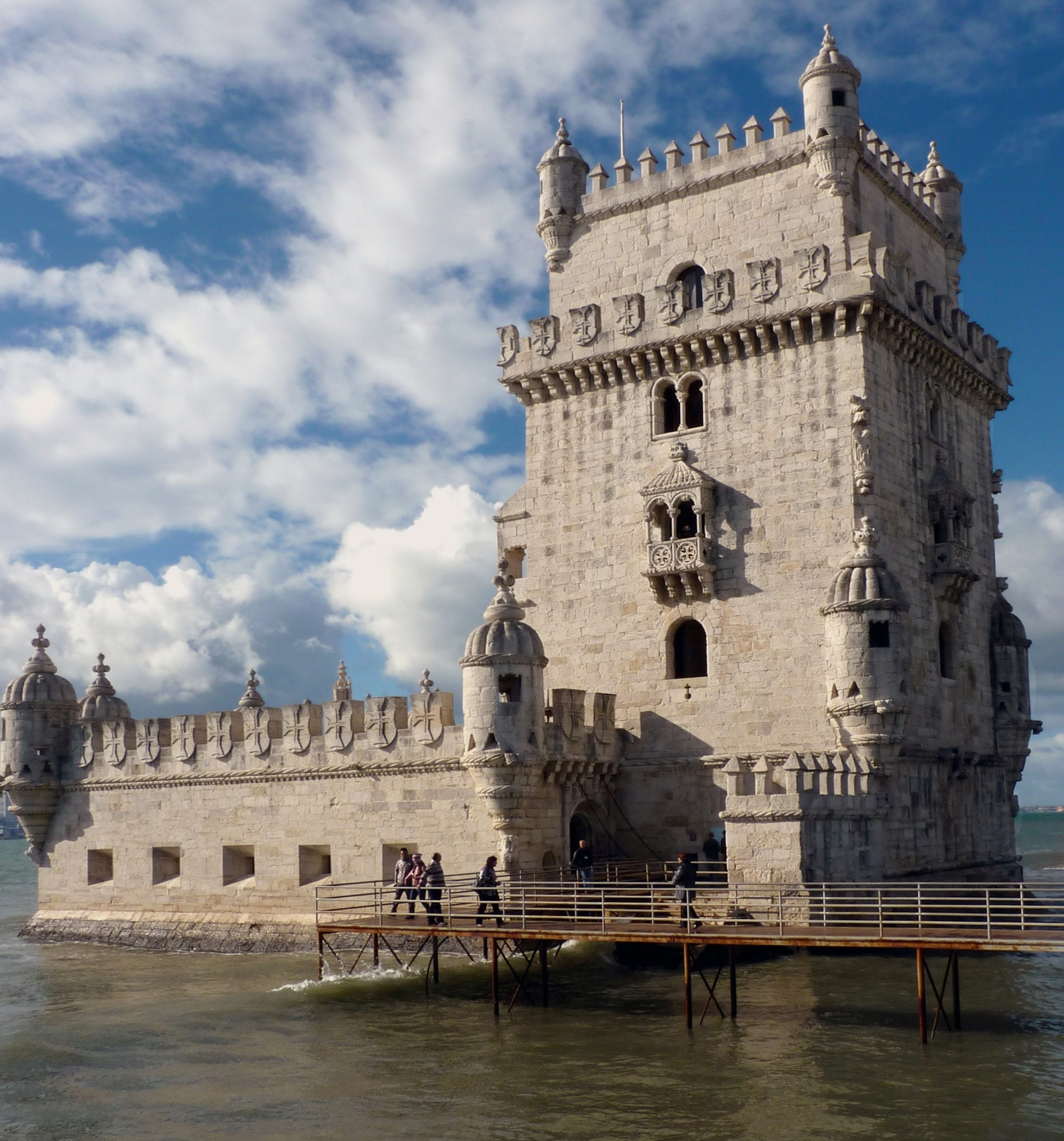
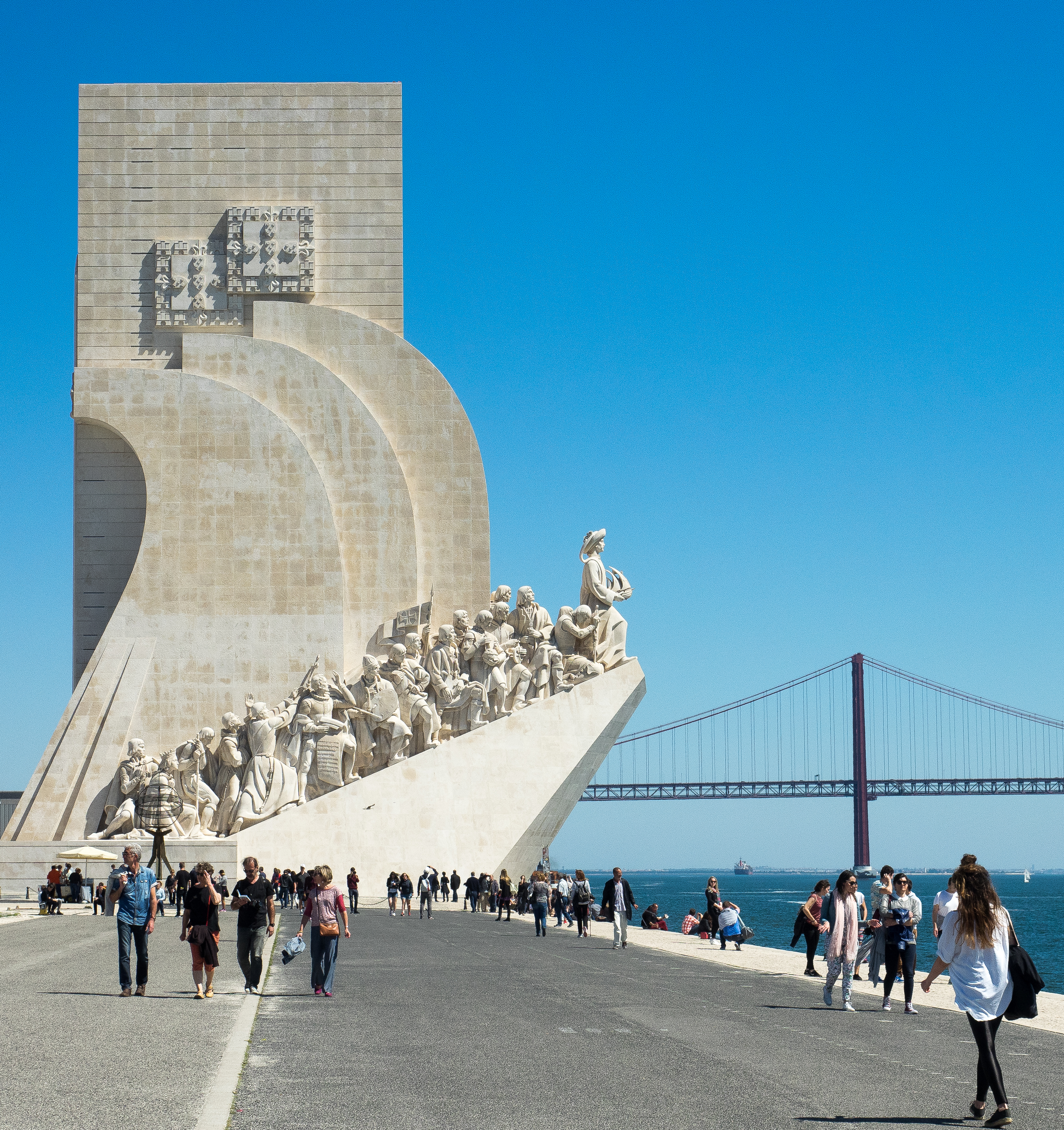
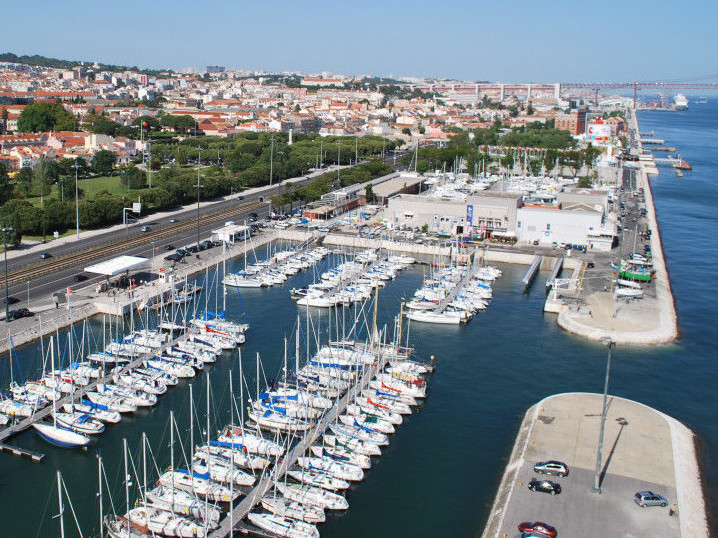
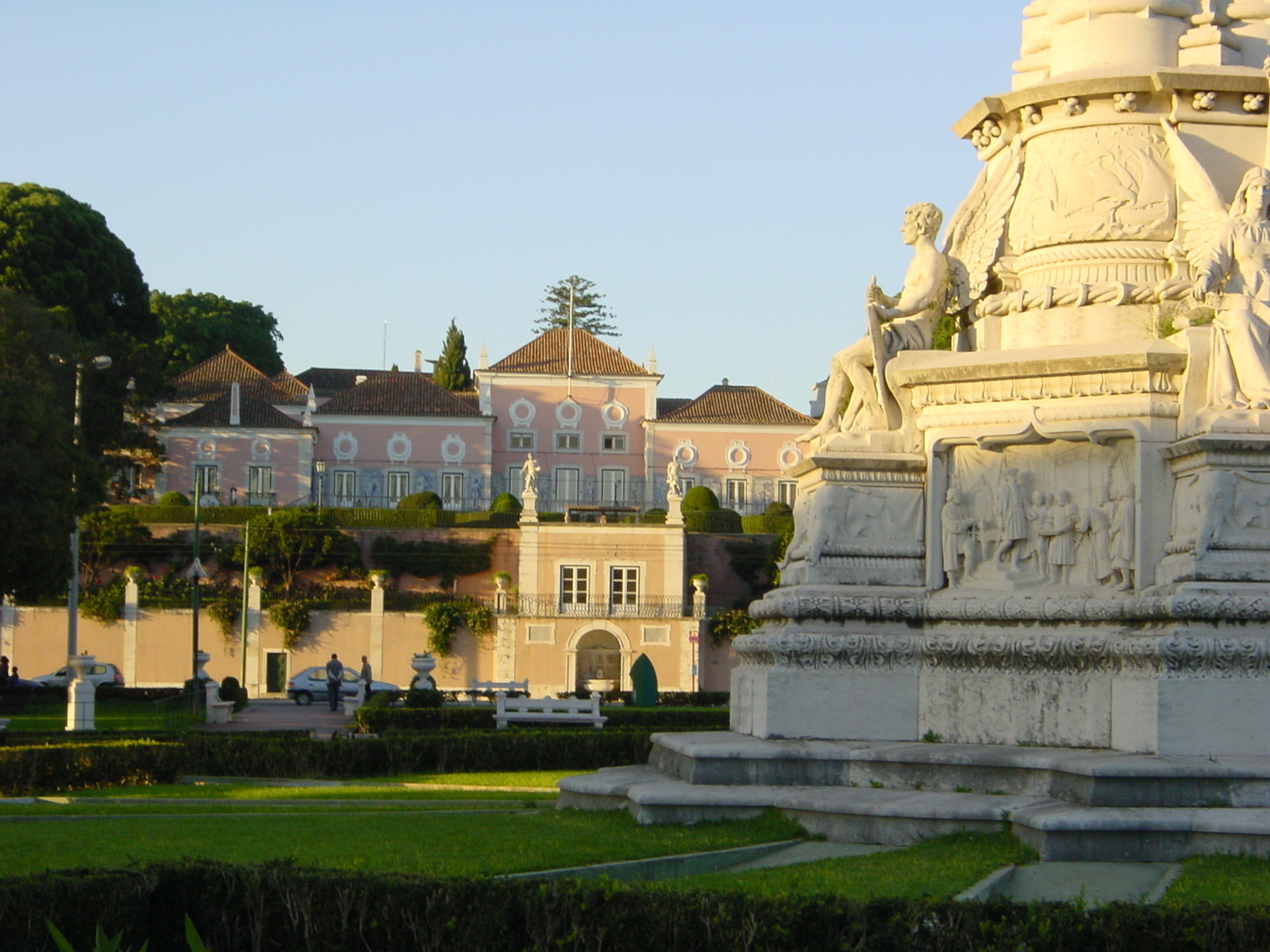
- Clockwise: Jerónimos Monastery; the Padrão dos Descobrimentos; Belém National Palace; Belém Docks; Belém Tower.

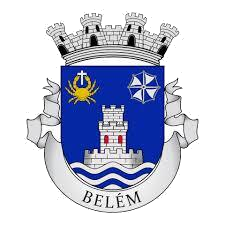
- Coat of arms

- Coordinates: 38.699°N 9.209°W
- Country: Portugal
- Region: Lisbon
- Metropolitan area: Lisbon
- District: Lisbon
- Municipality: Lisbon

Area
  - Total: 10.43 km^{2} (4.03 sq mi)

Population (2011)
  - Total: 16,528
  - Density: 1,585/km^{2} (4,104/sq mi)
- Time zone: UTC+00:00 (WET)
  - Summer (DST): UTC+01:00 (WEST)
- Postal code: 1400
- Area code: 213
- Patron: Santa Maria de Belém
- Website: http://jf-belem.pt

Belém (locally [bɨˈlɐ̃j]) is a freguesia (civil parish) and district of Lisbon, the capital of Portugal. Belém is located in western Lisbon, to the west of Ajuda and Alcântara and directly east of Lisbon's border with Oeiras. Belém is famous as a museum district, as the home of many of the most notable monuments of Lisbon and Portugal alike, such as the Belém Tower, the Jerónimos Monastery, the Padrão dos Descobrimentos, and Belém Palace (official residence of the President of Portugal). The population in 2011 was 16,528.

== History ==
Archaeological evidence discovered along the margins of the Tagus indicates that human occupation in the area of Belém dates to the Paleolithic era.

=== Middle Ages ===
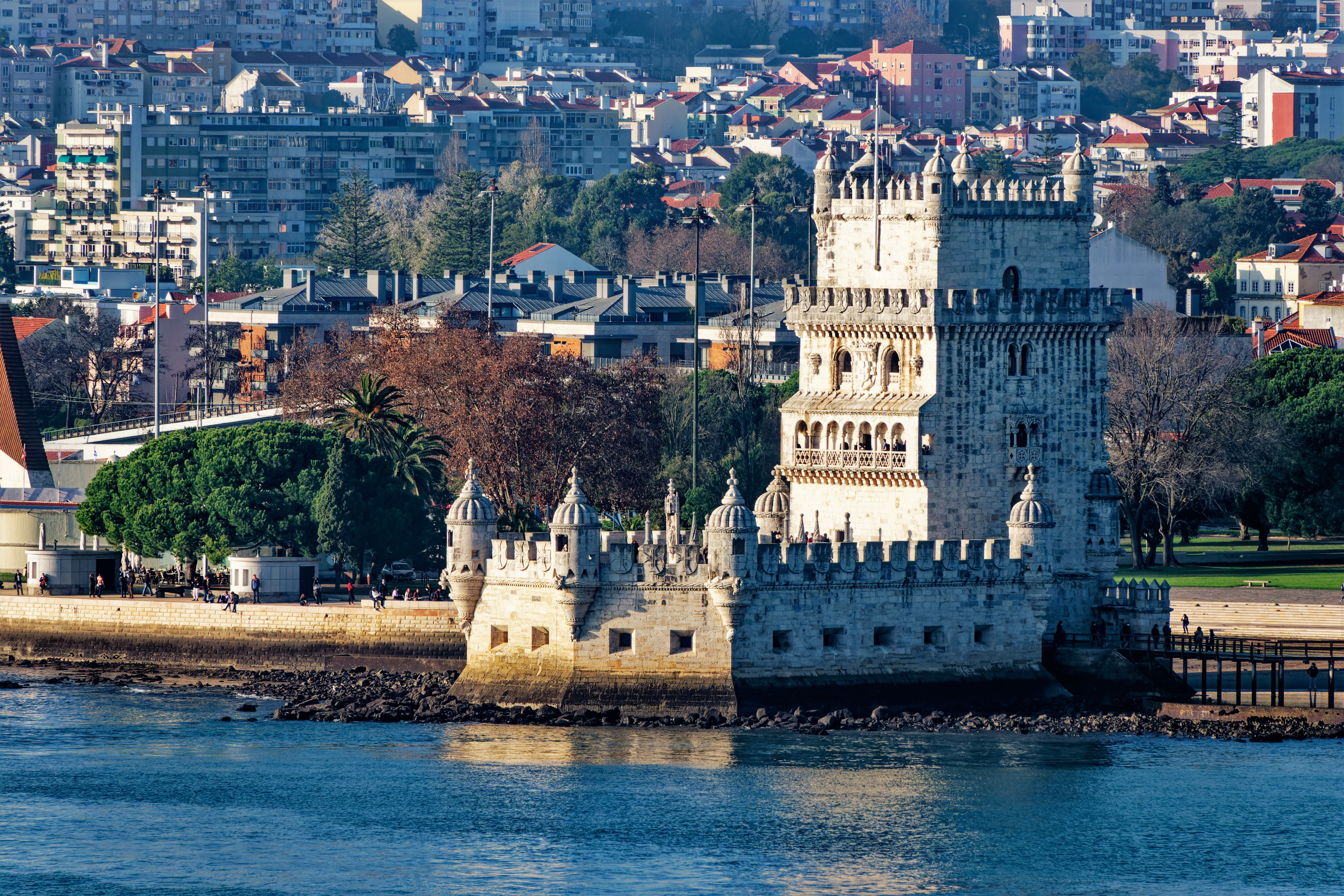
Belém Tower, a Manueline military outpost built in the Tagus river.

With the establishment of the Kingdom of Portugal by Afonso III, royal surveys, or inquirições gerais (general inquiries), were made at his command to inspect titles of lands claimed by the nobility and clergy, determined that the population around Lisbon was dispersed throughout the lowlands, which were suitable for agriculture. Consequently, Belém was connected to the neighbouring city by a bridge at Alcântara. Belém's proximity to the River Tagus also encouraged the development of commercial activities in the small village of Aldeia do Restelo, which attracted mariners and other seafarers seeking safe anchorage and protection from the winds when they entered the river. In the 14th century, Moors settled on and cultivated the surrounding lands, providing the city with produce; other Moors, both free and enslaved, worked in the fishing industry. Meanwhile, settlement in Restelo grew slowly towards Lisbon.

It was "to give religious and spiritual support" to the villagers that Henry the Navigator, as governor in the military-religious Order of Christ, initiated construction near the fishing port of a small church dedicated to Saint Mary. Henry also ordered the construction of a fountain and water trough in 1460 to provide drinking water for the people and their animals. The foundation of the church and the Jerónimos Monastery by Manuel I around 1459 on the site of the older church resulted in its transfer from the Order of Christ to the Hieronymite monks, and at the same time in its being renamed Santa Maria de Belém. The existing structure was started on the orders of Manuel I (1469–1521) at the courts of Montemor-o-Velho in 1495, as a final resting-place for members of the House of Aviz, in his belief that an Iberian dynastic kingdom would rule after his death. In 1496, King Manuel petitioned the Holy See for permission to construct a monastery at the entrance of the Tagus. It was after the arrival of Vasco da Gama a year later with samples of gold he had discovered that the monastery became a symbol of Portuguese expansionism. The church became a house of prayer for seamen leaving or entering the port.

=== Brigantine era ===
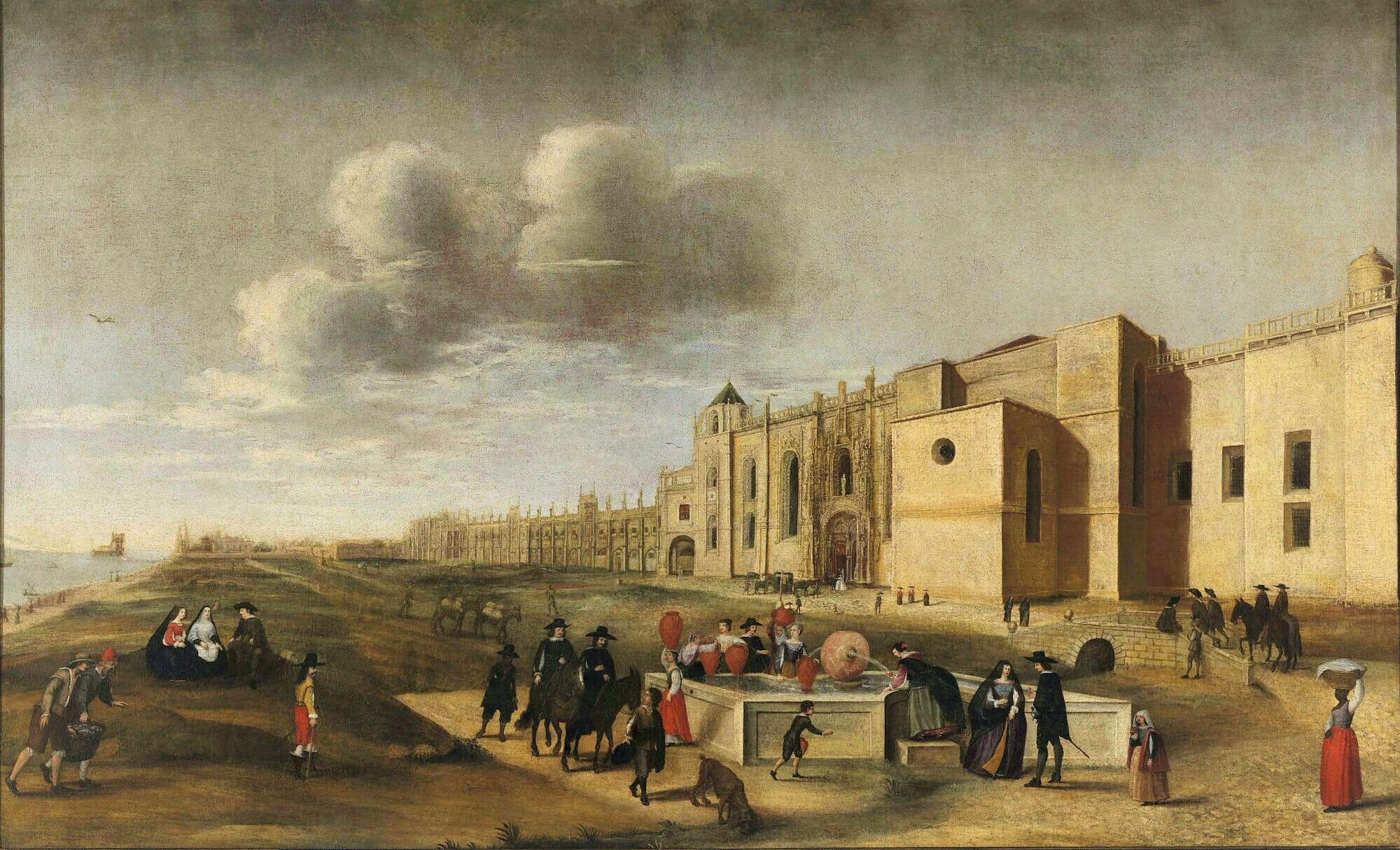
Jerónimos Monastery in 1657.

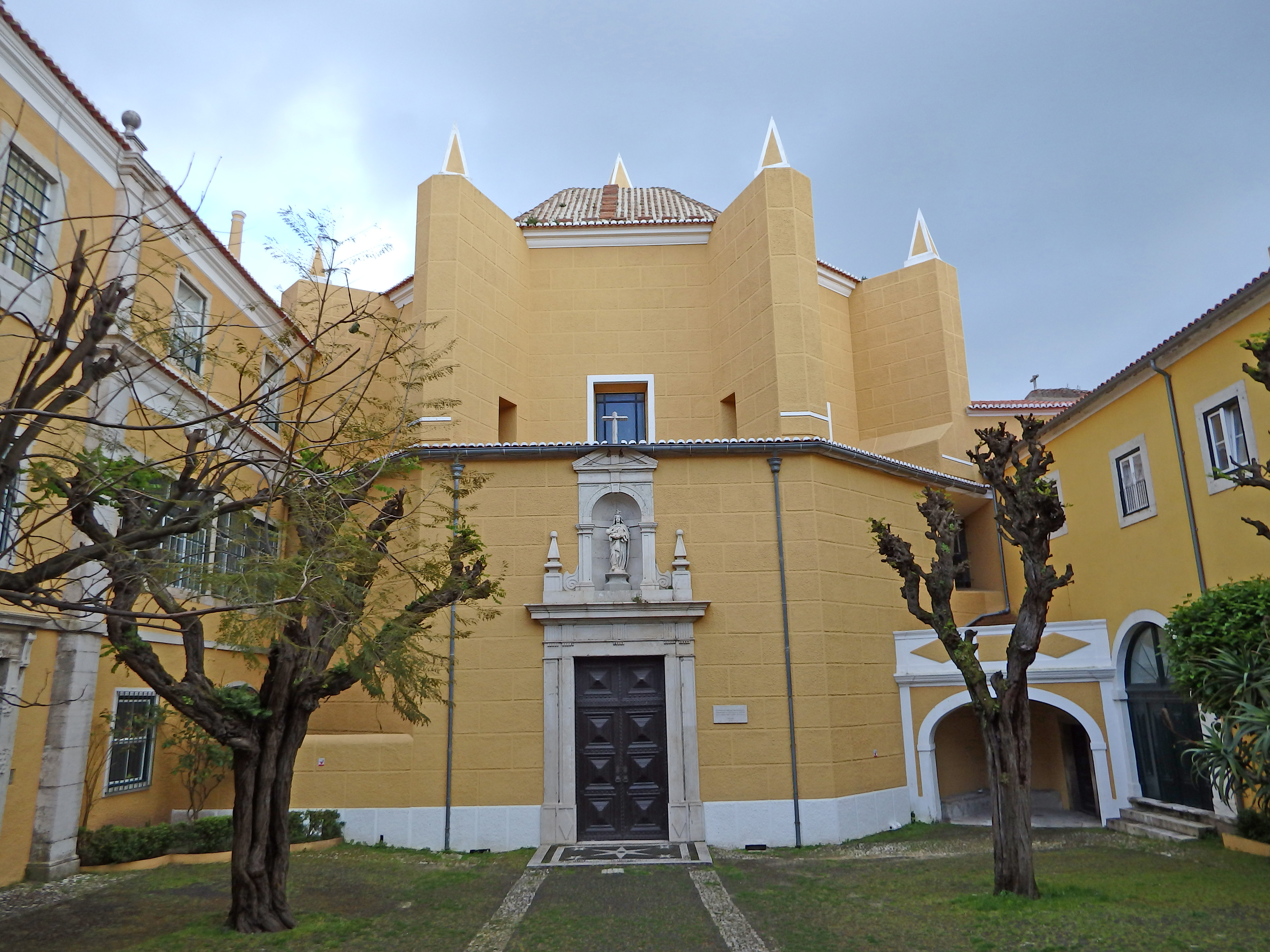
Bom Sucesso Convent, built 1639.

With the restoration of Portuguese independence in 1640, the monastery regained much of its former importance, becoming the burial place for the royal pantheon; within its walls four of the eight children of King John IV were entombed: the Infante Teodósio (1634–1653), the Infanta Joana (1636–1653), King Afonso VI (1643–1683) and Catherine of Braganza (1638–1705). On 29 September 1855, the body of King Afonso VI was transported to the royal pantheon of the House of Braganza in the Monastery of São Vicente de Fora, along with his three brothers and sister. During the reign of Peter II, in 1682, the bodies of King Sebastian and Cardinal Henrique were buried in the transept chapels.

The same monarch ordered construction of "a tower of four storeys" (in the words of Damião de Góis) on a basaltic outcropping of rocks in the Tagus near its north bank, using some of the stones being collected to build the Jerónimos Monastery. This was the foundation of the bastion of the Belém Tower (Torre de Belém). After completion of these two construction projects, a number of manors in the surrounding countryside were established by the nobility. As the population continued to slowly grow, the demographics of the suburb changed sufficiently that Friar Nicolau de Oliveira indicated in 1620 that it was within the city limits. New convents appeared in the area, and between 1551 and 1591 (as noted by Vieira da Silva) the civil parish of Ajuda (Nossa Senhora da Ajuda) was created, consisting of a vast territory with clerics installed in the Monastery of Belém.

The Belém district became increasingly popular after King John V acquired estates and properties in the area to develop defenses for Lisbon. Carvalho da Costa noted in his Corografia Portuguesa that "...immediately in front of Junqueira is the locality of Belém, so healthy and appreciable that the naturals and visitors want to live there, and those who for want of comfort can not live [there] are continually competing for that site. In it there are houses, noble estates, nobility, nobles of the first order in the Kingdom; and if the land permitted more palaces or buildings, the city would continue unto that site".

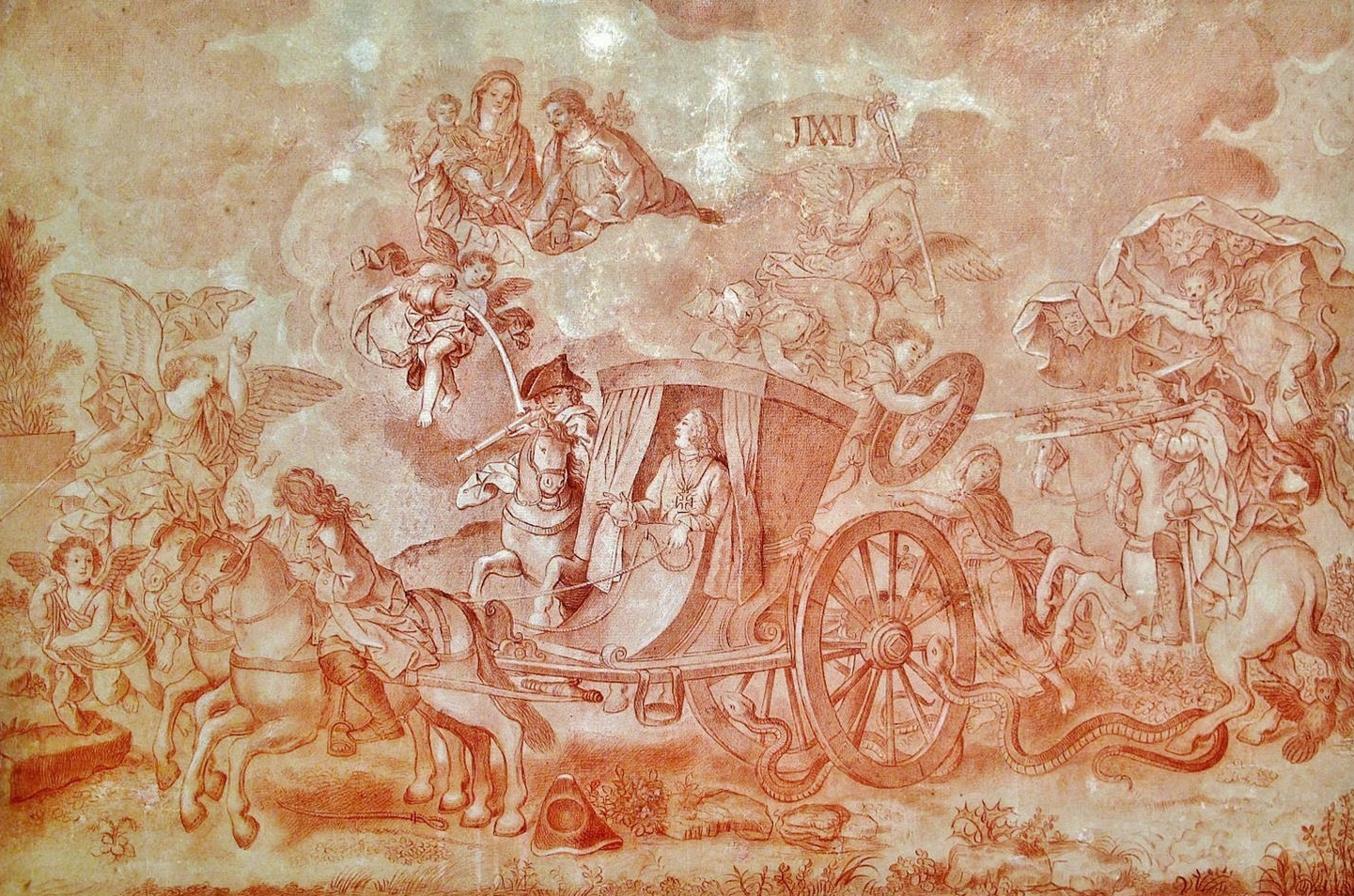
The attempted assassination of King José I of Portugal in 1759.

In 1770, during the reign of Joseph I, the ecclesiastical parish of São Pedro de Alcântara, including the territory east of the Alcântra River, was established, thus deannexing it from Ajuda. The barrio of Belém was officially constituted with its own judicial and administrative authority, and included the ecclesiastical parish of Ajuda, part of Alcântra and Santa Isabel, as well as the parishes of Benfica, Belas, Barcarena and Carnaxide.

Belém and Ajuda were the areas around Lisbon suffering the least destruction in the great Lisbon earthquake and the following tsunami on 1 November 1755. Many of the survivors who lost their homes were installed in numerous tents and shacks in the region. King Joseph and his court moved to a complex of tents and barracks located on a part of the royal estates where the Ajuda National Palace would be built. This relocation by the King and his prime minister and Secretary of State, the Marquess of Pombal, attracted commerce and made Belém-Ajuda the centre of the state bureaucracy during the third quarter of the 18th century. A military presence was also deemed important by the government: two regimental infantry barracks under the Count of Lippe, and a cavalry regiment under Mecklenburg were installed. These events consolidated the integration of Belém-Ajuda into the city of Lisbon.

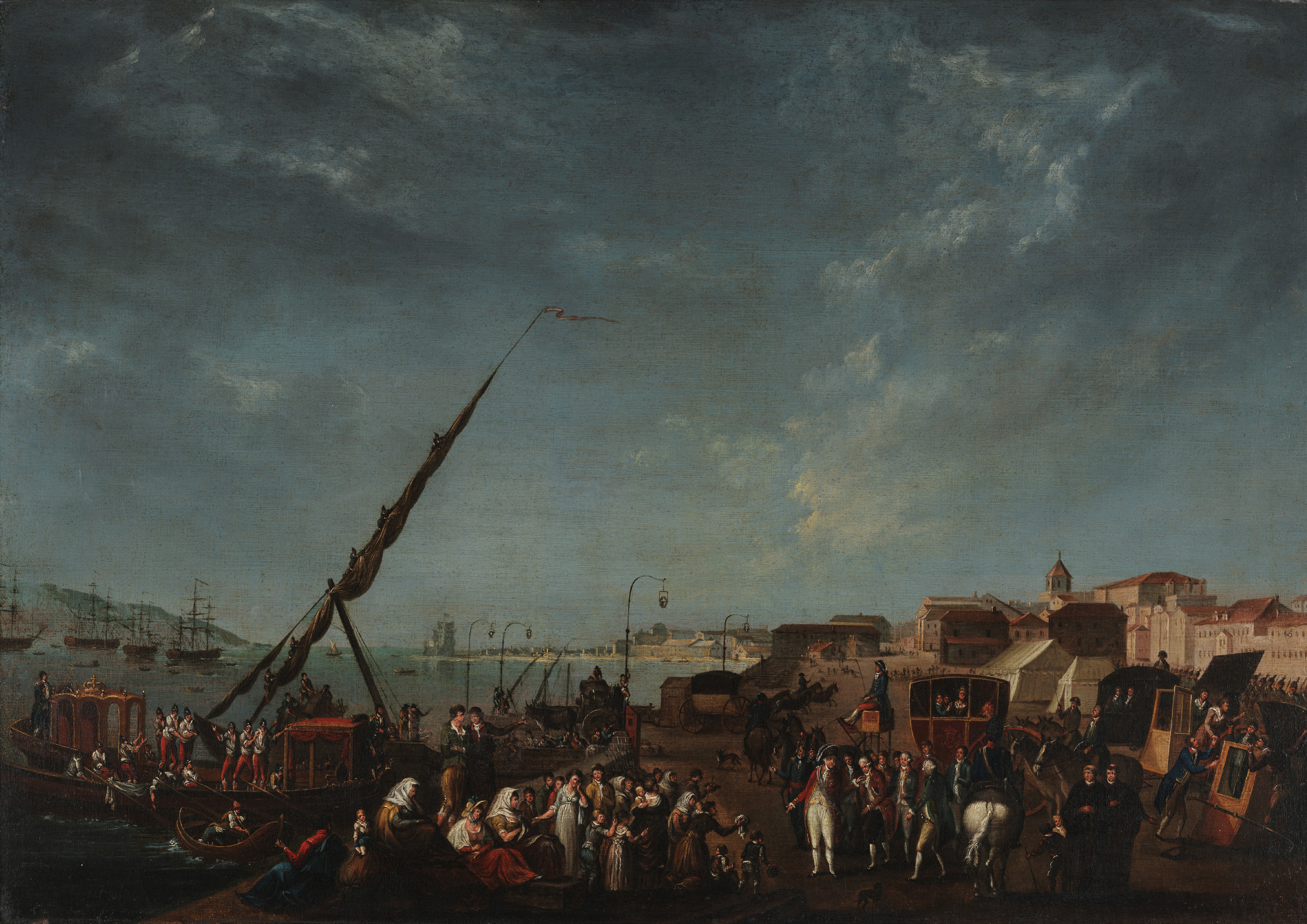
The transfer of the Portuguese court to Brazil from Belém on 27 November 1807

During the latter part of the 18th century, the monarchy slowly extricated itself from Belém-Ajuda. In 1794, a fire in Ajuda destroyed the Royal Tent (Tenda Real), forcing the royal family to abandon the location and take residence in the Queluz National Palace. A lack of funds had delayed completion of the Ajuda National Palace, so with the French invasion in 1807, the royal family fled to Rio de Janeiro. When they returned to Portugal in 1821, King John VI installed them in the Necessidades and Bemposta Palaces.

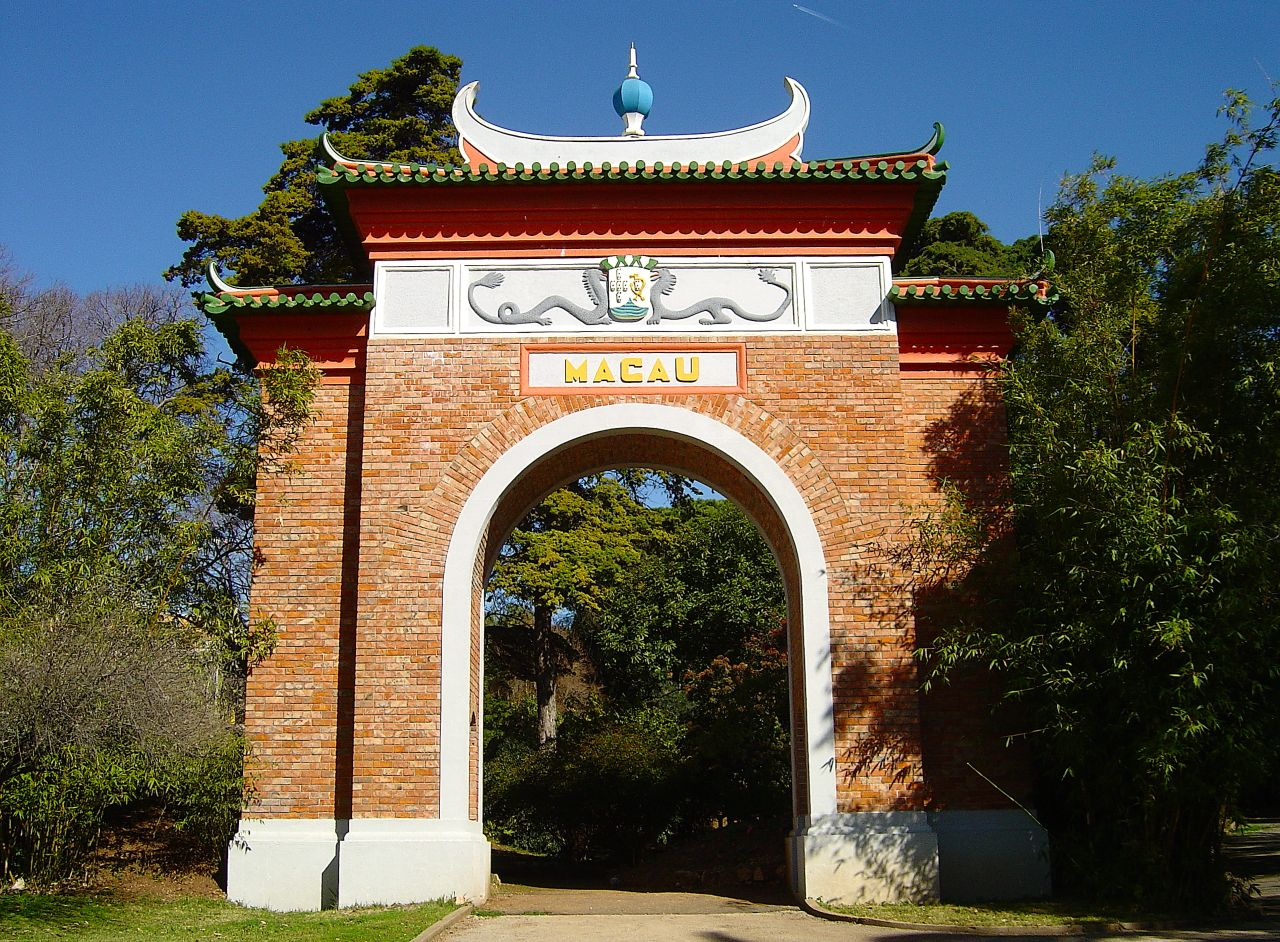
The Tropical Botanical Garden of the Overseas Empire, founded in 1906.

Belém gradually evolved into an industrial zone, particularly around Pedrouços and Bom Sucesso, attracting factories of various kinds such as tanneries, metal stampers, glassmakers, earthenware manufacturers, textile makers, woollenware producers and a rope-making factory for shipping.

On 28 December 1833, the civil parish of Santa Maria de Belém, including the parish of Ajuda, was institutionalised with its seat in the Jerónimos Monastery. Rapid industrialization began in this period and continued throughout the 19th century; an 1881 inquiry established that 25 factories produced goods in the Alcântara-Belém region, employing 1,215 men, 812 women and 432 minors. The growth attracted many new residents and subsidised housing was constructed to support the manufacturing industry.

Belém subsequently had more autonomy: a separate municipality of Belém actually existed between 11 September 1852 and 18 June 1885, presided over by its first president, the historian Alexandre Herculano. The municipality included the parishes of Nossa Senhora da Ajuda, Santa Maria de Belém, part of São Pedro de Alcântara, Santa Isabel and São Sebastião da Pedreira, as well as Nossa Senhora do Amparo de Benfica, São Lourenço de Carnide and Menino Jesus de Odivelas. The royal family of King Louis of Portugal and Queen Maria Pia of Savoy began to reside in the Ajuda National Palace.

=== Republic ===
Belém Palace became the official residence of the President of Portugal following the Revolution of 1910.

Belém was also the location for the development of many urban projects, such as the construction of a landfill, opening of many docks or the opening of a rail link to Cascais, which initially departed from Pedrouços. Socially, the first recreational and cultural organizations were established, and the area was a place for leisure activities.

On transitioning into the 20th century, Belém had grown considerably, with the establishment of electrical services within the area and significantly with the 1940 Portuguese exhibition. The 1940 Expo resulted in the demolition of the older nucleus of Belém, the Praça do Império. and the beginning of a phase of monumental constructions which, along with pre-existing historic architecture (such as the Jerónimos Monastery, Belém Tower, and Belém Palace) began to occupy the waterfront. This included the iconic Padrão dos Descobrimentos and the modern Centro Cultural de Belém which helped to promote tourist and cultural exploration of the north margin of the Tagus.

Until 2012, the area of Belém had its own historic parish, named Santa Maria de Belém. In 2012, the Administrative Reform of Lisbon resulted in the merging of the latter and the parish of São Francisco Xavier, thus creating the new parish of Belém.

== Geography ==
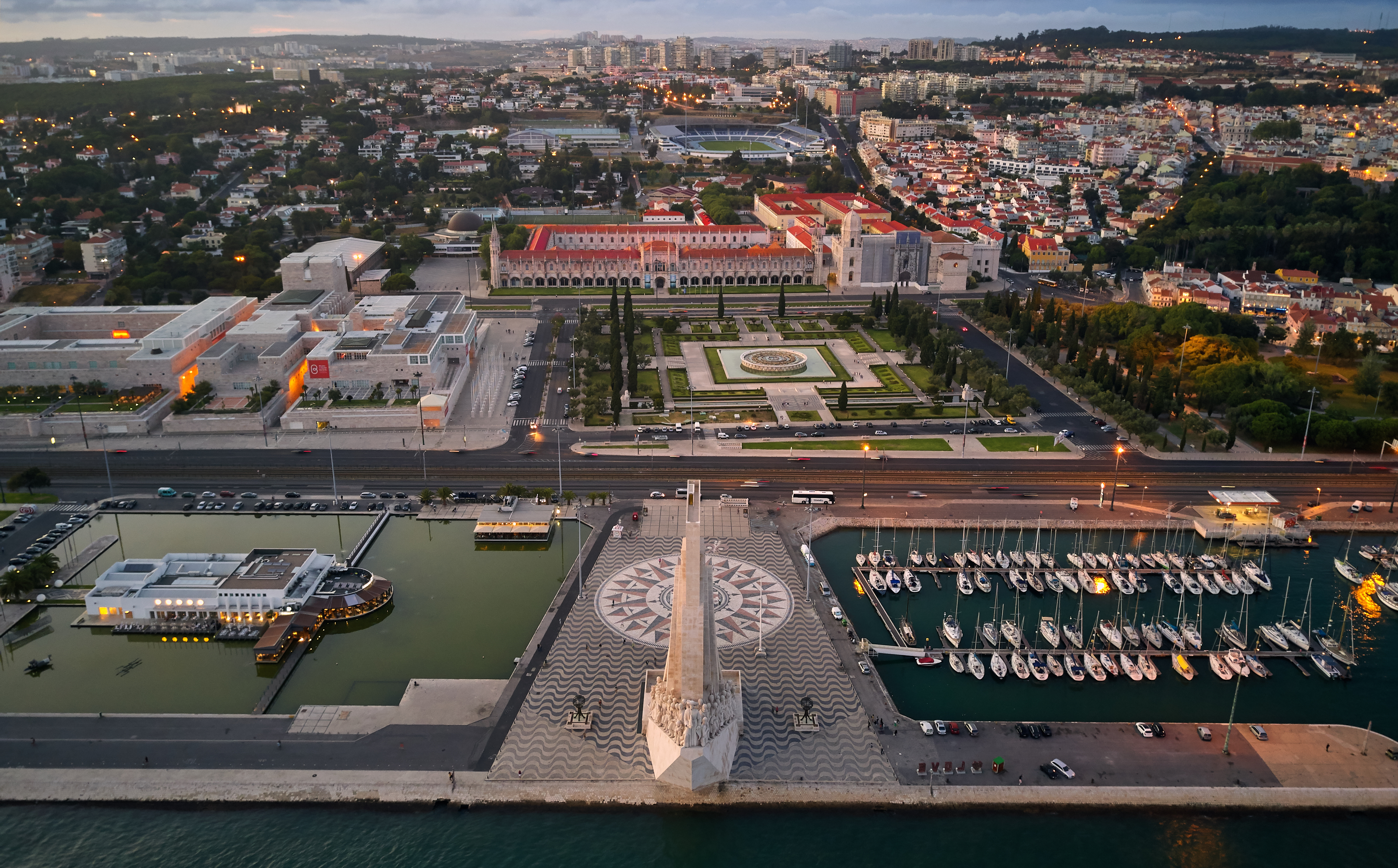
An aerial view of Belém's Praça do Império (Imperial Square).

The southwestern limit of the city of Lisbon, Belém is delimited by the Tagus estuary to the south, the margins of the Algés river and the IC17-CRIL highway, to the west, until the northern limit of the A5 highway). In addition, the Alcântara river and the former eastern limits of the parish of São Francisco Xavier, until the Estrada de Queluz (Road of Queluz) reaches the A5 highway.

It is bordered by the parishes of Alcântara in the east, Ajuda in the northeast, and Benfica in the north; and to the west by the municipality of Oeiras (Algés).

In addition to the historical buildings and avenues, Belém is the location of the Jardim do Ultramar (English: Overseas Garden), several blocks of green-spaces that includes the gardens of the Praça do Império (English: Imperial Garden), the Jardim Vasco da Gama (English: Vasco da Gama Garden), Afonso de Albuquerque Square and Jardim Agricola Tropical (English: Tropical Garden Museum). These gardens cover a large portion of the waterfront area, encircling the buildings of the Rua de Belém, and backs onto the gardens of the Palace of Belém. Also located in Belém is the extreme southwest section of the Monsanto Forest Park.

== Architecture ==
The Tagus Power Station, built in 1908, now houses the Electricity Museum.

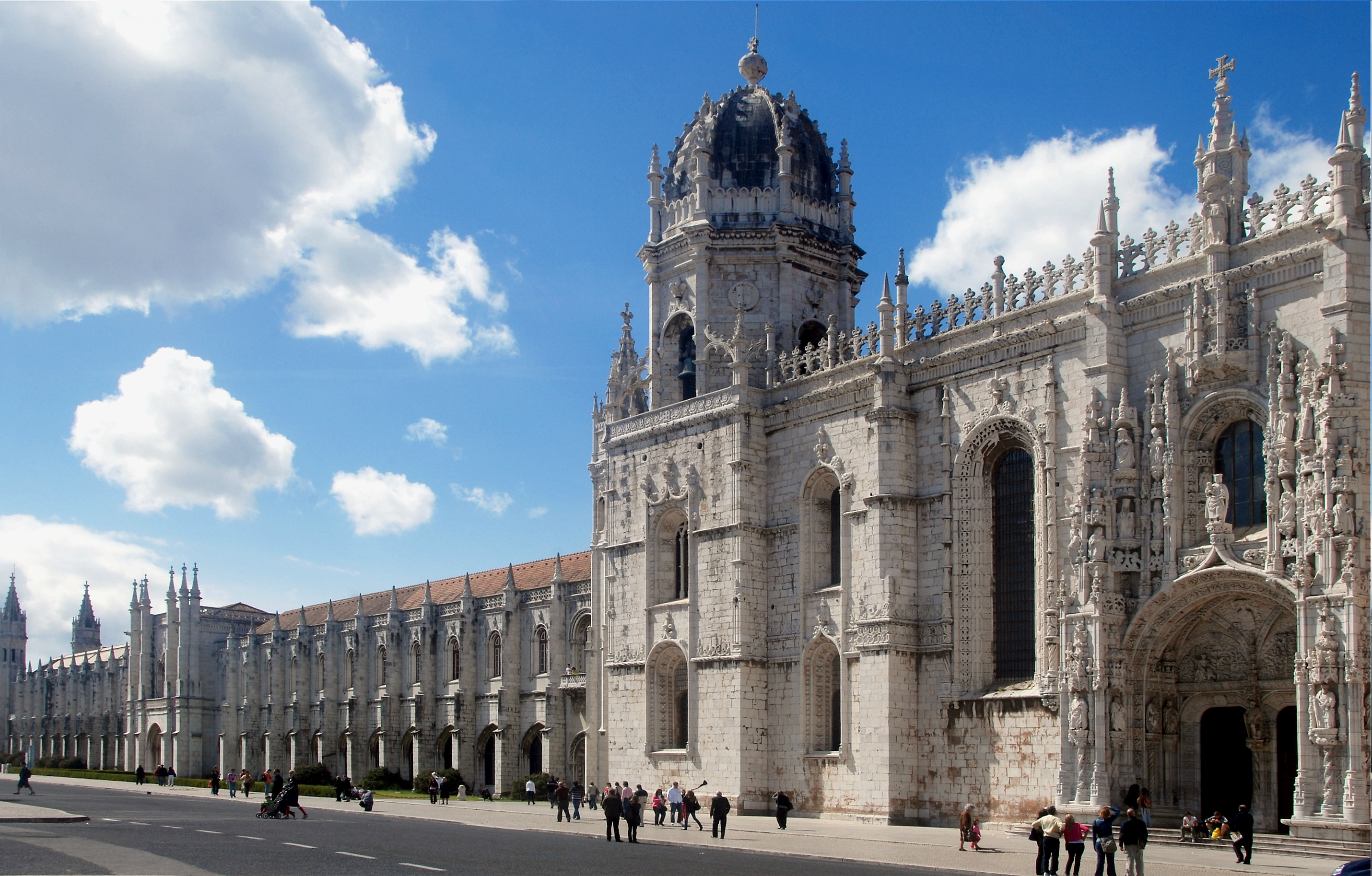
Jerónimos Monastery, built in the 16th century, is a magnum opus of Manueline architecture.

Belém is recognized for its concentration of national monuments and public spaces, including a mixture of historical buildings and modern symbols of Portuguese culture. This juxtaposition of famous icons developed from Belém's important military position along the mouth of the Tagus; its role in the exploration in India and the Far East (the Caminho das Índias); and 17th–18th century construction of royal residences and noble estates in the parish following the destruction stemming from the 1755 earthquake and tsunami.

Belém's main street and historical avenue is Rua de Belém, a strip of 160-year-old buildings that have survived several years of change and modernization. This includes the famous pastry shop Fábrica de Pasteis de Belém known for a specific Portuguese confectionery: pastel de Belém (pl.: pastéis de Belém), an egg tart made with flaky pastry.

Champalimaud Foundation, one of the world's leading research centers.

In the heart of Belém is the Praça do Império, an avenue of open-spaces and gardens, with a central fountain, which was laid-out during World War II. To the west of the gardens lies the Centro Cultural de Belém, built in 1992 during Portugal's term in the revolving role at the helm of the European Union presidency. It is now an arts complex, containing Belém's Museu Colecção Berardo. To the southeast of the gardens is the Belém Palace (1770), the official residence of the Portuguese President. Five hundred metres to the east of Praça do Império lies Belém's other major square Praça Afonso de Albuquerque.

MAAT, the Museum of Art, Architecture and Technology.

Belém is home to a number of other museums: Museu da Electricidade (Electricity Museum), Museum of Art, Architecture and Technology, Museu do Centro Científico e Cultural de Macau (Macau Cultural Museum), Museu de Arte Popular (Folk Art Museum), Museu Nacional dos Coches (Coach Museum), and Museu da Presidência da República (Presidential Museum).

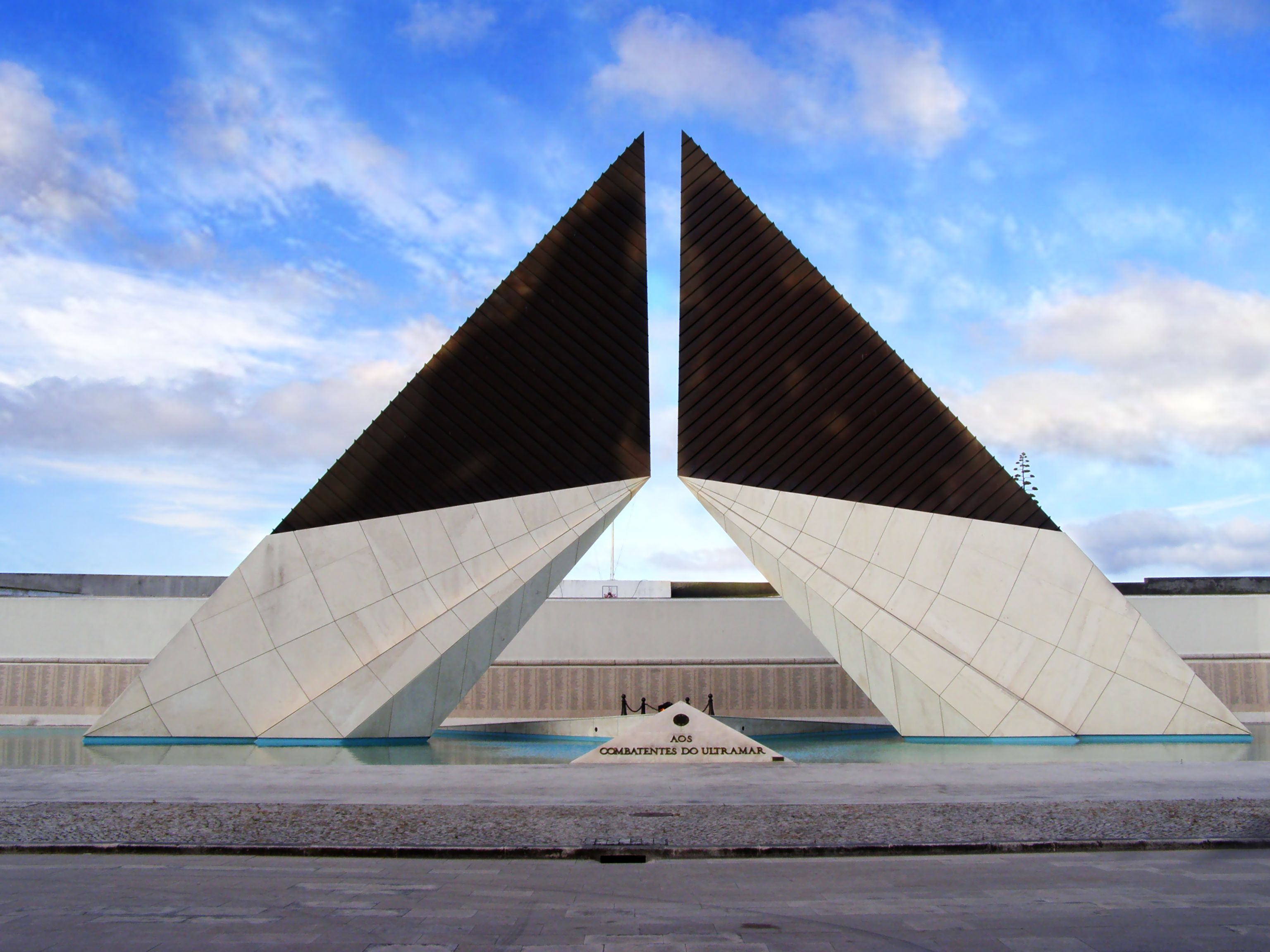
Monument to the Combatants of the Portuguese Colonial War.

Belenenses, a renowned sports club from Lisbon is based in Belém, commonly known as the "fourth big team", because up until 1982 was one of the four Portuguese teams (the others are Benfica, Sporting and Porto) that never were never relegated to the second league. In its history Belenenses won the Portuguese Championship once and the Portuguese Cup for three times.

=== Civic ===
- Belém Tower (Portuguese: Torre de Belém) – constructed on the rocky outcropping/island along the northern margin of the Tagus River as part of a defensive system to protect access to the Tagus estuary envisioned by John II of Portugal, it is one of Belém's iconic symbols of the parish. Originally, the Tower of Saint Vincent (Portuguese: Torre de São Vicente), it was elaborated by Manuel I of Portugal (1515–1520) to guard the entrance to the port at Belém. It stood on a little island in right side of the Tagus, surrounded by water.
- Monument to the Discoveries (Portuguese: Padrão dos Descobrimentos) - located on the edge of the Tagus' northern bank, this 52 metre-high slab of concrete, was erected in 1960 to commemorate the 500th anniversary of the death of Henry the Navigator. The monument is sculpted in the form of a ship's prow, with dozens of figures from Portuguese history following a statue of the Infante Henry sculpted in bas-relief. Adjacent to the monument is a calçada square in the form of a map, showing the routes of various Portuguese explorers, during the Age of Discovery.
- Thai Pavilion (Portuguese: Sala Thai) - Located inside Vasco Da Gama Garden, a gift from the Royal Thai Government honoring the 500th anniversary of the establishment of the bilateral relations between Thailand and Portugal. The Pavilion was inaugurated by her Royal Highness the Princess Maha Chakri Sirindhorn and the Mayor of Lisbon, Mr. Antonio Costa on 21 February 2012. Built in Bangkok, the monument was shipped to Lisbon following the same route of Portuguese navigator-diplomat Duarte Fernandes in 1511. The monument reaffirms the diplomatic relations between Thailand and Portugal; Thailand's oldest alliance with a European nation. The red and golden structure is inspired by the Jeronimos Monastery, but follows Thai traditions such as assembly without the use of any metal, nails, or screws, and a roof covered with motifs resembling a dragon's scales. Being only one of four similar structures found outside Thailand, the Sala Thai is one of the most singular monuments in Lisbon.

=== Religious ===
- Jerónimos Monastery (Portuguese: Mosteiro dos Jerónimos) – located along the Praça do Império (Empire Square), across from the Padrão dos Descobrimentos (Monument to the Discoveries), it was originally built to support pilgrims who travelled in the region by Henry the Navigator; expanded and elaborated from 1501 by architects for King Manuel I of Portugal to serve as a resting-place for members of the House of Aviz; and as a church for seafearing adventurers who embarked during the Age of Discovery, after Vasco da Gama's successful voyage to India. Construction was funded by a tax on eastern spices, and over time came to represent Portuguese historical discoveries, becoming over time a national monument and UNESCO World Heritage Site, housing (in addition to the religious art and furniture from its past) artefacts and exhibitions like the Museu Nacional de Arqueologia (National Archaeological Museum) and the Museu da Marinha (Maritime Museum) within its walls.
