= Architecture of the Tejo Power Station =

Coordinates: 38°41′44″N 9°11′41″W

Tejo Power Station architectural ensemble, seen from the Tagus River (Rio Tejo).

The Tejo Power Station is a former coal-fired power station in Belém, Lisbon, built in 1908 and inaugurated in 1909, supplying electricity to the Lisbon region until its closure in 1975.

The complex now houses the Electricity Museum, showcasing industrial architecture from the first half of the 20th century in Portugal.

== Former Tejo Power Station ==
The Tejo Power Station, previously known as the Junqueira Power Station, was a small electricity factory. It was built in 1909 and based on a project by engineer Lucien Neu, with architectural execution carried out by Charles Vieillard and Fernand Touzet. The building had a modernist aesthetic and ornamentation on its north and south facades. On the building's western side, three industrial naves housed the boilers. The defining features of this old power plant were the slender chimneys, one in brick and one in iron, in an inverted conical stem shape.

The north and south facades of the central nave, where the generators were located, were decorated similarly to other iron architecture structures, such as train stations and markets, with modernist influences recently seen in Portugal. These were divided into three sections separated by pilasters, small cogged friezes that ran horizontally along them and, crowning the structure, a large broken pediment. The side sections displayed two bays: the smaller topped with a lintel, and the larger finished with a low arch. The central section, larger than the sides, stood out due to its large bay spanning the entire facade from the base to the top, entering the pediment and forcing it up. Engraved in tile on the semi-circular arch's alfiz was the inscription: 1909 / Cªs Reunidas de Gaz e Electricidade / Estação Eléctrica Tejo Power Station (“United Gas and Electric Companies / Tejo Electric Power Station”).

The industrial naves of the old sugar refinery located beside the power station and previously owned by the Companhia de Açúcar de Moçambique (Mozambique Sugar Company) date back to the end of the 19th century. These were purchased when the old Tejo Power Station began to be demolished. It is a small plant with little ornamentation but a very characteristic shape consisting of two longitudinal naves with a mound-shaped roof – a kind of central tower that functioned as a silo – and four transversal naves on the western side, covered with a gable roof. All bays were protected by a brick frame and are finished with a low arch.

== Current Tejo Power Plant ==
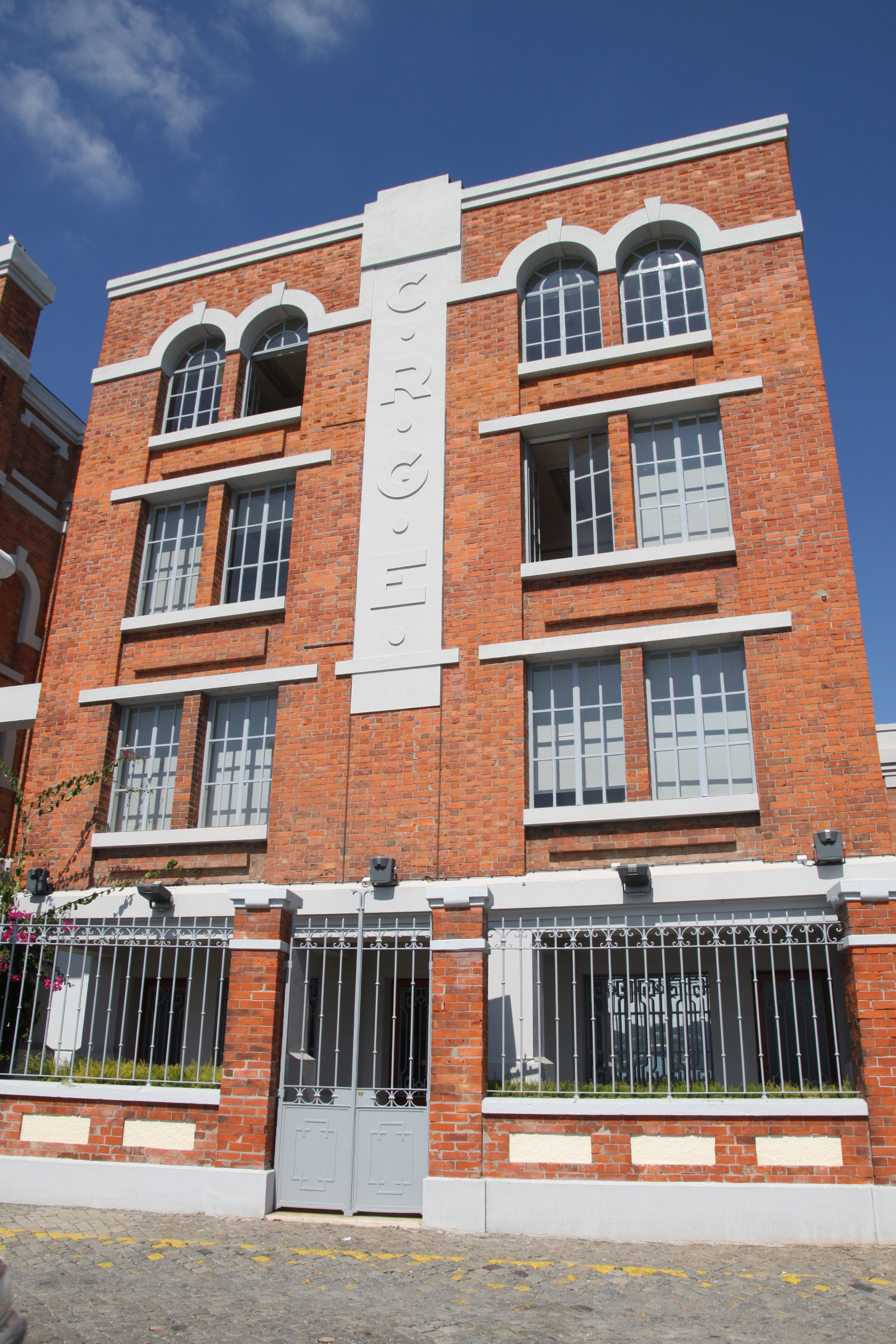
Low Pressure Building.

=== Low-Pressure Phase ===
Construction on the Low-Pressure Building began in the middle of the 1910s, although several expansions were carried out until 1930. The building had early Modernist style architectural elements. It had an iron structure with the characteristic brick cladding, which was used in the High-Pressure Building as well.

The old Boiler Room is made up of four industrial naves, three of them identical and the fourth on a larger scale, covered with gable roofs creating a single diaphanous space inside. On the eastern side, and placed across these, there are two more naves that follow the same modernist aesthetic, although the furthest nave (the substation's building) doesn't have a gable roof.

The relatively low facades stand out due to their large vertical windows finished with semi-circular arches. Above these, a kind of pediment with an accented trim and a lintel closes the space. Under all this, a flat base where the brick is hidden, decorated with low arch frames simulating openings, “supports” the rest of the entire facade.

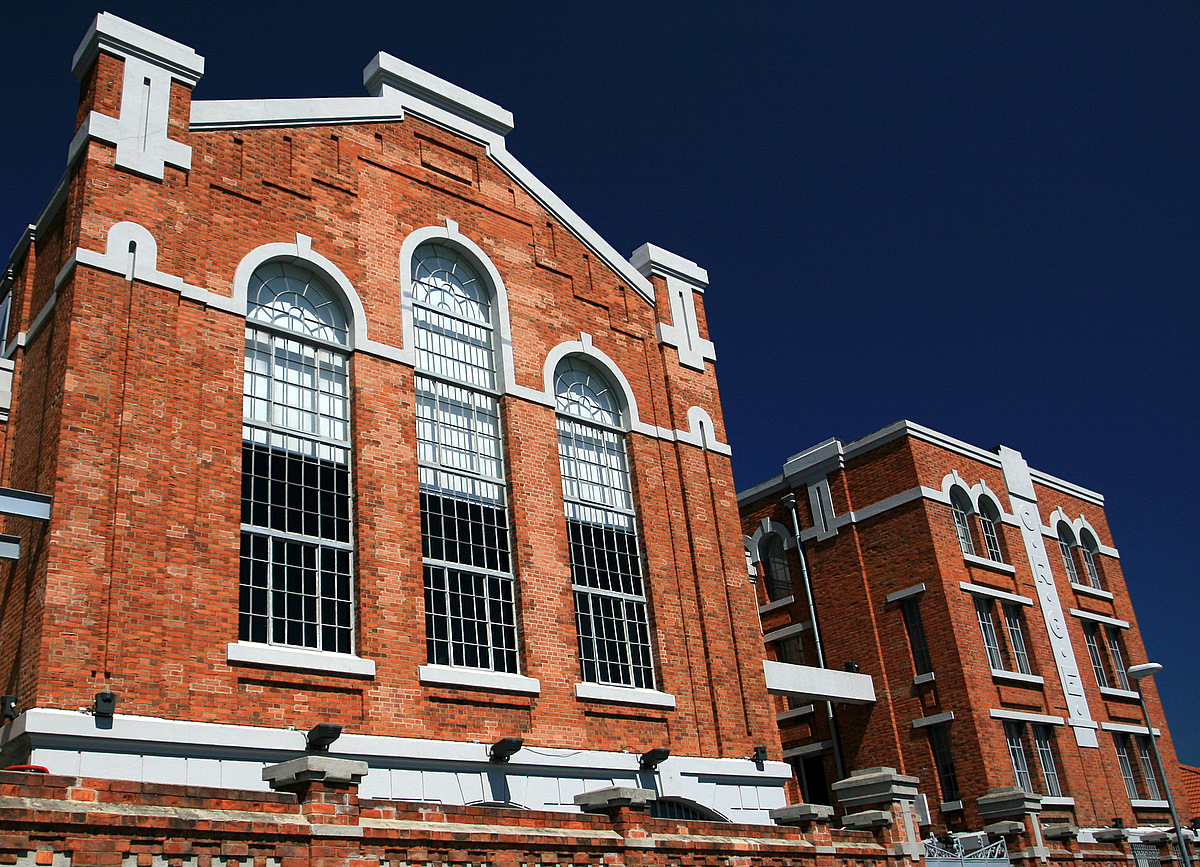
Machinery Room building (left).

The Machinery Room's facade displays the most decorative motifs and modernist elements, similar to the original Tejo Power Station and most of the electric power stations at the time. At its base, there are some differences in comparison with the other facades. The wall is covered in carved stone, except for the lower layers which are in unfinished stone, and above the arched openings, a keystone.

At the brick level, there are also three large windows that finish in semi-circular arches, the middle window being a little larger than the others, and a continuous frame with a keystone at the top of the arches, which spans the entire facade to the building's sides. The top of the facade, also formed by a broken pediment, displays decorative frames made from brick, simulating Lombard bands. On the facade's extremities, pilasters that originate at the base rise to the pediment, reminiscent of two small towers on church facades.

The longitudinal facades display a harmonious composition divided into three areas separated by large pilasters. Each of these areas has three large vertical windows adorned with a continuous frame that spans the entire side. Above each of these windows there is a smaller square window, a kind of frieze that crowns the building's side.

=== High Pressure Phase ===
High Pressure Building, at left.

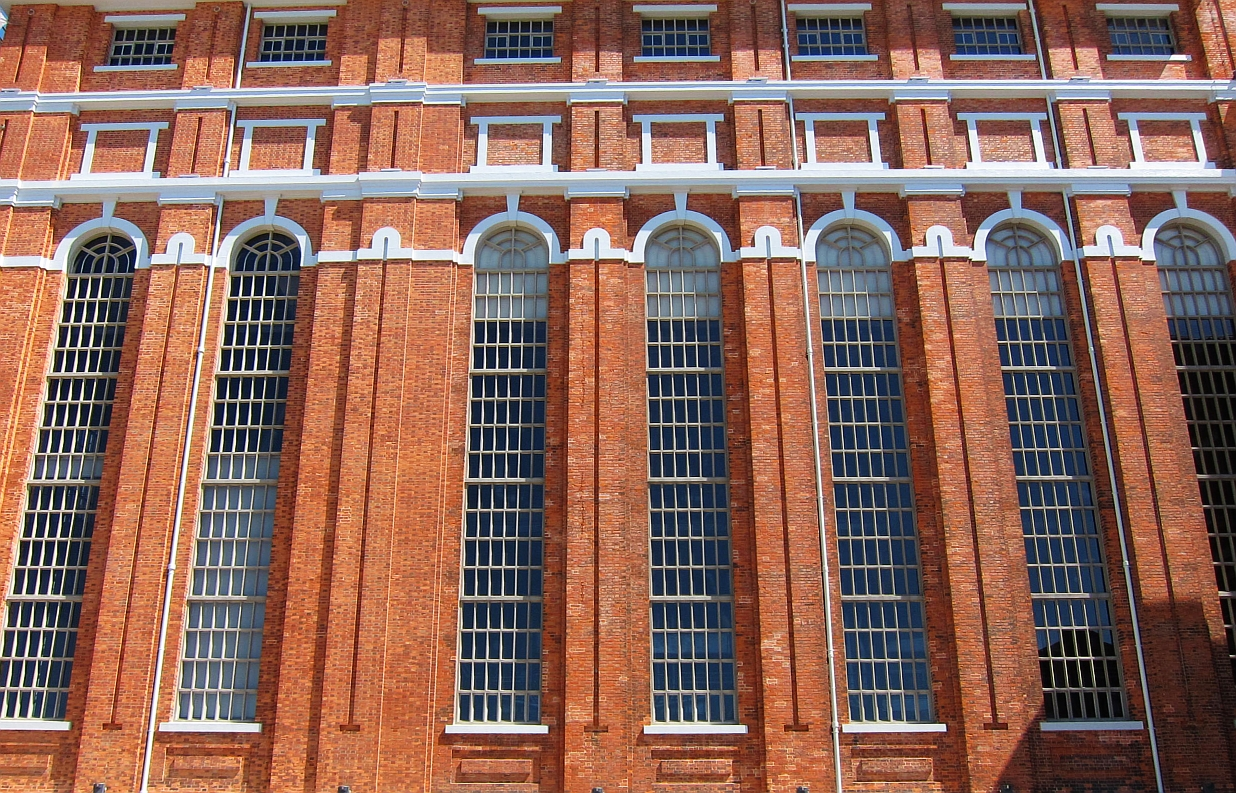
Facade details.

In the High Pressure Building, the decorative motifs are influenced by classicist aesthetic. However, the same brick cladding aesthetic is repeated. In the building's interior, similar to what is seen in the Low Pressure Boiler Room, the ceiling separating the Ash Room from the Boiler Room is covered in semi-circular vaults, with the High Pressure Building using precast concrete instead of tile similar to the Low Pressure Phase building.

The building was built in the 1940s with classical influences from Renaissance palaces as well as of the Fascist system that ruled Portugal at the time. This building, a model of iron architecture in Lisbon, sustains the entire brick cladding, the boilers, the chimneys and the water reservoir located at the top of the building. Aesthetically, the facade follows the models of a Renaissance palace, divided into base, pilasters and entablature. The main body displays large windows that end in semi-circular arches with a keystone, outlined with a frame that runs the entire length of the facade. Between the windows, there are large pilasters that span the entire facade from the bottom of the base to the top of the entablature.

The upper entablature has two independent friezes. The lower is decorated with blind arcades, marked by frames. The upper entablature displays the same organization, but with the spaces outlined by frames formed by windows. A small tower stands out in the section closer to the Low Pressure Building and, above everything else in the complex including the High Pressure boilers’ four chimneys, and at their bases, the entire smoke extraction and air recovery system.

== See also ==
- Tejo Power Station — all topics
- Museu da Electricidade
