= Cordoaria Nacional =

Former naval rope-making factory in Belém, Portugal

Coordinates: 38.6975°N 9.1903°W

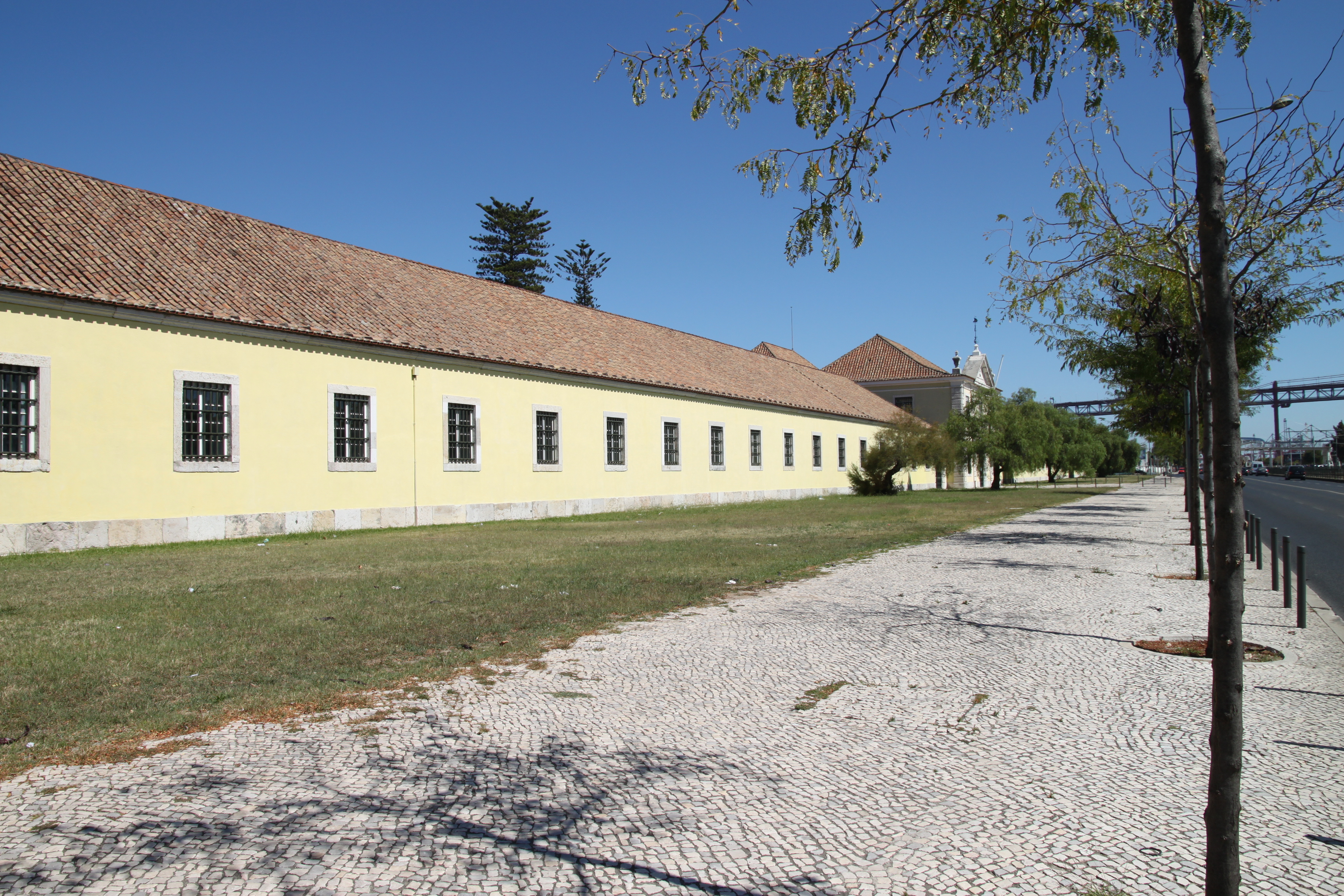
Cordoaria Nacional:Former rope-making factory in Lisbon, now an exhibition centre

The Cordoaria Nacional was a former naval rope-making factory in Belém, Lisbon District, Portugal. It now functions as an exhibition centre.

== History ==
The building of the factory, created by an order of the Marquis of Pombal made in 1771, was completed in 1779, probably to the design of the architect Reinaldo Manuel dos Santos. However, rope making was believed to have been started at this location in 1775 in the open air. The building, which extends parallel to the River Tagus, was intended for the production of sisal ropes, cables, sails and other equipment for the Portuguese Navy and other ships. Architecturally it is practically devoid of decoration but it is still considered as an outstanding example of eighteenth century industrial architecture. Its location, next to the river, facilitated supply to vessels based in or visiting Lisbon.

The factory consisted of two parallel buildings of 353.30 meters, the length being necessitated by the cable and rope production process. The building to the south was used for the twisting of ropes to make different types of cables, while that to the north was used for spinning of linen for sails, flags and other nautical equipment. All work was undertaken by hand, with the assistance of hand-operated machines. Workers included blind people, war veterans and even prisoners. The Cordoaria Nacional was responsible for producing the first examples of the current Portuguese national flag, unfurled in public for the first time at the National Flag Festival held on 1 December 1910.

The building has been subject to several changes as a result of fires in the nineteenth and twentieth centuries and the restructuring necessary to convert it to a museum, as well as by the opening of a road and railway between it and the river, It ceased to function as a factory only in 1998 and is now used as a space for rotating exhibitions.

== Exhibitions ==
- Body Worlds: Animal Inside Out - Part of Gunther von Hagens's Body Worlds exhibitions, this exhibition, which was held in 2018, showcased a series of plastinated animal sculptures, including a gorilla, a giraffe, an asian elephant, an ostrich, a bactrian camel, a reindeer, a brown bear, a horse, a cow, a bull, a yak, a cheetah, a baboon, an octopus, a squid, a mako shark, a great white shark holding a sea lion in his mouth, a sheep, a goat, a rabbit, a chicken, a crocodile, a dog, a lion pouncing on an oryx from behind, and many others.
