= Pornophonique =

- Origin: Darmstadt, Germany
- Genres: 8-bit electronic
- Years active: 2003–present
- Members: Te; Kai Richter; Felix Heuser

Pornophonique is a German electronic duo from Darmstadt, Germany. It was formed by Kai Richter and Felix Heuser. They use a Commodore 64 and a Game Boy to produce their trademark 8-bit electronica sound. While guitarist and singer Richter also handles the C64, Heuser is responsible for the Game Boy sounds. They describe themselves as “Gameboy [sic] meets Lagerfeuer” (Game Boy meets campfire).

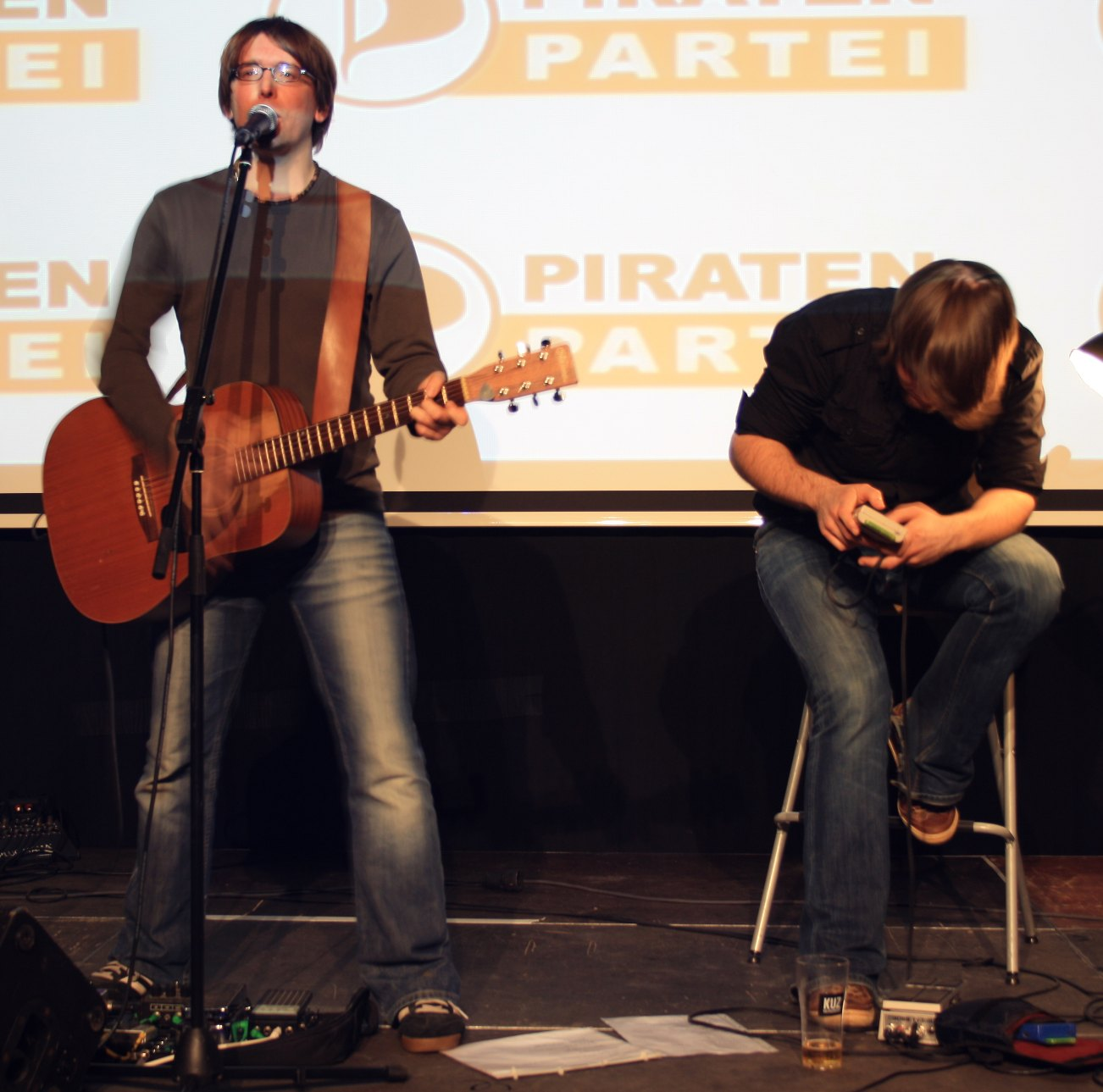
Election party of the Pirate Party 2009 in Mainz (Germany).

In 2003, both decided to start a project called Pornophonique, but due to the little response from labels, Richter and Heuser decided to provide their music on the Internet for free.

In 2007 they released their debut album 8-bit Lagerfeuer which includes eight songs about topics like sad robots and the loneliness in the dungeon of a computer role-playing game. Pornophonique performed at more than 100 concerts in five countries (Austria, Germany, the Netherlands, Switzerland and Portugal).

== Discography ==
- 2007: 8-bit Lagerfeuer (Album)
- 2020: Brave New World (Album)
- 2020: Bite It You Scum (Single)
- 2023: Lagerfeuerlieder Vol. I (Album)
