= National Museum of Ancient Art =

Coordinates: 38°42′16″N 9°09′42″W

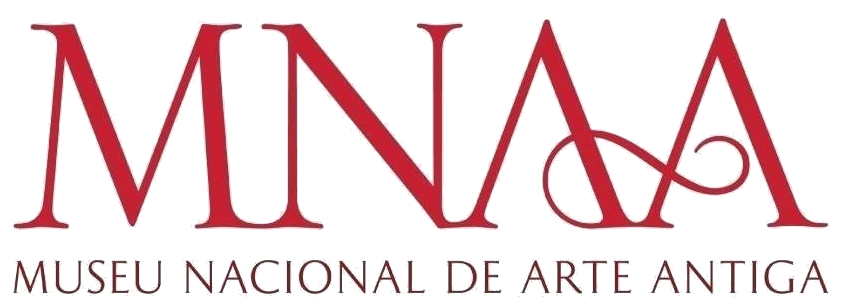

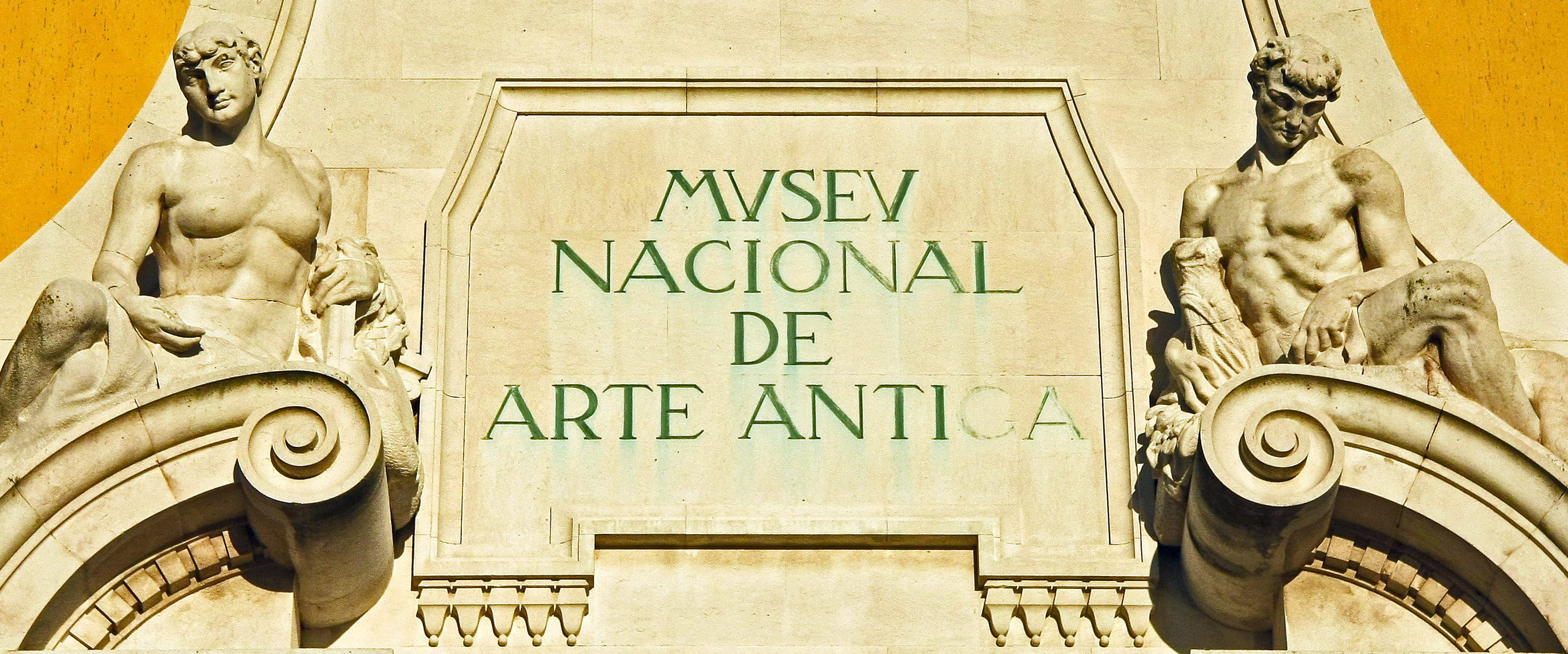
- Established: 1884; 142 years ago
- Location: Lisbon, Portugal
- Type: Art Museum
- Visitors: 423,054 (2018)
- Director: Joaquim Oliveira Caetano
- Website: museudearteantiga.pt

The Museu Nacional de Arte Antiga (Portuguese pronunciation: [muˈzew nɐsiuˈnal dɨ ˈaɾtɐ̃ˈtiɣɐ]; MNAA), also known in English as the National Museum of Ancient Art, is a Portuguese national art museum located in Lisbon. With over 40,000 items spanning a vast collection of painting, sculpture, goldware, furniture, textiles, ceramics, and prints, MNAA is one of the most visited museums in Portugal. The official English translation of "Antiga" as "Ancient" is a misleading difference of idiom; the museum's collection only includes pieces from the Middle Ages and later. It has been closed for renovation since 29 September 2025 and it will re-open 21 November 2026 at 15:00.

The MNAA was founded in 1884 to display the collections of the Portuguese royal family and the National Academy of Fine Arts. It is housed in the Palácio Alvor-Pombal, a former residence of the 1st Marquis of Pombal which was expanded when it was converted into a museum. The museum's collection spans more than a millennium of art from Europe, Asia, Africa, and the Americas and includes notable artworks by Hieronymus Bosch, Raphael, Hans Holbein the Elder, Francisco de Zurbarán, Albrecht Dürer, Domingos Sequeira, and Giambattista Tiepolo, among numerous others.

== History ==
=== Origins ===
Portuguese civil architecture building

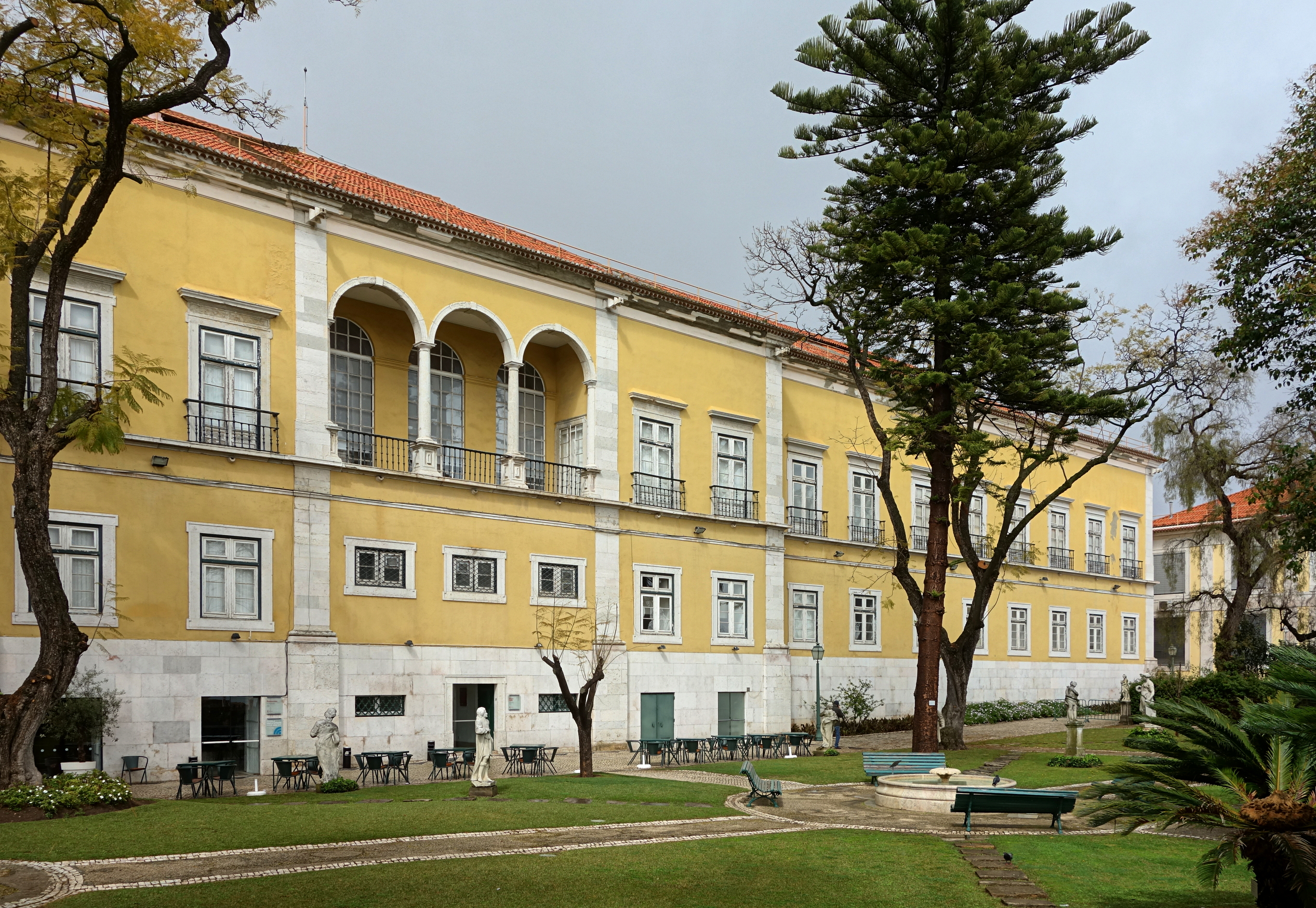
Gardens of the Alvor-Pombal wing of the MNAA, facing the Tagus river.

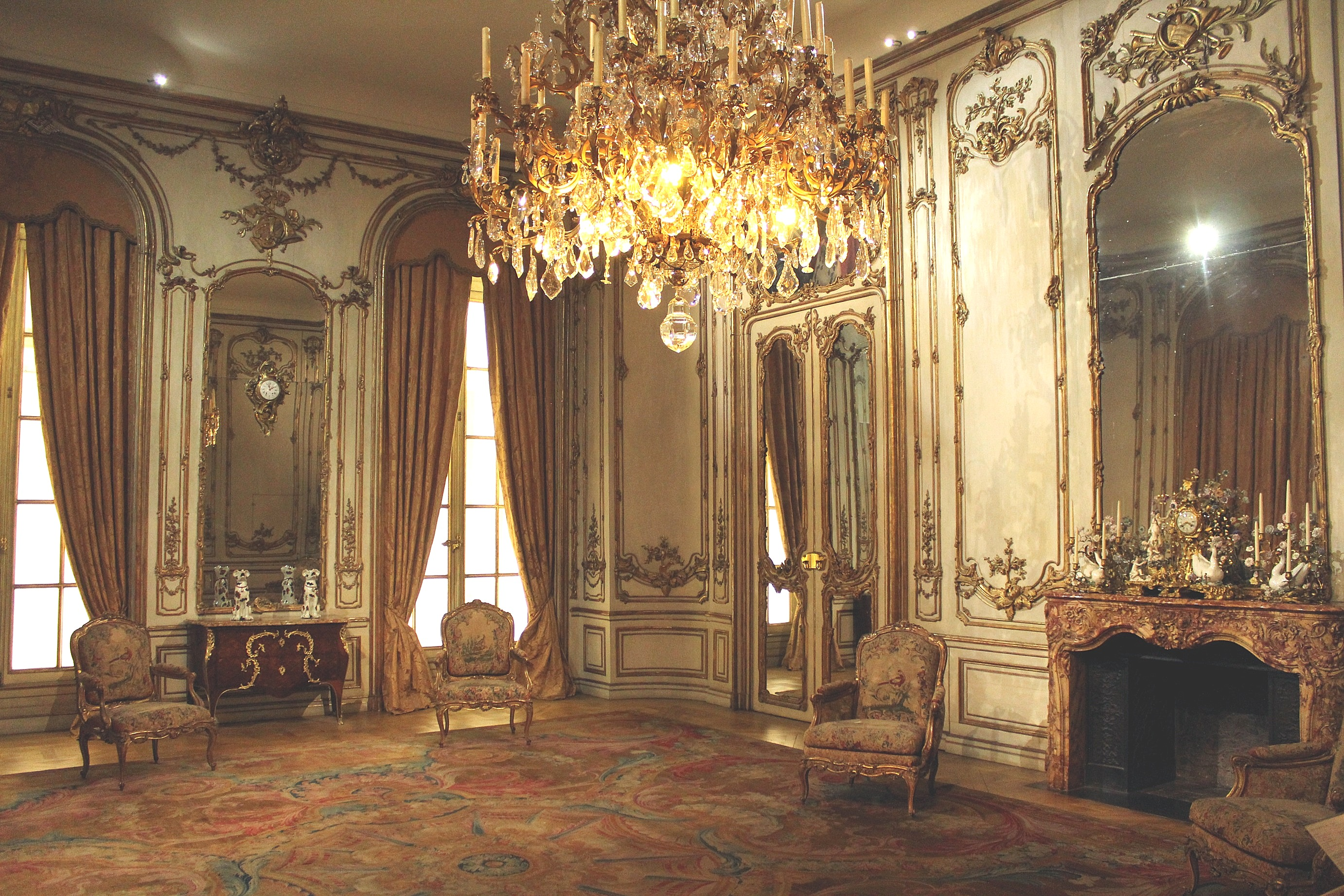
The Sala Patiño (Patiño Room).

The museum has its roots in the 1833 abolition of religious orders and confiscation of the monasteries in Portugal, which brought a trove of religious art and ornaments into the public sphere. At the instigation of the liberal politician Passos Manuel, the Academia de Bellas Artes ("Academy of Fine Arts") was founded in 1836, and established its headquarters at the former monastery of São Francisco da Cidade (near the Chiado). Although primarily dedicated to nurturing new artists, that same year, the Academia founded the Galeria Nacional de Pintura ("National Gallery of Painting") on the lower levels of the same building, as a subsidiary division to select, care for and display some of the better pieces of the expropriated monastic art then in government storage. An Academia panel selected some 540 paintings for the Galeria. Predictably, most of these were religious-oriented pieces of Portuguese origin.

In the chaos and aftermath of the Portuguese Liberal Wars, some of the private art collections of ruined noble families were expropriated or found their way on to the market. Of particular significance was the painting collection of the disgraced former queen, the late Carlota Joaquina, which was acquired by the Portuguese government and given to the Academia in 1859. The former king Ferdinand II of Portugal, a connoisseur of fine arts, took an interest in the budding organization, secured its royal sponsorship (it was renamed Academia Real de Belas Artes in 1862) and, in 1865–67, Ferdinand II made a series of substantial cash donations, giving the Galeria an independent acquisition budget, enabling it to purchase pieces on the art market.

On the initiative of Francisco de Sousa Holstein (son of the 1st Duke of Palmela, a vice-inspector of the Academia Real, in 1868, the Galeria's rooms were remodelled into a better exhibition space for its expanding collection and opened to the general public. Nonetheless, the facilities remained inadequate - it was terribly humid, cramped and still traversed by unrelated visitors to the Academia (which had, by now, become something of a social hang-out for dissheveled bohemian artists and students). In 1875, a commission headed by Sousa Holstein recommended the founding of a larger and more permanent museum away from the Academia's Chiado building.

In 1881, the Academia's educational division was split off and turned into the Escola Real de Belas-Artes ("Royal School of Fine Arts", now part of the University of Lisbon), with the Academia Real de Belas-Artes proper limited to cultural pursuits.

In 1881, Academia officer Delfim Guedes rented the 17th-century Palace of Janelas Verdes ("Green Windows"), the former Lisbon residence of the Counts of Alvor that had been seized by the Marquis of Pombal after 1759 and sold to his own brother, the Cardinal-Inquisitor Paulo António de Carvalho e Mendonça (thus it is also known as the Palace of Pombal-Alvor). Later sold to the neighboring Carmelite convent of Santo Alberto, the palace returned to private hands following the 1833 dissolution. Guedes intended to use it as a temporary space for an international exhibition on Iberian ornamental art ("Exposição Retrospectiva de Arte Ornamental Portuguesa e Espanhola") organized by the South Kensington Museum (now the Victoria & Albert) in London, that was set to visit Lisbon in 1882.

=== Foundation ===
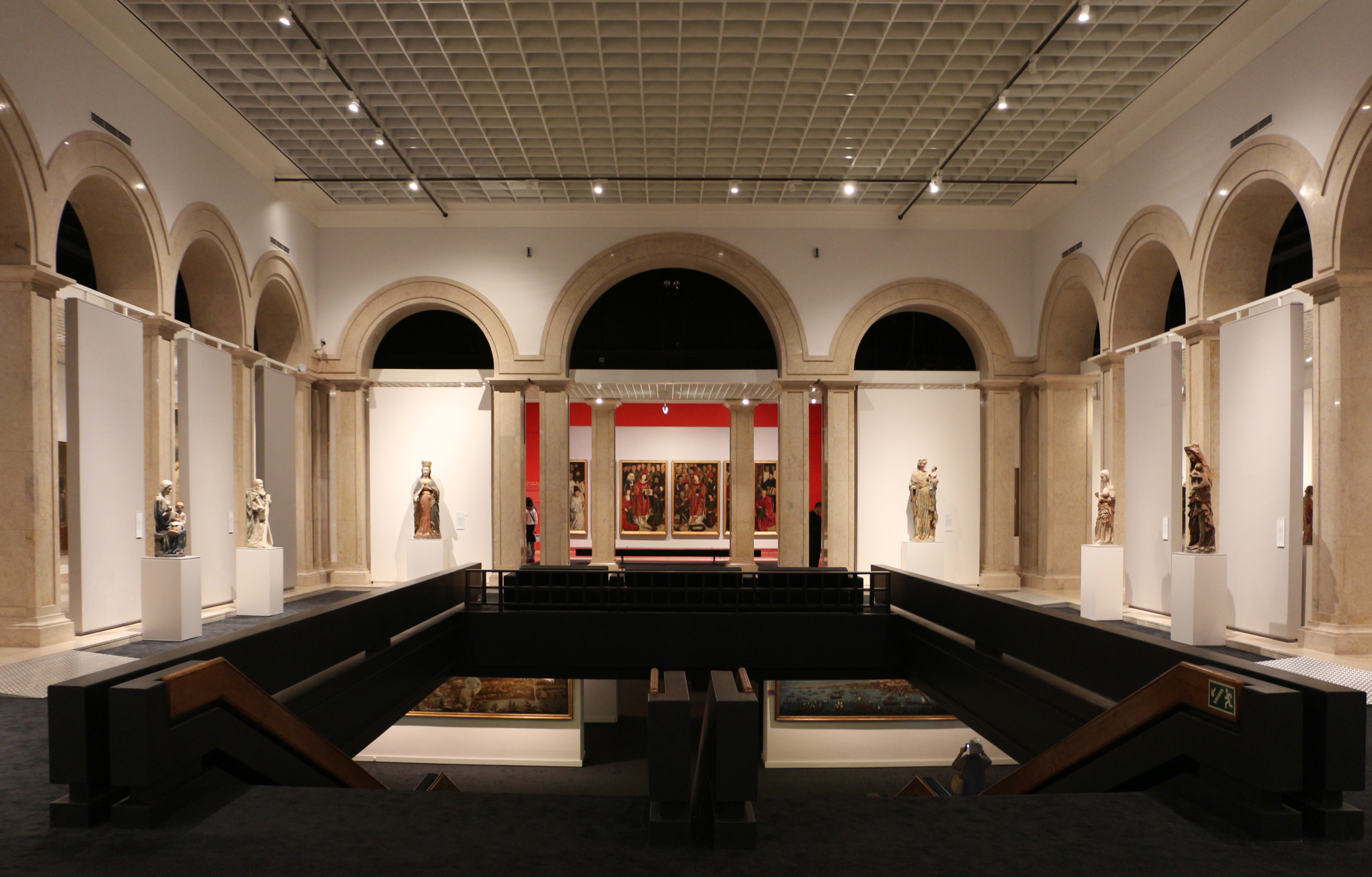
Atrium of the MNAA annex hall.

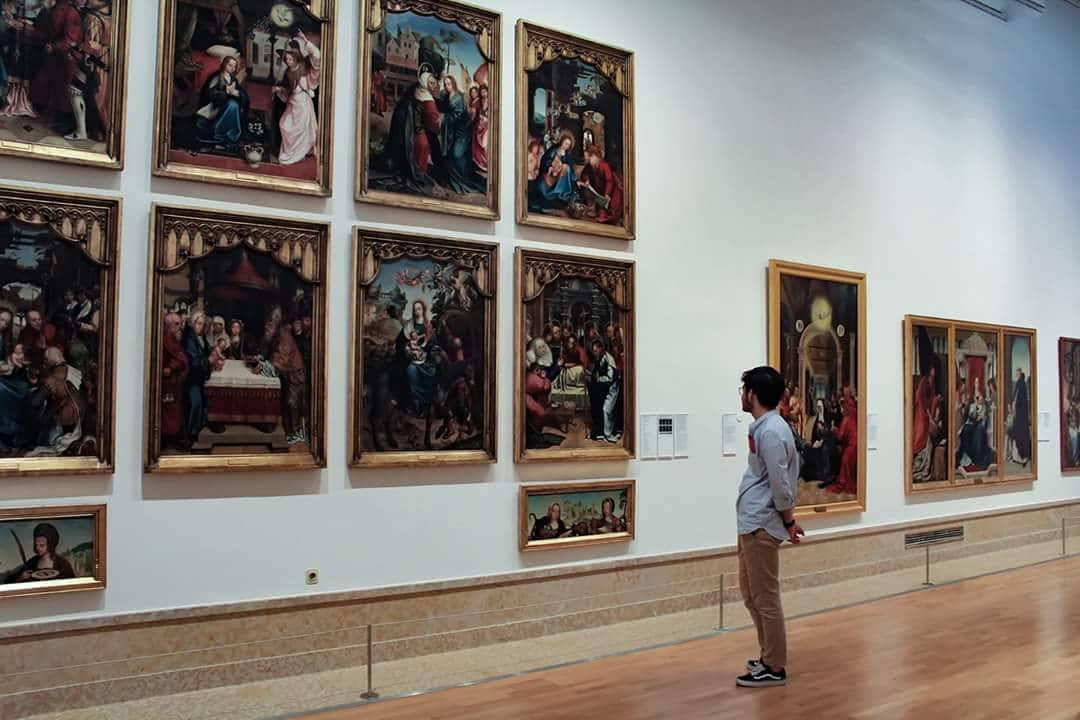
Portuguese Renaissance paintings.

The government formally purchased the Janelas Verdes palace in June, 1884, and recast it as the Museu Nacional de Belas-Artes e Arqueologia ("National Museum of Fine Arts and Archaeology"), formally founded on 11 May 1884, to house what where then known as the "Museus Centrais" of the State and placed it under the management of the Academia Real.

Following the republican 1910 revolution, the arrangement was overhauled and the museum's management stopped depending on the Academia Real (now renamed Academia Nacional de Belas Artes). By a decree of 26 May 1911, the collections were split up and two separate and independent museums created - the Museu Nacional de Arte Antiga ("National Museum of Ancient Art"), at the Palace of Janelas Verdes, and the Museu Nacional de Arte Contemporânea" ("National Museum of Contemporary Art") at the old location of the Academia's Galeria at São Francisco da Cidade (since renamed the Chiado Museum). The latter collection's cut-off date was roughly 1850, everything prior to that assigned to Arte Antiga.

The MNAA's first museum director was the energetic José de Figueiredo, who promptly began reforming the museum based on the latest planning and exhibition principles and re-orienting it decisively towards painting. Figueiredo was the first to study and identify the authorship and significance of Saint Vincent Panels, a 15th-century polyptych discovered c. 1882 and attributed by Figueiredo to Nuno Gonçalves. The St. Vincent panels were installed in the museum by 1916 and remain perhaps its best known piece.

In 1940, the MNAA expanded its installations by acquiring the neighboring old convent of Santo Alberto and turned it into an annex connected by a footbridge. The chapel of the convent, a fine example of 18th Portuguese Baroque art and architecture, was incorporated into the exhibits.

== Collections ==
The collection includes painting, sculpture, metalwork, textiles, furniture, drawings, and other decorative art forms from the Middle Ages to the early 19th century. The collections, especially those for the 15th and 16th centuries, are particularly important regarding the history of Portuguese painting, sculpture, and metalwork.

=== Painting ===
European

The European painting section of the museum is significant and is represented by Jacob Adriaensz Backer, Bartolomé Bermejo, Triptych of the Temptation of St. Anthony by Hieronymus Bosch, Pieter Brueghel the Younger, David Gerard, Saint Jerome in His Study by Albrecht Dürer, Lucas Cranach, Piero della Francesca, Jan Gossaert, Hans Holbein the Elder, Pieter de Hooch, Adriaen Isenbrandt, Quentin Metsys, Hans Memling, Antonis Mor, Joachim Patinir, Jan Provost, Raphael, José Ribera, Andrea del Sarto, David Teniers the Younger, Tintoretto, Anthony van Dyck, Diego Velázquez, David Vinckeboons, Hendrick Cornelisz Vroom, Francisco de Zurbarán, François Boucher, Nicolas Poussin and others.

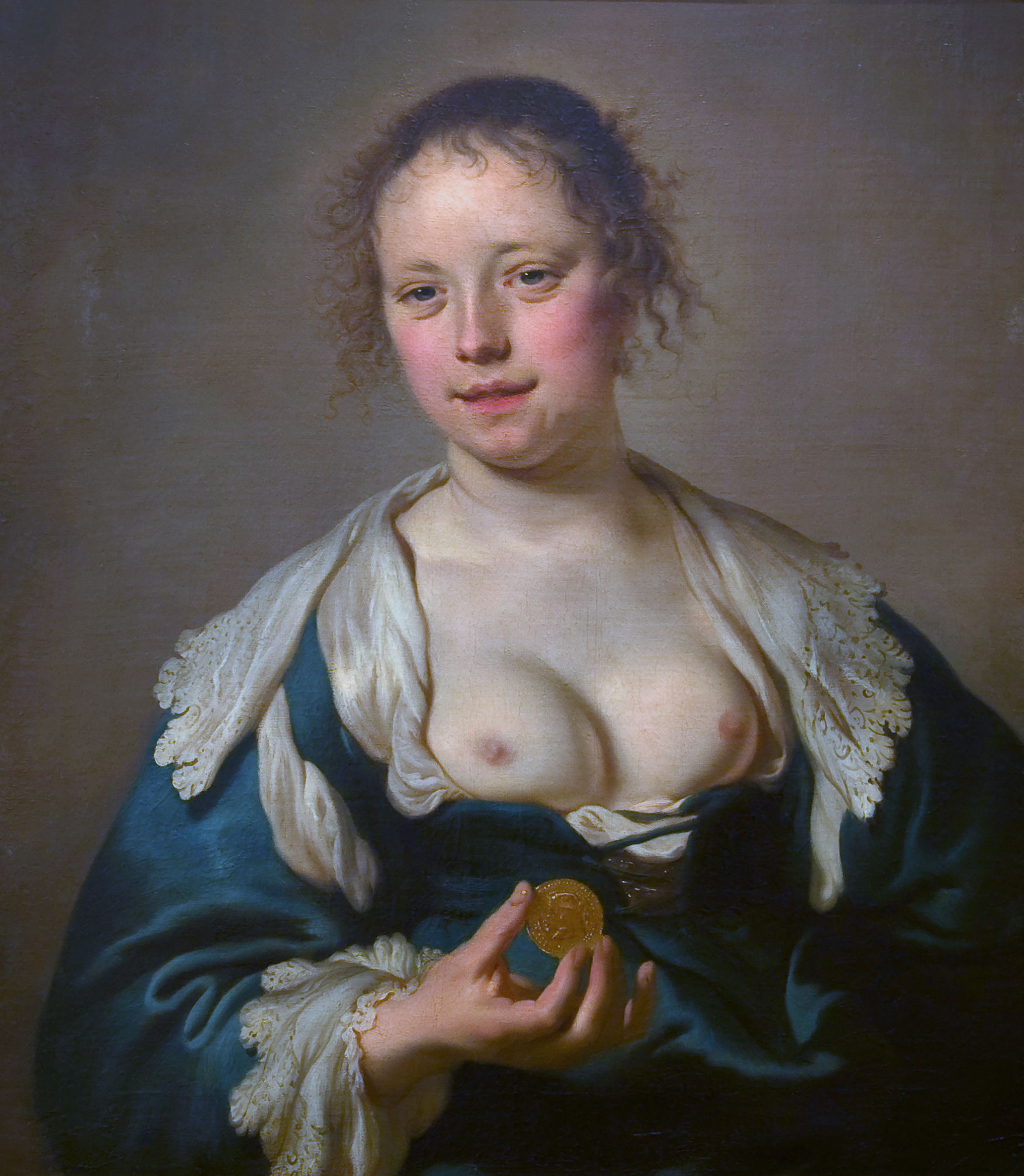
Courtesan by Jacob Adriaensz Backer, 1640.

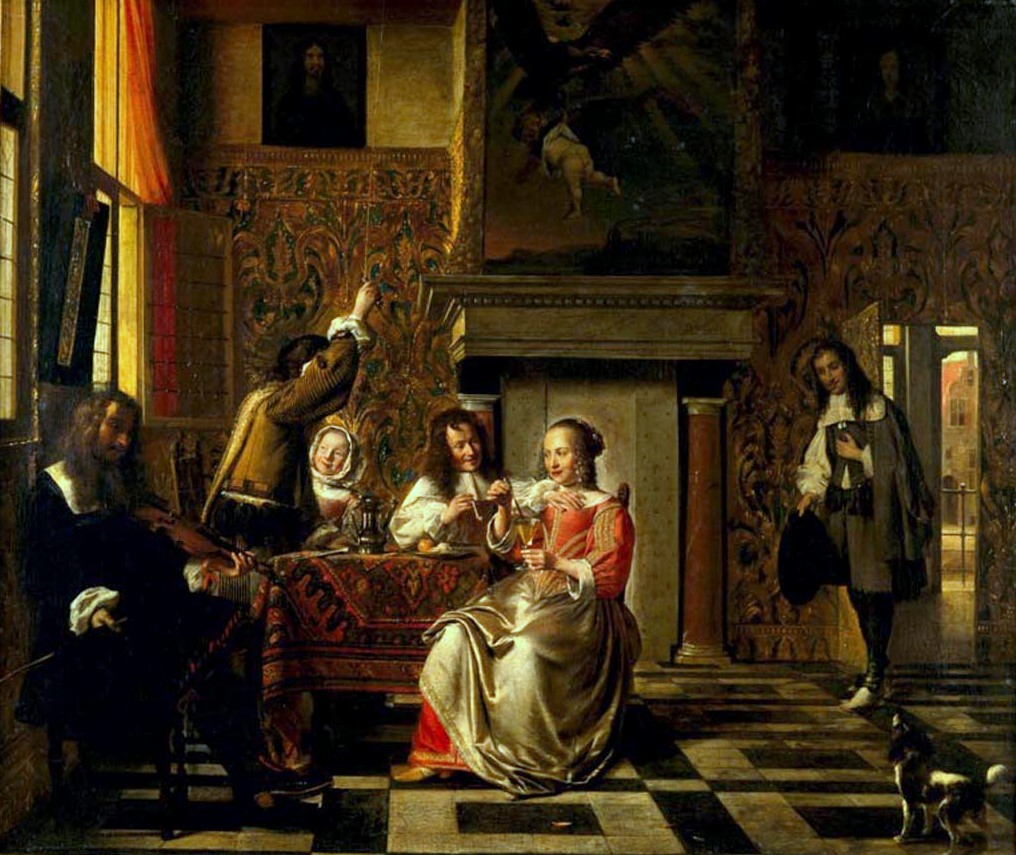
Merry Company by Pieter de Hooch; 1662.

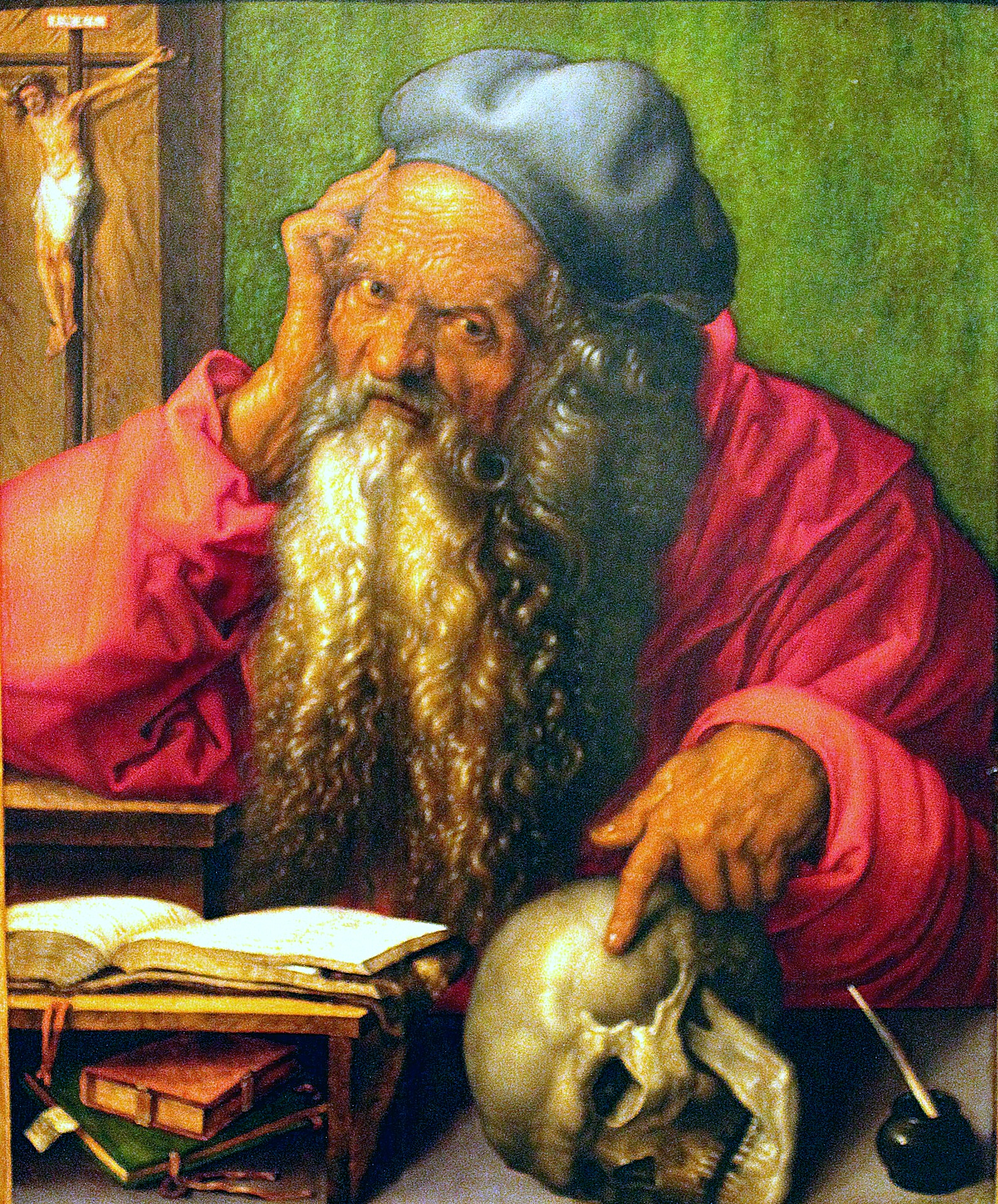
St. Jerome in His Study by Albrecht Dürer; 1521.

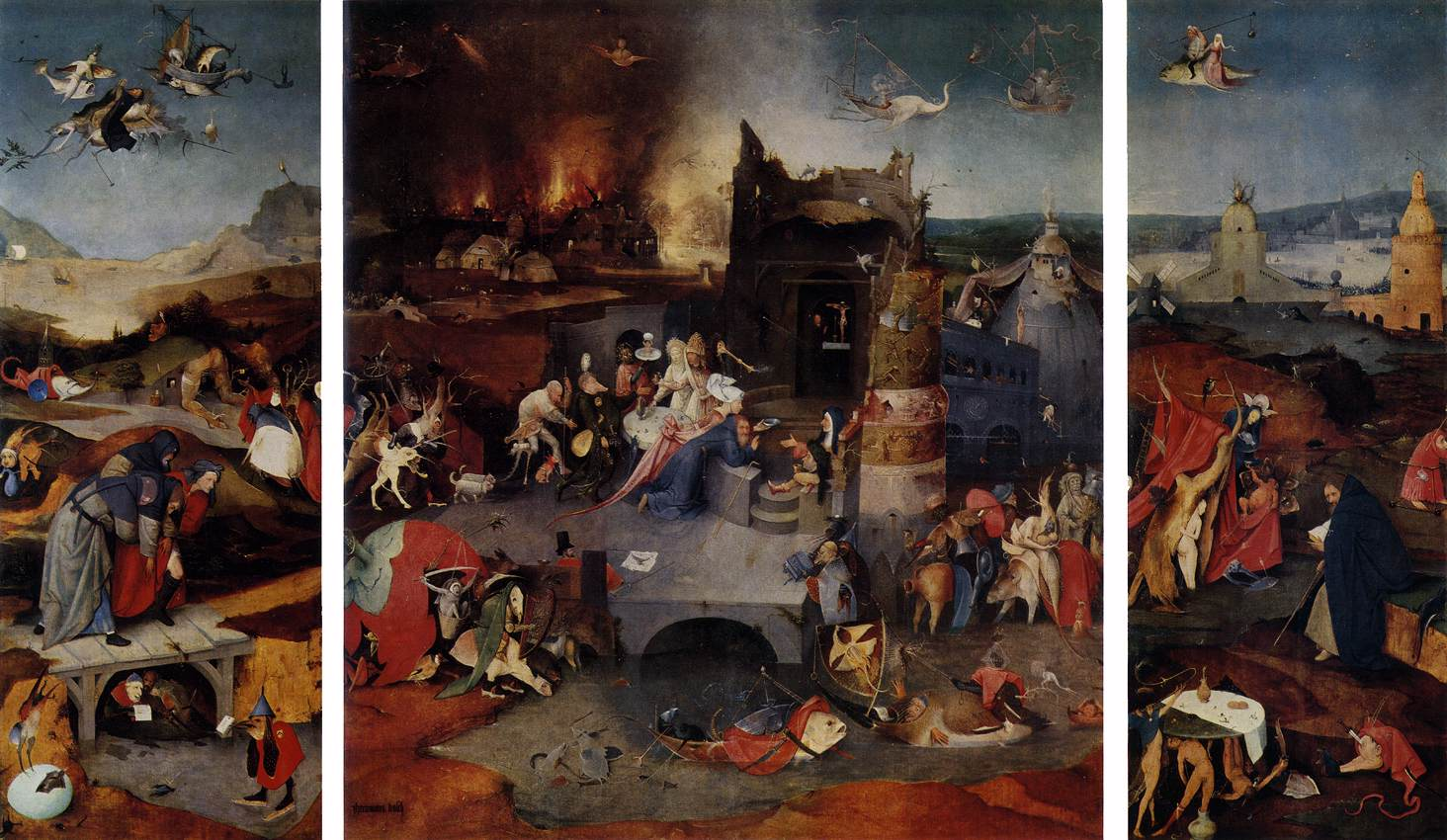
Triptych of the Temptation of St. Anthony by Hieronymus Bosch; c. 1501.

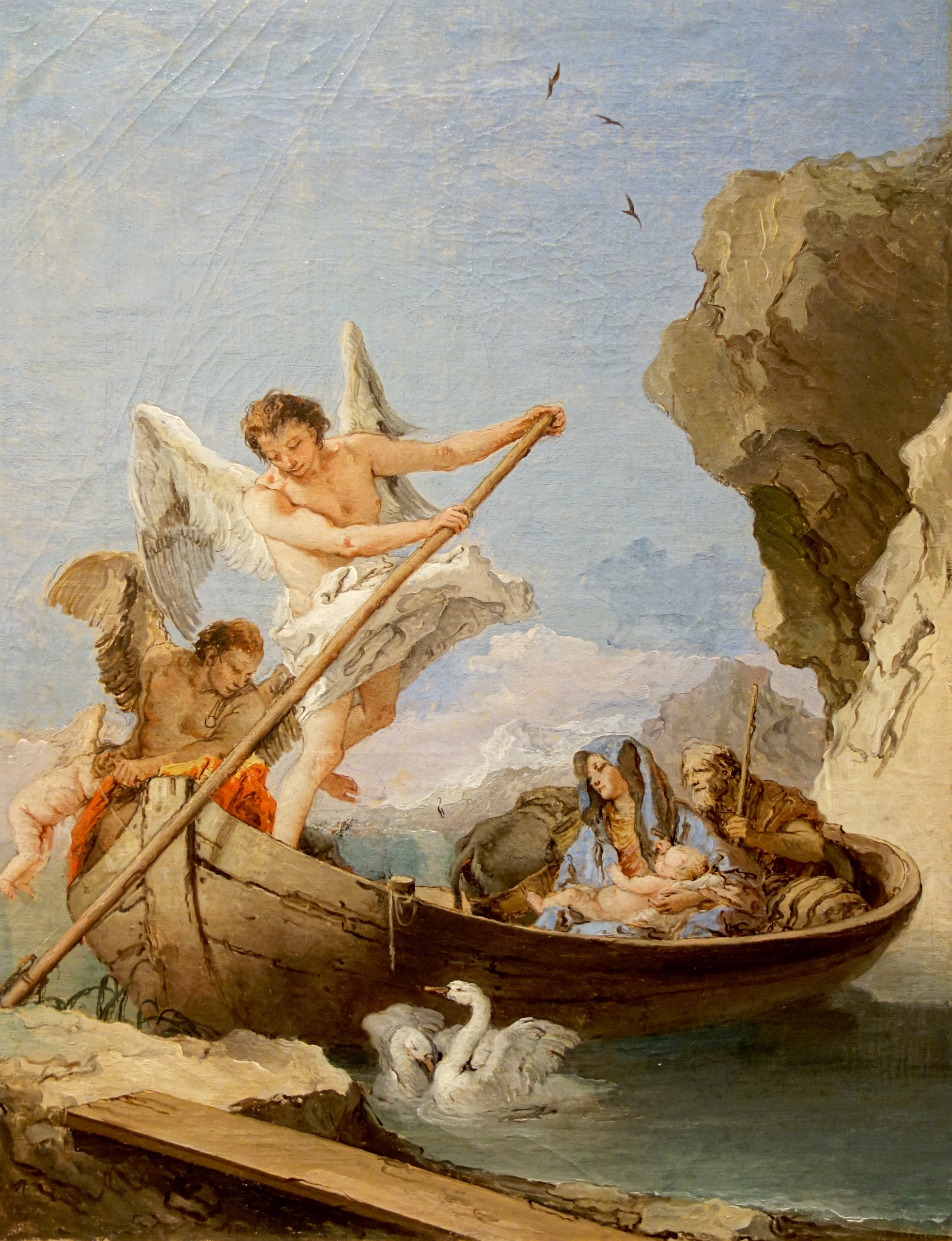
Flight into Egypt by Giambattista Tiepolo; c. 1764–70.

Portuguese

Perhaps the most famous work in the museum is the Saint Vincent Panels, which date from before 1470 and are attributed to Nuno Gonçalves, court painter of King Afonso V. Though the history of the polyptych remains enshrouded in mystery, the six large panels have been argued to portray people from all levels of late medieval Portuguese society venerating Saint Vincent, in what would be one of the first group portraits in European art. There are 60 figures on the panels.

The museum also has important works by early 16th-century painters active in Portugal, such as, Jorge Afonso, Vasco Fernandes, Garcia Fernandes, Francisco de Holanda, Cristóvão Lopes, Gregório Lopes, Cristovão de Figueiredo, Francisco Henriques, and others.

Painting from the 17th through the early 19th centuries is well represented by works that include those of Josefa de Óbidos, Vieira Portuense, and Domingos Sequeira.

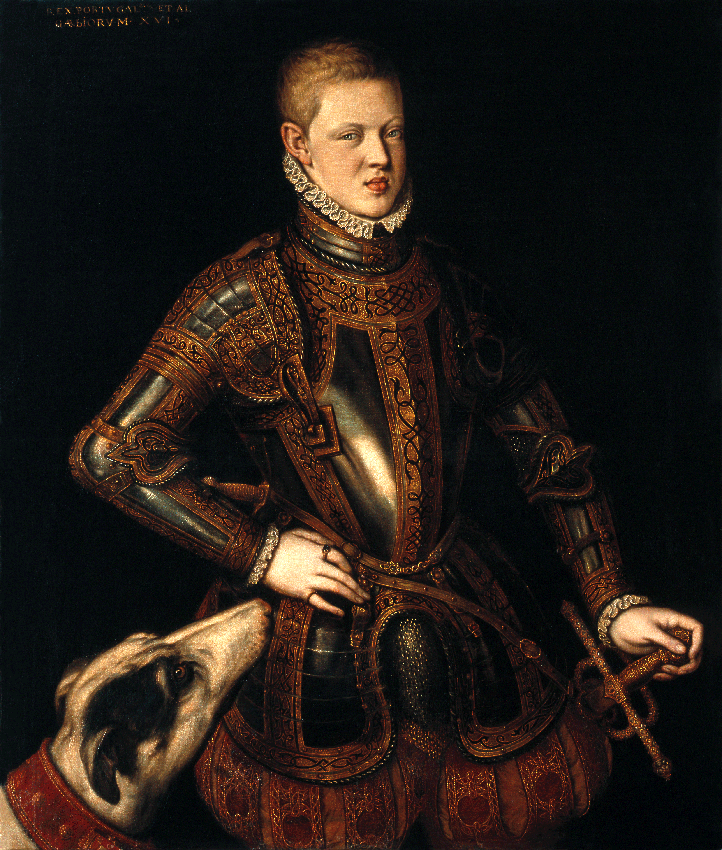
King Sebastian of Portugal by Cristóvão de Morais, 1571–74.

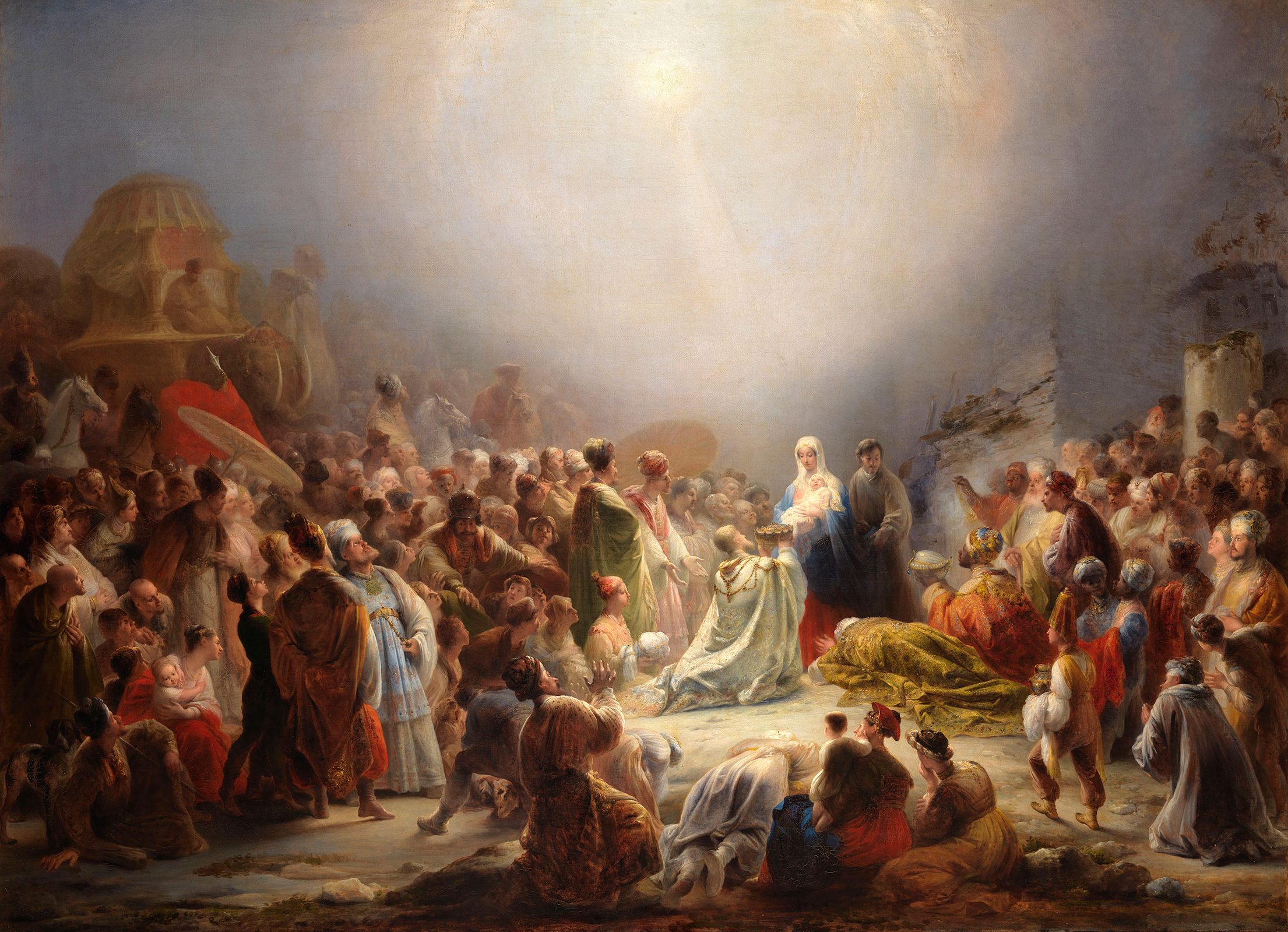
Adoration of the Magi by Domingos Sequeira; 1828.

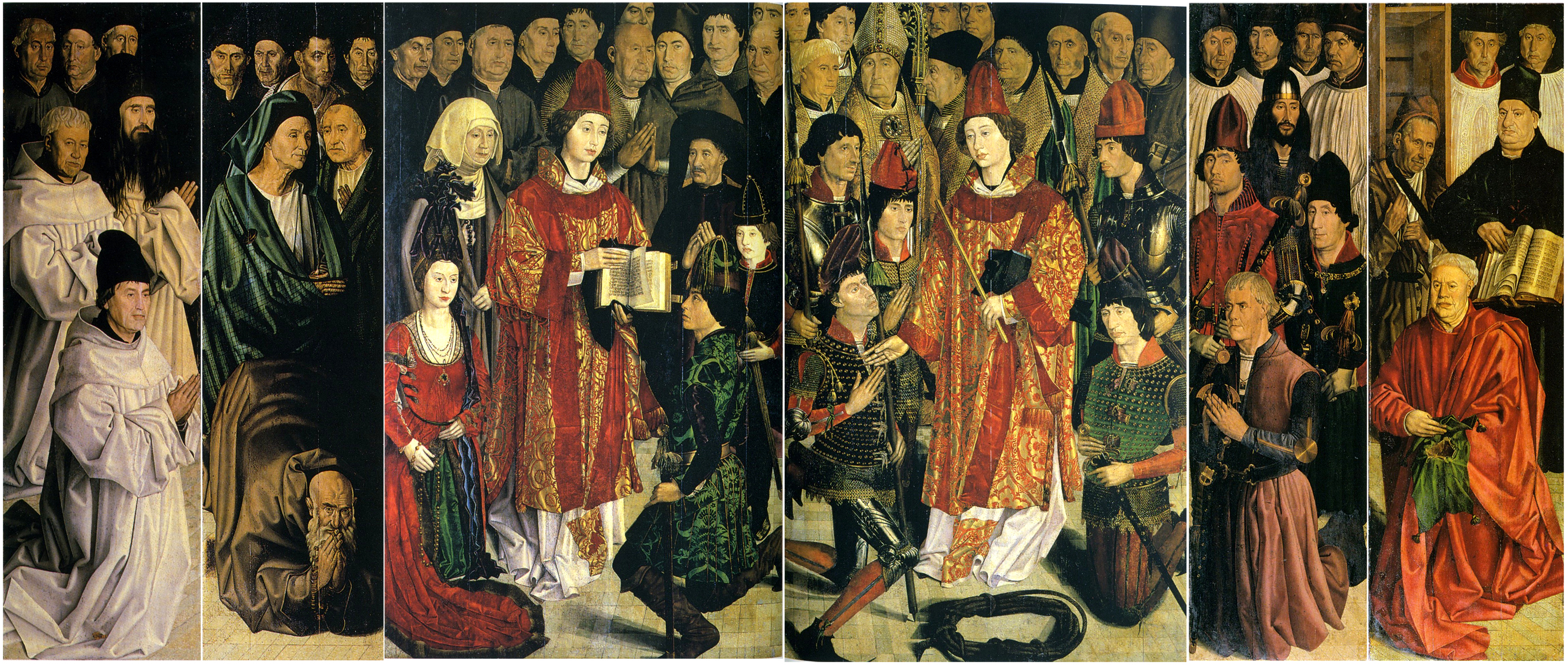
Saint Vincent Panels by Nuno Gonçalves; c. 1450s.

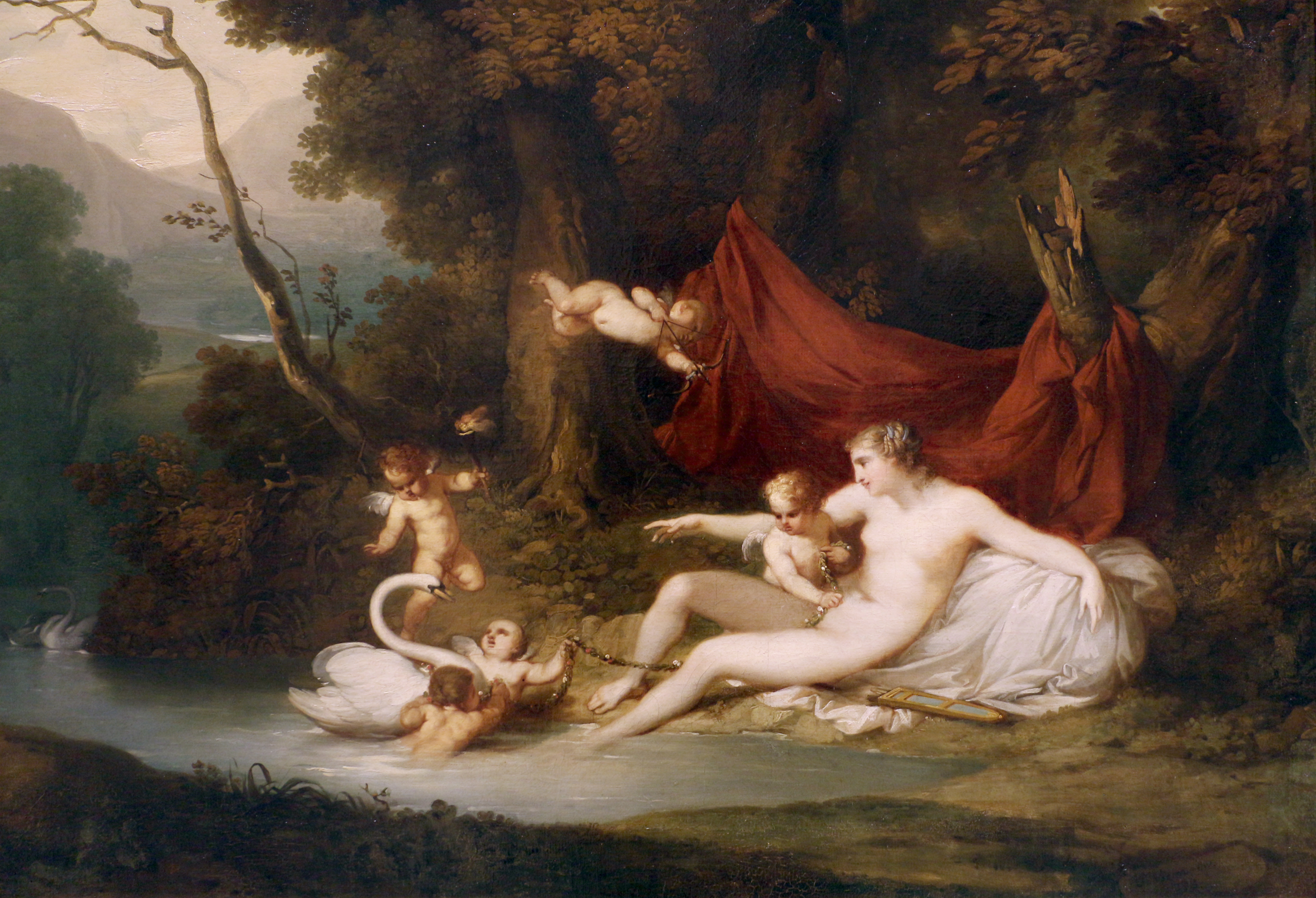
Jupiter and Leda by Vieira Portuense, 1798.

=== Sculpture ===
The MNAA's collection of sculpture spans millennia of statues, figurines, and other pieces, originating in Ancient Rome, Portugal, Italy, Ancient Egypt, Spain, France, Brazil, and England, among other places.

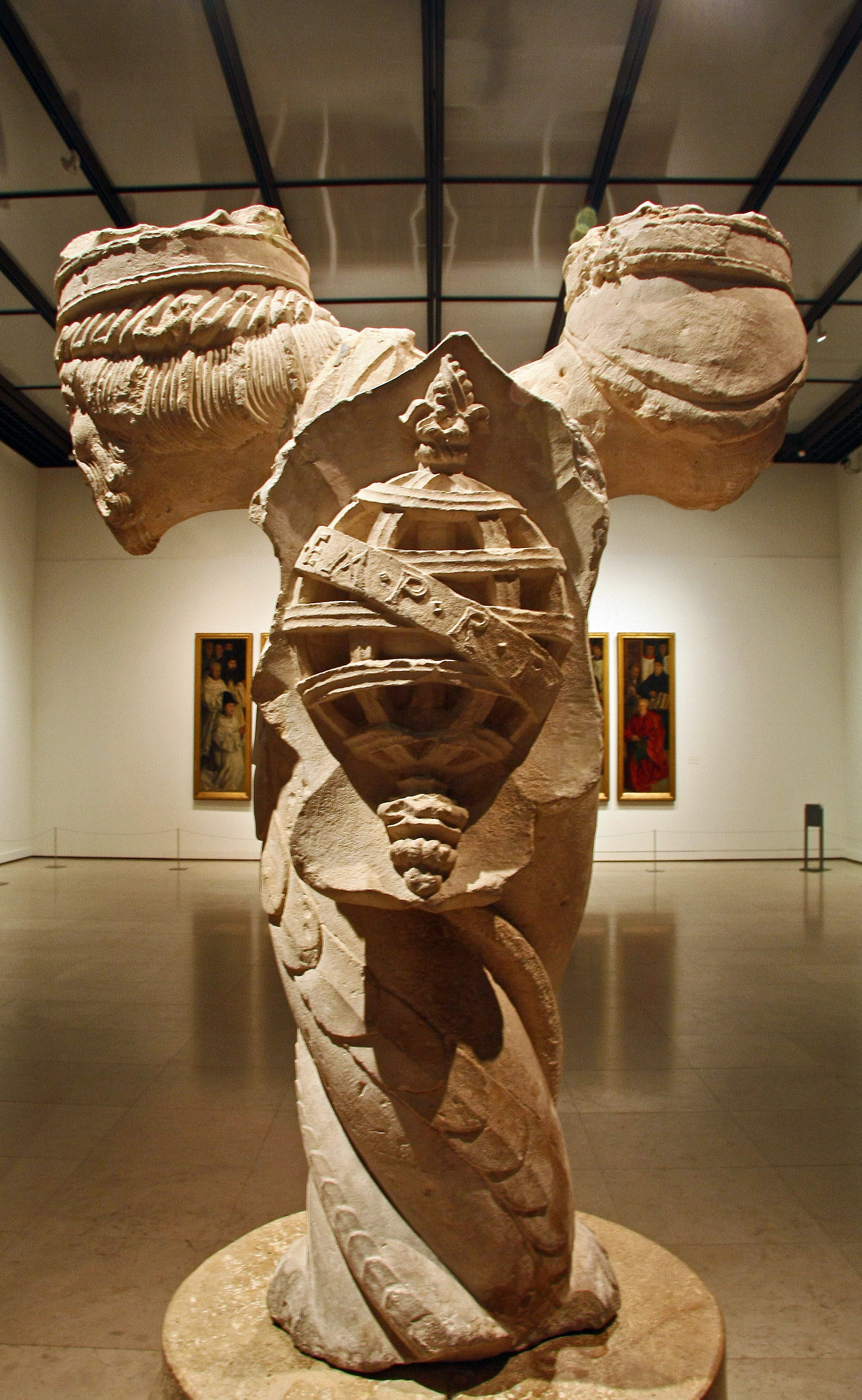
Two-Headed Fountain; 1501–1515.

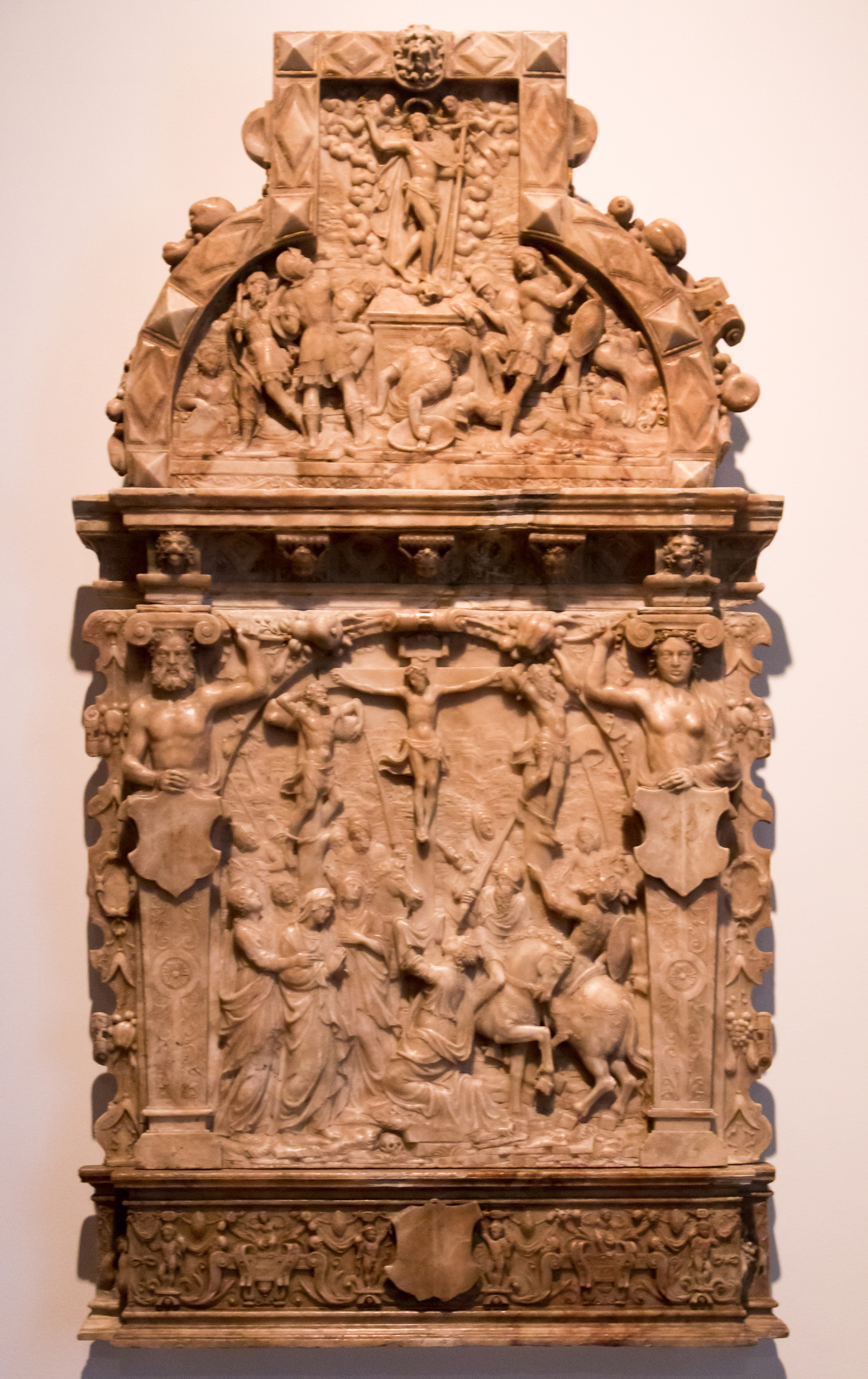
Altarpiece of the Passion of Christ; c. 1550–75.

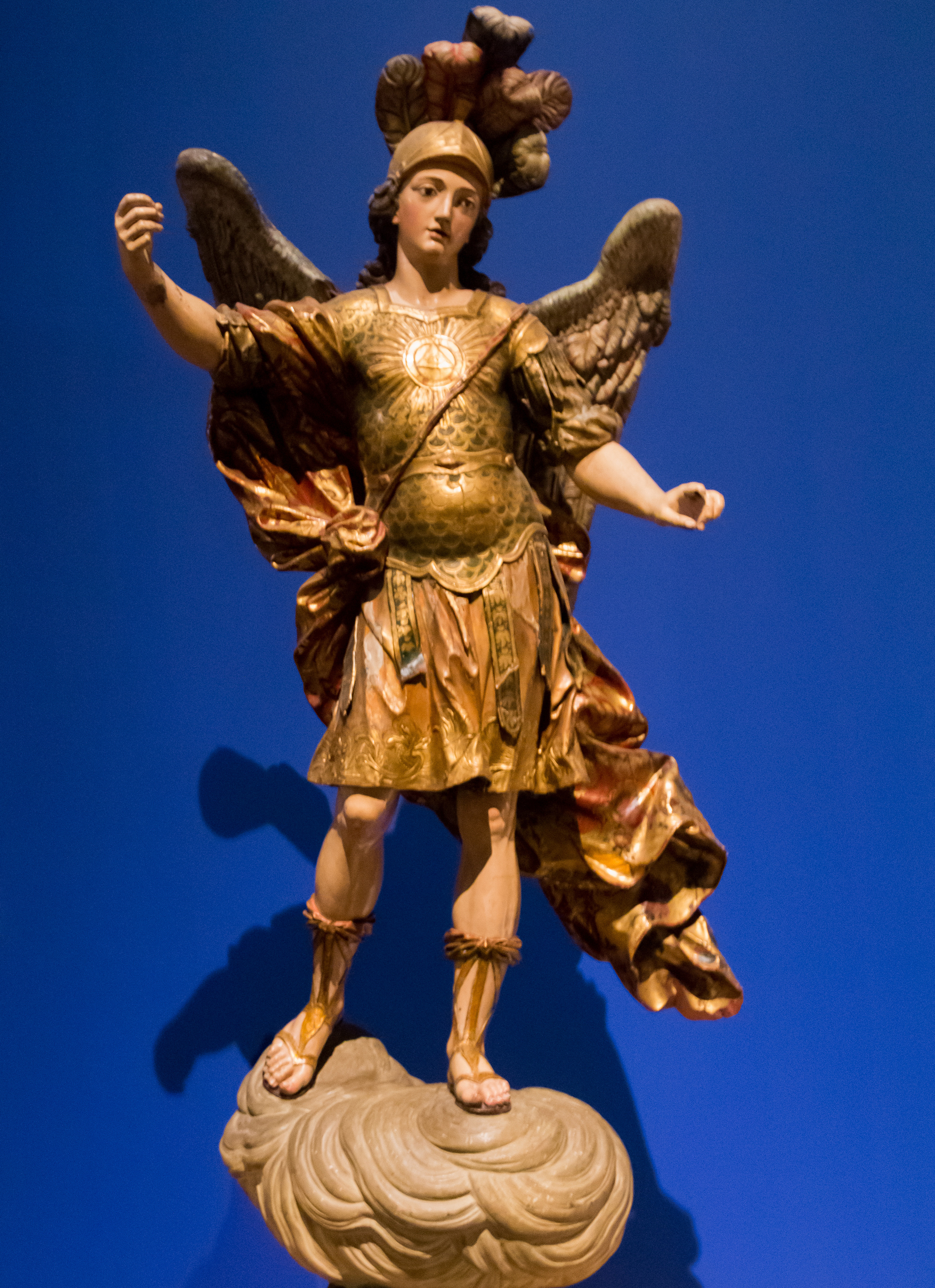
St. Michael Archangel; 17th century.

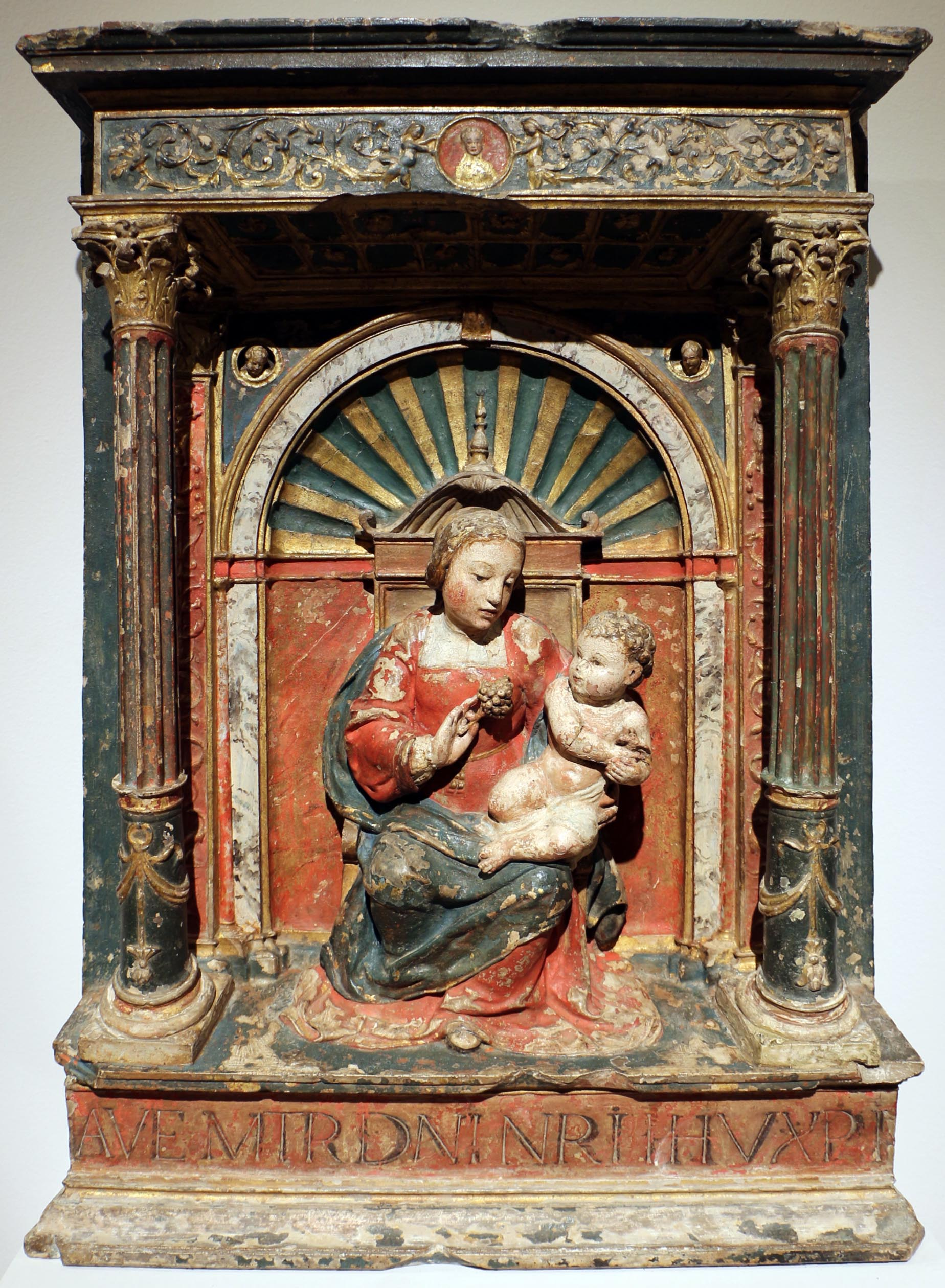
Madonna with Child; 1525–50.

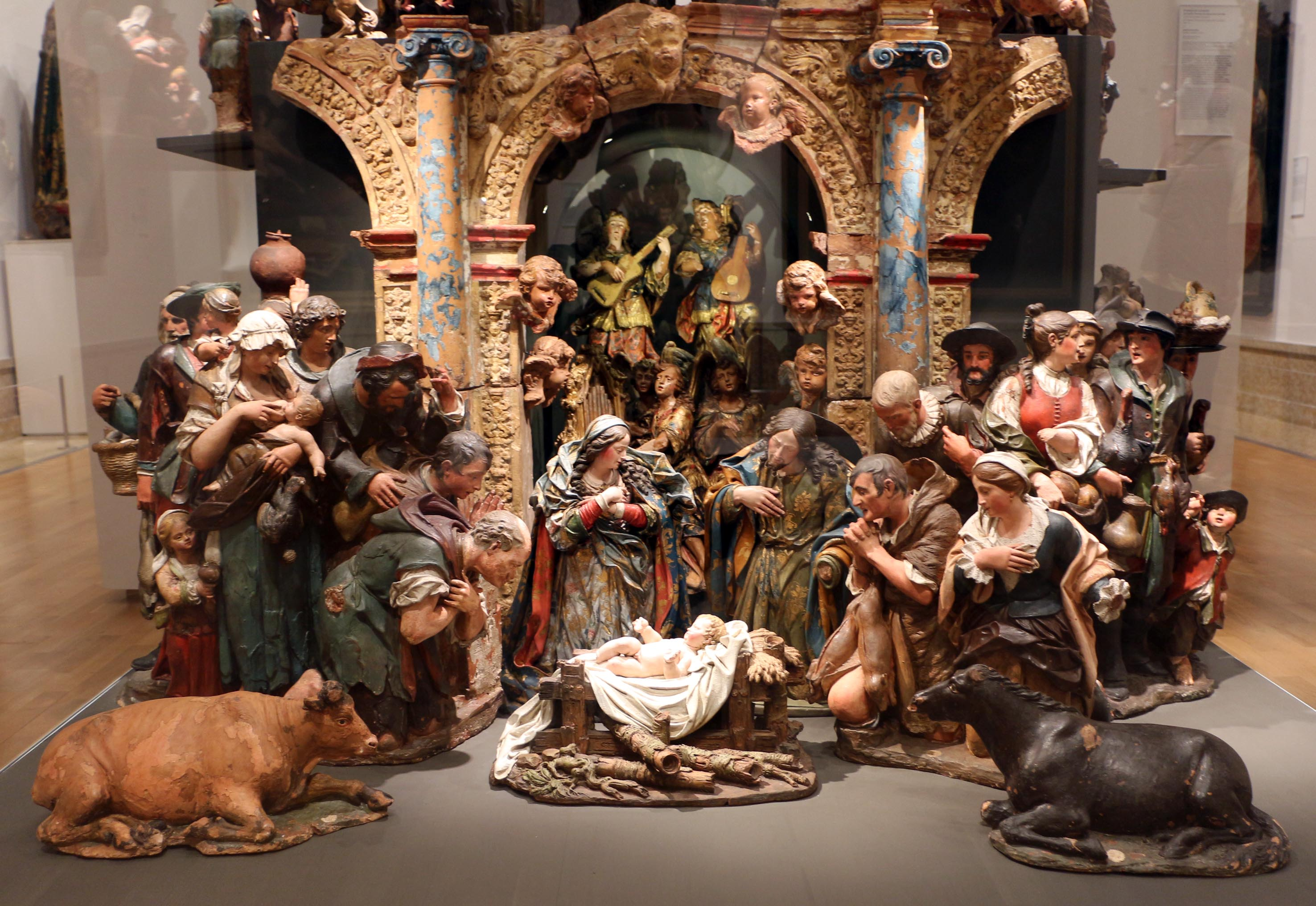
Santa Teresa visiting Jesus in the crib; 1701–25.

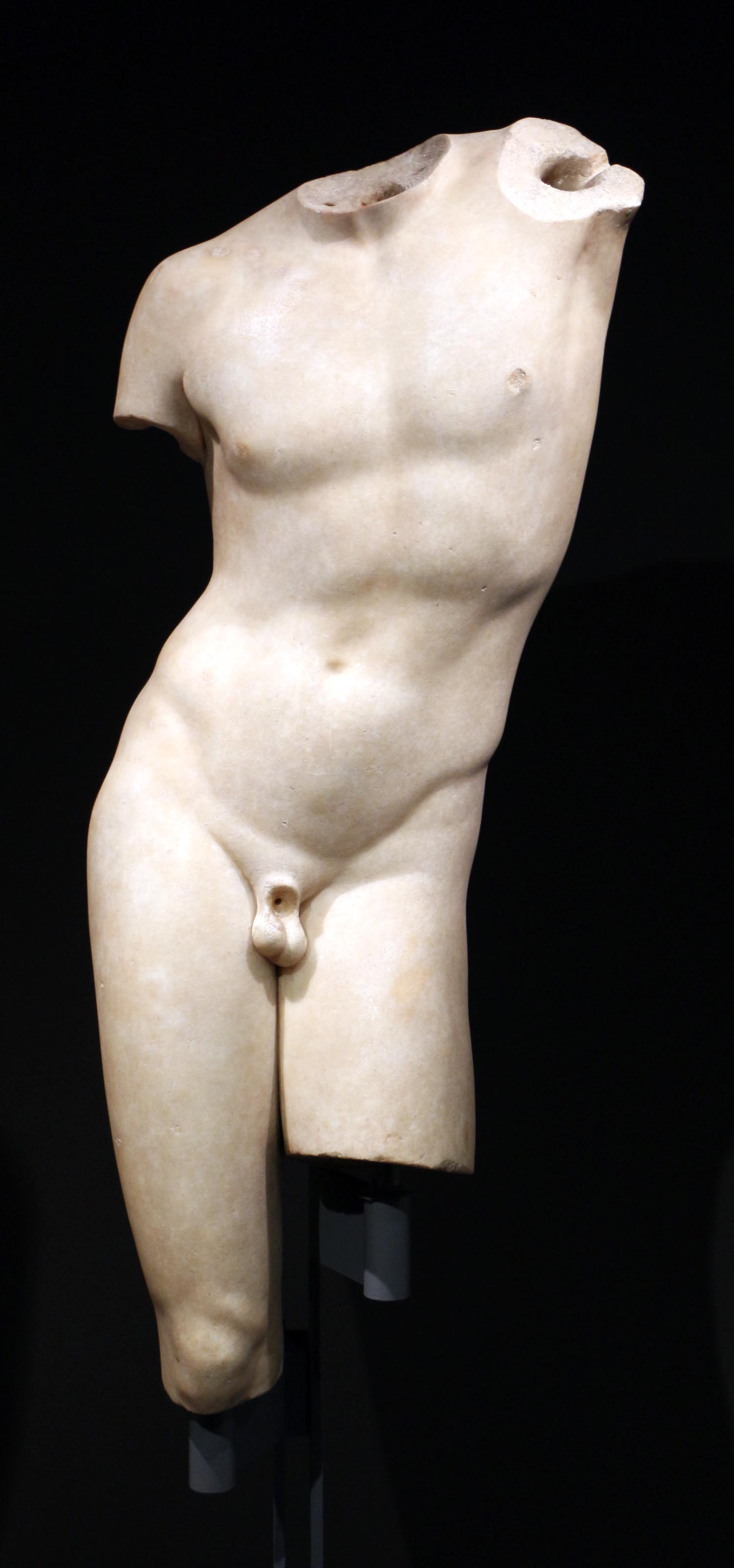
Torso of Pothos; 1st century.

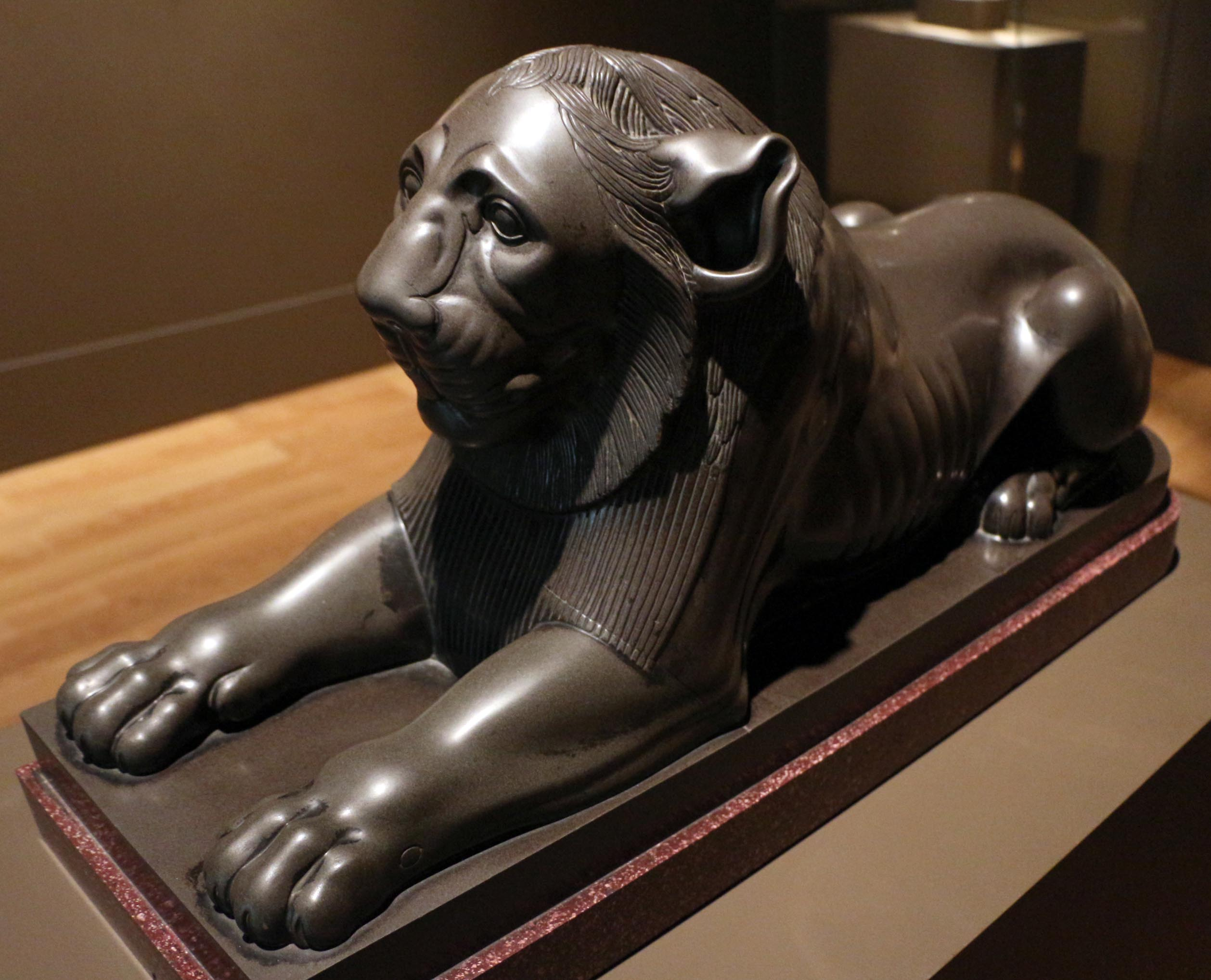
Ptolemaic lion; 325-30 BCE.

=== Goldwork ===
Portuguese metalwork is another highlight of the museum. Among its collection are pieces from the 12th to the 18th centuries. One of the most notable examples is the famous monstrance of Belém. It might have been made by the playwright, actor, and poet, Gil Vicente. According to an inscription on the monstrance, it was created out the gold brought back to Portugal from Kilwa (East Africa) in 1504–05 by the admiral Vasco da Gama.

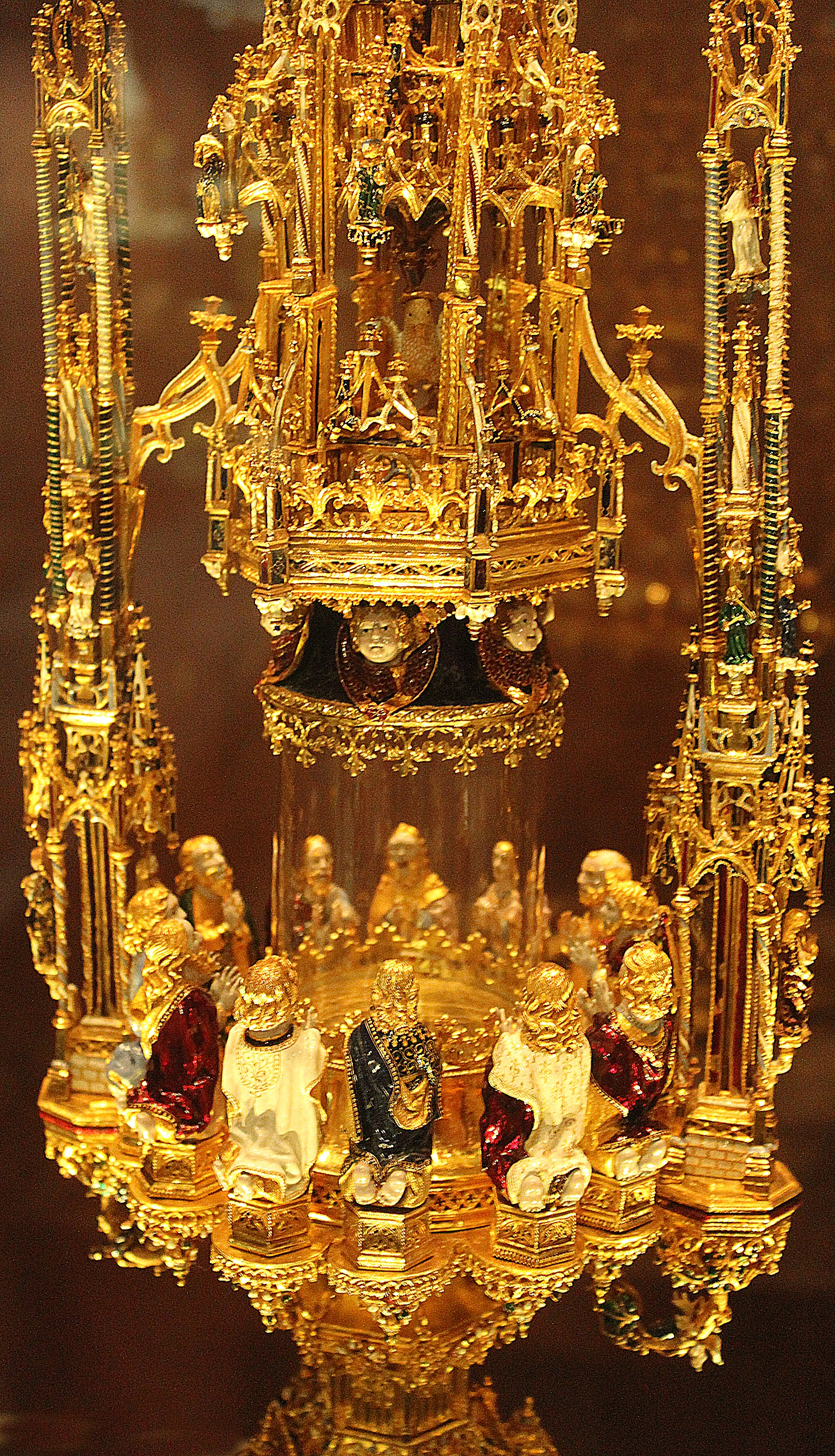
Custódia de Belém; 1506.

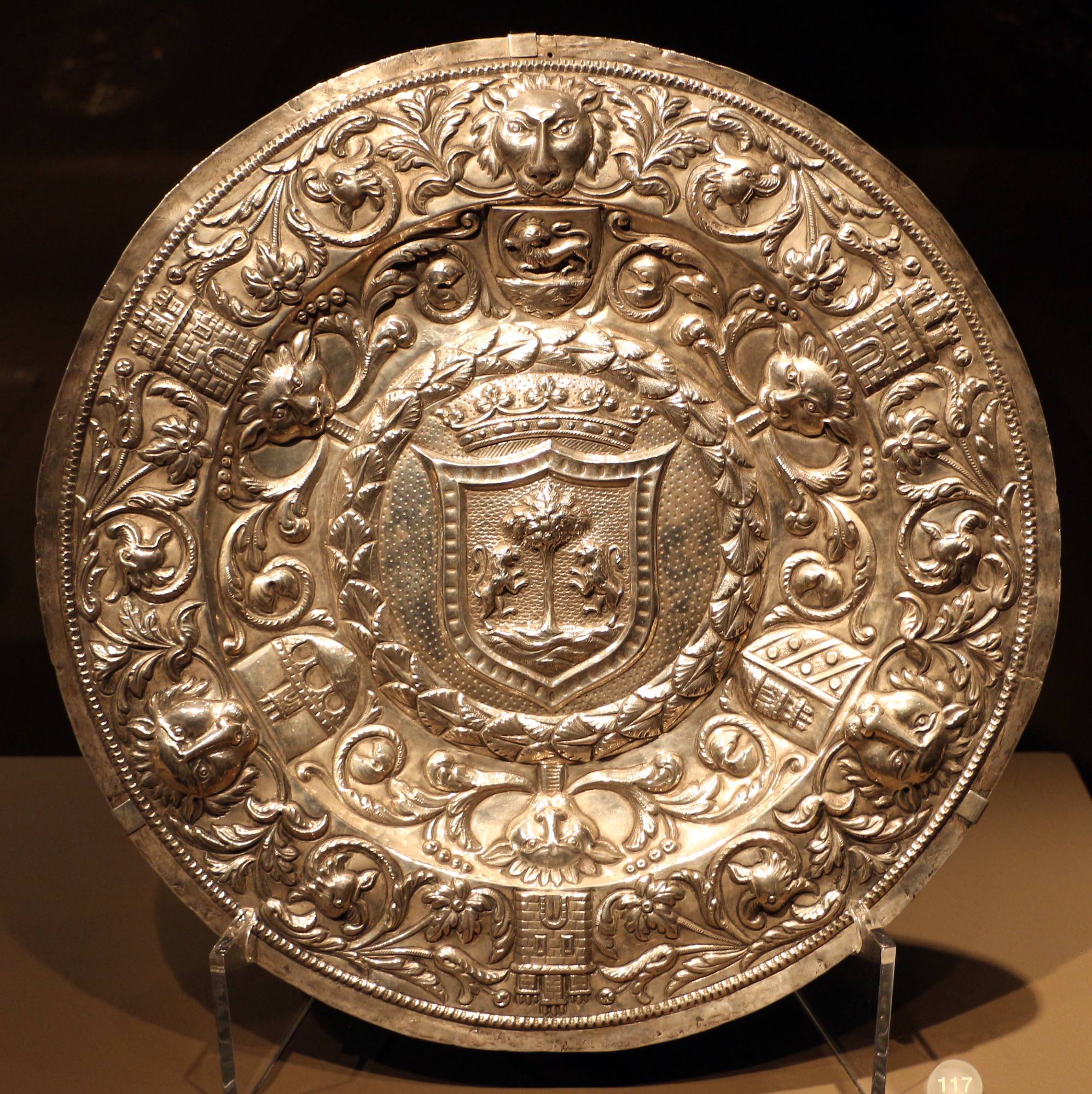
Portuguese plate; 19th century.

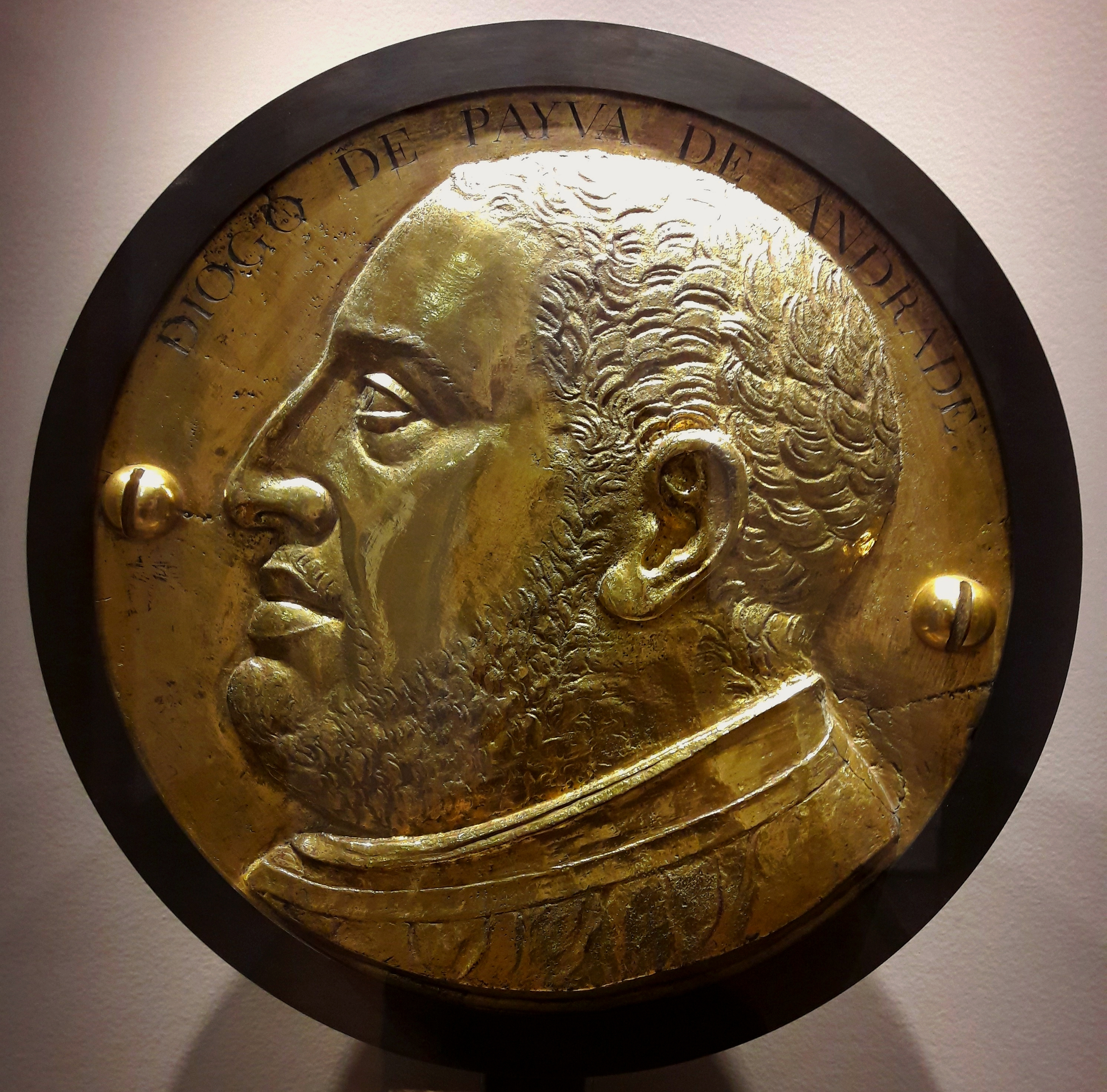
Cameo of Diogo de Paiva de Andrade; c. 1575.

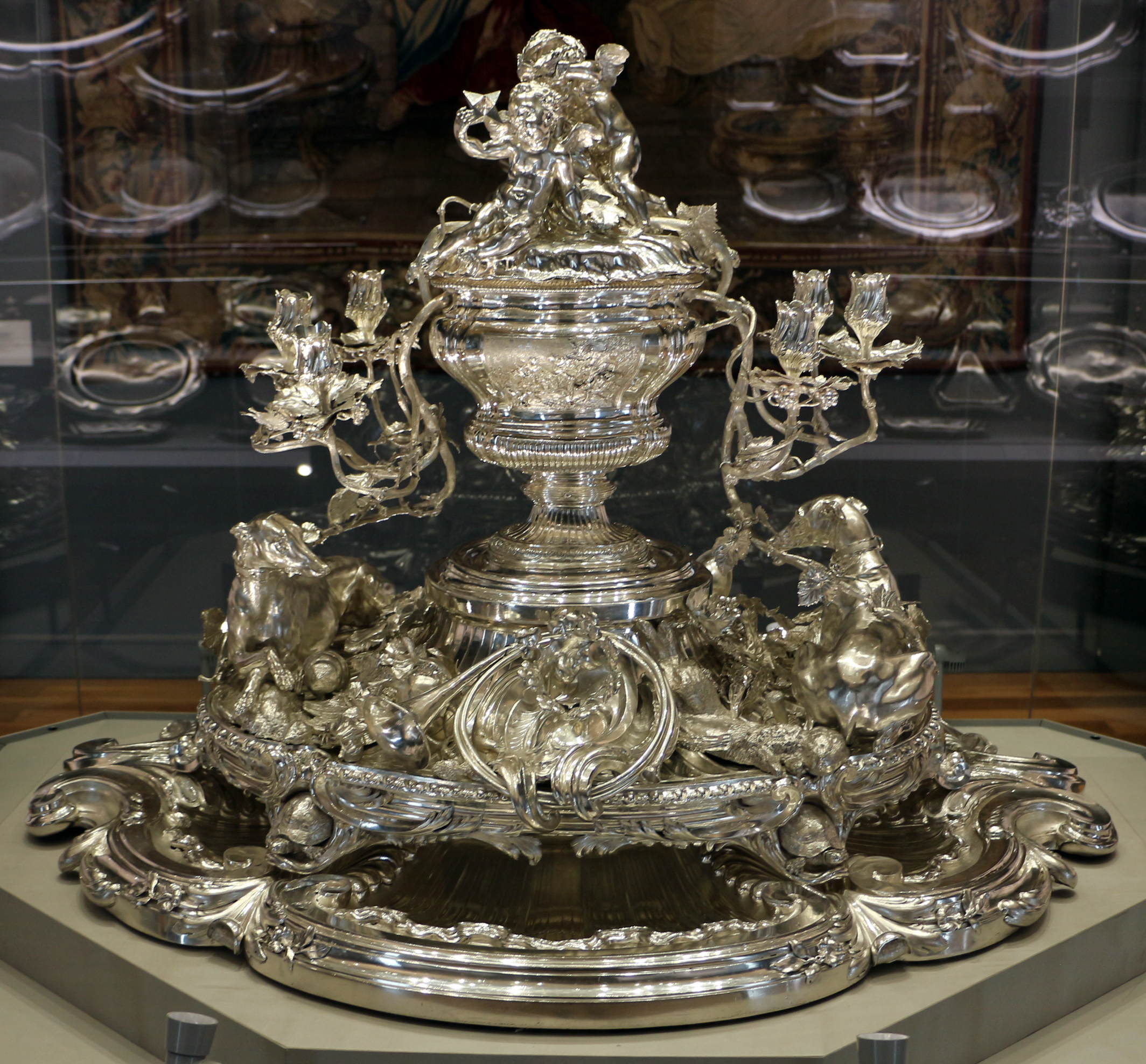
Germain Service; c. 1750-60's.

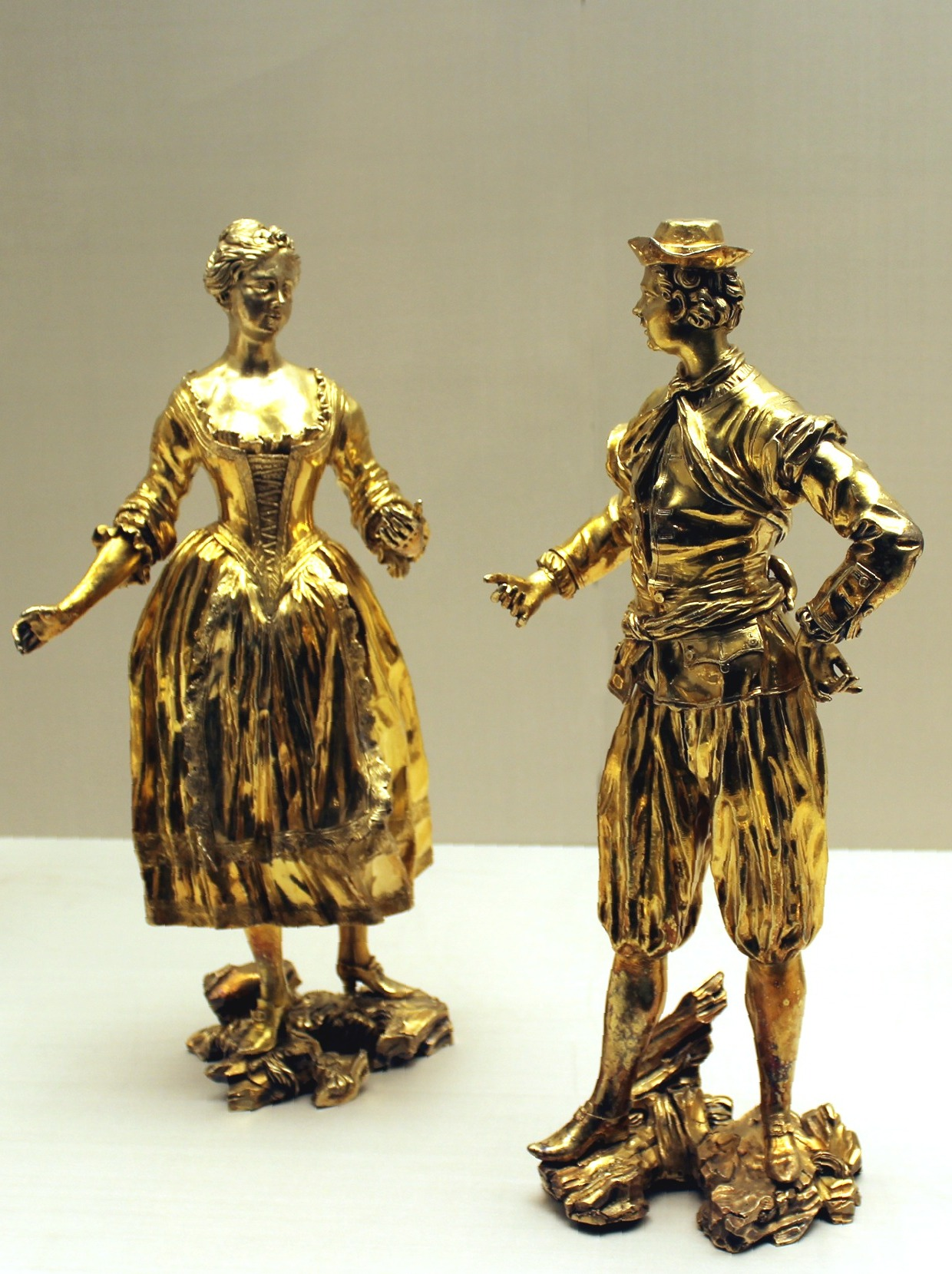
Dancing Courtiers by Ambroise-Nicolas Cousinet; 1757–8.

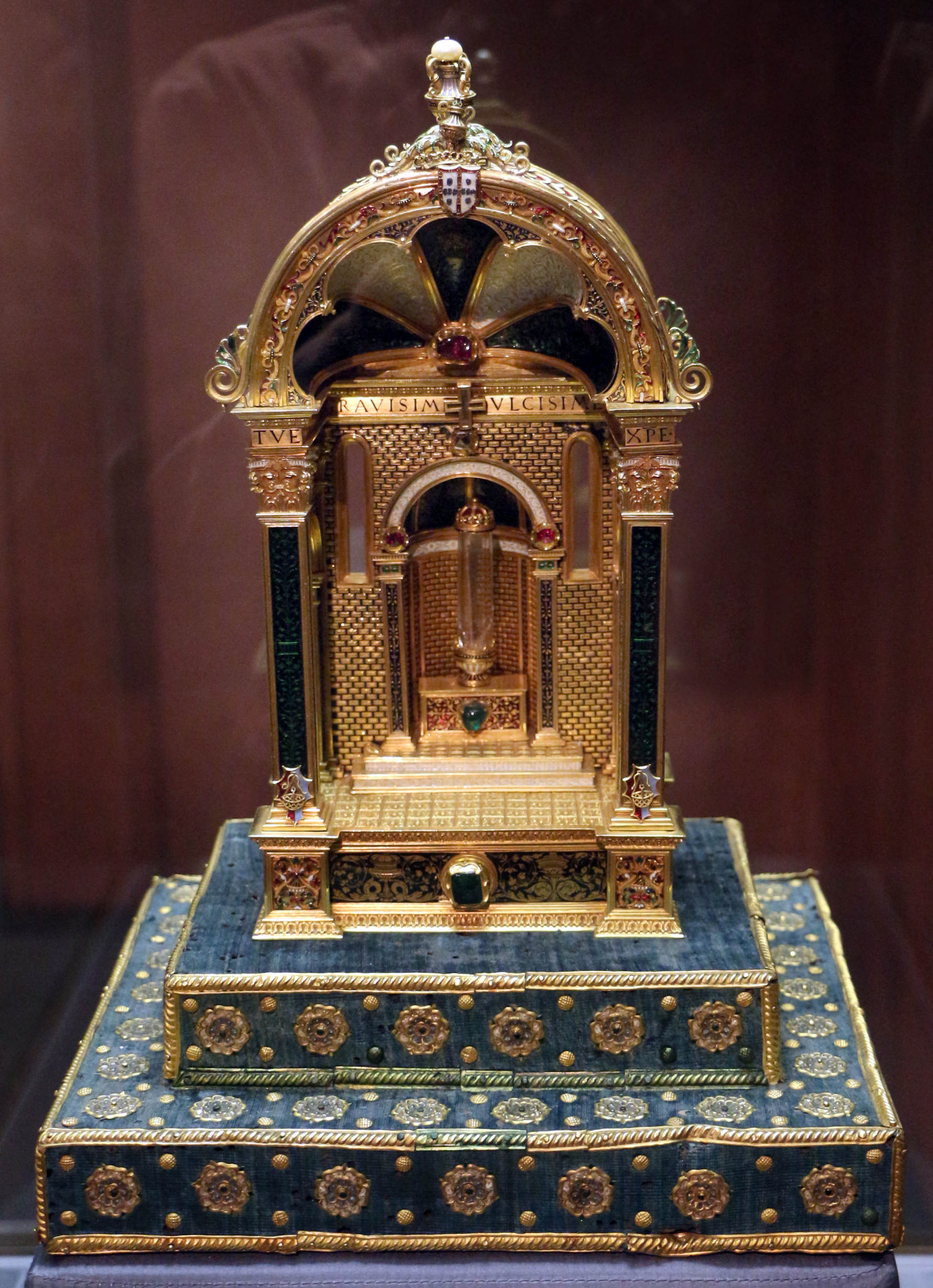
Crown of Thorns Reliquary; c. 1515–25.

=== Textiles ===
The MNAA's collection of textiles includes pieces from France, Ancient Egypt, Portugal, India, and Italy, among other places.

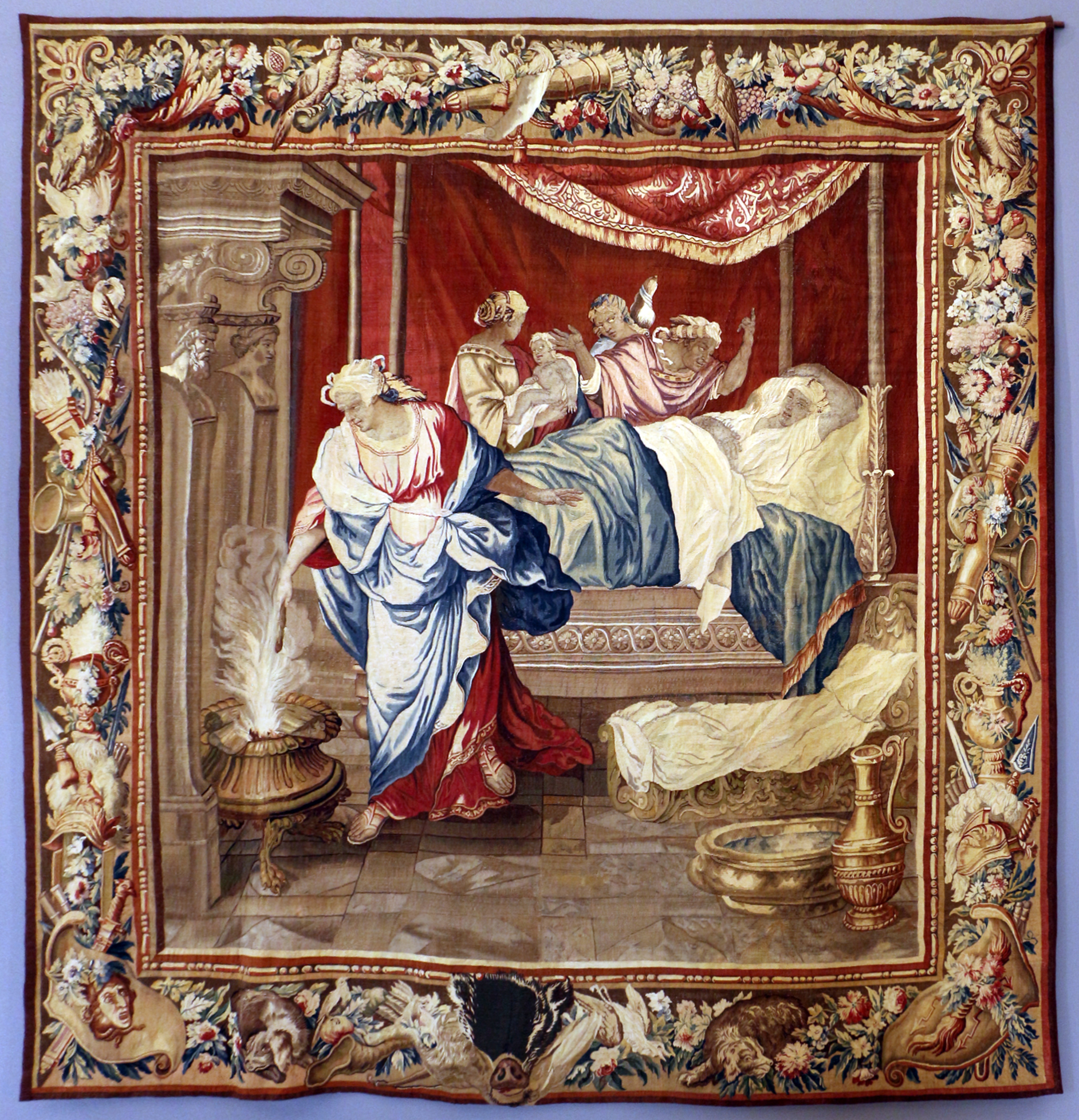
Birth of Meleager by Jan Leyniers; 1680.

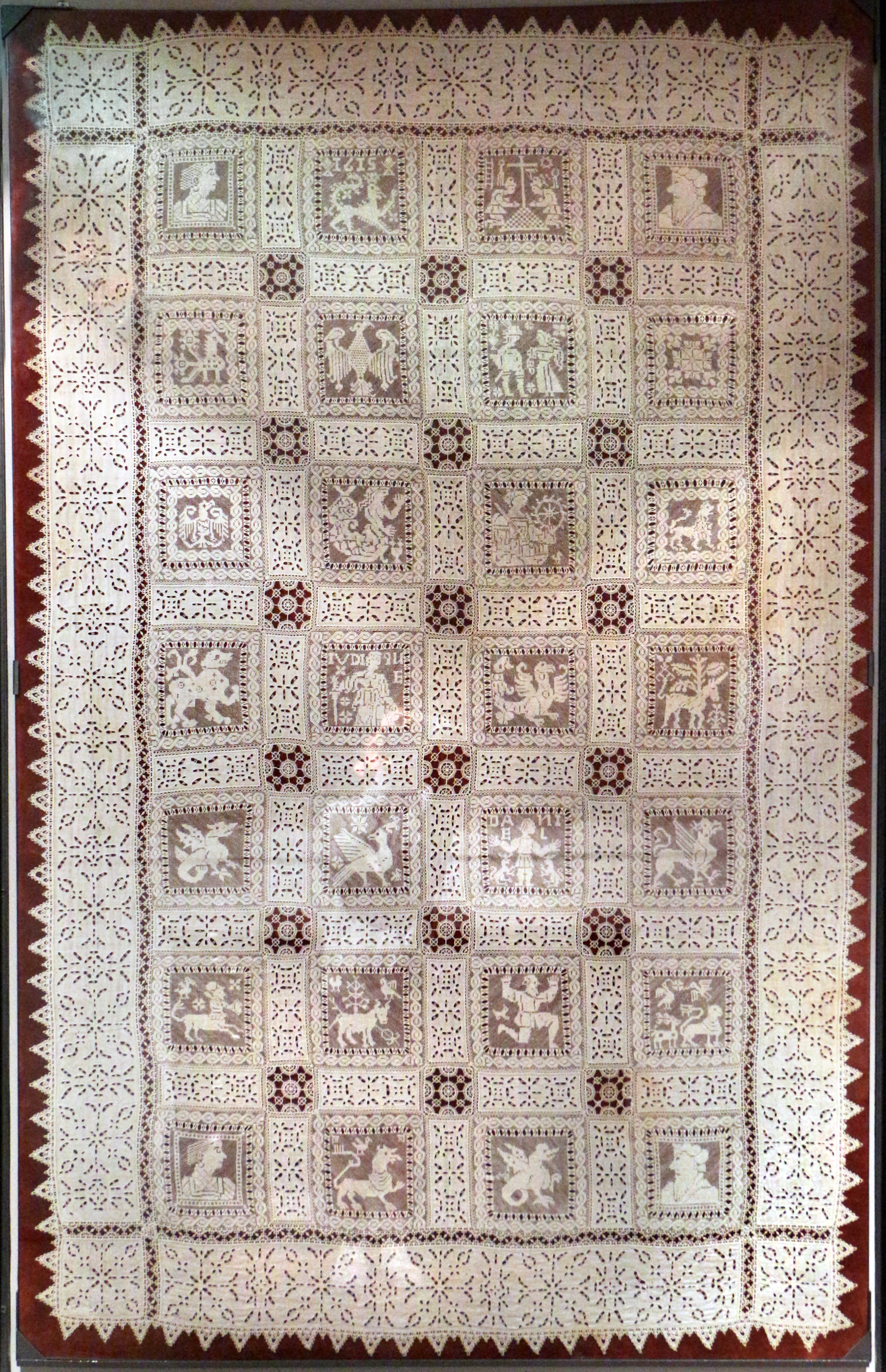
Portuguese lace; 1615.

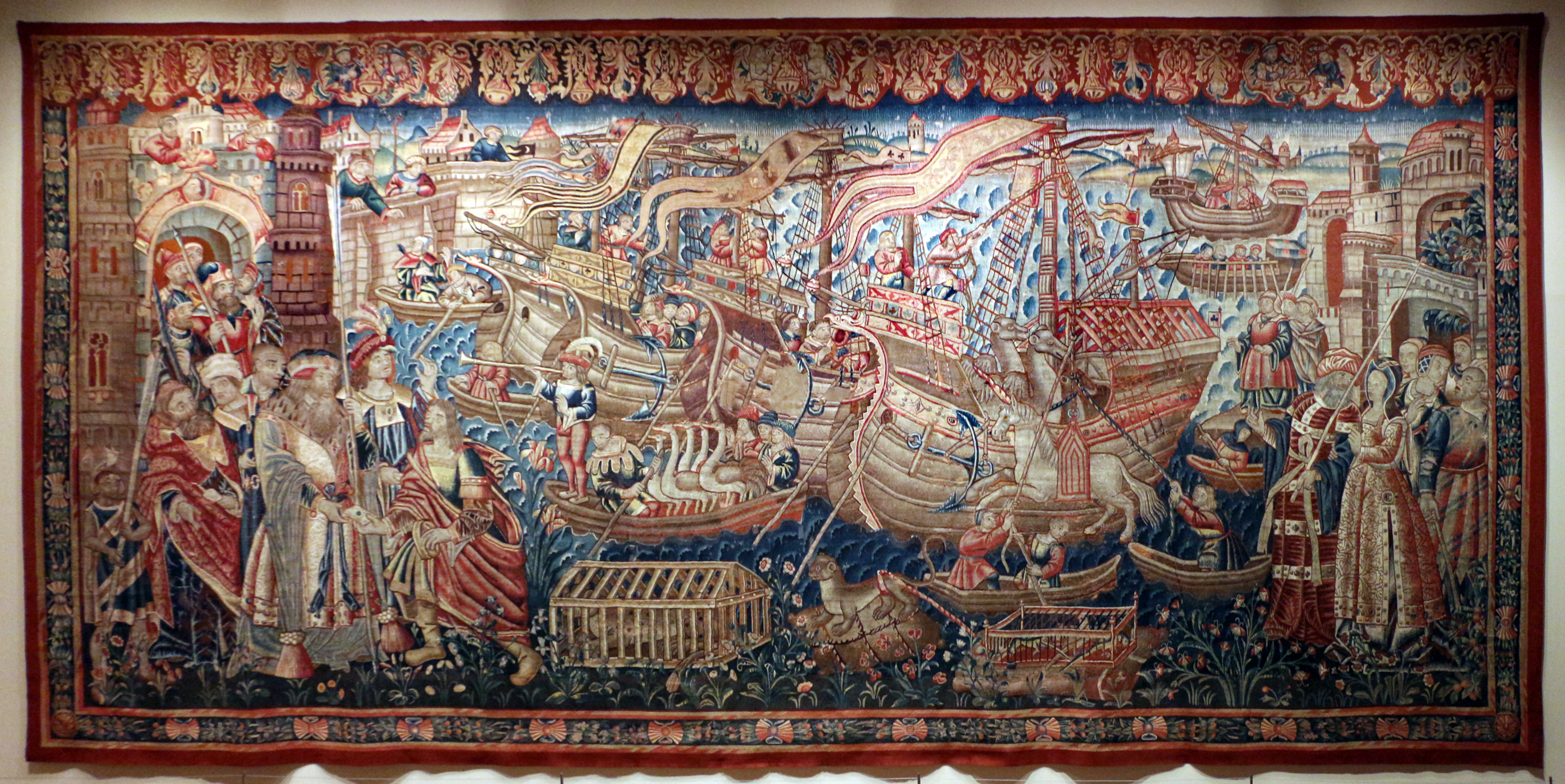
Arrival of the Portuguese to India from Tournai; 1504–30.

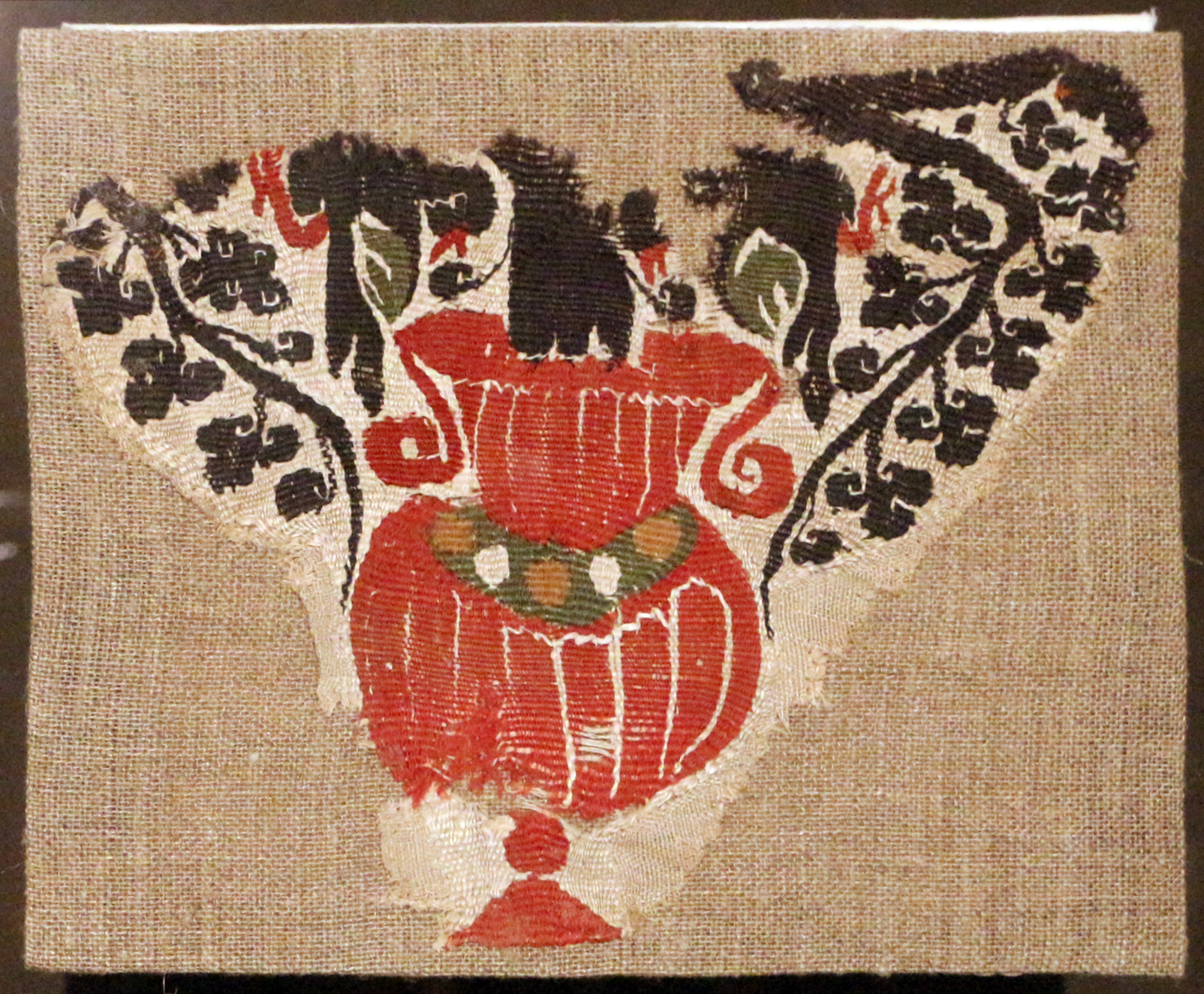
Coptic Egyptian textile; 5th century.

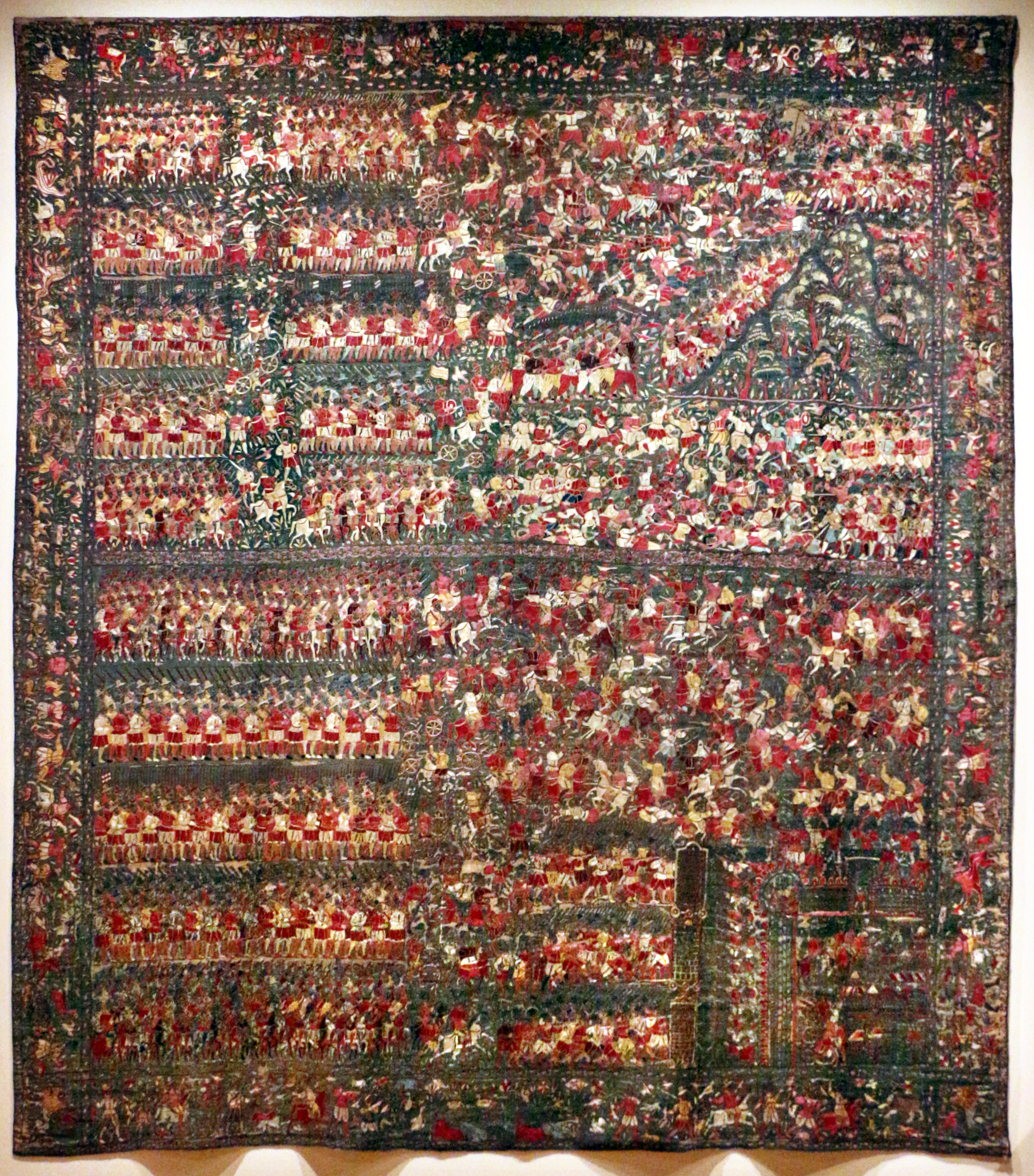
Indian Tapestry; 1600–10.

=== Imperial collection ===
The MNAA's Coleção de Arte da Expansão is the museum's vast collection of art from the former Portuguese Empire, collected from the Americas, Asia, and Africa.

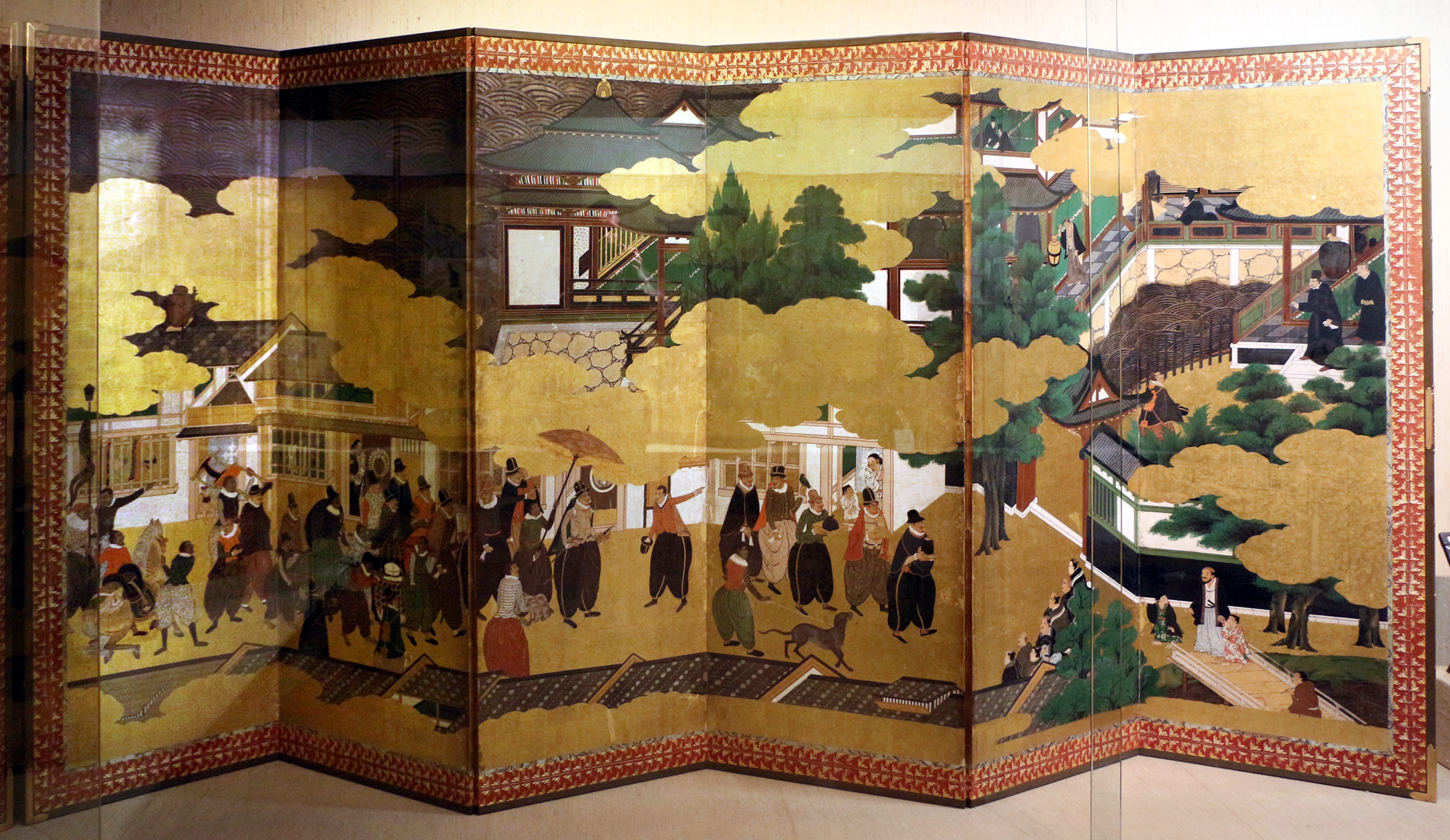
Nanban screen; c. 1593.

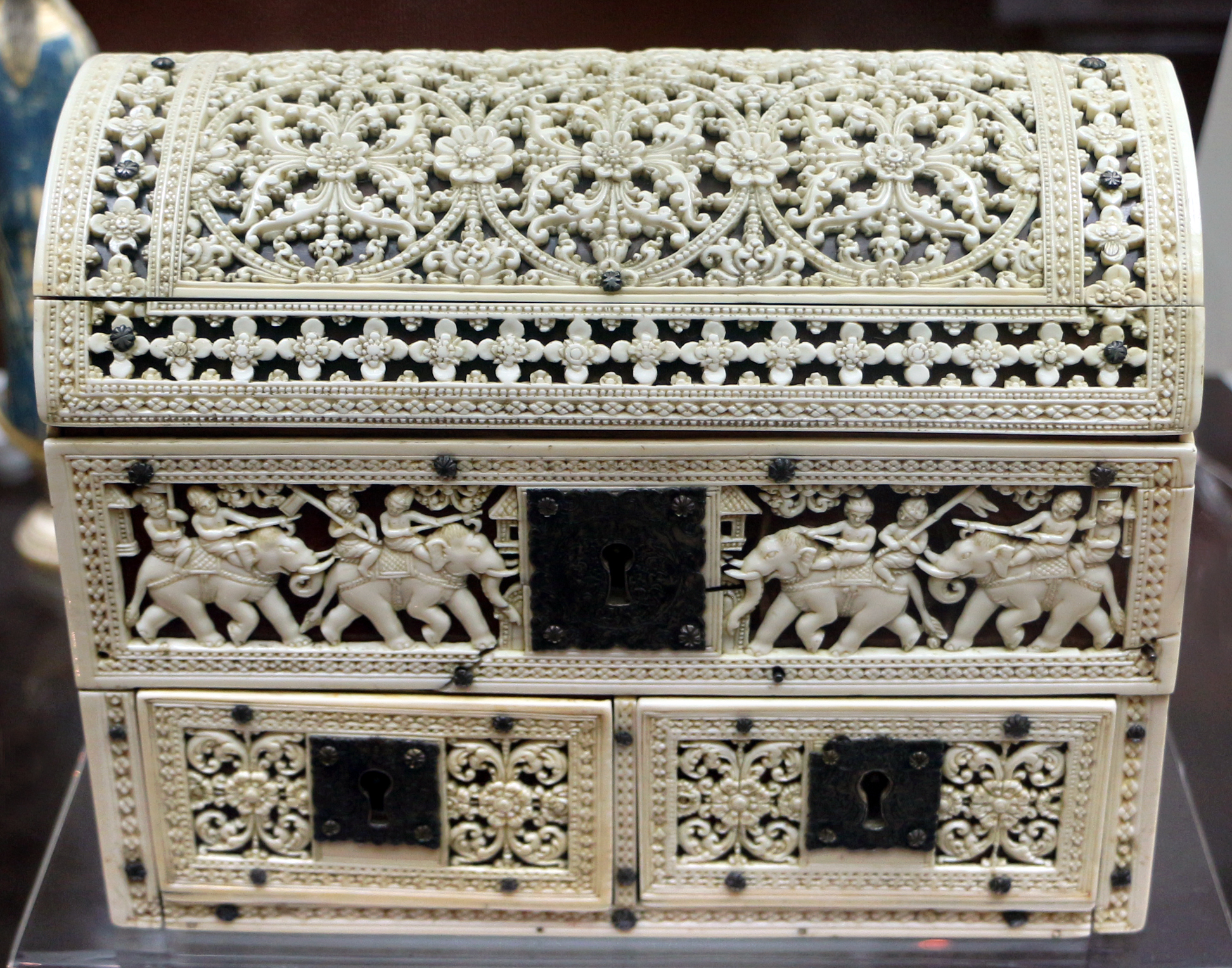
Indo-Portuguese coffer; 17th century.

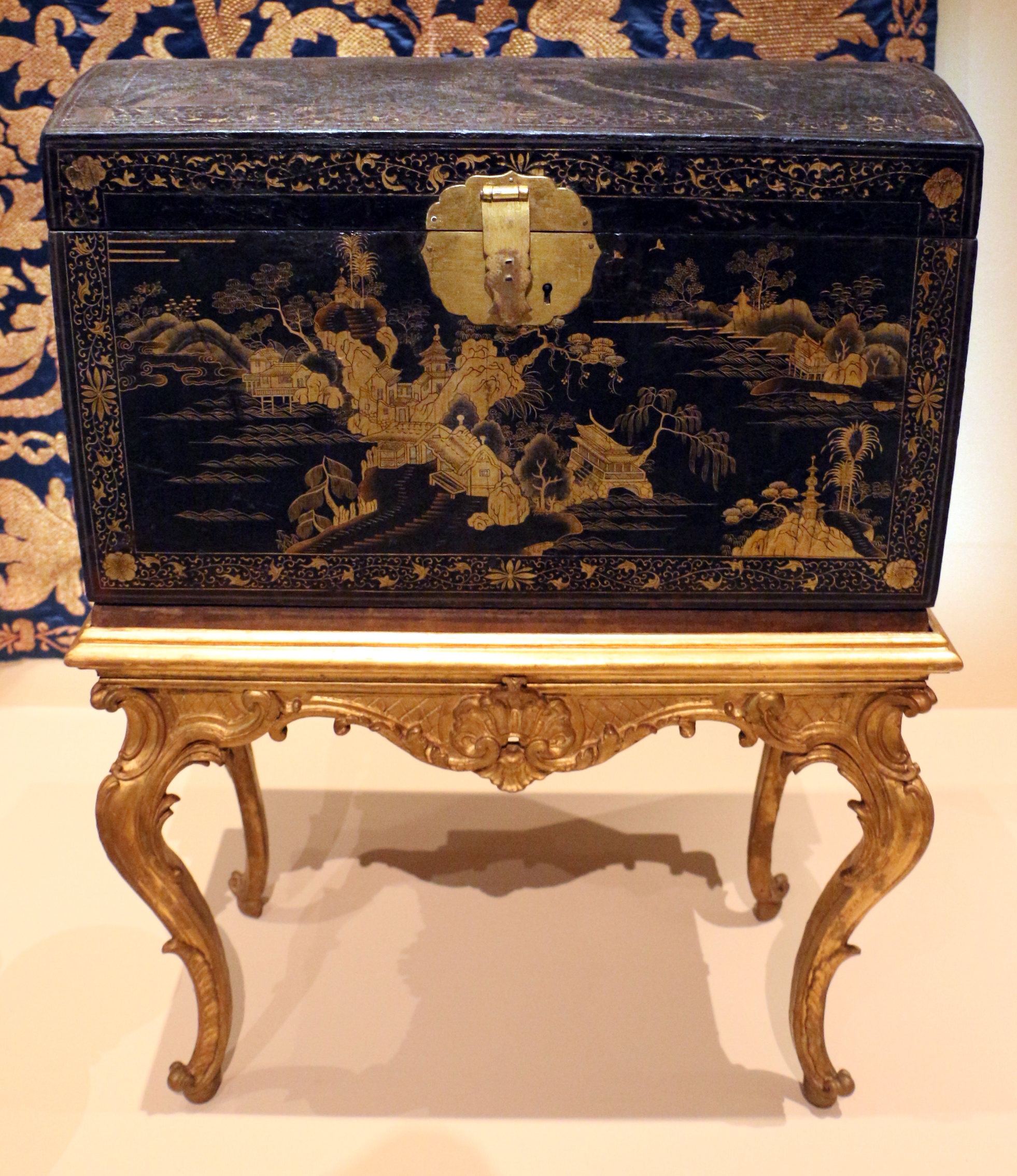
Chinese cabinet; 18th century.

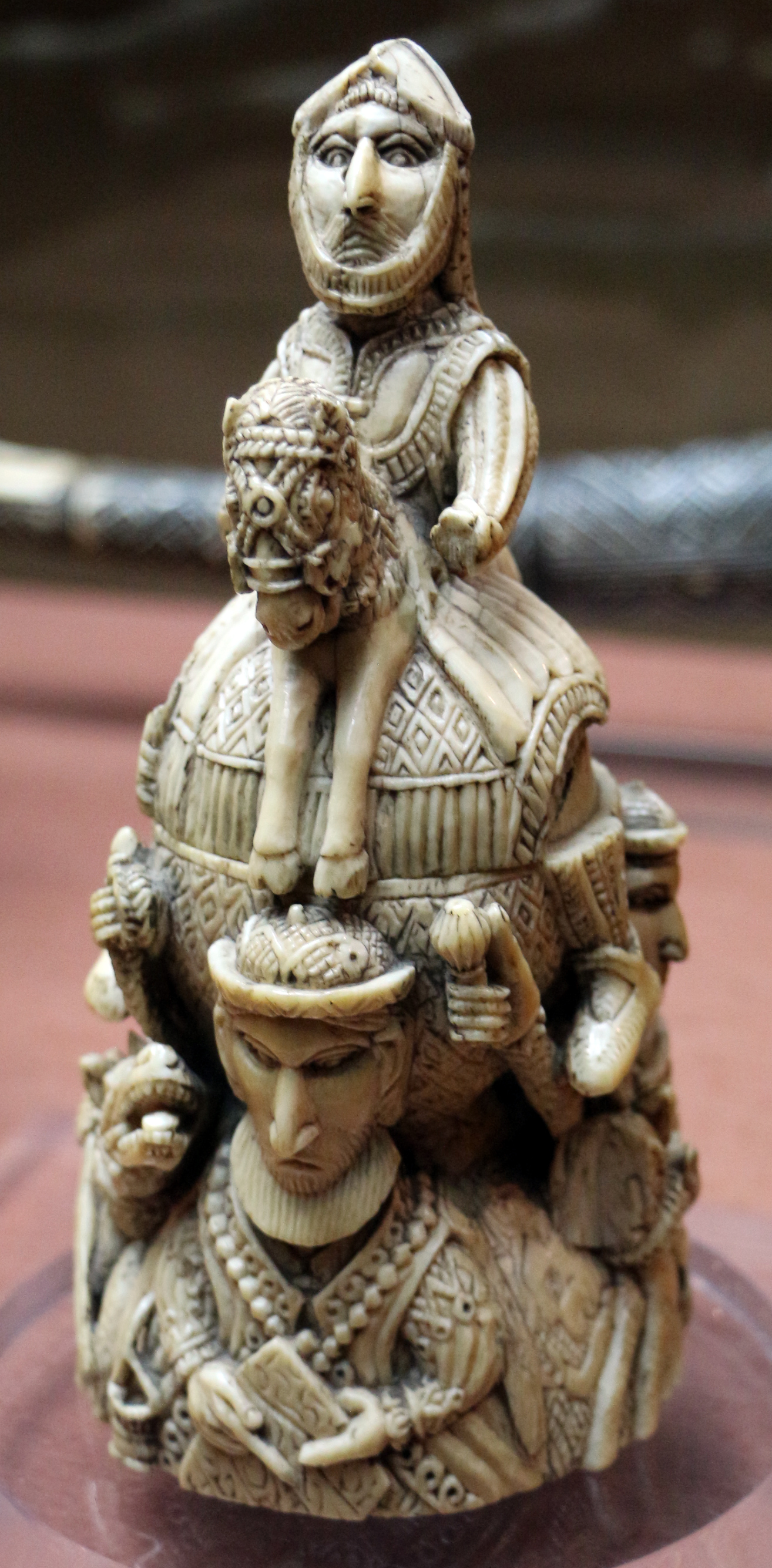
Afro-Portuguese ivory figurine; 16th century.

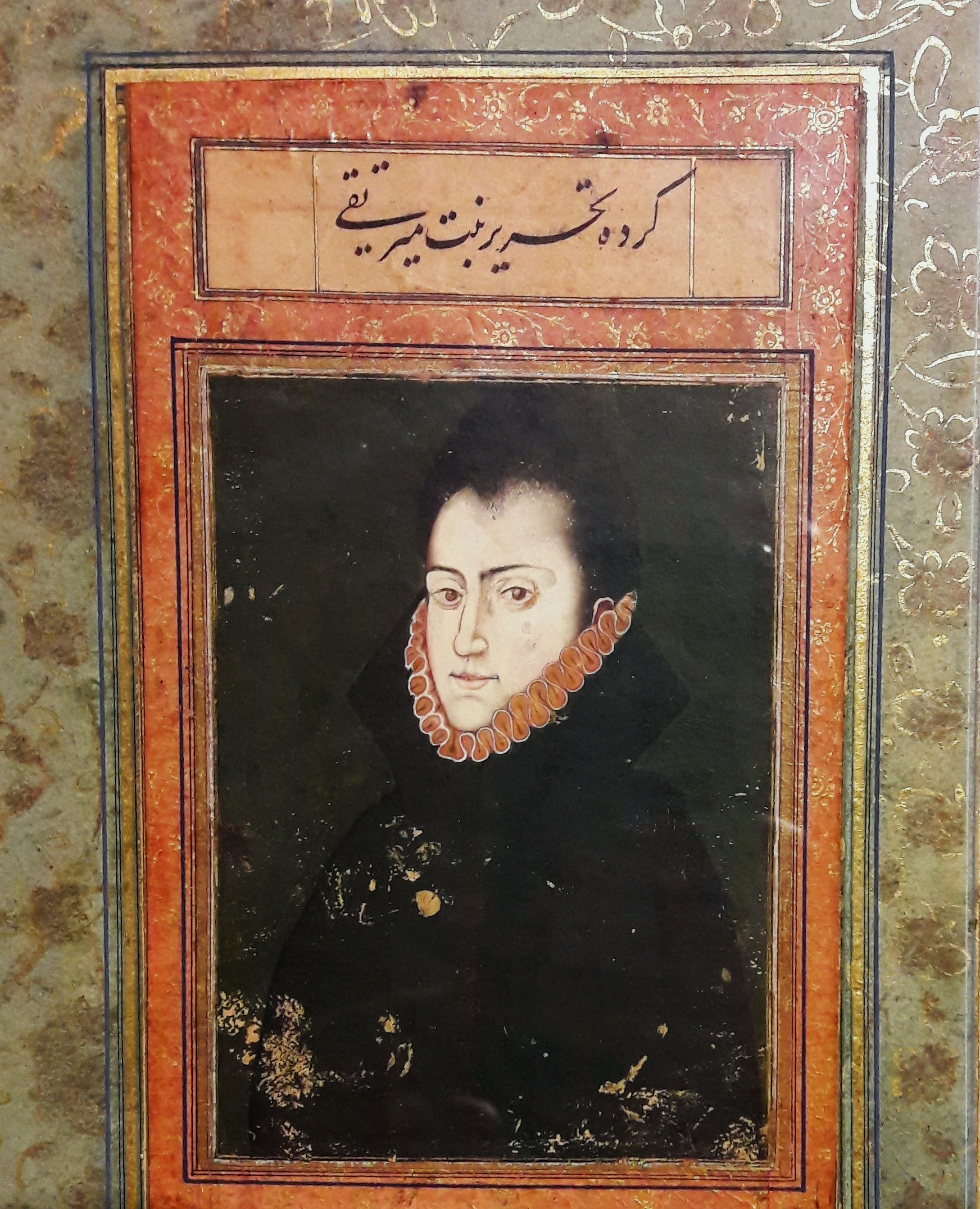
Persian portrait of a Portuguese nobleman; 16th century.

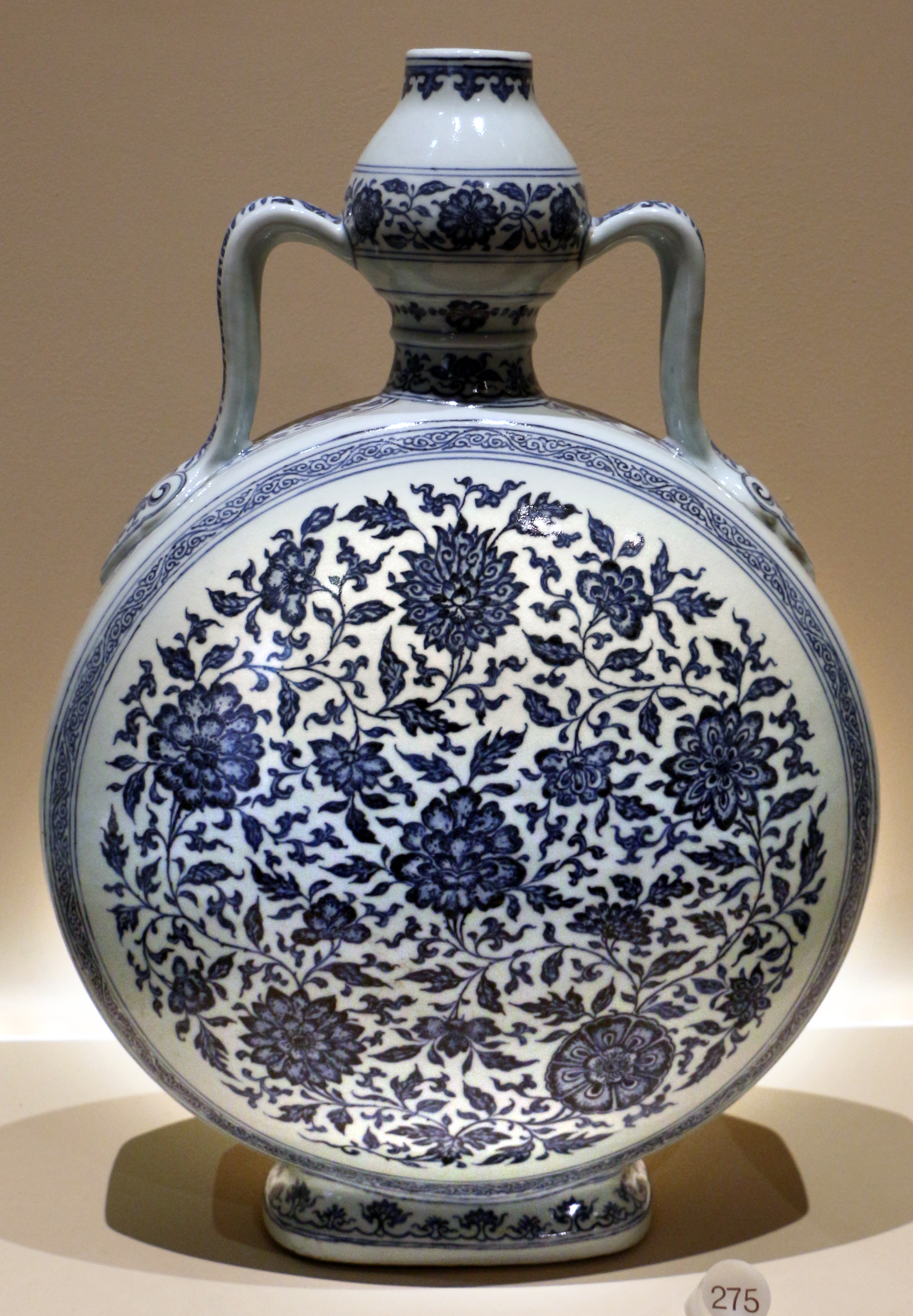
Qing dynasty vase; 1723–35.

=== Furniture ===
The MNAA's collection of pieces of furniture span several centuries and originate primarily in France, Italy, Portugal, and Portuguese India. The most notable collections are those of the Portuguese royal residences and the collection of pieces from the former Portuguese Empire.

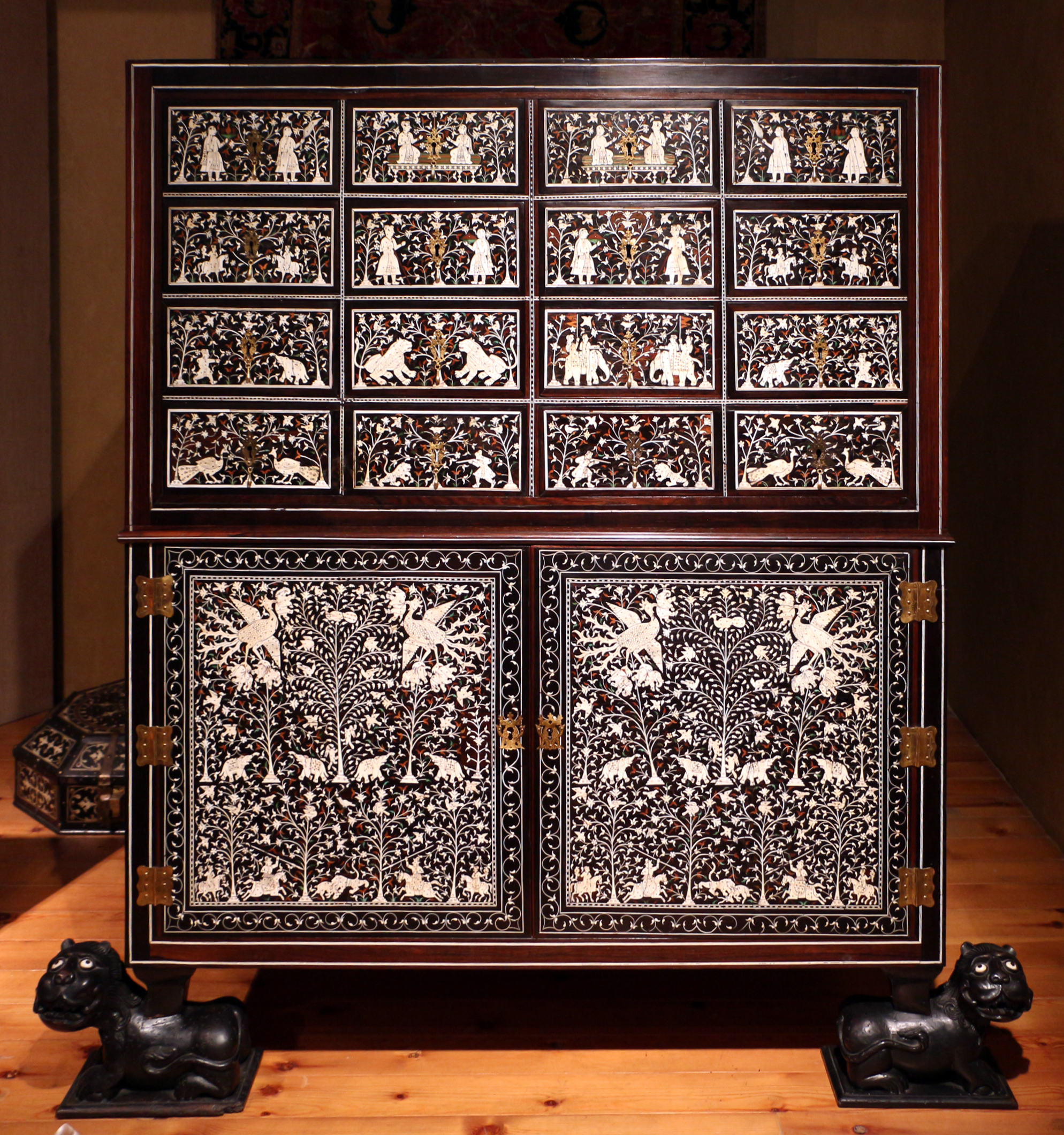
Indo-Portuguese cabinet; 16-17th century.

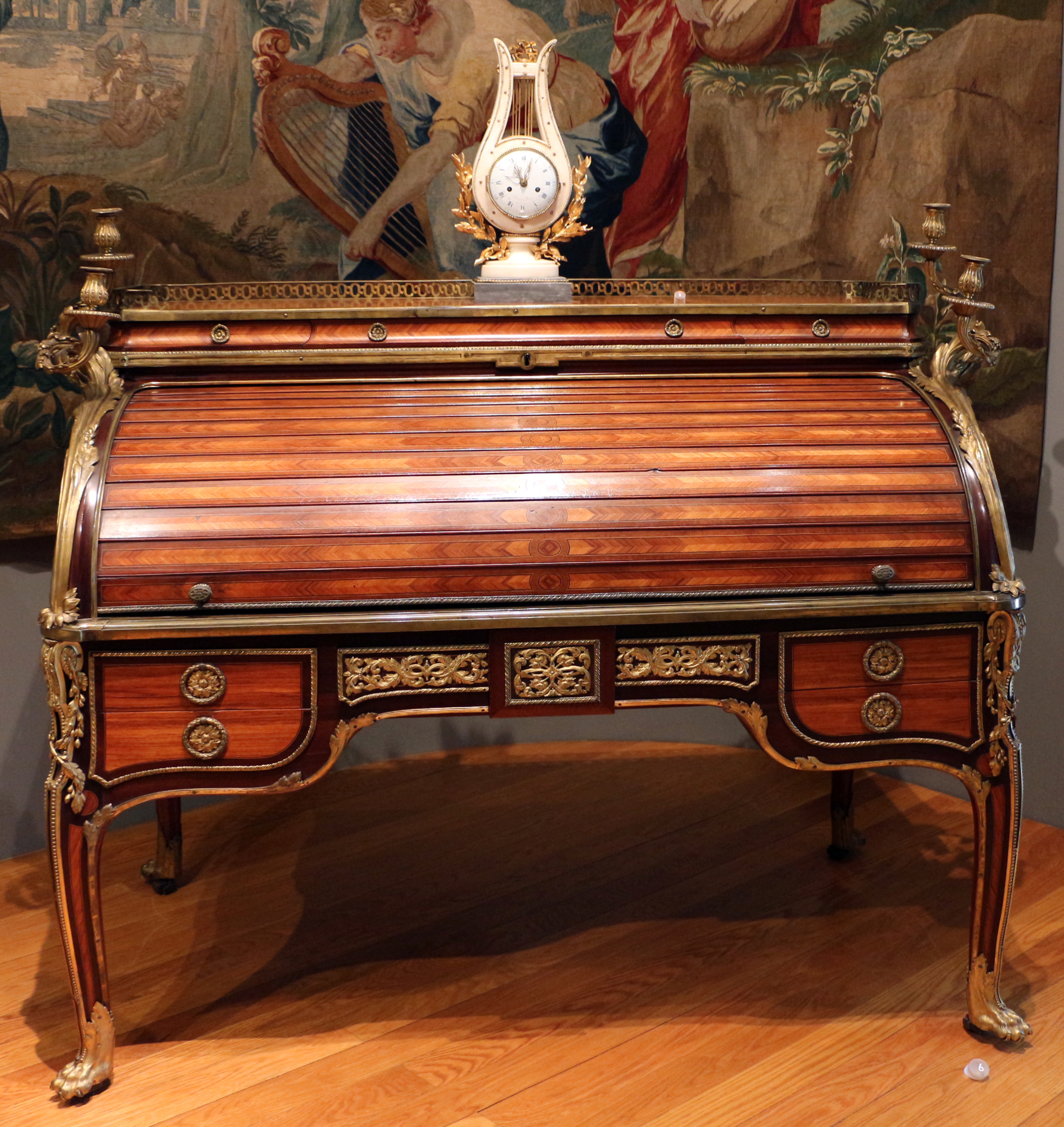
Secretary by Jean Henri Riesener; c. 1776.

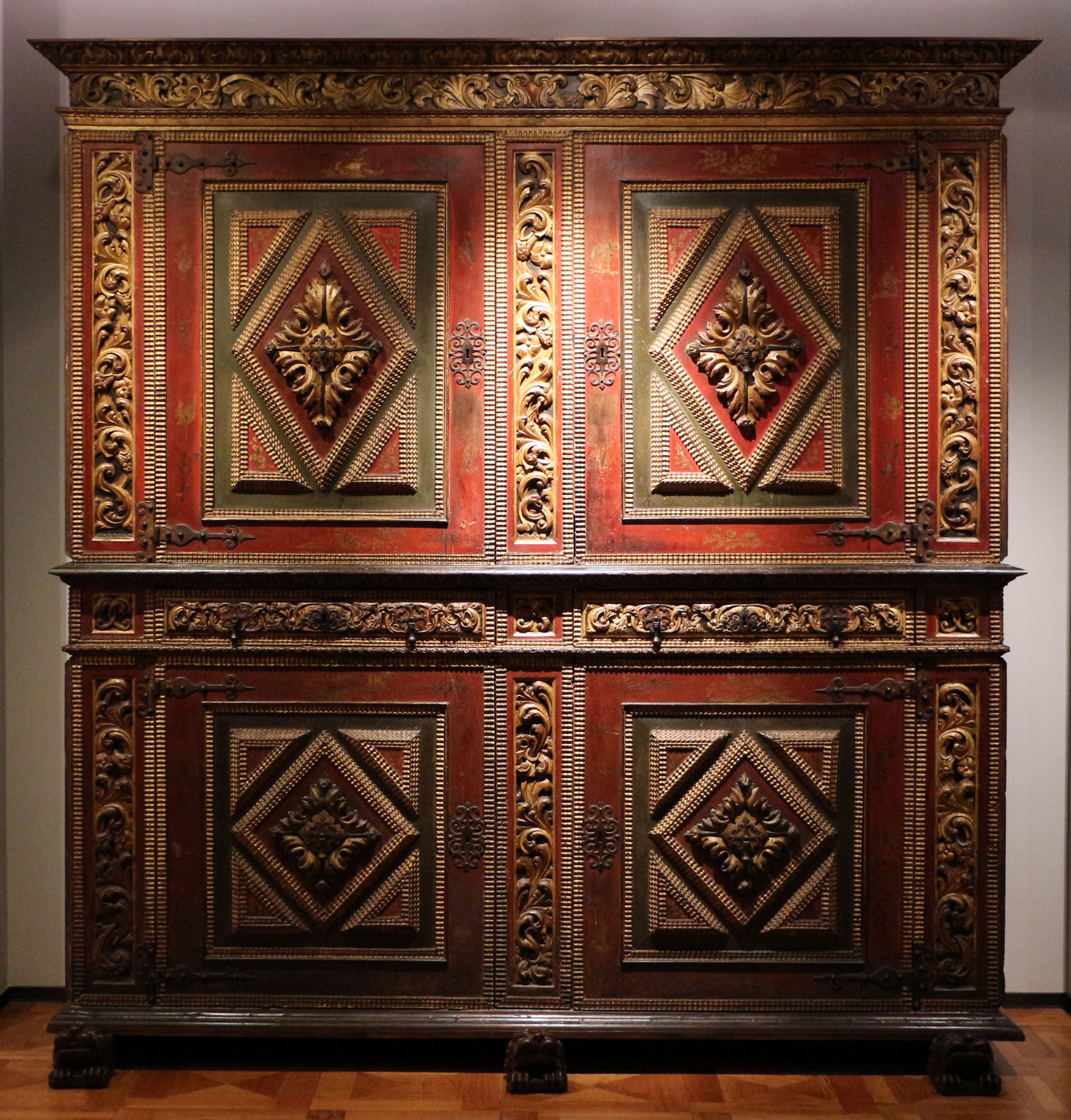
Portuguese credenza; c. 1650–1700

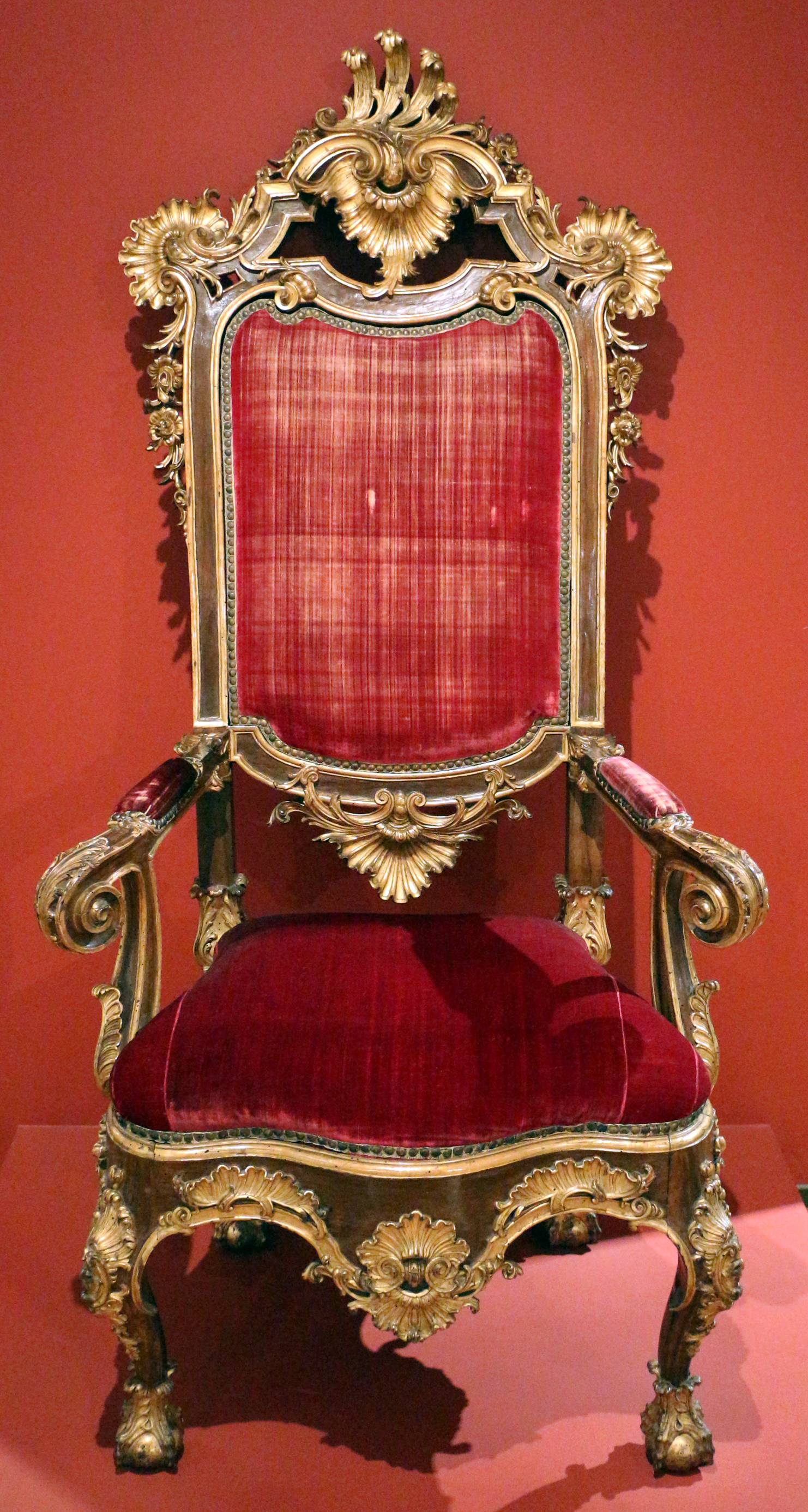
Portuguese chair; c. 1750.

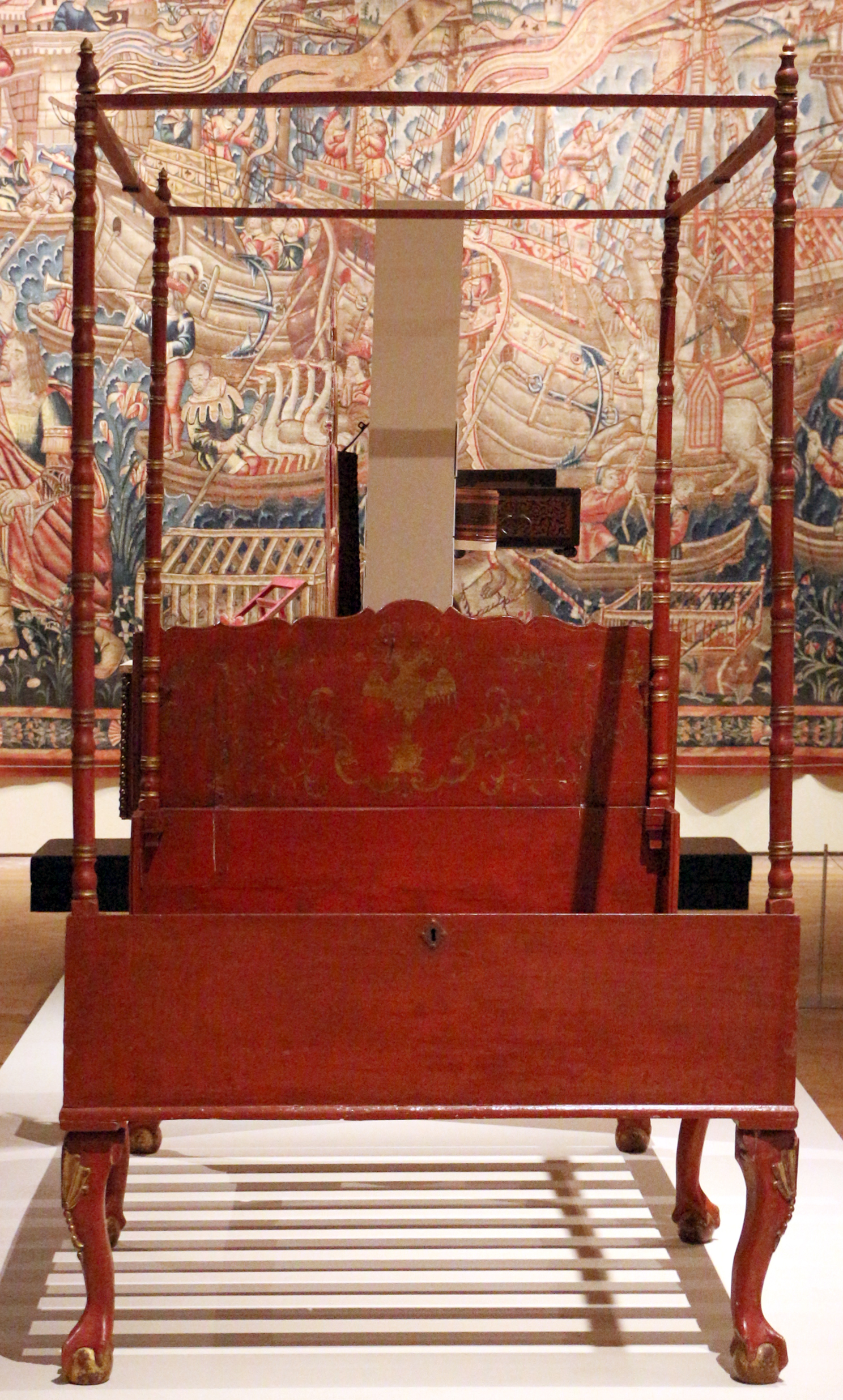
Portuguese bed; c. 1750.

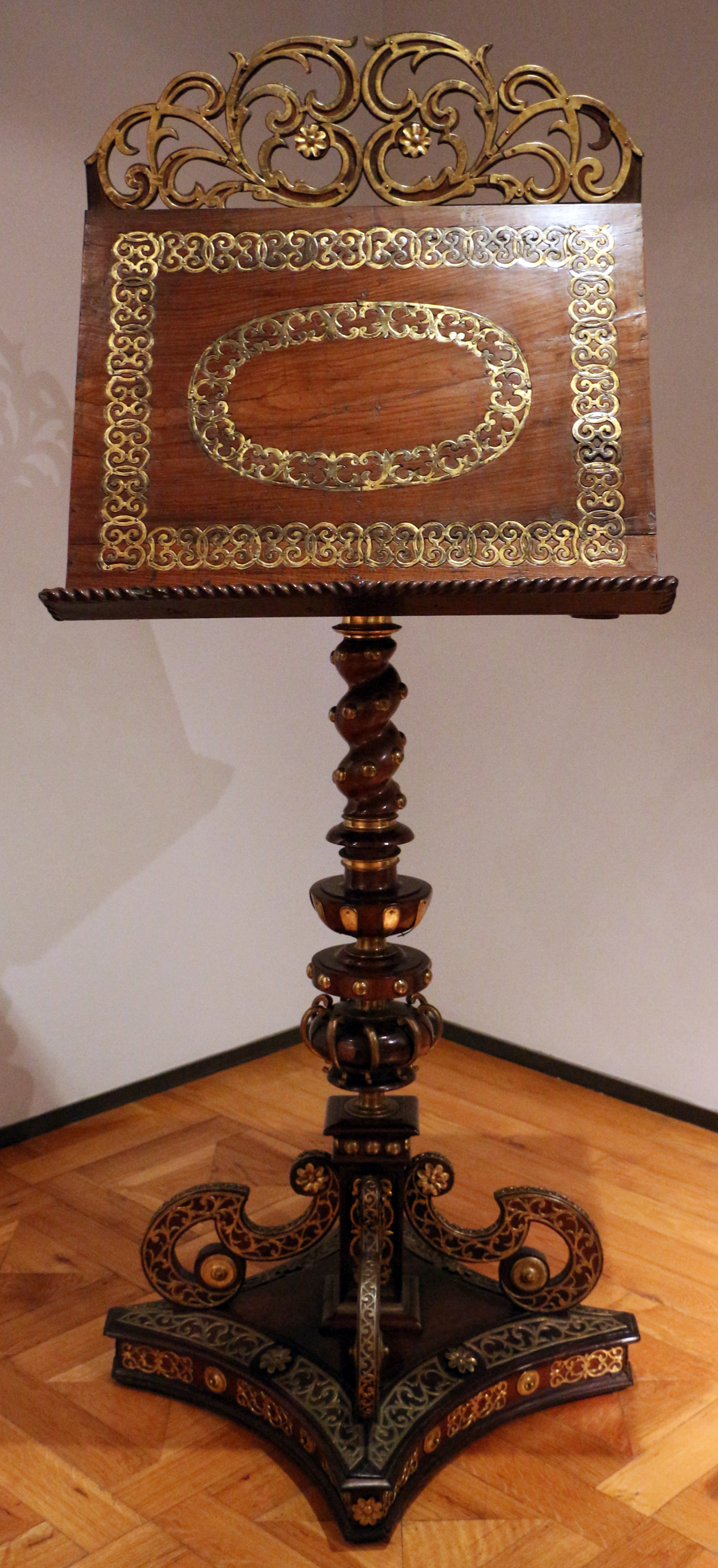
Music stand; c. 1650.

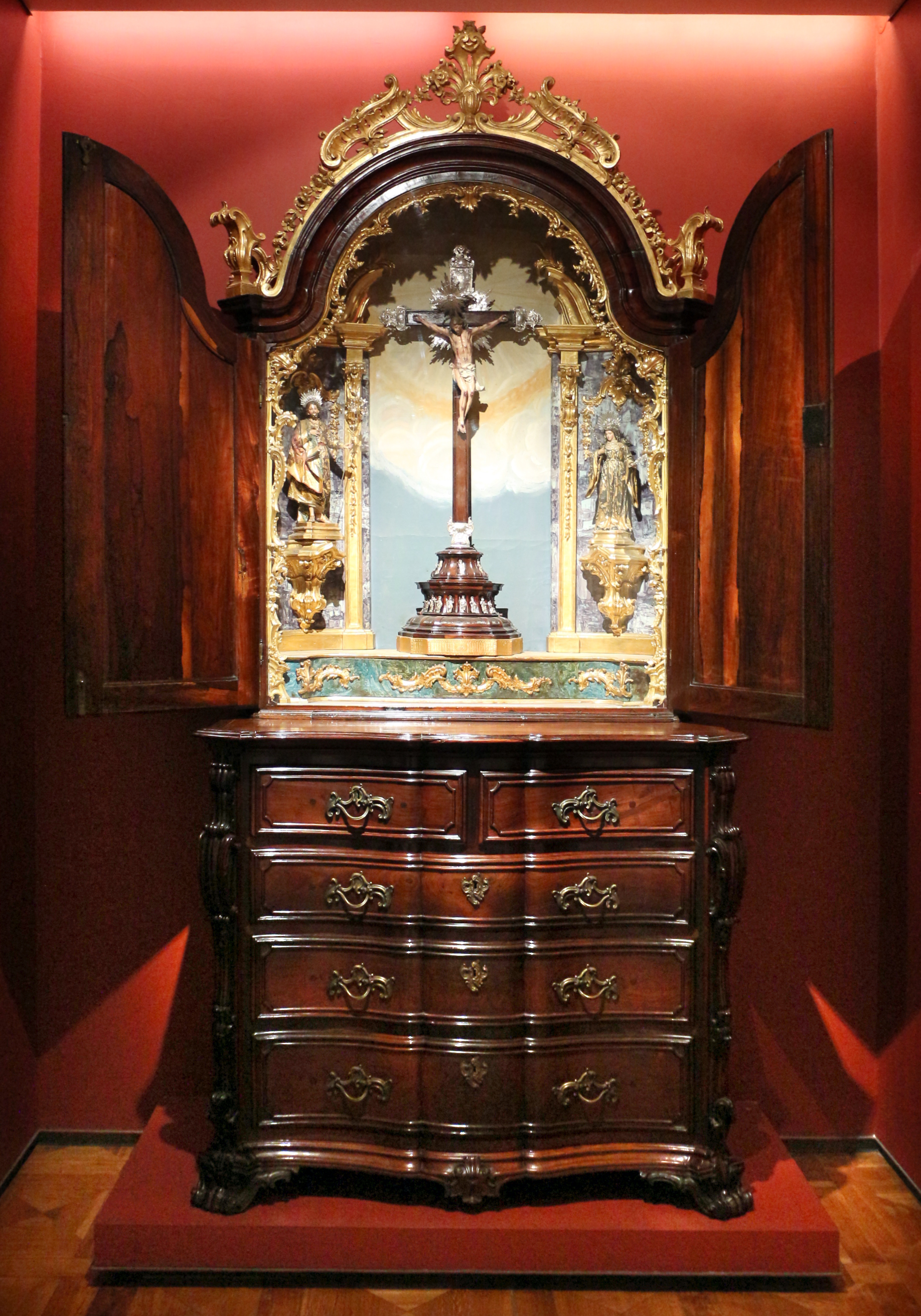
Portuguese oratory; 1730–60.

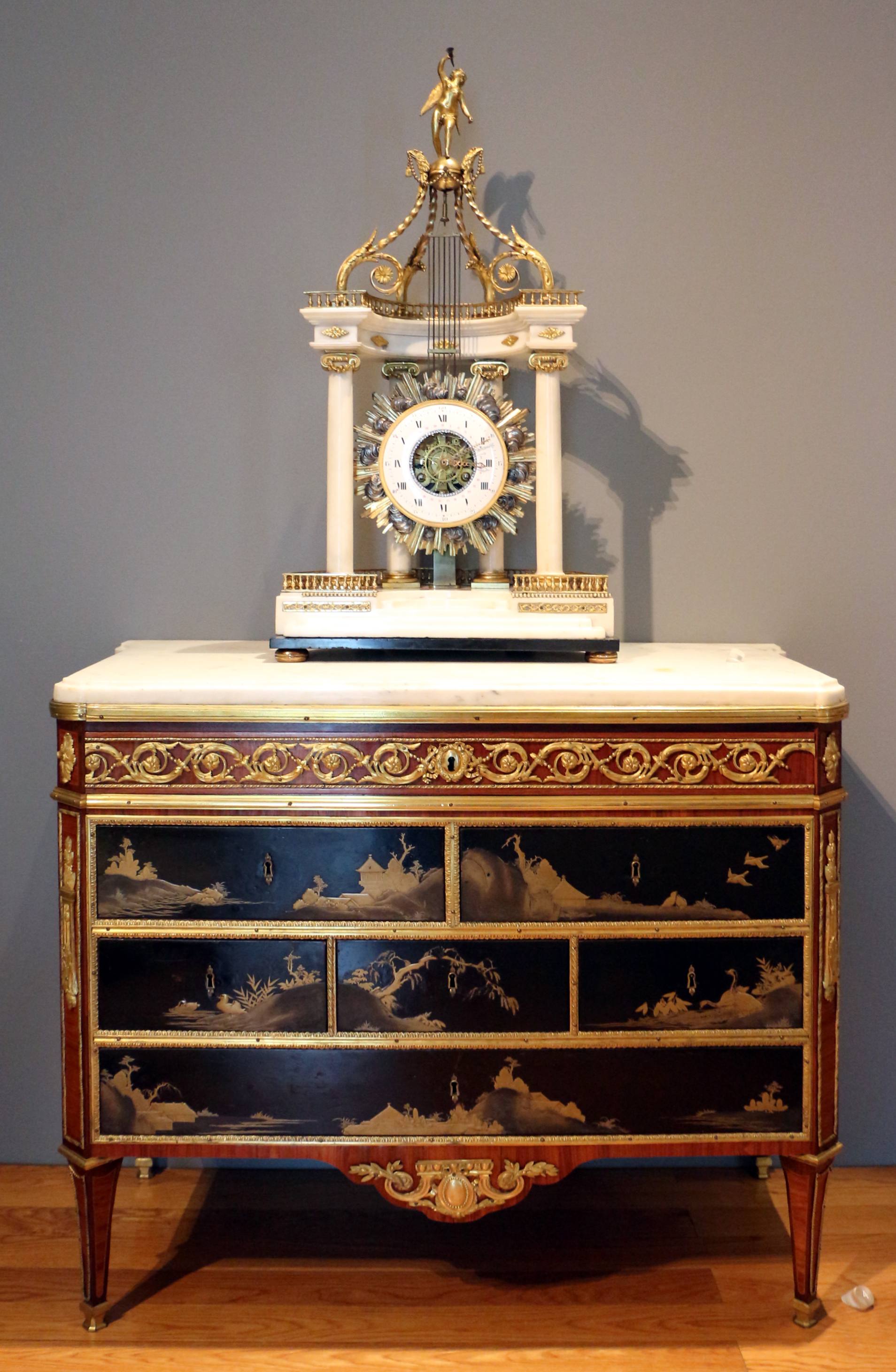
French clock and drawers by Claude-Charles Saunier; c. 1775.

=== Ceramics ===
The MNAA's collection of ceramics and porcelain spans several centuries with pieces originating in mainly Portugal, France, Italy, Spain, and China. Notable collections include Qing dynasty porcelains, Hispano-Moresque ware, and Caldas da Rainha ceramics.

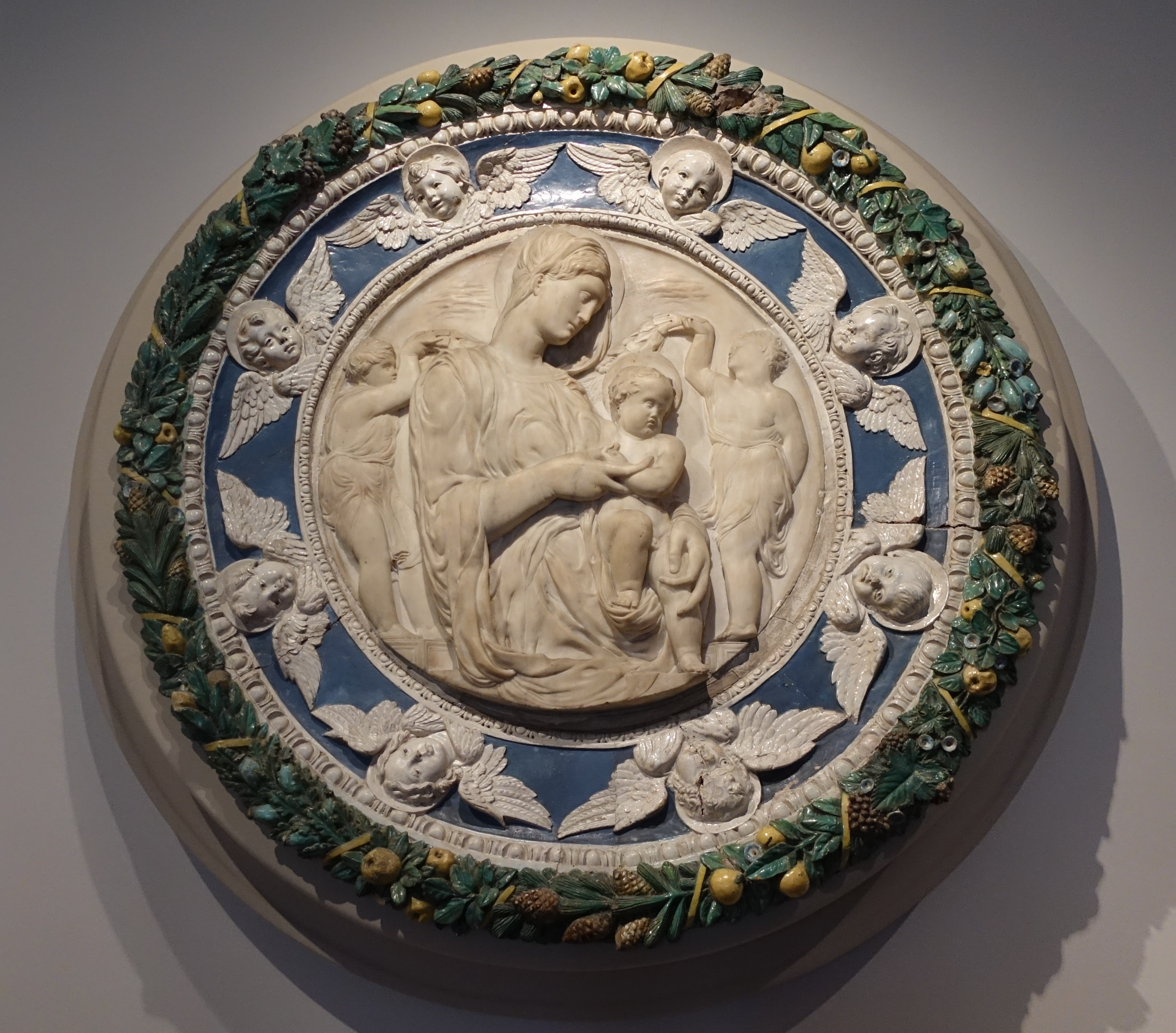
Relief of the Virgin Mary by Andrea della Robbia; 15th century.

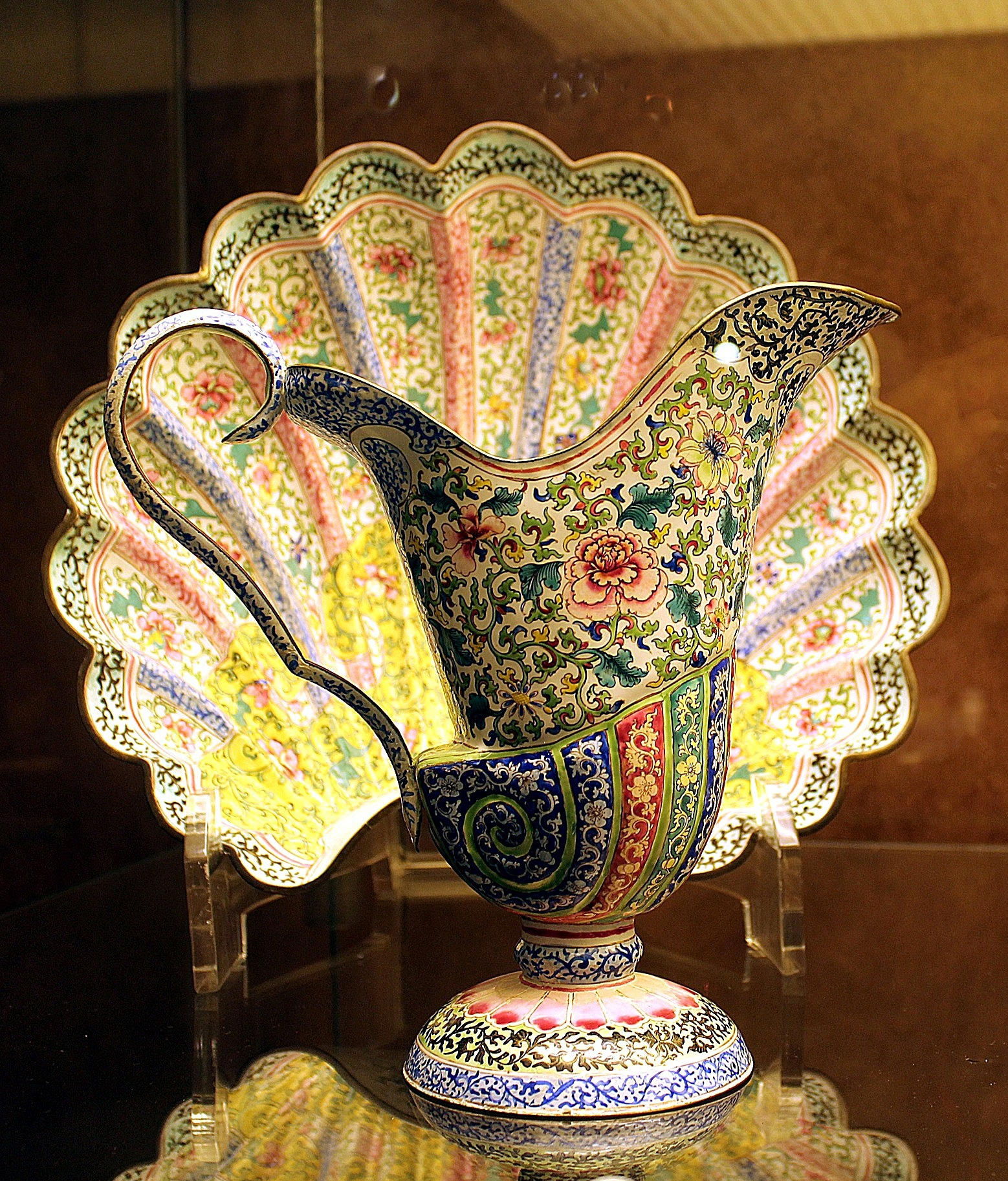
Portuguese vase; 18th century.

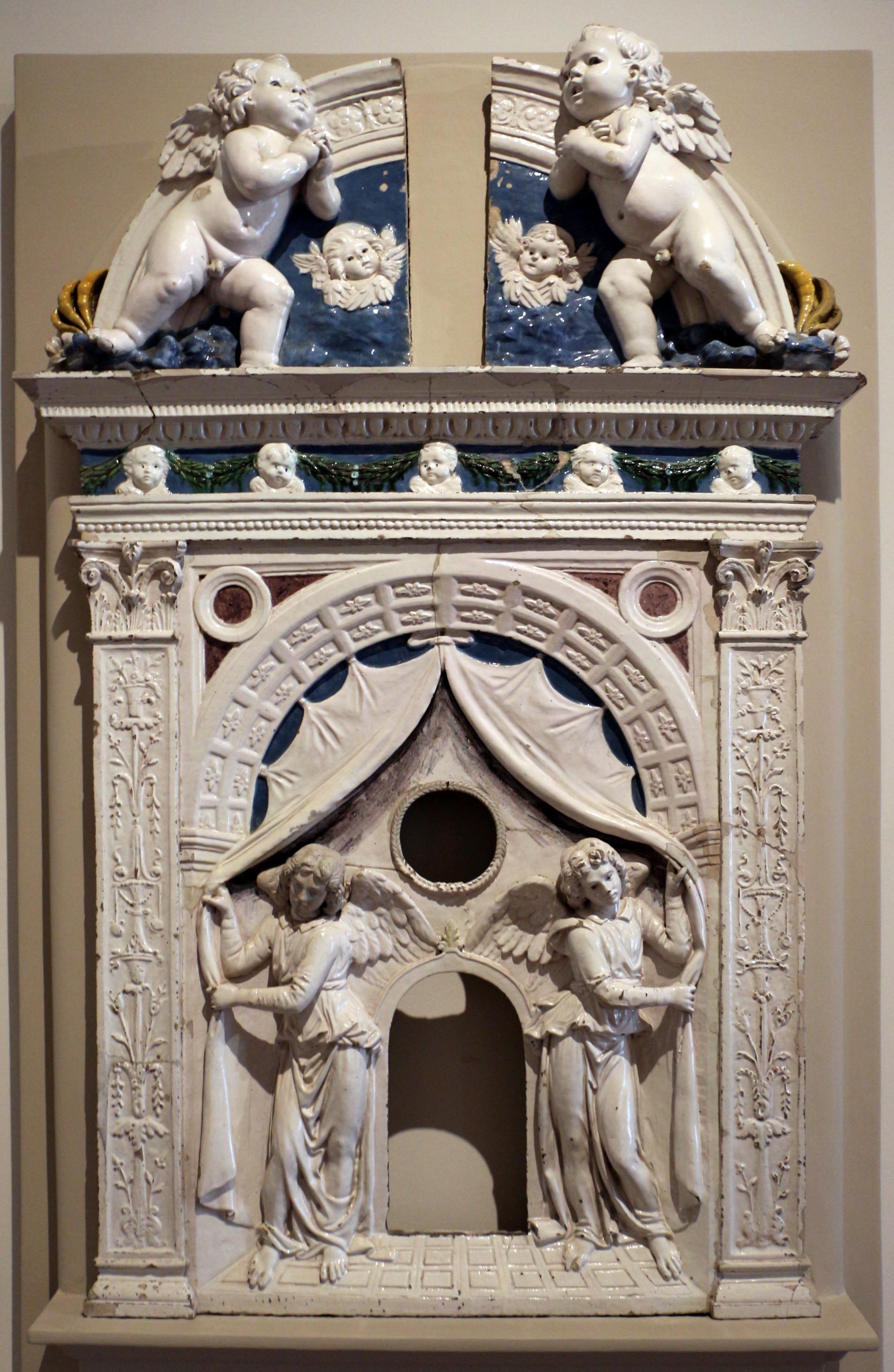
Tabernacle of the Eucharist by Andrea della Robbia; 1501–25.

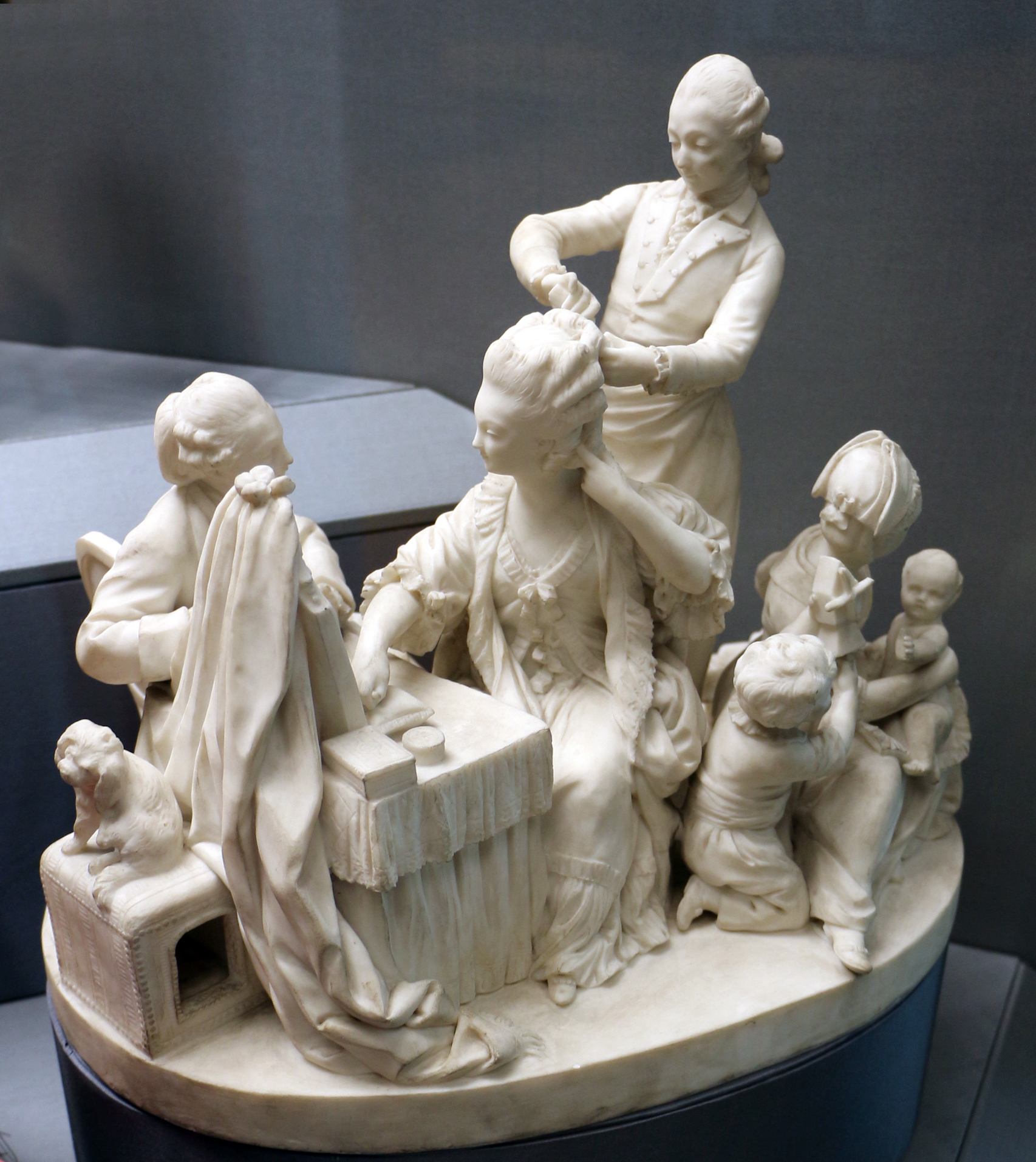
Sèvres porcelain; 1775.

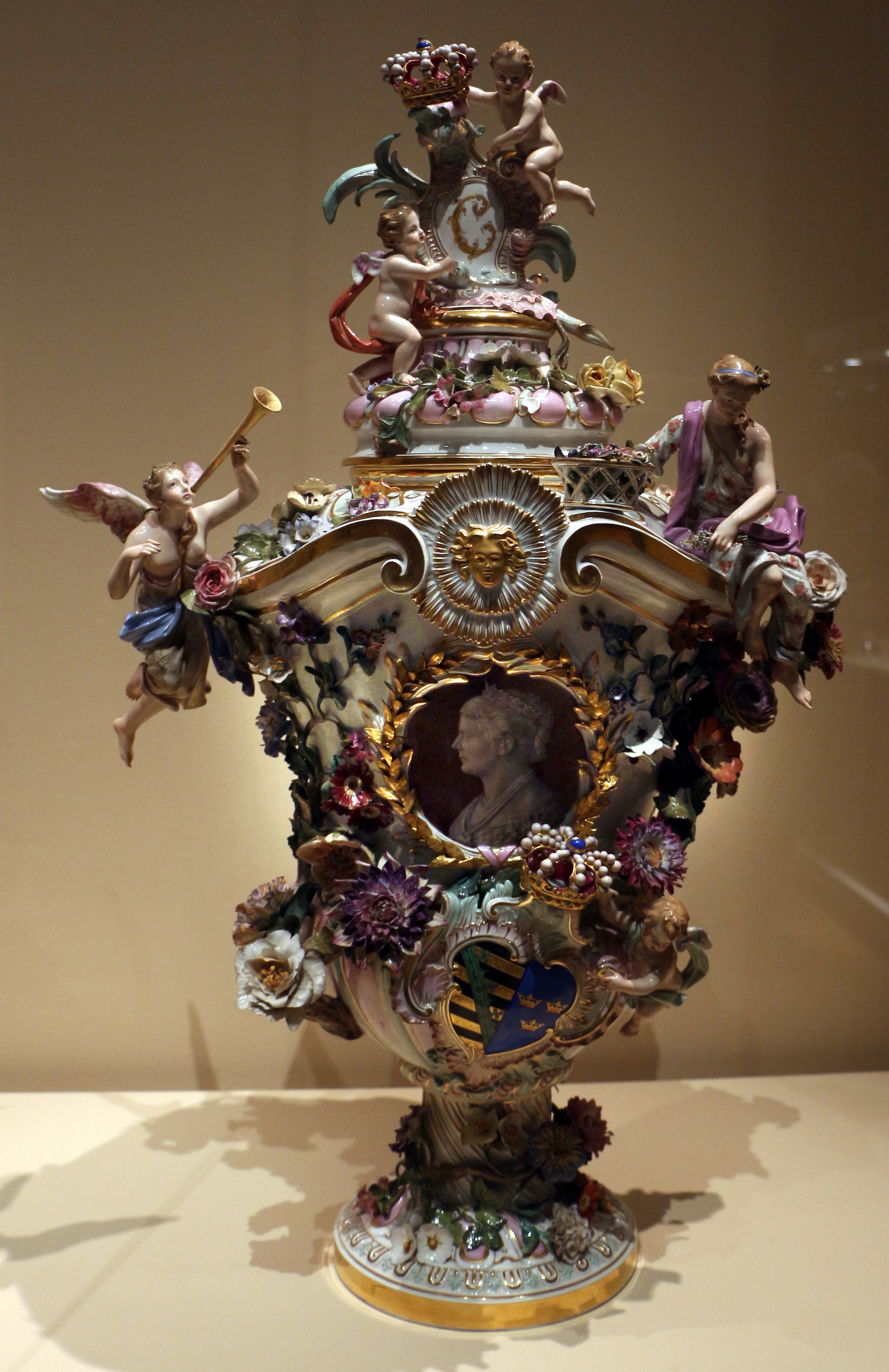
Meissen porcelain; c. 1860–80.

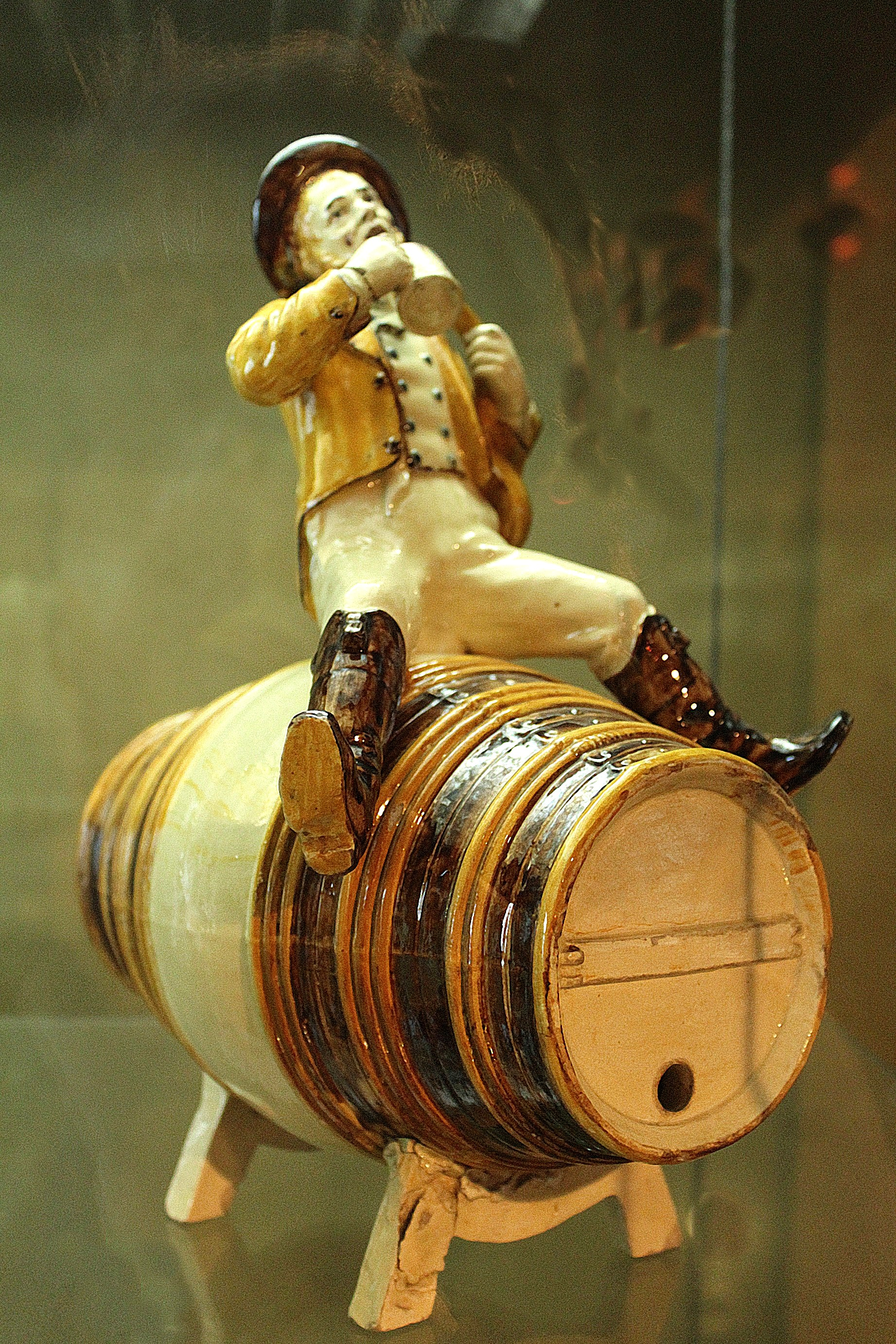
Drunkard on a Barrel; 19th century.

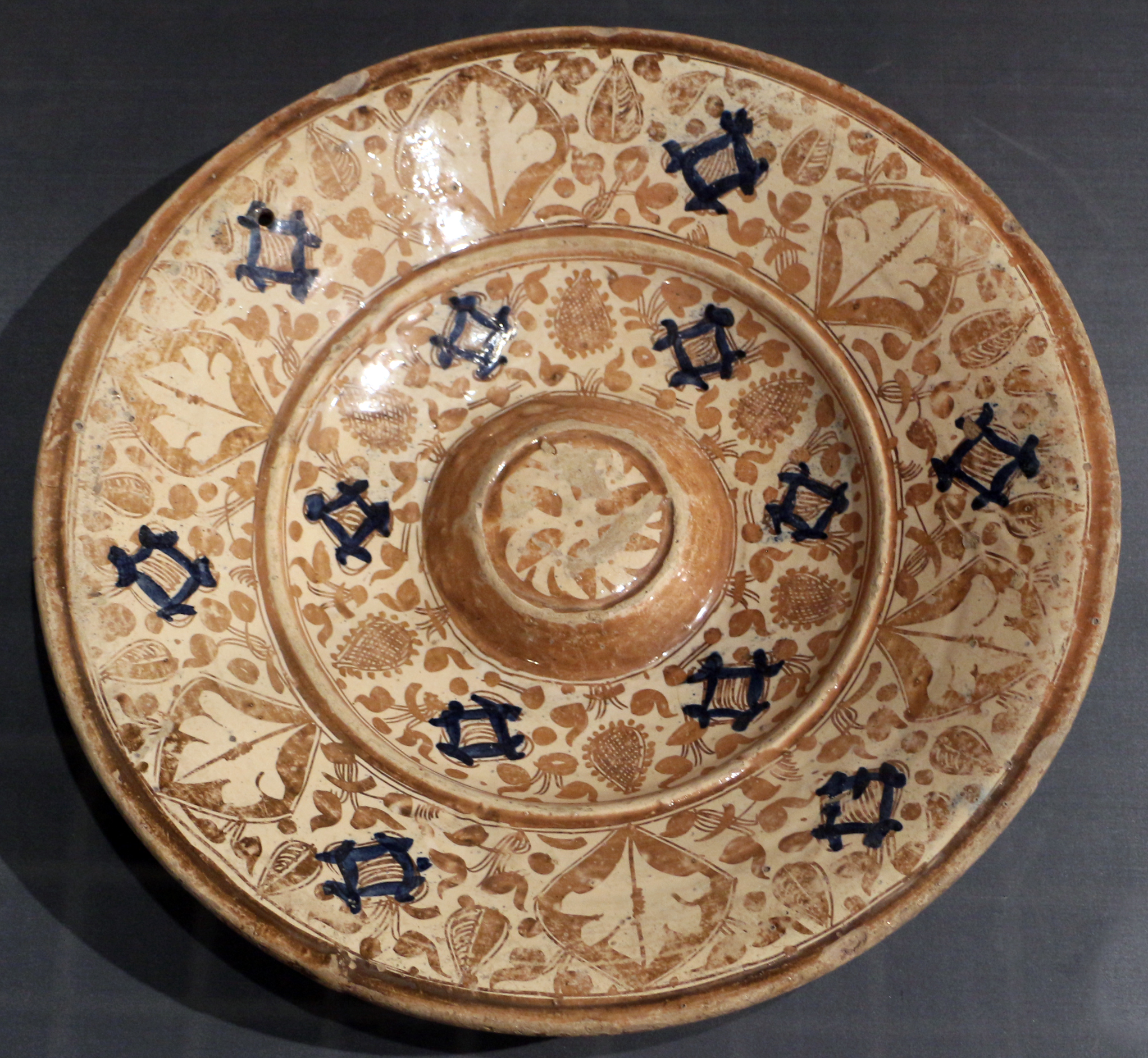
Hispano-Moresque ware; c. 1425–50.

== See also ==
- List of museums in Portugal
- List of largest art museums
- List of most visited art museums
