= Odland =

Odland is a surname. Notable people with the surname include:

- Bruce Odland, American composer
- Sigurd Odland (1857–1937), Norwegian theologian and church leader
- Steve Odland, American businessman

== Other ==
- Ödland, the French music band
- SS Odland, a Norwegian cargo ship in service 1908–22
- SS Odland 1, a Norwegian cargo ship in service 1922-28

== See also ==
- Aadland
