= Ottocento =

Ottocento is Italian for "eight hundred" and usually refers to the 19th century. It may also refer to:

- a variant of the tarot card game Tarocchini
- a 2010 album by Ödland
- a typeface developed by Nebiolo Printech

== See also ==
- Italian Neoclassical and 19th-century art
- History of Italy
