= SS Brita =

A number of steamships have been named Brita.

- SS Brita (1907), built by Neptung AG, Hamburg as Maid of Corfu, carried name Brita in the period 1930–45
- SS Brita (1908), Built by Sunderland Shipbuilding Co Ltd, Sunderland as Odland. Carried name Brita from 1928 to 1940
