= Aadland =

Other names
- Variant form: Odland

Aadland or Ådland is a Norwegian surname. Notable people with the surname include:

- Beverly Aadland (1942–2010), American actress
- Eivind Aadland (born 1956), Norwegian conductor and violinist
- Tom Roger Aadland (born 1964), Norwegian musician
- Wade Belak (1976–2011), Canadian ice hockey player, born Wade William Aadland

== See also ==
- Ådland, Norway, a village in Samnanger, Norway
- Odland
