= Francis 1st =

Tableware pattern by Reed & Barton

Francis 1st was an American sterling silver tableware pattern, introduced in 1906 by the manufacturer, Reed & Barton, named after King Francis I of France. Production ended in 2019.

== Design ==
It was designed by Ernest Meyer, a French silversmith. His goal was to create a pattern that eclipsed the splendid Renaissance-Baroque metalwork of Benvenuto Cellini, court artist and sculptor in the court of King Francis I who ascended the French throne in 1515. It took him three years to design.

The pattern is unique, given that—unlike other flatware patterns—it has fifteen different fruit-and-flower clusters. Each handle bears one of these detailed designs.

It has been claimed that the design idea came from one of the many tableware patterns of the Italian silver manufacturer Cesa 1882.

== Production ==
Francis 1st flatware was produced by Reed & Barton Silversmiths. The original backstamp featured a lion, an eagle, and the letter “R”; Commonly called "Eagle-R-Lion". in about 1950 a new backstamp came into use which reads “Reed and Barton".

This flatware was made in the US and is warranted by its production company for 100 years.

Three American Presidents (Wilson, Truman, and Eisenhower) have owned the Francis 1st tableware pattern.
