= Germain Service =

18th-century tableware set

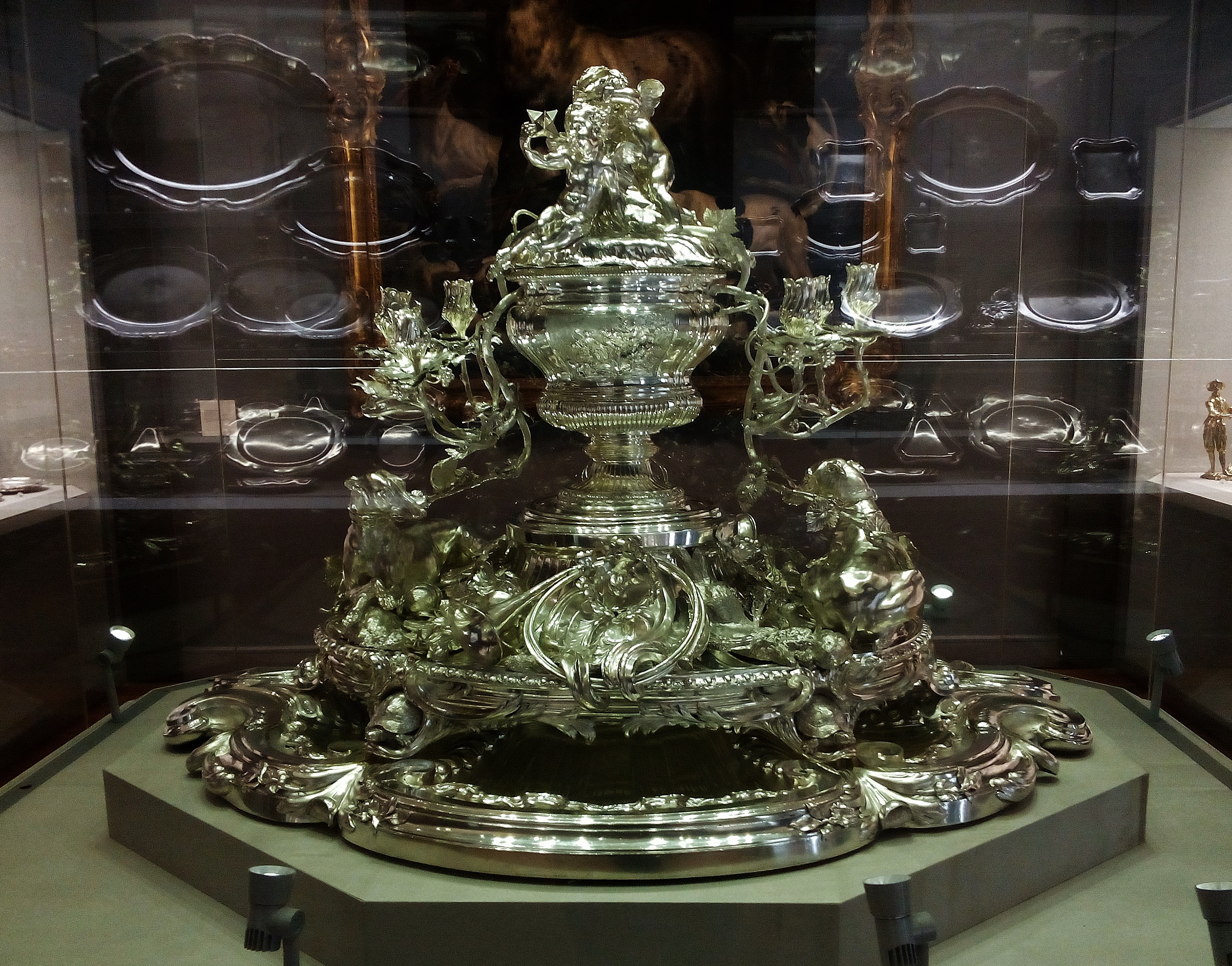
- The surtout de table of the Germain Service
- Material: Silver
- Created: 1750s–1760s
- Present location: National Museum of Ancient Art, Lisbon

The Germain Service is an 18th-century tableware set comprising more than a thousand pieces in cast, raised, and chiselled silver, made in the workshop of French silversmith François-Thomas Germain for the Portuguese royal family. This service is now on permanent exhibition as part of the collection of the National Museum of Ancient Art, in Lisbon, Portugal.

The service was commissioned by Joseph I of Portugal in 1756, just after the 1755 Lisbon earthquake, in an attempt to renew the splendor of the royal court (as the earthquake had, in the words of Royal Jewel Keeper António Pinto da Silva, "[reduced] to ashes all treasure and tapestries of the Royal Household, sparing nothing"); there were, however, troubles in the consignment of the service: in 1765, Germain declared bankruptcy and the order was left unfinished (which precipitated the Portuguese Crown to start a legal dispute to reclaim the loss of the goods, to no avail). One of the most expressive elements of a great à la française service was missing: the fourth-course surtout. Still, the Germain Service was considered the First Service of the Crown, to which was added the service confiscated from the Duke of Aveiro in 1759 (the Second Service)—they both made up "all necessary tableware" for court feasts.

The Germain Service was used publicly for the first time during the ceremonies of the Acclamation of Queen Maria I, the daughter of Joseph I, on 13 May 1777.

In 2006, the Germain Service was made part of the Ministry of Culture's list of Portuguese National Treasures.

== Gallery ==
Pieces from the Germain Service
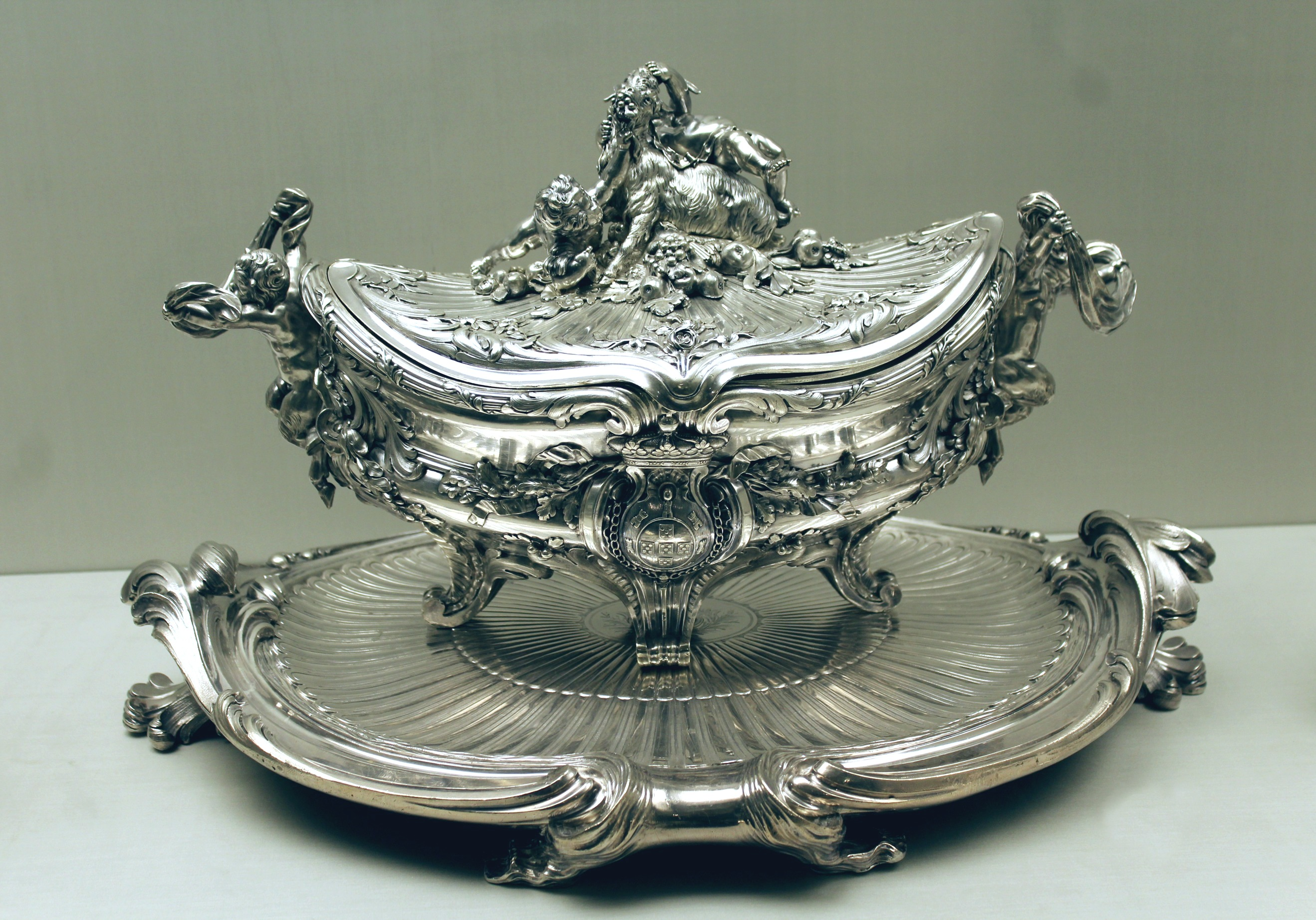
Tureen

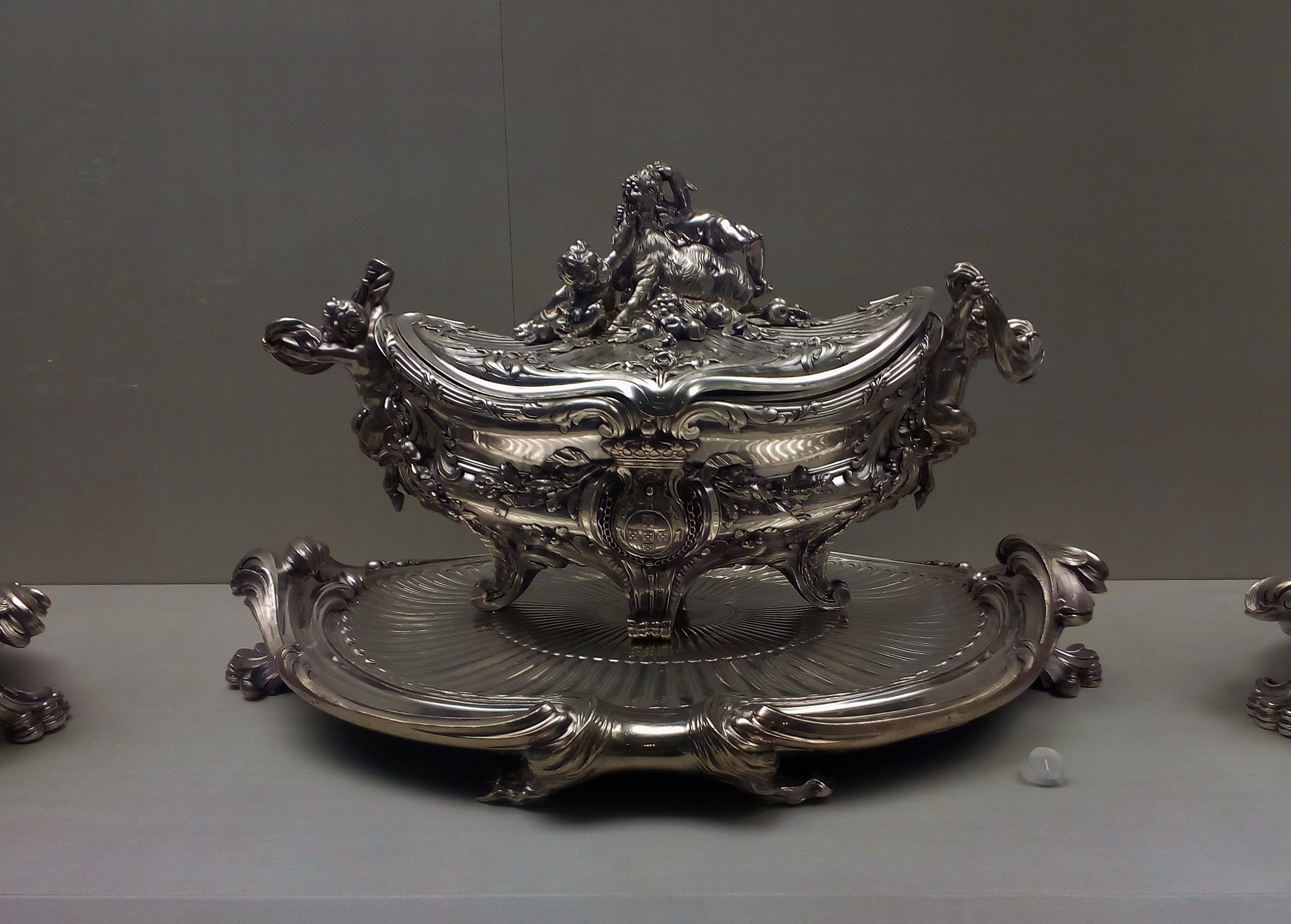
Tureen

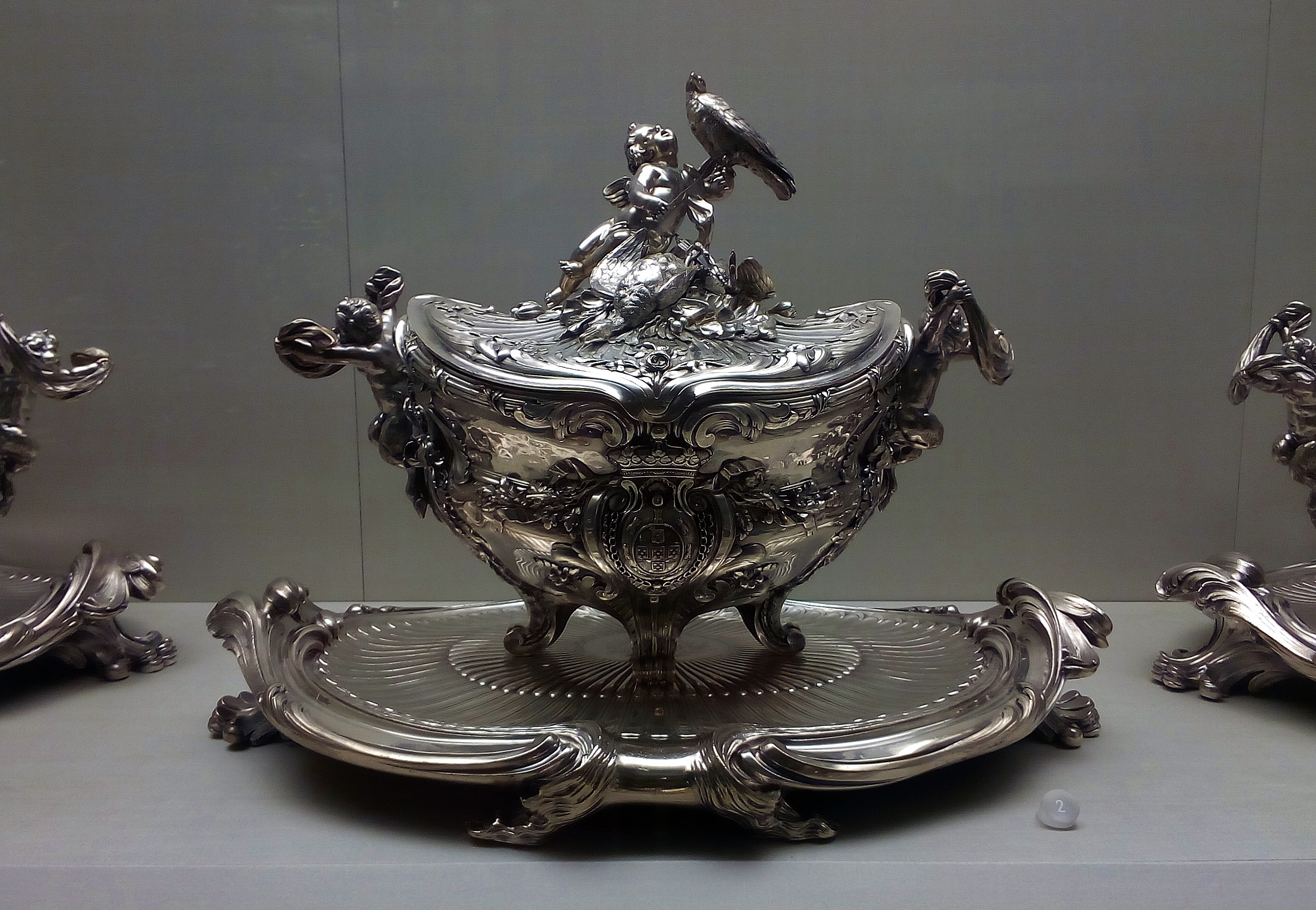
Pot-à-oille

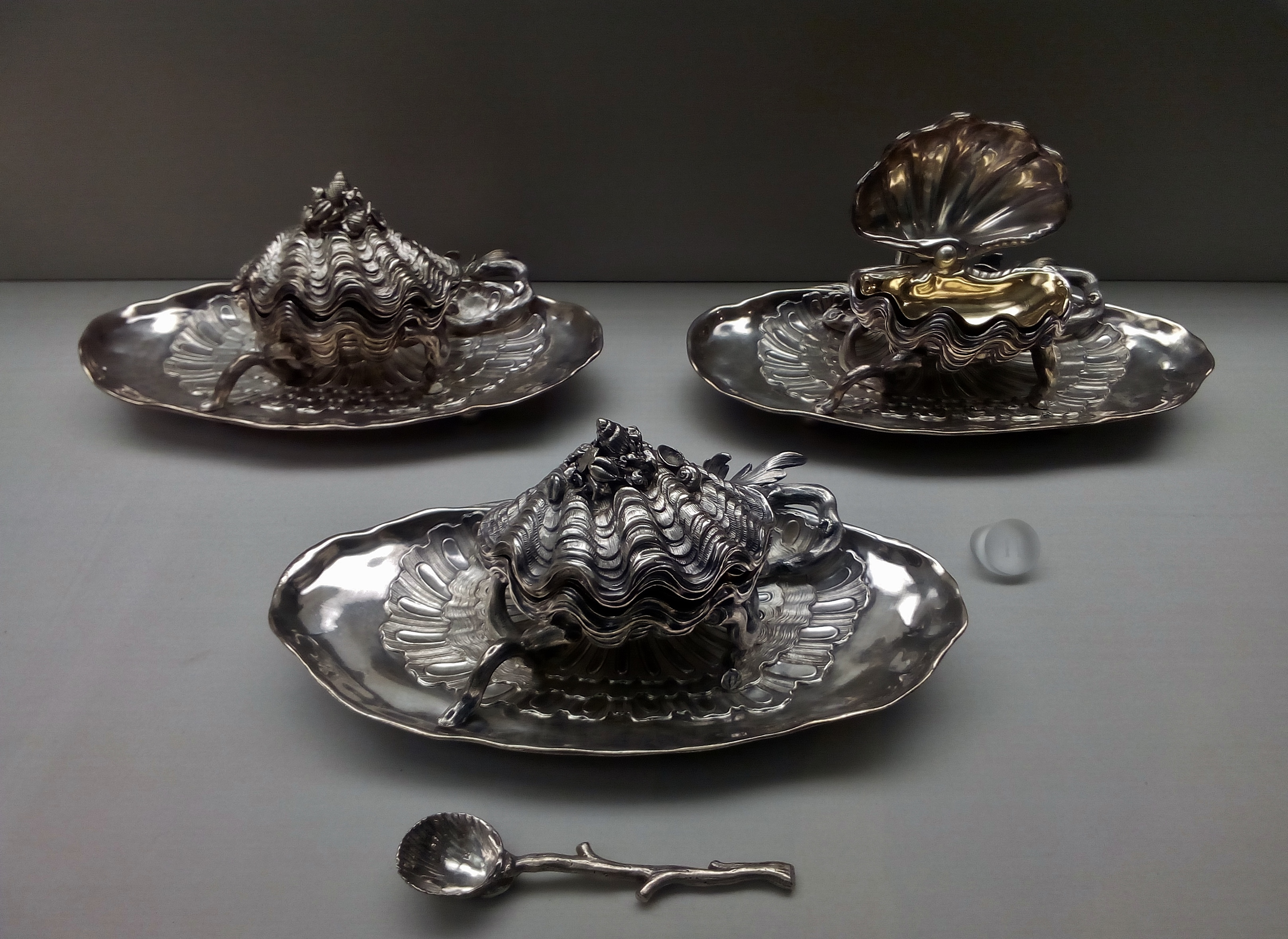
Salt pots

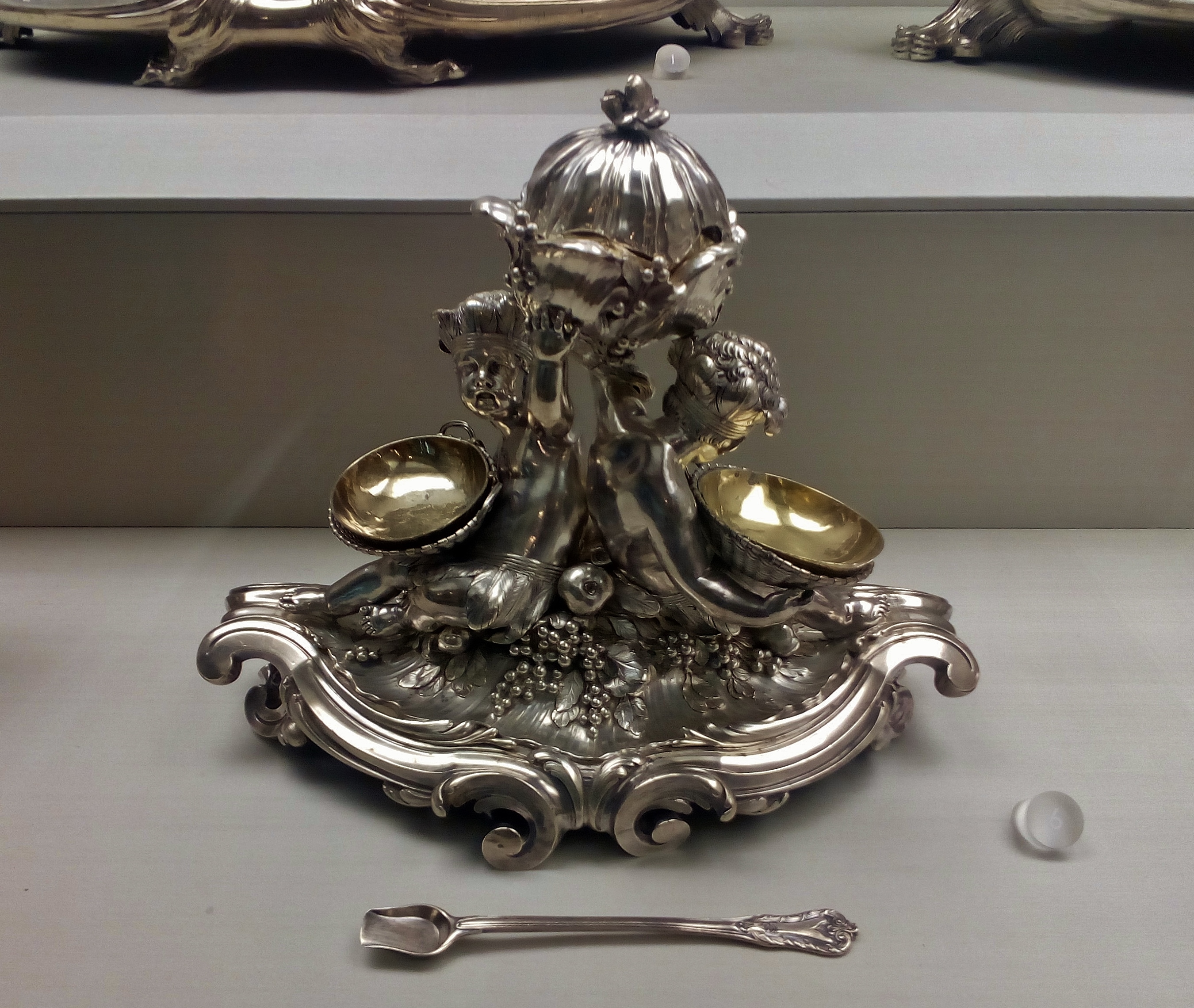
Spice pots

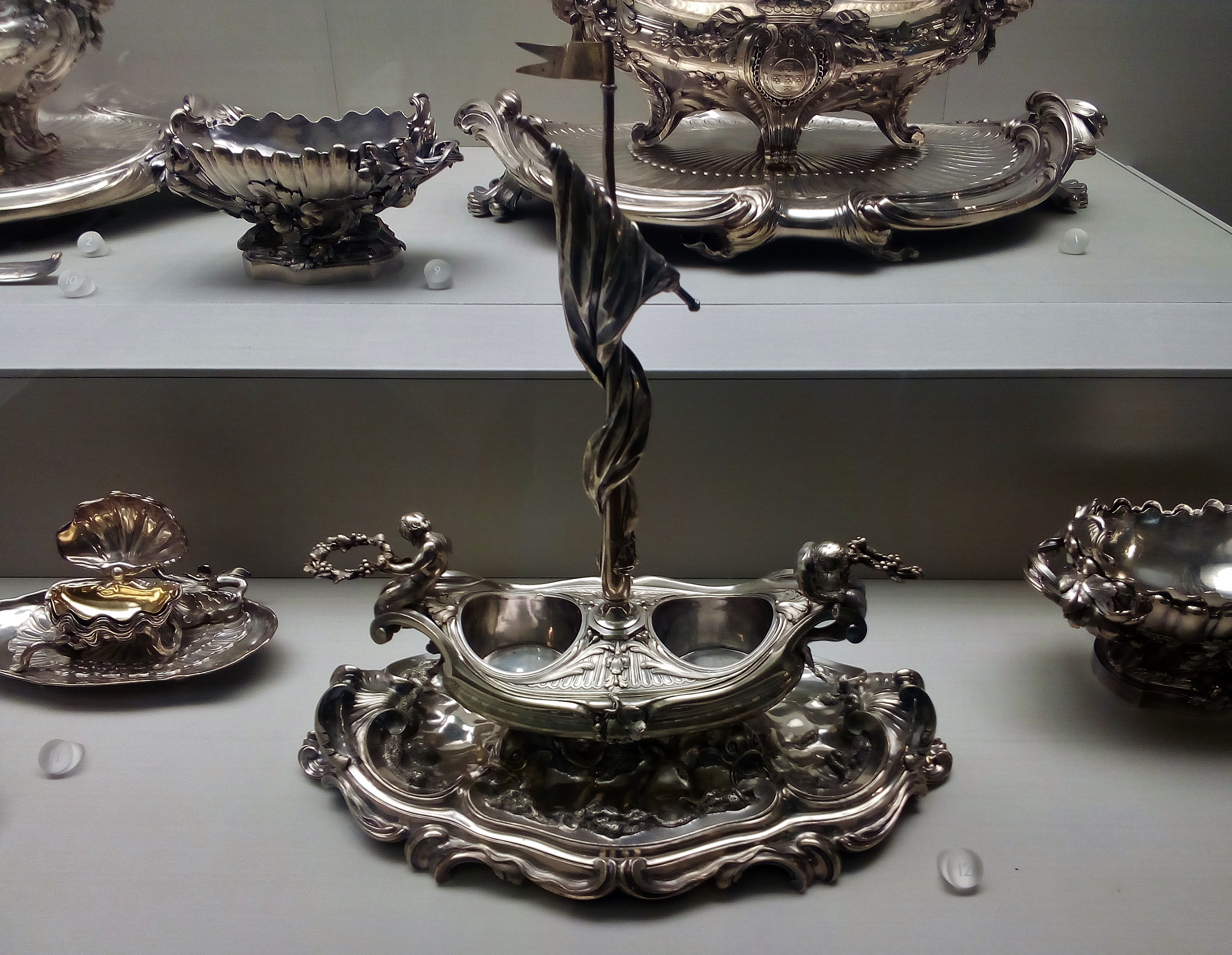
Cruet-stand

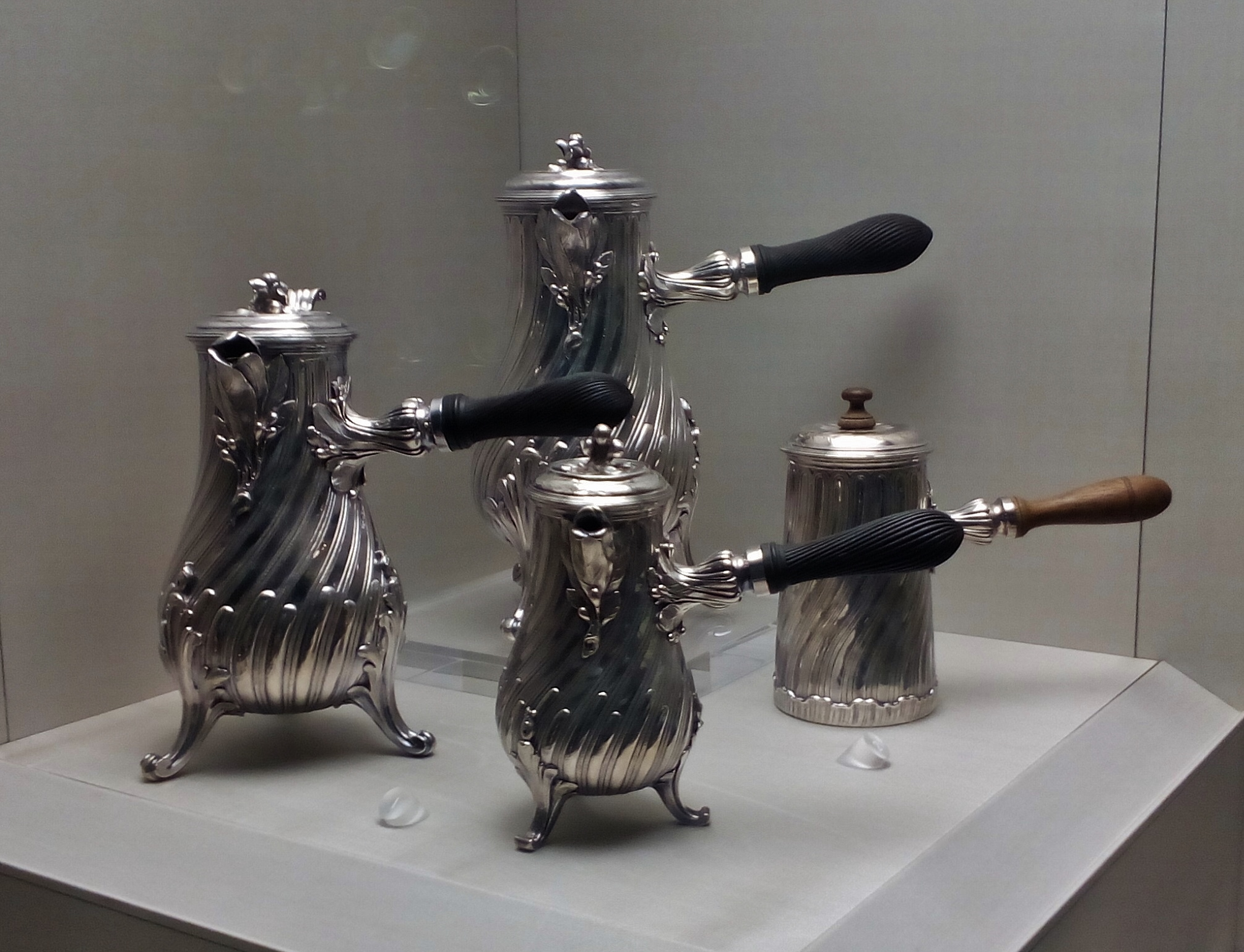
Coffee and cocoa pots

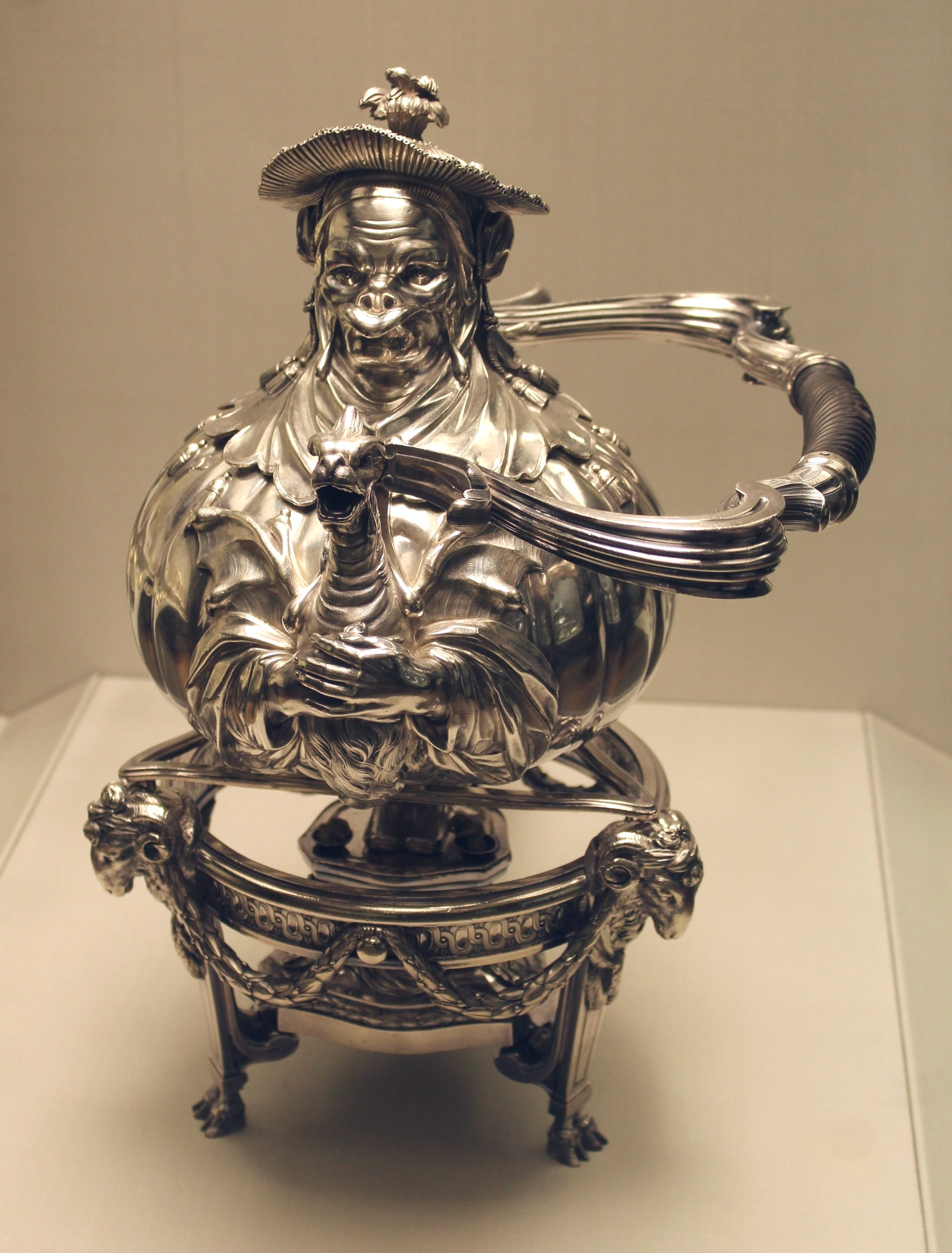
Grotesque teapot
