= SS Brita (1908) =

1908 cargo ship from Norway

History
- Name: Odland (1908-22); Odland 1 (1922-28); Brita (1928-40); Desiderus Siedler (1940-45); Empire Connell (1945-47); Ballyholme Bay (1947-51); Laure Pattison (1951-52)
- Owner: Dampskibsakties Odland (1908-22); Borre Dampskibsselskap AS (1922-24); Dampskibs AS Martha (1924-28); Rederi AB Väsby (1928-40); German Government (1940-45); Ministry of War Transport (1945); Ministry of Transport (1945-47); H P Lenaghan & Sons (1947-51); Pattison Orient Line (1951-52)
- Operator: H Fredriksen (1908-22); Borre Dampskibsselskap AS (1922-24); Dampskibs AS Martha (1924-28); Filip Ohlsson (1928-40); F G Rheingold (1940-45); Charles M Willie & Co (Shipping) Ltd (1945-47); H P Lenaghan & Sons (1947-51); Pattison Orient Lin (1951-52)
- Port of registry: (Norway) Christiania (1908-28); (Sweden) Lerberget (1928-40); (Germany) Danzig (1940-45); (United Kingdom) London (1945-47); (United Kingdom) Belfast (1947-51); (British Hong Kong) Hong Kong (1951-52)
- Builder: Sunderland Shipbuilding Co Ltd
- Launched: 14 April 1908
- Identification: Code Letters KGNJ (1928-34); Code Letters SDMI (1934-40); Code Letters GNMN (1945-47); Swedish Official Number 7447 (1928-40); United Kingdom Official Number 180693 (1945-47)
- Fate: Scrapped

General characteristics
- Type: Cargo ship
- Tonnage: 998 GRT; 575 NRT
- Length: 227 ft 4 in (69.29 m)
- Beam: 38 ft 1 in (11.61 m)
- Depth: 15 ft 3 in (4.65 m)
- Installed power: Triple expansion steam engine
- Propulsion: Screw propeller

Brita was a cargo ship that was built in 1908 by Sunderland Shipbuilding Ltd, Sunderland as Odland for Norwegian owners. A sale in 1922 saw her renamed Odland 1. In 1928, she was sold to Sweden and renamed Brita. She was seized by Germany in 1940 at Bergen, Norway and impressed into service under the name Desiderus Siedler. In May 1945, she was seized by the Allies at Copenhagen, passed to the Ministry of War Transport (MoWT) and renamed Empire Connell. In 1947, she was sold into merchant service and renamed Ballyholme Bay. In 1951, she was sold to Hong Kong and renamed Laure Pattison. She served until 1952, when she was scrapped.

== Description ==
The ship was built in 1908 by Sunderland Shipbuilding Co Ltd, Sunderland.

The ship was 227 feet 4 inches (69.29 m) long, with a beam of 38 feet 1 inch (11.61 m). She had a depth of 15 feet 3 inches (4.65 m). The ship had a GRT of 1,252 and a NRT of 704.

The ship was propelled by a triple expansion steam engine, which had cylinders of 17 1/2 inches (44 cm), 29 inches (74 cm) and 48 inches (120 cm) diameter by 33 inches (84 cm). The engine was built by North East Marine Engine Co Ltd, Sunderland.

== History ==
Odland was built for Dampskibsakties Odland. She was placed under the management of H Fredriksen, Christiania. In June 1909, Odland was driven ashore in Murray Bay, Quebec, Canada. On 16 March 1920, Odland rescued the crew of the British schooner Rosa Harriette in the English Channel, off St Catherine's Point, Isle of Wight. The Board of Trade awarded her captain a piece of plate for rescuing the crew of Rosa Harriette, who had been adrift for 16 hours. In 1922, Odland was sold to Borre Dampskibsselskap AS and renamed Odland 1. In 1924, she was sold to Dampskibs AS Martha and renamed Brita. In 1928, she was sold to Rederi AB Väsby, Sweden. Her port of registry was changed to Lergerbet. The Code Letters KGNJ and Swedish Official Number 7447 were allocated. Brita was operated under the management of Filip Ohlsson. In 1934, her code letters were changed to SDMI.

On 9 April 1940, Brita was in port at Bergen, Norway while on a voyage from Sweden to France with a cargo of woodpulp when she was seized by German forces. She was transferred to a German port the following month and in December 1940 the Prize Court in Hamburg declared that her cargo was contraband. Ownership of Brita was assumed by the German Government. Brita was renamed Desiderus Siedler and placed under the management of F G Rheingold, Danzig.

In May 1945, Desiderus Siedler was seized by the Allies at Copenhagen. She was passed to the MoWT and renamed Empire Connell. Her port of registry was changed to London and she was placed under the management of Charles M Willie & Co (Shipping) Ltd. The Code Letters GNMN and United Kingdom Official Number were allocated. In 1947, Empire Connell was sold to H P Lenaghan & Sons Ltd, Belfast and was renamed Ballyholme Bay. (Ballyholme Bay is off Bangor, County Down, Northern Ireland, and US troops trained there for the Normandy landings of World War II.) In 1951, she was sold to Pattison Orient Line, Hong Kong and was renamed Laure Pattison, serving until 1952 when she was scrapped.
