= Ödland =

French band

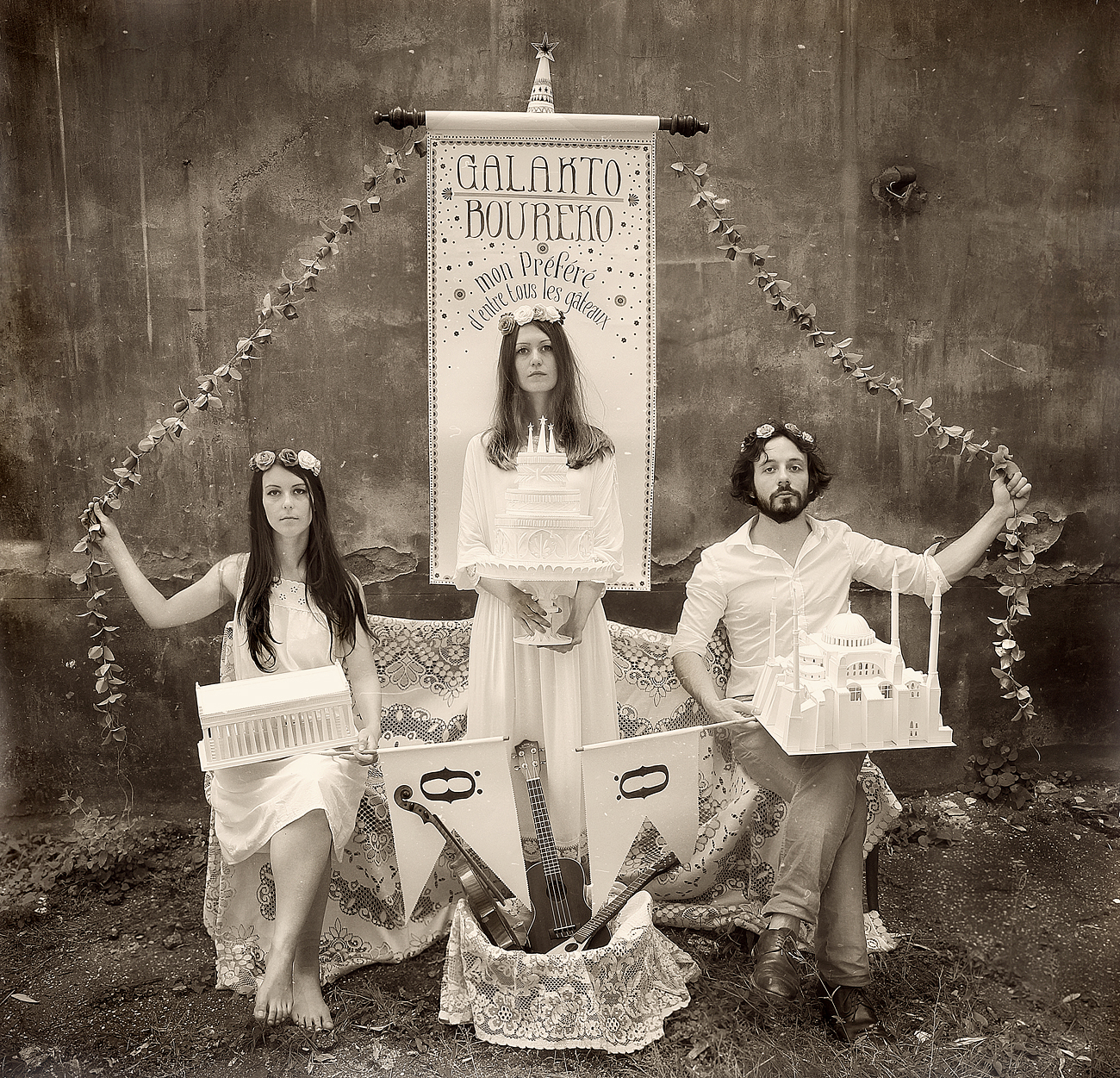
- Ödland Galaktoboureko; Lorenzo Papace, Alizée Bingöllü, Léa Bingöllü, Isabelle Royet-Journoud

Background information
- Origin: Lyon, France
- Genres: Classical music, Acoustic music, Folk music
- Years active: 2008–
- Members: Alizée Bingöllü; Lorenzo Papace; Léa Bingöllü
- Past members: Alice Tahon; Isabelle Royet-Journoud
- Website: odland.fr

Ödland is a French band from Lyon consisting of composer-songwriter Lorenzo Papace, and sisters Alizée Bingöllü (on vocals) and Léa Bingöllü (on violin). They have self-produced two albums: Ottocento (2010) and Sankta Lucia (2011).

The band draws its inspirations from 19th century music and European folklore. Ödland has a contemporary, acoustic, and poetic sound, enriched by a visual universe of videos and photography all produced by the members of the band themselves.

== History ==
The band Ödland was created on 13 December 2008, in Lyon under the lead of Lorenzo Papace, composer-songwriter, accompanied by the Bingöllü sisters. Alizée Bingöllü is the singer and an actress, Léa Bingöllü is the violinist. Ödland draws its inspirations from 19th century music and European folklore. Ödland has a contemporary, acoustic, and poetic sound, enriched by a visual universe that includes videos and photographs. The band has remained independent since its beginning: To date, it has self-produced four records: The Caterpillar, an EP in 2008; Zoophyte, a 45-rpm vinyl in 2010; and two albums, Ottocento and Sankta Lucia in 2010 and 2011 respectively.

Ödland went on two tours in 2010 in England and Germany with Ottocento and another tour through Germany in 2012 to support their album Sankta Lucia. A fourth band member Isabelle Royet-Journoud left the band in June 2012.

== Idioms and inspirations ==
Ödland get their inspiration from 19th century music, like romantic music, Russian neoclassicism and ragtime. Their musical universe is extensive but hard to categorise or nail down. While Ödland project is completely acoustic in nature it praises the return to the antique objects displaced by current props of music groups in circulation. Ödland's influences are Frédéric Chopin, Béla Bartók, Franz Liszt, Erik Satie, Maurice Ravel, Georges Bizet apart from a lot of traditional music from Europe. Their video clips and photography make for a unique, self-consistent world which is portrayed in their live acts through the recopy the same sound quality as in their recording along with the props.

=== Wonderland theme ===
Lewis Carroll's influence was very strong in their first album Ottocento. The tracks like "The Caterpillar", "Drink Me", "The Queen of Hearts", "The Well", "De l'autre côté du miroir" and "Un thé chez les fous" are directly inspired by Alice's Adventures in Wonderland. Videos like "The Well" and "The Queen of Hearts" pay a tribute to this imaginary universe, childish and gloomy at the same time. Most of their lyrics are in French, but they kept the Carroll songs in English.

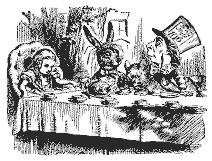
Mad Tea Party from Alice in Wonderland

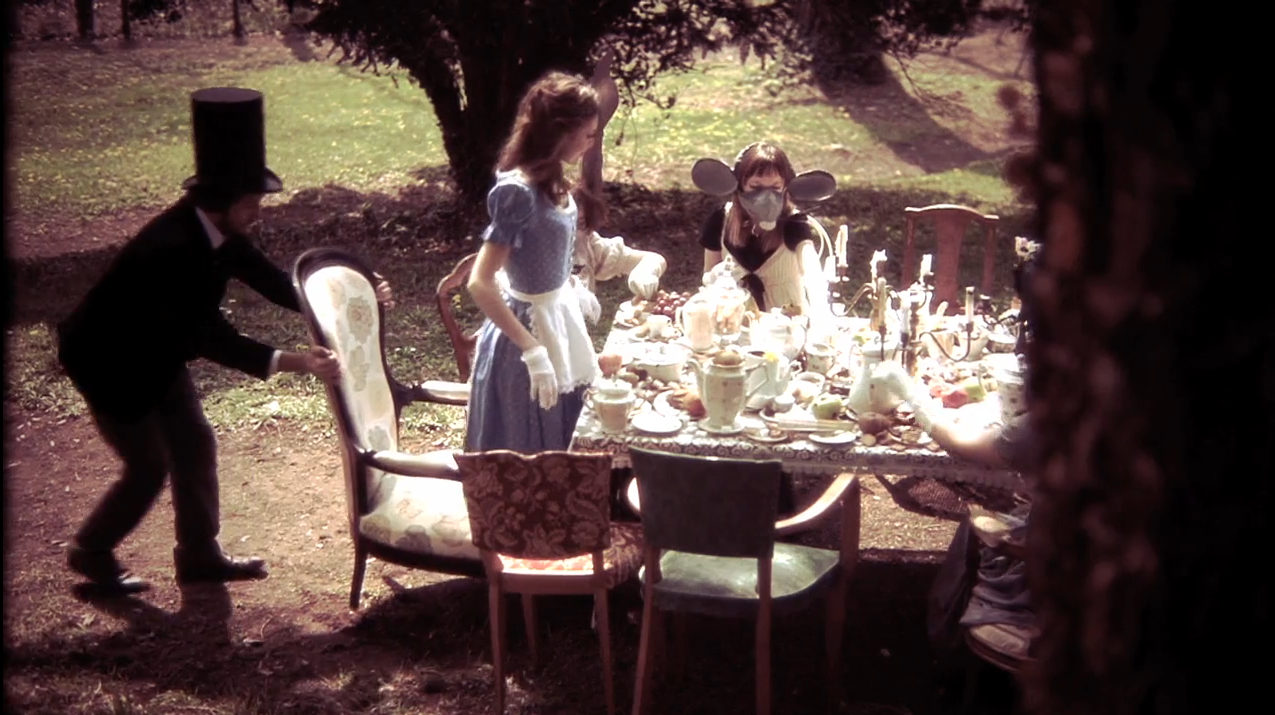
From the music video for "The Well"

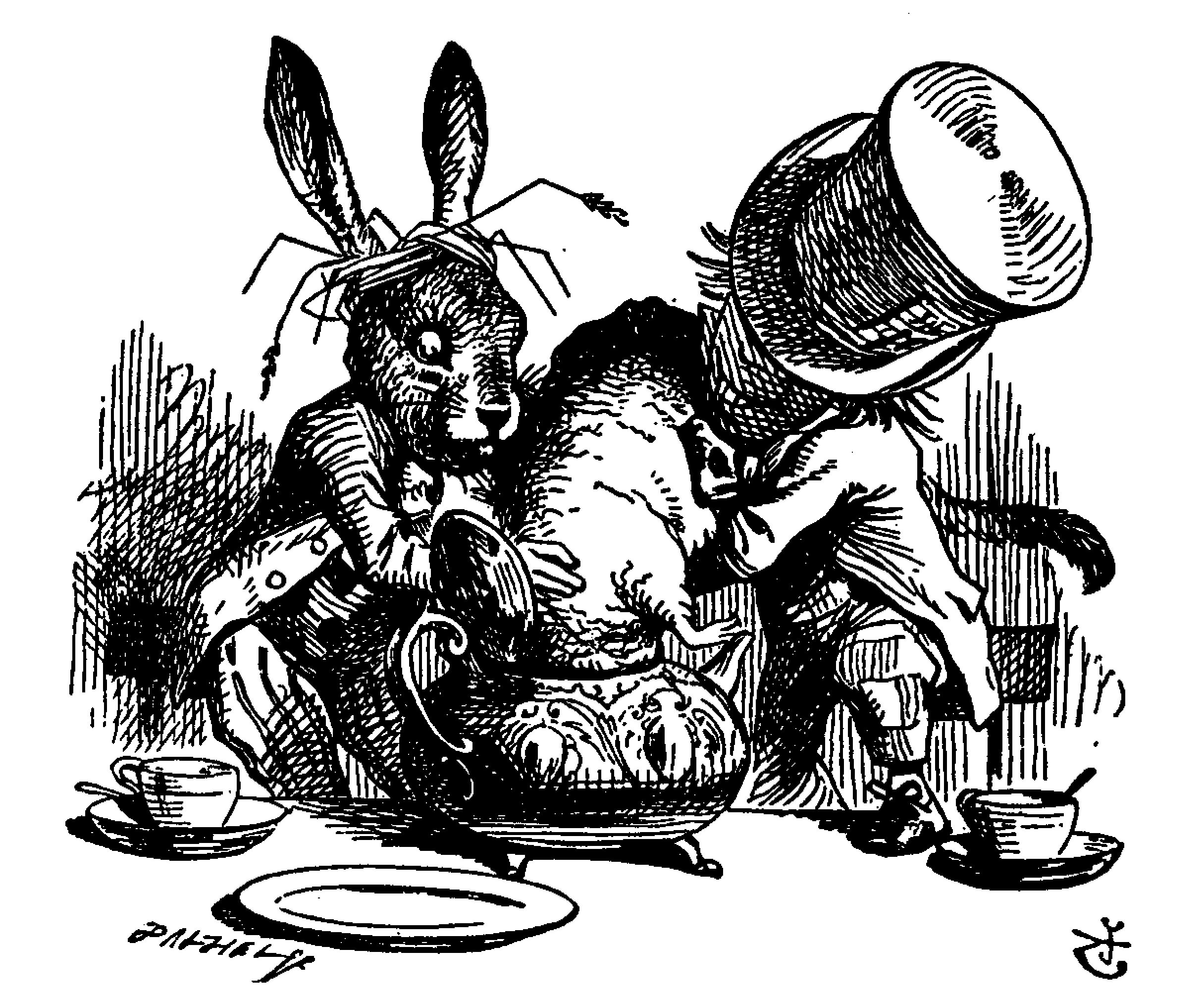
Mad Tea Party from Alice in Wonderland)

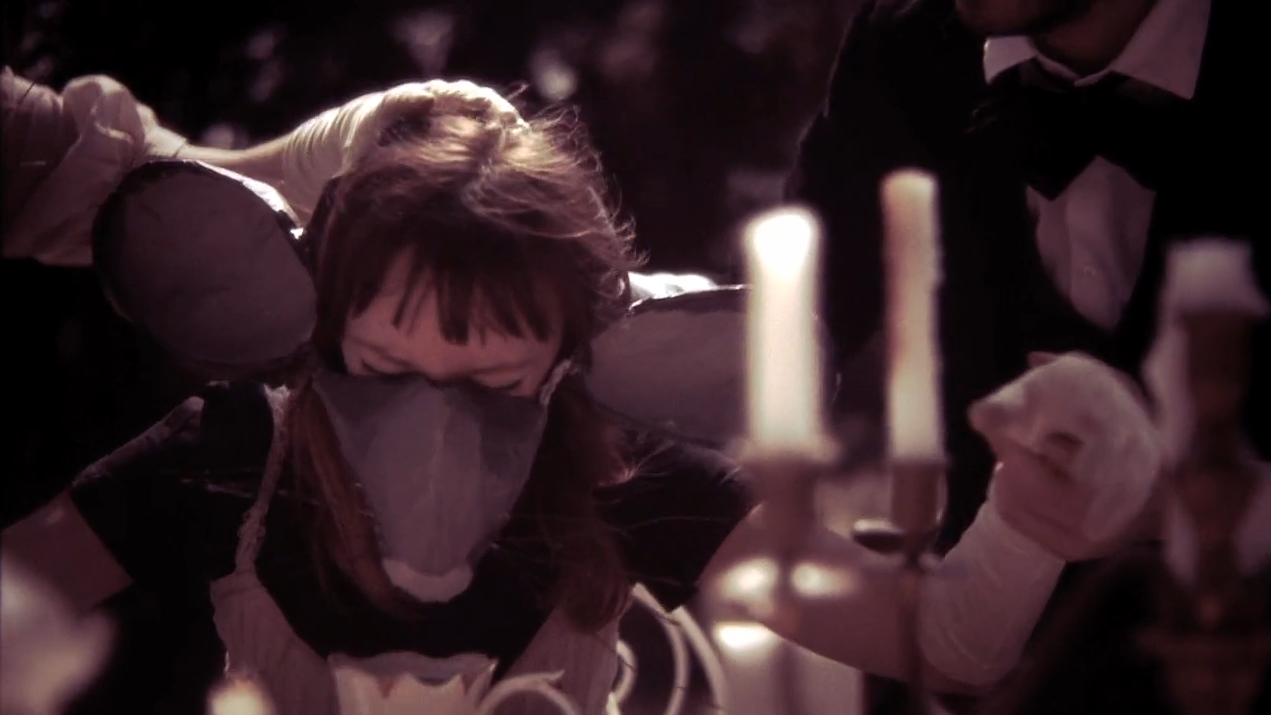
From the music video for "The Well"

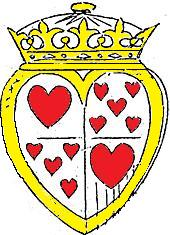
Coat of Arms of Wonderland from Alice in Wonderland

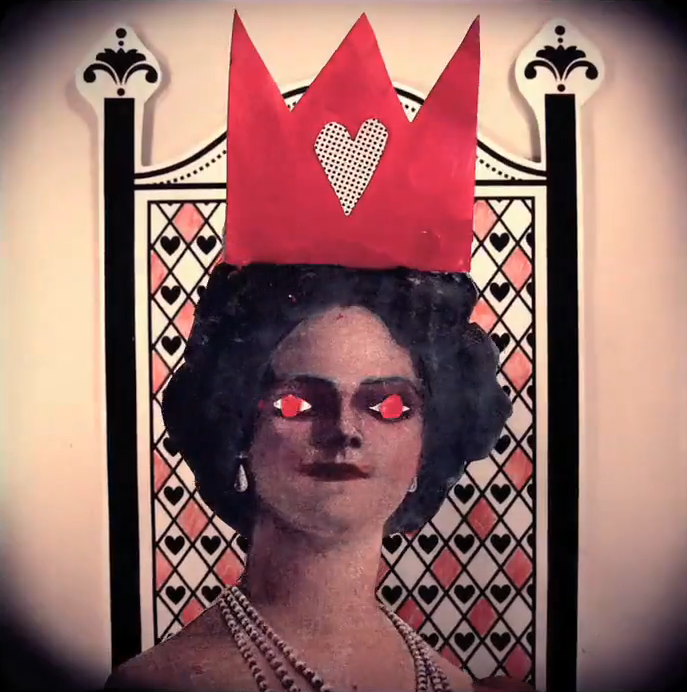
From the music video for "The Queen of Hearts"

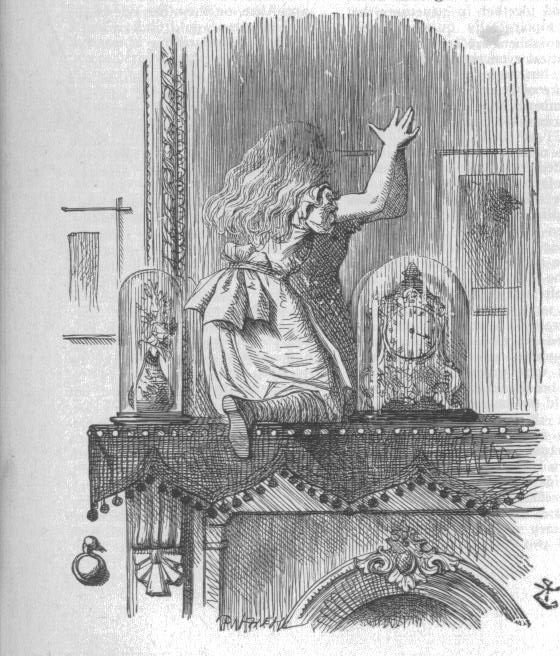
Looking-glass room from Alice in Wonderland

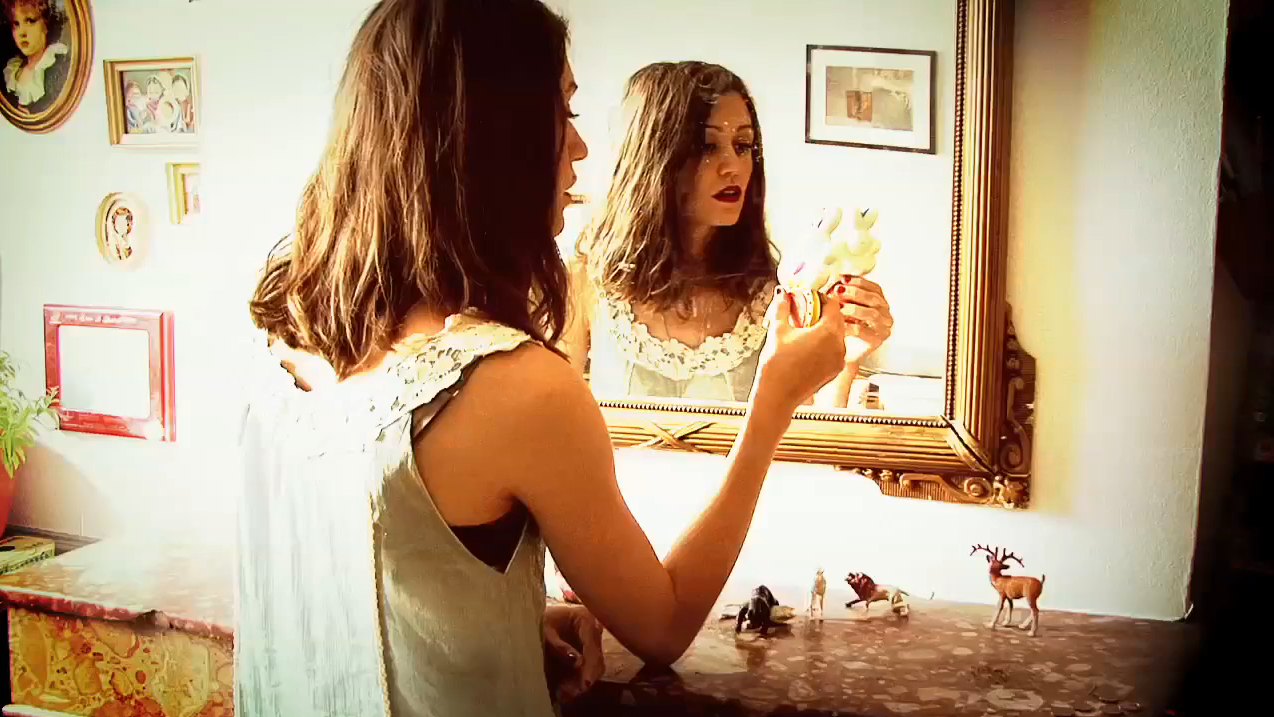
From the music video for "The Caterpillar"

=== 19th-century science culture ===
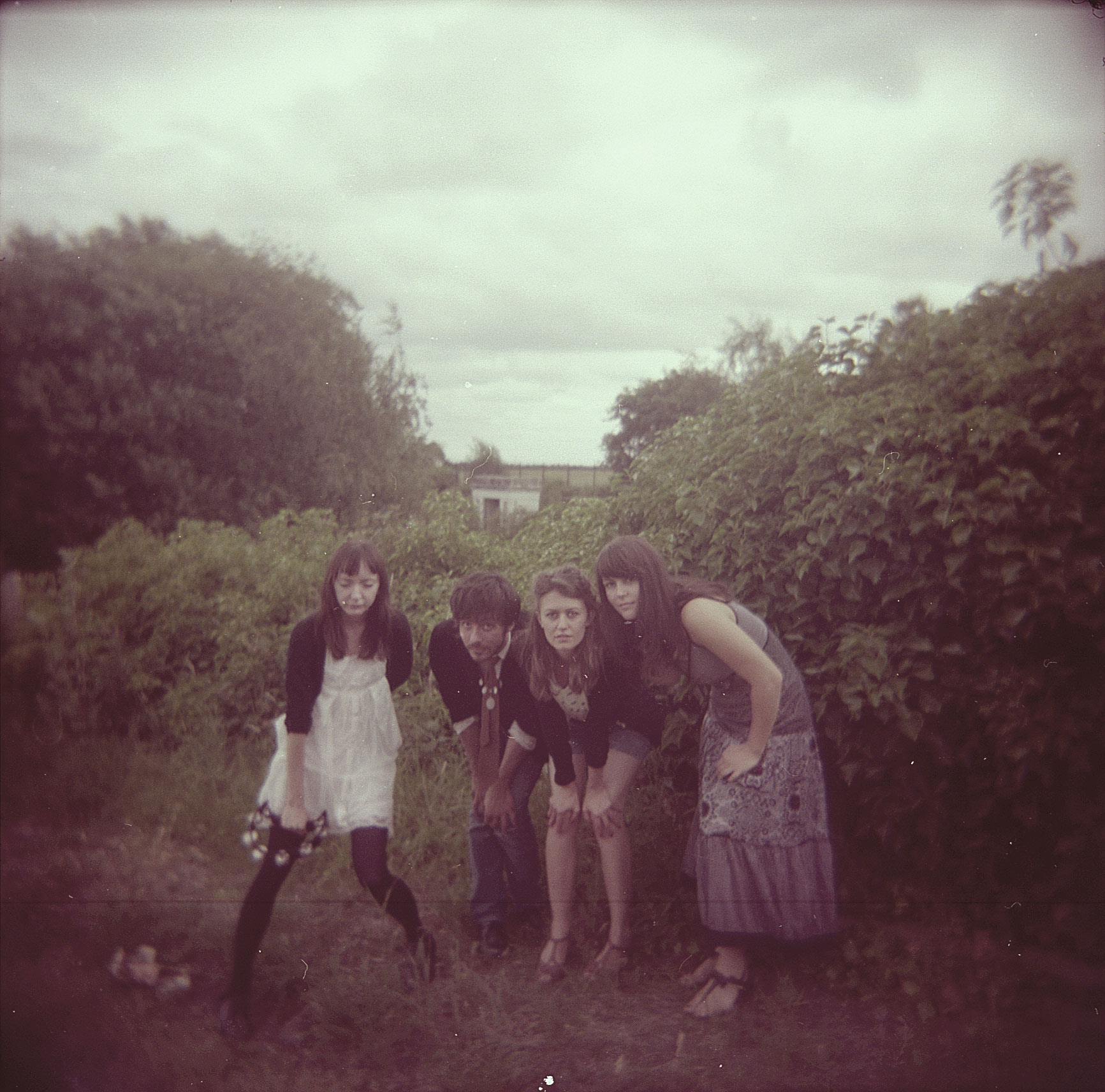
Ödland in front of William Huskisson's memorial, 2010

The band frequently also focus on nineteenth-century science and invention in their songs. "De Vienne à Paris" recounts the invention of the telephone, "Halogénures d'argent" depicts photography's chemical process, "Train" describes the death of William Huskisson, the first victim of a railway accident on the Liverpool-Manchester service. During their 2010 tour, the band made a pilgrimage in homage to William Huskisson. They went to his grave in Liverpool (also his place of death), visited The Rocket, the locomotive which killed him in York, and visited his statue in London.

Biology also inspires the band. The CD Zoophyte recounts about the surprising life of the Cecidomyiidae fly and touches upon the bamboo blossoming mystery. Both of these tracks on the CD reference Stephen Jay Gould the paleontologist who wrote Ever Since Darwin. The band also creates poems and other writing from these historic scientific and technical phenomena.

=== L'Europe ===
European identity is really important in Ödland's work. Lorenzo Papace is Italian, and the Bingöllüs Turkish, and their band is based in Lyon.

Ödland means desert or fallow in German and derives from a Scandinavian tale which arouses dream and mystery according to the member of the band. Ödland is also a Swedish forest near Östersund. Once Papace inadvertently went there while travelling and since he found a mystic connection between Scandinavian folklore and the visual universe of the band. The band was formed on Saint Lucy's Day, the band's use of pointed hats, and the giant bird ritual in the video for "Les yeux de l'oiseau" being similar to Kiruna's city symbol: All of these elements link the band to Scandinavia in the band's eyes.

Sankta Lucia their second album, is a trip through Europe, from the Greek seas to the Lapland woods. Every song is inspired by the music of a specific country: ancient Greek music in "La Grèce et moi" and "Thessaloniki", Hungarian music in "La joueuse de flûte" and "Ecseri Piac", the Klezmer in "Sextilis fugitif" and "Une nuit dans un train serbe", Italian music in "Piccioni Colorati" and "Santa Lucia", Polish music in "Warszawa" and "Trains possibles," and Austrian music with "Dummer Waltzer".

From countries and their history Ödland is inspired on subjects such as war, religion, wandering, Nazism, and travel. Sometimes some songs are focused on specific cities like Kiruna, Sweden, Östersund, Sweden, Venice, Sarajevo, Vienna, Budapest, and Athens.

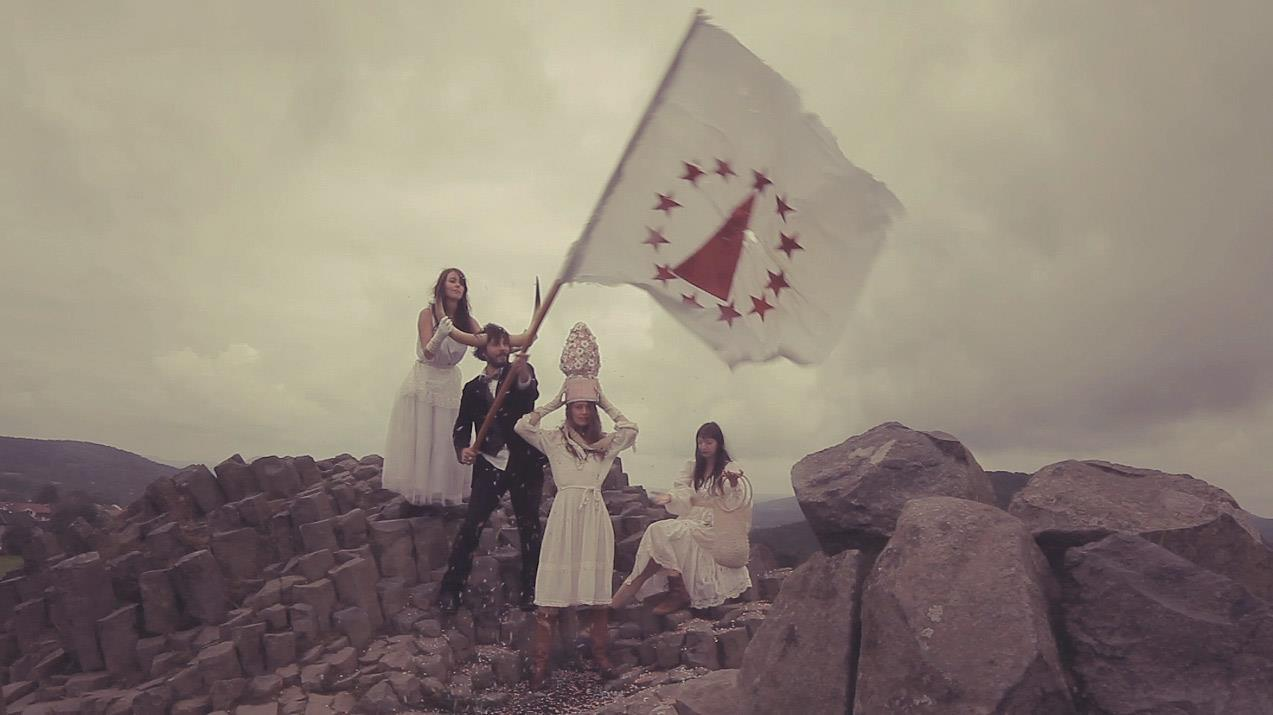
Ödland in Panska Skala, Czech Republic from Sankta Lucia album

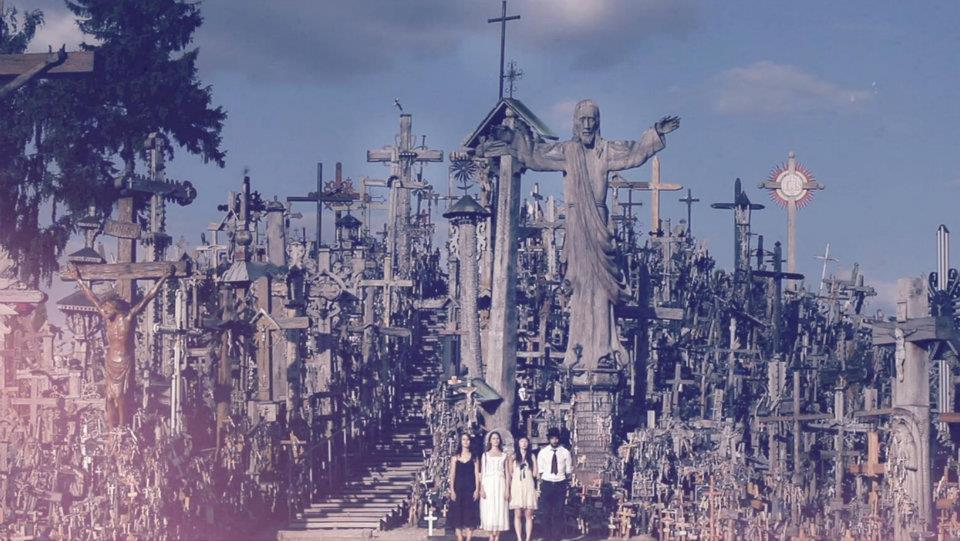
Ödland in Lithuania from Sankta Lucia

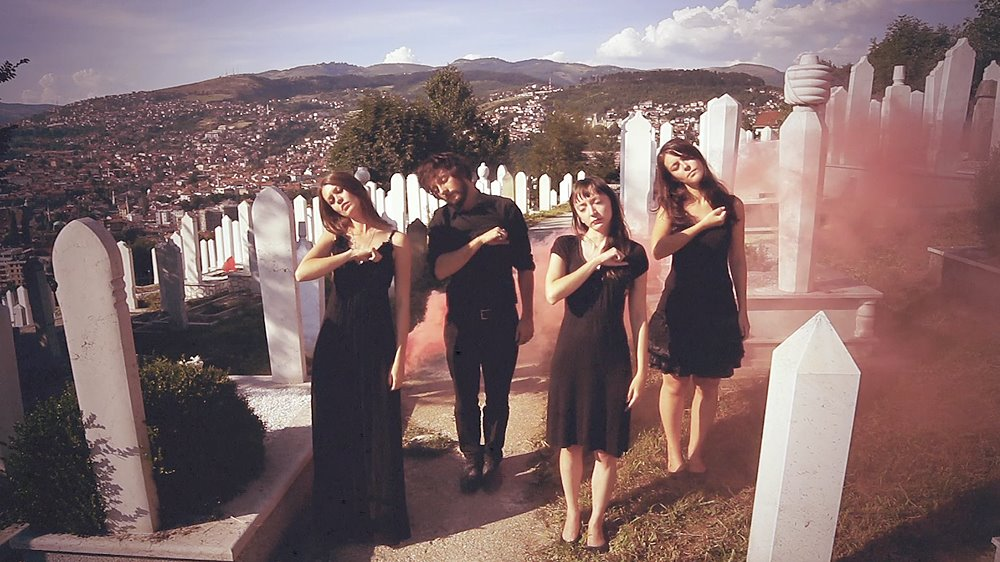
Ödland in Sarajevo from Sankta Lucia

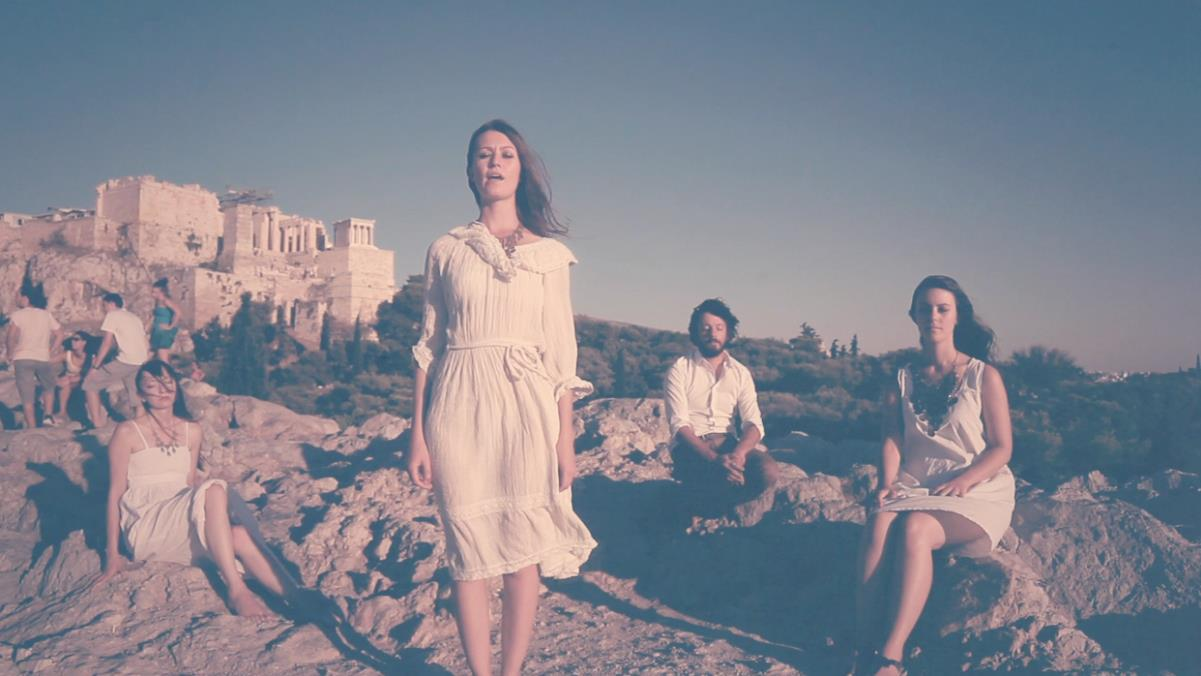
Ödland in Athens from Sankta Lucia

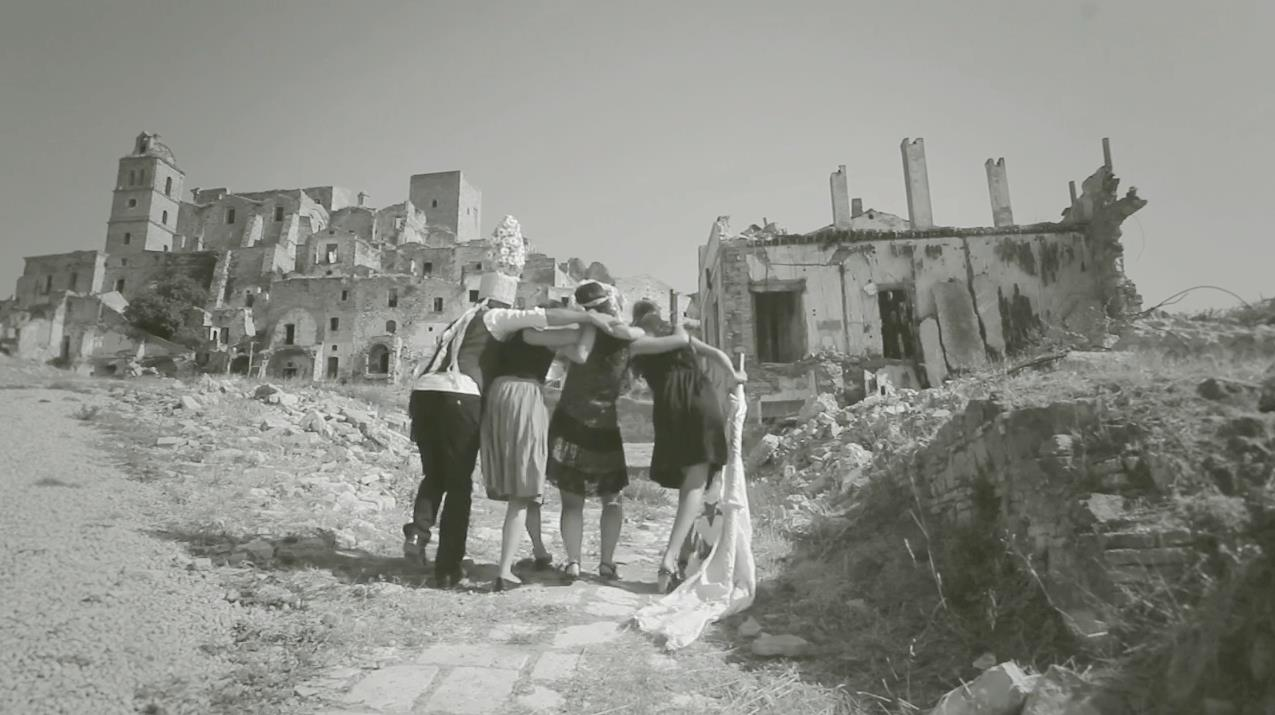
Ödland in Craco, Italy from Sankta Lucia

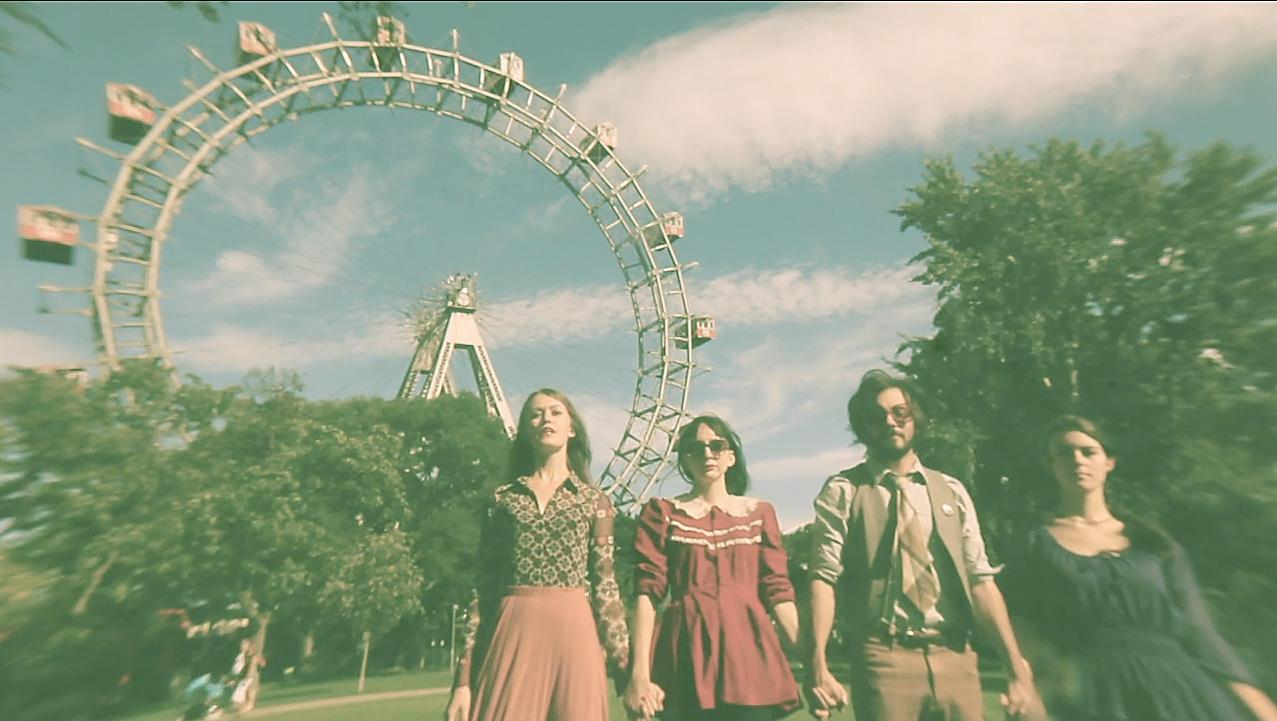
Ödland in Vienna from Sankta Lucia

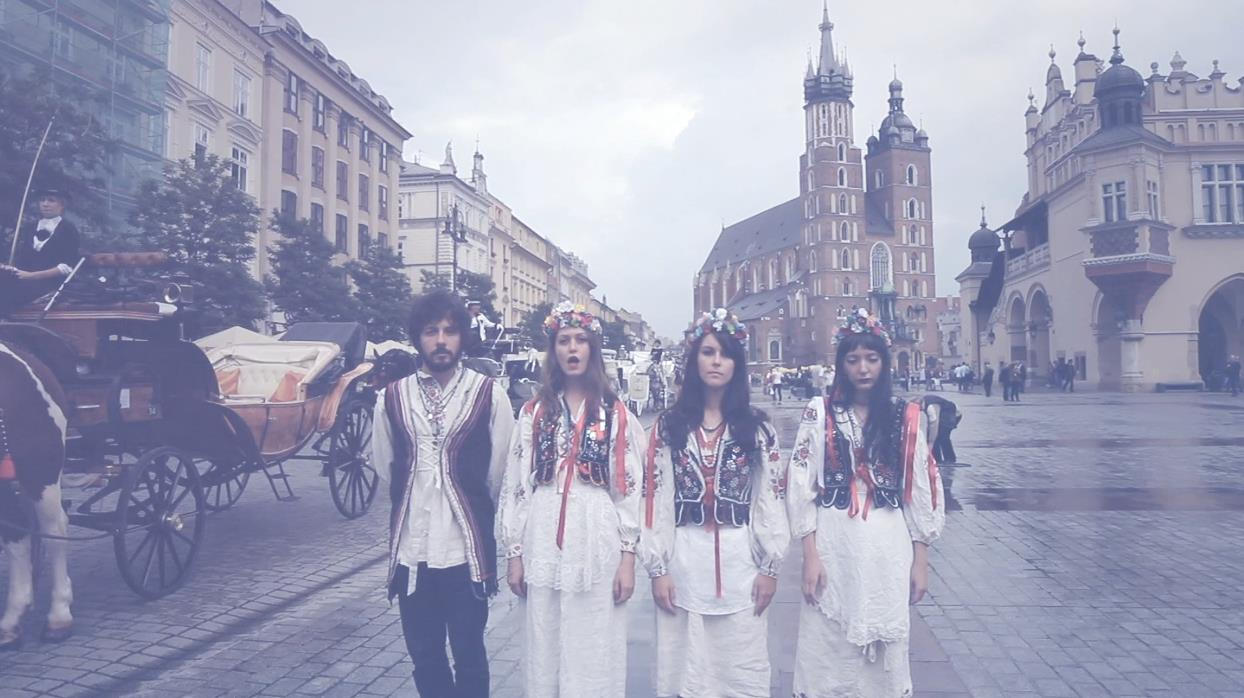
Ödland in Kraków from Sankta Lucia

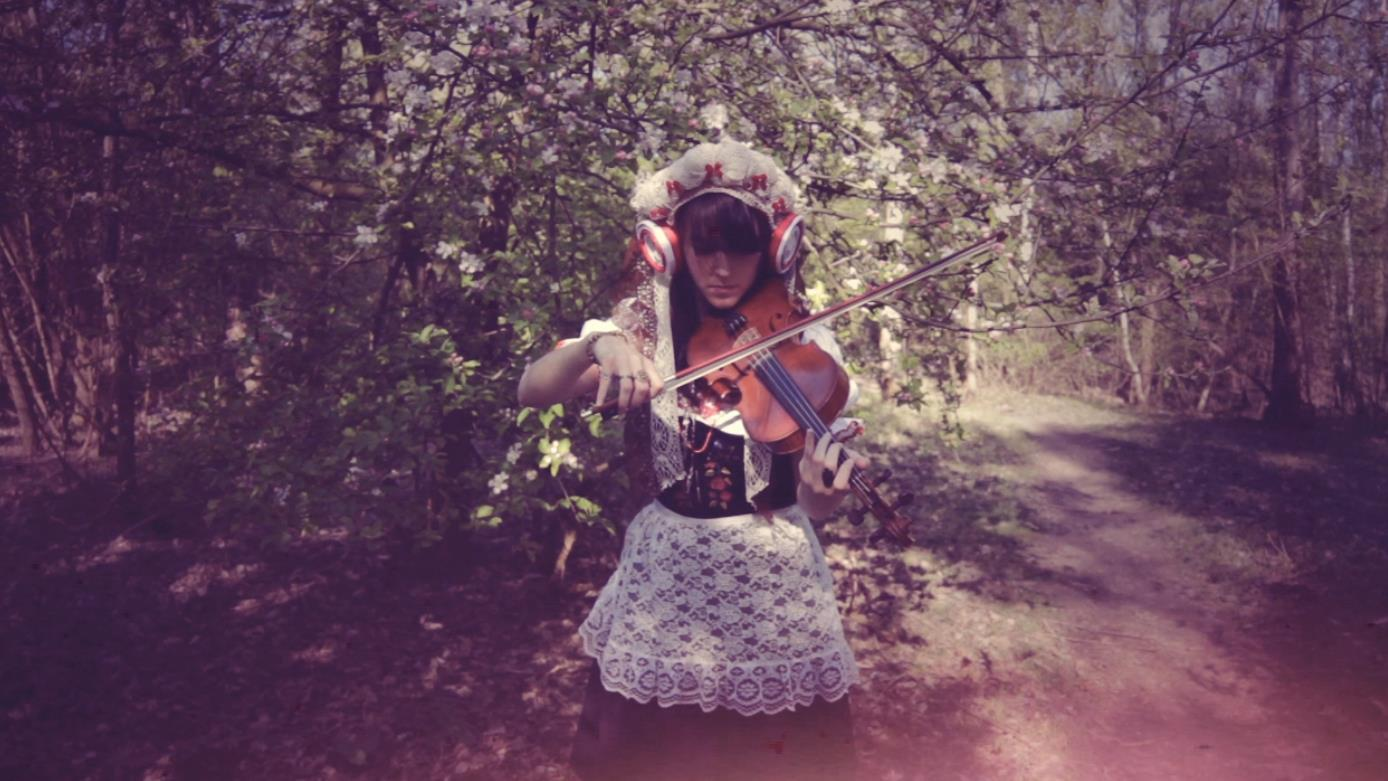
Léa Bingöllü in traditional Czech costume from Sankta Lucia

== Independent status ==
From their beginning Ödland has been totally independent. Artistically and financially autonomous, the band imagines and realises everything on their own: the music, studio recordings, mastering, art direction, graphics, video clips, production, CD distribution, promotion, and concert and tour organization. This strategy lets them keep a coherent identity throughout their work. Sometimes they appeal directly to their audience; for example, in 2011, fans were able to produce the Sankta Lucia album by themselves on the Ulule platform.

Ödland has never signed with a record label, so they produced four music albums in a DIY way. The band makes their work free (for example, their first EP The Caterpillar is available for free download), and they want to sell products with the best visual quality. In this way, Ödland explores a new kind of economic model which they feel gives them more profits and a more direct relationship with their audience. This has become easier by means of websites and social networks, and they pride themselves on not having to depend on the traditional music industry.

== Discography ==
The Caterpillar (2009)

1. "The Caterpillar"
2. "Les yeux de l'oiseau"
3. "La chanson du parasite"
4. "Sur les murs de ma chambre"
5. "Mathilde Rossignol"

Ottocento (2010)

1. "The Caterpillar"
2. "La jalousie amoureuse"
3. "La chanson du parasite"
4. "Drink Me"
5. "The Queen of Hearts"
6. "Les yeux de l’oiseau"
7. "De Vienne à Paris"
8. "De l’autre côté du miroir"
9. "Un thé chez les fous"
10. "Sur les murs de la chambre"
11. "Mathilde Rossignol"
12. "The Well"
13. "Halogénures d’argent"
14. "Train"
15. "Mon capitaine"

Zoophyte (2010)

1. "Cecidomyiidae"
2. "La floraison des bambous"

Sankta Lucia (2011)

1. "L'enlèvement d'Europe"
2. "Thirty-one wanderings"
3. "Piccioni colorati"
4. "Dummer Waltzer"
5. "Une nuit dans un train serbe"
6. "Trottoirs vermoulus"
7. "La Grèce et Moi"
8. "Les dieux sont partis"
9. "Благ несрећа"
10. "Θεσσαλονίκη"
11. "La joueuse de flûte"
12. "Sextilis fugitif"
13. "Trains possibles"
14. "Ecseri Piac"
15. "Warszawa"
16. "Østersøen"
17. "Österstund"
18. "Kiruna"
19. "Santa Lucia"

Galaktoboureko (2013)

1. Galaktoboureko
2. Ce soir je bois
3. Bouge ton Istanbul
4. Ménades et satyres
5. Orphelin
6. Un baiser dans la nuit
7. Gypsy
8. Le long du Bosphore
9. Ayışığımsın
10. Dans les faubourgs d'Athènes
11. Serait-ce un rêve ?
