= Calouste Gulbenkian Museum =

Art museum in Lisbon, Portugal

- Museu Calouste Gulbenkian
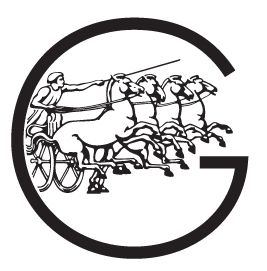

- The museum seen from the Gulbenkian Garden
- Interactive fullscreen map
- Established: 1957
- Location: Lisbon, Portugal
- Coordinates: 38°44′12″N 9°09′15″W
- Visitors: 413,000 (2024)
- Founder: Calouste Gulbenkian Foundation
- Director: António Filipe Pimentel
- Website: Official site

Lisbon's Calouste Gulbenkian Museum houses one of the world's most important private art collections. It includes works from Ancient Egypt to the early 20th century, spanning the arts of the Islamic World, China and Japan, as well as French decorative arts. It also features the jewellery of René Lalique and works by some of the most important painters of all time, such as Rembrandt, Monet, Rubens, Manet, Renoir, Degas and Turner. The Museum was founded by Armenian Portugal-based oil magnate Calouste Gulbenkian. The Gulbenkian Museum closed for renovation until July 2026, and reopened on 18 July 2026.

== Collection ==
The permanent exhibition and galleries are distributed chronologically and in geographical order to create two independent circuits within the overall tour.

The first circuit highlights Greco-Roman art from classical antiquity, as well as art from the ancient Near East and the Nile Valley. Among the artworks are ancient Egyptian, Mesopotamian, Persian, and Armenian pieces, as well as Persian art from the Islamic period.

The second circuit includes European art, with sections dedicated to the art of the book, sculpture, painting and the decorative arts, particularly 18th century French art and the work of René Lalique. In this circuit, a wide-ranging number of pieces reflect various European artistic trends from the beginning of the 11th century to the mid-20th century. The section begins with works in ivory and illuminated manuscript books, followed by a selection of 15th, 16th and 17th century sculptures and paintings. Renaissance art produced in the Netherlands, Flanders, France and Italy is on display in the next room.

French 18th century decorative art has a special place in the museum, with outstanding gold and silver objects and furniture, as well as paintings and sculptures. This section is followed by galleries exhibiting a large group of paintings by the Venetian Francesco Guardi, 18th and 19th century English paintings, and finally a superb collection of jewels and glass by René Lalique, displayed in its own room.

Some of the works in the collection were bought during the Soviet sale of Hermitage paintings. Of about 6000 items in the museum's collections, a selection of around 1000 is on permanent exhibition. Gulbenkian's motto was "only the best"; hence the museum has masterpieces by western European artists such as Domenico Ghirlandaio, Rubens, Rembrandt, Rodin, Carpeaux, Houdon, Renoir, Dierick Bouts, Vittore Carpaccio, Cima da Conegliano, Van Dyck, Corot, Degas, Nattier, George Romney, Stefan Lochner, Maurice-Quentin de La Tour, Édouard Manet, Henri Fantin-Latour, Claude Monet, Jean-François Millet, Sir Edward Burne-Jones, Thomas Gainsborough, Joseph Mallord William Turner, Jean-Honoré Fragonard, Giovanni Battista Moroni, Frans Hals, Ruisdael, Boucher, Largillière, Andrea della Robbia, Pisanello, Jean-Baptiste Pigalle, Antonio Rossellino, André-Charles Boulle, Charles Cressent, Oeben, Riesener, Antoine-Sébastien Durand, Charles Spire, Jean Deforges, François-Thomas Germain.

Gulbenkian's Centro de Arte Moderna (CAM) also actively commissions and collects works to add to its holdings, today numbering 12,000 pieces.

== History ==
Vasco Maria Eugénio de Almeida acquired part of the Parque de Santa Gertrudes, in April 1957, for the construction of the Foundation buildings and public/private park. Two years later, a competition was launched for a project to construct the organization's headquarters. It was eventually won by the team that included architects Alberto J. Pessoa, Pedro Cid and Ruy Jervis d'Athouguia (1917-2006), in addition to the landscaping architects António Viana Barreto and Gonçalo Ribeiro Telles, who were responsible for designing the park surrounding the building. Later, Francisco Caetano Keil do Amaral was added to the team, as a consultant, and Frederico Henrique George joined the team working on the building.

In December 1961, the anterior project of the park was begun, while work on the earthworks and retaining walls beginning the following year. A sculpture panel was installed in the headquarters building by architect Artur Rosa in 1962. By 1967, the interior finishing were adjudicated, with the project concluded in 1968. On 2 October 1969, the buildings and gardens were inaugurated. The 12th International Federation of Landscaping Architects Congress was held in September 1970 on the grounds of the Gulbenkian Foundation. In 1975, the property was distinguished with the Valmor Prize.

After 21 years of acquisitions, more than three years of construction and a lively controversy generated by conservationists, Gulbenkian's Centro de Arte Moderna (CAM) was opened in 1983 as Portugal's first museum of modern art. In 2024, CAM re-opened after a €58 million redevelopment.

== Architecture ==
The museum was designed as a showcase for the collection, which was relatively unique for an art museum at a time when most museums were housed in buildings originally built for other purposes. The landscaping and museum building interact, with views into woods and wetlands punctuating the artwork on display, while woodland paths offer views of the dramatic building, the edges of which include terraces and water features that blur the border between built and natural environment. The grouped buildings are set within a park bordered by the Avenida de Berna (north), Avenida António Augusto de Aguiar (west), Rua Marquês de Sá da Bandeira (east) and the Centro de Arte Moderna (south).

The shape of the museum and headquarters is relatively simple, with T-shaped wings, each with an entrance. The massive volume, long and horizontal was used for administration, services and as auditoriums, off of the main, single entry space. It is in this entrance that the panel Começar, by Almada Negreiros is situated.

Designed by the British architect Leslie Martin, CAM's original building has been a three-story structure with a vast single-room gallery consisting of interconnecting floors; movable panels provide for maximum flexibility in arranging exhibits. The 2024 redevelopment of CAM was carried out by Kengo Kuma and Associates. The most prominent addition is a 100m-long entrance canopy clad in dark planks of ash with handmade white tiles on top, based on the Japanese engawa. The architects also moved the main entrance of the museum from north to south.

== Directors ==
- 2015–2020: Penelope Curtis
- 2020–present: António Filipe Pimentel
- In 2026, Xavier Salomon succeeded António Filipe Pimentel as director.

== Gallery ==
Bronze sarcophagus with a cat and her kittens, from Egypt's Twenty-sixth Dynasty

Islamic art gallery with a carpet displayed at the centre

Assyrian relief with a winged figure, from the palace of Ashurnasirpal II at Nimrud

İznik tile panel with flowering Prunus trees

Chinese art gallery with display cases beside the garden-facing windows

Chinese Coromandel lacquer screen with scenes of palace life

Pair of porcelain guardian lions from the Qing dynasty

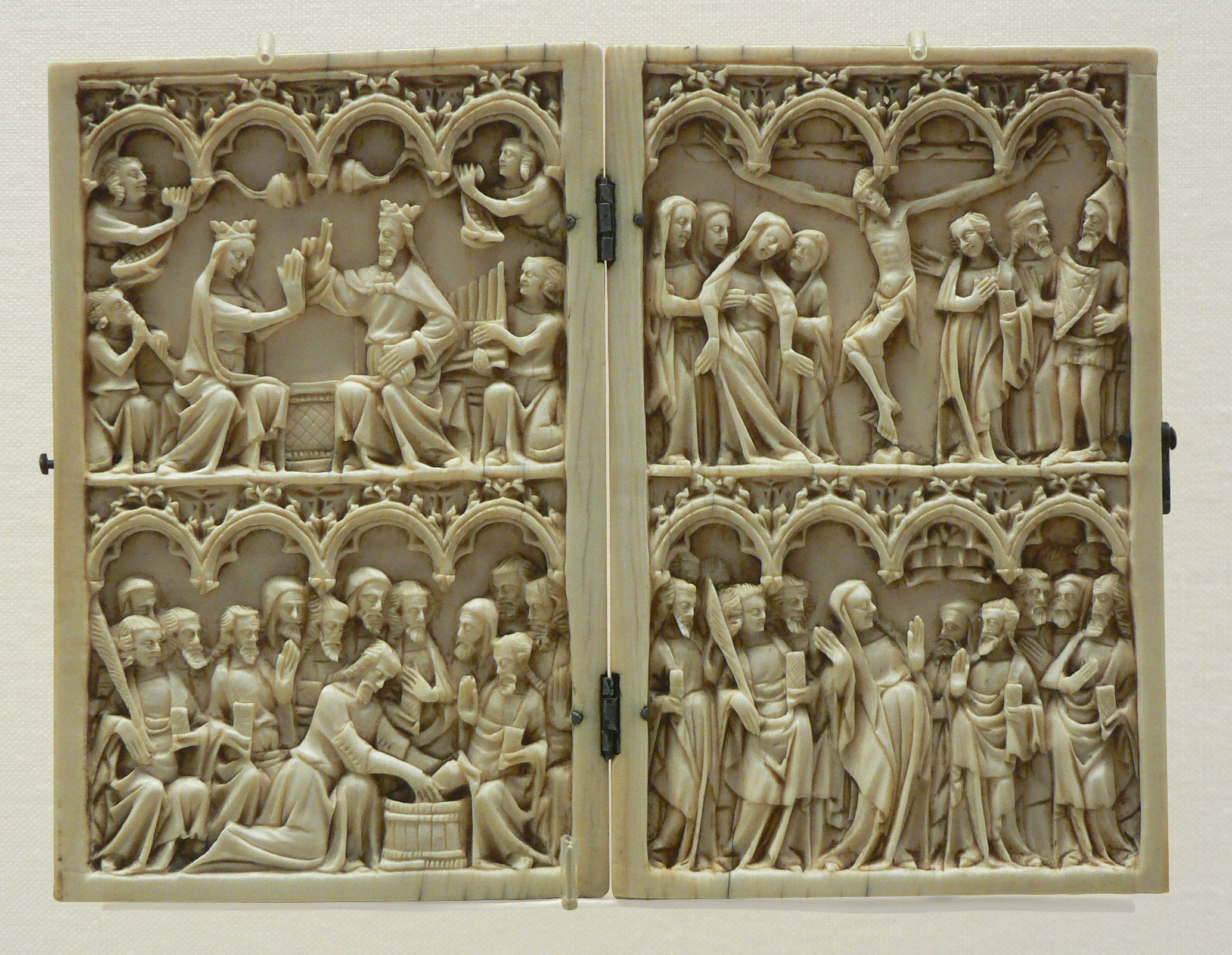
Fourteenth-century French ivory diptych with scenes from the life of Christ

Tapestry with figures in a garden

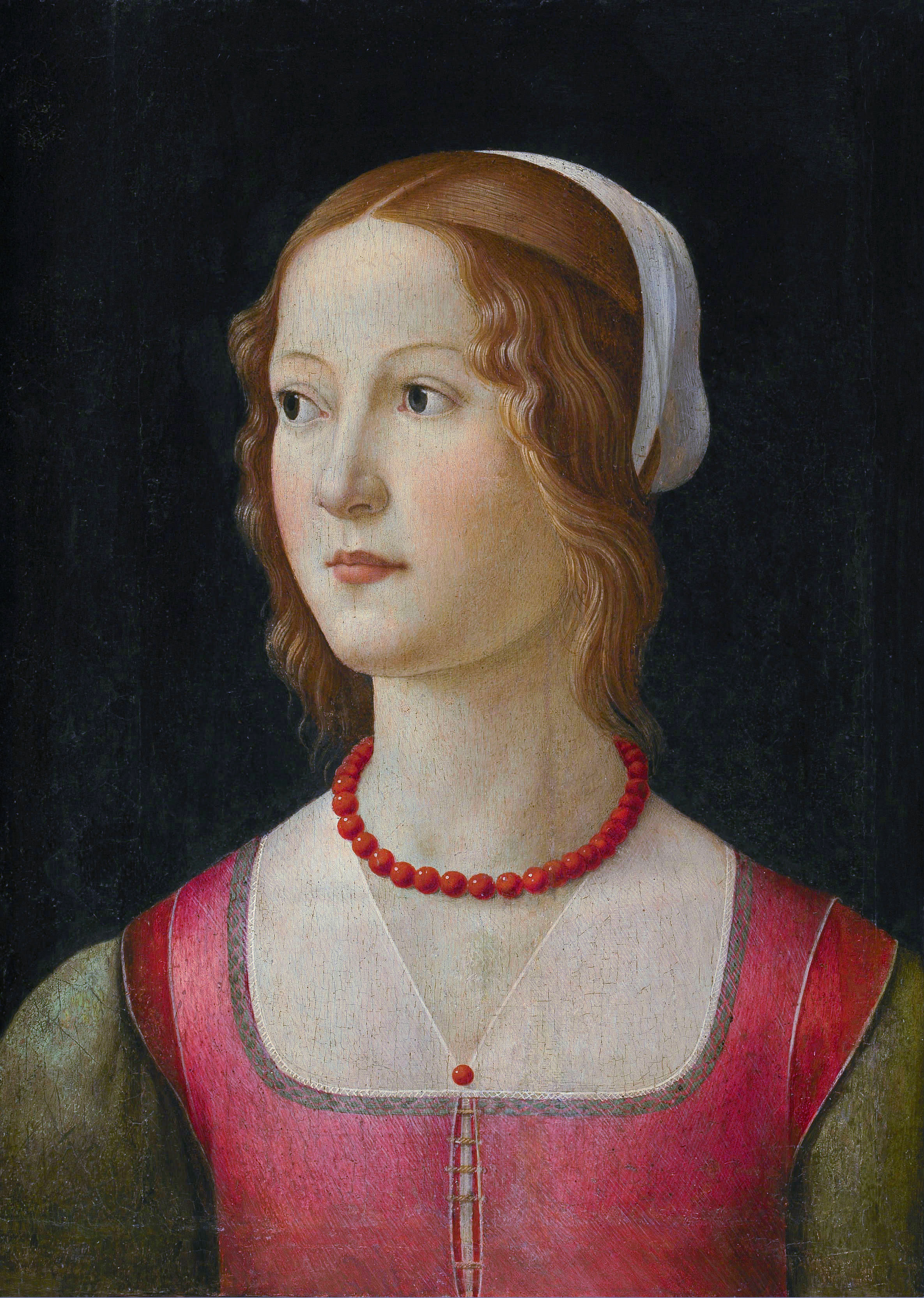
Portrait of a Young Woman, by Domenico Ghirlandaio

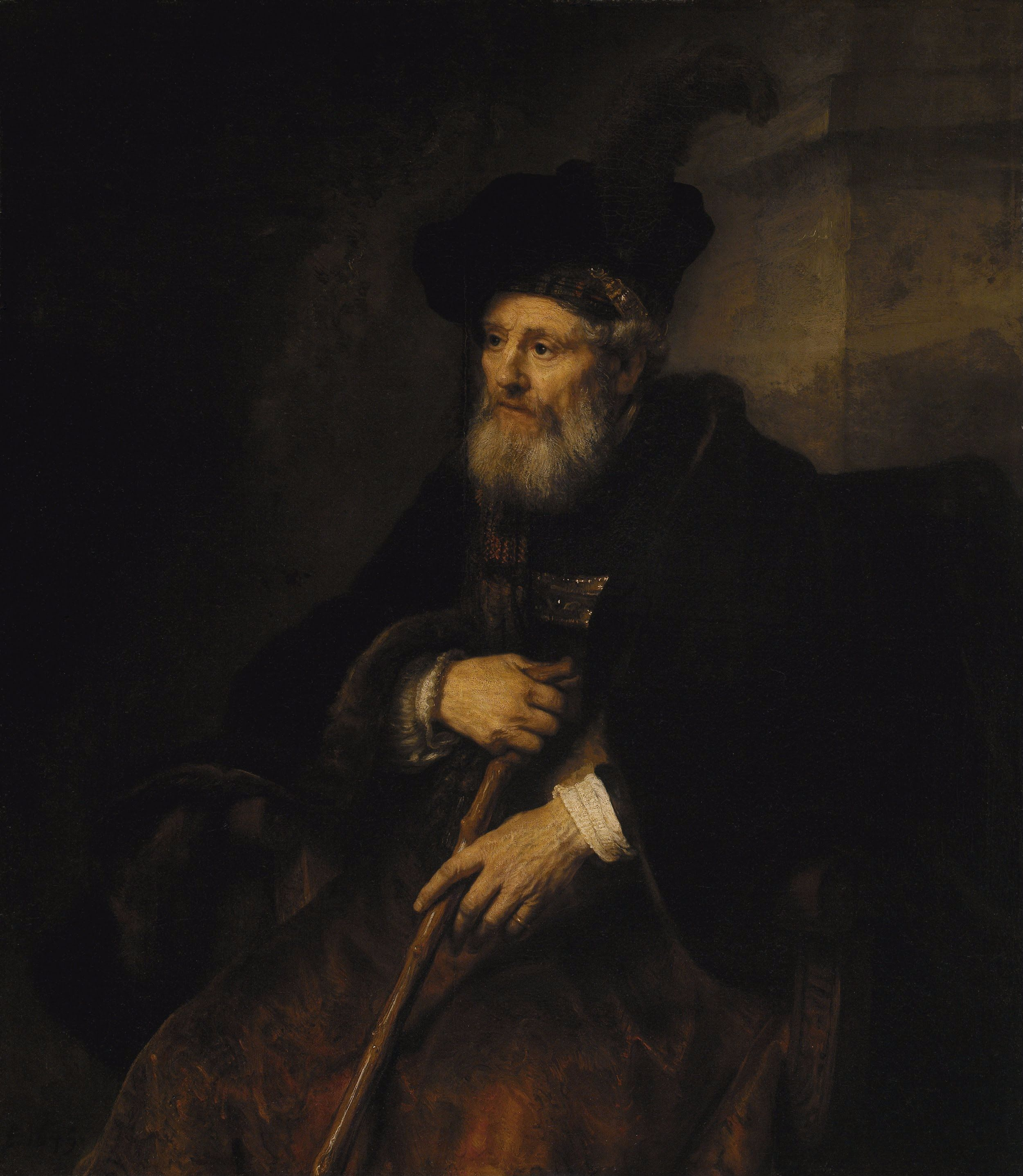
Portrait of an Old Man, by Rembrandt

French decorative arts display with a commode, armchairs and tapestries

Diana, by Jean-Antoine Houdon, beside a window overlooking the garden

View of a Venetian canal, by Francesco Guardi, in a gilt frame

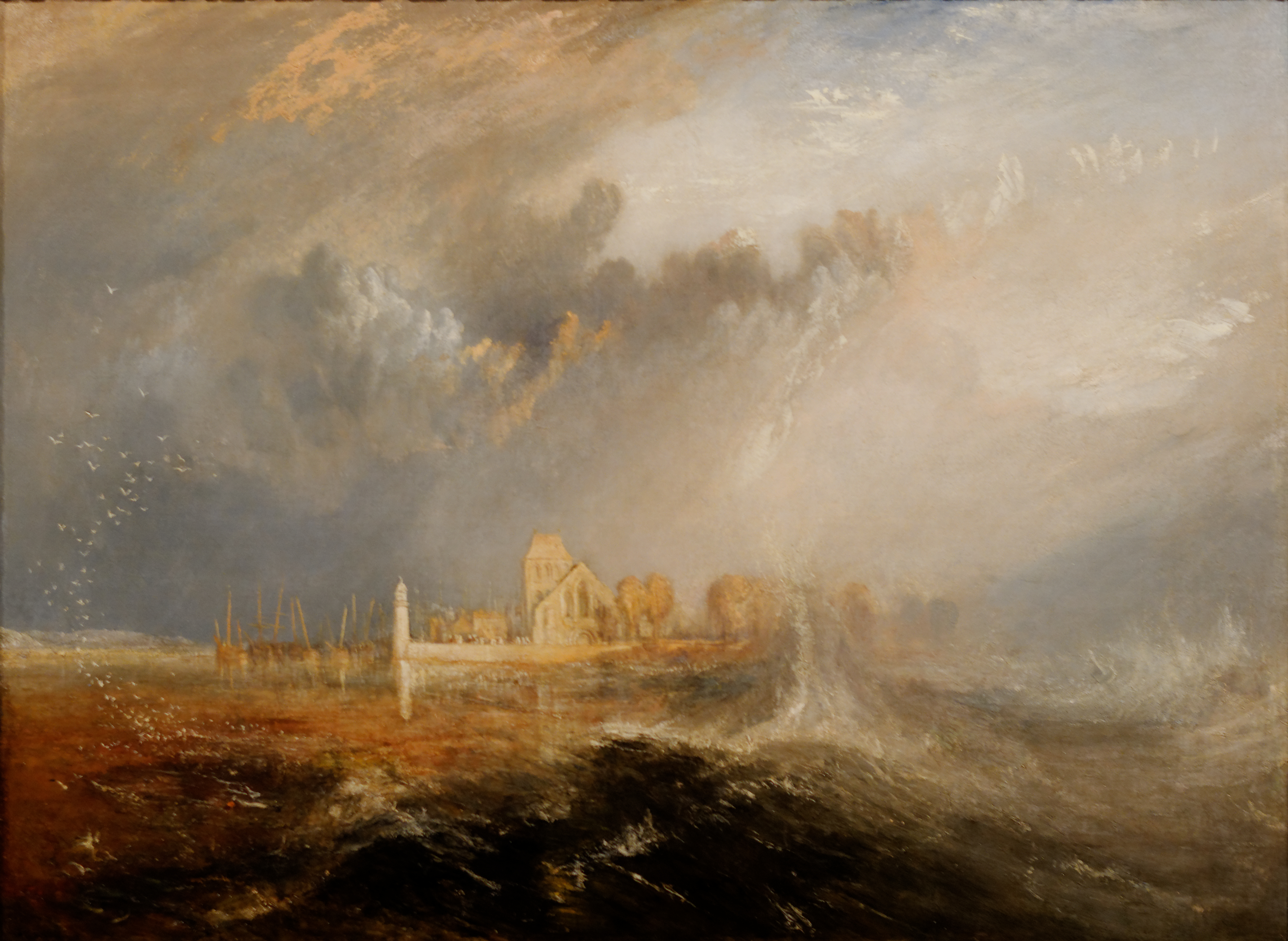
Quillebeuf, Mouth of the Seine, by J. M. W. Turner

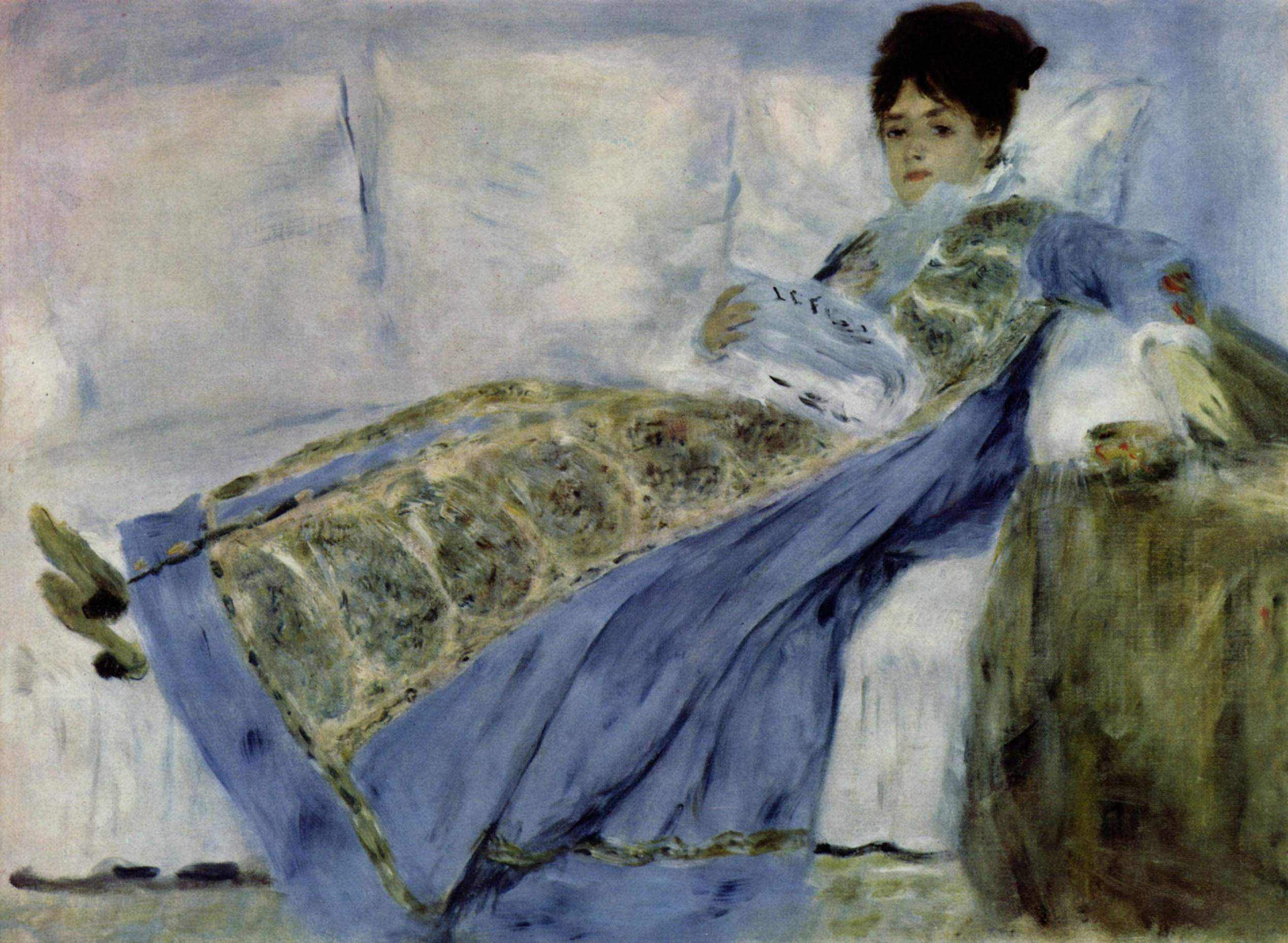
Portrait of Camille Monet, by Pierre-Auguste Renoir

Cockerel diadem, by René Lalique

The Spring or Homage to Jean Goujon, by Alfred-Auguste Janniot

== See also ==
- Calouste Gulbenkian Foundation
- Centro de Arte Moderna Gulbenkian
