= Adoration of the Magi (Sequeira) =

Painting by Domingos Sequeira

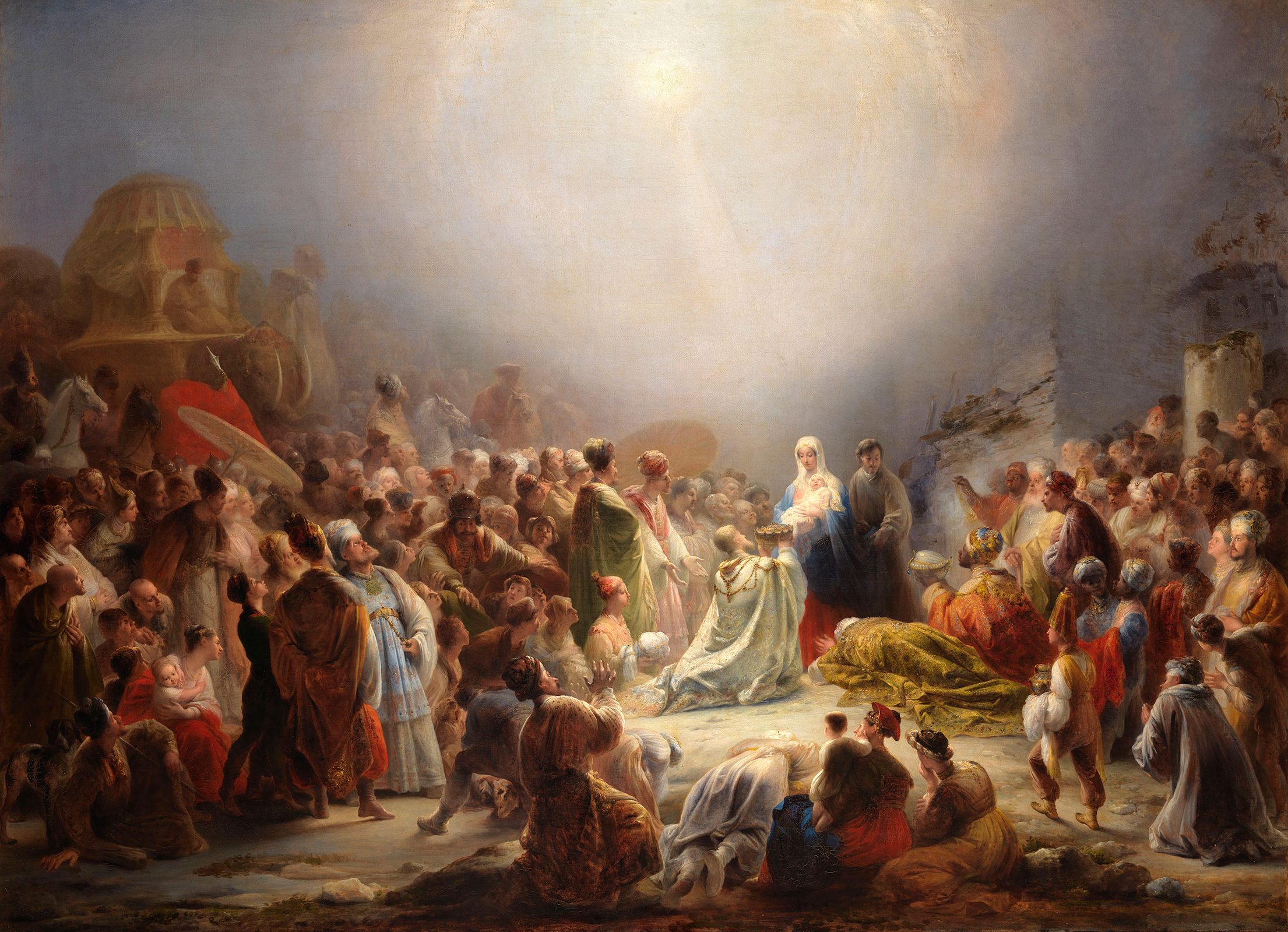
- Artist: Domingos Sequeira
- Year: 1828
- Medium: Oil on canvas
- Subject: Adoration of the Magi
- Dimensions: 100 cm × 140 cm (39 in × 55 in)
- Location: National Museum of Ancient Art, Lisbon

The Adoration of the Magi is a painting by Portuguese artist Domingos Sequeira, dated to 1828. It shows the common subject in the Nativity art of the visit by the Three Kings to the infant Jesus, here given a grand theatrical treatment by including their spectacular and exotic retinues.

The Adoration is part of the four-part Palmela Series, bought in 1845 by Pedro de Sousa Holstein, 1st Duke of Palmela from Sequeira's daughter, along with Descent from the Cross, Ascension, and the unfinished Last Judgment. The series has been called, by art critic José-Augusto França, Sequeira's "aesthetic and spiritual testament".

It has been in the National Museum of Ancient Art in Lisbon since 2016, when its acquisition was the object of a successful and much-publicised crowdfunding campaign, the first of its kind in the country.

== Description ==
The Adoration is ethereally and dramatically illuminated by the Star of Bethlehem, reminiscent of the style of Rembrandt (a comparison already made by Count Raczynski in 1847), and also Tiepolo and probably Turner, in the opinion of José-Augusto França. The star is depicted as a luminous white circle of light up in the sky, from which seeps a faint luminescence that lights up the characters; a more distinct diagonal ray of light shines directly onto Jesus and Mary in the centre of the composition. Saint Joseph, not as brightly lit as the Virgin, stands beside her and holds her blue mantle.

The Magi are before the Holy Family; two, Melchior and Balthazar, kneel holding up the gifts of gold and myrrh in ornate and bejewelled boxes, the other, Caspar, is prostrate and behind him stands a page holding the gift of frankincense. Nearby, a man stands swinging a thurible.

Not only the Magi, but the crowd of around 150 figures that surround them are dressed in elaborate exotic robes, turbans and caps resembling fezzes. Some of them bear prominent status symbols, such as richly decorated cloaks and headgear, processional canopies, horses with elaborate reins and harnesses, and one is carried inside an elaborate carriage on the back of an elephant. Immediately behind the Magi, there are groups of young pages that hold their cloaks and headgear. A small group of dignitaries to the left seems to be discussing the nature of the light above (possibly astronomers); a harried soldier shoves a group of young men out of the way; a shepherd on the foreground seems to be preparing to immolate a sheep. There also seem to be subtle visual references to the prophecy of Isaiah: the rubble of the ruined Jerusalem from Isa. 60:1, the women carrying lap children from Isa. 60:4 (alternatively, a reference to the Massacre of the Innocents), the camels from Isa. 60:6.

The scene is framed by the crowd, the Romantic vague suggestion of ruins and a misty pale sky, with a dramatic horizon painted as an open 'V' shape, guiding the view towards the focal point of the composition: Jesus on Mary's arms.

== History ==
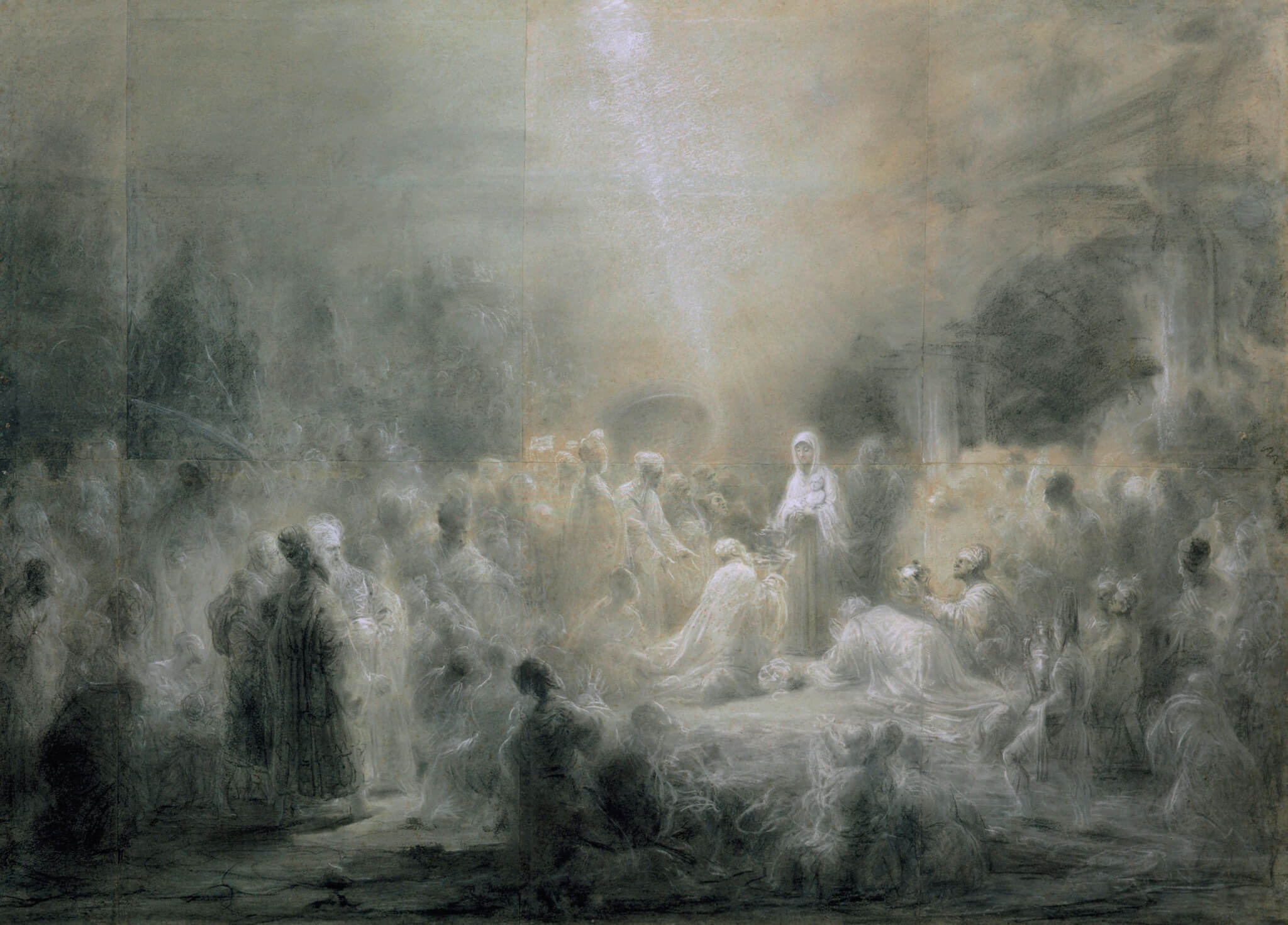
Study for the Adoration of the Magi. National Museum of Ancient Art, Lisbon

The painting was completed in Castel Gandolfo, near Rome, in the summer of 1828, during a very particular time in the author's life. Domingos Sequeira had been exiled from his country since 1823, following the Vilafrancada uprising and the fall of the Vintist movement with which he had collaborated. Sequeira had recently returned to Italy, where he had studied and worked until 1795. He rejoined the Accademia di San Luca, and became, in 1829, a founding member of the Società degli Amatori e Cultori dei Belle Arti. When the Società held its first exhibition in the rooms of the Campidoglio in 1830, Sequeira sends his Adoration of the Magi, along with the Descent from the Cross that preceded it by a year, to great critical acclaim. According to Sequeira's son-in-law João Pedro de Carvalho e Brito, in a letter addressed in 1846 to the Marquis of Lavradio, Sequeira "did not paint [the Palmela Series] by commission, but did so motu proprio, to show the artists of Rome, his old friends, the manner by which one should paint." For this reason, Sequeira scholar Alexandra Markl has called the Adoration of the Magi "a veritable manifest on Sequeira's thoughts on the path the art of painting ought to follow in his time".

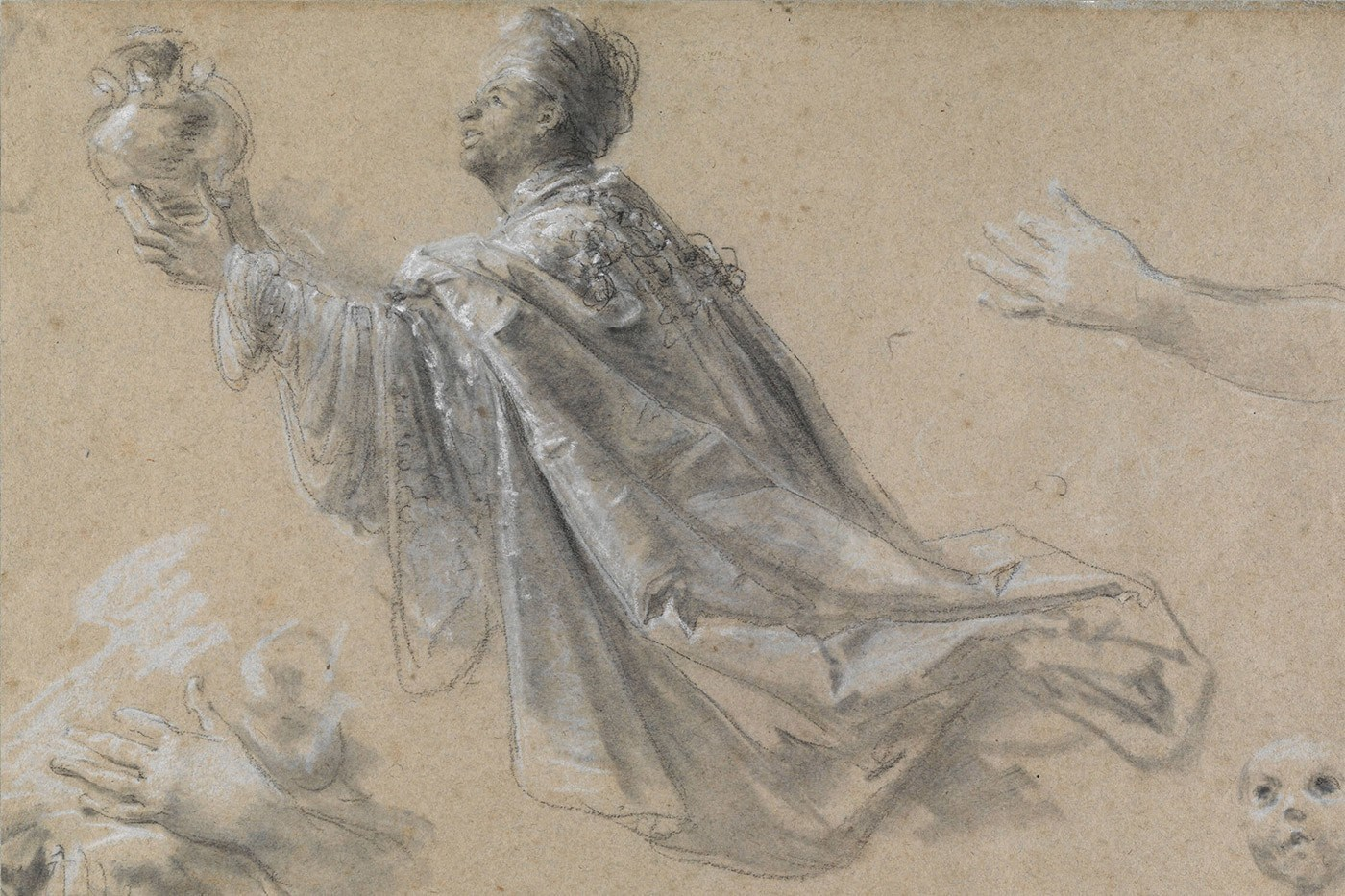
A study for the figure of Balthazar, offering myrrh

To prepare the work, Sequeira made a main preparatory study, in charcoal and white chalk, on the same scale as the final painting. Then, he made individual, detailed sketches of some of the figures, to hone postures, gestures, and facial expressions: there are more than twenty-five such sketches. These are all part of the collections of the National Museum of Ancient Art; they were purchased for the Royal Academy of Fine Arts, an institutional ancestor of the museum, in 1878, following the death of the Marquis of Sousa Holstein. José-Augusto França compares the skill Sequeira shows in these sketches as a draftsman to that of Tintoretto.

The work remained with the descendants of Pedro de Sousa Holstein, 1st Duke of Palmela, who bought it in 1845 from Sequeira's daughter Mariana Benedita, along with the four other paintings that comprise the Palmela Series, until 2016. A public fundraising campaign called "Vamos pôr o Sequeira no Lugar Certo" (Let's put the Sequeira in the right place), launched in October 2015, counted with the small contributions of thousands of private citizens, institutions, companies, schools, local governments, and even President Rebelo de Sousa; the largest contribution, of 200 thousand euros, was made by the Aga Khan Foundation in the person of Prince Amyn Aga Khan. The campaign raised more than 745 thousand euros, surpassing the 600 thousand the owners asked for — the leftover revenue was set aside to buy another painting, in 2018: a 15th-century Annunciation by Álvaro Pires de Évora, sold in a Sotheby's auction in New York.

The painting then underwent restoration by the Museum's Department for Conservation and Restoration, for two months: even though it was in very good state of preservation, restorers removed applications of old oxidised varnish that gave the painting a yellowish hue and concealed some detail, as well as minor overpainting. The restoration work revealed new information about the painting, namely, that Sequeira had used his own fingerprints to give texture to the mantles of the Magi, and that the artist made very little alteration to the compositions seen in the underdrawing.

The painting was unveiled on 14 July 2016, on the same day as the newly renovated gallery of 12th to 19th-century Portuguese painting and sculpture.
