= António Filipe Pimentel =

PhD António Filipe Pimentel
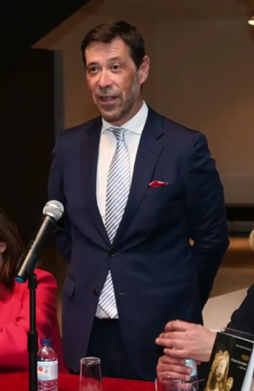
- Born: 1959-12-05
- Education: The University of Coimbra
- Occupation: Art historian

António Manuel Filipe Rocha Pimentel (born 5 December 1959 in São Pedro de Alva, Penacova) is a Portuguese academic and art historian currently the director of the Calouste Gulbenkian Museum in Lisbon, Portugal.

He served as director of the Museu Nacional de Arte Antiga from March 2010 until June 2019. Prior to this he was the director of the Museu Grão Vasco, in Viseu. Between 2007 and 2009 he was Dean of the University of Coimbra, responsible for the field of Heritage. Between 2020 and 2022 he sat on the board of directors for the World Monuments Fund Portugal.

== Career ==
=== Academic ===
Graduating in history (with a specialization in History of Art) from the Faculty of Arts of the University of Coimbra, in 1986, he then completed his master's degree in Cultural and Political History of the Modern Age in 1991. In 2003 he completed his doctorate in History of Art. He is a permanent lecturer at the Faculty of Arts of the University of Coimbra.

An expert in baroque art and historic and artistic heritage, he was awarded the Gulbenkian History of Art Prize in 1991. A corresponding member of both the National Academy of Fine Arts and the Naval Academy, and a member of the Scientific Society of the Portuguese Catholic University, he regularly works with national and international scientific institutions and has published around three hundred titles, in Portugal, Spain, France, Italy, UK, Belgium, Germany, Poland, Slovakia, Slovenia, and Brazil.

As Dean of the University of Coimbra, he was the scientific coordinator for the university's application for its historical and cultural complex to be given UNESCO World Heritage status.

=== Museu Nacional de Arte Antiga ===
As director of the Museu Nacional de Arte Antiga, António Filipe Pimentel became known for running several successful and innovative communications campaigns. Initiatives such as the project Coming Out. Bringing the Museum onto the streets, which, in 2015, took to the historical neighborhoods of Lisbon replicas of works from its collections of Portuguese and European paintings, helped promote the institution at the national and international level.

In 2015–2016, he organized unprecedented fundraising and crowd-sourcing campaign - Let's Put the Sequeira in its Rightful Place. The campaign mobilized 171 organizations and fifteen thousand individuals to make donations, resulting in the acquisition of the painting A Adoração dos Magos (The Adoration of the Magi, 1828) by Domingos Sequeira.

With the remaining funds from this highly successful campaign, the museum was also able to acquire the paintings Retrato de D. João V e a Batalha do Cabo Matapão (Portrait of King John V and the Battle of Cape Matapan, 1717) by Domenico Duprà in 2016, and A Anunciação (The Annunciation, c. 1430) by Álvaro Pires de Évora in 2018.

Despite initially being appointed by the Minister of Culture Gabriela Canavilhas for his ‘administrative spirit,’ his work at the Museu Nacional de Arte Antiga, which he describes as a quiet revolution,’ broadly changed the general perception of the institution, modernizing it and making it more international, based on a growing network of partnerships, both Portuguese and foreign. The increased dynamism of an intensive and creative program, with the continual organization and presentation of significant exhibitions that bore his stamp (and which he described, in an interview, as ‘moments of voluptuousness’) resulted in a sustained increase in visitor numbers, achieving growth of nearly 100% during his leadership.

Under his direction, the museum initiated a systematic campaign of renovation that changed the public's attitude towards the institution, at the same time as committing to the enhancement of its collections and the development of scientific research.

Having insisted on the need to change the Museum's management model and give it administrative and financial autonomy, as well as physically extending it. He disagreed with ministerial policy for the sector regarding the terms of the new statute for the autonomous management of museums, monuments, and palaces, this led to his reluctance to remain once his service commission had ended, leading him to return to his university career.

On leaving, he published the book MNAA 2010-2019. Para a História do Museu Nacional de Arte Antiga (MNAA 2010-2019). For the History of the National Museum of Ancient Art), a compilation of texts that summarised his thoughts on the institution.

In 2016, he was one of 17 international figures working in culture and the arts selected to meet Pope Francis, as part of an initiative with the title ‘Arte luce di Dio,’ and, for the occasion, he gave a speech to the Italian Senate.

==== Artworks purchased thanks to the Let's Put the Sequeira in its Rightful Place funding campaign ====
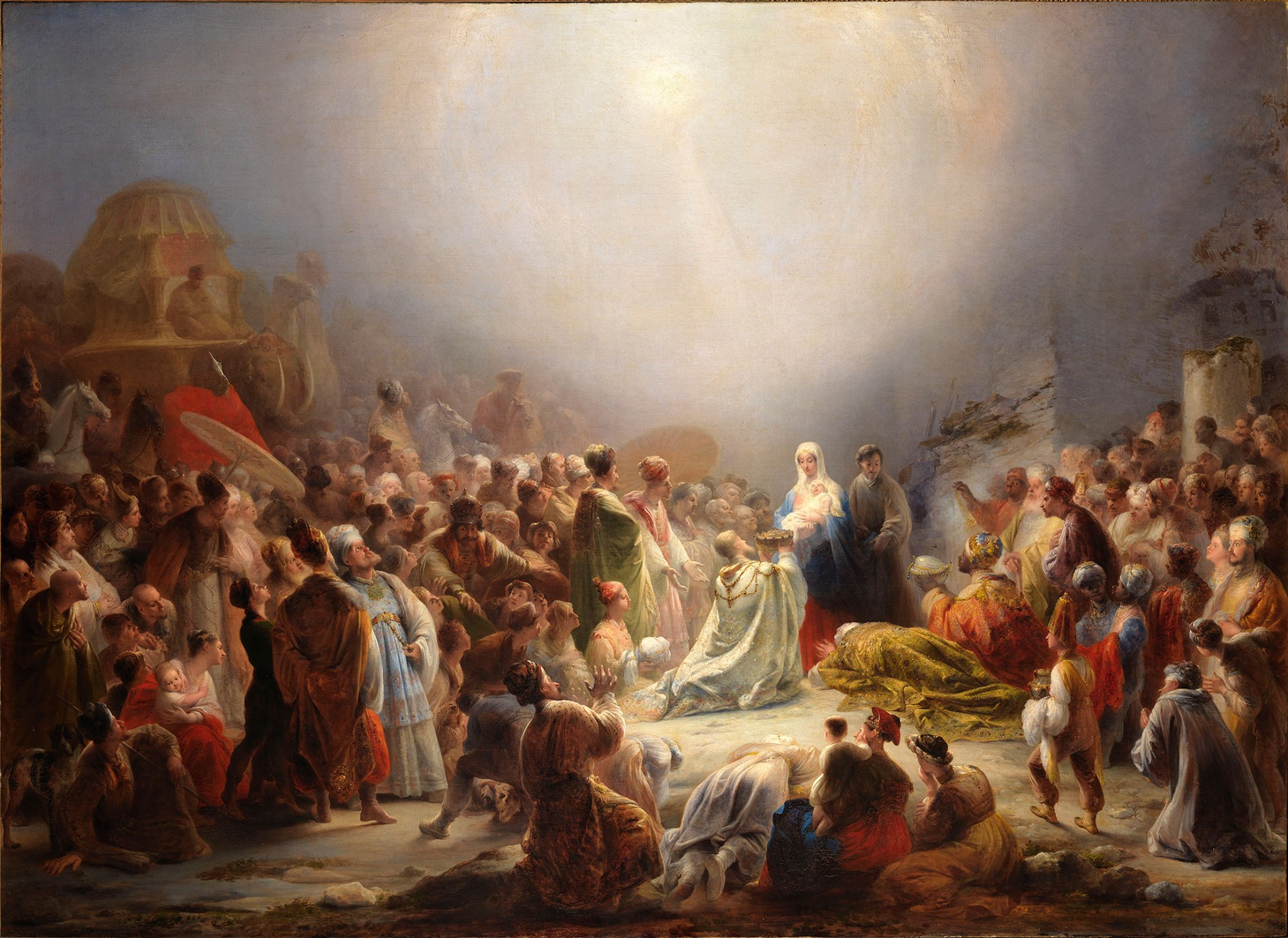
Domingos Sequeira, The Adoration of the Magi, 1828

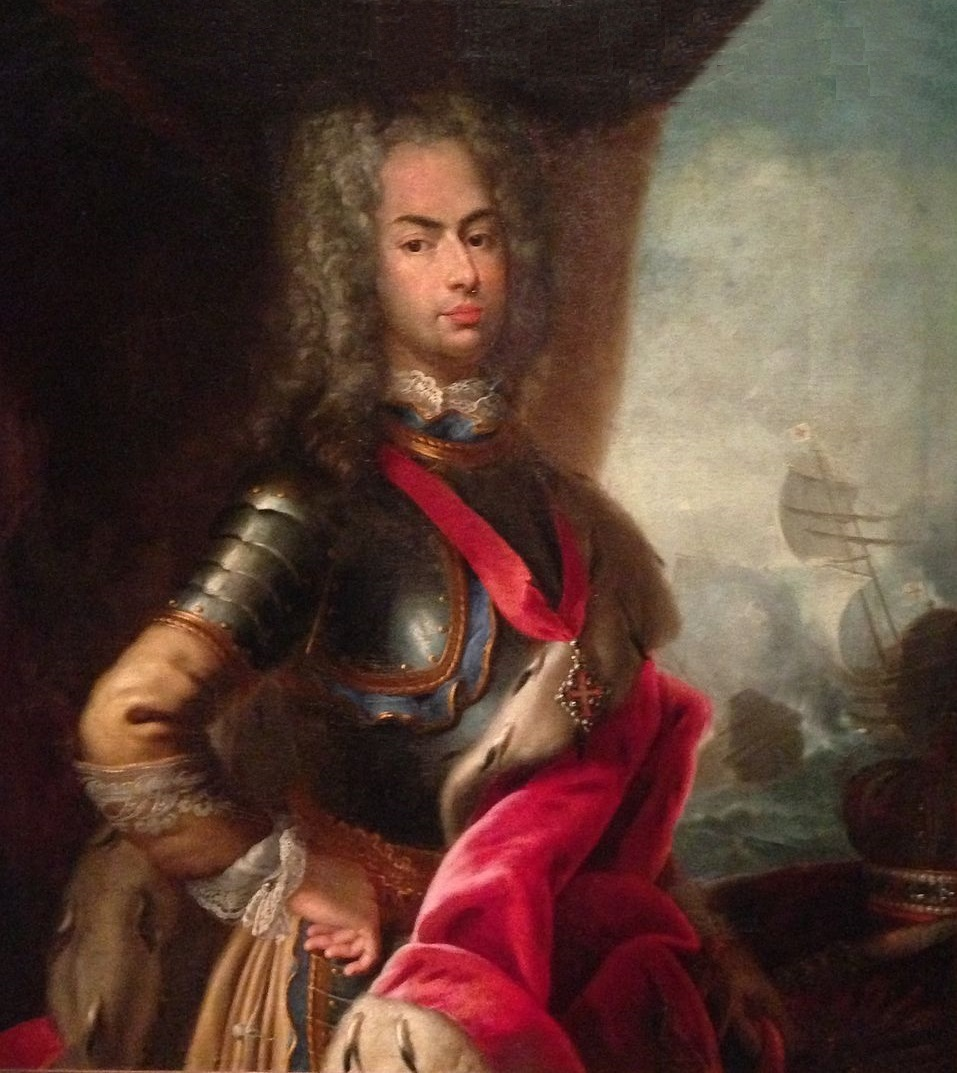
Domenico Duprá, Portrait of King John V and the Battle of Cape Matapan, 1717

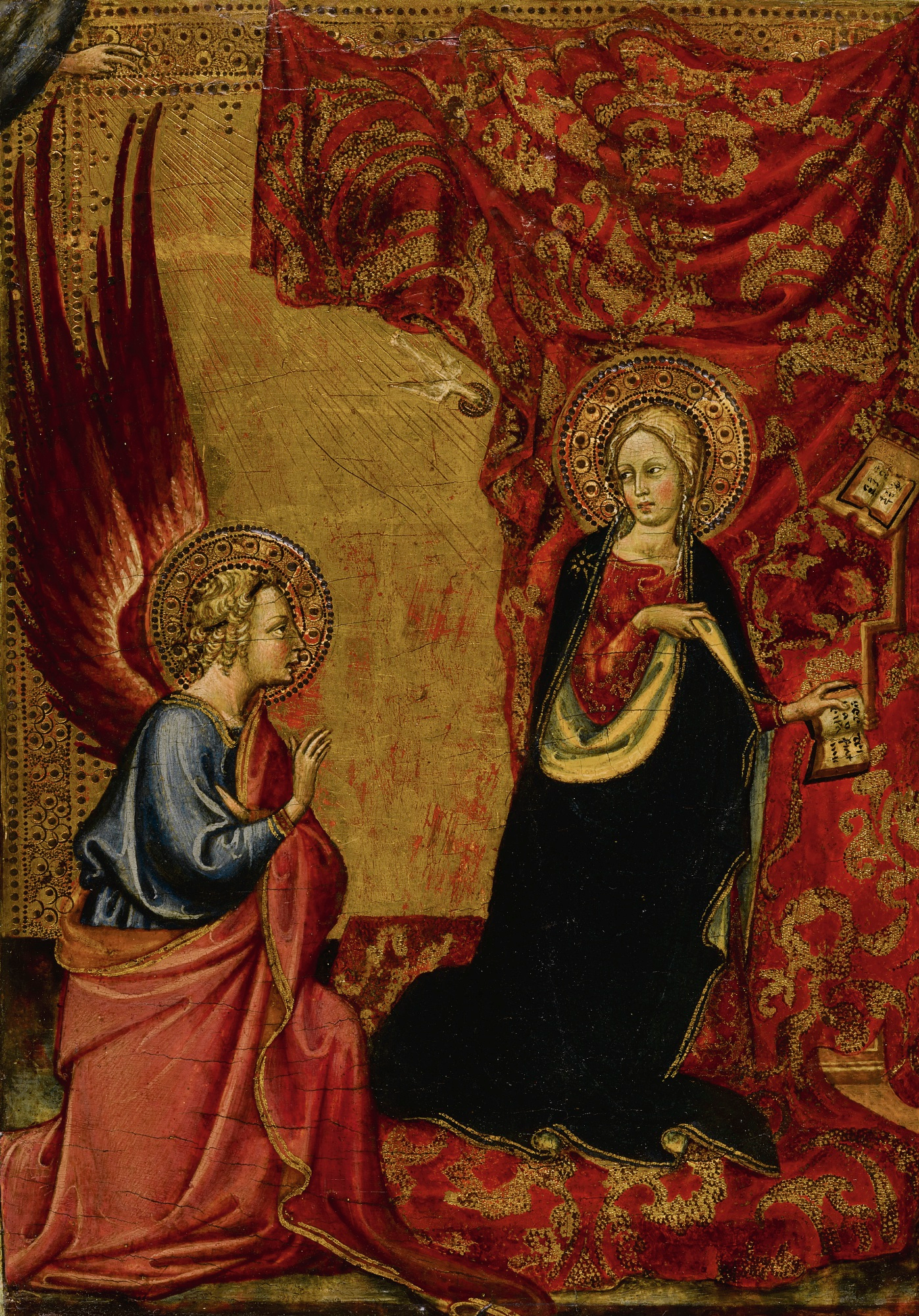
Álvaro Pires de Évora,The Annunciation, c. 1430

== Selected publications ==
- The Dictionary of Art. London: Macmillan Publishers Limited, 1996.
- Histoire de L'Art, peinture, sculpture, architecture. Paris: Hachette Éducation (25ª ed., 2018), in collaboration with Jean-François FAVRE, Dietrich GRUNEWALD e Jacek DEBICKI; [ Stuttgart: 1996]; [Ljubljana: 1998]; [Bratislava: 1998]; [Warsaw; 1998]; [Coimbra: 2010].
- “Um Olhar Perspicaz: Robert Smith e o Monumento de Mafra”, Robert C. Smith: an investigação na História da Arte/Research in History of Art. Lisbon: Calouste Gulbenkian Foundation, 2000.
- “D. João V e a festa devota: do espectáculo da política à política do espectáculo”, Arte Efémera em Portugal. Lisbon: Calouste Gulbenkian Foundation, 2000.
- “Uma jóia em forma de templo: a Capela de São João Baptista”, Oceanos, nº 43, “A ourivesaria luso-brasileira do ciclo do ouro e dos diamantes”. Lisbon: Comissão Nacional para as Comemorações dos Descobrimentos Portugueses, 2000.
- Arquitectura e Poder, o Real Edifício de Mafra . 2ª ed.: Lisbon: Livros Horizonte, 2002.
- “A Sagração do Reino: em torno do(s) projecto(s) da Sé Velha”. Lisbon: Artis. Revista do Instituto de História da Arte da Faculdade de Letras de Lisboa, nº 3, 2004.
- A Morada da Sabedoria. I – O Paço Real de Coimbra: das origens ao estabelecimento da Universidade. Coimbra: Livraria Almedina, 2005.
- “À Flandres por devoção e à Itália por ostentação — ou ao invés. As razões do Manuelino”, Ao Modo da Flandres. Disponibilidade, inovação e mercado de arte na época dos Descobrimentos (1415–1580). Madrid-Lisbon: Fundación Carlos de Amberes, 2005.
- “António Canevari e a Arcádia Romana: subsídios para o estudo das relações artísticas Lisboa/Roma no reinado de D. João V”. Lisboa: VALE, Teresa Leonor M. (coord.), Lisboa Barroca e o Barroco de Lisboa, Colóquio de História da Arte, 2007.
- “Da “Nova Ordem” à “Nova Ordenação”: ruptura e continuidade na Real Praça do Comércio”. Lisbon, FARIA, Miguel Figueira de (coord. de), Praças Reais: passado, presente e futuro”, 2008.
- “Os pintores de D. João V e a invenção do retrato de Corte”. Lisbon: Revista de História da Arte, nº 5, 2008.
- “De Lisboa ao Caia: em torno do programa político e artístico da “troca das princesas”. Lisboa: Actas do Colóquio Lisboa e a Festa. Celebrações Religiosas e Civis na Cidade Medieval e Moderna, coord. VALE, Teresa Leonor, FERREIRA, Maria João Pacheco, FERREIRA, Sílvia, 2009.
- The Invention of Glory. Alphons V and the Pastrana Tapestries: Madrid: Fundacion Carlos de Amberes / Ediciones El Viso, 2010
- “El ‘intercambio de las princesas’: arte y politica en las fiestas de la boda entre Fernando de Borbón y Bárbara de Braganza”. Santiago de Compostela: Quintana, Revista do departamento de Historia da Arte, 2010.
- "A encomenda prodigiosa: da Patriarcal à Capela Real de São João Baptista". Lisbon: Museu Nacional de Arte Antiga: Imprensa Nacional-Casa da Moeda, 2013.
- “Invenit et fecit”: cinco peças e uma história complexa” (com BASTOS, Celina). In FRANCO, Anísio, PENALVA, Luísa, PIMENTEL, António Filipe (coord.) - Splendor et gloria: cinco joias setecentistas de excepção. Lisbon: Museu Nacional de Arte Antiga, 2014.
- “O Museu Nacional de Arte Antiga e o Museu Nacional do Prado: dois casos de estudo entre modelos de gestão” [com Miguel Zugaza Miranda]. In Revista Património. Lisbon. Nº 2, Nov. 2014.
- “Longos dias têm cem anos: Josefa de Óbidos e o barroco português”. In CAETANO, Joaquim Oliveira, CARVALHO, José Alberto Seabra, FRANCO, Anísio, e PIMENTEL, António Filipe (coord.) - Josefa de Óbidos e an invenção do barroco português: Lisboa, MNAA: Imprensa Nacional-Casa da Moeda, 2015.
- “Uma capela para o Rei de Portugal: história controversa de uma encomenda prodigiosa”. In VALE, Teresa Leonor M. (coord.) - A capela de São João Batista da Igreja de São Roque. an encomenda, an obra, as coleções, Lisboa: Santa Casa da Misericórdia de Lisboa-Museu de São Roque:INCM, 2015.
- “A capela real de São João Batista: um ‘debate desenhado’ entre Lisboa e Roma”. In VALE, Teresa Leonor M. (coord) - A capela de São João Batista da Igreja de São Roque: an encomenda, an obra, as coleções. Lisboa: Santa Casa da Misericórdia de Lisboa-Museu de São Roque:INCM, 2015.
- “MNAA 2010-2019. Para a História do Museu Nacional de Arte Antiga”, Lisbon: Palavras Límpidas, 2019.

== Honours ==
- Luxembourg: Knight of the Order of Merit of the Grand Duchy of Luxembourg
- France:Chevalier De L'Ordre des Arts et des Lettres
- Italy: Officer of the Order of the Star of Italy
