= Soup Kitchen in Arroios =

Coordinates: 38.7511°N 9.1525°W

- Sopa dos Pobres em Arroios (Portuguese)
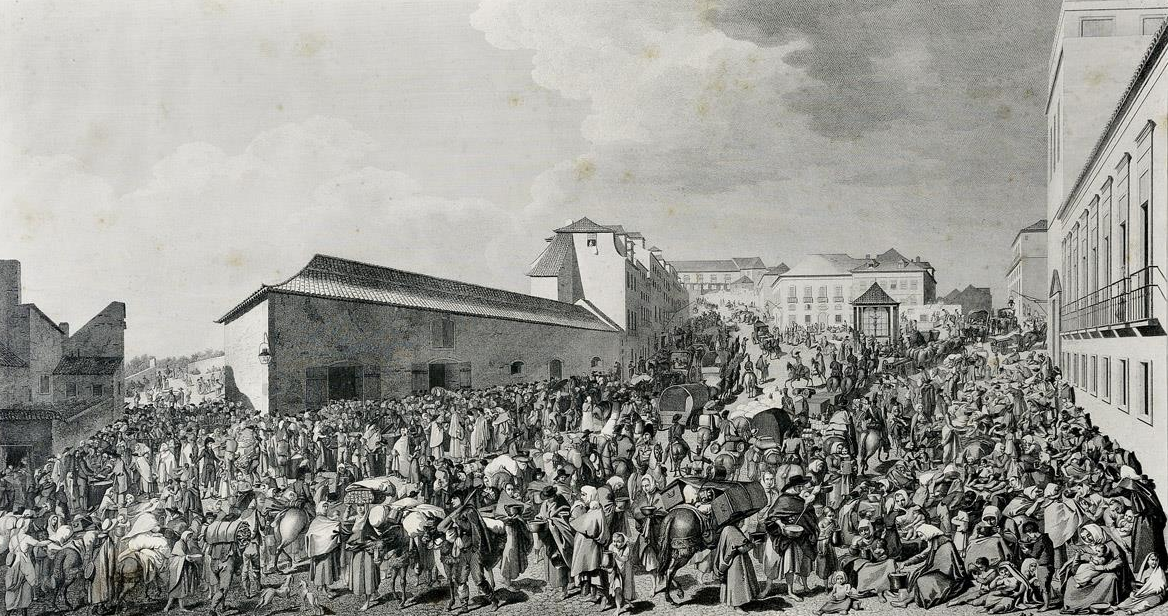
- Artist: Domingos Sequeira
- Year: 1813
- Medium: etching on paper
- Dimensions: 42 cm × 78 cm (17 in × 31 in)
- Location: Biblioteca Nacional de Portugal; Lisbon

Soup Kitchen in Arroios (Portuguese: Sopa dos Pobres em Arroios) is an etching by Domingos Sequeira, from 1813.

== Description ==
The painting is an etching on paper with overall dimensions of 42 x 78 centimeters. It is in the collection of the Biblioteca Nacional de Portugal, in Lisbon.

== Analysis ==
The etching scene shows the retreat of refugees around Lisbon, and food distribution.
