= Domingos Sequeira =

Portuguese painter (1768–1837)

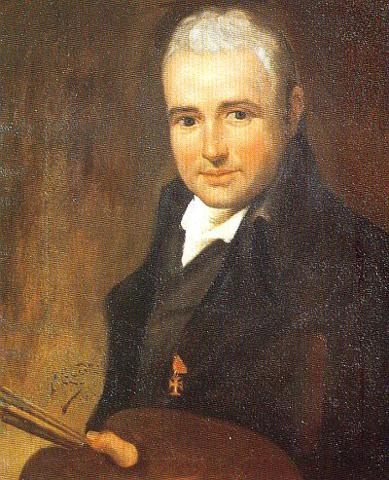
- Self portrait
- Born: Domingos António de Sequeira; 10 March 1768; Lisbon, Kingdom of Portugal
- Died: 8 March 1837 (aged 68); Rome, Papal States
- Known for: Fine Painting
- Movement: Neoclassicism

Domingos António de Sequeira (10 March 1768 – 8 March 1837) was a Portuguese painter at the Royal Court of King John VI of Portugal.

== Biography ==
He was born in Belém, Lisbon, into a modest family. He later changed his family name from Espírito Santo to the more aristocratic Sequeira. He studied art first at the academy of Lisbon, before moving to Rome, where he was Antonio Cavallucci's pupil.

By the age of thirteen, he had evinced such marked talent that F. de Setubal employed him as an assistant in his work for the João Ferreiras Palace. Sequeira resided in Rome from 1788 to 1794, when he was made honorary member of the Academy of St Luke. After another two years and further study in Italy, he returned to his native country with such a great reputation that important commissions for churches and palaces were immediately entrusted to him: scriptural subjects, large historical compositions and cabinet pictures.

In 1802, he was appointed first court painter and, in this role, executed many works for the prince regent, for Dona Maria Teresa, and for members of the court. He designed the valuable silver service which was presented by the Portuguese nation to Wellington, and a monument that was erected in 1820 in the Rossio square at Lisbon. In 1823, he visited Paris where he is known to have tried his skill in lithography and etching. In 1825, he painted the Death of Camões, which was considered by many to be the first proto-romantic or romantic Portuguese painting.

The last years of his life he spent in Rome, devoting himself chiefly to devotional subjects and to his duties as head of the Portuguese Academy. He saw a Turner exhibition in the late 1820s, that served as inspiration for some of his best paintings, like his Adoration of the Magi (1828). He died in Rome in 1837.

== Works ==
Among his best-known pictures are the Miracle of Ourique, Prince John Reviewing the Troops at Azumbuja, and The Adoration of the Magi. Numerous paintings by Sequeira are held at the Mafra National Palace, the Ajuda National Palace, and in the principal palaces and churches of Lisbon. The Museu Nacional de Arte Antiga (National Museum of Ancient Art), in Lisbon, has one of the best collections of his paintings.

== Gallery ==
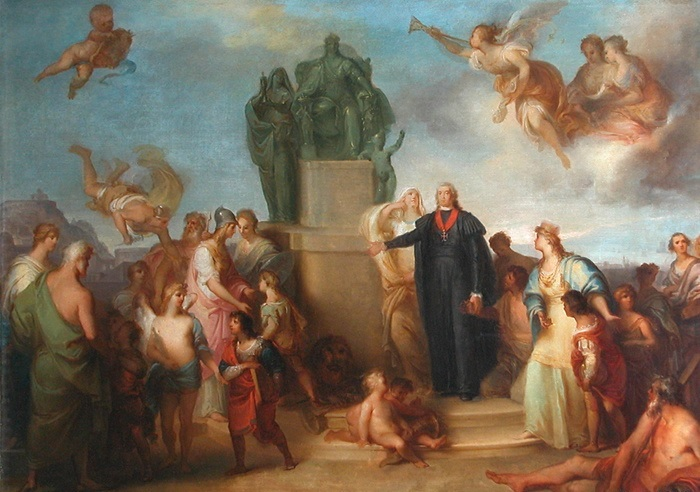
Alegoria à Fundação da Casa Pia, 1792-1794 (Musee du Louvre)

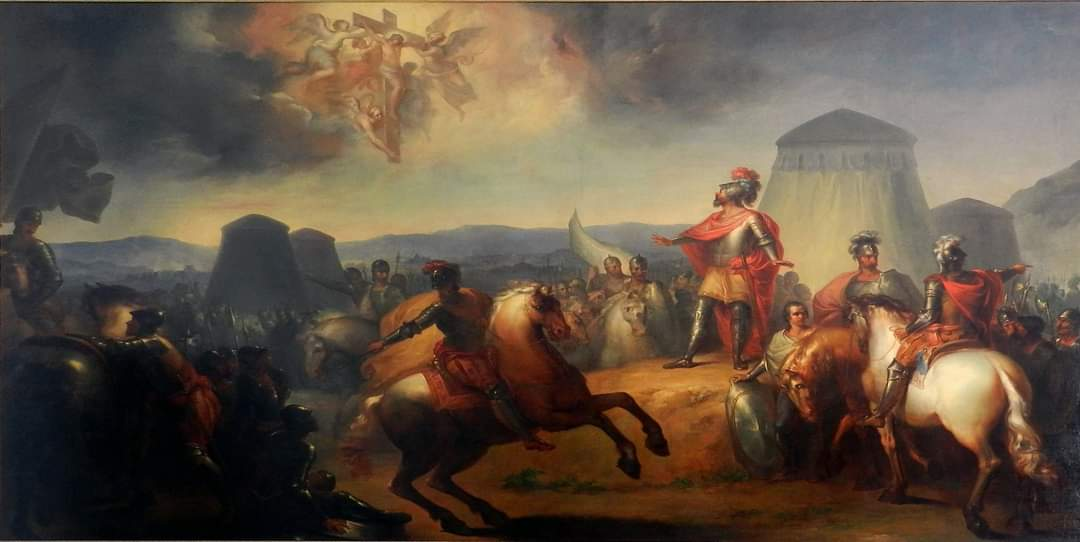
O Milagre de Ourique, 1793 (Musée Louis-Philippe)

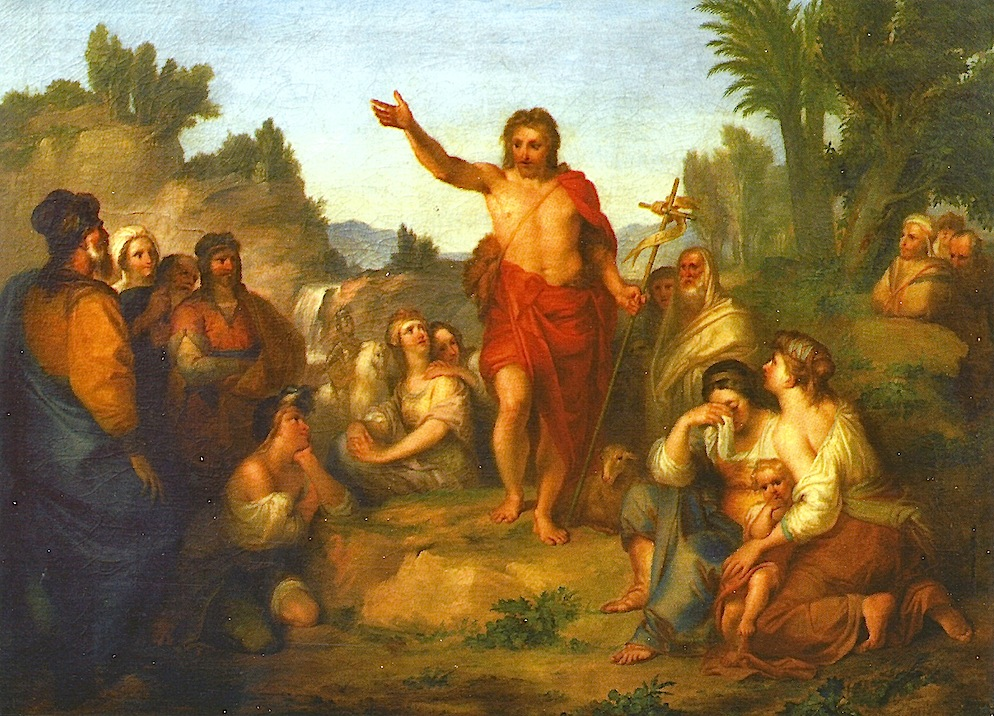
Pregação de S. João Baptista, 1793 (Ducal Palace of Vila Viçosa)

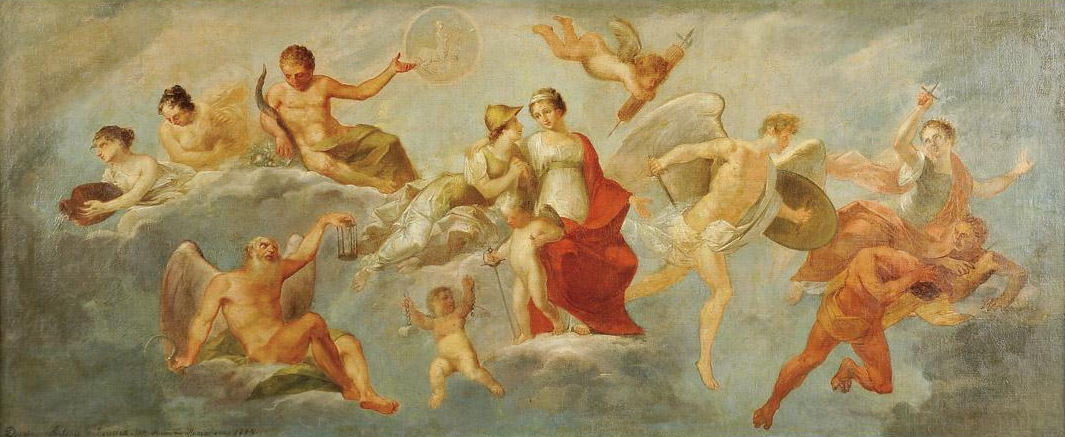
Deuses no Olimpo, 1794

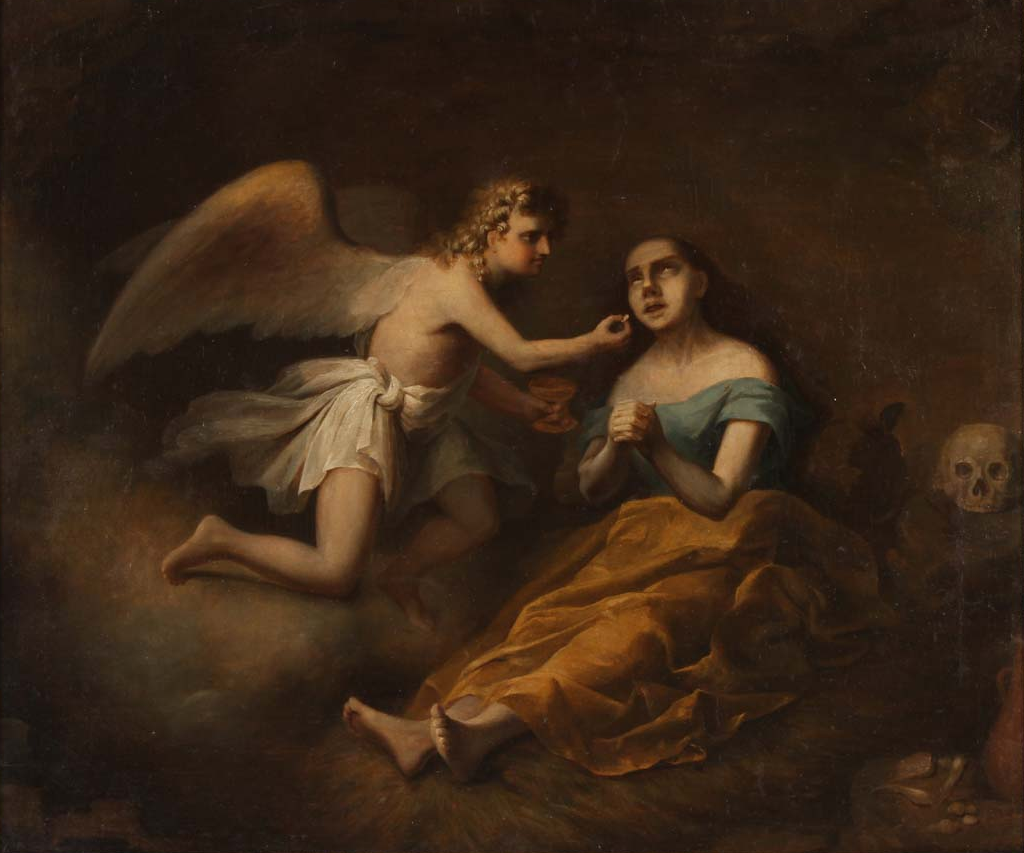
Última Comunhão de Santa Maria Madalena, c. 1800

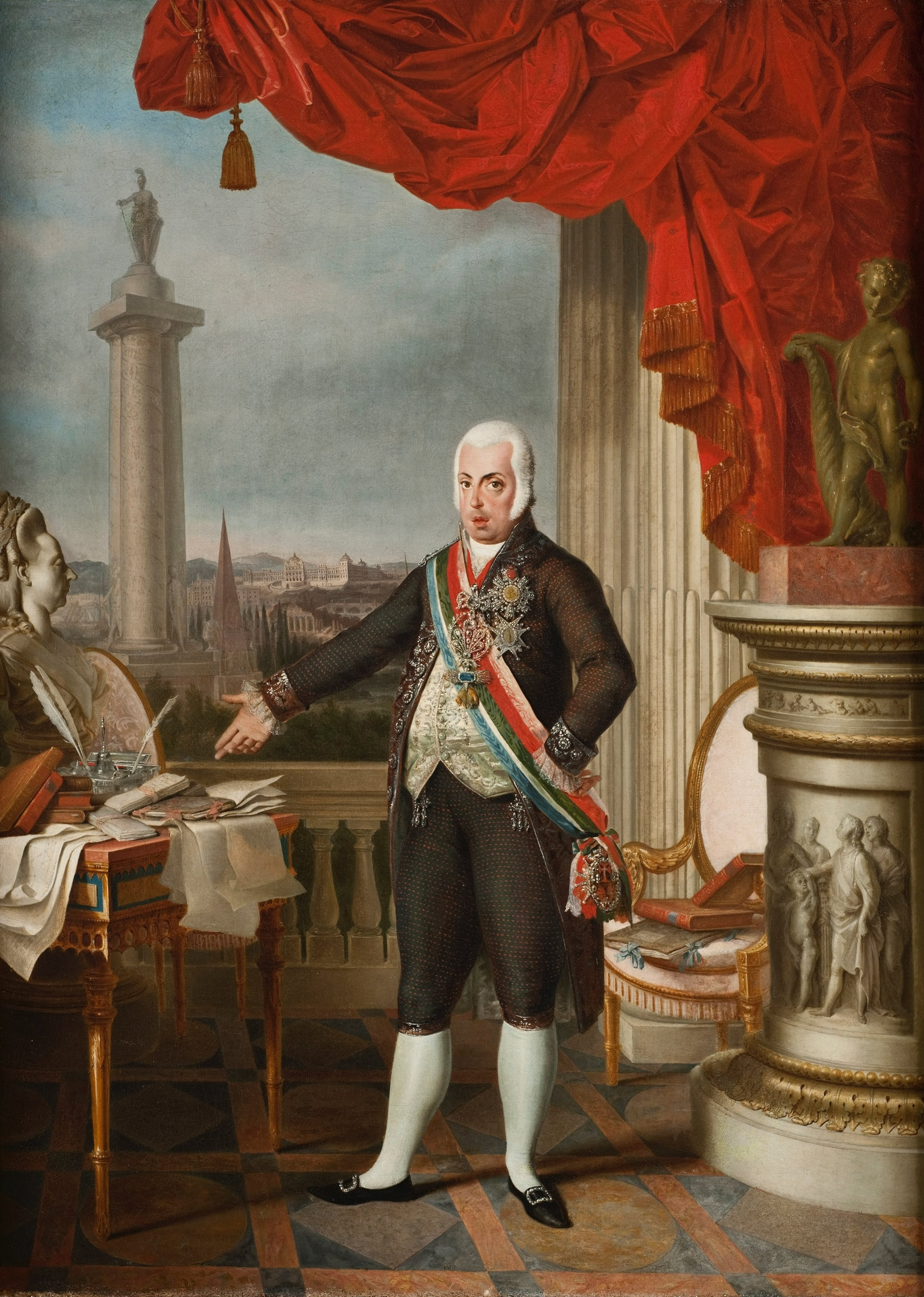
Príncipe Regente, João, 1802 (Ajuda National Palace)

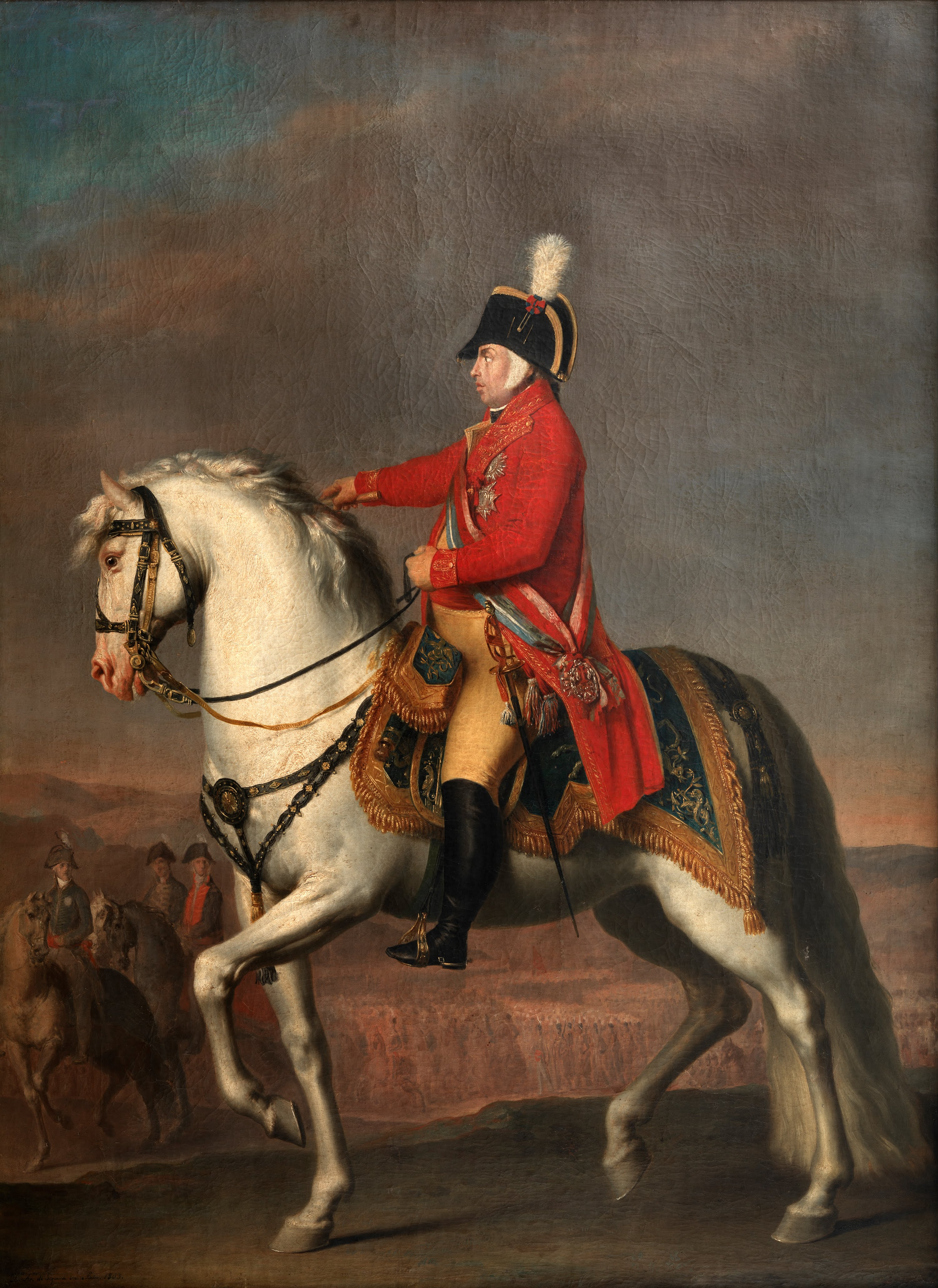
O Príncipe Regente passando revista às tropas na Azambuja, 1803 (Queluz National Palace)

Junot protegendo a cidade de Lisboa, 1808 (Museu Nacional Soares dos Reis)

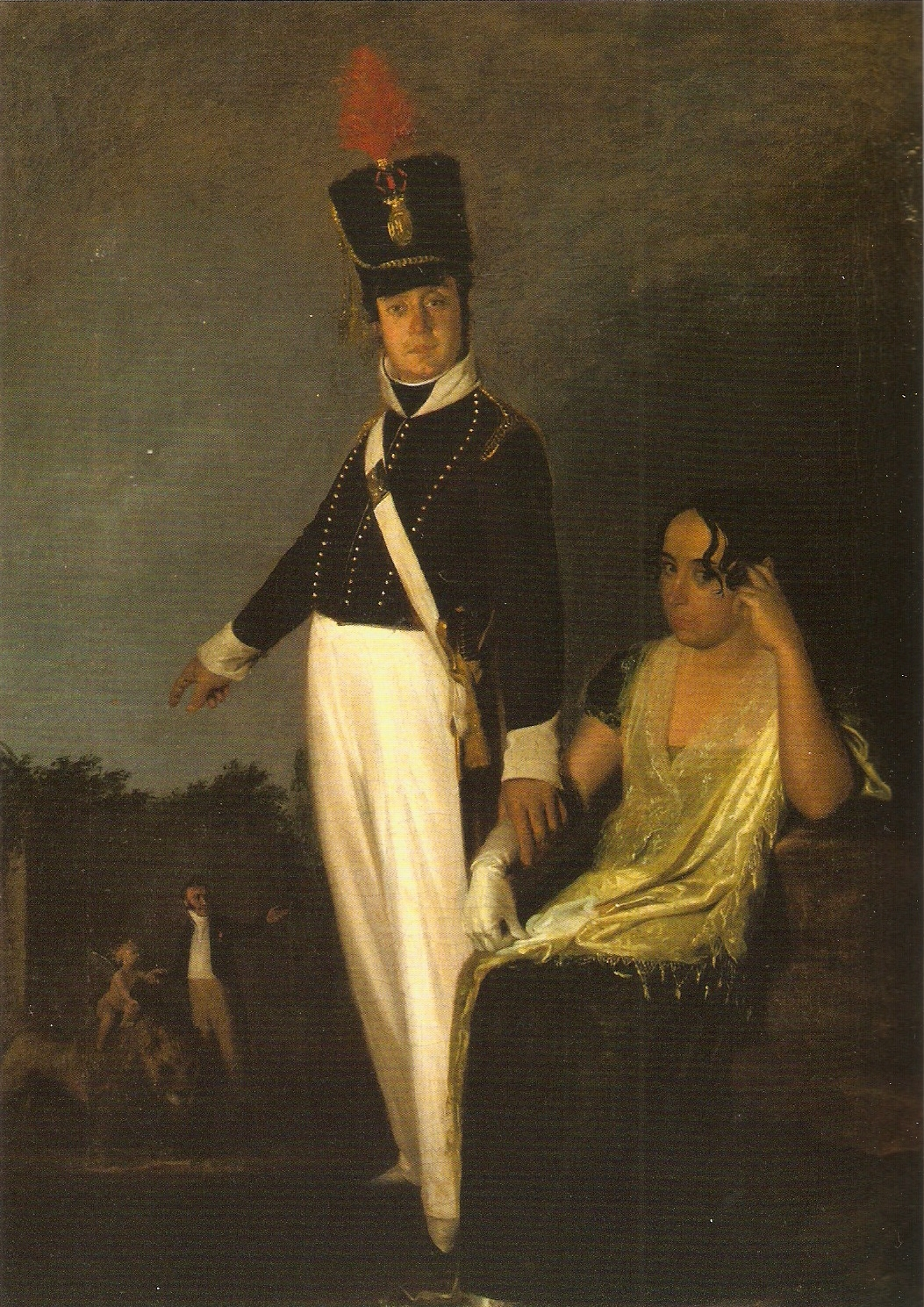
João Baptista Verde e Mariana Benedita, 1809 (Museu Nacional de Arte Antiga)

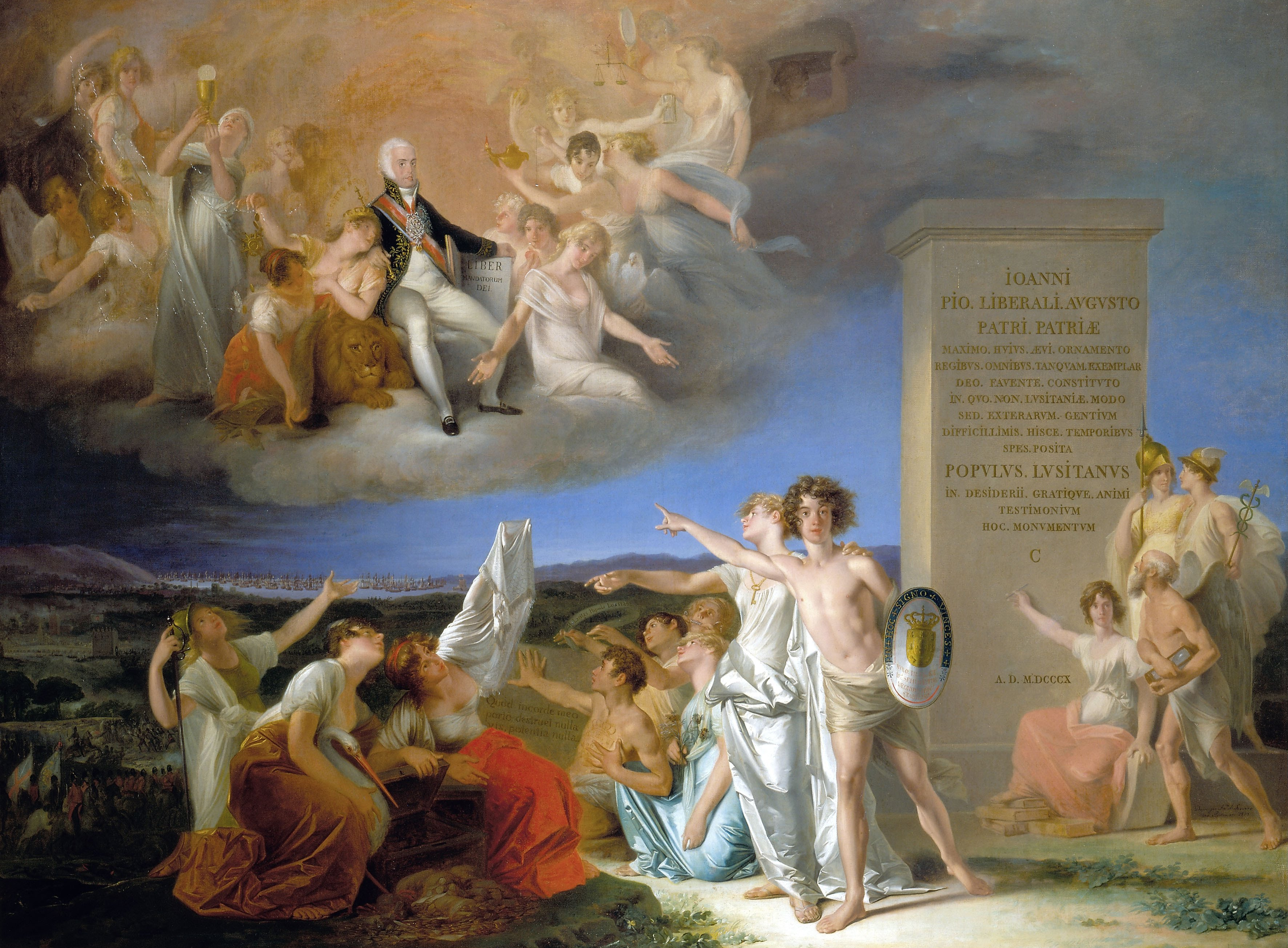
Alegoria às virtudes de D. João VI, 1810 (Queluz National Palace)

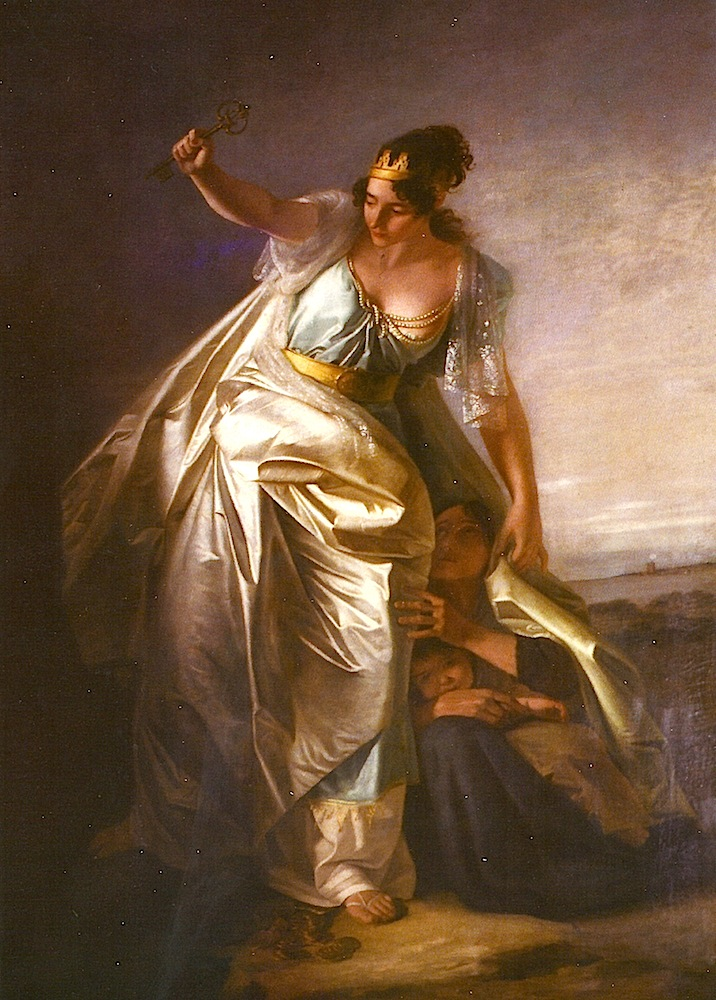
Lisboa protegendo os seus habitantes, 1812 (Pimenta Palace)

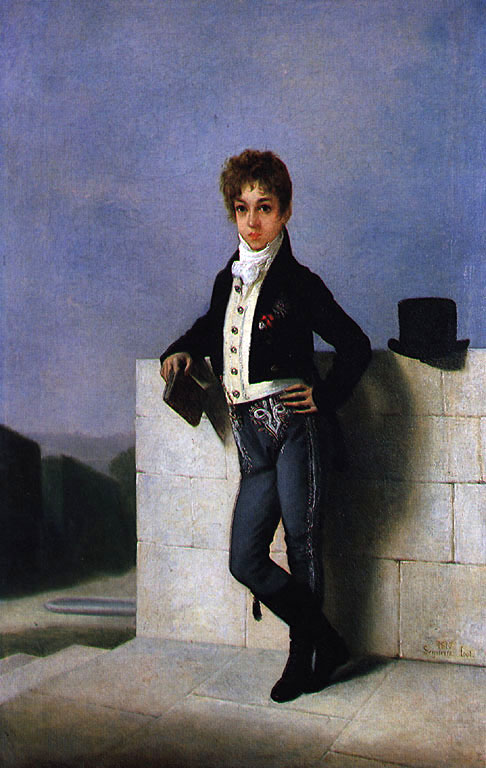
O Conde de Farrobo, 1813 (Museu Nacional de Arte Antiga)

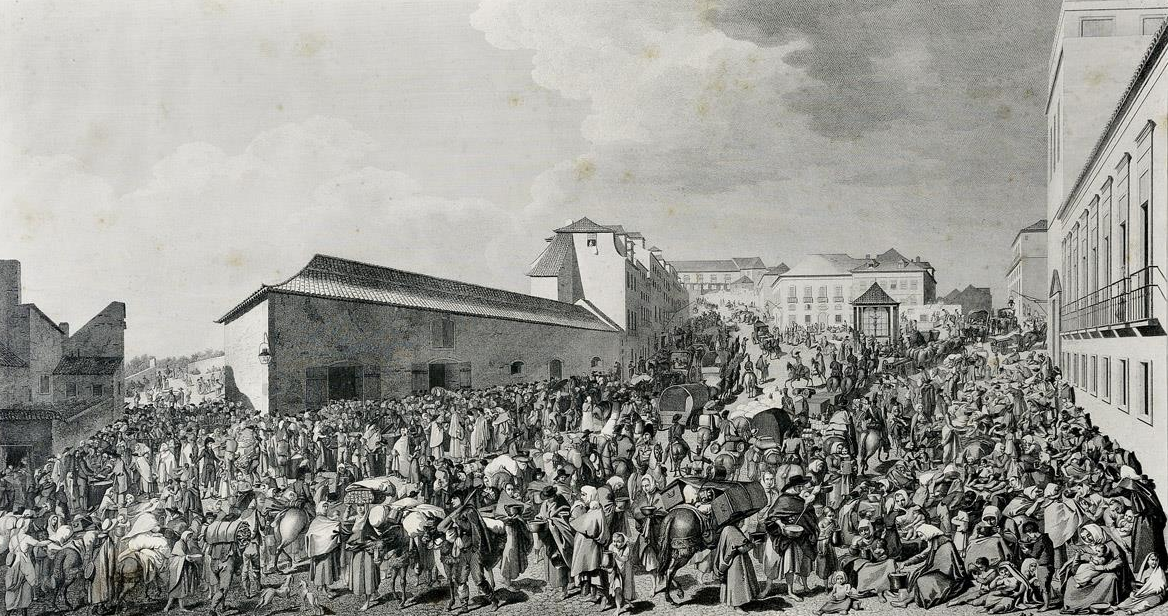
Soup Kitchen in Arroios, 1813

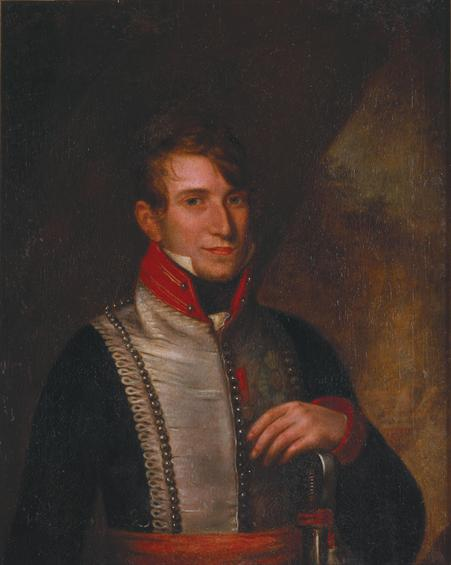
D. Pedro de Sousa Holstein, 1.º Duque de Palmela

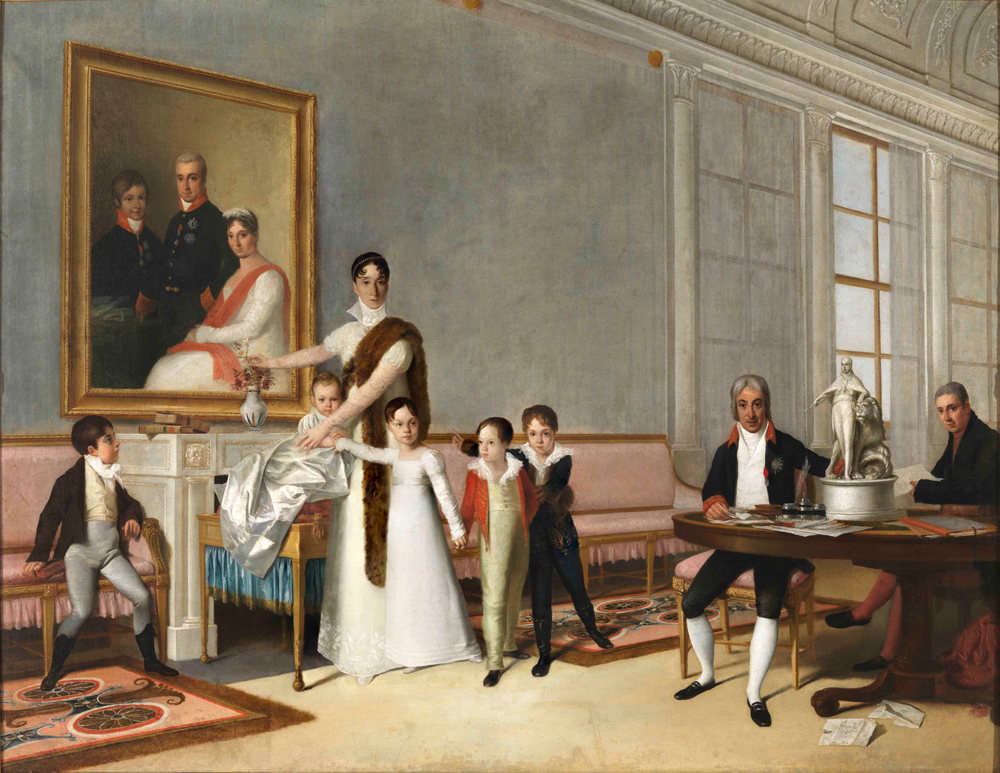
Família do Visconde de Santarém, 1816 (Museu Nacional de Arte Antiga)

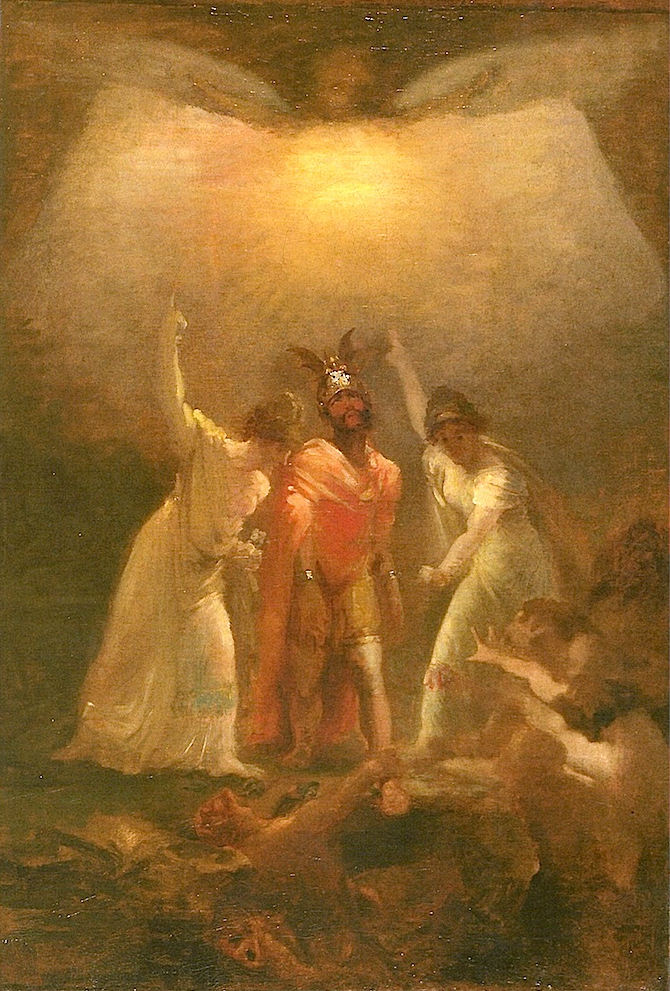
Portugal à beira do abismo, 1820

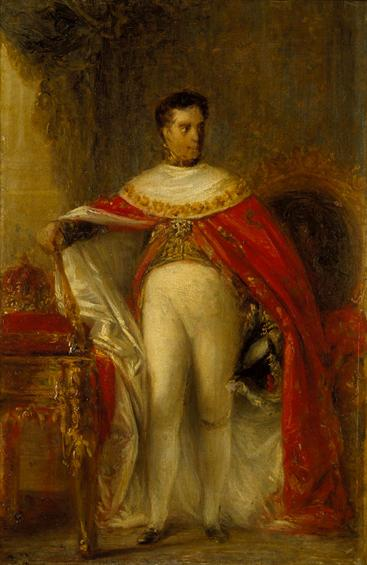
D. João VI, 1821

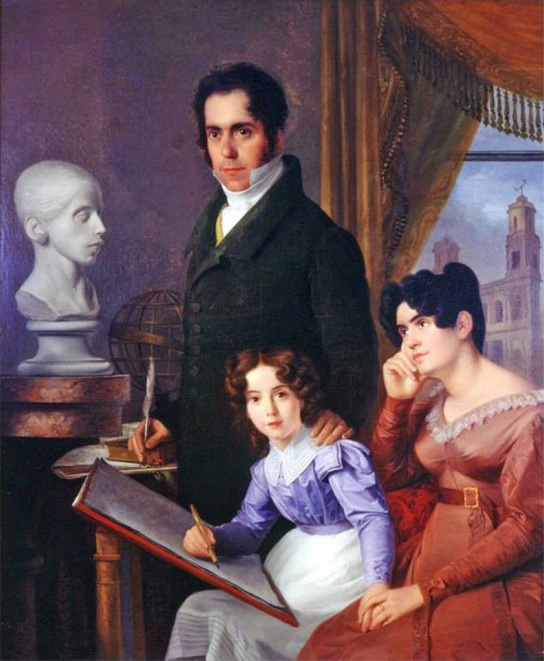
A Família Barros, 1822

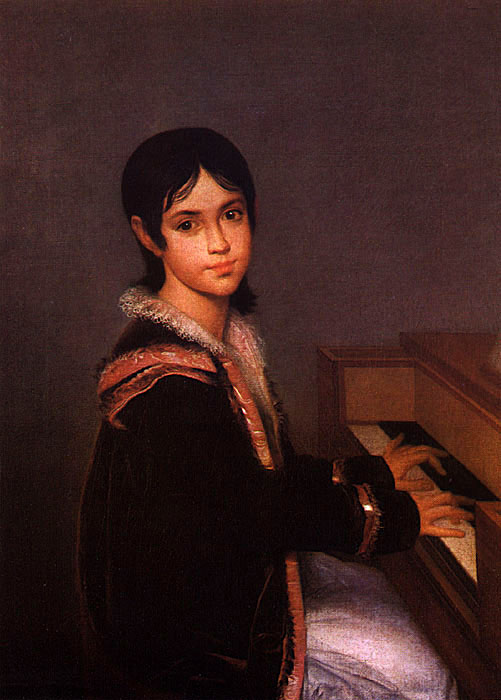
Mariana Benedita Sequeira, 1822 (Museu Nacional de Arte Antiga)

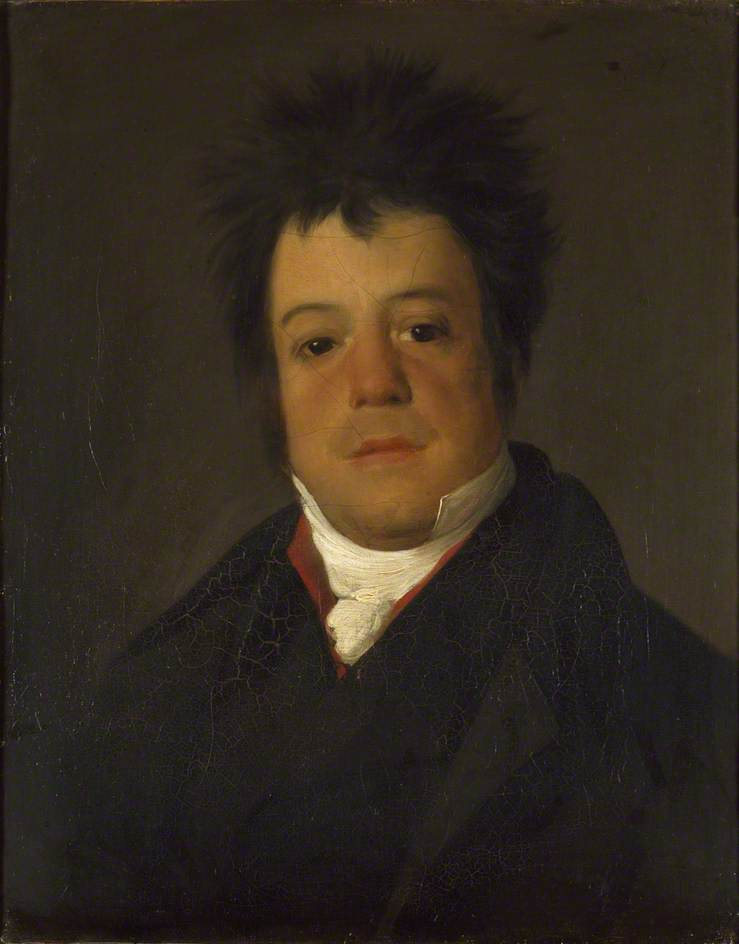
Adrião Ribeiro Neves, 1825 (Ashmolean Museum of Art and Archaeology)

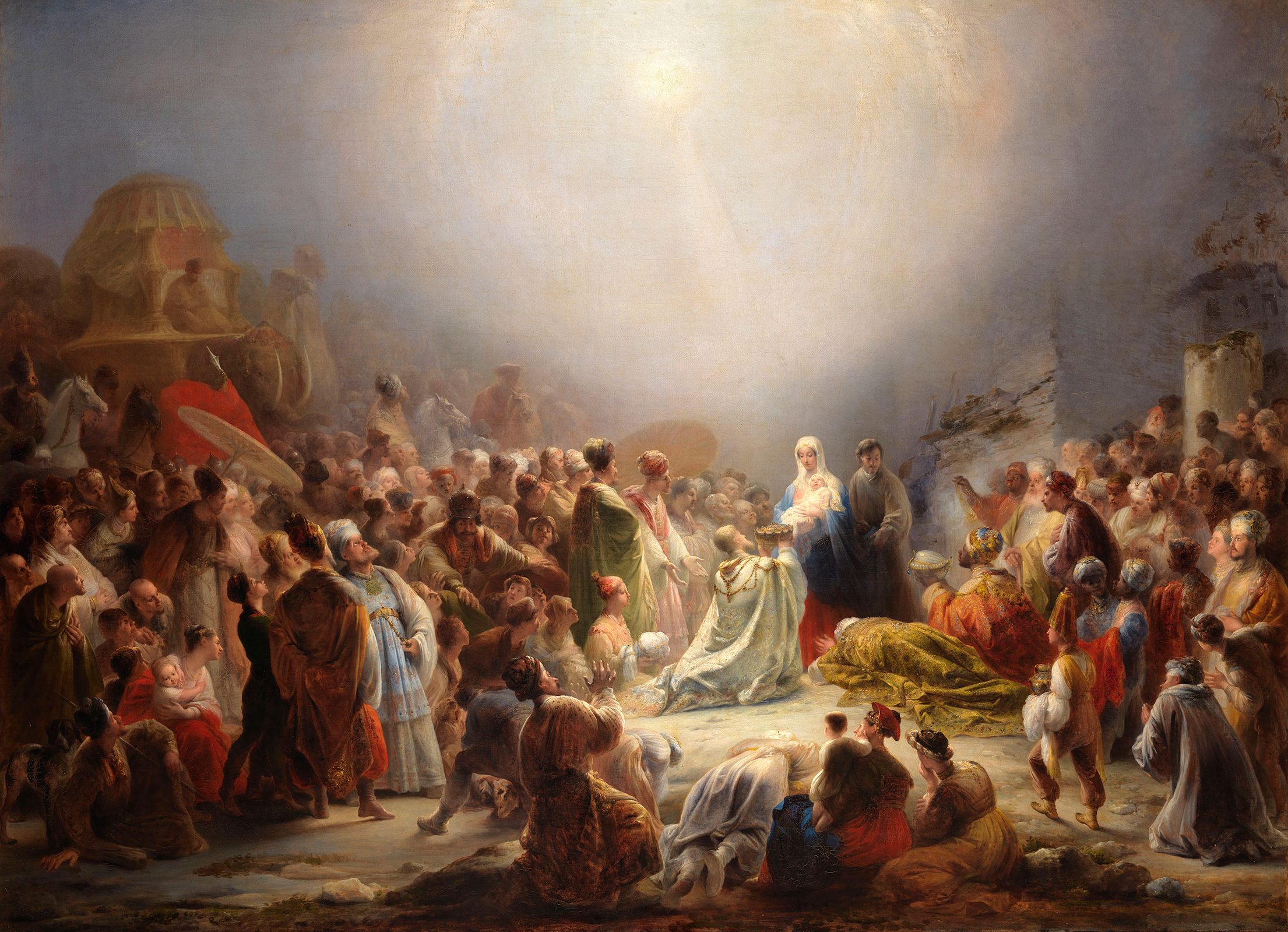
Adoração dos Magos, 1828

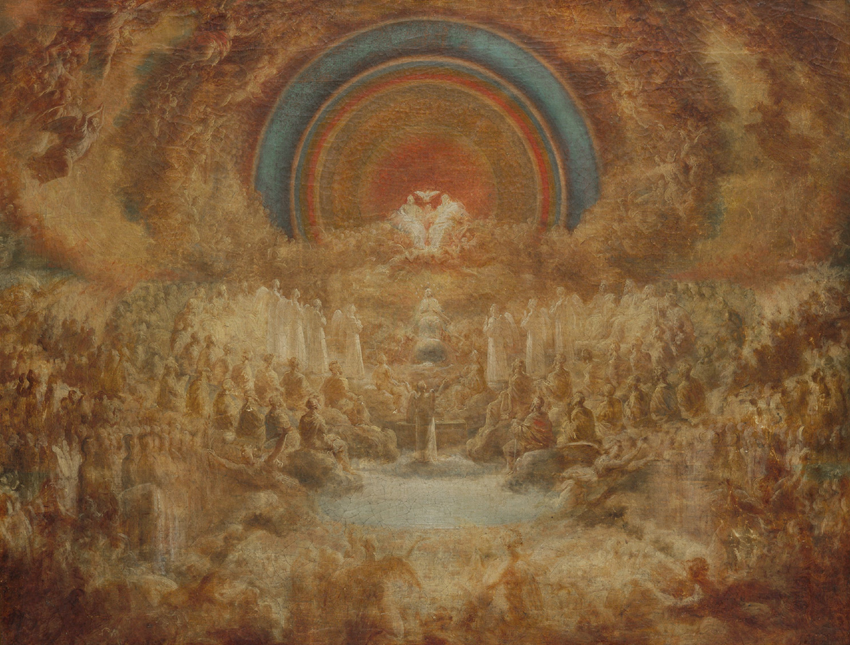
Coroação da Virgem, c. 1830 (Museu Nacional de Arte Antiga)

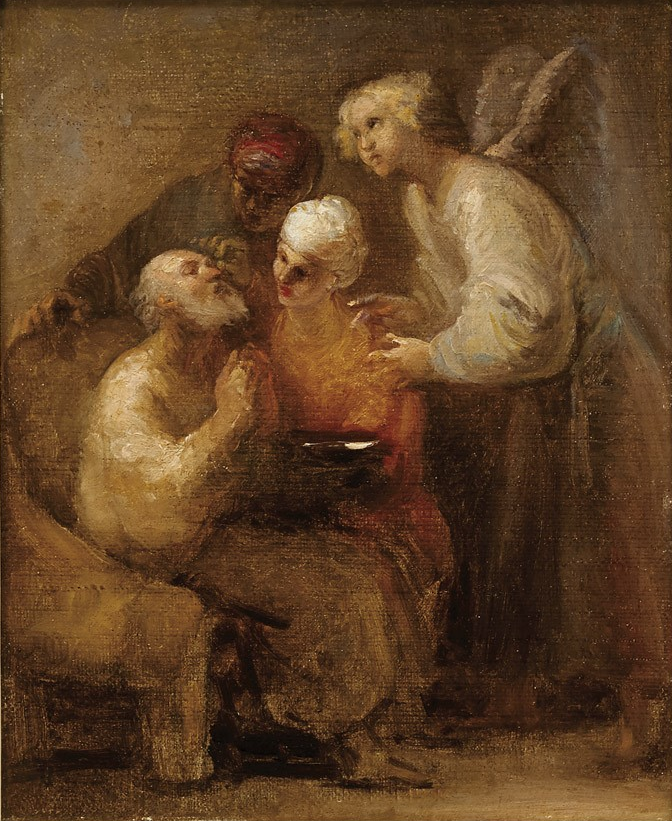
Tobias cura a cegueira de seu pai, S.D.

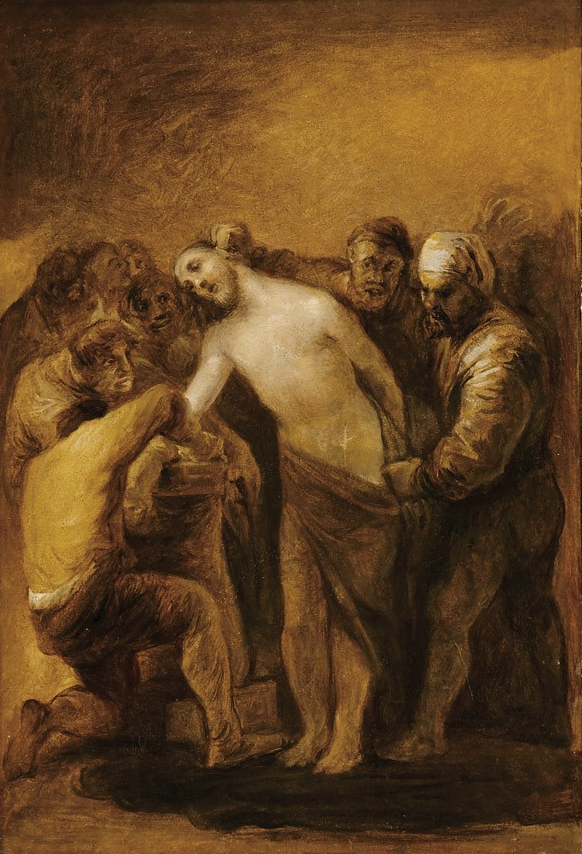
Jesus é despojado das Suas vestes, S.D.

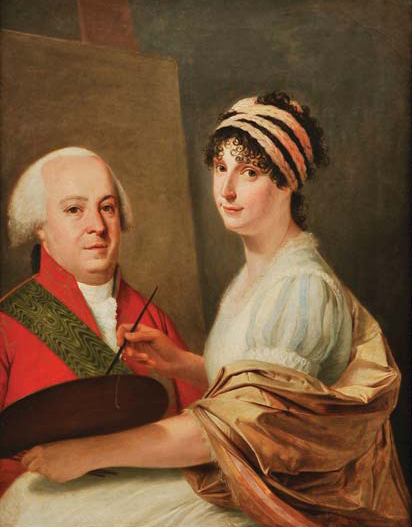
Retrato dos Condes de Linhares, S.D.

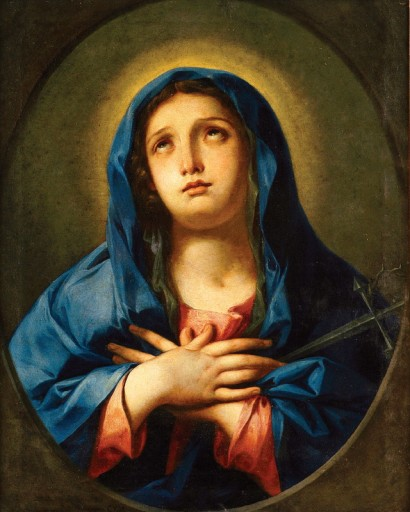
Nossa Senhora das Dores, S.D.

== Sources ==
- José-Augusto França, A Arte em Portugal no Século XIX, Lisboa, Bertrand Editora, 1991, volume 1.
