= José-Augusto França =

Portuguese historian (1922–2021)

José Augusto Rodrigues França GCIH GOIH GCIP (16 November 1922 – 18 September 2021) was a Portuguese historian, art critic, and professor.

== Biography ==
He attended the degree in Historical-Philosophical Sciences at the Faculty of Arts of the University of Lisbon (1941-45), never completing the course. He left for Paris, with a scholarship from the French State, in 1959, remaining there until 1963, having studied with Pierre Francastel at the Practical School of Advanced Studies. At the University of Paris IV (Panthón-Sorbonne) he successively obtained the degrees of Doctor in History, in 1962 — presenting the thesis Une Ville des Lumères: la Lisbonne de Pombal —, and, a few years later, of Doctor in Letters, in 1969 — presenting the thesis Le Romantisme au Portugal.

A leading author in the field of visual arts and culture in Portugal, his works include studies on art in Portugal in the 19th and 20th centuries, monographs on Amadeo de Souza-Cardoso and Almada Negreiros, and other volumes of essays on historical, sociological and aesthetic interpretation and reflection on problems of contemporary art.

== Awards and honors ==
- Medal of Honor of the City of Lisbon, 1992.
- Grand Officer of the Order of Prince Henry (10 June 1991).
- Grand Cross of the Order of Public Instruction (10 November 1992).
- Grand Cross of the Order of Prince Henry (30 January 2006).
- Medal of Cultural Merit (2012)
