= Carpeaux =

Carpeaux is a surname. Notable people with the surname include:

- Jean-Baptiste Carpeaux (1827–1875), French sculptor and painter
- Otto Maria Carpeaux (1900–1978), Austro-Brazilian literary critic
