= Riesener =

Riesener is a surname. Notable people with the surname include:

- Henri-François Riesener (1767–1828), French painter
- Jean Henri Riesener (1734–1806), German royal ébéniste
- Léon Riesener (1808–1878), French painter
