= Álvaro Pires de Évora =

Portuguese painter

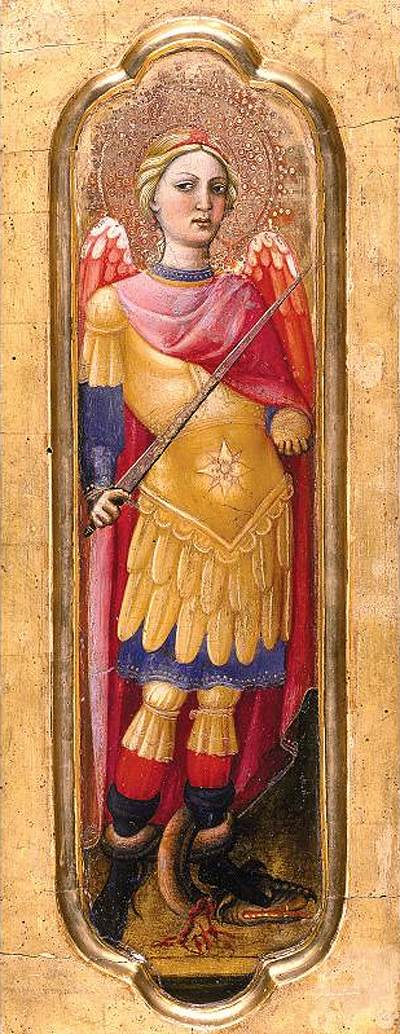
Archangel Michael

Álvaro Pires de Évora, or Alvaro di Piero (before 1411 – after 1434), was a Portuguese painter.

== Biography ==
He is assumed to have been born in Évora, Portugal and is known for religious works made between 1411 - 1450. He was first mentioned in Giorgio Vasari's 1568 update to his Le Vite delle più eccellenti pittori, scultori, ed architettori (in English, Lives of the Most Excellent Painters, Sculptors, and Architects). As a short addendum to his biography of Taddeo Bartoli, Vasari wrote "There lived at the same time and painted in almost the same manner, although he made the colouring more brilliant and the figures lower, one Alvaro di Piero, a Portuguese, who made many panels in Volterra, and one in S. Antonio in Pisa, and others in other places".
