= Deposition (Tiepolo) =

1770 painting by Giambattista Tiepolo

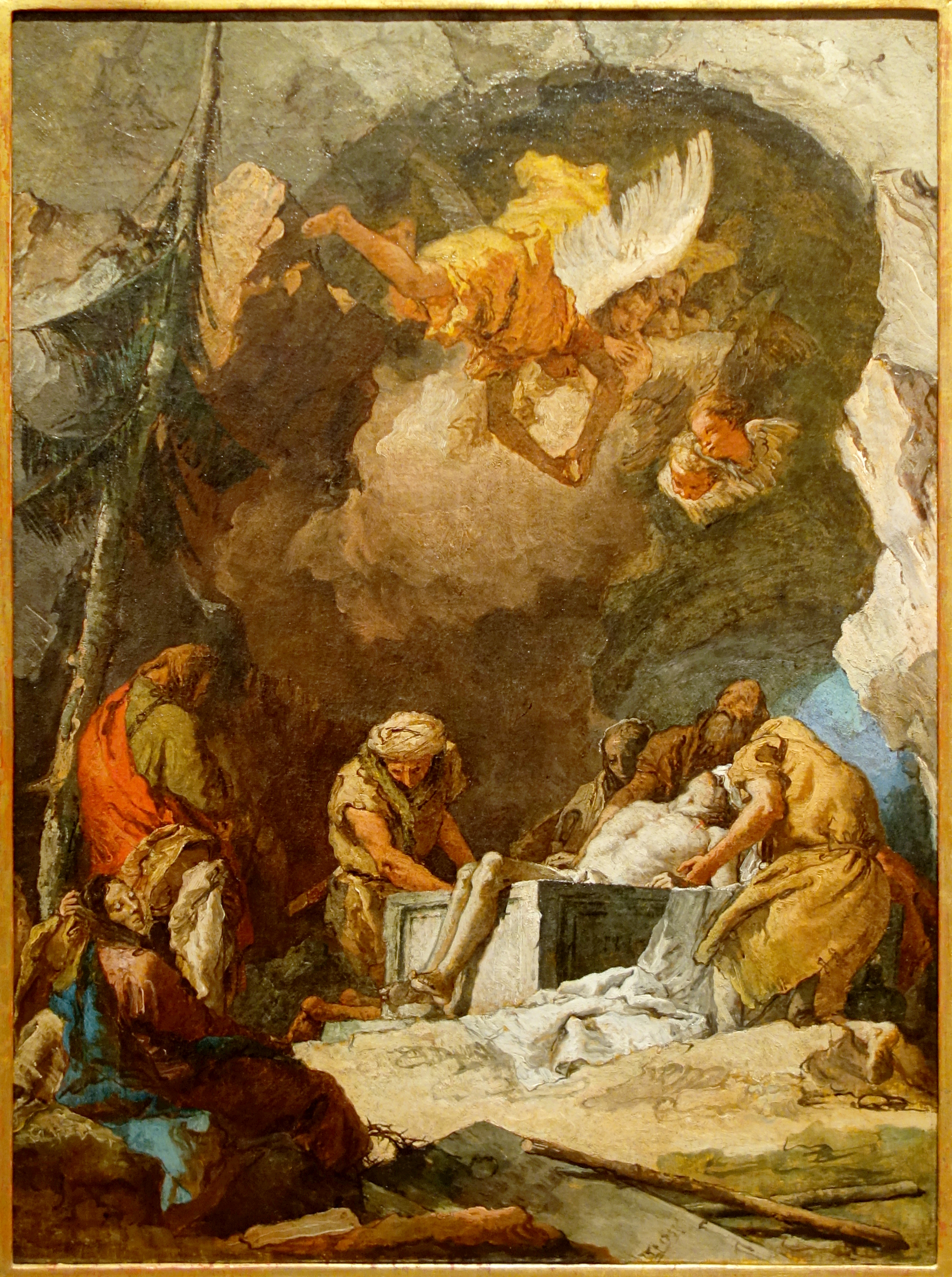
Deposition (1770)

Deposition is an oil-on-canvas painting by the Italian artist Giovanni Battista Tiepolo, one of his last works, produced in Madrid in 1770 less than a year before his death. It belonged to the Portuguese Pinto-Basto family for a long period and was bought in 2008 by the Museu Nacional de Arte Antiga in Lisbon, where it now hangs.

It was auctioned on 29 November 2007 by the auction house Leiria e Nascimento, with the Portuguese State exercising its purchase option right, and acquiring the work for 1.5 million euros.

On January 24, 2008, decree nº 2/2008 was published in the Diário da República, which enshrines the classification of the painting The Deposition of Christ in the Tomb as an asset of national interest. The way of protecting oil paintings on canvas, inventoried since 1939, is updated, and the "heritage and cultural value of significance for the Nation" is highlighted, justified by the "artistic genius and the excellence and patrimonial relevance of the work" by Giovanni Tiepolo, "expressed in the aesthetic, technical and intrinsic material value" of the painting acquired by the Portuguese State.

The painting has been on display at the National Museum of Ancient Art, in Lisbon since May 16, 2008, where other works by the painter can already be found: Escape to Egypt, donated in 1946 from the same private collection, and The Triumph of the Arts, incorporated from the royal collections.
