= ArtReview =

Magazine for contemporary art

- Cover of the November 2024 issue, featuring Hans Haacke
- Editor in chief: Mark Rappolt
- Categories: Contemporary art
- Frequency: Nine times a year
- Publisher: ArtReview Ltd
- Founded: 1949 (77 years ago)
- Country: United Kingdom
- Based in: London
- Language: English
- Website: artreview.com
- ISSN: 1745-9303

ArtReview is an international contemporary art magazine based in London. It was founded in 1948 as Arts News and Review and later renamed Arts Review before adopting its current title. The publication is one of the leading magazines covering contemporary art, criticism, and the global art market. Its sister publication ArtReview Asia was launched in 2013.

== History ==
Launched as a fortnightly broadsheet in February 1949 by a retired country medical practitioner, Dr Richard Gainsborough, and the first edition was designed by his wife, the artist Eileen Mayo, Arts News and Review set out to champion contemporary art in Britain, providing its readers with commentary, news and reviews. At the outset its focus was set firmly on the artist – its regular cover 'Portrait of the artist' introduced its readership to emerging artists as well as reconnecting with the past masters of modernism from before the war. Cover artists included Édouard Manet, Henry Moore, Barbara Hepworth and Lucian Freud. As its editorial would declare in 1954, Art News and Review's purpose was 'to stimulate the criticism of contemporary art, to give to both painters and writers space they would never find elsewhere, and to endeavour to present a balanced and comprehensive picture of living art in twentieth-century Britain.' Critics such as David Sylvester and John Berger, cut their teeth in its pages during the 1950s, as it covered the growing trend of abstract art, and the lively debates provoked by the arrival of American Abstract Expressionism, while Lawrence Alloway and Reyner Banham celebrated new attitude towards art that embraced science, industry and mass culture, elaborating the terms of what became known as 'Pop' art. In 1954 Henri Matisse wrote for the magazine.

Renaming itself Arts Review in March 1961, the magazine charted the advent of Pop art and the sharper look of 'New Generation' sculpture and hard-edge painting, while young critics like Brian Sewell balanced the merits of non-figurative art against socialist realism, and Jasia Reichardt, the assistant editor of the title, looked towards art's growing involvement with technology. By the end of the 1960s, Arts Review was pondering the 'unparalleled fragmentation' in art, remarking that art 'has still to find the power to draw communities together, and heal'. Socially-minded young critics such as Richard Cork, Peter Fuller and Janet Daley would bring their voices to the complexities of conceptual art in the recession-hit 1970s, a period marked by a conservative backlash against contemporary art. Arts Review weathered the economic turmoil of a changing art market into the 1980s, widening its attention to the resurgent markets and cultures of craft and design, while following the turn towards the new figurative painting and sculpture that characterised art in Britain during the Thatcher decade.

By 1993, Arts Review had relaunched as the monthly magazine Art Review. Sensing a new, more youthful and irreverent mood taking shape in contemporary art, it put Gilbert & George on the cover, and drew a growing readership to the work of the 'Young British Artists', towards the internationalising art world of the 2000s.

By 2006, ArtReview had reinvented itself once more, to grapple with the artistic product of an artworld now thriving not only in Britain, Europe and the US, but also in Asia, Latin America and Africa. Artists featured on the cover have included Yayoi Kusama, Subodh Gupta, Liam Gillick, Ai Weiwei, Thomas Hirschhorn, Keren Cytter, Steve McQueen, Yael Bartana, Phyllida Barlow, Dóra Maurer, Tacita Dean, Danh Vo, Sarah Lucas, Fernanda Gomes, Ragnar Kjartansson, Geta Brătescu. In 2012 ArtReview published a special supplement on Brazilian art history, and has since expanded its coverage of the country's art scene. In 2018 it produced an issue looking at the legacy of the Situationists.

In June 2019, the magazine announced that Modern Media Holdings had acquired a majority stake in its publisher ArtReview Ltd.

== Notable writers ==
Lawrence Alloway, J. G. Ballard, Reyner Banham, Cecil Beaton, Sister Wendy Beckett, John Berger, Nicolas Bourriaud, Michael Bracewell, Anita Brookner, Jan Carew, Matthew Collings, Maurice Collis, John Coplans, Richard Cork, Janet Daley, Marie Darrieussecq, Geoff Dyer, Kenneth Frampton, Peter Fuller, Patrick Heron, Anthony Hill, Stewart Home, Siri Hustvedt, Liam Gillick, Frederick Joss, David Lee, Henri Matisse, Eileen Mayo, Rosie Millard, Eric Newton, Victor Pasmore, Nikolaus Pevsner, Heather Phillipson, Herbert Read, Bryan Robertson, Arundhati Roy, Jasia Reichardt, Brian Sewell, David Sylvester, Marina Vaizey, Christian Viveros-Fauné, and Max Wykes-Joyce.

== Power 100 ==
Since 2002 ArtReview has published its annual Power 100 list, a guide to the 100 most powerful figures in contemporary art. The list is compiled up an anonymous international committee of art world professionals. The magazine claims that the list is judged according to a person's ability to influence the type of art that is being produced today, play a role in shaping the public perspective of art, they have to have been active in the previous 12 months before the list is published and have to have an international rather than exclusively domestic influence.

In October 2011, the magazine was criticised by the Chinese government for placing Ai Weiwei at number one of that year's Power 100. Chinese Foreign Ministry spokesman Liu Weimin responded "China has many artists who have sufficient ability. We feel that a selection that is based purely on a political bias and perspective has violated the objectives of the magazine".

== ArtReview Asia ==
ArtReview Asia was launched in 2013 as a quarterly magazine. Along with a quarterly Chinese edition of ArtReview, introduced in 2022 in collaboration with Yishu Shijie, ArtReview Asia offers an eclectic mix of content. This includes criticism, reviews, commentary, and analysis, complemented by commissioned projects from artists, informative guides, and a range of special supplements. Artists featured on the cover have included Lee Kit, Carsten Nicolai, Lee Bul, Ming Wong, Eko Nugroho, Cao Fei and Nalini Malani. Contributors include literary theorist Sung Ge, artist Heman Chong, novelist Prabda Yoon and novelist Charu Nivedita, who writes a regular column.

In 2016 and 2017 ArtReview Asia collaborated with the Shanghai art fair West Bund Art & Design to curate 'Xiàn Chǎng', a series of solo artist projects both within the fair around the local area.

== Website ==
The website, artreview.com, was launched in 2007. The website features art news and opinion pieces, as well as content from the magazine.
