= Stratmann =

Stratmann is a surname. Notable people with the surname include:

- Cordula Stratmann (born 1963), German comedian
- Dietrich Stratmann (1937–2026), German politician
- Günter Stratmann (1931–2010), German fencer
- Jörg Stratmann (born 1954), German fencer
- Linda Stratmann (born 1948), British writer of historical true crime, biography and crime fiction
- Martin Stratmann (born 1954), German electrochemist and materials scientist
- Veit Stratmann (born 1960), German contemporary artist
- Eckhard Stratmann-Mertens (born 1948), formerly known as Eckhard Stratmann, German politician
