= Fernando Pernes =

Portuguese essayist, professor and art critic

Fernando Pernes (Lisbon, 1936 - Porto, October 2, 2010) was a Portuguese essayist, professor and art critic.

== Biography ==
Fernando Pernes completed his art studies in France and Italy, granted by the Calouste Gulbenkian Foundation, first at the Sorbonne Paris, with the historian and art critic Pierre Francastel (1900-1970), then in Rome and Florence with Giulio Carlo Argan (1900-1992).

He initiated his activity as an art critic at the Vida Mundial magazine; He collaborated later in several publications, including magazines and O Tempo e o modo and Coloquio-Arte. The relevance of his work in that area was recognized early, having been awarded the Art Criticism Prize, given by The Calouste Gulbenkian Foundation in 1965.

Until 1974, Pernes was president of the Portuguese section of the International Art Critics Association and was part of the leadership of the National Society of Fine Arts, where he created a modern art gallery and promoted art history courses. He also directed or collaborated in private galleries (Gallery Disclosure, Lisbon; Gallery 111 / Zen, Lisbon and Porto).

Settled in Port in 1973. He was professor of Faculty of Fine Arts, University of Porto; in charge of the direction of art and culture supplement of the Official News. After the Carnation Revolution of April 25, 1974, he became director of the Contemporary Art Center National Museum Soares dos Reis. In 1979 joined the Commission for the creation of the new National Museum of Modern Art, which would result in the Serralves Foundation, in which he would be the first artistic director (1987-1996) and cultural advisor of the Board of Directors.

Fernando Pernes was one of the art critics and curators more attentive to new generations of Portuguese artists. Since the end of the 1960s he was the author of monographs on Portuguese artists and numerous texts and essays on national and international art. His life and work have been recognized and awarded the Order of Merit by President Mario Soares and the Gold Medal of the City of Porto (Porto City Council).
