= Serralves =

Cultural institution in Porto, Portugal

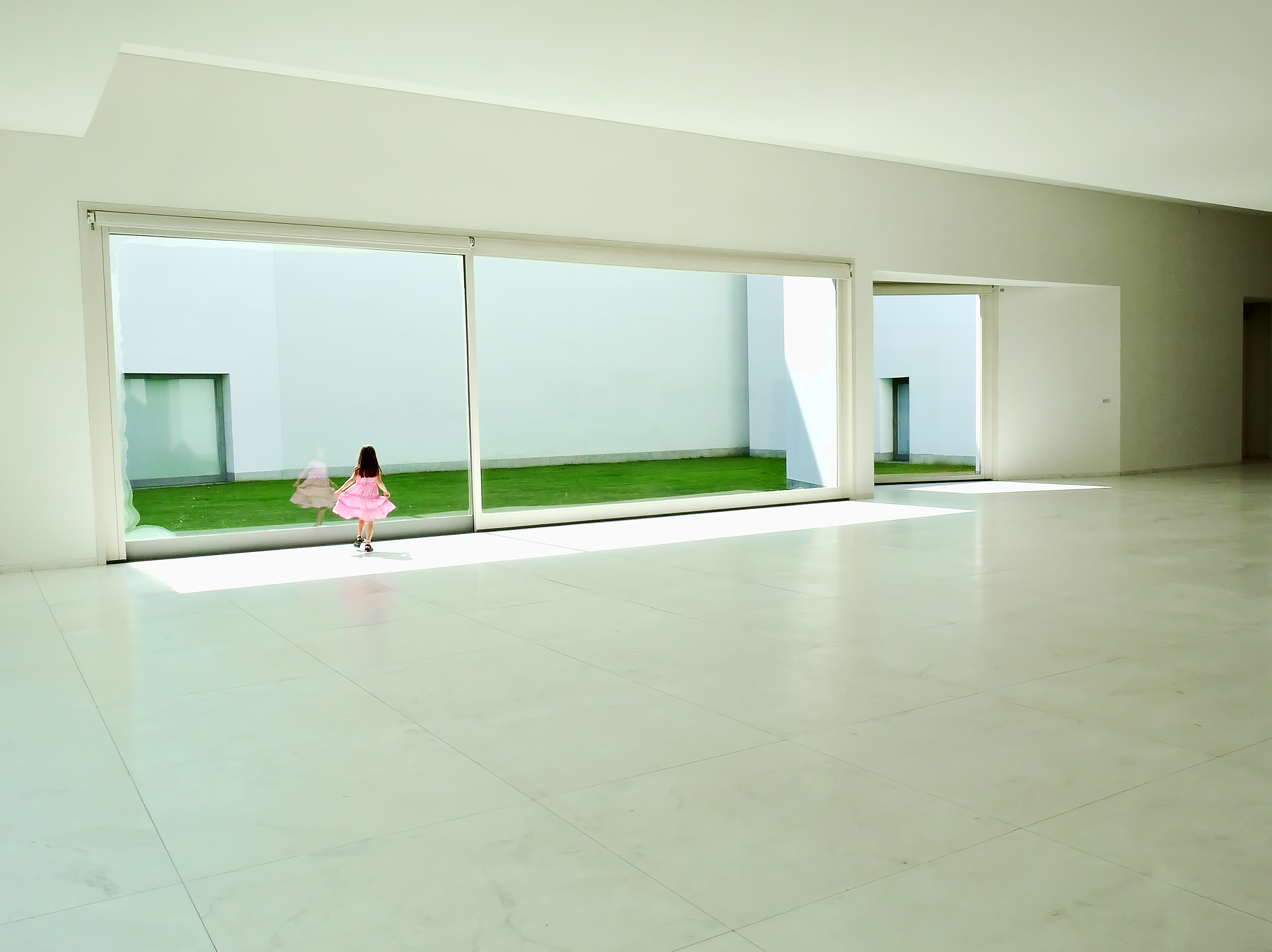

- Location within Porto
- Established: 6 June 1999
- Location: Porto, Portugal
- Coordinates: 41.1585°N 8.6577°W
- Visitors: 1,340,670 (2010-2012)
- Director: Philippe Vergne
- Owner: Serralves Foundation
- Public transit access: See below
- Website: serralves.pt

Serralves is a cultural institution located in Porto, Portugal. It includes a contemporary art museum, a park, and a villa, with each one of these being an example of contemporary architecture, Modernism, and Art Deco architecture. The museum, designed by Álvaro Siza Vieira, is now the second most visited museum in Portugal (almost 1 million visitors per year).

== Foundation ==
Serralves Foundation (Fundação de Serralves or Parque de Serralves) is an art foundation in which the primary goal is "to raise the general public's awareness concerning contemporary art and the environment."

Serralves Foundation is constituted by the Museum, designed by the architect, Álvaro Siza Vieira, who won the Pritzker Architecture Prize in 1992. The Villa (Casa de Serralves) is a unique example of Art Deco architecture, and the Park won the "Henry Ford Prize for the Preservation of the Environment" in 1997.

The buildings of Serralves - Casa de Serralves, Park, Museum of Contemporary Art, Auditorium and Library - were jointly classified by the Portuguese State as a "Building of Public Interest" in 1999 and as a "National Monument" in 2012.

Serralves develops its activities around 5 strategic axes: Artistic Creation, Audience Formation and Awareness-Raising, The Environment, Critical Reflection on Contemporary Society and The Creative Industries.

- Artistic Creation emphasizes the fine arts, through the constitution of a premier international contemporary art collection and an exhibitions program that features leading Portuguese and international artists, plus music, performing arts and film cycles that complement and enhance the exhibition program.
- Audience Formation and Awareness-Raising are achieved through innovative programs, tailored to all audience segments and ages. An example of this is the annual festival, Serralves em Festa.
- The Environment is enhanced by highlighting the Park as a public leisure zone merging art and the landscape.
- Critical Reflection on Contemporary Society is developed through the study and discussion of key contemporary issues, within the fields of the arts, social sciences, experimental sciences and politics.
- The Creative Industries: The Foundation assumes a pioneering role, through the creation of INSERRALVES (the first specialized creative industries incubator in Portugal), and its active contribution to ensuring that the North region becomes Portugal's first creative industries cluster, via the ADDICT association.

The Foundation management model conciliates partnerships with Founders and cooperation with the State. There are currently 181 founders, including companies, private individuals and other institutions. Special Patron Status is reserved for Founders who stand out because of their ongoing commitment to Serralves, embodied through their contribution to the Annual Fund.

The actual President of the Foundation is Luís Braga da Cruz, former Portuguese Finance Minister.

=== History ===
During the immediate period after the 1974 revolution, the city of Oporto hosted several social movements that demanded the creation of an exhibition space in the city, in order to exhibit art produced at that time. The importance of several initiatives - in particular the Centre of Contemporary Art, which was managed from the outset by Fernando Pernes and which remained in operation until 1980 - played a key role in consolidating the artistic universe in Oporto. These achievements were recognized by the Secretary of State for Culture, Teresa Patrício Gouveia, when she chose the city as the location for the future National Museum of Modern Art.

The State acquired the Serralves Estate in December 1986 for this purpose. On this date, and prior to the creation of the Serralves Foundation in 1989, a Founding Committee was constituted, whose members were Jorge Araújo, Teresa Andresen and Diogo Alpendurada. Serralves Park and Villa were opened to the public on May 29, 1987. The creation of the Foundation, via Decree-Law no. 240-A/89, of July 27, signaled the beginning of an innovative partnership between the State and civil society - encompassing around 51 public and private sector bodies at that time.

The Foundation signed a contract in March 1991 with the architect Álvaro Siza to design the Museum building. The Museum was inaugurated on June 6, 1999.

To house the art collection of Serralves (estimated in more than 4,000 works in 2014), the Foundation promoted in 2008 an international competition for the architectural design of Pólo Serralves 21, a multifunctional building and museum branch in Matosinhos on the former grounds of EFANOR (Northern Manufacturing Company), owned by Sonae the company founded by Belmiro de Azevedo. The winner project was designed by the architects Kazuyo Sejima and Ryue Nishizawa of the Japanese studio SANAA (Pritzker prize in 2012). However, the project was canceled in 2010 for lack of funding and agreement with the local government of Matosinhos.

In September 2014, an enlargement project was presented by Alvaro Siza to expand the premises of Serralves by transforming the garage of the Villa in the new Casa do Cinema Manoel de Oliveira.

== Museum ==
The Serralves Museum opened in 1999 in order to give Porto a space dedicated to contemporary art. The programming combines in-house production of exhibitions with co-productions with international institutions, enabling the circulation of works by both Portuguese and foreign artists.

The exhibitions - normally three parallel exhibitions – are organized on a quarterly basis.

Since the inauguration of the Museum building in 1999 a total of 4.6 million visitors have visited the various spaces of the Foundation.

=== Architecture ===
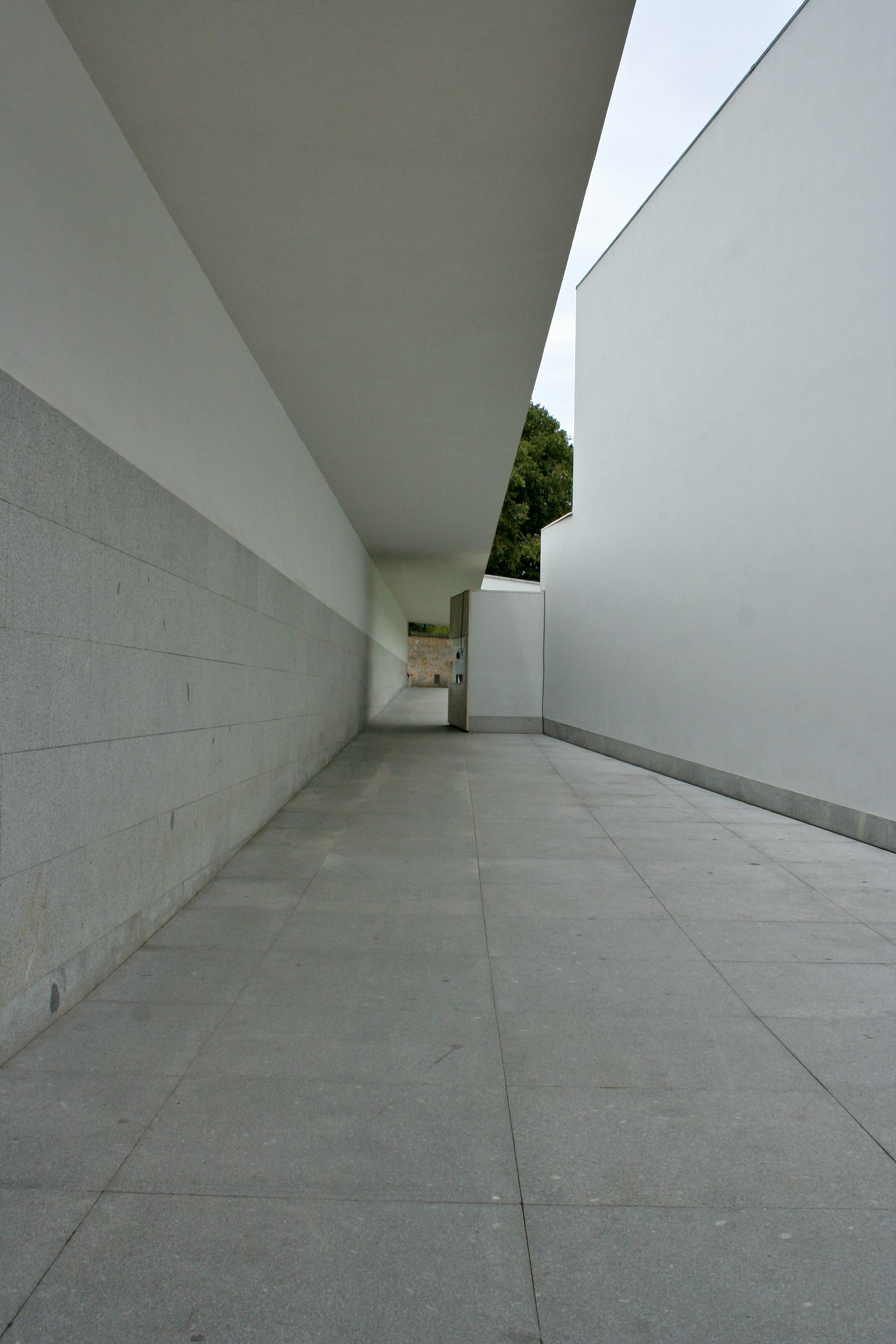
Museu de Serralves

The Serralves Foundation signed a contract in March 1991 with the architect, Álvaro Siza Vieira, in order to draw up an architectural project for the museum. Construction began five years later on the former vegetable gardens of the Serralves Estate. Siza was invited to design a museum project that took into consideration the specific characteristics of the physical setting and the need for integration within the surrounding landscape. The Museum is the Foundation's primary exhibition space and establishes a direct interaction with the Park, where several installations and sculptures may be found.

The 13,000-square-meter building, which includes 4,500 square meters of exhibition space in 14 galleries, opened its doors to the public in 1999, with the old Casa de Serralves serving as the foundation's head office. In 2000, an auditorium was added.

The building is built in a longitudinal manner from North to South, with a central body divided into two wings, separated by a patio, thus creating a U-shaped structure, complemented by an L-shaped construction, which creates a second patio between the latter building and the main building. This patio serves as the main access to the Museum, with a connection to the underground car park and gardens.

The Museum has exhibition rooms and storerooms for works of art, distributed across three floors. The upper floor is the location of the cafeteria/restaurant, esplanade and multi-purpose rooms, the entrance floor has exhibition rooms and a bookshop, and the lower floor houses the library and auditorium. Access to these spaces is facilitated via a square-shaped atrium located next to the reception, complemented by a cloakroom and information area, in an area adjacent to the Museum entrance. The Museum building also has a workshops area and another area for activities of the Educational Service, together with complementary areas such as a shop and a large terrace overlooking the Park.

As in most of Siza's buildings, the furniture and fittings were also designed by the architect, including lighting fixtures, handrails, doorknobs, and signage. Materials include hardwood floors and painted walls in gesso with marble skirting in the exhibition halls, and marble floors in the foyers and wet spaces. Exterior walls are covered with stone or stucco.

=== Collection and exhibitions ===
The museum opened with a proposal of works for the collection, most of which were bought in the subsequent years. Since 2003, the library has featured Mario Pedrosa (2003), a site-specific ceiling installation composed of 77 manufactured glass globes by Tobias Rehberger. Today, the collection is constituted by direct acquisitions by the museum, works deposited by the State and private collectors and also donations. From the beginning, the collection and the various exhibitions have focussed on the period following 1968. There are no permanent exhibitions, but the museum hosts five exhibits from invited artists every year. In recent years, the museum has organized exhibitions by Alvaro Lapa, Jorge Pinheiro, Franz West, Roni Horn, Claes Oldenburg and Coosje van Bruggen, Richard Hamilton, Christopher Wool, Luc Tuymans, Monir Shahroudy Farmanfarmaian, Ana Jotta. Serralves shares exhibition costs with the likes of the Whitney Museum of American Art, the Whitechapel Gallery or Museum Ludwig, among others.

The symbolic start date for the collection is 1968, but it refers specifically to the socio-cultural events of the second half of the 1960s which, in addition to the consecration of pop art, witnessed the launch of the bases of dematerialisation of artworks, the mingling of formal genres, the use of film, photography and text to underpin conceptual projects and blurring of the lines between art and life, accompanied by widespread agitation for new political and social ideas. In Portugal, the late 1960s paved the way for the experimentalism of the 1970s and the beginning of a dialogue that was more informed by international experiences and relationships between Portuguese artists and their foreign counterparts.

=== Directors ===
The first director was Vicente Todolí (born in Valencia, Spain, in 1958). After his position as Chief Curator (1986–88) and then artistic director of IVAM (Instituto Valenciano de Arte Moderno) 1988–96, he joined the Museu Serralves as its founding Director in 1996, participating in Siza's new building project for the Contemporary Art Museum, inaugurated in 1999. His last project at Serralves was the first Francis Bacon exhibition in Portugal, "Caged-Uncaged".

In 2003, Vicente Todolí was appointed Director of the Tate Modern in London and João Fernandes, who had been with the museum since its opening in 1999, succeeded him as director until 2013. Under Fernandes, exhibitions at the Serralves included "Robert Rauschenberg: Travelling '70–'76" (2008) and "Bruce Nauman: One Hundred Fish Fountain, 2005" (2008).

In 2013, the British art historian Suzanne Cotter, former Guggenheim Abu Dhabi curator, succeeded João Fernandes.

Upon the departure of Cotter in 2018, João Ribas, then Chief Curator, was promoted to director.

In 2019 Ribas resigned the directorship over a controversy regarding censorship, and subsequently departed Portugal for a position with the California Institute of the Arts in Los Angeles.

After being ousted as Director of the Museum of Contemporary Art, Los Angeles, in 2018 the French curator and director Philippe Vergne was appointed the new director of Serralves in 2019.

== Casa de Serralves ==
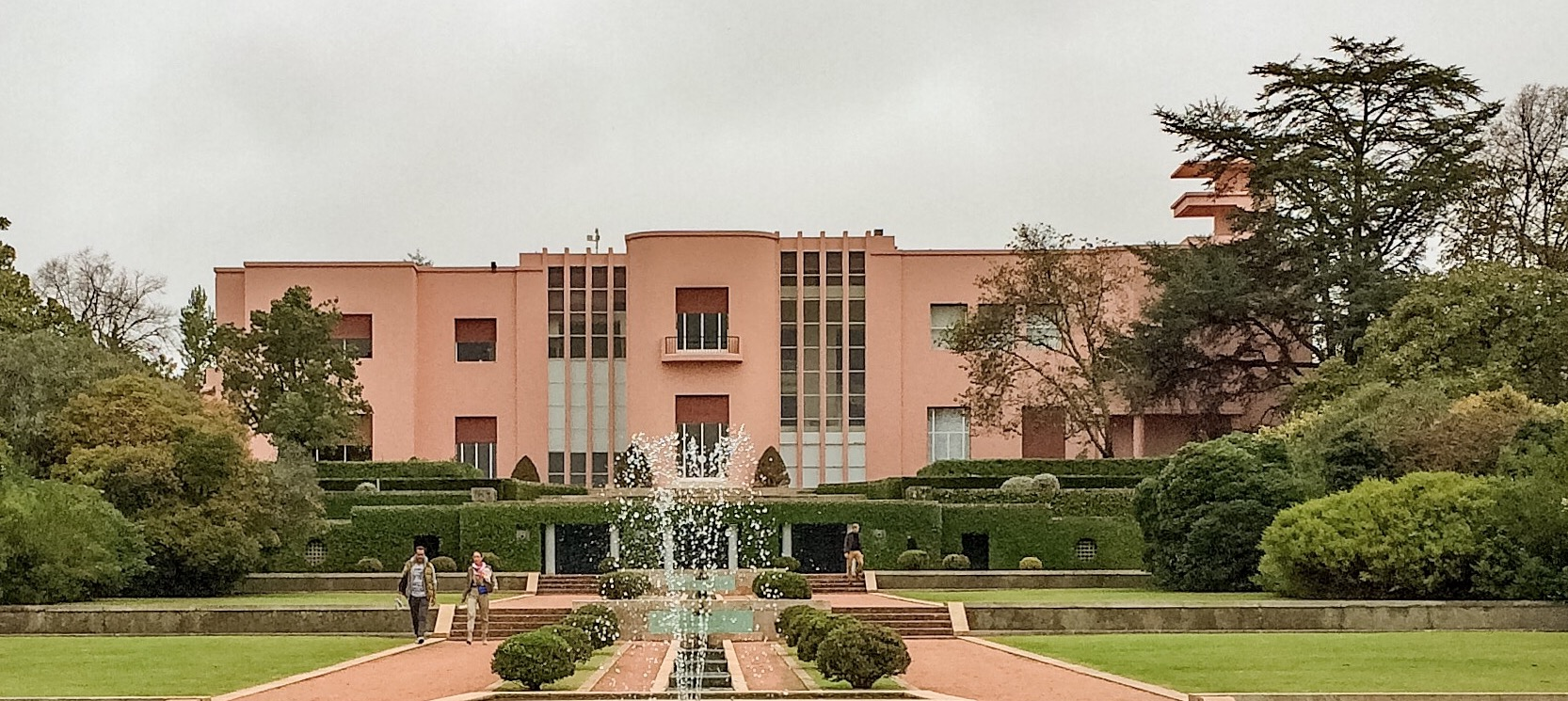
Casa de Serralves

Casa de Serralves is a villa and museum located inside the park of Serralves. Owned by the Serralves Foundation, the house was built by the second Count of Vizela, Carlos Alberto Cabral and designed by the architect José Marques da Silva. It is an example of Streamline Moderne architecture in Portugal.

In addition to serving as the Foundation's head office, the building is an extension of the Museum of Contemporary Art, used for the presentation of temporary exhibitions. Its façade overlooks the Rua de Serralves and the main entrance located in the Avenida Marechal Gomes da Costa, Casa de Serralves is a significant example of Art Deco style. The building was constructed on the outskirts of Porto between 1925 and 1944, combining neoclassical, romantic and art deco elements.

=== History ===
Serralves was originally the summer residence of the Cabral family, residing in the centre of Porto since the early 19th century. Diogo José Cabral, a textile manufacturer whose industry lay in Vale do Ave, came into the property on his marriage to María Emília Magalhães. This signaled the start of a number of alterations to the property, in which Diogo José Cabral Jr., first Count of Vizela (1864-1923), played a key role. He was a reference in the industrial modernization of the country and received his title in 1900.

As Quinta de Lordelo, in one of the expansion areas of the city, it had featured in the topographical map of Porto by Telles Ferreira (1892). It was situated between terraced buildings in Rua de Serralves, their rear courtyards extending down to woods and fields.

Pre-1925 photographs of Quinta de Lordelo, highlight a 19th-century upper-middle-class home with a romantic garden. After the death of Diogo José Cabral Jr., in 1923, his son Carlos Alberto Cabral (1895-1968), second Count of Vizela, then aged 28, inherited the family state on Rua de Serralves. The property was much smaller than it is today. A number of purchases and exchanges enlarged it to its current 18 hectares. In the interim, the property changed its name to Quinta de Serralves.

Alberto favored the artistic currents prevalent between the 1920s and the 1940s, in particular French architecture and French decorative arts, encouraged by his visit to Paris to the International Exposition of Modern Industrial and Decorative Arts in 1925. There he met Charles Siclis (1889-1942), an architect whose 1929 watercolors are behind the referential image of the Villa, Jacques Émile Ruhlmann (1879-1933), decorator and architect, and Jacques Gréber (1882-1962), the architect who was invited to design the new garden.

With the aid of the Porto architect José Marques da Silva (1869-1947), the author of the first drafts of the Villa and the Park, Carlos Alberto Cabral gradually put together different views and contributions. The House of Serralves is considered to be one of José Marques da Silva's greatest achievements.

Gréber had designed several gardens in Europe and North America. His plans for Serralves date from 1932, constituting a break with the Portuguese context of the time.

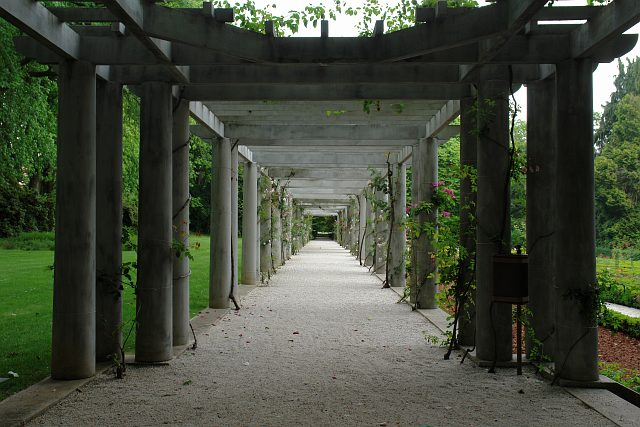
Rosaleda

The garden plans were based on Marques da Silva's drafts, according to which “the predominant law is always to compose the garden for the house to which it is the requisite companion”.

Completed in the mid-1940s, Quinta de Serralves is the result of almost twenty years of designs.

In the post-war environment of 1953, however, Cabral failed to adapt to industrial progress and was forced to sell his property. All that remains of that period is the photographic record from Casa Alvão, commissioned by the then-owner.

Like the first owner, the second owner of Serralves, Delfim Ferreira (1888-1960), inherited and consolidated the textile empire of his father, Narciso Ferreira.

The property was purchased by the State in October 1986. An ad-hoc committee was then charged with managing the heritage and adapting the space to a public purpose. Casa de Serralves opened to the public on 29 May 1987.

Serralves Foundation was incorporated on 27 June 1989 by Executive Act nº 240-A/89. Its articles of association establish the “promotion of cultural activities in the field of all arts”, perceiving its space - the Villa and the gardens – as an indivisible whole, opening it to the public, preserving its character, guaranteeing the survival of the principles that lay behind its conception, not giving in, however, to a static, dated image but rather attempting to adapt the space to the living structure provided by the framework of its time.

In 2004, Serralves Villa was subject to a restoration initiative by the architect, Álvaro Siza. With a total area of 900 square metres, 700 square metres are used as exhibition spaces, which was why the conservation intervention, in particular a restoration intervention, was necessary.

=== Structure ===
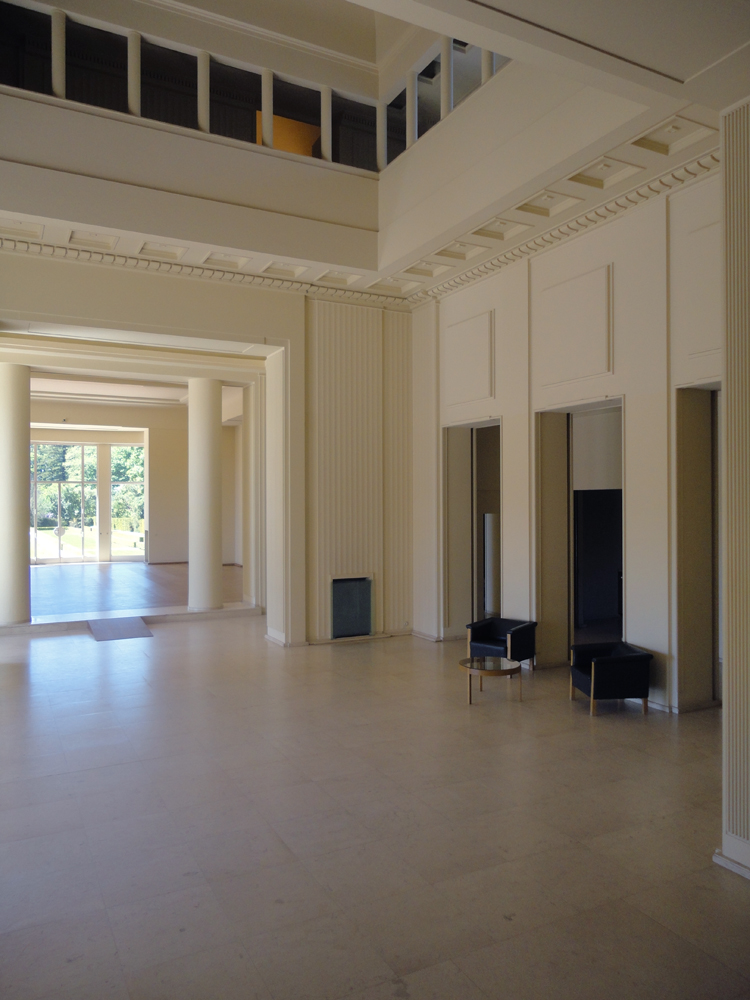
Casa de Serralves. Interior

The building's interior is distributed across three floors: a basement floor, which includes the kitchen, pantry and service areas; a ground floor including all the living rooms, dining rooms, atriums and library; and a first floor which corresponds to the private quarters. Visitors entering the Villa through the main entrance from the street, which is relatively dark, will gain their first impression of the building's structure and its relationship with the garden, from the impressive two-storey central hall. Looking in front, through the vast exterior window, they will see the central parterre and park. Looking to the right, they will see the vast salon which extends via the window to the lateral parterre. The Villa's private quarters are in the first-floor gallery around the central atrium. To the left, with a slight difference of floor levels, there is a dining room that overlooks the garden and a billiards room, on the other side, that looks over the street. There is a wrought iron gate designed by Edgar Brandt which separates this social zone from the Villa's private quarters on the first floor and also the library and service areas on the ground floor.

=== Interior architecture ===
The Villa's interior architecture and decoration perhaps make it the most notable example of Art Deco style in Portugal. This was a comparatively late intervention, in comparison with the majority of Art Deco buildings in Europe - explained by the many visits and contacts made by the owner and also the delays that occurred in the construction of the building itself. The 2nd Count of Vizela first became acquainted with the canons of this style in France, where he lived, and he visited the leading Art deco exhibition held in Paris in 1925. He then invited some of the leading figures from the international artistic panorama of that time to work on the project. Émile-Jacques Ruhlman designed the dining room, hall, salon, cloakroom and billiard room. Alfred Porteneuve, who worked in the same atelier, endowed Serralves with its charismatic pink colouring. René Lalique designed the large skylight of the main hall's ceiling, on the first floor.

=== Furniture ===
The Foundation's current collection of furniture only includes a small part of the Villa's original furniture, given that many of these items were sold at auctions and thus dispersed, prior to the acquisition of the property by the Portuguese State. The main exceptions are the dining-room furniture (repurchased by the Foundation) and the interior architecture equipment (doors, embedded cupboards, doorknobs, bathroom furniture, etc.). During the restoration process of the Villa, overseen by the architect Álvaro Siza, the latter items were preserved with great care. Part of the Villa's furniture was acquired from leading interior decorators of the period. Several items were brought from the Count's residence in Biarritz. He also added antiques, which he inherited from the family, thus creating an overall eclectic style. Ruhlmann and Leleu design several items of furniture and Silva Bruhns designed the carpets. Edgar Brandt designed a wrought iron gate of the hall and several wall lamps. Jean Perzel designed the lamps. Other refined aspects of the Villa's interior decoration include the blue limestone and exotic hardwood floors; the marble-lined bathrooms, with stone-carved bathtubs; the geometric patterns of the plasterwork; and the curved form of the library staircase.

=== Chapel ===
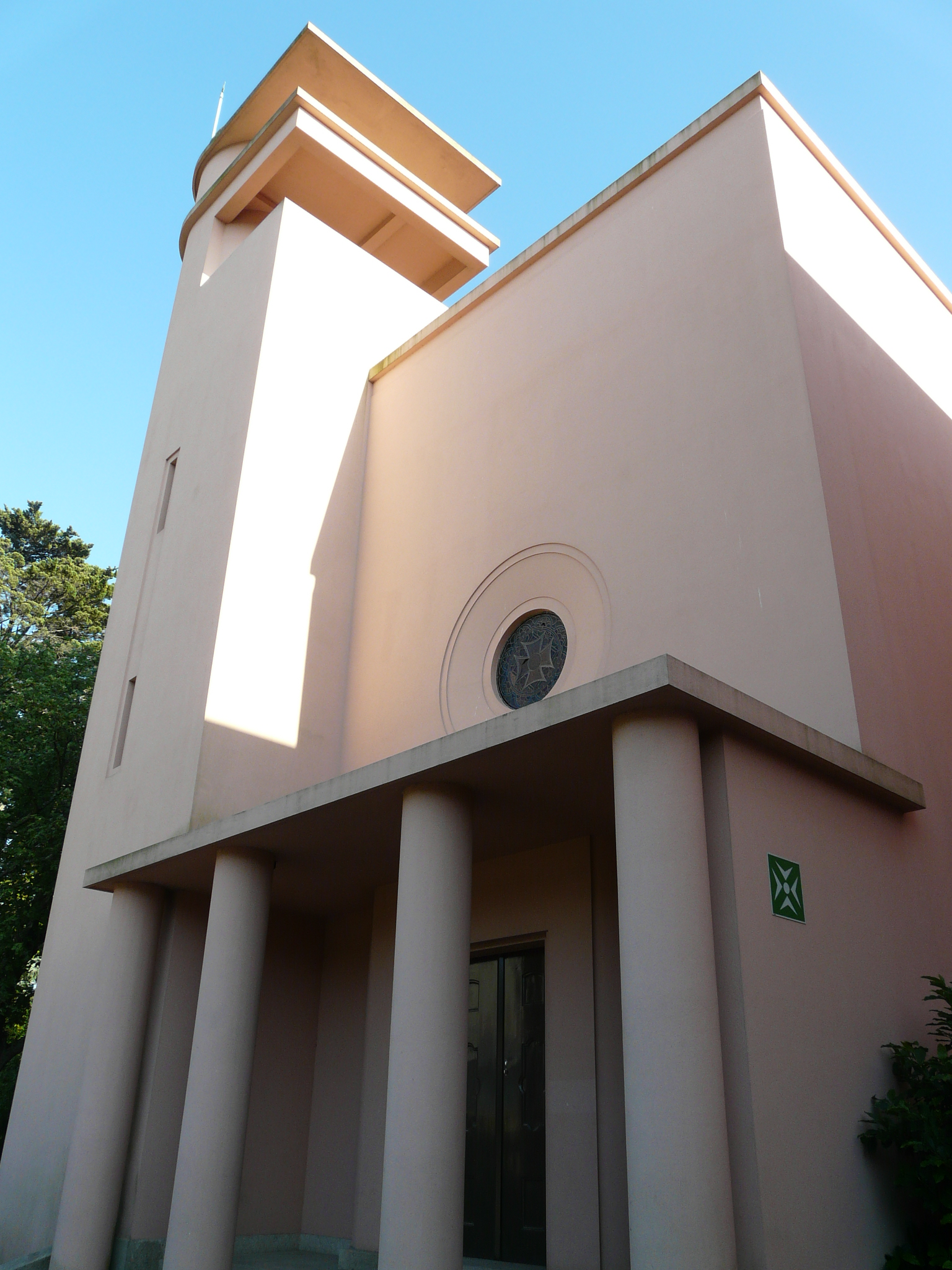
Casa de Serralves - Chapel

The chapel was given a new exterior covering that ensured that it would be visually integrated within the overall building. The chapel itself dates from the 19th century. One of the family heirs, Mário Cabral, remembered that the owner wanted to preserve the chapel: “The chapel wasn’t demolished; it was integrated within the overall construction. The part of the building including the chapel was built upon the pre-existing construction. The chapel was inserted within the overall design, but preserved in its original form; as a 19th-century chapel. The chapel was used regularly in the local neighbourhood. The locals came to mass here and I think this influenced him and therefore he didn’t want to demolish it. That was a general idea shared between him and all the architects working with him... one of the amusing aspects was the manner in which they made the cross; the cross was essentially designed by Ruhlman...... which is quite amazing.”

== Park ==
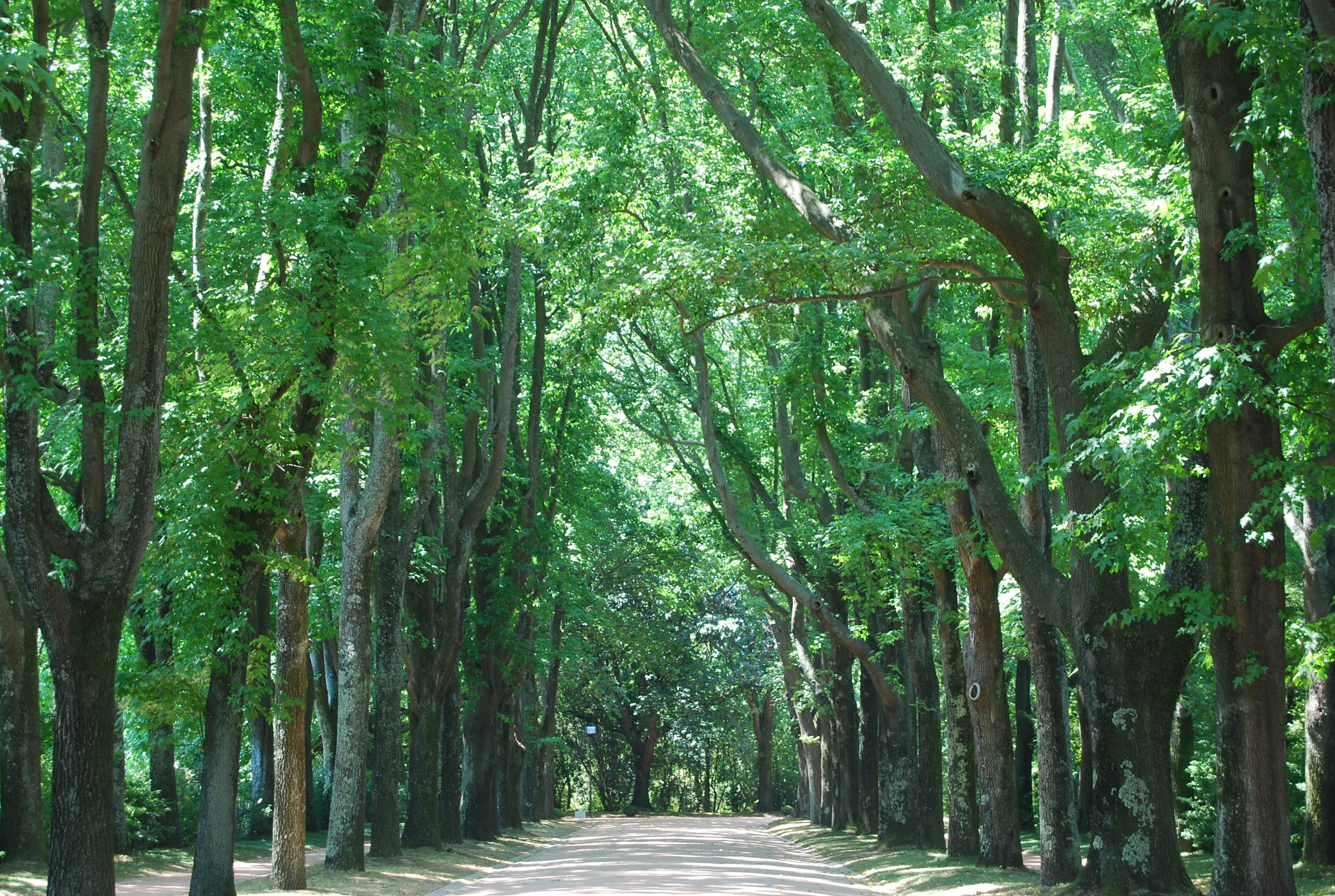
Liquidambar Lane

The landscaped gardens designed by João Gomes da Silva, on approximately 18 hectares of land, preserved the most important species already existing on the site. The new Serralves Park opened to the public in 1987 and was subject to a recovery and enhancement project initiated in 2001 and concluded in 2006. Currently on display in the park are sculptures by Claes Oldenburg, Dan Graham, Fernanda Gomes, Richard Serra, and Veit Stratmann.

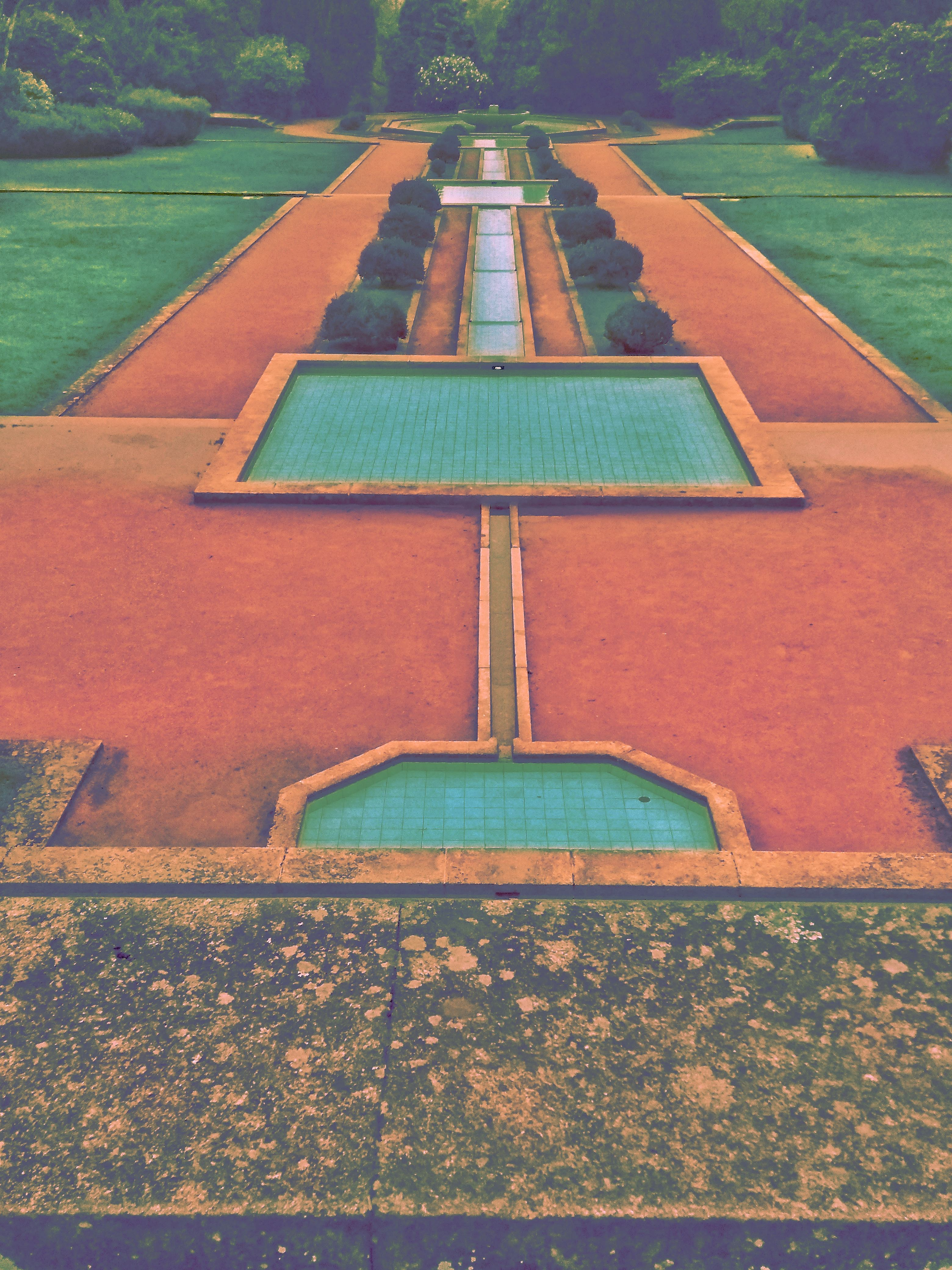
Garden Fountains in Serralves

Located at one of the highest points of the property, the Villa (Casa de Serralves) presides over the Park, which opens out in front of it and on either side. From its implantation site, it traces a long longitudinal axis - which extends to the pool at the other end of the property. In front of the villa, the central parterre establishes an element of continuity between the building's geometric lines and the sobriety of its overall design. A second, shorter axis – marked by the long Sweetgum Alley - is designed at a right angle to the central axis defined by the Central Parterre. The alley leads into an octagonal clearing which faces the street and the main entrance to the property. Looking back one can imagine the visitor's trajectory, from the street towards the building. On the western side of the building, the large door/window of the ground floor salon opens onto the lateral parterre, suggesting continuity between the interior and exterior spaces. Through the huge windows, the garden is an omnipresent feature of the villa (Casa de Serralves) on the ground floor, while the first-floor windows offer panoramic views over the park, enabling a better understanding of the spaces and their inter-relations.

The implantation of the building observes an approximate southwest-southeast orientation in profound articulation with the garden. From the garden which circulates around the Villa from behind, visitors can observe the extensive facade, which looks out over the Rua de Serralves. The main entrance is formed by a semicircular widening of the exterior wall, framed beneath a glass canopy. There is also a side entrance via a patio encased between the main building and the chapel. From the street, the building has a relatively closed appearance to the exterior. By contrast, the facade overlooking the garden includes wide or long rectangular windows that accompany the rhythm of the sober lines of geometry that define the building's overall form and volumetry. Viewed as a whole, the Villa is a testimony to the art deco style, which came into vogue with the 1925 International Exhibition of Modern Decorative and Industrial Arts in Paris.

=== Quinta de Serralves ===
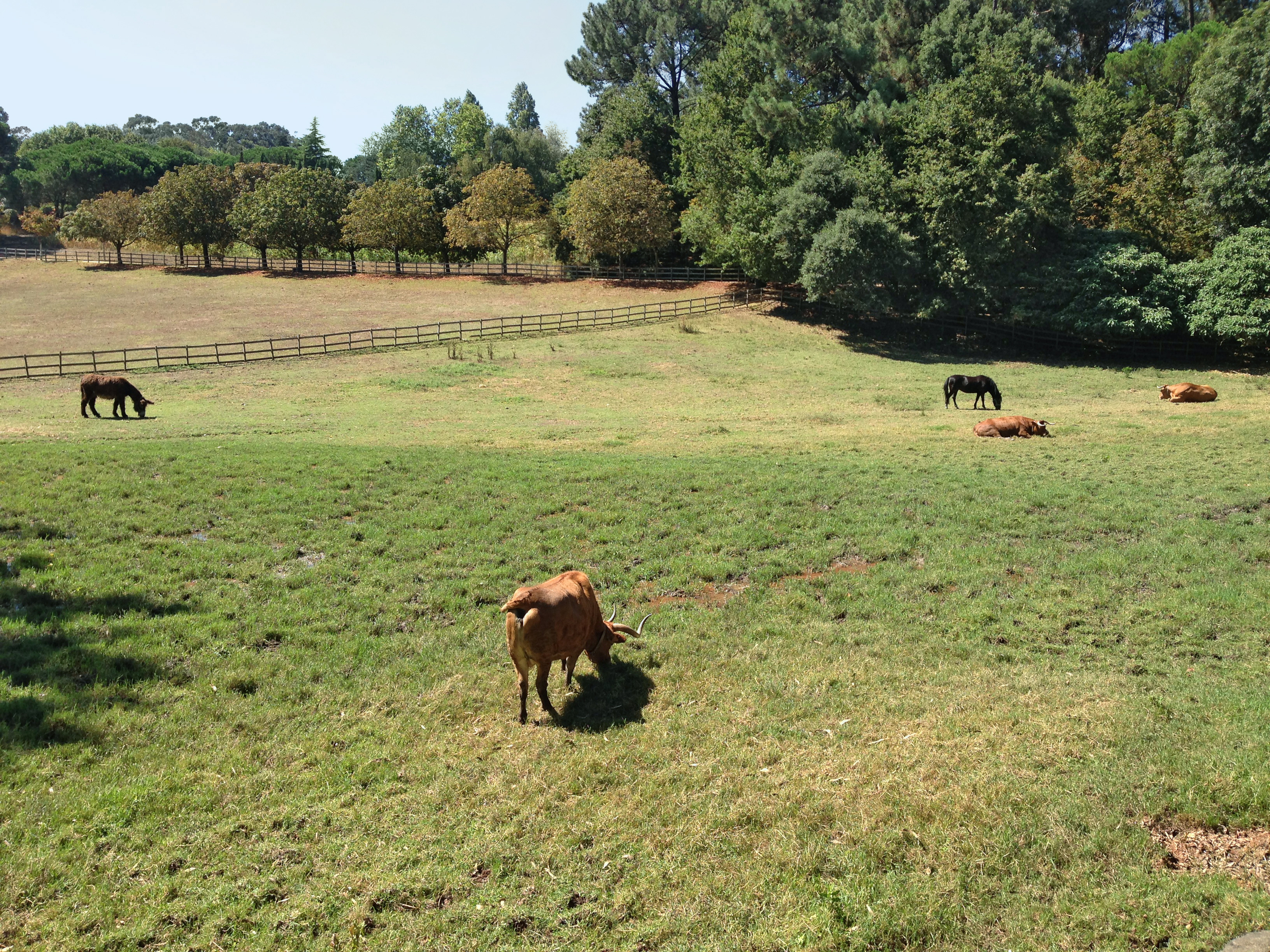
Quinta de Serralves

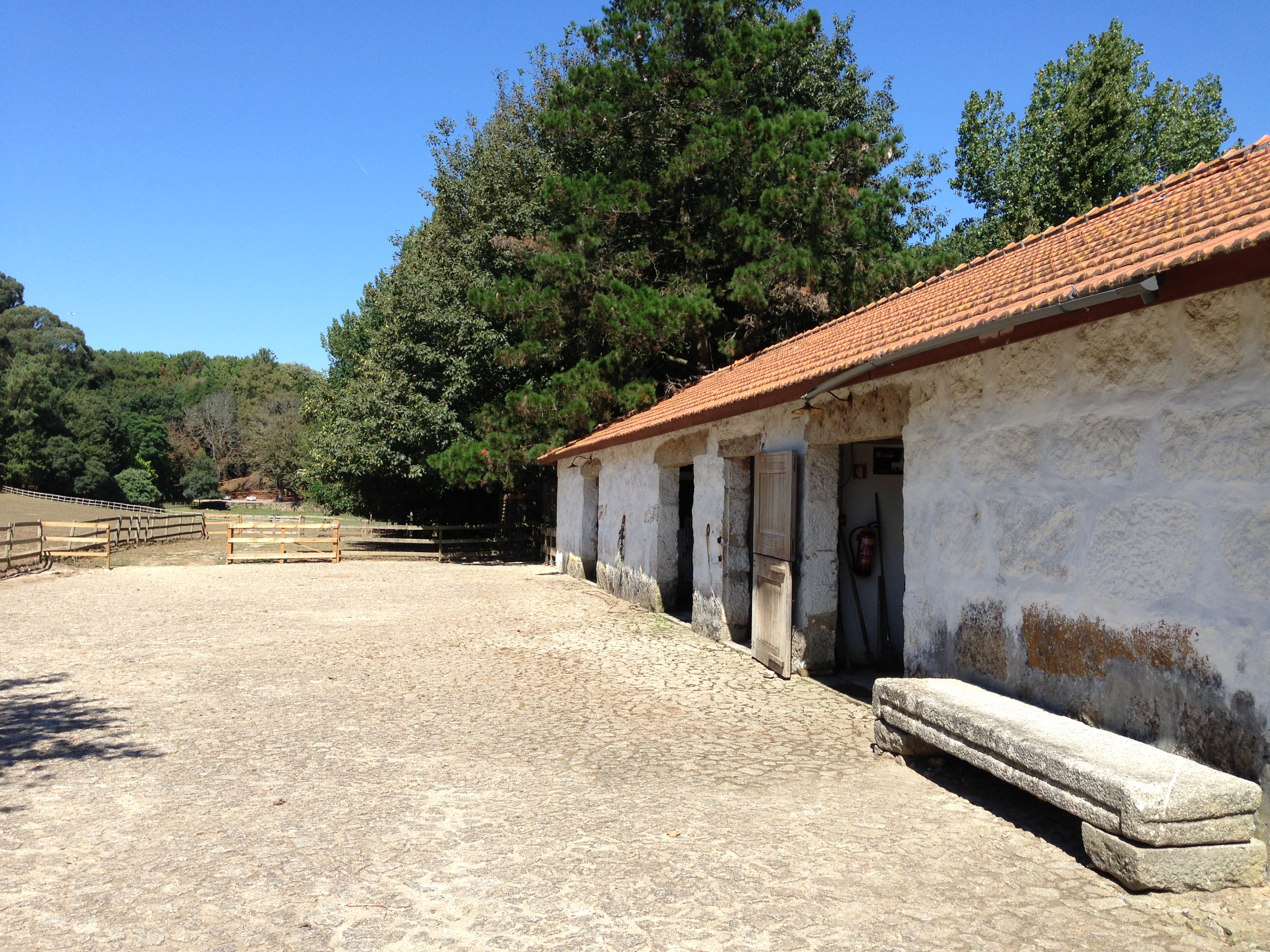
Serralves Barn

Quinta de Serralves (Serralves Farm) was originally referred to as Mata-Sete farm. It pertained to the Cabral family prior to 1932, and although excluded from Jacques Gréber's project for the Count of Vizela, it was subsequently subject to an intervention by Gréber.

A long avenue of horse-chestnut trees cuts across the farming and pasture land, designing the axis that formally prolongs the Central Parterre to the estate's southern extremity and culminating in one large pool, removed in the 1980s, which stylistically matched the pools in the Northern limit.

Originally interspersed by cypresses and demarcated by hedges, this avenue prolongs the garden, cutting into a landscape that is codified by picturesque and bucolic principles of staged rurality, apparent in the buildings included within the centre of the farm, designed by the architect Marques da Silva in the 1940s on a set of existing rural buildings (The Barn and the Olive Press)

Today the farm performs a pedagogical function, in particular for maintenance of effective livestock breeding, composed by indigenous species from Northern and Central Portugal, including Barrosã, Arouquesa and Marinhoa cow breeds and the donkey breed Asinina de Miranda.

Several artworks can be found within the area of the Quinta such as Maria Nordman intervention: For a New City.

== Collection highlights ==
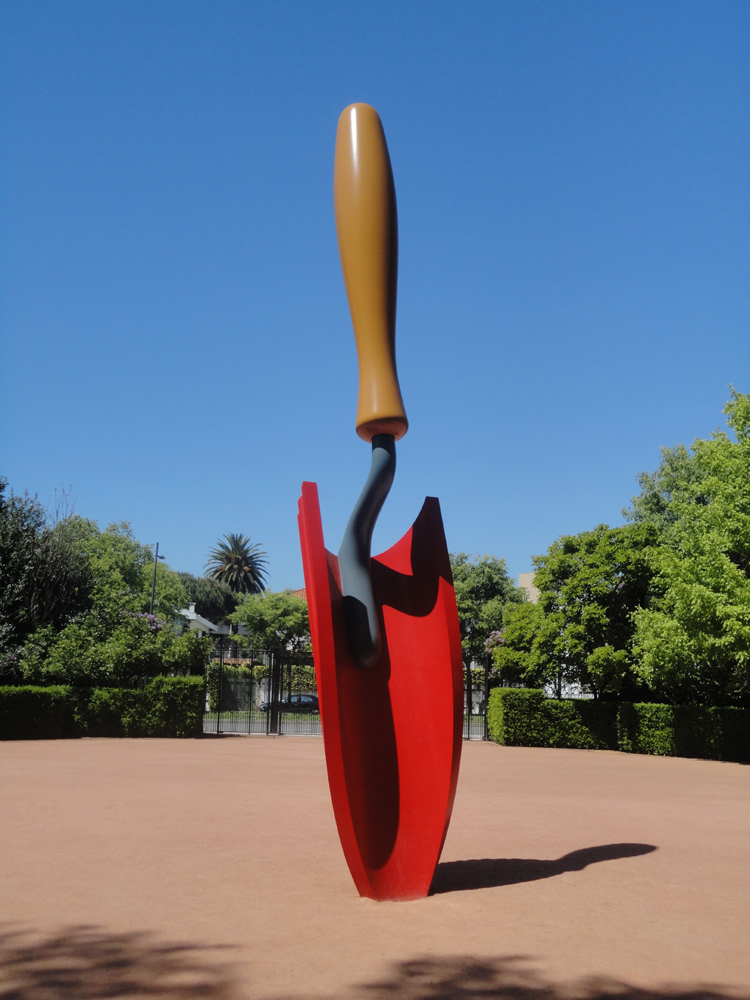
Claes Oldenburg & Coosje van Bruggen, Plantoir (2001)

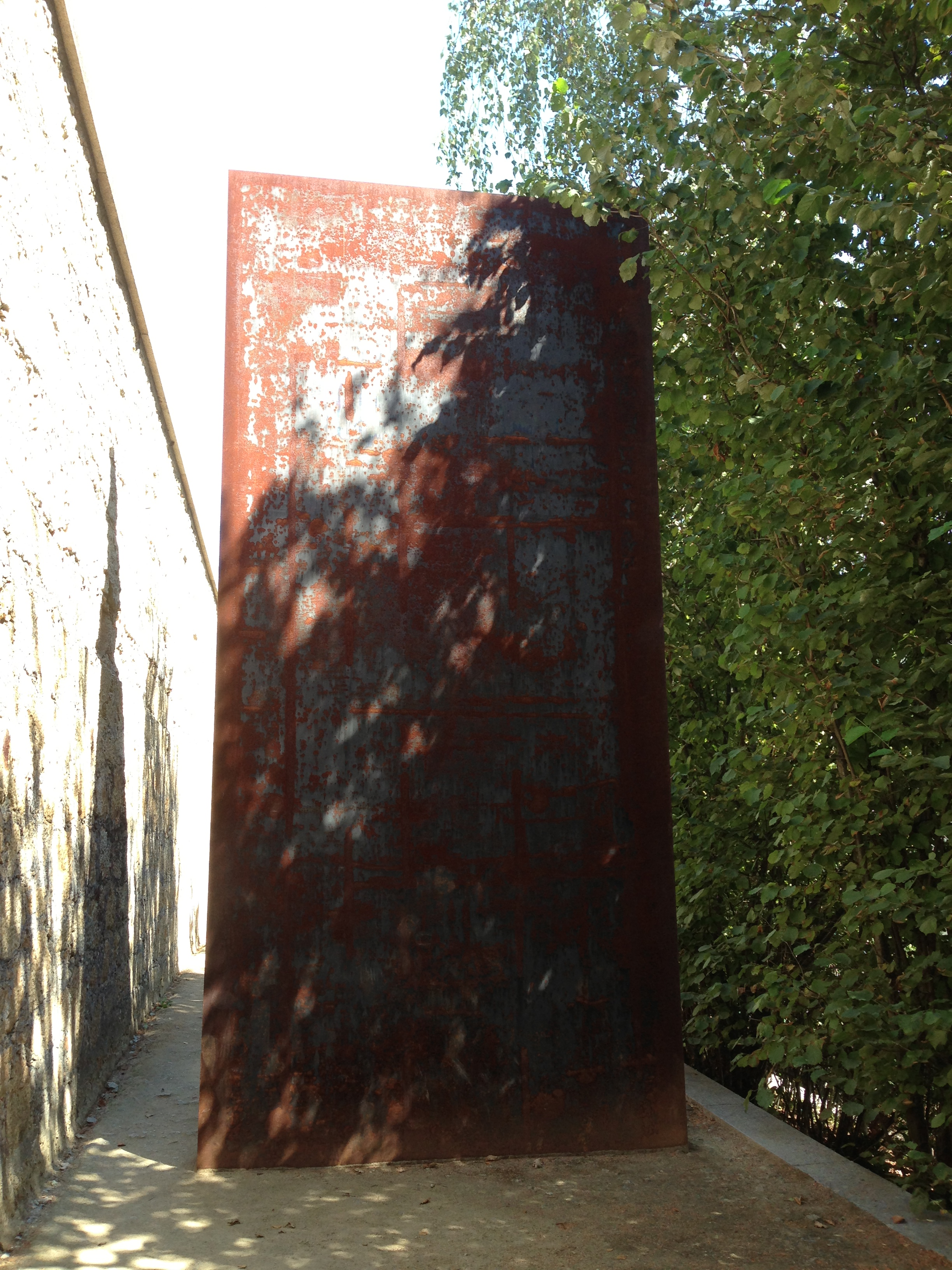
Richard Serra,
Walking is measuring

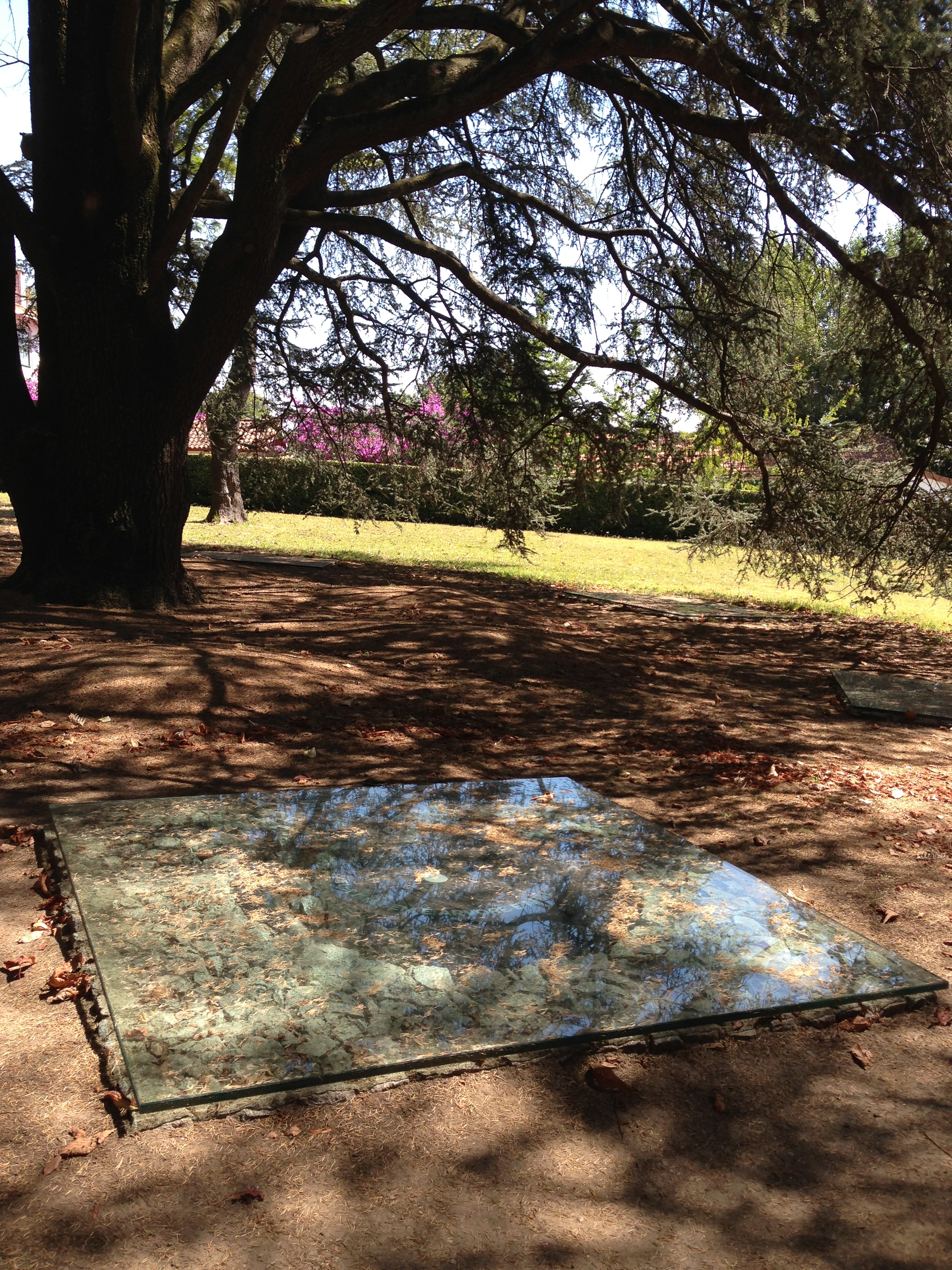
Alberto Carneiro,
Ser Arvore e Arte

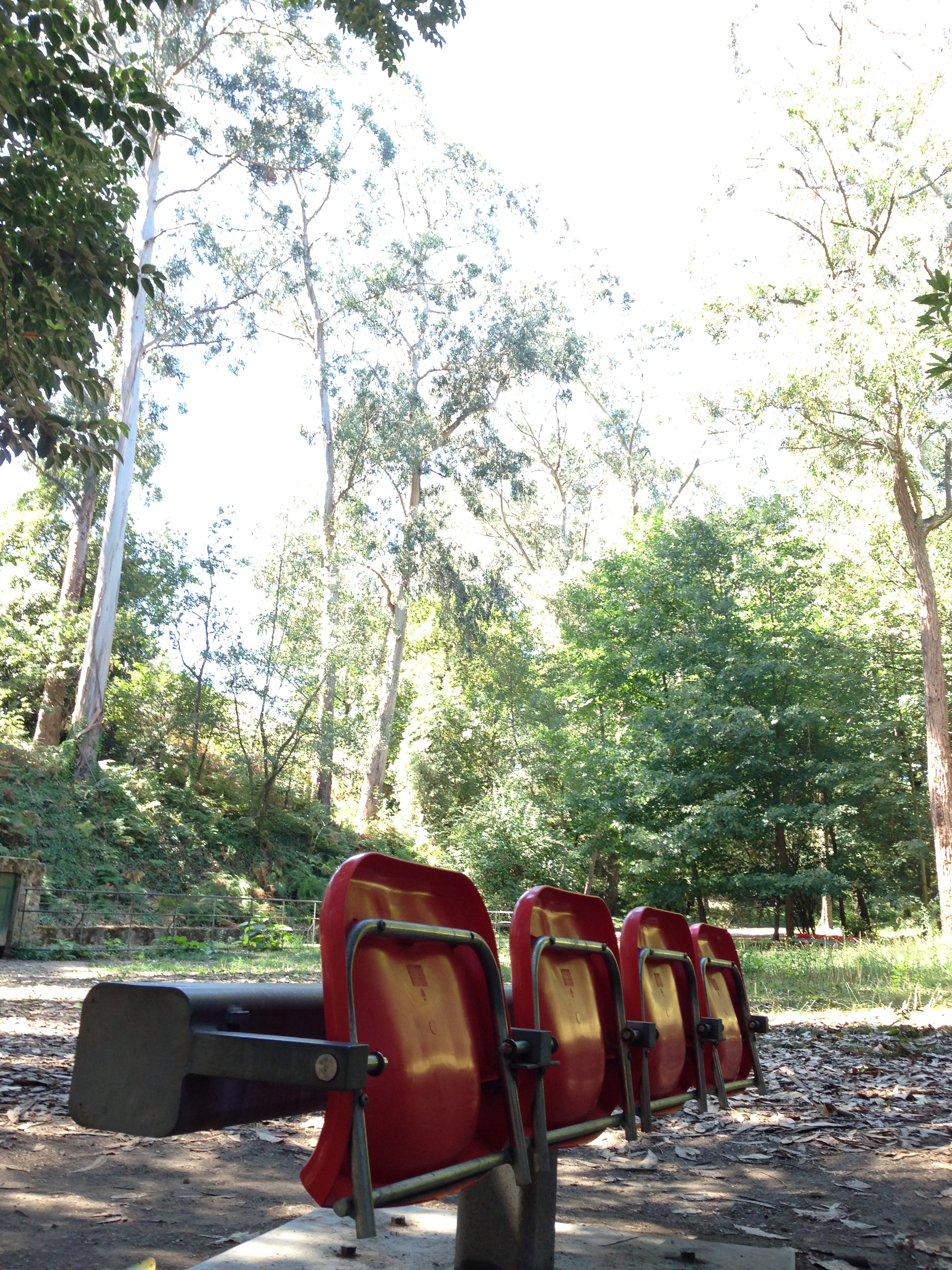
Veit Stratmann,
Pour le Parc

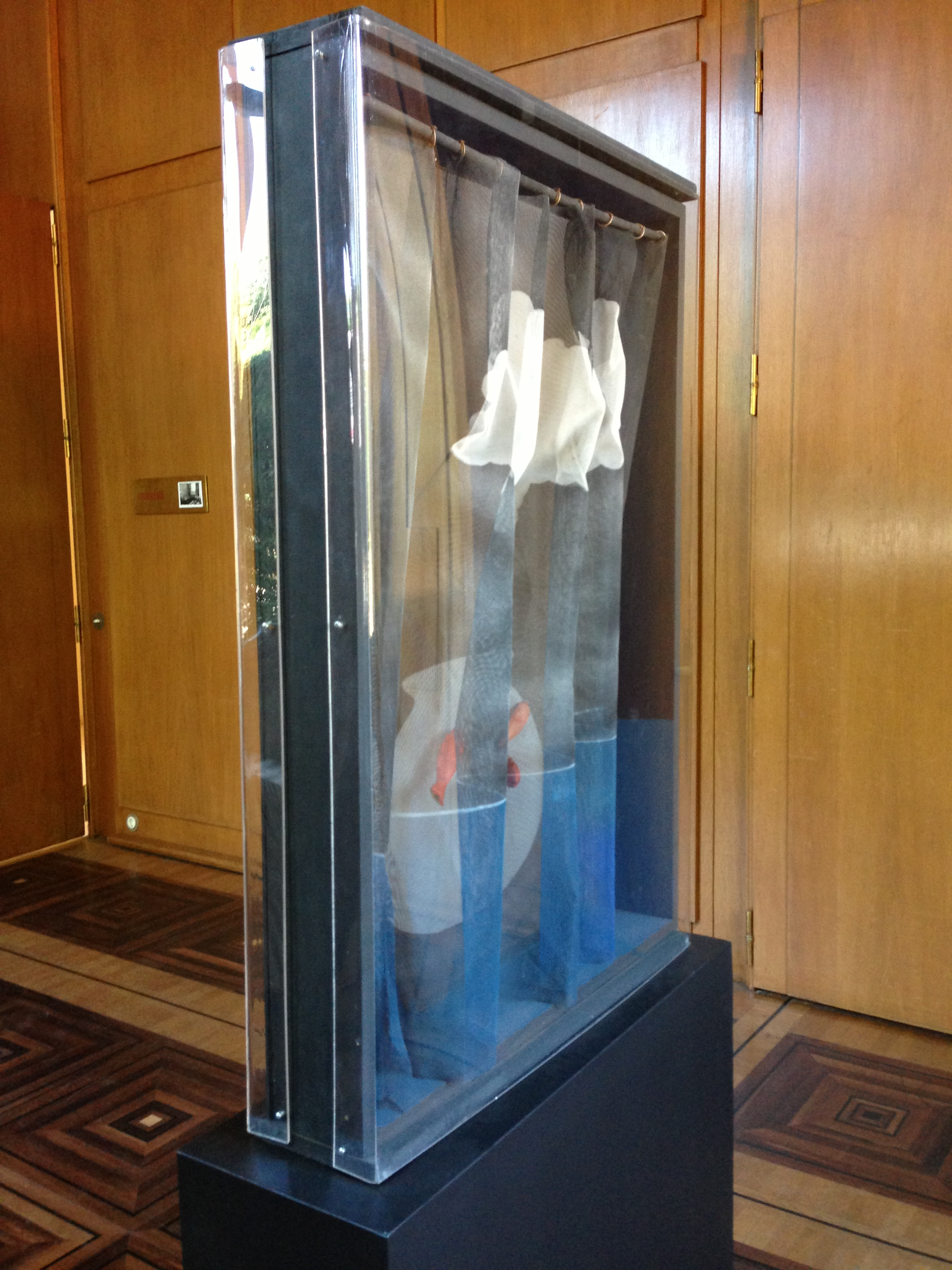
Ana Vieira,
Aquario

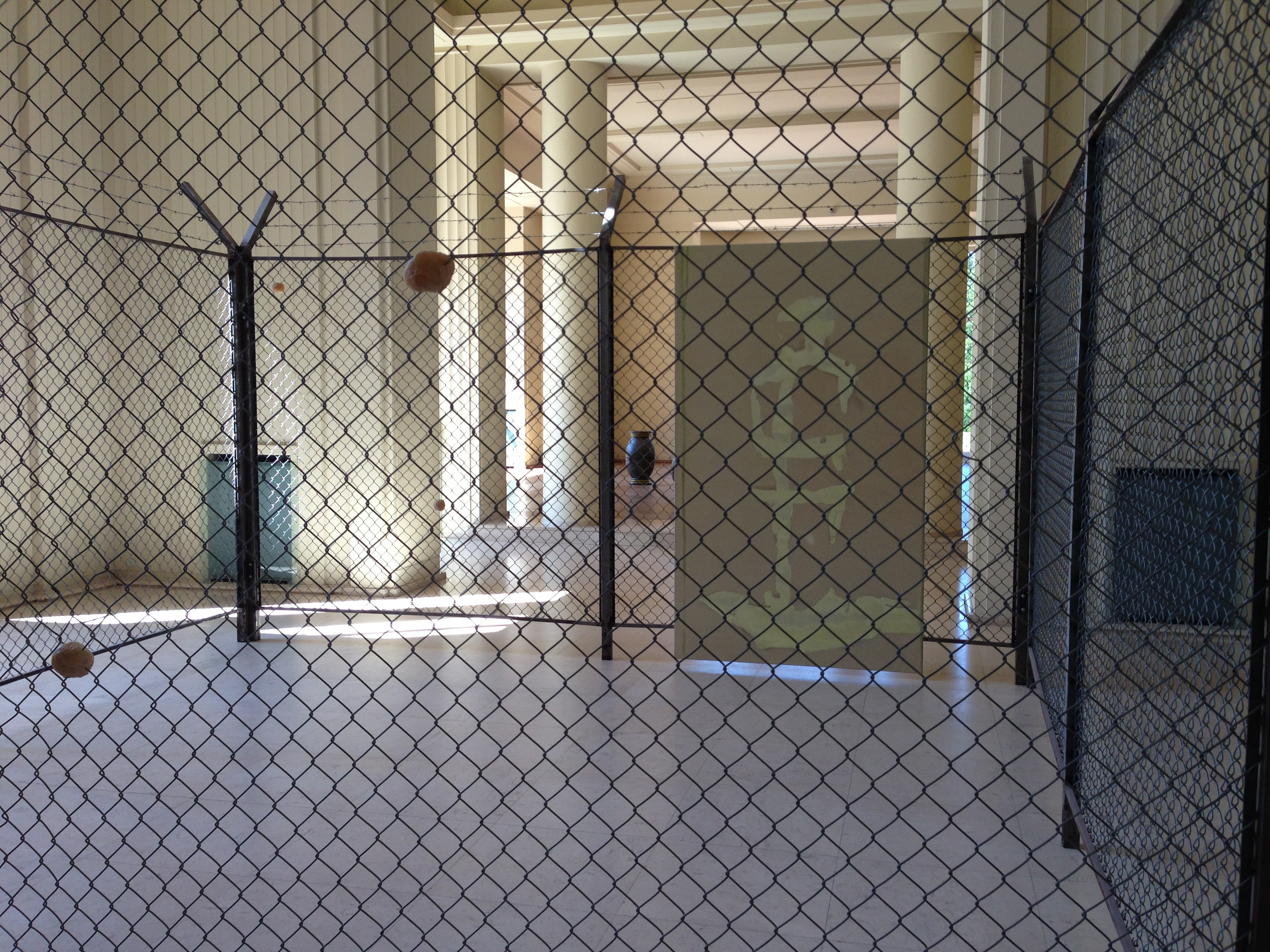
Luc Tuymans,
The Fence

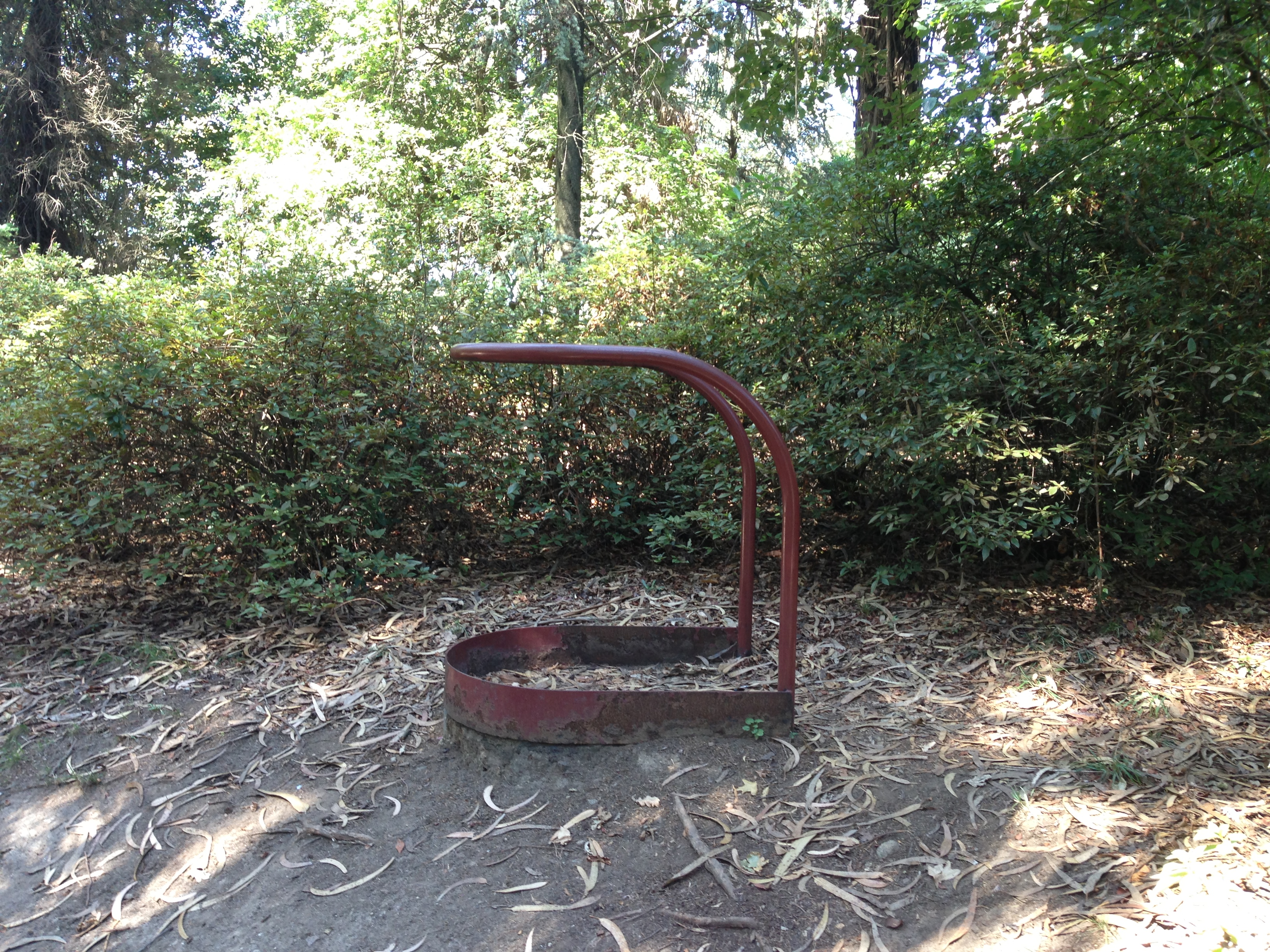
Veit Stratmann,
Elements pour Porto

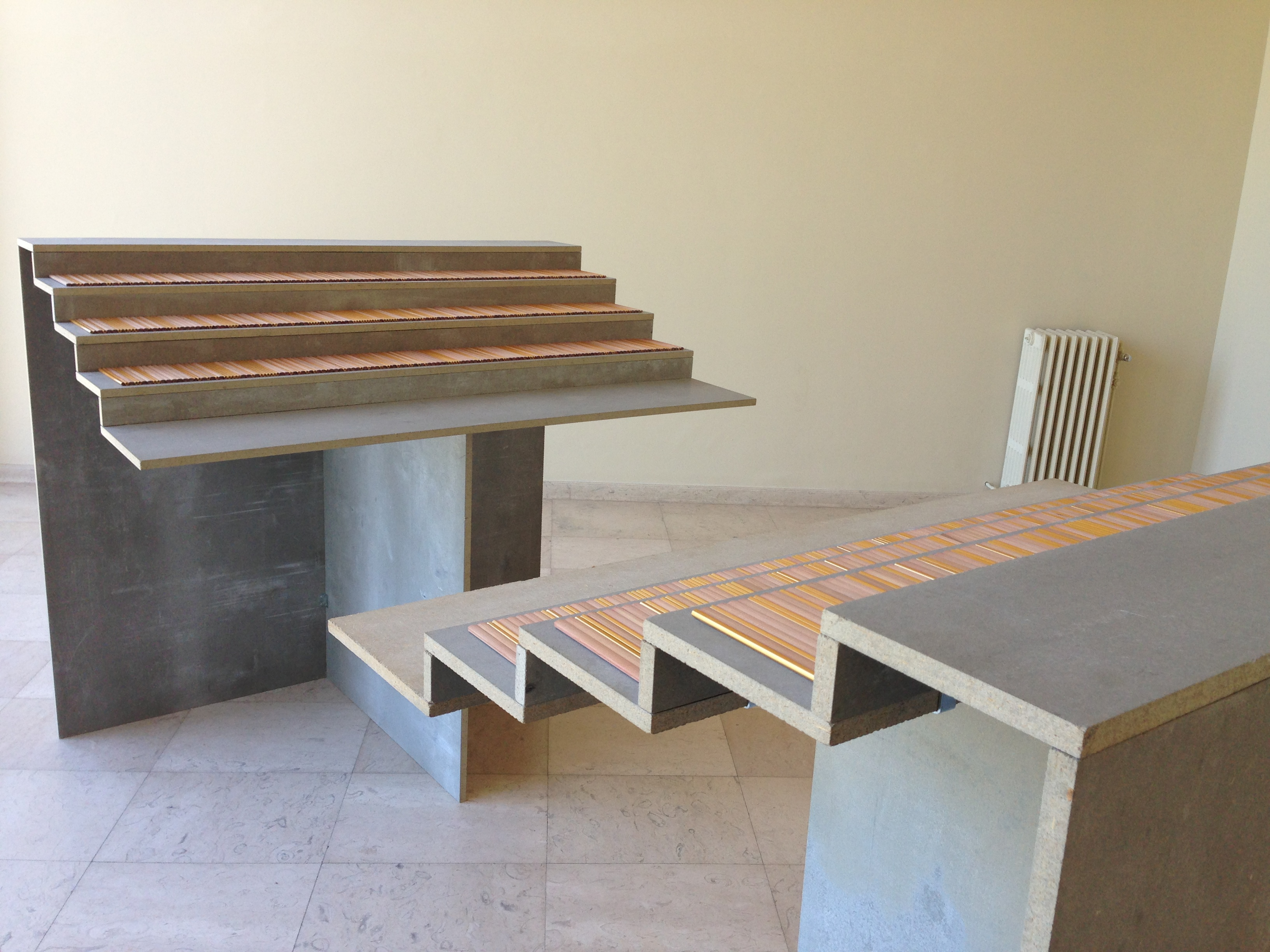
Pedro Barateiro,
Tratado de encenação

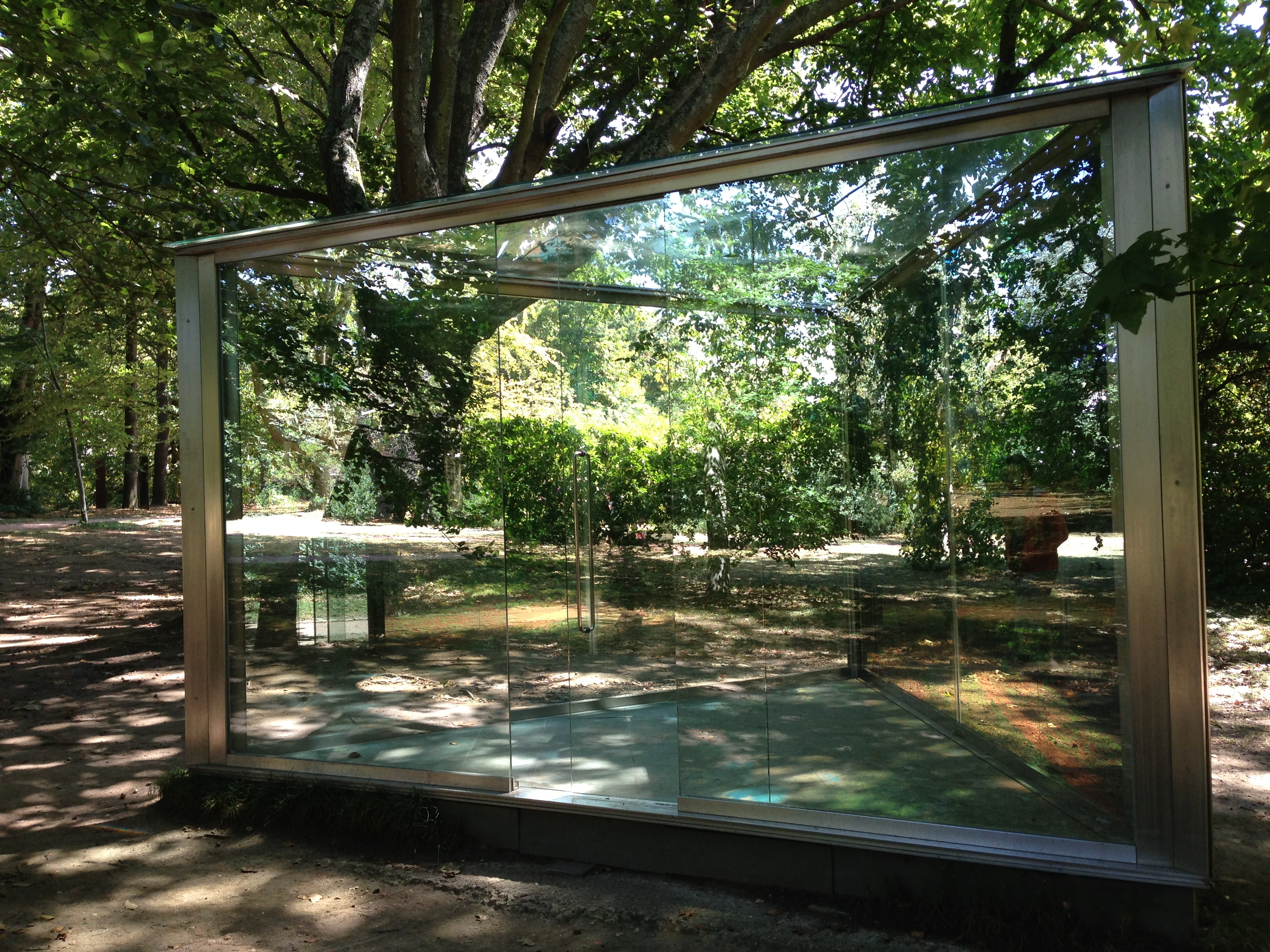
Dan Graham,
Double Exposure

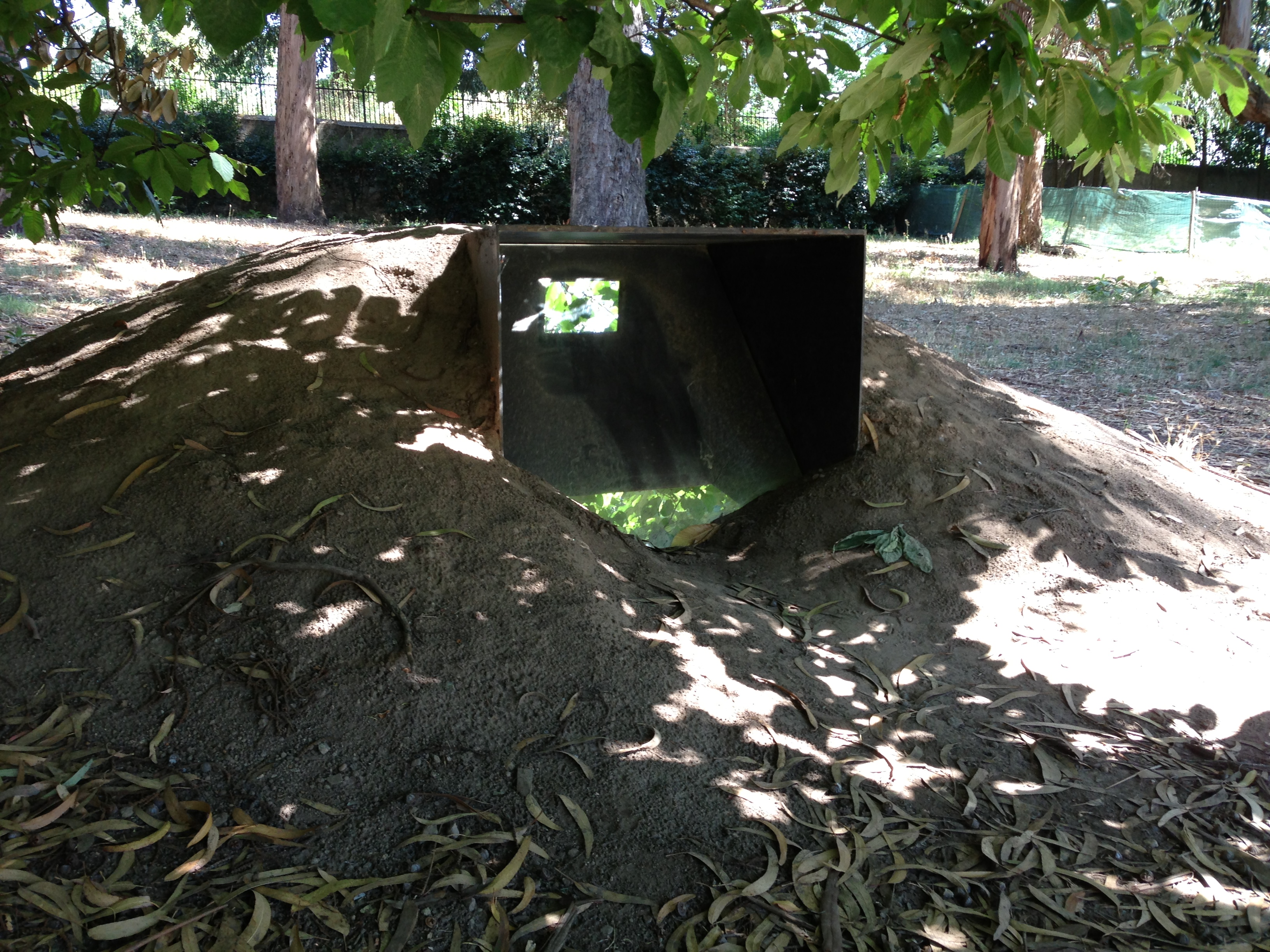
Francisco Tropa,
Monte Falso

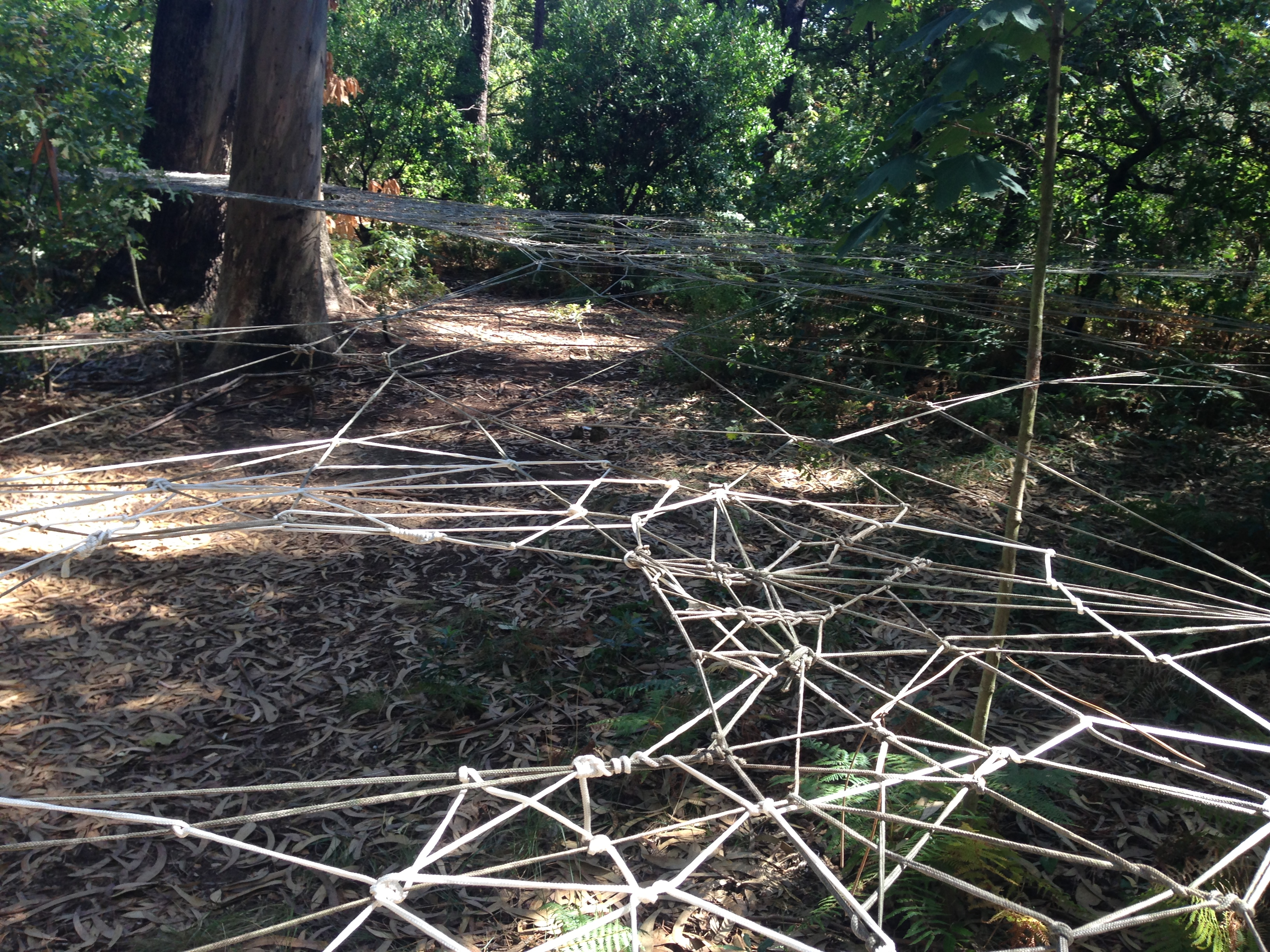
Fernanda Gomes,
Sem Título

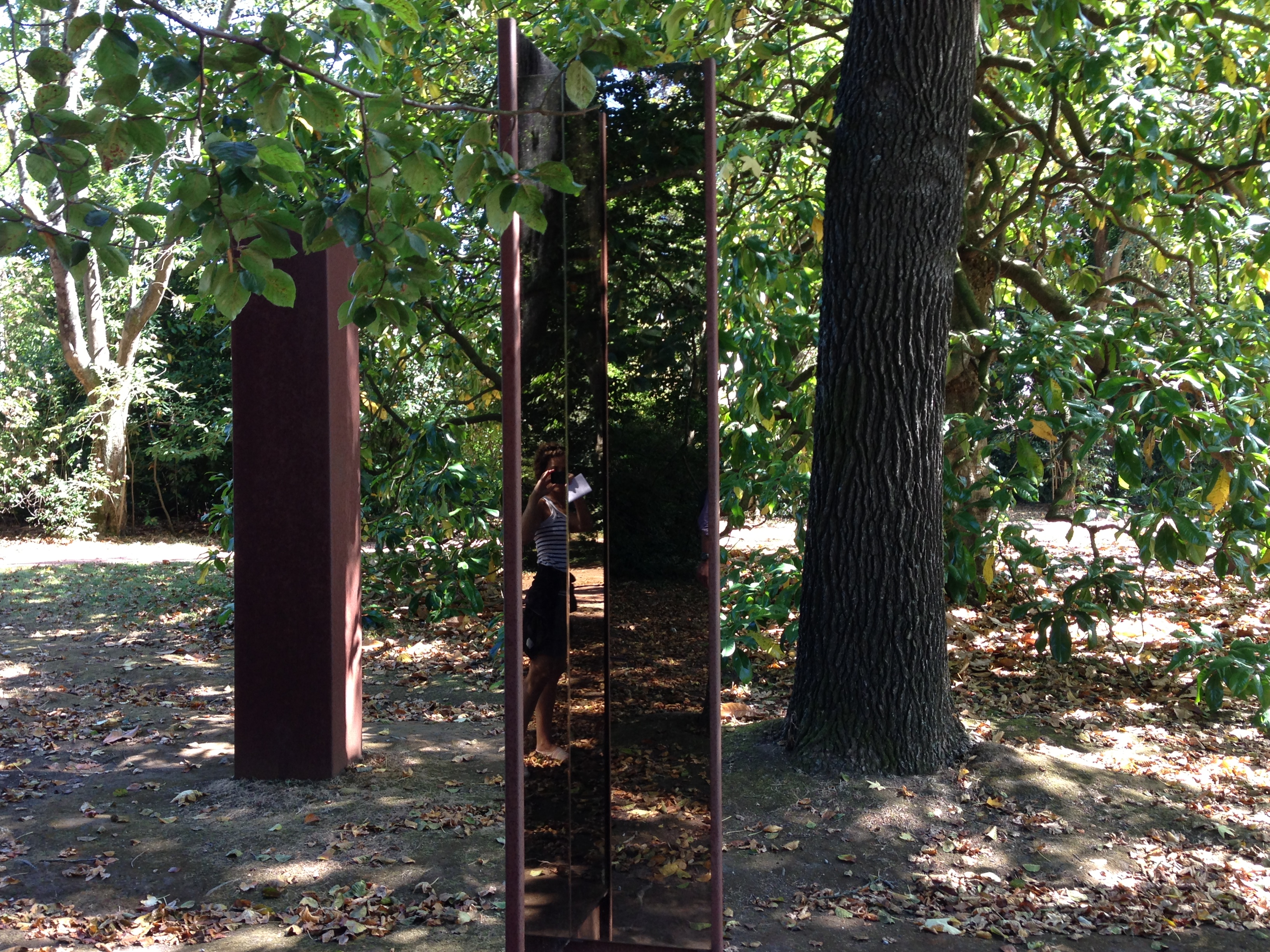
Ângelo de Sousa,
Um Jardim Catoptrico

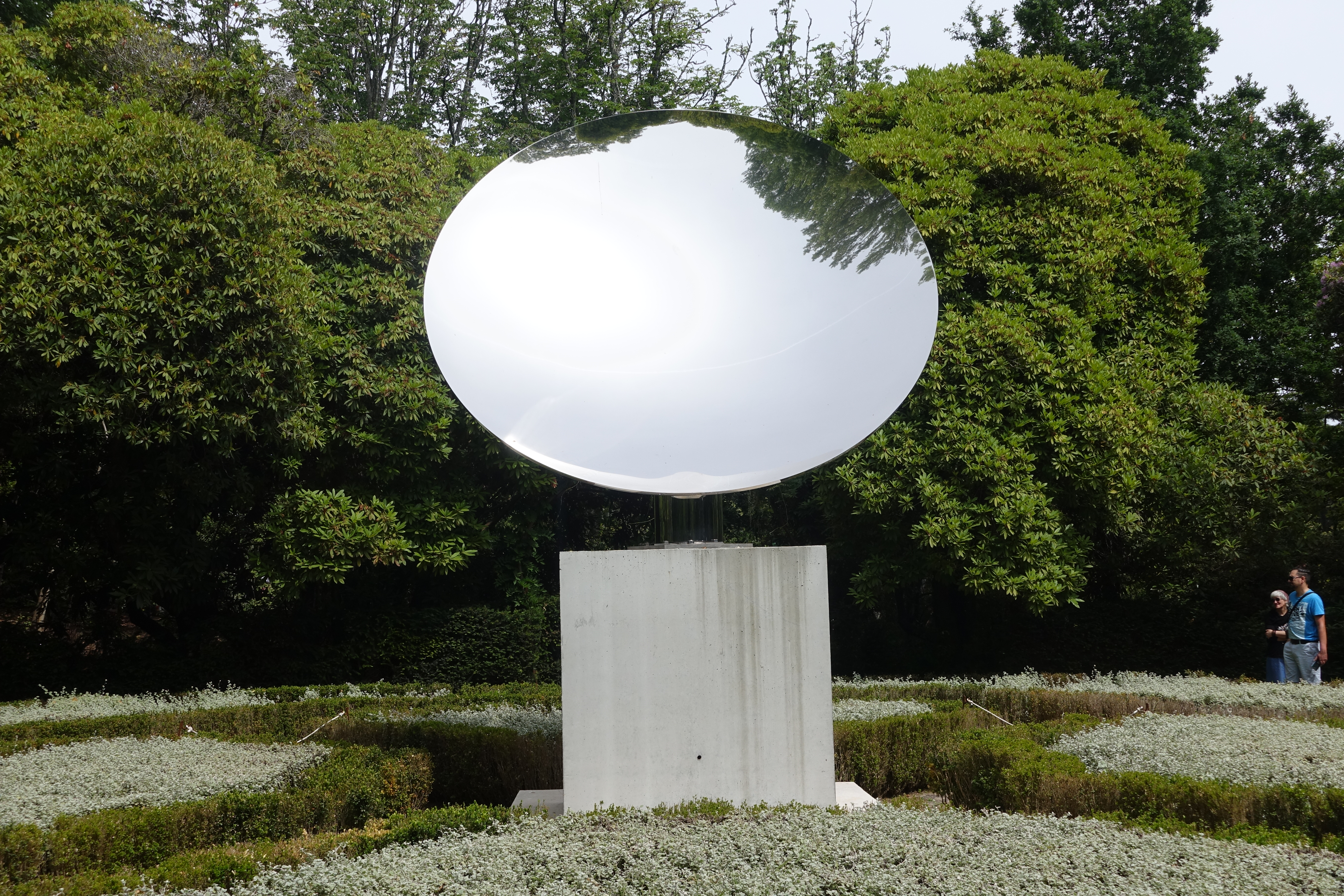
Anish Kapoor,
Sky Mirror

== Serralves em Festa ==
Serralves em Festa is a festival covering contemporary arts and family-oriented activities including exhibitions, performances, music concerts, dance, theater, circus shows and fairs. It is a free entrance cultural event celebrated each year during the last weekend of May on a 40-hour non-stop basis. Its first edition was celebrated in 2004. Since then, it reached an attendance of 103,000 visitors in 2010.
