= Frederick Joss =

Frederick Joss (née Fritz Josefovics; 15 November 1908 – 22 April 1967) was a political caricaturist, satirist, cartoonist, author and adventurer. He was elected a Fellow of the Royal Society of Arts and also awarded the French Officer of the Légion of Honneur.

== Biography ==
=== Early years ===
Frederick Joss was born in Vienna as Fritz Josefovics to Adolf and Fanny. He studied at the renowned Arts & Crafts School of the Austrian State Museum in Vienna. His elder brother Carl was a fellow student. He travelled widely in his youth, through Denmark, the Netherlands, Spain, Turkey and Scandinavia. Aged 19, he became editor and cartoonist of a local newspaper in Rio de Janeiro, Jornal do Brasil. Joss was expelled from Argentina for his socialist views and also spent a short spell in a Spanish prison. By 1932 at the age of 25, he had returned to Vienna and was publishing Wiener Post.

== Family ==
Joss had two daughters with Clara: Barbara, born 1937, and Lisa, born 1942. Joss's brother, Carl Josefovics, was a stage set designer.

== England and "Joss of The Star" ==
In 1933 Joss arrived in England, along with many other important figures of the time including fellow Jew, Albert Einstein. He was shortly followed by his wife Clara, who also studied at the university in Vienna. In 1934 Joss secured himself a job as a cartoonist and current affairs caricaturist for The Star, one of London's three evening newspapers. He became known as "Joss of The Star" and officially changed his name from Fritz Josefovics to Frederick Joss in 1940. He built up a keen following over the subsequent 21 years. His Daily Round by Joss (topical cartoons in large format) and his Lightning Sketches (sketches and commentaries on VIPs) were popular features. He was also sent to cover European political meetings and conferences, particularly in Geneva, and his pen portraits of key players regularly landed on the front page.

In 1938 he wrote a novel entitled Amateurs in Arms, which he published under the pen name of FJ Joseph. The same year he illustrated a publication entitled Blackmail or War by Genevieve Tabouis. He also worked during this period for British Intelligence, simultaneously translating Hitler's broadcasts.

== World War II and "Denim" ==
With the outbreak of World War Two, a new persona was born. Joss joined the army in 1942, serving as a gunner in the Royal Artillery. Out of the transformation from Joss to Gunner Joss, "Denim", a new pseudonym was born. The Star's Daily Round by Denim took on the form of small pocket-sized cartoons on sheets of airmail paper drawn with a fountain pen and blue pencil, which he carried in the field-dressing packet of his denims.

== Post-War, the Cold War and the UN ==
On his return from active service, "Joss of the Star" resumed once more, and an additional Saturday strip of five cartoons entitled Round Up also appeared which was a comical comment on the news of the week. Annual Joss cartoon booklets were published in a similar format to those for Denim, containing 200 cartoons; the pick of each year.

Joss was frequently asked to cover delegations for the Cold War and the UN, including the post war peace conference chaired by Eleanor Roosevelt. The Star continued to send him to Geneva, Paris and elsewhere to record the figures at the top-flight political meetings of the day.

The Star also sent Joss all over the British Isles to report back. This included series of drawings from particular towns, royal garden parties and sporting events such as Wimbledon.

== Moving in artistic circles ==
Alongside Joss, other strong artists were emerging at The Star. Leslie Grimes, was one of these names. Other artists included Wyndham Robinson, also a political cartoonist, and Roy Ullyet (d. 2001,) a sports cartoonist and commentator, with whom Joss shared a studio. Joss also mixed with many other artists in different circles, beyond that of the newspaper, and he enjoyed long friendships with Oscar Kokoschka and the cartoonist Vicky (Victor Weisz). Joss often attended theatre opening nights and film premiers in his role as "Joss of The Star" and produced many caricatures of famous actors of the day. This extended to directors, musicians, singers and writers too. His caricature of Vivien Leigh in costume ran on the front page heralding her discovery in the play. He was also there to record the first black dance company in Europe, Les Ballets Nègres, formed in 1946.

== Travels abroad ==
Travel was a constant in Joss's life and he enjoyed all modes of transport – jets, cargo ships, trains, ponies and often on foot. He produced many pen and brush "travelogues" of lands and peoples. In the 1950s, he travelled to India, sketching political figures as well as common people, and on his return exhibited his work at the Leger Galleries (where he had previously shown with the cartoonist Ronald Searle) as well as regularly filing reports for ArtReview magazine, then titled Art News and Review. When in India, Joss also met Abu Abrahim, who later came to London to work for The Observer and The Guardian for several years as a cartoonist.

== Later years ==
Joss left The Star in 1955 and worked as a freelance artist. He suffered a period of severe depression and hospitalisation, during which his wife, Clara, died. Following his incarceration, Joss left England for the Far East. In Japan he began to draw and paint again in the area he referred to as "the sacred hills of Kyoto". On his travels to Korea he met and married a young Korean teacher, Jin Song, and had a daughter.

Joss died on 22 April 1967, aged 58, falling from one of the highest floors of the Hong Kong Hilton, then the site of the Foreign Correspondents Club.
