= Pedro Barateiro =

Portuguese artist (born 1979)

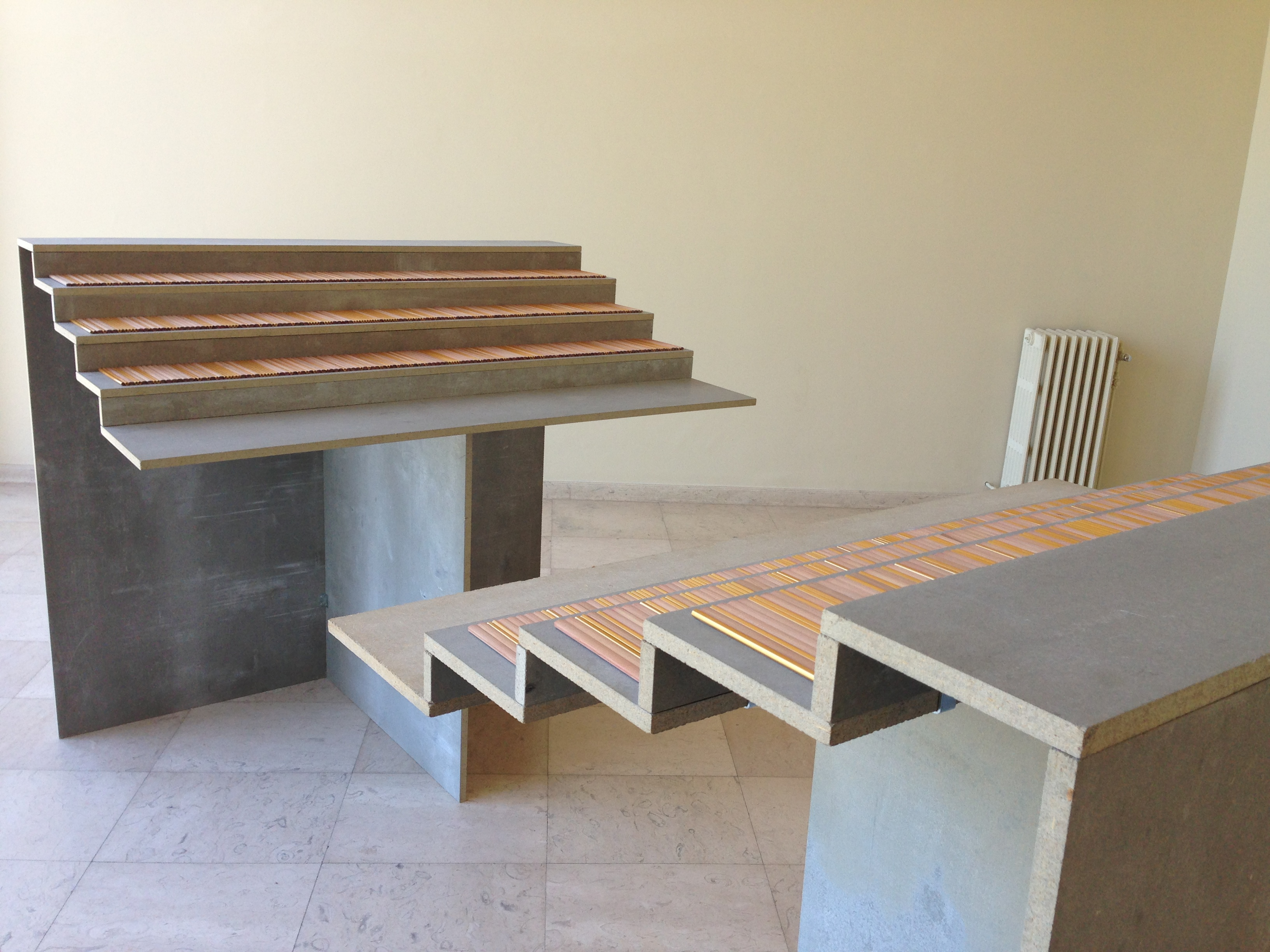
Tratado de encenaçao (Pedro Barateiro, Serralves)

Pedro Barateiro is a Portuguese artist. He was born in Almada (Portugal) in 1979 and lives and works in Lisbon. Barateiro studied at Maumaus in Lisbon and got the MFA in Malmö Art Academy in Malmö, Sweden. He was in residence at the Pavilion - Palais de Tokyo in Paris (2008–09) and was a scholarship from the Calouste Gulbenkian Foundation in ISCP - International Studio and Curatorial Program in New York (2007–08). He also was invited for a residency of four months (Nov 2012 - May 2013) by the AIR Antwerpen International Residence Project for Artists.

Pedro Barateiro’s first solo exhibition took place in 2003. Some of his one-person shows include Domingo (Sunday), at the Pavilhão Branco, Museu da Cidade, Lisbon, 2008; Speech Theory, Casa de Seralves, Serralves Foundation, Porto, 2009; Theatre of Hunters, Kunsthalle Basel, 2010; Today, Our Eyes are Closed, Kunsthalle Lissabon, Lisbon, 2010; and We Belong to Other People When We're Outside, Kettle's Yard, Cambridge, 2013.

His work has been featured in numerous group exhibitions that include Revolutions: Forms That Turn, 16th Sydney Biennial, and When Things Cast No Shadow, 5th Berlin Biennial, both in 2008; and Há sempre um copo de mar para um homem navegar, 29th São Paulo Biennial, 2010.

Barateiro co-edited ACTIVITY (JRP|Ringier) with the artist Ricardo Valentim in 2011. More recently, he edited the monograph How to Make a Mask, (Kunsthalle Lissabon/ Sternberg Press) in 2019, and Just a Wound (Documenta/ Mousse Publishing) in 2021.

His most recent works include exhibitions at Parkour, Lisbon (The Red Savages), Museu Berardo, in Lisbon, and participation at ARCO, Madrid in 2013.
