= Charles Siclis =

French architect

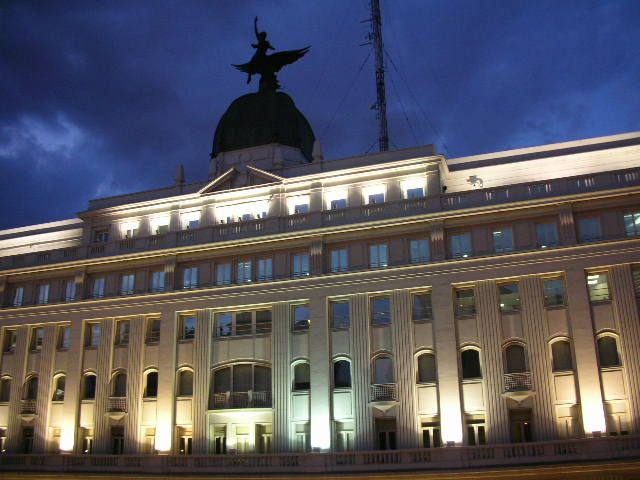
The building Paris-Madrid Madrid

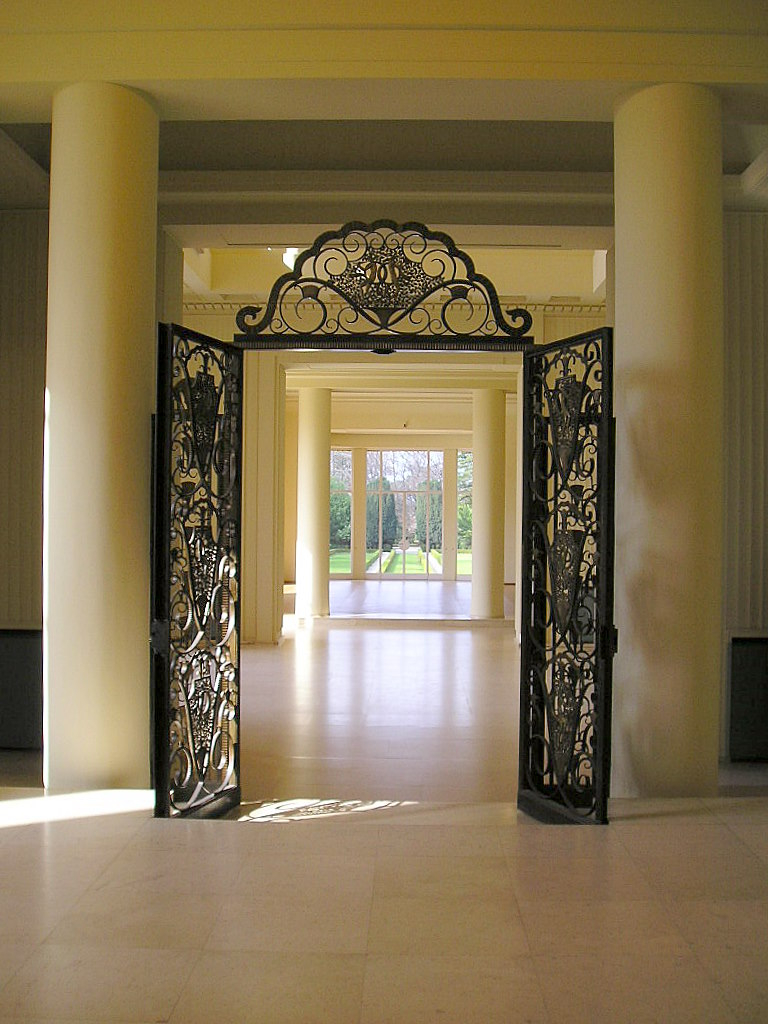
The interior of the Casa de Serralves in Porto

Charles Siclis (Paris, 1889 – New York City, 1942), was a French architect and designer.

He was educated at the School of Fine Arts in Paris, where he completed his training in 1920 and began his career in the workshop of Jean-Louis Pascal. In 1925, he participated in the International Exposition of Modern Industrial and Decorative Arts, presenting his design for the Place de Clichy garden. Charles Siclis settled his workshop in Paris, Biarritz and Nice. He had an international career, conducting or modifying works in several European countries (Casa de Serralves in Porto, the Paris-Madrid building Madrid ...) and United States, where he emigrated during World War II.

His name is associated with the construction of cinemas, casinos and especially to modern style theaters art deco. He also created villas and luxury hotels on the Basque coast and the Riviera.

Baron Philippe de Rothschild, his friend, was his patron for many works including the construction of the St. Georges theater. In 1928, he refurbished the theater of Mathurins or Pigalle Theatre (1929), one of his best works, which eventually was destroyed and replaced by a garage. Charles Siclis introduced modern and radical shapes and innovative techniques along with French regional styles in the period between World War I and II. Examples of this are cafés such as Chiquito or Le Colisée in Paris. In Saint-Symphorien, in Gironde, a private dwelling, called Siclis home, carried out between 1934 and 1938, is listed as historical monument since 2007.
