= Alberto Carneiro =

Portuguese artist (1937–2017)

Alberto Carneiro (São Mamede de Coronado, Coronado, 20 September 1937 – Porto, 15 April 2017) was a Portuguese artist.

== Biography / Works ==
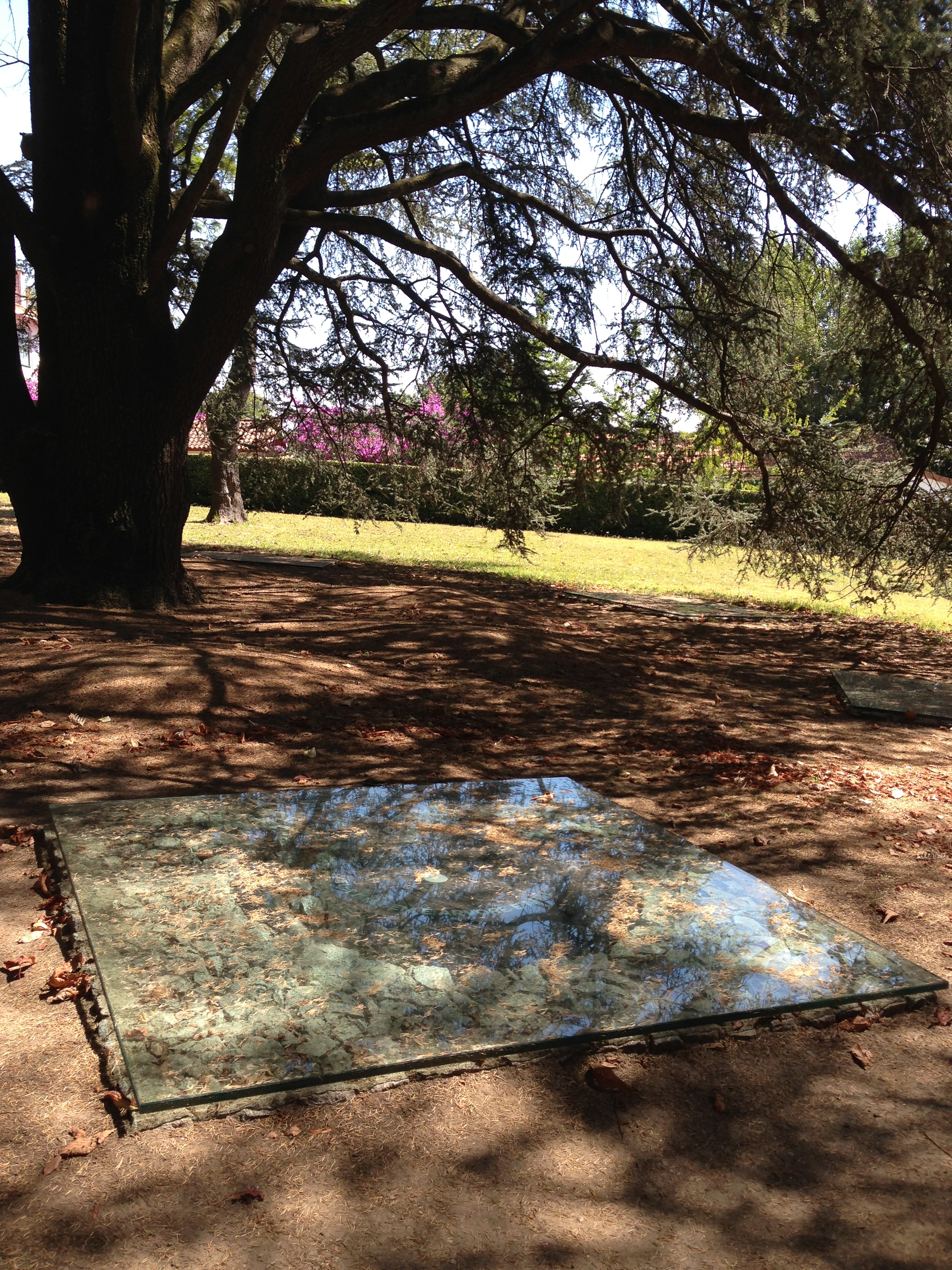
Ser Arvore e Arte Serralves

Alberto was born in Coronado, Minho in 1937. Between 1947 and 1958, he worked in religious art workshops of their land, starting on the technologies of wood, stone and ivory. He attended high school in Decorative Arts School Soares dos Reis, Porto, and Secondary School Antonio Arroyo, Lisbon.

In 1961, he formed part of the sculpture course of School of Fine Arts of Porto, ending in 1967. The following year part to London a scholarship from the Calouste Gulbenkian Foundation to attend Saint Martin's School of Art (1968–1970), where he was a student of Anthony Caro and Philip King.

In London he made contact with the newly emerging artistic trends at the end of the 1960s, notably with the minimal and British Conceptual Art. From there develops innovative projects for the Portuguese context, including The cane field: metamorphosis memory of an absent body (1968) and A forest to your dreams (1970), which approaches the Land Art, revealing a special attention to the values of an art of 'involvement', which leaves the primacy of manual labor to consider the conceptual design, a progressive dematerialization of the artwork. This anthropological vision of artistic creativity is combined with an approach to the Eastern philosophies of the essence and nature (Zen Buddhism, Tantra) and take you to draw up the 'Manifesto of Ecological Art' '(1968-72) that rejects the Western dualism sensuality / spirituality and promotes the rehabilitation of the easiest things in the mean of aesthetic communication .

In 1977, he participated in the exhibition 'Alternativa Zero'.

In addition to his art, his numerous writings contribute to the understanding of one of the works of Portuguese contemporary art, where nature, art and body come together simultaneously in a universal discourse and personal.

Between 1972 and 1976, he taught the course of sculpture at ESBAP; During the period between 1972 and 1985, he was responsible for the artistic and pedagogical guidance of Circle of Fine Arts of Coimbra (CAPC); He taught at the Faculty of Architecture of the University of Porto (1985–1994). In 1985 he received the Prize AICA.

Alberto Carneiro held a number of solo exhibitions and participated in major exhibitions, including the Venice Biennale (1976) and the Bienal de São Paulo (1977). His work was the subject of four major anthological exhibition: Calouste Gulbenkian Foundation, Lisbon, and Casa de Serralves, Porto (1991); Machado de Castro Museum, Coimbra (2000); Galician Center for Contemporary Art, Santiago de Compostela (2001); Museum of Contemporary Art of Funchal (2003). In Museum of Coa, one of the permanent showrooms presents the sculpture "Tree-Mandala for recorders Côa Valley".

Between April and June 2013 Serralves Museum of Contemporary Art, in Porto, he showed an exhibition entitled Alberto Carneiro: Arte Vida / Life Art - energy revelations and movements of matter . For the sculptor, this exhibition is a manifesto " whose central idea is to demonstrate that art is the artist and also the viewer. [...] The show is composed mostly of works unpublished created from roots and trunks of orange trees, olive trees, bamboo and vines, always accompanied by glasses or mirrors with texts that, in addition to stress the importance of the word in the work of Alberto Carneiro, involve the viewer through its reflection ''.

He died on 15 April 2017, at the age of 79.
