= Janet Daley =

British journalist

- Born: 21 March 1944 (age 82); Boston, Massachusetts, US
- Education: U. of California, Berkeley; University of London
- Occupation: Journalist
- Notable credit: The Sunday Telegraph

Janet Daley (née Klatskin; born 21 March 1944) is an American-born conservative journalist based in Britain. She is a columnist for The Sunday Telegraph.

== Early life and education ==
Daley is Jewish. She studied philosophy at the University of California at Berkeley, following which, in 1965, she moved to Britain, where she received a Master of Philosophy at the University of London.

== Career ==
=== Teaching ===
Daley then taught philosophy at the Open University, the University of London and the Royal College of Art. While teaching philosophy, she developed an interest in the philosophy of design and in 1982 published Design Creativity and Understanding Design Objectives for Design Studies (Vol. 3, No 3). She contributed to what later became recognised as an influential conference on design methods held at Portsmouth Polytechnic School of Architecture in 1967, which led to the book Design Methods in Architecture (1969), edited by Geoffrey Broadbent and Anthony Ward.

=== Journalism ===
Daley left academia in 1987 to become a journalist.

== Political views ==
During the 1960s, while a student, Daley identified as a Marxist. During the 1980s, she was a member of Hornsey Labour Party.

In a 2003 article titled "Up from Liberalism", she relates how her political views shifted from a leftist to a conservative viewpoint based on her early years in the UK. Of great significance in her ideological shift was the class structure in the UK, something she had not encountered in the United States, and exemplified she believed by a working class with limited aspirations. She noted, for instance, that "the left-wing elite castigated teachers for attempting to correct the working-class accents and dialects that help trap children in the limitations of their own backgrounds."

Daley opposed reducing the age of consent for homosexuals to that of heterosexuals. Writing in The Times, she described gay life as "aggressive freemasonry", and argued that homosexuality led to "childlessness, instability and mortal danger from Aids."

She has described the Trumpist interpretation of "political power and its uses [as] not just controversial [but] stark staring mad."

== Personal life ==
Daley married in 1967 and has two daughters.

== Works ==
- Daley, Janet (1987). All Good Men. ISBN 070113156X.
- Daley, Janet (1989). Honourable Friends. ISBN 0297796143.
