= Veit Stratmann =

German contemporary artist (born 1960)

Veit Stratmann (born 1960) is a German contemporary artist, currently living in Paris.

The work of Veit Stratmann has been developed since the early 1990s, influenced by artists of the neo-avant-garde of the 1970s, like Michael Asher. One of the characteristics of many of his works is the focus on the intervention on the location and the deliberate choice of a form of lower-aesthetic value.

His work revolves around questioning: can an artistic gesture be based on the notions of choice and decision-making – the postures of those who encounter the work? Can this decision-making and the infinite suspension of time involved in doing so become constructive material(Morgan Marlet describes this in her MA thesis on Veit Stratmann's work in the urban space as “suspending space to suspend time”).

If political action originates in the act of decision making, can an encounter with art generate a permanent oscillation between political and artistic gestures? Can an artistic gesture undo the coherence of a space without affecting its physical integrity? Or create a “parenthesis” or construct a loophole in its meaning in order to create the blurring of status? Can this become creative matter?

Can an artist's work be a deflector? Can art be the departure point of observation rather than that which is observed?

Stratmann's work is often done in and for public space. The presence of an object in public space does not necessarily confer a particular status to that given object. The encounter with an object in public space does not impose any particular status or behavioural code upon the public. Both the viewer and the work viewed define the nature and the quality of this encounter. Public space thus presents an ideal place for posing questions - and a way of transforming its fragile status into creative material.

Veit Stratmann's personal history is also at the root of his work in public space and it has undoubtedly conditioned the social issues that underline his line of questioning. Born in Germany, he moved to France in 1981. This displacement of his personal “territory” and focal point from a general sense of “belonging” (in Germany) to an acute awareness of “not belonging” (in France) reoriented his perception of space, territory, separation and belonging. He began to explore the possibilities of influencing his space without actually modifying it. Becoming aware of the limits of his space brought about questioning: how can the limits be made permeable? How can the interstices be used? How can these territories be adjusted, modified, transformed?

The range of Veit Stratmann's artistic preoccupations is anchored in this socio-cultural and spatial questioning. Yet his line of questioning enters the sphere of “art” only when there is exchange with others – as many others as possible. This naturally pulls his artistic action towards the « polis » – public space (not the political space but the space of politics). This is where decision and choice-making, negotiation, stance-taking, limitations and borders take form and make sense.

== Artwork highlights ==
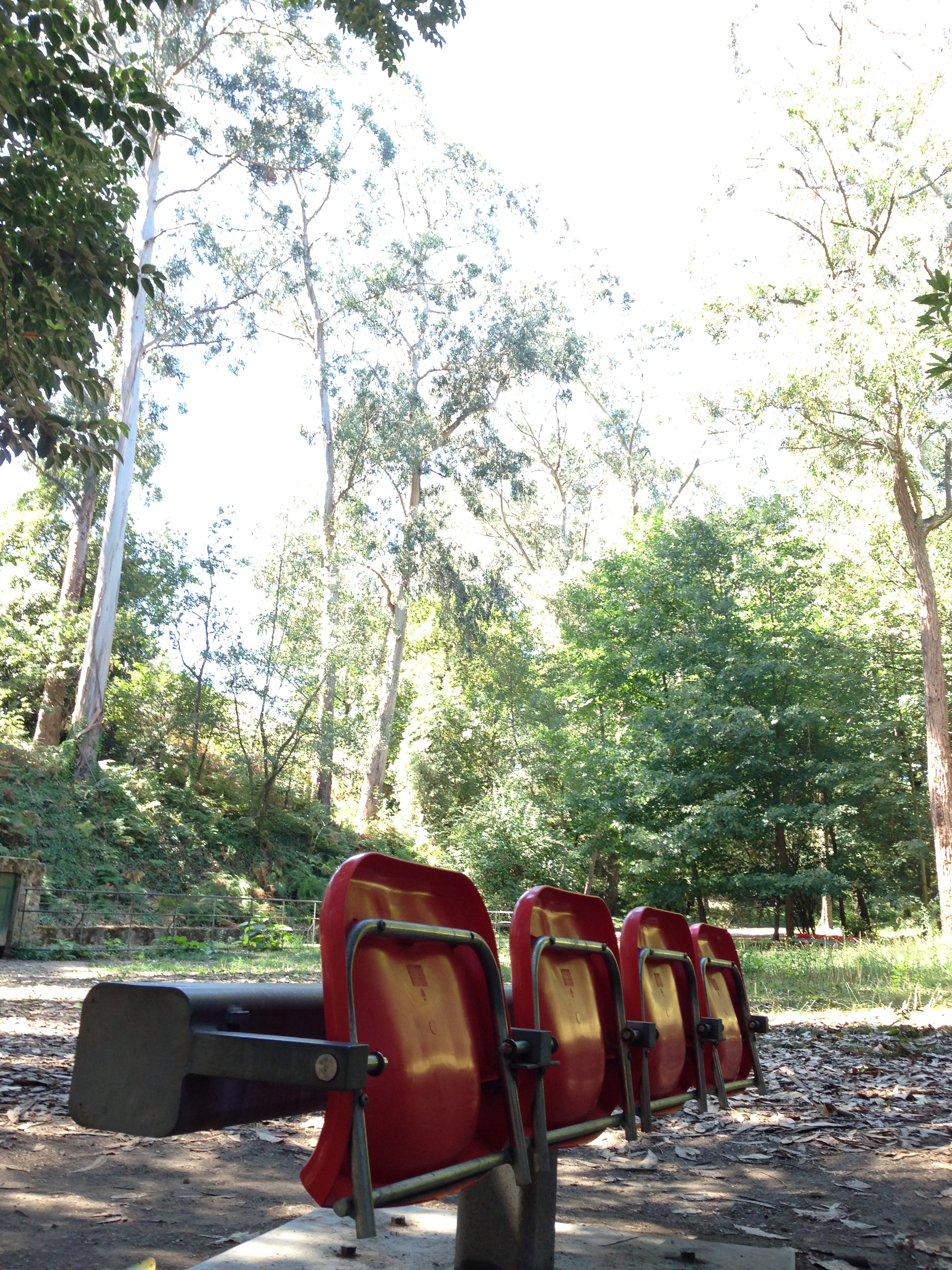
Pour le Parc
Serralves

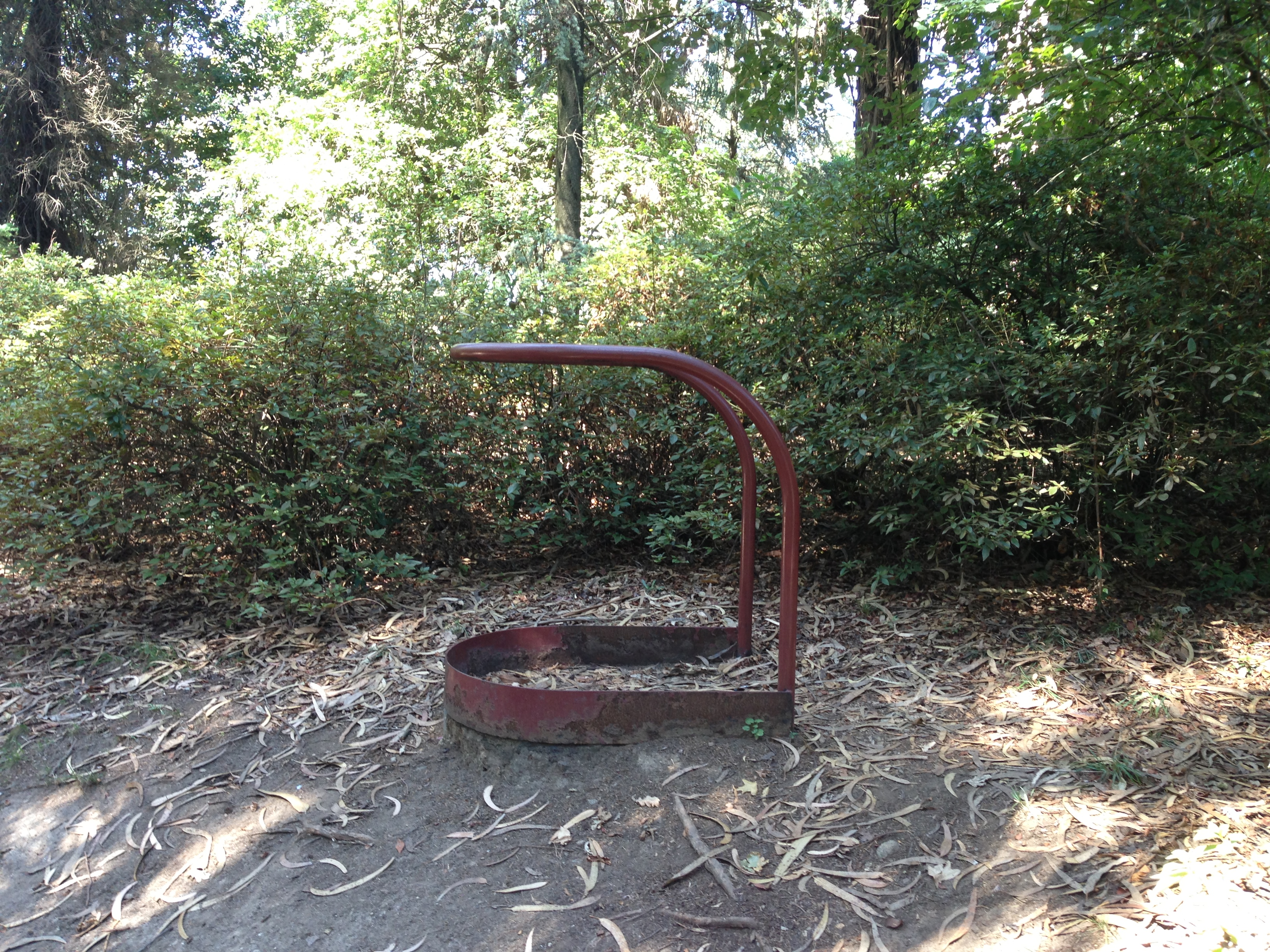
Elements pour Porto
Serralves

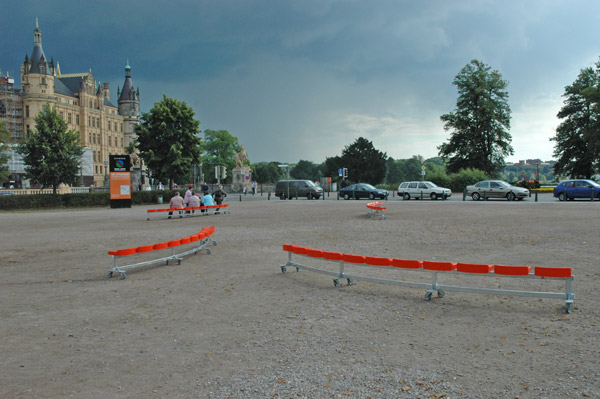
Für den Alten Garten
Schwerin 2005

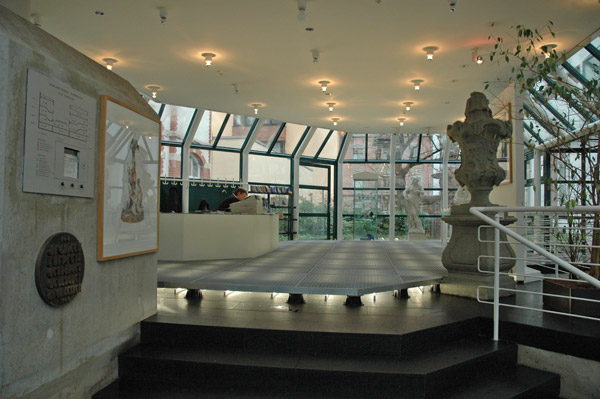
Exhibition On-Off
Saarbrücken 2006

== Exhibitions ==
- 2021: LUMIAR CITÉ, Lumiar Cité, Lisbon, Portugal
- 2019: MODULE-ESSEN, Museum Folkwang, Essen, Germany
- 2008: Veit Stratmann, Centre d'art et de Diffusin Clark, Montréal, Canada
- 2008: Fuson-confusion, Museum Folkwang, Essen, Germany
- 2007: "A porto" museu Serralves, Porto, Portugal
- 2006: La Force de l'art, Le Grand Palais, [Paris], France
- 2005: Für den Alten Garten, Staatliches Museum, Schwerin, Germany.
- 2004: A angles vifs, CAPC-Musée d'Art contemporain de Bordeaux, Bordeaux, France
- 2004: École des Beaux-Arts de Mulhouse, France.
- 2002: Das Element für die Strasse, neues Model, Badischer Kunstverein, Karlsruhe, Germany.
- 2001: Squaters, Museu Serralves, Porto, Portugal, and Witte de With, Antwerp, Belgium
- 2001: Veit Stratmann Musée des Moulages, Université Lumière, Lyon, France.
- 1997: The element for the city The Nevada state Museum of Arts, Reno, Nevada, USA.
