= Fernanda Gomes =

Brazilian visual artist (born 1960)

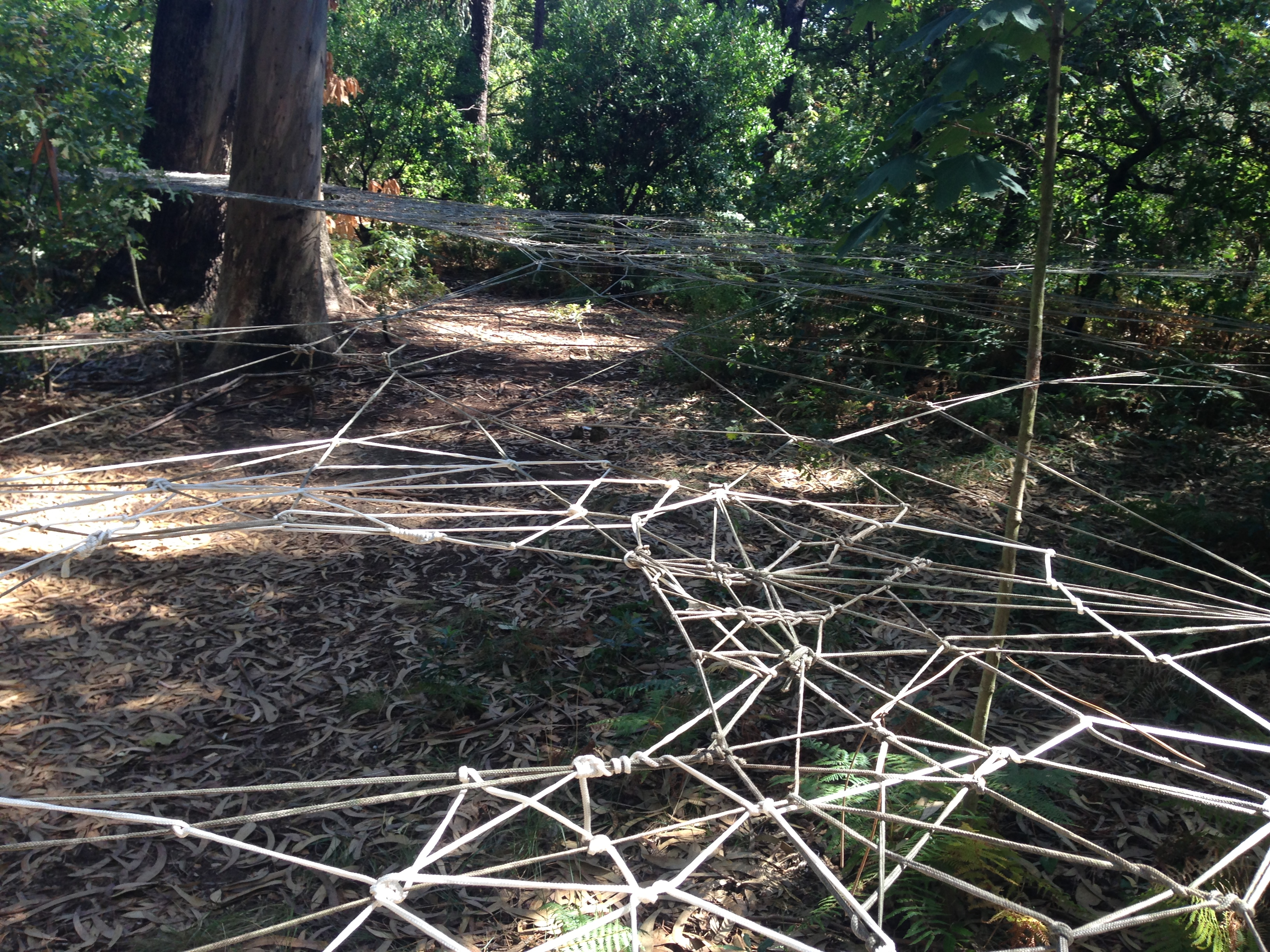
Sem Título (Fernanda Gomes, Serralves)

Fernanda Gomes (born 1960) is a Brazilian visual artist. She emerged as part of the generation of Rio de Janeiro-born artists that also include Beatriz Milhazes, Ernesto Neto and Adriana Varejão. With a career that began in the 1980s, her first solo exhibition took place in London in 1997.

Gomes creates art with all kinds of leftover materials: everyday objects, old furniture, glasses, mirrors, magnets, various types of string, hair, cigarette ends, coins and newspaper.

Exhibitions include a solo exhibit at Pavilhão Branco - Museu da Cidade, Lisbon, Portugal as well as group shows at Museu de Arte Moderna do Rio de Janeiro and Oficina para Proyectos de Arte A.C., Guadalajara, Mexico. Museums that exhibit her work include Tate Modern, Miami Art Museum, Fundación/Colección Jumex, Vancouver Art Gallery, Centre Georges Pompidou, Museu da Pampulha, Museu de Arte Moderna do Rio de Janeiro and Museu Serralves where she created a permanent sculpture in the museum's park. Her work has also been included at Venice Biennale, Istanbul Biennale, São Paulo Biennale, Sydney Biennale, Champ d'expériences, Centre d'art de Vassivière, Vassivière en Limousin, Les Prairies, Biennale de Rennes, The Imminence of Poetics 30th São Paulo Bienal and Centre d'art de Vassivière.

Gomes was born in Rio de Janeiro, Brazil.
