= List of recipients of the Grand Cross of the Order of Entrepreneurial Merit =

The Order of Entrepreneurial Merit (Portuguese: Ordem do Mérito Empresarial) is the most junior of the Portuguese civil orders of merit, and is intended to distinguish those who have rendered, as an entrepreneur or worker, outstanding service in promoting appreciation or services in an economic sector. The Order has three classes: Agricultural, Commercial and Industrial. The order was established in 1893 by King Carlos I as the Civil Order of Agricultural and Industrial Merit; the commercial class was added in 1991, and the order given its present name in 2011.

The following is a list of recipients of the order's highest grade, Grand Cross.

Source for the list: "Entidades Nacionais Agraciadas com Ordens Portuguesas", Ordens Honoríficas Portuguesas (Office of the President of Portugal). Retrieved 19 February 2019.

== Agricultural class ==
=== Portuguese recipients ===
Name	Date	Notes
Eduardo Fernandes de Oliveira	30 January 1928	
João Coelho da Mota Prego	30 January 1931	Engineer
Francisco Maria Martinho de Almeida Manoel de Vilhena	2 January 1964	Engineer
António Pereira Sousa da Câmara	28 May 1969	Engineer
Domingos Rosado Vitória Pires	9 August 1973	Engineer
Joaquim António Rosado Gusmão	4 February 1989	Engineer
Professor Dr Carlos Manuel Leitão Baeta Neves	26 March 1991	
Professor Dr Apolinário José Barbosa da Cruz Vaz Portugal	20 November 1991	
Professor Dr Raúl Rosado Fernandes	4 May 2001	
José Manuel Rodrigues Casqueiro	4 May 2001	
Tomaz Pedro Ribeiro Corrêa	4 May 2001	Engineer
Andrade José Joaquim Lima Monteiro	4 May 2001	Engineer
Fernando Lobo Guedes	9 June 2001	Businessman
Fernando da Silva Mendonça	9 October 2005	
Dr Fernando Manuel Van-Zeller Gomes da Silva	17 January 2006	
Dr Luís Manuel Capoulas Santos	17 January 2006	
João Pedro Gorjão Cyrillo Machado	17 January 2006	
Dr Arlindo Marques da Cunha	9 June 2015	
Manuel Efigénio Cano de Castro e Brito	10 May 2016	Engineer

=== Foreign recipients ===
Name	Date	Note	Country
Thomás de Allende y Garcia Baxter	30 December 1970		Spain
Baron Pierre Le Roy de Boiseaumarie	17 September 1963		France
Manuel Trucco Gaete	5 August 1950		Chile
Cirilo Cánovas Garcia	27 December 1960	Engineer	Spain
Dr Hermann Hãcherl	31 March 1969		Germany
Dr Adolfo Diaz Ambrona Moreno	6 December 1966		Spain

== Industrial class ==
=== Portuguese recipients ===
Name	Date	Note
General José Maria de Oliveira Simões	29 March 1927	
Pedro Gomes da Silva	31 December 1927	
João de Fontes Pereira de Melo Ferreira de Mesquita	10 May 1929	Engineer
Brigadier-General Manuel Gonçalves da Silveira Azevedo e Castro	20 May 1929	
General Teófilo José da Trindade	11 July 1929	
José Maria Alvares	6 November 1929	
Narciso Ferreira	21 March 1930	
Fausto Cardoso de Figueiredo	22 September 1930	
Colonel Júlio César de Carvalho Teixeira	5 October 1930	
Professor Dr Moisés Bensabat Amzalak Amzalak	5 October 1930	
Jaime de Vasconcelos Thompson	30 January 1931	
Cidade da Covilhã	3 December 1931	
Alfredo da Silva	31 December 1932	
Pedro Joyce Diniz	20 January 1934	
António de Oliveira Calem	1 August 1934	
Joaquim Roque da Fonseca	18 December 1940	
António Teófilo de Araújo Rato	5 December 1942	
António de Almeida Vasconcelos Correia	14 February 1945	Engineer
Delfim Ferreira	20 June 1951	
Câmara Portuguesa de Comércio e Indústria do Rio de Janeiro	17 May 1958	
Manuel Augusto José de Melo	4 August 1959	
António de Sommer Champalimaud	15 September 1961	
Carlos Alfredo Garcia Alves	5 July 1968	
Dr Jorge Augusto Caetano da Silva José de Mello	2 July 1969	
José Manuel da Silva José de Mello	2 July 1969	
António de Medeiros e Almeida	8 October 1969	
Lúcio Tomé Feteira	30 June 1970	
Mário Drumond Borges	30 June 1973	Engineer
Artur Cupertino de Miranda	17 March 1983	
Jorge Rocha de Matos	21 August 1990	
Angelo Ludgero da Silva Marques	9 June 1995	Engineer
Joaquim Augusto Coelho Ferreira da Bernarda	22 September 1998	
Dr Adalberto Manuel da Fonseca Neiva de Oliveira	22 September 1998	
Salvador Fernandes Caetano	18 February 2000	
Fortunato Oliveira Frederico	9 June 2005	
Francisco Xavier Bello Van Zeller	17 January 2006	Engineer
João Augusto Sanguinetti da Costa Carvalho Talone	17 January 2006	Engineer
Álvaro Pinho da Costa Leite	17 January 2006	
Pedro Mendonça de Queiroz Pereira	6 November 2009	
Dr Paulo Jorge dos Santos Fernandes	2 July 2010	
Dr Alexandre Carlos de Melo Vieira da Costa Relvas	30 April 2014	
Dr António Luís Teixeira Guerra Nunes Mexia	30 April 2014	
Dr Filipe Maurício de Botton	30 April 2014	
João Manuel Resende Picoito	26 February 2016	Engineer

=== Foreign recipients ===
Name	Date	Notes	Country
Maurice Despret	20 August 1928	Senator	Belgium
Pablo Verdaguez Gomes	30 December 1929		Spain
Germain Martin	2 September 1930		France
Alexandre Zeuceano	2 September 1930	Minister Pleniopotentary	Romania
Frederico Jarach	16 March 1932		Italy
Ildefonso Gonzoly Fierro y Ordonez	21 March 1934		Spain
Hans Eltze	7 June 1943		Germany
Alexander Roger	7 February 1946		United Kingdom
Don Fernando Guijarro Alconcer	17 November 1949		Spain
Axel Axson Johnson	25 April 1950		Sweden
Hermann Reinhardt	29 May 1951		Germany
Thomás Sunez y Ferrer	8 August 1951		Spain
José Navarro Revertez y Gomis	14 May 1953		Spain
Juan António Suances Fernandez	18 July 1953		Spain
Joaquim Planell Riera	18 July 1953		Spain
Edmundo Penna Barbosa da Silva	3 February 1956		Brazil
Jacques Van Offelen	5 July 1960		Belgium
Dr Otto Stalmann	29 May 1961		Germany
Dr Gunther Serres	29 May 1961		Germany
Konsul Manfres von Mautnez Markhof	3 February 1966		Austria
Francisco Giménez Torres	20 April 1978		Spain
António Gomes da Costa	22 September 1981		Brazil
António Garrigues Diaz Cauabate	16 February 1982		Spain
Curt Nicolin	11 December 1990		Sweden
Peter Wallenberg	11 December 1990		Sweden
Abraham Kasinsky	25 March 1996		Brazil
Dr Reinfried Franz Pohl	22 December 1998		Germany
Josef Käser	13 May 2015		Germany
Fernando da Cruz Souza Pinto	12 January 2018	Engineer	Brazil

== Commercial class (since 1991) ==
=== Portuguese recipients ===
Name	Date	Note
Dr Manuel Eduardo de Noronha Gamito	10 June 1991	
Dr Manuel Ricardo Pinheiro Espirito Santo Silva	31 October 1991	
Dr Ma Man Kei	30 March 1995	
Dr Ruy Octávio Matos de Carvalho	4 March 1998	
Dr António Mota de Sousa Horta Osório	9 June 2014	
Zeinal Abedin Mohamed Bava	9 June 2014	Engineer
Elísio Alexandre Soares dos Santos	17 March 2017	

=== Foreign recipients ===
Name	Date	Country
Tasuku Takagaki	22 February 1994	Japan
