= Delfim Ferreira =

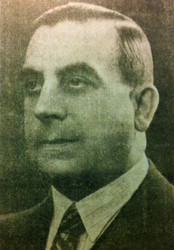
- Born: December 13, 1888; Riba de Ave, Portugal
- Died: 24 September 1960 (aged 71); Porto, Portugal
- Occupations: Entrepreneur; industrial; philanthropist
- Notable work: Hotel Infante Sagres, Porto; Palácio do Comércio, Porto
- Spouse: Sílvia Gomes Ferreira (since 1909)
- Children: Maria de Lurdes; Maria Alice; Sílvia; Delfim Alexandre
- Parents: Narciso Ferreira (1862–1933) (father); Eva Rosa de Oliveira Ferreira (1861–1913) (mother)
- Relatives: Raúl Ferreira (1895–1974), Count of Riba d'Ave; Etc.
- Awards: Commander of the Order of Merit (1930); Commander of the Military Order of Christ (1933); Grand Officer of the Order of Industrial Merit (1948); Grand Cross of the Order of Merit (1951); Gold Medal of the City of Vila do Conde

Delfim Ferreira ComM, ComC, GOME, GCM (13 December 1888 – 24 September 1960) was an important Portuguese entrepreneur, born in the town of Riba d'Ave, Vila Nova de Famalição. He was the son of the great Portuguese industrial Narciso Ferreira, who, from a small manual mill, built the largest textile enterprise that existed in Portugal in the second half of the nineteenth century.

Educated at the Royal and Imperial School of Reichenberg, Delfim Ferreira, in the 1940s, intended to build a shopping mall in Porto. He expanded his business into other economic sectors, including hydroelectric power and civil construction, contributing to the development of Vale do Ave and providing employment to thousands of workers.

He was awarded the grade of Commander of the Order of Merit (1930), Commander of the Military Order of Christ (1933), Grand Officer of the Order of Industrial Merit (1948), the Grand Cross of the Order of Merit (1951), and the Gold Medal of the City of Vila do Conde.

He was also the owner of the Casa de Serralves, now a house-museum belonging to the Serralves Foundation, where he lived until his death from cancer in 1960, at a time when he was considered the richest man in Portugal.

He is buried in the Cemetery of Prado do Repouso in Porto.

== Tributes ==
- Delfim Ferreira Externato (non-boarding school), Riba de Ave, founded in 1962 and closed in 2019
- Bust of Commander Delfim Ferreira, Peso da Régua, inaugurated in 1970
- Delfim Ferreira Barracks, Peso da Régua Fire Department
- Delfim Ferreira Street, Vila Nova de Famalicão
- Delfim Ferreira Street, Porto
- Etc.
