= Aldobrandini Tazze =

Set of Renaissance-era silver-gilt cups

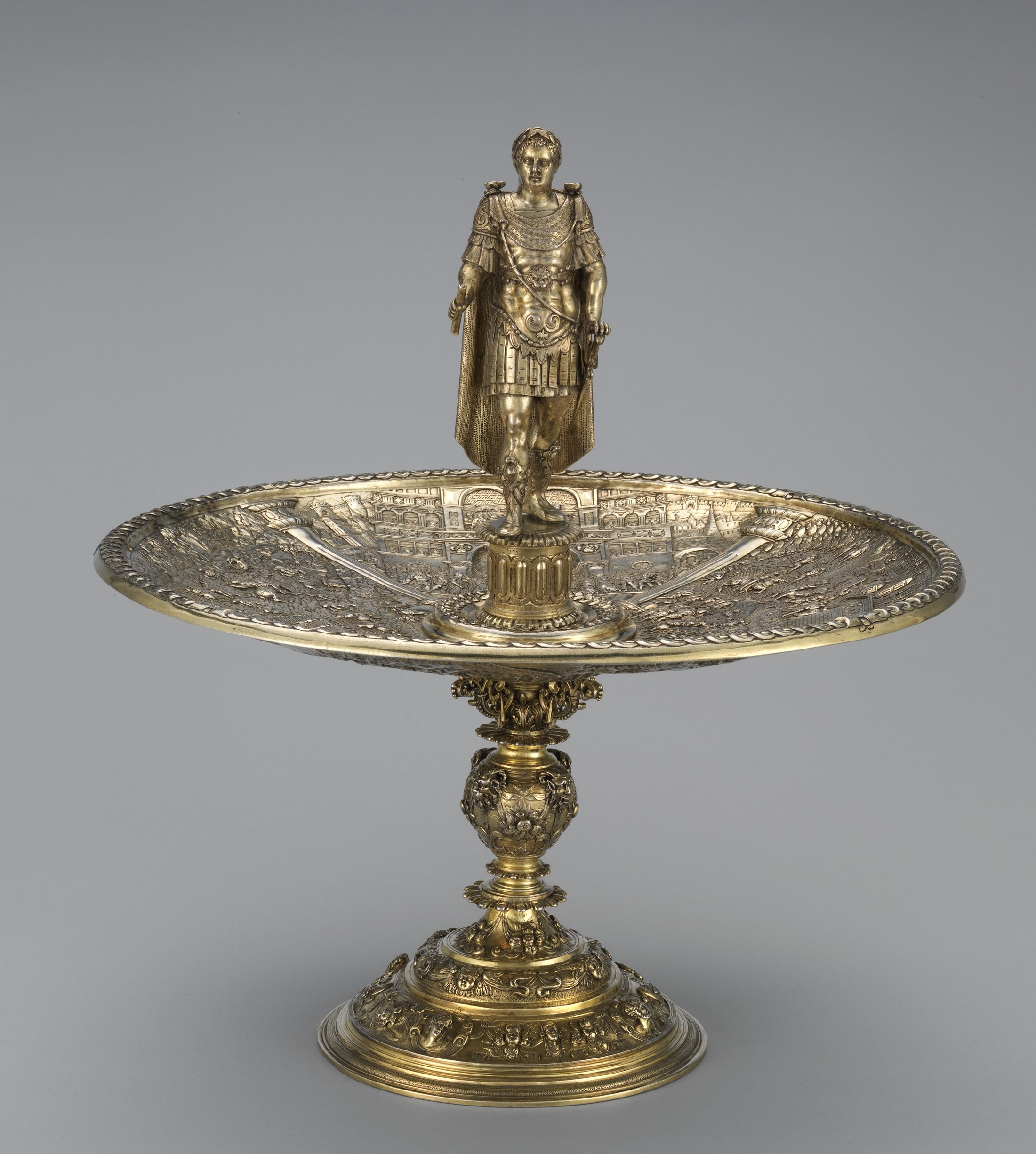
Vitellius tazza, Metropolitan Museum of Art

The Aldobrandini Tazze are a set of 12 silver-gilt standing cups in the shallow tazza shape (plural tazze), sometimes described as bowls or dishes. They are outstanding examples of Renaissance metalwork, described by John Hayward as "the most impressive single monument of Italian and perhaps European goldsmith's work of the 16th century", and by the Victoria and Albert Museum as "one of the most spectacular groups of 16th century silver to survive".

Each tazza comprises a shallow bowl mounted on a high foot and stem. A vertical pedestal rises from the centre of the bowl, topped by a standing figurine of one of the first Roman emperors whose lives are described in The Twelve Caesars by the Roman author Suetonius. The inside surface of each bowl is chased with four scenes from Suetonius's life of the relevant emperor.

The tazze have a complicated and somewhat uncertain history and provenance. At one time they were attributed to Benvenuto Cellini, but that attribution is no longer considered correct. Later it was considered that they may have been made by artists from the Netherlands, or possibly from Augsburg or Nuremberg in Germany, perhaps working in Italy. More recent scholarship by Julia Siemon indicates they were made in the southern Netherlands, possibly for a Habsburg patron, perhaps Archduke Albert VII of Austria, towards the end of the 16th century, and then acquired by a member of the Aldobrandini family before 1603. Different bowls have slightly different styles, suggesting that a team of silversmiths was involved. The set was originally owned by the Aldobrandini family and their descendants until at least 1769, and remained together in a single collection until at least 1861. The vessels were originally plain "white" silver, but were gilded in the decade after 1861. The group was then dispersed and examples are now held by several different museums and private collectors. In the late 19th century, six of the original bases, with restrained classically-inspired fluting on the foot and stem, were replaced with more flamboyantly decorated 16th century bases, possibly of Spanish origin. Over time, the interchangeable parts of several tazze, most noticeably the bowls and figurines, have been mixed, so a bowl showing scenes from the life of one emperor may now be found in a collection with the figurine of a different emperor.

The 12 tazze were reunited at the Metropolitan Museum of Art in New York City in 2014, at the start of a major research project. This endeavor resulted in an exhibition organized by Siemon, The Silver Caesars: A Renaissance Mystery, which was accompanied by a volume of essays by the same title. During the exhibition, which was on view from 12 December 2017 until March 11, 2018. The exhibition then traveled to Waddesdon Manor in England in 2018, where it was on view from 18 April until 22 July. Videos exploring how the Nero tazza and Vitellius tazza depict their Suetonian content were created by Siemon and Beard for display in the exhibition, and can be viewed on the Metropolitan Museum's YouTube channel. During the exhibition, the tazze were displayed in public for the first time since the mid-19th century.

== Description ==
Each tazza is a bowl or cup, approximately 40 cm or 16 in high. The form is based on the kylix, a broad shallow wine-drinking cup from Ancient Greece, also the source of the word "chalice". Some tazze could be used for drinking, but they would also be used as serving dishes for small food items, such as delicacies, sweets or fruit. These lavishly decorated vessels were probably intended primarily as a spectacular display of wealth and artistic taste. They were cast in sections that screw together, with seven main parts: a base, comprising a foot and stem; a disc to support the bowl, normally concealed beneath it; the circular dish-like bowl itself; a low pedestal standing above the centre of bowl; and the figurine of a Roman emperor mounted on the pedestal, with separate cape.

The inside surface of each shallow bowl is chased, with guilloche decoration around the edge. Chased classical columns separate the space into four panels, each showing a scene taken from the life of the relevant Roman emperor: Julius Caesar, Augustus, Tiberius, Caligula, Claudius, Nero, Galba, Otho, Vitellius, Vespasian, Titus, or Domitian. Several of the bowls are also decorated with the arms of the Italian Aldobrandini family, with a galero or ecclesiastical hat with six tassels to either side. These denote ecclesiastical rank in the hierarchy of the Catholic Church, with six tassels usually indicating a bishop. In many cases, the arms are marked on the underside of the bowl, suggesting the set was not commissioned by the Aldobrandini family but acquired later.

The silver tazze were made in white metal in around 1560–70, and were gilded after 1861. The designer and maker is not known. Differences in style between the chased decoration of the bowls suggests that more than several skilled craftsmen were involved. Elements of the bowl decoration may be derived from the work of Italian artist Pirro Ligorio (1513–1583), and the figurines may be based on work by the Flemish artist Johannes Stradanus (1523–1605) who worked in Italy in the late 16th century. In six cases, the original foot and stem with restrained classically-inspired fluting has been replaced by a contemporaneous but more decorative foot from another source, possibly from a set of 16th-century Spanish monstrances or reliquaries.

== Early history ==
The early history of the tazze is not known securely. The 12 tazze are included in an inventory of Cardinal Pietro Aldobrandini dated 1603. It is possible that they were owned by Ippolito Aldobrandini the Elder (1536–1605), who became Pope Clement VIII in 1592. If the six tassels on the family arms accurately indicate a bishop, they suggest he acquired the tazze before he became a cardinal in 1585. However, the marks may have been added later by other relatives who were also Catholic clergymen. Perhaps more likely, they may have been given to Cardinal Pietro Aldobrandini by Archduke Albert VII of Austria: the Aldobrandini family hosted the Archduke during his visit to Ferrara in 1598, when he was released from his office as cardinal by Pope Clement VIII before hismarriage by procuration to Isabella Clara Eugenia, Infanta of Spain, in parallel to the marriage of her half-brother Philip III of Spain to Archduke Albert's niece Margaret of Austria.

It seems that the complete set came into the ownership of Cardinal Ippolito Aldobrandini the Younger (1592–1638), and they were included in an inventory made in 1638, after his death. They were probably inherited through his mother, Olimpia Aldobrandini (1567–1637) from her brothers, the Cardinal-nephews Pietro Aldobrandini (1551–1610) and Cinzio Aldobrandini (1571–1621). The tazze passed to Ippolito the Younger's niece Olimpia Aldobrandini (1623–1682), who was married first to Paolo Borghese (1622–1646) in 1638 and then to Camillo Pamphilj (1622–1666) in 1647. The tazze were inherited by her son Giovanni Battista Pamphilij (1648–1709), and are included in an inventory made in 1710, when they were held in the Guardaroba Aldobrandini in the Palazzo del Corso. The tazze are recorded in the ownership of the Borghese branch of the family in 1769. They may have remained in Italy until around 1798, when Napoleon's army occupied Rome.

== History from the 19th century ==
The set of 12 tazze may have been taken to London by a steward of the Pamphilj family in the early 19th century. They were in the possession of the retail silversmith Kensington Lewis (c.1790–1854) in London by 1826. Attributed to Benvenuto Cellini, the set was sold for 1,000 guineas by the London auctioneer George Robins in February 1834. They came into the collection of Charles Scarisbrick (1801–1860) of Scarisbrick Hall in Lancashire. After his death, they were sold again at Christie's in London in May 1861 for 1,200 guineas, and acquired by the art dealer Richard Attenborough. It seems that they were gilded at some point in the decade after 1861: earlier inventories and descriptions record them as being made of silver; later descriptions record them as silver-gilt.

A set of casts of the 12 emperor figurines was made while the collection was complete. These casts were in a private collection in the UK in the 1970s, and offered for sale at Christie's in 1976 by the estate of the Arthur Gore, 6th Earl of Arran.

The Paris dealer Frédéric Spitzer acquired the tazze, and he may have sold six of them (Augustus, Tiberius, Caligula, Claudius, Nero, Galba) to different collectors, with as many as five being acquired by various members of the Rothschild family. The six tazze that remained in Spitzer's collection (Julius Caesar, Otho, Vitellius, Vespasian, Titus, Domitian) until his death were sold in Paris in 1893. Some of the bowls and emperors had become mismatched, and Spitzer had replaced the simple fluted stem and base described at earlier auctions with more elaborate bases, perhaps assisted by Spitzer's frequent collaborator, the Aachen goldsmith and art faker Reinhold Vasters. According to Hayward, the replacement feet and stems may have been removed from contemporary 16th-century Spanish monstrances or reliquaries and attached to the tazze by Spitzer to increase their market appeal and price. Five were acquired by the Frankfurt art dealer Jakob Goldschmidt, but the Julius Caesar tazza was sold separately.

== Recent scholarship ==
Research by Yvonne Hackenbroch published in 1950, by John Hayward published in 1970, and by David Revere McFadden published in 1976, have helped to clarify the history and provenance of the tazze. McFadden said in 1976 that "several bowls and figures are, at present, unlocated, including the bowl and figure of Tiberius, the Claudius figure and bowl, the Nero bowl, and the figure of Galba". The locations of these items have become known since the 1970s. The complete Claudius tazza (figure and bowl) is in a private collection, as is the bowl of the Nero tazza; the figure of Galba is in Lisbon, with a bowl identified as part of the Caligula tazza.

The location of all known surviving elements became clear when the 12 tazze were reunited at the Metropolitan Museum of Art in 2014, and displayed together at an exhibition there from December 2017 to March 2018, reconfigured to show the correct emperor with the correct bowl. They were disassembled to be shipped for exhibition at Waddesdon Manor from April to July 2018, where again they will be shown in their proper configuration. After the exhibition, the intention is to return them to their current owners in their modern, mismatched state, but negotiations are ongoing to reverse the mismatches on a more permanent basis.

Only one tazza, of Claudius, remains in its original configuration, with the original fluted base, and the Claudius bowl matched with the Claudius figurine. Five others have the original base, but the bowls and figurines are mismatched (Galba bowl with Caligula figurine, and Caligula bowl with Galba figurine; Augustus bowl with Nero figurine, Nero bowl with Tiberius figurine, Tiberius bowl with Domitian figurine). The Domitian bowl is associated with the Augustus figurine, but has a replica of its original fluted base (the original is lost). Four others (Julius Caesar, Otho, Vitellius, and Vespasian) have matching bowls and figurines but replaced decorated bases. The Titus bowl is missing both its figurine and its base.

== The 12 tazze ==
- Julius Caesar
  - The Julius Caesar tazza (bowl and figurine, but with replaced decorated base) is held by the Museo Lázaro Galdiano, Madrid. It was exhibited as part of the collection assembled by José Lázaro Galdiano in New York, and exhibited at the Museu Nacional de Arte Antiga (National Museum of Ancient Art) in Lisbon in 1945.
- Augustus
  - The bowl of the Augustus tazza (with original fluted base, and associated with the figurine of Nero) was sold at Christie's in 2000 for just over £1m and is now in the collection of Selim Zilkha. Previously, since at least 1913, it was in the Wernher Collection at Luton Hoo, possibly acquired from the Frankfurt art dealer Jakob Goldschmidt.
  - The Augustus figurine (associated with the bowl of the Domitian tazza) is now held by the Minneapolis Institute of Arts. Previously (per Hayward 1970) they were in the collection of Standish Vereker, 7th Viscount Gort.
- Tiberius
  - The bowl of the Tiberius tazza (with original fluted base, and now associated with the figurine of Domitian) is the Victoria and Albert Museum, London. The tazza was donated to the Victoria and Albert Museum by Walter Leo Hildburgh in 1956, after being displayed on loan there since 1937. The bowl was traditionally thought to show Domitian but has recently been re-identified as Tiberius; it is now associated with the figurine of Domitian, but until 1956 with the figurine of Vitellius. The Vitellius figurine was removed in 1956 and transferred as part of a three-way swap: the figurine of Vitellius was sent to the Metropolitan Museum of Art in New York; the Metropolitan Museum sent its figurine of Otho to the Royal Ontario Museum in Toronto, and the figurine of Domitian from Toronto was sent to the Victoria and Albert Museum in London. The attempt to correct the mismatches reunited the Vitellius and Otho bowls in New York and Toronto with the correct figurines, and was intended to reunite Domitian too, but inadvertently created a new mismatch in London.
  - The Tiberius figurine (associated with the bowl of the Nero tazza) is held in a private collection, on loan to the Metropolitan Museum of Art.
- Caligula
  - The bowl of the Caligula tazza (with original fluted base, and associated with the figurine of Galba) is at the Casa-Museu Medeiros e Almeida in Lisbon.
  - The Caligula figurine (associated with the bowl of the Galba tazza) is in the Bruno Schroder collection in the United Kingdom. The mismatched tazza was sold at Christie's, London in June 1960.
- Claudius
  - The Claudius tazza (bowl and figurine, with original fluted base) is held in a private collection, on loan to the Metropolitan Museum of Art, New York.
- Nero
  - The bowl of the Nero tazza (with original fluted base, associated with the figurine of Tiberius) is in a private collection, on loan to the Metropolitan Museum of Art.
  - The figurine of Nero (associated with the bowl of the Augustus tazza) is now in the collection of Selim Zilkha (see above).
- Galba
  - The bowl of the Galba tazza (with original fluted base, and associated with the figurine of Caligula) is in the Bruno Schroder collection in the United Kingdom (see above).
  - The Galba figurine (associated with the Caligula bowl) is held by the Casa-Museu Medeiros e Almeida in Lisbon.
- Otho
  - The Otho tazza (bowl and figurine, but with replaced decorated base) are held in the Lee Collection at the Royal Ontario Museum, Toronto, since before 1976. It was previously owned by Viscount Lee of Fareham. (The Otho bowl had been associated with the figurine of Domitian, which sent to Victoria and Albert Museum, London in 1956).
- Vitellius
  - The Vitellius tazza (bowl and figurine, but with replaced decorated base) is held by the Metropolitan Museum of Art, New York (previously with the figurine of Otho, send to the Royal Ontario Museum, Toronto in 1956). It was owned by Dr. Walter Leo Hildburgh, and then Jules S. Bache, until 1944, and was acquired by the Metropolitan Museum of Art using the Fletcher Fund in 1945.
- Vespasian
  - The Vespasian tazza (bowl and figurine, but with replaced decorated base) are in the private Al Thani collection in London. It was exhibited at Burlington House in 1901, acquired by J. Pierpont Morgan, sold at Christie's in New York in October 1982, and then sold again at Sotheby's in New York in February 2013 for $1.4m.
- Titus
  - The bowl of the Titus tazza is in the Museu Nacional de Arte Antiga, Lisbon. The complete tazza was previously owned by Bertram Ashburnham, 4th Earl of Ashburnham, but was sold without the base or the emperor figurine – described as a rosewater dish by Cellini – at the Ashburnham sale at Christie's in March 1914. The bowl was sold again at Christie's in 1935, by William Randolph Hearst from his collection at St. Donat's Castle. The original base and figurine are now lost.
  - There is a 19th century replica of the bowl of the Titus tazza (with replaced decorated base, and associated with a copy of the Julius Caesar figurine). It was in the Wernher Collection at Luton Hoo before 1913 and sold at Sotheby in 2000. It is now in a private collection.
- Domitian
  - The bowl of the Domitian tazza (with a replica of its original fluted base, and associated with the figurine of Augustus) is held by the Minneapolis Institute of Art.
  - The Domitian figurine is held by the Victoria and Albert Museum, associated with a bowl (with replaced decorated base) previously thought to be part of the Domitian tazza, but now thought to show Tiberius. The figurine was sent to London from Toronto in the 1950s."
Images of the Vitellius tazza

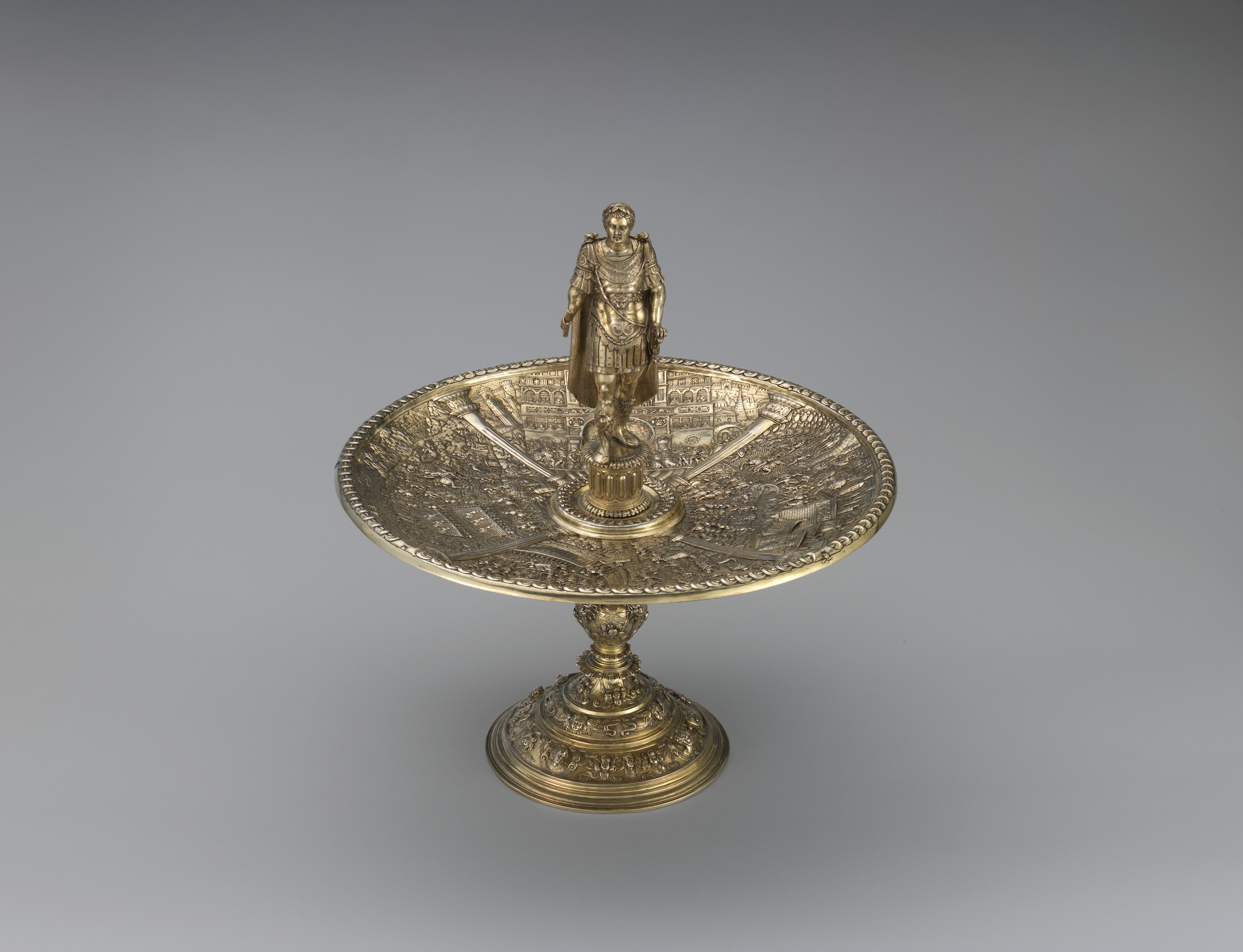

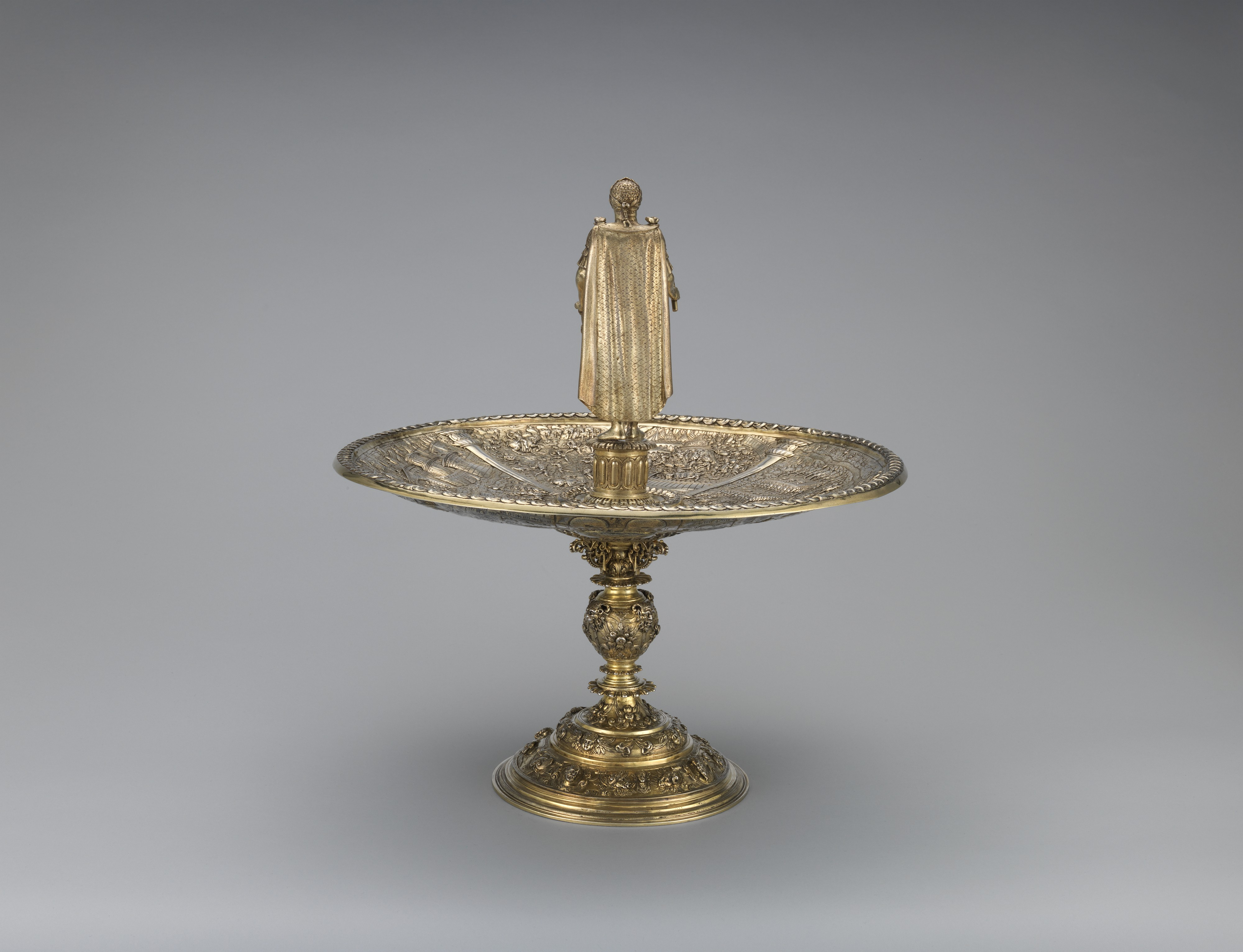

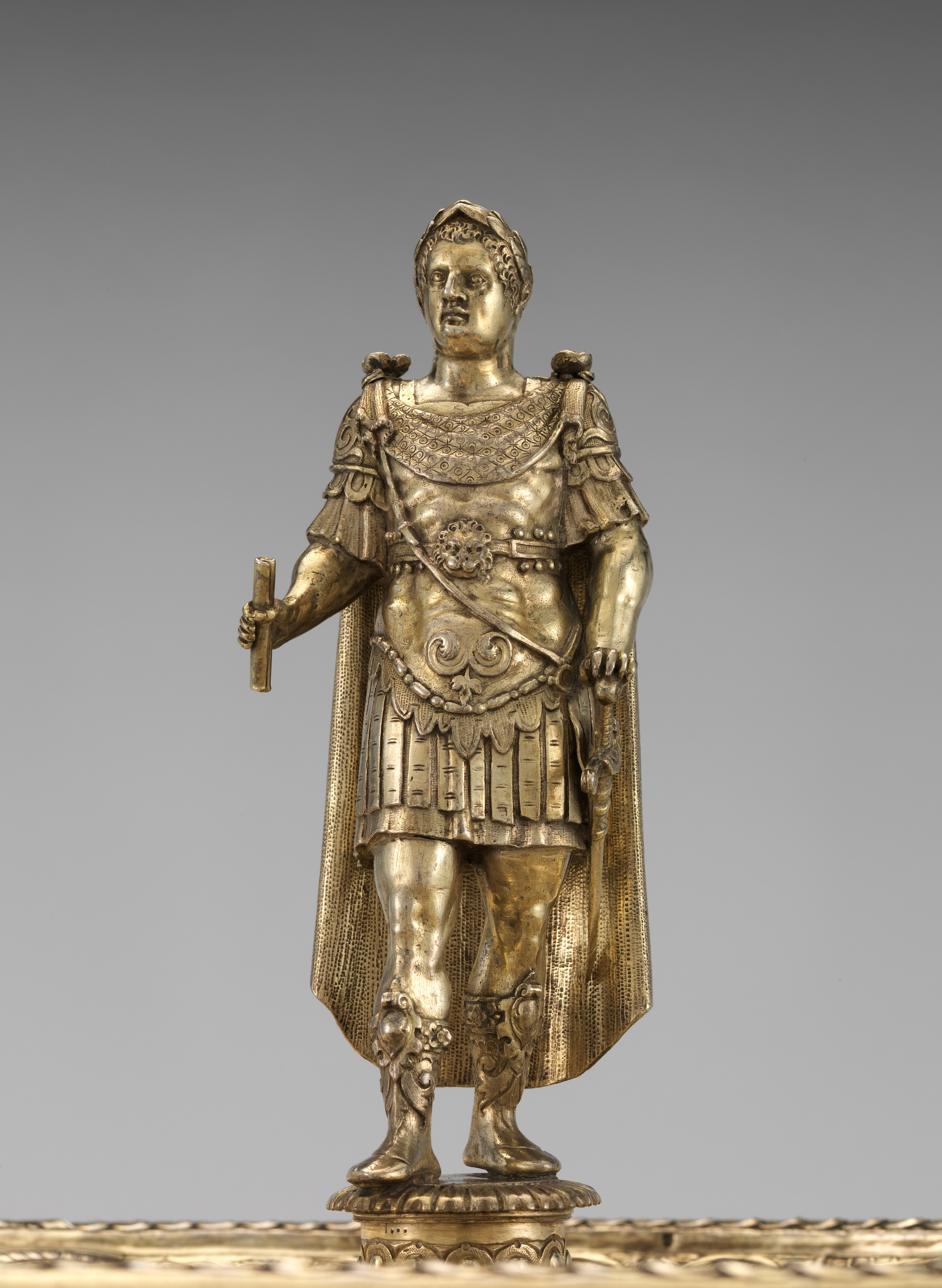

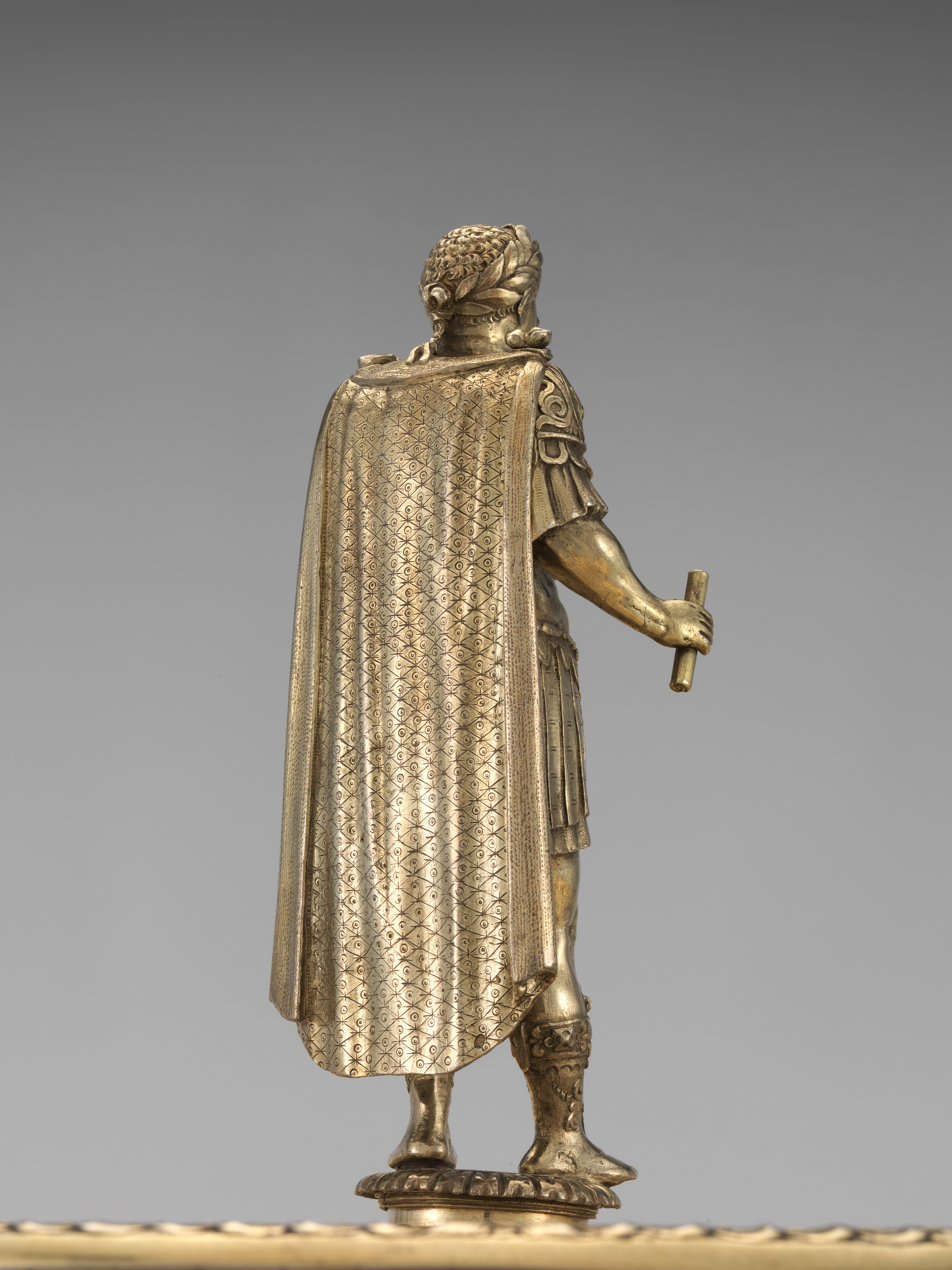

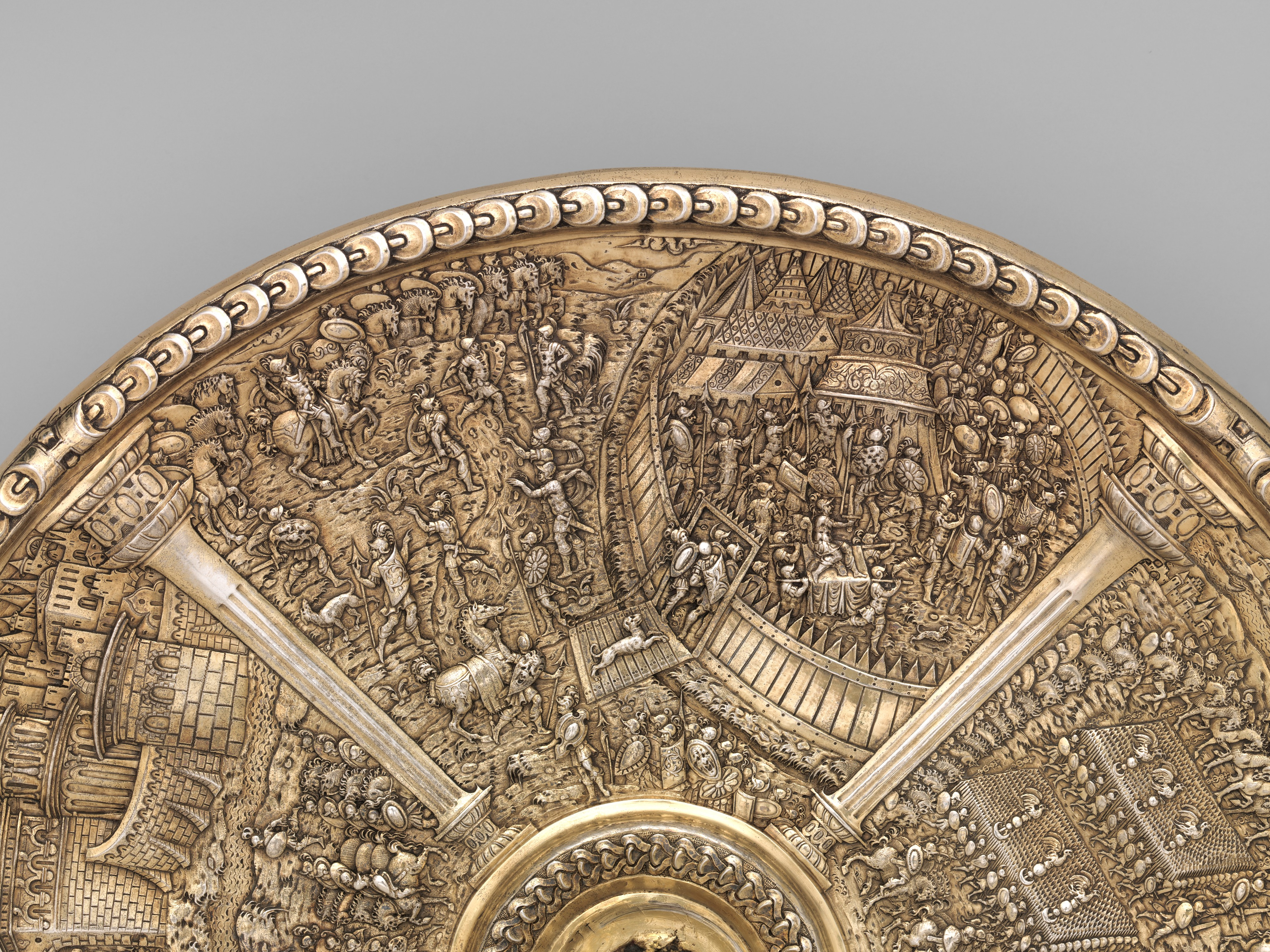
