= Hercules and Antaeus =

Sculpture by Antico

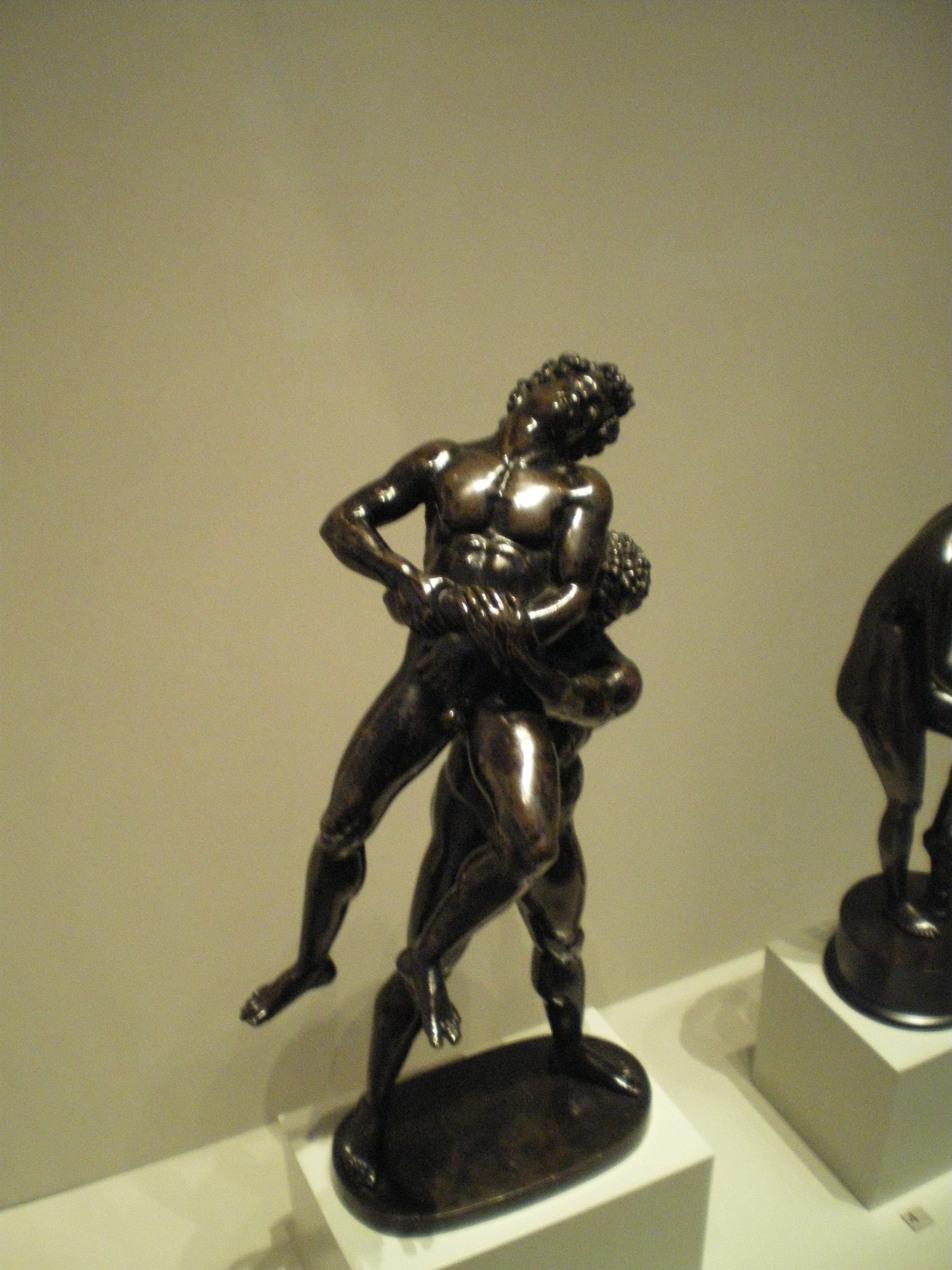
- Artist: Pier Jacopo Alari Bonacolsi (El Antico)
- Year: c. 1500–1510
- Catalogue: A.37–1956
- Type: bronze sculpture with silver gilding
- Dimensions: 40.8 cm × 22 cm (16.1 in × 8.7 in)
- Location: Victoria and Albert Museum, London
- Website: collections.vam.ac.uk/item/O94280/hercules-and-antaeus-figure-group-antico/

Hercules and Antaeus is an early 16th-century bronze sculpture by Pier Jacopo di Antonio Alari-Bonacolsi. The Gonzaga family court sculptor based this group on a classical marble of Hercules and Antaeus which is now in the Pitti Palace in Florence. The statue was given to the Victoria and Albert Museum by Walter Leo Hildburgh in 1956.
