= Léon Messagé =

French sculptor

Léon Messagé (1842-1901) was a French sculptor, best known for his sculptural collaboration with François Linke for the 1900 Paris Exposition Universelle. Messagé was also responsible for much of the design and creative work for Roux et Brunet and Joseph-Emmanuel Zwiener.

== Life ==
Messagé was born on 8 March 1842, probably in Sens in the Yonne where his parents continued to live, although his birth was not registered until twenty years later. By the age of twenty he was living in Paris, where he died in 1901.

== Career ==
Messagé enjoyed great success as a designer/sculptor before his collaboration with Linke. Indeed, he was mentioned as a gold medal winner at the 1889 International Exhibition and was especially praised for his work on a cabinet by Zwiener. He came into contact with Linke in 1885 and it appears from then on Linke employed him on a regular basis.

Messagé was primarily influenced by rococo ornament but he strove to re-interpret it. He did not produce slavish copies, and his original approach can be appreciated in Linke's celebrated Grande Bibliothèque and Grand Bureau exhibited at the 1900 Paris Exposition Universelle. A number of drawings by Messagé are recorded and after his success at the exhibition of 1889 he was encouraged to publish his designs. There were five sections to the book, with an elaborate title page surmounted by the sculptor's cipher or talisman of a wing, a pun on his own name as the messenger to the Gods, a motif he used many times on the handles of furniture designed for Linke.

As a sculptor Messagé was trained to produce a wax maquette or model prior to working on a piece. His maquettes were of the piece of furniture in its entirety, a rare and exacting task occasionally seen for eighteenth century French Royal commissions.

== Bibliography ==
Payne, Christopher, François Linke, 1855 - 1946, The Belle Époque of French Furniture, Antique Collectors' Club, (Woodbridge, UK); 2003, pp. 71–95.

Mestdagh, Camille, Pierre Lécoules, L'Ameublement d'art français: 1850-1900, Editions de l'Amateur; (Paris) 2010, pp. 173–176.

Adrian Alan Ltd, Makers Biographies(www.adrianalan.com/makers)
