= Walter Leo Hildburgh =

American art collector (1876–1955)

Walter Leo Hildburgh (1876-1955) was an American art collector, sportsman, traveller, scientist and philanthropist.

== Early life and education ==
Hildburgh was born in New York in 1876 into a family that had arrived in America earlier in the nineteenth century. He attended Columbia University, gaining a Ph.D. with a thesis on alternating current.

Of independent means, Hildburgh was able to continue his scientific studies without the need to earn a profit from his research. It also allowed him to pursue other interests: he was a first-rate swimmer and a figure-skater of international repute.

Hildburgh was also an active sportsman: he become an international-level figure-skater and swimmer and, later in life, served as a judge at the 1931 World Figure Skating Championships.

== Traveller and Collector ==
Hildburgh undertook his first trip abroad in 1900, taking a long trip through Japan, China and India. He also travelled extensively to Europe, the Middle East and Asia. Through his travels he began collecting: not only metalwork, decorative arts and sculpture but also folkloric objects such as amulets, which he bought up in "vast numbers". In 1902 he began keeping notebooks with his own ideas as well as literary quotations and information from art dealers. He mainly based himself in London from 1912 onwards and only briefly returned to America after that date.

By the time he was based in London, Hildburgh had begun to publish articles on his interests, particularly around the history of the applied arts. He would contribute to a wide variety of different journals, authoring over 300 articles and reviews.

Hildburgh was elected a Fellow of the Royal Anthropological Institute in 1906 and a Fellow of the Society of Antiquaries in 1915. He was awarded a D.Litt in the History of Art from the University of London in 1937.

== Folklorist ==
Hildburgh joined the Folklore Society in 1906, becoming one of its council members in 1909 and later its president from 1948 to 1951. In 1950, he presented incomplete set of copies of his articles to the Society's library, with a list of them in its journal Folklore later the same year.

In 1952 Hildburgh was awarded the Folklore Society's Coote Lake Medal "for his long and valuable service to folklore, notably in the field of amulets throughout the world".

He has been seen as a key figure at the Folklore Society in the immediate post-war period: "an excellent man of business; as long as he was about, the affairs of the Society, although always precarious, were kept in good order".

== Donor ==
Hildburgh was a major donor to museums. "His favourite method was to form a specialized collection, write a paper about it for a learned society, and then give it to the [V&A] Museum."

Hildburgh gave (or bequeathed) over 5,000 objects to the Victoria and Albert Museum (V&A), including the Hildburgh Madonna, Hercules and Antaeus, and one of the Aldobrandini Tazze, and examples of German, Dutch, Italian and Spanish silver- and gold-working In 1946, to mark his 70th birthday, Hildburgh presented to the V&A 300 examples of English alabaster reliefs.

A plaque in Hildburgh's memory was installed inside the main entrance (Room 60) of the V&A in 1957.An exhibition in his memory was displayed at the V&A from January to the end of March 1958.

To the British Museum Hildburgh gave the Cordoba Treasure as well as many other objects.

Hildburgh left his large collection of amulets to the Wellcome Historical Medical Museum. In 1985 this collection was transferred to the Pitt Rivers Museum.

Hildburgh also gave objects to other museums and collections such as the Metropolitan Museum of Art, the Cooper Hewitt and the UCL Institute of Archaeology.

== Selected works ==
=== Books ===
- Hildburgh, W. L (1936). Medieval Spanish enamels and their relation to the origin and the development of copper champlevé enamels of the twelfth and thirteenth centuries,. London: Oxford University Press, H. Milford. OCLC 829853.

=== Articles ===
- Hildburgh, W. L. (1900-05-01). "A New Electrolytic Cell For Rectifying Alternating Currents". Journal of the American Chemical Society. 22 (5): 300–304. doi:10.1021/ja02043a010. ISSN 0002-7863.
- Hildburgh, W. L. (1915). "65. Notes on Some Japanese Magical Methods for Injuring Persons". Man. 15: 116–121. doi:10.2307/2787870. ISSN 0025-1496.
- Hildburgh, W. L. (1917). "103. Note on a Magical Curative Practice in Use at Benares". Man. 17: 157–158. doi:10.2307/2788048. ISSN 0025-1496.
- Hildburgh, W. L. (1933). "Iconographical Peculiarities in English Medieval Alabaster Carvings. Part One". Folklore. 44 (1): 32–56. ISSN 0015-587X.
- Hildburgh, W. L. (1942). "Varieties of Circumstantial Evidence in the Study of Mediaeval Enameling". Speculum. 17 (3): 390–401. doi:10.2307/2853309. ISSN 0038-7134.
- Hildburgh, W. L. (1942-12-01). "Cowrie Shells as Amulets in Europe". Folklore. 53 (4): 178–195. doi:10.1080/0015587X.1942.9717654. ISSN 0015-587X.
- Hildburgh, W. L. (1946-12-01). "Apotropaism in Greek Vase-Paintings". Folklore. 57 (4): 154–178. doi:10.1080/0015587X.1946.9717831. ISSN 0015-587X.
- Hildburgh, W. L. (1946/10). "On Some Italian Renaissance Caskets with Pastiglia Decoration". The Antiquaries Journal. 26 (3–4): 123–137. doi:10.1017/S0003581500049891. ISSN 1758-5309.
- Hildburgh, W. L. (1948). "A Marble Relief Attributable to Donatello and Some Associable Stuccos". The Art Bulletin. 30 (1): 11–19. doi:10.2307/3047156. ISSN 0004-3079.
- Hildburgh, W. L. (1949). "II.—English Alabaster Carvings as Records of the Medieval Religious Drama". Archaeologia. 93: 51–101. doi:10.1017/S026134090000953X. ISSN 2051-3186.
- Hildburgh, W. L. (1951-03). "Psychology Underlying the Employment of Amulets in Europe". Folklore. 62 (1): 231–251. doi:10.1080/0015587X.1951.9718026. ISSN 0015-587X.
- Hildburgh, W. L. (1955). "Images of the Human Hand as Amulets in Spain". Journal of the Warburg and Courtauld Institutes. 18 (1/2): 67. doi:10.2307/750288.
