= Museu Medeiros e Almeida =

Museum in Lisbon, Portugal

- Location: Lisbon, Portugal
- Coordinates: 38°43′18″N 09°08′57″W
- Owner: Fundação Medeiros e Almeida
- Public transit access: Yes
- Parking: Yes
- Website: www.museumedeirosealmeida.pt?lang=en

The Medeiros e Almeida Museum is one of the most important Portuguese private decorative arts collections, gathered by the businessman, collector, and benefactor António de Medeiros e Almeida (1895–1986).

The museum, housed in Medeiros e Almeida's former residence, a late 19th-century manor located in the centre of Lisbon, is divided into two distinct areas: the residential area that was kept as it was during the collector's lifetime, and a purpose-built museum on the site of the former garden – the new wing – that recreates 18th-century French style interiors.

The museum's most striking quality lies in how different decorative elements have been harmoniously blended, from Chinese ceramics to Portuguese and French furniture, Dutch and Flemish paintings, watches and jewellery to textiles, silversmith, and fans.

== The collection ==
The museum has twenty-seven rooms and around two thousand works of art, including furniture, painting, sculpture, textiles, jewellery, ceramics, fans and sacred art. The objects cover the second century BC to the 20th century.

The collection is representative of Medeiros e Almeida's eclectic taste, with four main collections standing out: one of Portugal's most important clock collections, an important collection of porcelain Chinese Ceramics, a large and unique silverware collection and a collection of decorative fans.

=== Highlights ===
==== Chinese Art ====
- A set of Han (206 BC-AD 220) and Tang (618–790) dynasties mingqi burial vessels;
- Seven Ming (1368–1644) dynasty, early 16th-century, porcelain vessels for the Portuguese market, known as first orders;
- A Qing dynasty, Qianlong period (1736–1795), c.1750–1760, marked imperial vase with auspicious decoration and the molded figures of two European tribute-bearers;
- Two Qing dynasty, Kangxi period (1662–1722) nefrite chime stones (sonorous stones), dated 1717, belonging to an imperial musical set;
- A rare Kangxi period, late 17th century, monumental six-panel, birthday gift, Coromandel lacquer screen decorated with poems and an inscription.

==== Clocks and Watches ====
- A mid-17th century Gdansk, amber hourglass, signed: Michael Scödelock fecit;
- A rare c.1675-1685, night clock by the English royal clockmaker, Edward East (1602–1696);
- 1700, longcase, grandfather, month clock by Thomas Tompion (1639-1713);
- A curious c.1720-1730, flintlock system, table alarm clock made to the German market by Godfrie Poy (active 1718–1753);
- An 1807 pocket watch, table, and carriage clock that belonged to French general Junot and later on to the Duke of Wellington, by the master horology Abraham-Louis Breguet (1747–1823);
- A 1900 Grand Régulateur, ormolu mounted, grandfather clock by François Linke.

==== Furniture ====
- Two Louis XIV ormolu-mounted tortoiseshell and engraved brass marquetry bureau Mazarin, c.1690, by French cabinet-maker André-Charles Boulle (1642–1732);
- A pair of rocaille commodes, 1720–1730, marked Antoine Criaerd (act. 1720–50);
- A “vernis-Martin” commode, 1745–1755, attb. to French cabinet-maker Pierre Roussel (1723–1782);
- A writing table (desk), 1854–1857, by the English cabinet-maker John Webb (1799–1880);
- A cartonnier desk, signed and dated 1892, by Joseph-Emmanuel Zwiener (1849-c.1925);
- “Mars & Venus”An ormolu-mounted “Mars & Venus” cabinet signed and dated by the French cabinet-maker François Linke (1855–1935), made for the Universal Exhibition of Paris of 1900 signed and dated 1900;
- A Louis XV style, ormolu mounted console by French cabinet-maker François Linke (1855–1935), signed LF, circa 1900.

==== Painting ====
- “The Halt” by Flemish painter Jan Brueghel (1568–1625);
- “The Tax Collector”, 1616, by Flemish painter Pieter Brueghel the Younger (1564–1638);
- A set of 8 land and seascapes, 1623 to 1652, by the Dutch landscapist Jan van Goyen (1596–1656);
- “Old Man with a sword”, 1768, by the Italian master Gian-Domenico Tiepolo (1727–1804);
- “Archimedes”, c.1630, attributed to Jose Ribera’s workshops (1588–1652);
- “Still Life”, 1643–1644, by the Dutch painter Jan Davidsz de Heem (1606–1684);
- “Queen Catarina of Bragança”, 1670, attributed to the British painter John Riley (1646–1691);
- “The Birth of Adonis“; “The Death of Adonis”, c.1720–30, by François Boucher (1703–1770);
- “Mrs. William Fitzroy”, 1801–1808, attributed to the English painter John Hoppner (1758–1810);
- “Amedée Berny d’Ouville”, 1830, signed and dated by the French painter Eugène Delacroix (1798–1863).

== The museum ==
=== Entrance gallery ===
The former residence entrance was accessible through a small though imposing flight of marble stairs. It opens up to a central corridor that connects the main reception rooms and gives access to the upper floor, where the private apartments were located.

The entrance gallery displays a relevant set of oils on wood by Jan van Goyen, quite illustrative of the aesthetic evolution of one of the first Dutch landscapists.

=== Dining room ===
In this room, the Medeiros e Almeida couple welcomed family, friends, and many Portuguese and foreign social, political, and high finance guests.

The room has preserved its original 19th-century British-style decoration. The mahogany dining table is set for twelve people, as for a gala dinner, with a silver dinner service by the celebrated silversmith Paul Storr (1770–1844), and a set of gold-decorated crystal glasses from the French Daum factory, on lace coeval placemats.

On one of the tops, there is an unusually large cupboard, made of glass-panelled sections, displaying some of the collection's sets of Chinese porcelain dinner services used on festive occasions, a rare set of early 19th century British and Irish prismatic cut crystal vessels, and a collection of glass and biscuit cameo pieces, from the beginning of Portuguese Vista Alegre factory production (1837–1846).

Four 17th-century Dutch still lifes make up the decor.

=== Silverware room ===
The old scullery exhibits nowadays the Portuguese and British silver collection displayed in cabinets. The British silversmith highlight is the set of Paul Storr (1771–1838) tableware vessels decorated with fauna and flora elements, and the most important Portuguese item is the tea and coffee service, by António Firmo da Costa, produced in 1815, engraved with Napoleon Bonaparte's monogram that served the deposed emperor while in Saint Helena Island;

Two Portuguese collections of figure shaped toothpick holders can be admired in this space; made of Portuguese silver and Vista Alegre Manufactory porcelain.

=== The office ===
In his office, the collector dedicated some time to reading books, art magazines, and auction catalogues, indulging his passion, trying to broaden his knowledge in the areas that interested him most, or finding one more artwork to complete his collection.

Mr. Medeiros e Almeida and his wife Margarida as well as other family members' portraits, painted by Portuguese painters, can also be admired here.

=== The private apartments ===
In the private apartments, the bedroom and the private bathroom of António Medeiros e Almeida have been kept intact, exhibiting his gym equipment, which he ordered from the US in the ’70s.

An unusual 1740–1750, mahogany cabinet, by John Channon (1711–1783), that was used to keep Mr. Almeida’s personal medicines can be admired in the antechamber as well as a Portuguese rosewood daybed, c.1775, among paintings portraying Lisbon by the Portuguese painter Carlos Botelho (1899–1982), who was the collector’s high school colleague.

=== New Gallery ===
In this gallery Jean Berain’s le Vieux decorative motifs can be seen on the two André-Charles Boulle “mazarin” bureau desks, on the pair of mythological paintings by the French painter François Boucher and on the two 1730s French tapestries that belong to a set known as “The Grotesques” that represents fanciful architectures, fauna, flora, dancers and acrobats.

=== The piano room ===
This room is a recreation of a Louis XV ambience and owes its name to the 19th century ormolu-mounted grand piano by Erard (1880–1890), It is lined with carved oak panelling and a Portuguese chestnut caisson ceiling, painted with colourful scenes depicting daily life. The white marble fireplace belonged to Somerset Maugham's house in London.

Paintings by Giovanni Domenico Tiepolo (1727–1804), a portrait by George Romney (1734–1802), or the Resurrection of Lazarus by the Dutch painter Jacob Willemz de Wet (ab 1610- after 1677) are also shown in this space.

=== Louis XIV room ===
The room owes its name to two pieces of furniture by the French royal cabinet maker André-Charle Boulle: a monumental table clock surmounted by a barometer on a pedestal and a table secretary (bureau-plat). The room is lined with Italian panels (boiserie) painted with green ground grotesque-flavoured scenes.

An important set of four late 19th century Austrian Viennese Historismus vessels is worth the attention in this gallery: An engraved rock crystal, silver and enamel coffer, a three piece clock and candle holder garniture, a figure-shaped mythological, two headed bird and a rock crystal cornucopia.

=== Lake room ===
This room, like its adjoining Upper and Lower galleries, evokes the garden that existed before the construction of the museum's New Wing. Hence the presence of water in a 19th-century Italian fountain in the centre of the room. The walls are lined with blue and white tile panels depicting the Four Seasons and the Four Continents, favourite subjects of the Baroque era.

The Portuguese 18th century caisson ceiling is decorated with colourful paintings representing the Four Continents.

=== Clocks and watches room ===
This room features about 200 watches and clocks, out of a total of about 600 pieces in the collection. The examples are displayed chronologically, telling the story of the evolution of watchmaking in Europe. The collection includes several types: pocket watches, table clocks, bracket clocks, long case clocks, hanging clocks, carriage clocks, marine as well as sun, sand and fire clocks....

=== Porcelain room ===
A dedicated room houses Medeiros e Almeida's Chinese ceramics collection. The first showcase displays the terracotta and proto porcelain collection, including pieces from the Han, Tang, Wei and Song dynasties.

The second vitrine exhibits Ming dynasty pieces, among which the so-called “first orders”, referring to the very first orders made by Europeans – the Portuguese – to Chinese porcelain makers in the early 16th century. The pieces, bearing Portuguese symbols such as the armillary sphere, King Manuel I's insignia and the Portuguese Coat of Arms, belong to an extremely rare group of porcelain painted in cobalt blue under the glaze and produced to the export market.

The Qing dynasty is represented with both inner market vessels and export market enamel pieces from the Kangxi, Yongzheng and the Qianlong period, such as dinner sets inspired by western/European ceramic decoration and forms.

Pieces marked on the base with imperial marks, made for the domestic market, stand out, such as a large vase painted with auspicious symbology, dating from 1760 to 1790, supported by two small male figures, depicted on their knees or a vase painted in gold and decorated with medallions of polychrome flowers, with a large bow in the bulge on which a child is supported, dated 1670–1680.

=== Chapel ===
This gallery keeps the religious artworks. The monumental mid-18th century Indo-Portuguese pulpit, made of carved, multi-colored painted wood, is originally from the Church of Our Lady of Monte in Velha Goa, in India. The room also holds a set of display cabinets containing religious vestments, including an embroidered velvet antependium from 1592, pluvials and six silk brocade and lace chasubles from the 18th and 19th centuries. On the bottom of the room, there is a Portuguese 18th century carved and gilded wood altar piece surrounded by Portuguese silversmith artworks, carved Nottingham alabaster pieces and Flemish wood reliefs.

== The building ==
The building at 6 rua Mouzinho da Silveira dates back to 1896. The house is located in a central area of Lisbon, next to the recently opened Avenida da Liberdade (1886). With four floors – basement, ground floor, first floor and attic – and a garden area, the 19th-century Parisian-like design perfectly fits the surrounding architecture. In 1921, the house was sold, and some renovations took place, including the addition of a garage, another floor, a turret with a lift and a slate roof, giving the building its current exterior appearance.

=== Acquisition by Medeiros e Almeida: 1943–1965 ===
On 22 December 1943, Medeiros e Almeida and his wife, living on Rua do Salitre, purchased the house, which was close to António's parents home, no. 12 on the same street.

Medeiros e Almeida hired the prestigious architect Carlos Chambers d’Oliveira Ramos (1897–1969) to carry out the remodelling and improvements necessary for the couple to move in.

As his first official act in June 1946, the oratory was inaugurated in a ceremony presided by the Patriarch of Lisbon, Cardinal Cerejeira (1888–1977).

=== The New Wing ===
In the mid-1960s, Medeiros e Almeida had already gathered an important collection of decorative arts, which he had decided to bequeath to his country. In 1968, began implementing the project to set up a museum, which included transforming his residence.

To keep the entire collection together and aware that it would continue to grow and needed more exhibition space, AMA ordered the construction of a new wing in the garden.

For the expansion project, the collector hired architect Alberto Cruz (1920–1990), the new wing consisted of two floors in a total area of around 950 m2. With this extension, the future institution was formed by different areas: the residence with fourteen rooms, and the new wing, made up of thirteen new spaces.

The extension work and the set-up of the House Museum were concluded in 1974 by architects Frederico George (1915–1994) and José Sommer Ribeiro (1924–2006). The latter was also responsible for the museum project. In accordance with the dedication and care he put into everything he was involved with, Medeiros e Almeida supervised the project in person.

=== The Medeiros e Almeida Museum ===
In 1989, according to a first project for opening the museum to the public, a construction campaign work was undertaken in order to provide it with the most up-to-date museum equipment and accoutrements, including a preventive conservation project (Eng. Elias Casanovas), as well as a lighting project (Eng. Vítor Vajão). The first catalogue of the collections was published in 1994.

It was in 1999 that new impetus was given to opening the museum to the public, with the set-up of a permanent team, the creation of a museum itinerary and the implementation of a programme. Fifteen years after the death of Medeiros e Almeida, the museum opened its doors, on the 1st of June 2001.

== The foundation ==
On the 23 June 1924, Medeiros e Almeida married Margarida Pinto Basto. They moved into a house on Rua Mouzinho da Silveira in Lisbon and started to buy artworks to decorate their new residence. Their collection expanded rapidly after World War II as the post-war period provided a particularly good opportunity for collectors with money to enhance their collections as prices were low. The couple quickly became recognised as major art collectors.

His wife died in 1971. The couple were childless, which is why they had decided to donate their property and collection to a foundation, the Medeiros e Almeida Foundation, which runs the museum. The idea of the House—Museum was to keep all of the collection together. In 1971 Medeiros e Almeida requested experts from the Calouste Gulbenkian Foundation to carry out a first inventory of his collection. A final inventory would not be completed until after his death. Medeiros e Almeida directed the work of the foundation until his death on 12 February 1986. Aware that, in the absence of financial resources, the museum would find it difficult to survive without selling some of the contents, Medeiros e Almeida left in his will instructions as to how the foundation would survive. He arranged for his shares in all of his companies to be sold, with the resulting money being used to build a property close to the museum that should be rented out, with the rent being used to support the functioning of the museum. That arrangement continues to work satisfactorily to the present.

== Gallery ==
Louis XIV Room

Dining room

Sala do Lago, with a central fountain, azulejo panels, and a painted ceiling

Apollo personifying summer (Estio) in an azulejo panel from the Four Seasons series in the Sala do Lago

Samson Slaying a Philistine, a plaster-coated lead sculpture attributed to John van Nost, after a model by Giambologna

Veritas, a marble sculpture by Raffaelle Monti, 1853

Indo-Portuguese pulpit basin in carved, painted teak from Old Goa

François Linke’s Mars and Venus cabinet, made for the 1900 Paris Exposition
