= Narciso Ferreira =

Portuguese entrepreneur (1862–1933)

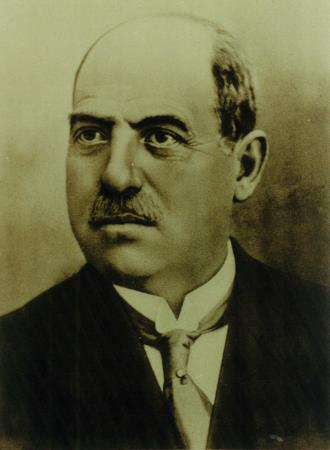
- Born: Narciso Ferreira; July 7, 1862; Pedome, Portugal
- Died: 23 March 1933 (aged 70); Riba de Ave, Portugal
- Occupations: Entrepreneur; industrial; philanthropist
- Spouse: Eva Rosa de Oliveira Ferreira (1861–1913)
- Children: Delfim Ferreira (1888–1960); Raúl Ferreira (1895–1974), Count of Riba d'Ave; Etc.
- Parents: António Ferreira (father); Maria Sampaio (mother)
- Awards: Commander of the Order of Industrial Merit (1928); Grand Officer of the Order of Merit (1929); Grand Cross of the Order of Industrial Merit (1930)

Narciso Ferreira ComMI, GOM, GCMI (7 July 1862 – 23 March 1933) was a Portuguese entrepreneur in the north of Portugal (Riba d’Ave, in Vila Nova de Famalição).

He is considered the great founder of the textile industry in Portugal and responsible for the introduction of electric power supply in the North of the country.

== Biography ==
He had started by selling the fabrics he himself manufactured at fairs around Riba de Ave, where he was born.

— Maria Filomena Mónica, quoted in Diário de Notícias

He was the son of a farmers family. Since his father died when he was very young, his mother gave him a severe education. Seduced by the industrialization in the end of the 19th century, he was only nineteen years old when he set two looms in the farm house where they lived in Pedome. The production was sold in fairs and markets in the north of the country. Afterwards, he made friends with merchants an bankers and soon became very known and respected in the business world. Around 1887 he buys a groundplot on the edge of the river Ave in Riba d’Ave and he sets the first factory in 1890 with forty looms. In 1894 he establishes a commercial society together with Manuel Joaquim Oliveira, José Augusto Dias (banker), Ortgão de Sampaio (engineer) and José Fernandes, named Sampaio Ferreira & Cia. Lda., with 200 power looms, powered by a weir built on the river. Other factories were built later with the collaboration of his eldest sons, José, Delfim, Alfredo, Joaquim and Raúl. He employed approximately 12.000 workers in the region.

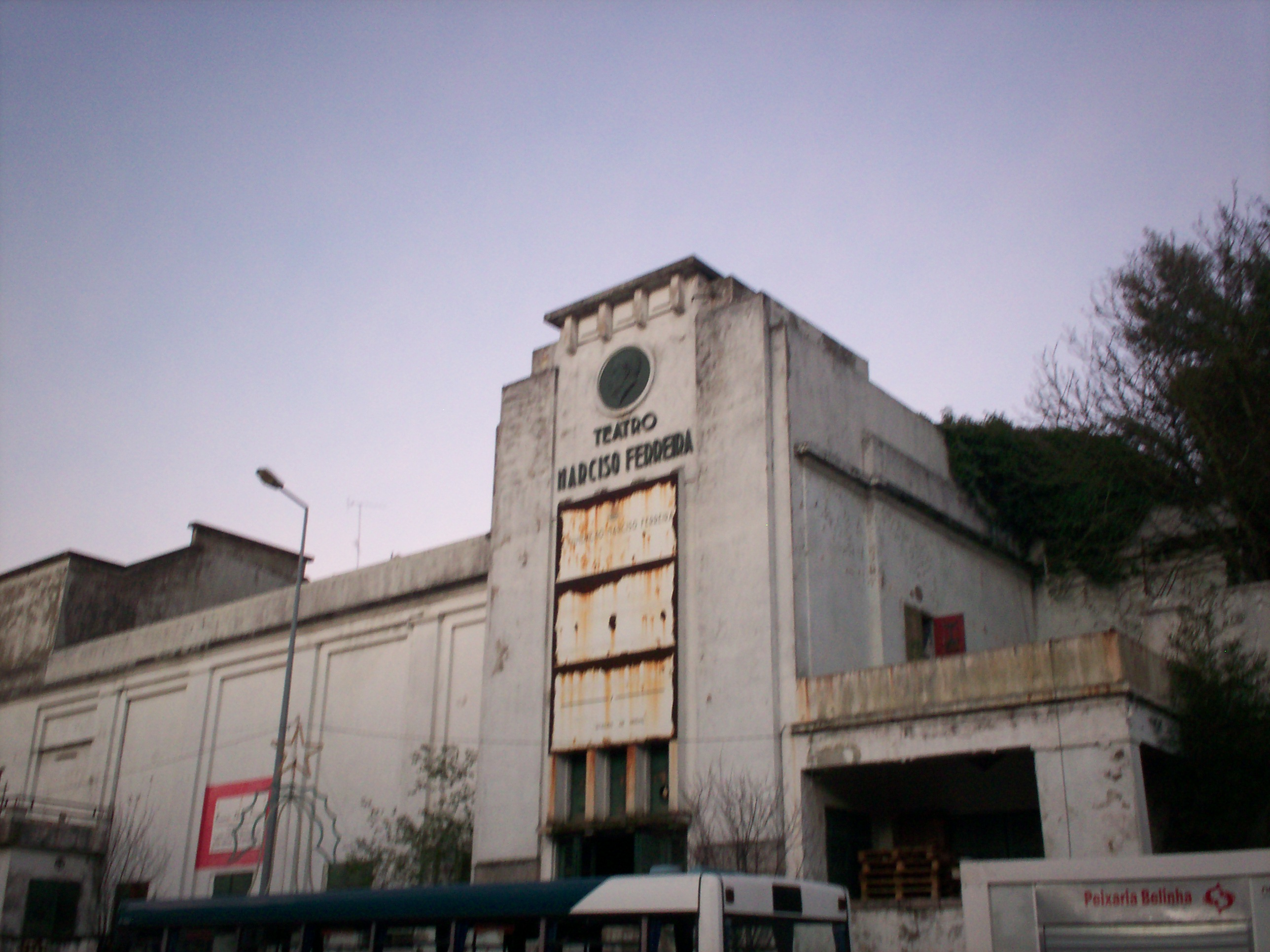
Teatro Narciso Ferreira in Riba de Ave, Portugal

His family created the Narciso Ferreira Foundation in 1945.

== Tributes ==
- Narciso Ferreira Hospital (1933);
- Theater Narciso Ferreira (1944);
- Narciso Ferreira Foundation (1945);
- Monument to Narciso Ferreira (1949);
- Narciso Ferreira Avenue (Riba de Ave), Narciso Ferreira Alameda (Riba de Ave) etc.
