= António de Medeiros e Almeida =

Portuguese businessman (1895–1986)

António de Medeiros e Almeida ComC; OB; ComB; GOMAI; GCMAI; OBE; OMC
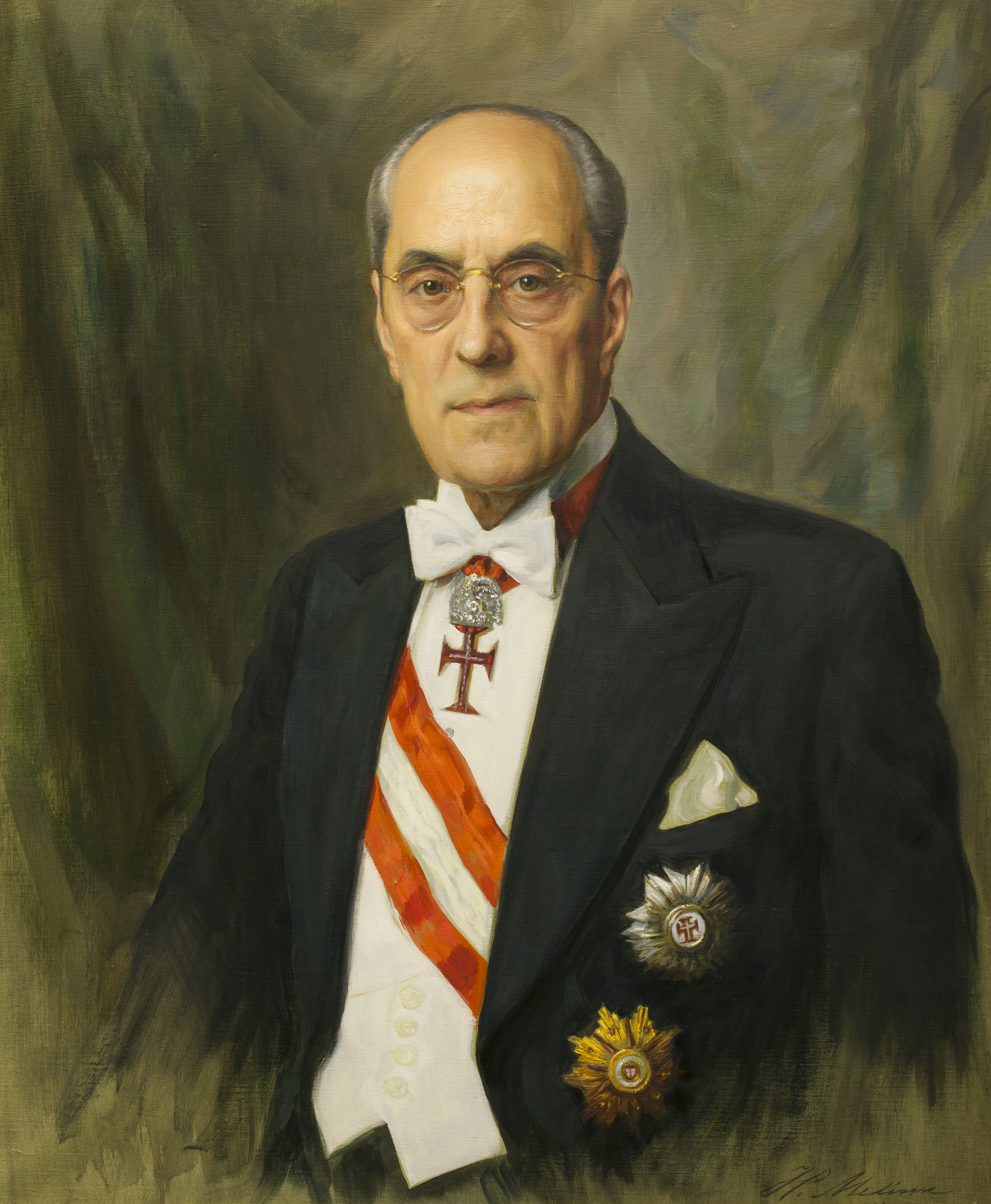
- Born: 17 September 1895; Lisbon, Portugal
- Died: 19 February 1986 (aged 90)
- Occupation(s): businessman, industrialist, collector and benefactor

António de Medeiros e Almeida (1895–1986), ComC; OB; ComB; GOMAI; GCMAI; OBE; OMC, was a Portuguese businessman, industrialist, collector and benefactor. He created the Medeiros e Almeida Foundation to bequeath his collection of decorative arts to his country.

== Youth and marriage ==
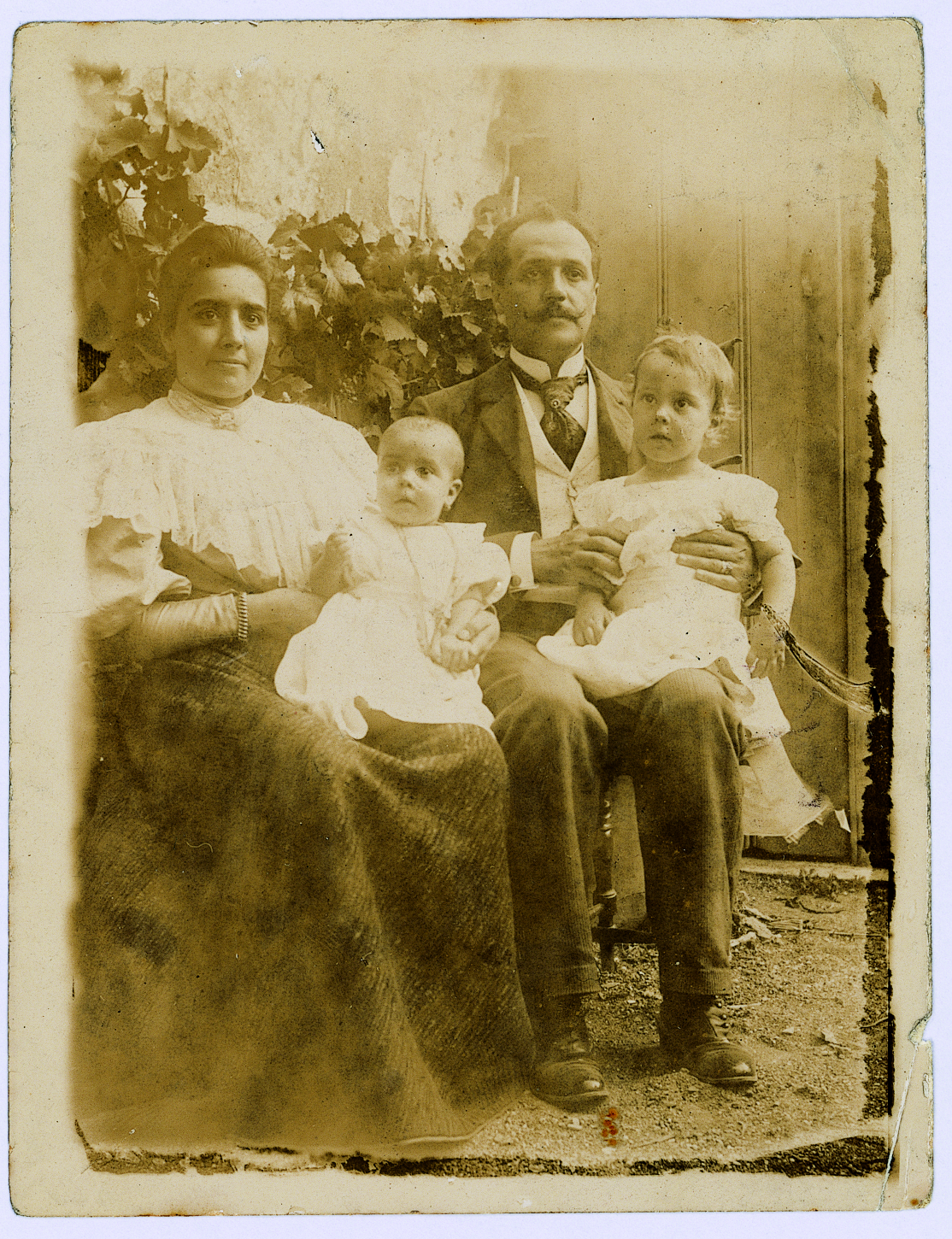
AMA with his parents and brother Gustavo

António de Medeiros e Almeida was born on 17 September 1895 in rua do Salitre (no. 405) in Lisbon, Portugal. He was the eldest son of João Silvestre de Almeida (1866–1936) and his wife Maria Amélia Tavares Machado de Medeiros (1870–1952), both from the São Miguel Island in the Azores.

Brought up in a prosperous household, António Medeiros e Almeida attended primary education in the Académica School. He went on to the Central Lyceum of Lapa in Lisbon (which gave rise to the Lyceum Pedro Nunes) and to the Passos Manuel Lyceum.

After high school, in 1914, he enrolled in the Faculty of Medicine of Lisbon. The following year he asked to be transferred to Coimbra, where he would carry out his military service. Towards the end of 1917, after having completed the third year of medicine, his interest in the business world made him give up medicine and travel to Germany for a work experience returning to Lisbon a year later.

On 23 June 1924 he married Margarida Rita de Jesus de Castelbranco Ferreira Pinto Basto (1898 – 1971) and moved to 134, rua do Salitre (the same street where he was born).

== Businessman ==
=== Automobiles ===
In 1921 Medeiros e Almeida bought, along with a friend, his first car, a Morris Cowley. Passionate about cars, he participated in automobile races, namely in the circuit of Rampa da Pimenteira.

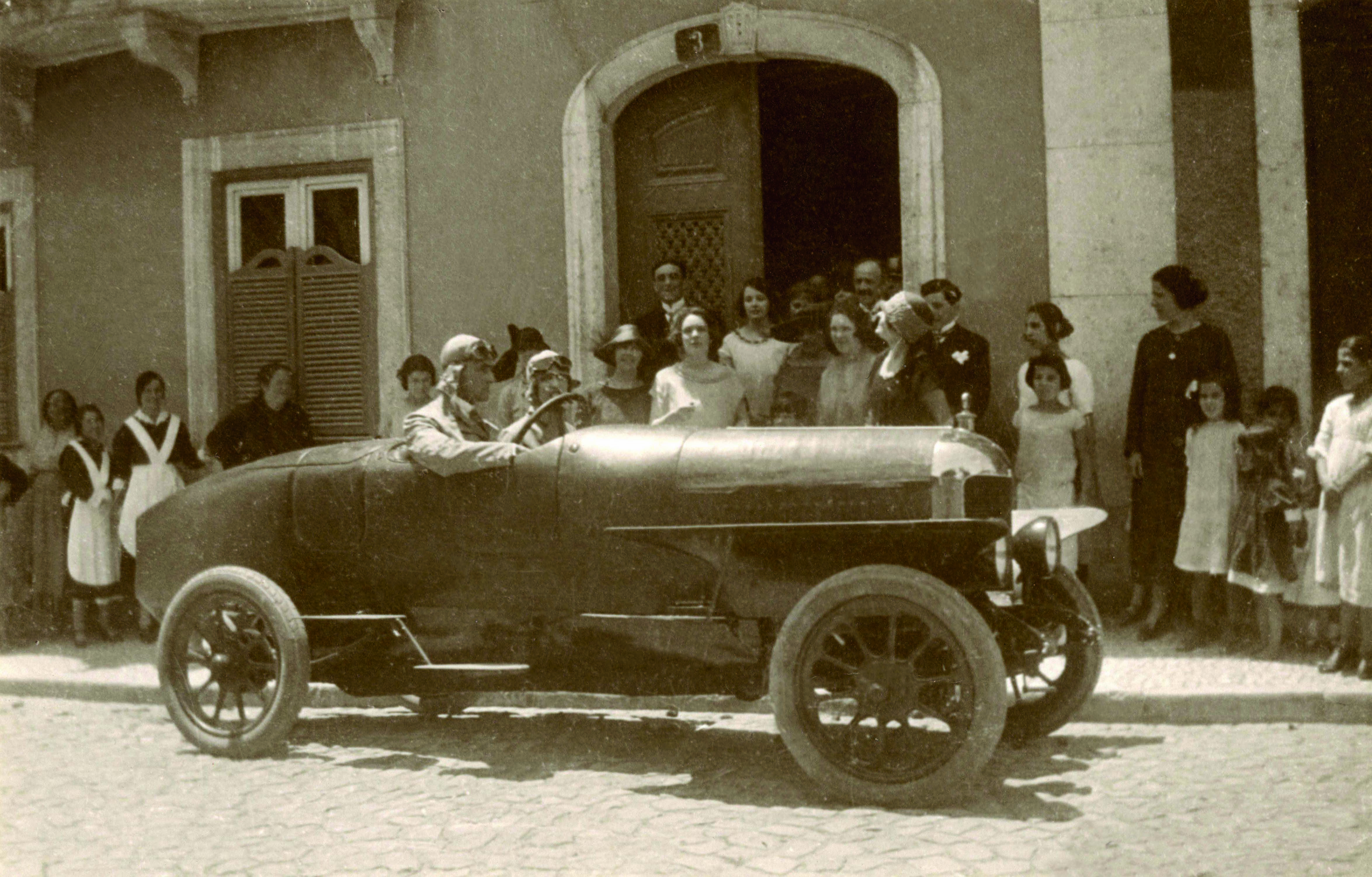
The Medeiros e Almeida couple departing on their honeymoon 1924

António Medeiros e Almeida decided early on to invest in the import of automobiles, an activity that was still in its beginnings in Portugal. He established contact with the English manufacturer William Morris (1877 - 1963), whom he asked for the consignation of the first cars. Having appreciated the young entrepreneur's pledge of his word as a guarantee, Lord Nuffield gave him a vote of confidence and he became, from 1923 onwards, the importer of Morris, Mg, Wolseley e Riley for Portugal, opening a stand - A.M. Almeida Lda. - in rua da Escola Politécnica 39-39A, in Lisbon to sell the cars. In 1926 he became the Morris exclusive importer for Portugal.

Initially, the business did not go exactly as the businessman had hoped. English cars did not drive well on Portugal's cobblestone roads. An alteration in the cars’ suspension in 1932, with the arrival of the Morris Ten model, led sales to soar and the business to prosper.

To provide after-sales assistance, he opened a Morris service station at Conde Barão garage and a parts and accessories store in the nearby area.

In 1955, A.M. Almeida was dissolved having been replaced by another firm with the same name, extended, now to other partners and intending to import other car brands beyond the Morris group. In this new company, António Medeiros e Almeida was no longer the figurehead, remaining, however, linked to this business: “…in 1955 I sold my fraction in the firm A.M. Almeida created by me, and I can say that the automobile business was the indicator and promoter of what is today the Medeiros e Almeida Foundation.”

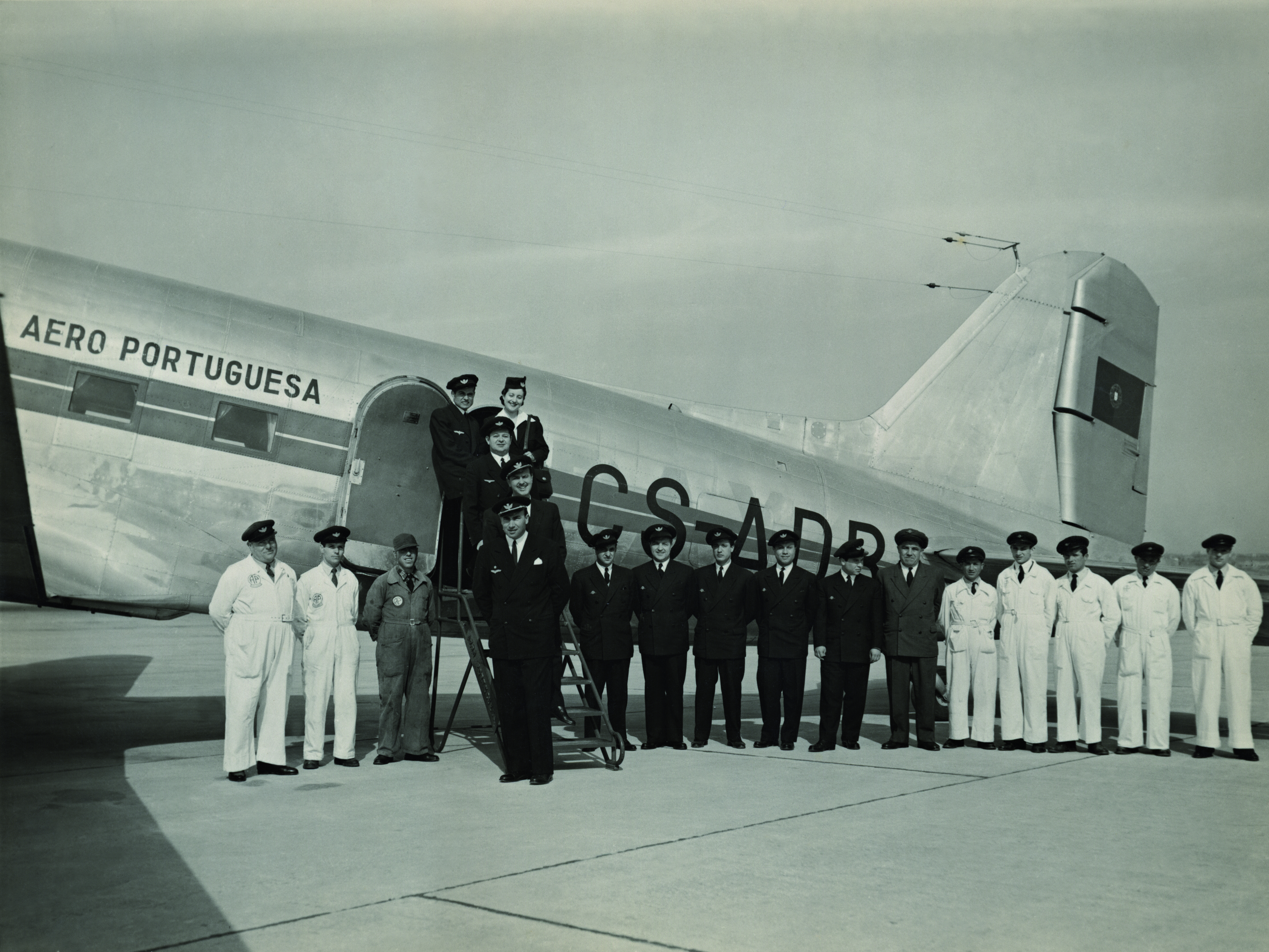
Aero Portuguesa - crew Douglas DC-3 CS-ADB.

Later, in 1962, he was one of those responsible for the creation of the Citroën car factory, in Mangualde, of which he became chairman of the board of directors.

=== Aero Portuguesa ===
An enthusiast of speed and technology, António Medeiros e Almeida was one of the pioneers of civil aviation in Portugal.

In 1941 as the administrator of Bensaúde & C. ª, he was one of five Azorean investors who bet on the creation of the Sociedade Açoriana de Estudos Aéreos Limitada (SAEAL), to create aerial connections between Lisbon and the archipelago (nowadays SATA).

In May 1948, he bought Aero Portuguesa, a regular air traffic company, founded back in 1934, that was struggling with financial problems.

Initially, Aero Portuguesa continued to chart an airplane from Air France, for the flights from Portugal to North Africa. Later, Medeiros e Almeida purchased this plane from Air France, for 38 thousand dollars, an irrefutable sum in a war-torn Europe.

After the purchase, he started to improve the passenger experience ordering, for the first time in Portugal, music and blue glass shields to be installed, so that passengers could enjoy the view without being disturbed by the sun. Aiming at maximizing the safety and comfort of its passengers, Medeiros e Almeida also hired, for the first time, a full cabin crew with a pilot, a co-pilot, a mechanic, a telegraph operator, and a flight attendant.

Despite the high profitability of his company, in 1953 Medeiros e Almeida decided to merge it with TAP (which had been created in 1945). Conscious that his sixty employees could be put in jeopardy and left destitute, Medeiros e Almeida set the condition that his employees were all to be hired by TAP. He would remain one of TAP's main shareholders and chairman of the Board of Directors of the company, a position he would hold until 1960 when he decided to leave and transfer the capital he held to SATA.

=== Azores – Alcohol, Sugar, Bensaúde & C. ª ===
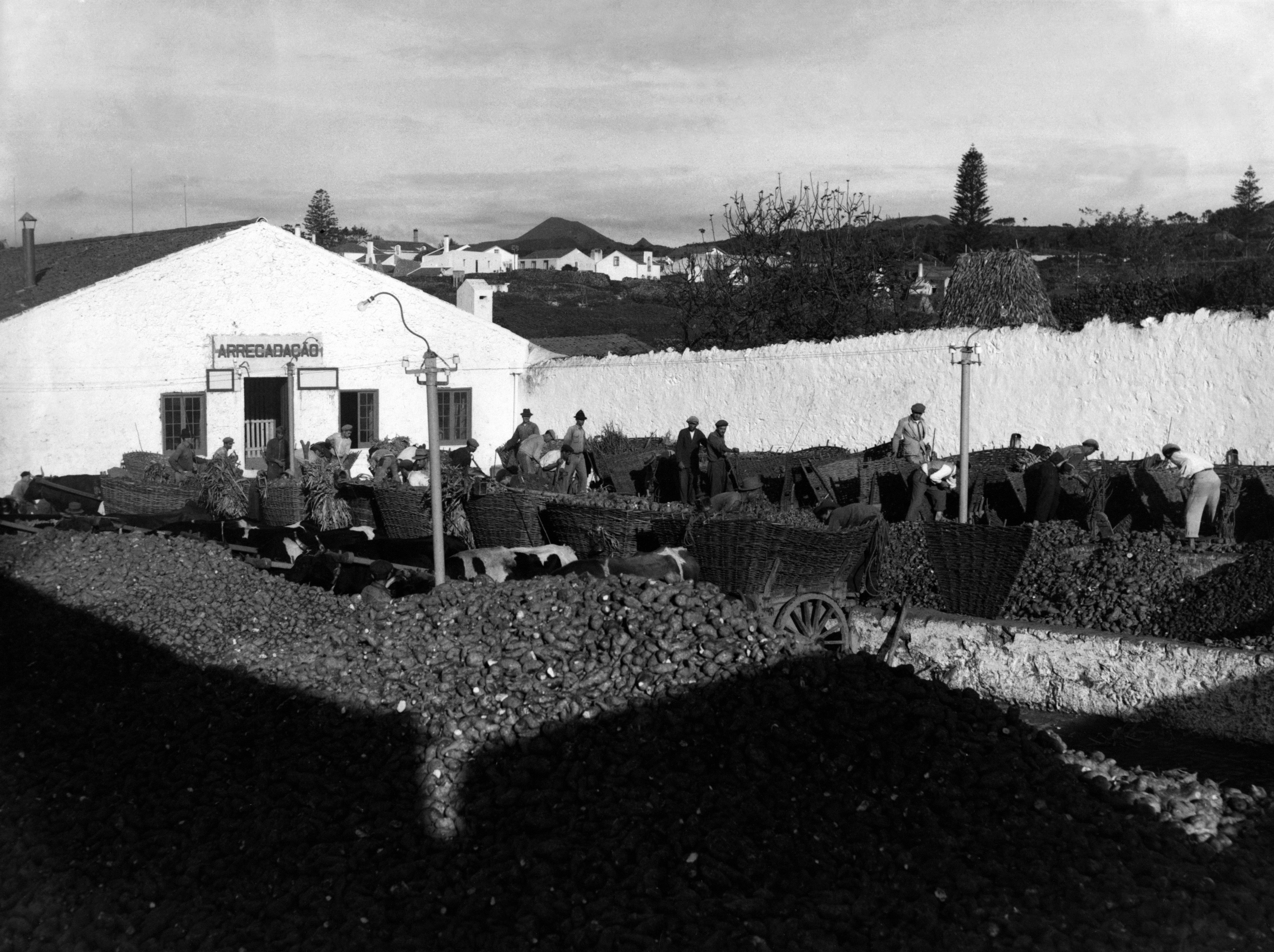
Transportation of sugar beet in the Factory of Santa Clara, Azores

In the early 1940s, António Medeiros e Almeida was already a prestigious businessman, who successfully managed his car company and the Azorean businesses inherited by his father's death in 1936, including participation in the União das Fábricas Açorianas de Alcohol (UFAA), factories that produced industrial alcohol and sugar from sugar beet molasses. In 1967, the businessman founded SINAGA - Sociedade de Indústrias Agrícolas Açoreanas SARL, which had two factories on the island of São Miguel, Santa Clara (sugar) and Lagoa (alcohol), and was chairman of the Board of Directors until his death.

=== Bensaúde & C. ª ===
As part of the business connection with the Azores archipelago, he dealt closely with Vasco Elias Bensaúde (1896 - 1967), owner of Bensaúde & C. ª, a business group founded in 1820, with which the Medeiros e Almeida family had business together. The spectre of a German invasion during the Second World War, led Vasco Bensaúde, of Jewish origin, to offer a partnership to António Medeiros e Almeida. In 1941 he temporarily transferred the entire family business share to his friend, who assumed the role of managing partner of the company. At the end of the war, the shares were returned to their owners and later, in 1965, Medeiros e Almeida asked Vasco Bensaúde to find his replacement so that he could depart from the business world and dedicate himself to the transformation of his house into a museum. His departure from Bensaúde & C. ª would only take place in 1967, after Vasco's death.

“Funchal” steamer inauguration, Empresa Insulana de Navegação – António de Medeiros e Almeida and Vasco Bensaúde, February 1961

Over the twenty-six years he was at the forefront of this Azorean emporium, Medeiros e Almeida was responsible for the economic growth of the firm, simultaneously managing ”... twenty-one companies, all of them making a profit”.

Among these were the Açoriana de Transportes Aéreos (SATA), Banco Micaelense, Companhia de Seguros Açoreana, Fuel Oil Station, JH Ornelas & C. ª, Mutualista Açoriana, Varela & C. ª and Society of Coal and Supplies of Faial. The airport on the Island of Santa Maria, officially opened in 1945, owes its existence to the efforts of Medeiros e Almeida.

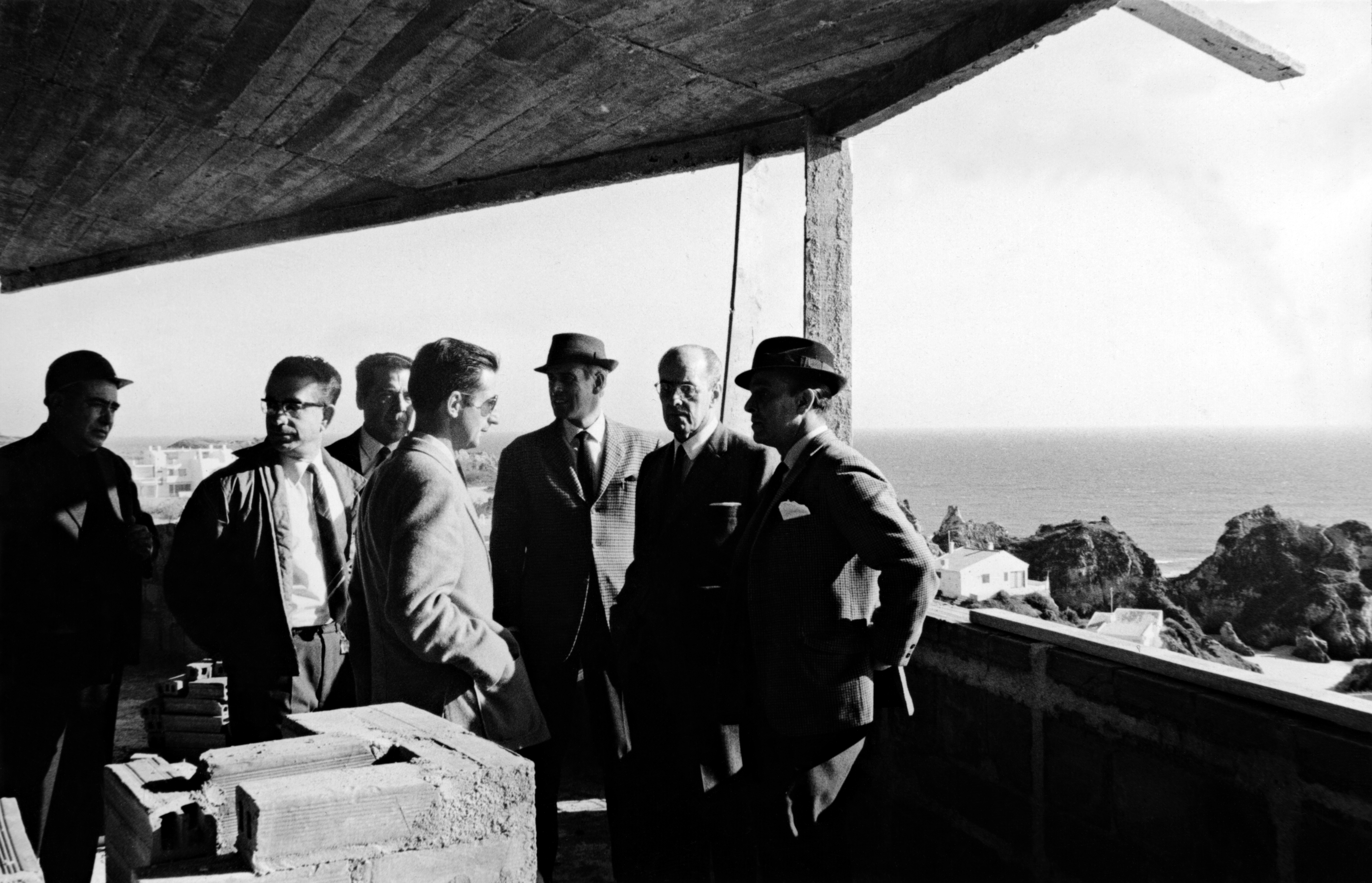
The construction of the Hotel Alvor

=== Hotels ===
In 1952, Oliveira Salazar, thinking that Lisbon lacked a large international hotel, asked the banker Ricardo do Espírito Santo Silva to take over the project. In 1953, SODIM was created by a consortium of Portuguese bankers and industrialists including António Medeiros e Almeida, Vasco Bensaúde, Manuel de Mello, António Manuel de Almeida, Caetano Sanguinetti Beirão da Veiga, Manuel Cordo Bulhosa and José Eduardo de Barros Guedes de Sousa to build the hotel.

The architect Porfírio Pardal Monteiro worked with others on the project, namely Jorge Ferreira Chaves and with the most famous visual artist of the time such as Almada Negreiros, Jorge Vieira, Querubim Lapa, Sarah Afonso, Lagoa Henriques, Carlos Botelho, Jorge Barradas and Fred Kradolfer who contributed to the hotel's interior design.

Medeiros e Almeida was also a partner of the CUF Group at SALVOR Sociedade de Investimento Hoteleiro S.A.R.L., a company established in 1963 and responsible for the construction of the Alvor Hotel in the Algarve, a project by the architect Carlos Ramos (1897-1969).

== Honours ==
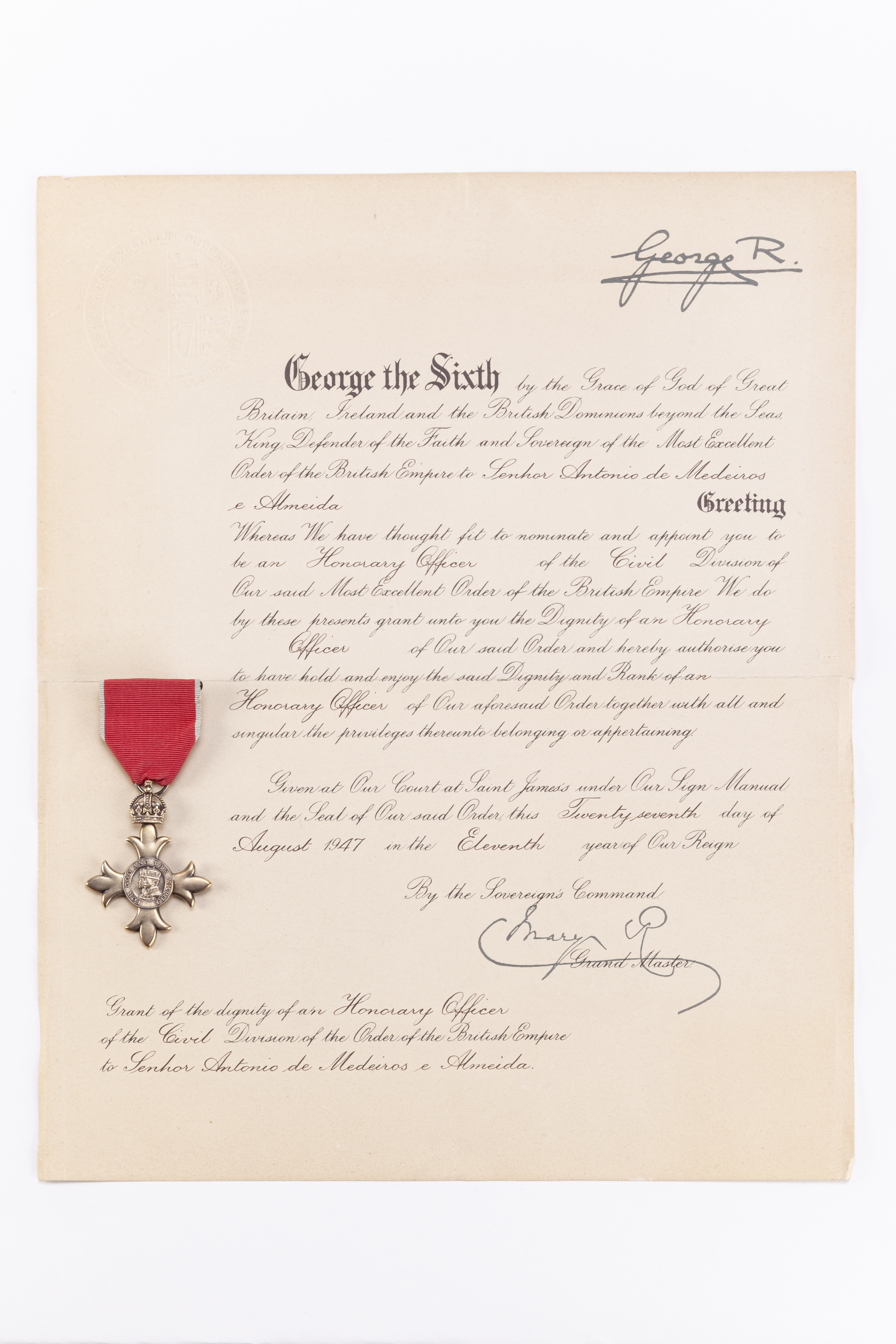
Order British Empire awarded to António de Medeiros e Almeida

During the Second World War, António Medeiros e Almeida, became a personal friend of Sir Ronald Hugh Campbell (1883-1953), British ambassador to Lisbon between 1941 and 1947. Over this period, he helped his diplomat friend on several occasions, mediating the tensions between Winston Churchill and Oliveira Salazar over the negotiations regarding the Lajes airbase in the Azores. During this period Medeiros e Almeida allowed the English the use of the Azorean port terminals of Companhia Insulana de Navegação, as well as supplying their ships with fuel and reparation works.

In recognition of his help during the troubled period of the Second World War, King George VI decorated, in 1947, António Medeiros e Almeida with the Order of The British Empire.

In June 1951 Medeiros e Almeida was awarded the French Order of Commercial Merit - Mérite Commercial et Industriel - for his role with the Confederation of Flax and Hemp (Confédération Internationale du Lin et du Chanvre).

António de Medeiros e Almeida died in February 1986, at age 90.

Portuguese Honours

• ComC - Commander of the Military Order of Christ (1941)

• OB - Officer of the Order of Merit (1941)

• ComB - Commander of the Order of Merit (1959)

• GOMAI - Grand Officer of the Order of Entrepreneurial Merit (1962)

• GCMAI - Grand Official of the Order of Entrepreneurial Merit (1969)

International Honours

• OBE - Honorary Officer of the Civil Division of the Most Excellent Order of the British Empire (1947)

• OMC - Ordre du Mérite Commercial et Industriel, France (1951)

== House-Museum ==
In 1943, António Medeiros e Almeida purchased a small mansion facing rua Rosa Araújo and rua Mouzinho da Silveira, where he planned to set up his home. He hired the architect Carlos Ramos to carry out the necessary renovations. He lived in this new house until 1971, at which point he decided to transform his home into a museum. The couple then moved to an adjoining house, designed by the architect Ventura Terra, which Almeida had acquired.

Seeking to decorate his home, Medeiros e Almeida purchased artworks from Portuguese and foreign antique dealers as well as national and international auction houses becoming, over time, a passionate collector of decorative arts: "Since my twenties, that is, since 1915, I became interested in antiques, which I started to acquire when I was 30 years old and when my possessions allowed (…)"

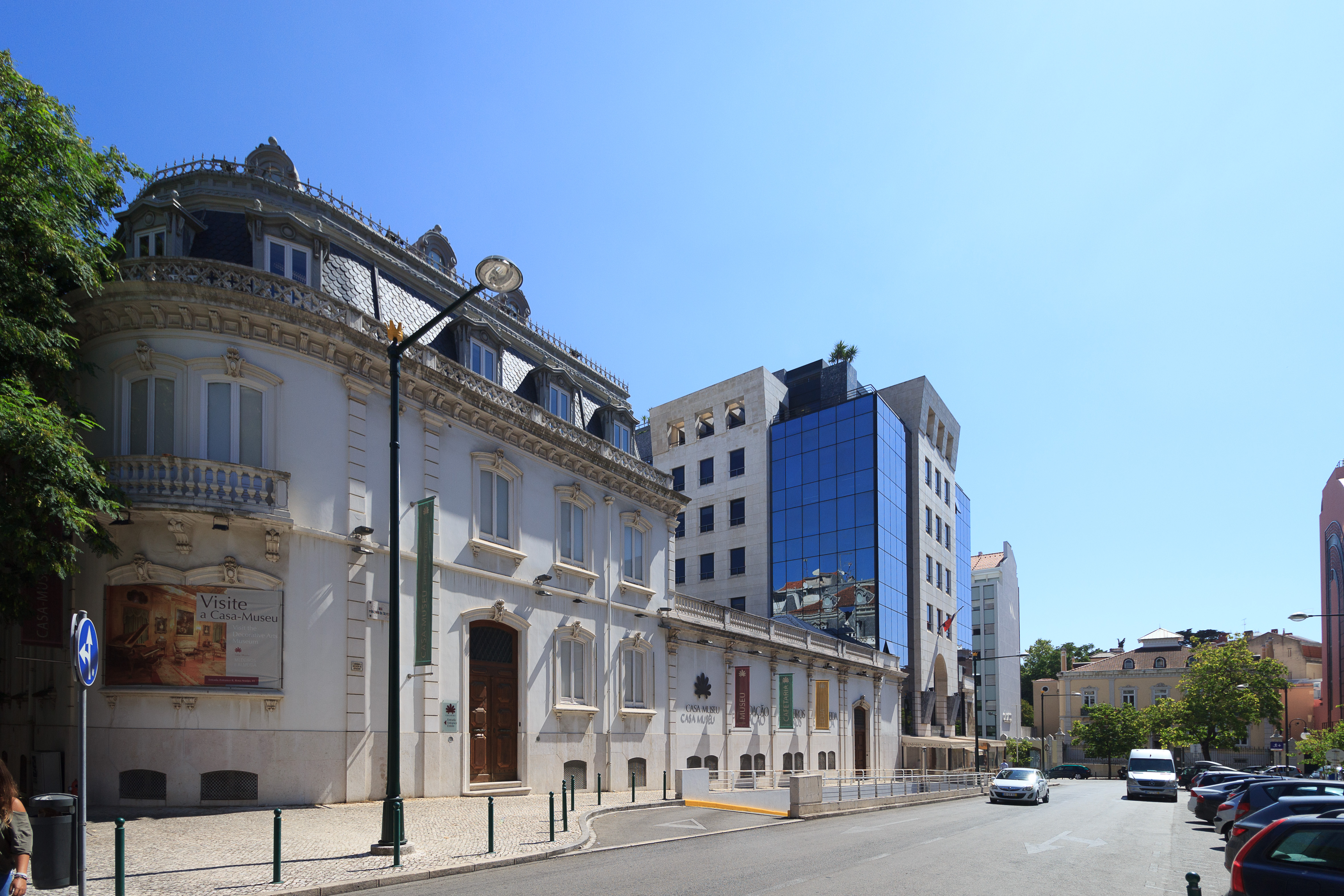
António Medeiros e Almeida House Museum

Having had no children, and aware that his art collection had reached a level of significant importance, from the mid-60s onward, the Medeiros e Almeida couple entertained the idea of creating a museum to guarantee the preservation of his collection. To this end, he decided to make his collection and home available to the public. In 1968 Medeiros e Almeida commissioning the architect Alberto Cruz to expand his house over the garden and adapt the building so that it could become a museum.

The resulting museum displays a total of 27 rooms set out across two distinct areas: the “old wing” that was inhabited by the couple and left exactly as it was and the “new wing” containing themed rooms in which grand European interiors have been recreated.

The work of the house museum was to be completed in 1973 by the architects Frederico George (1915-1994) and José Sommer Ribeiro (1924-2006), the latter also taking charge of the museography project. When Medeiros e Almeida died in 1986, the installation of the Casa-Museum was completed.

To guarantee the accomplishment of his will, Medeiros e Almeida created a foundation. The bylaws were published in August 1972 and legalized in a public deed on 21 February 1973. The Foundation gives its name and donates all its movable and immovable assets.

Pragmatic and aware that, in the absence of financial means, its intentions could be compromised in the future, Medeiros e Almeida left in his will the guidelines for the Medeiros e Almeida Foundation to survive with its funds. To this end, he arranged for all companies to be sold and a rental property to be built on land adjacent to his house (drawer on rua Mouzinho da Silveira and rua Barata Salgueiro), previously acquired. The building was completed in 1992, and its lease constitutes the means of financing for the institution's operations.

The Casa-Museum opened to the public on 1 June 2001.
