= Riba de Ave =

- Civil parish
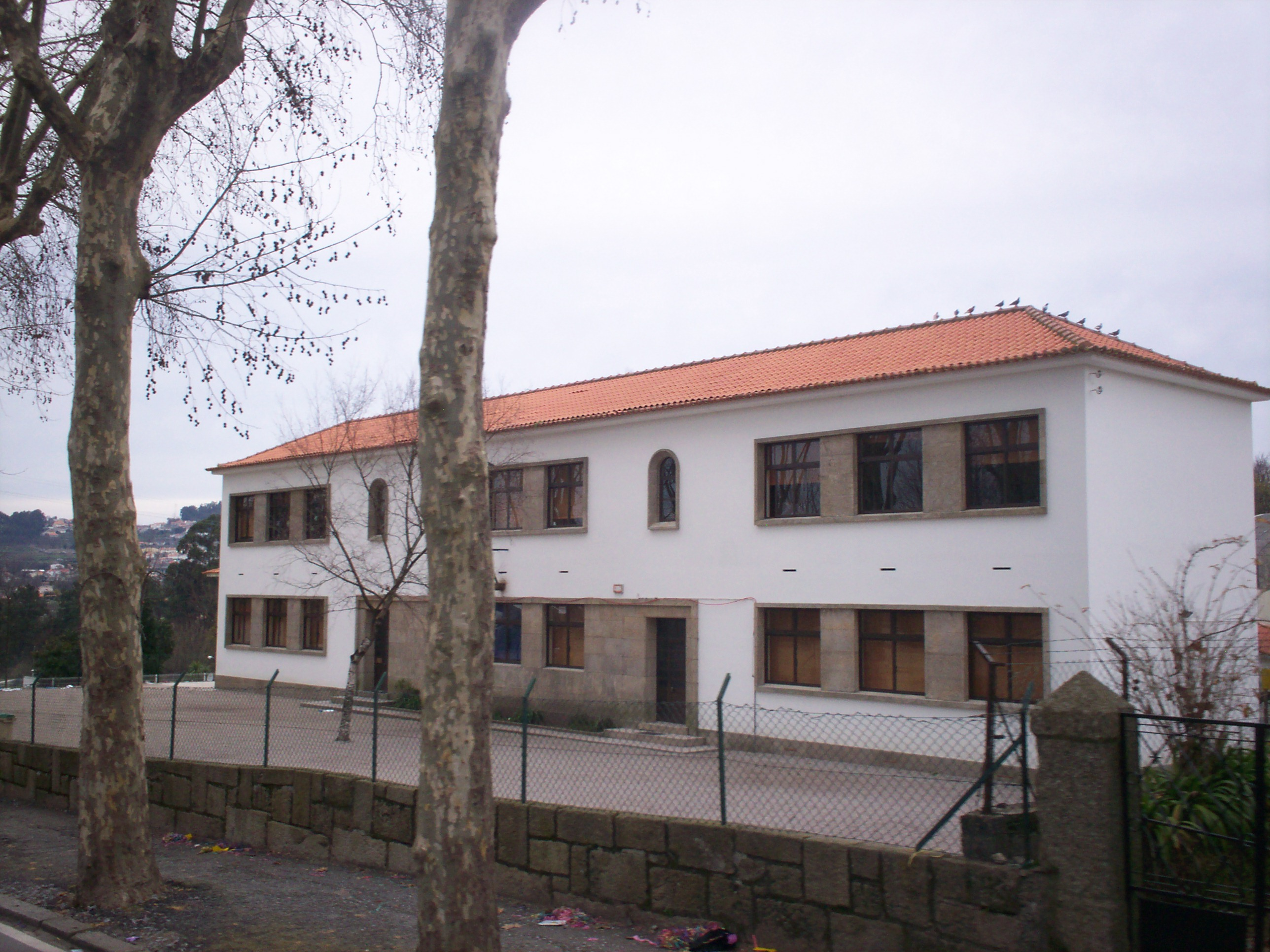

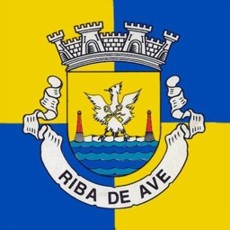
- Coat of arms

- Location in Portugal
- Coordinates: 41.394°N 8.394°W
- Country: Portugal
- Region: Norte
- Intermunic. comm.: Ave
- District: Braga
- Municipality: Vila Nova de Famalicão

Area
  - Total: 2.76 km^{2} (1.07 sq mi)

Population (2011)
  - Total: 3,425
  - Density: 1,240/km^{2} (3,210/sq mi)
- Time zone: UTC+00:00 (WET)
  - Summer (DST): UTC+01:00 (WEST)

Riba de Ave (also known as Riba d'Ave) is a Portuguese town located in the municipality of Vila Nova de Famalicão. The population in 2011 was 3,425, in an area of 2.76 km².

The town has existed since before Portugal became a country, although it has never been more than a tiny village in the Ave Valley. It's the only place in the region that has maintained its name since medieval times.

The town only started to develop at the end of the 19th century when a textile industrial, Narciso Ferreira, settled there and created one of the first textile factories of the Ave Valley, Sampaio Ferreira. He was very successful and Riba de Ave was, for the better part of the 20th century one of the richest villages of the region. However the successive economic crisis proved fatal for most of the town's industry.
