= François Linke =

French cabinet maker (1855–1946)

François Linke at his desk, 32 Quai Henri, Paris, circa 1926

François Linke (1855–1946) was a leading Parisian ébéniste of the late 19th and early 20th centuries.

== Early life ==
Linke was born on 17 June 1855 in the small Bohemian village of Deutsch Pankraz, now known as Jítrava in the Czech Republic. Records show that Linke served an apprenticeship with a master cabinetmaker, named Neumann, which he completed in 1877. Linke’s work book or Arbeits-Buch records that he was in Vienna from July 1872 to October 1873 at the time of the International Exhibition held there in 1873.

== Career ==
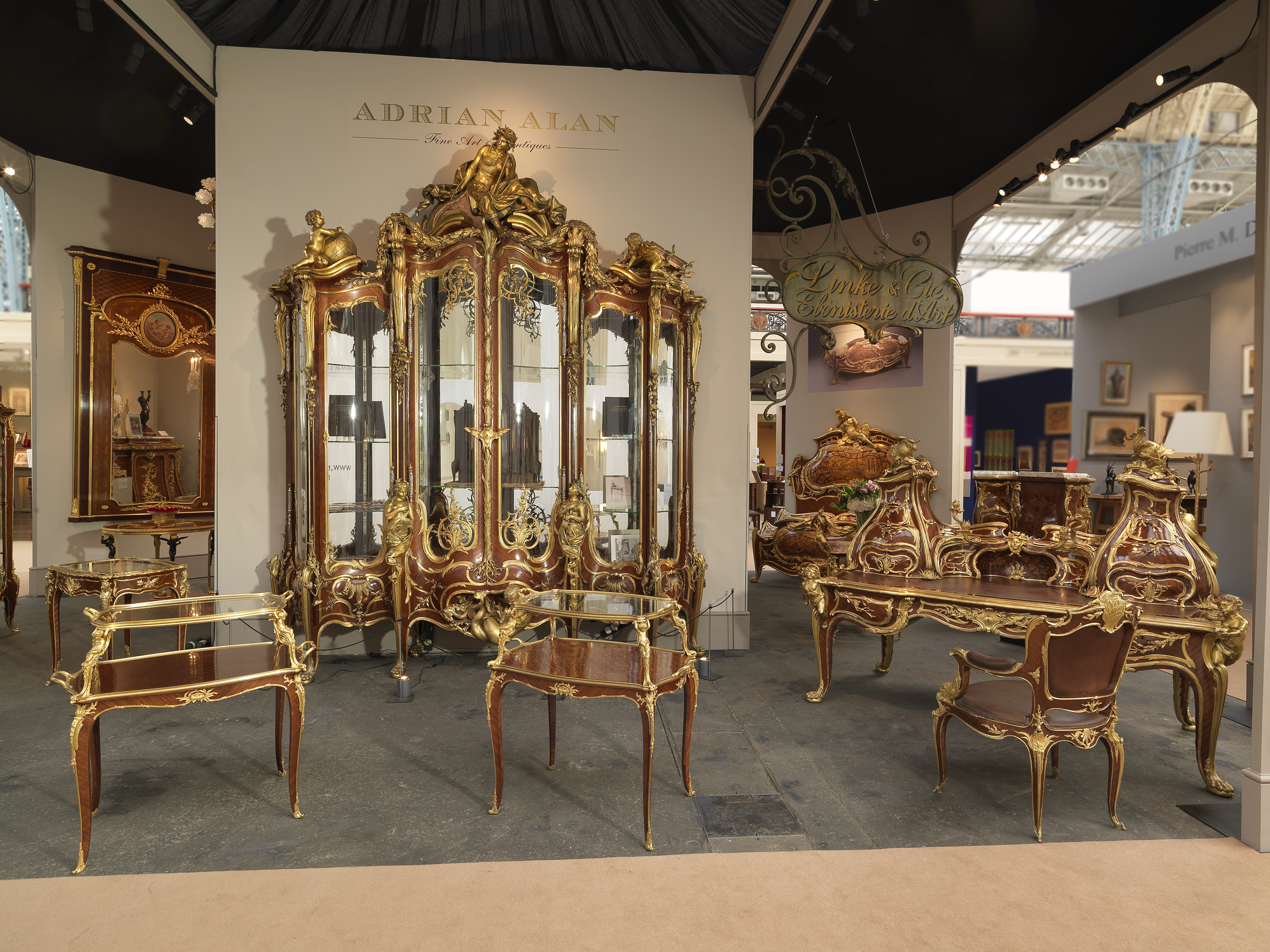
Grande Bibliothèque by Linke

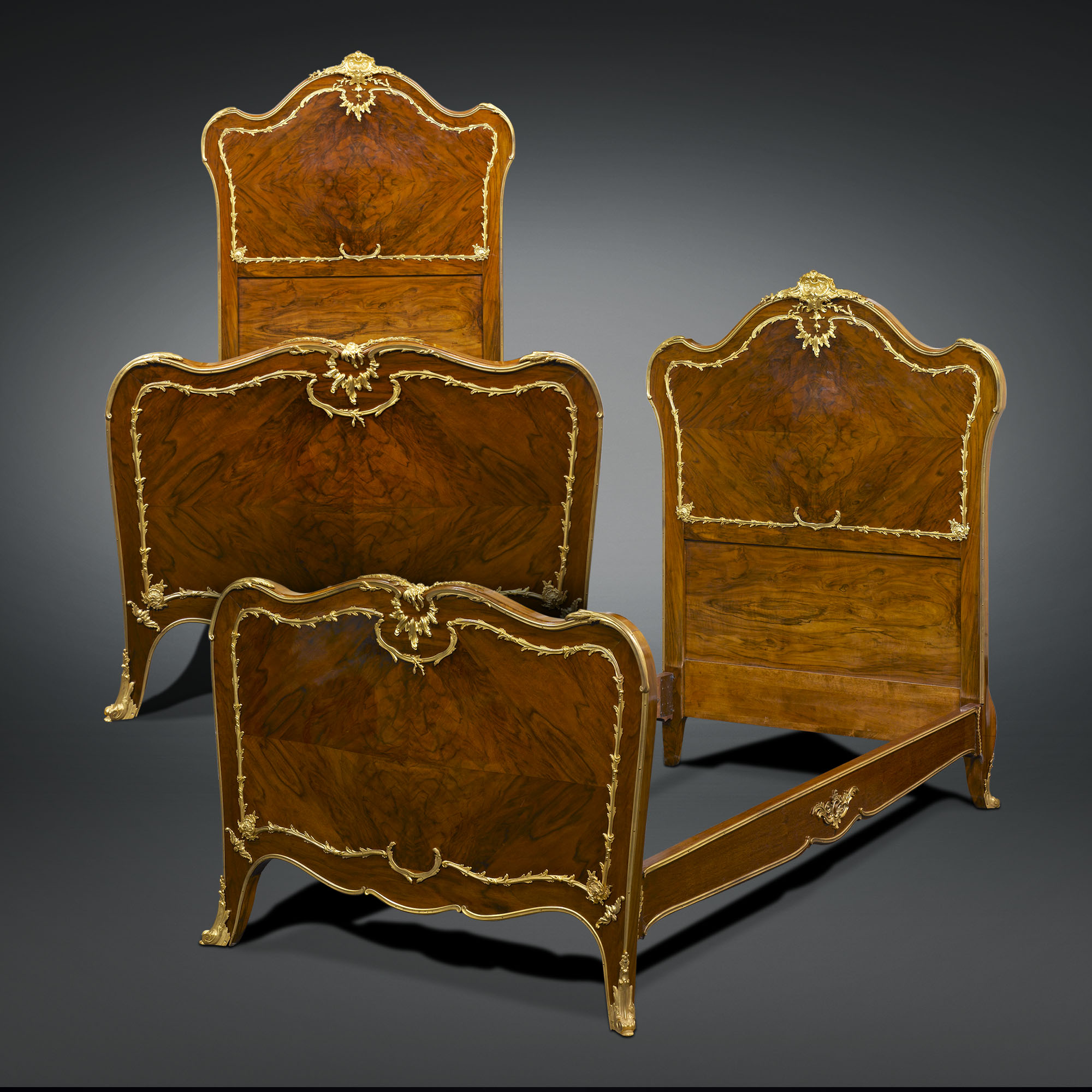
Rococo-style twin beds by Linke

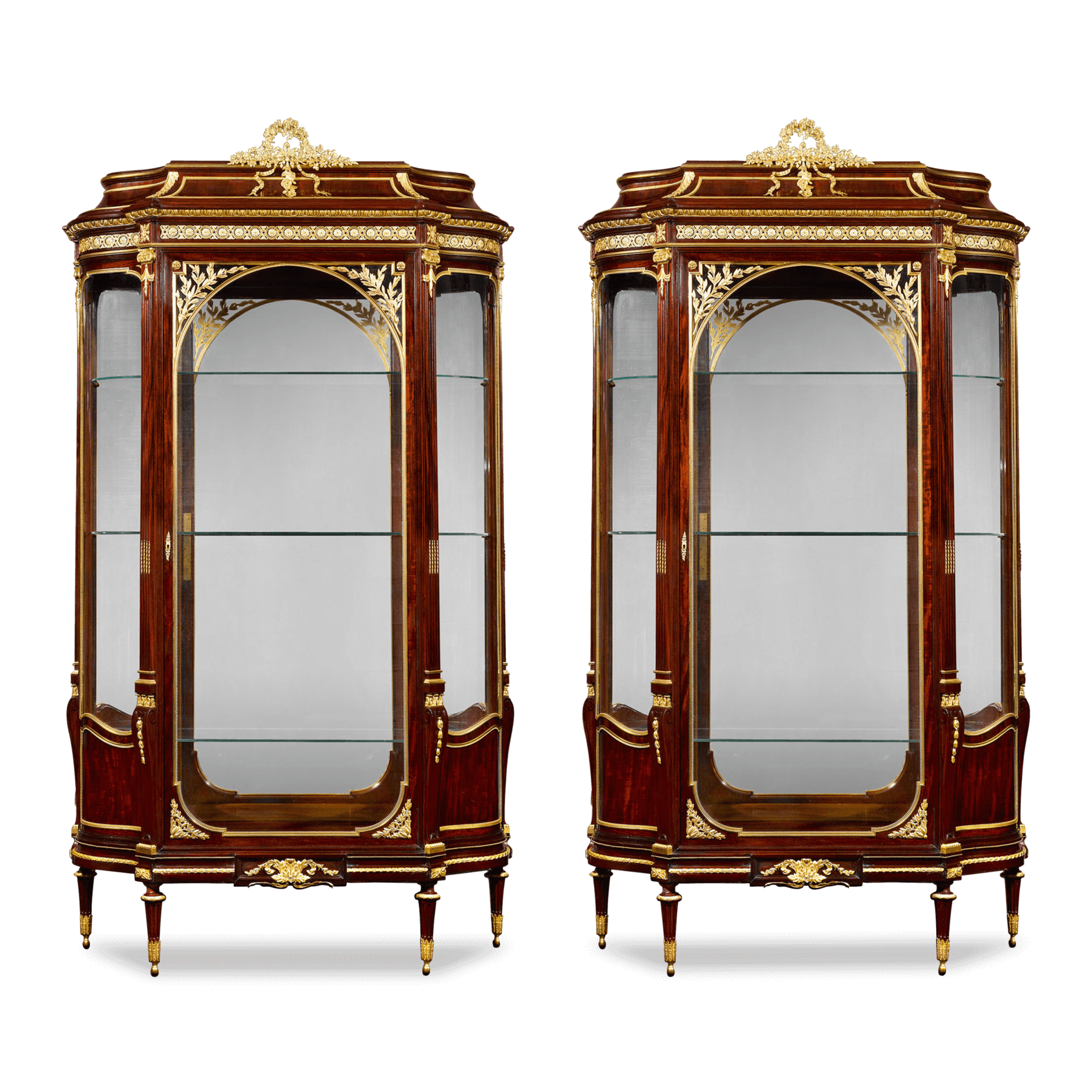
Rococo vitrines by Linke, circa 1880

Linke subsequently travelled to Prague, Budapest and Weimar before finally arriving in Paris in 1875. It is documented that he obtained employment with an unknown German cabinetmaker in Paris, and stylistic similarities, photographs and geographical proximity have led some to suggest that Emmanuel Zwiener was the most likely candidate. After a period back in his home town, he returned once and for all to Paris in 1877.

In 1878, Paris hosted the third great International Exhibition, a remarkable success for a country ravaged by war only seven years earlier. It is known that the fledgling Linke workshops were active in the Faubourg St. Antoine as early as 1881; during this time, he supplied furniture for other more established makers such as Jansen and Krieger.

By 1889, another World’s Fair took place in Paris. Gustave Eiffel erected what has become the most iconic building in Paris for the exhibition, and the atmosphere of wealth and confidence may well have encouraged Linke to think that he could contribute an important part to the next great exhibition. As early as 1892, this was decreed to take place at the end of the century, in an attempt to pre-empt Berlin from staging the last great show of the century.

In 1892, Victor Champier, one of the commissioners for the 1900 Paris Fair, had appealed, "Create in the manner of the masters, do not copy what they have made". It was an appeal against mere reproduction, and Linke rose to this challenge in an unparalleled way with his unique display that was to include the Grand Bureau.

Determined to outshine the competition at the Exhibition, Linke had set about creating the most ambitious pieces he could envisage, and more extravagant than had ever been displayed before. The items he exhibited marked a transition from the historicist interpretation of Louis XV and Louis XVI styles, an interpretation that was the mainstay of his nearest rivals, to something startlingly new and vital in its immediacy.

Together with Léon Messagé, Linke developed a new style for the 1900 Exhibition that paid homage to the Louis XV Rococo in the fluidity of its approach, but an approach fused with the lively flowing lines of the contemporary and progressive Art Nouveau. The Art Journal reported in 1900 on Linke's stand:

The work of M. Linke ... was an example of what can be done by seeking inspiration amongst the classic examples of Louis XV and XVI without in any great sense copying these great works. M. Linke's work was original in the true sense of the word, and as such commended itself to the intelligent seeker after the really artistic things of the Exhibition. Wonderful talent was employed in producing the magnificent pieces of furniture displayed.

Linke's stand would have appeared refreshingly new to contemporary onlookers, the traditional designs of the eighteenth century melting seamlessly into an exuberant naturalism. The Revue described Linke's style as "entièrement nouveaux" and noted "This opinion is universally accepted. Linke's stand is the biggest show in the history of art furniture in the year 1900."

Linke produced furniture for the 1900 exhibition without any commission or any potential buyer in mind. At a time when other more established furniture businesses such as those of Beurdeley and Dasson were closing down, he made a large investment in his stand and the furniture he supplied for it.

Linke’s notebook records visitors to his stand from England, Europe, the Americas, Egypt and Japan, including: the King of Sweden, three visits from the King of Belgium, Prince Radziwill, the Prince d’Arenberg, the Comte Alberic du Chastel, Miss Anna May Gould, the American heiress, distinguished furniture makers and the President of France, Emile Loubet.

The technical brilliance of his work and the artistic change that it represented was never to be repeated. His showrooms expanded into prestigious premises in Paris in the Place Vendôme, as well as the Faubourg St. Antoine, where his workshop had been established. He embarked on many important commissions in the years up to the outbreak of the First World War, making and designing furniture for leading international industrialists and bankers.

After the First World War, Linke undertook the extraordinary commission to furnish the Ras El Tin Palace in Alexandria for King Fuad of Egypt, possibly the largest single furniture commission ever conceived, eclipsing even Versailles. Linke flourished and remained active until the middle years of the 1930s and died in 1946.
