= Order of Entrepreneurial Merit =

Order of Entrepreneurial Merit Ordem do Mérito Empresarial
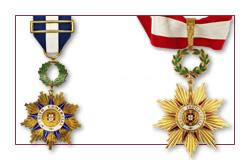
- Medal of Commercial Merit and badge of Industrial Merit

Awarded by Portuguese Republic
- Type: Order
- Established: 1893
- Awarded for: High services rendered to commerce, industry and agriculture.
- Status: Currently constituted
- Grand Master: President of the Portuguese Republic
- Chancellor: Graça Freitas
- Grades: Grand Cross; Grand Officer; Commander; Officer; Medal

Precedence
- Next (higher): Order of Public Instruction

The Order of Entrepreneurial Merit (Portuguese: Ordem do Mérito Empresarial) is the most junior of the Portuguese civil orders of merit, and is intended to distinguish those who have rendered, as an entrepreneur or worker, outstanding service in promoting appreciation or services in an economic sector. The Order has three categories: Agricultural, Commercial and Industrial; each of these correspond to specific related to the associated economic sectors, which is also reflected in the insignia of each category.

== History ==
Originally established on 4 June 1893 by Charles I during his visit to the city of Beja as the "Civil Order of Agricultural and Industrial Merit", the order was abolished with the founding of the Portuguese republic and reformulated in 1926. In 1991, it was renamed the "Order of Agricultural, Industrial and Commercial Merit" following the addition of a third class to recognise services rendered in connection with the trade and service sectors. Following legislation in 2011, the order received its present name, maintaining the three existing classes but extending the granting of the Commercial Class of Merit to the important tourism sector. Moreover, it is specifically provided for by the statutes of the order that it may be granted for the merit of workers in their respective sectors of activity.

== Divisions and grades ==
The order is awarded in three categories, each in five classes:

=== Category of Agricultural Merit (Classe do Mérito Agrícola) ===
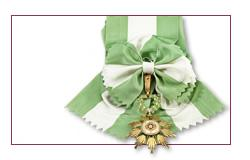
Sash and badge of Agricultural Merit

Intended to distinguish those who have rendered, as an entrepreneur or worker, outstanding service in the promotion or enhancement of agriculture and the livestock, fish and forest resources of the country.

- Grand Cross (GCMA) (Grã-Cruz)
- Grand Officer (GOMA) (Grande-Oficial)
- Commander (ComMA) (Comendador)
- Officer (OMA) (Oficial)
- Medal (MedMA) (Medalha)
- Honorary Member (MHMA) (Membro Honorário)

=== Category of Commercial Merit (Classe do Mérito Comercial) ===
Intended to distinguish those who have rendered, as an entrepreneur or worker, outstanding service in the promotion or enhancement of commerce, tourism and related services.

- Grand Cross (GCMC) (Grã-Cruz)
- Grand Officer (GOMC) (Grande-Oficial)
- Commander (ComMC) (Comendador)
- Officer (OMC) (Oficial)
- Medal (MedMC) (Medalha)
- Honorary Member (MHMC) (Membro Honorário)

=== Category of Industrial Merit (Classe do Mérito Industrial) ===
Intended to distinguish those who have rendered, as an entrepreneur or worker, outstanding service in the promotion or enhancement of industry.

- Grand Cross (GCMI) (Grã-Cruz)
- Grand Officer (GOMI) (Grande-Oficial)
- Commander (ComMI) (Comendador)
- Officer (OMI) (Oficial)
- Medal (MedMI) (Medalha)
- Honorary Member (MHMI) (Membro Honorário)

== Insignia ==
The star for all three categories is a nine-pointed enamel star, in green for the category of Agricultural Merit, in blue for the category of Commercial Merit and in red for the category of Industrial Merit. In the center of the star is the national coat of arms in gold, which is surrounded by a white enamel border with either "Agricultural," "Commercial" or "Industrial" Merit inscribed on it in capital gold-enamelled letters. The star is itself centered on a nine-pointed plaque, in gold for the degrees of Grand Cross and Grand Officer and in silver for the degree of Commander. Between each arm of the star is a five-pointed enamel star of the same colour as the star for the respective category of the order.

The badge for all three categories is a miniature version of the star without the five-pointed stars between its arms. It is worn suspended from two crossed green enamel palms, at the end of a sash for the degree of Grand Cross, from a necklet for the degrees of Grand Officer and Commander, and from a ribbon on the left chest for the degrees of Officer and Medal.

The ribbon for all three categories is of moire silk; it is green and white for the Agricultural category, blue and white for the commercial category and red and white for the Industrial category.

== Method of wear ==
- Grand Cross: wears the badge from a sash worn right to left across the chest, and the star of the order in gold on the left chest.
- Grand Officer: wears the badge from a necklet or from a bow for ladies, and the star of the order in gold on the left chest.
- Commander: wears the badge from a necklet or from a bow for ladies, and the star of the order in silver on the left chest.
- Officer: wears the badge from a ribbon with rosette on the left chest or from a bow with rosette on the left chest for ladies.
- Medal: wears the badge from a ribbon on the left chest, or from a bow on the left chest for ladies.

== See also ==
- List of recipients of the Grand Cross of the Order of Entrepreneurial Merit
