= Ana Cardoso (actor) =

19th-century Portuguese stage actor

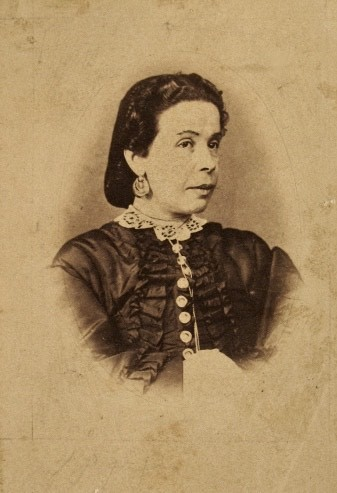
- Born: Ana Cardoso; 1830; Lamego, Portugal
- Died: 12 October 1878 Aged 48 (Approx.); Lisbon, Portugal
- Resting place: Prazeres Cemetery, Lisbon
- Occupation: Actress
- Years active: 1857-1878
- Known for: Portuguese theatre

Ana Cardoso was a 19th-century Portuguese actress.

== Early life ==
Little is known about the early life of Ana Cardoso, other than that she was born in the town of Lamego in the Viseu District of Portugal in around 1830. No records of birth or marriage have been found and the death certificate provides no information.

== Career ==
Arriving in Lisbon, Cardoso became a disciple of Émile Doux. He was French and had arrived in Portugal at the end of the Portuguese Civil War in 1835 with a French theatre company and stayed after the company returned to France, taking charge of a new Portuguese theatre company. She debuted at the Teatro D. Fernando in 1850, in the comic opera A Batalha de Montereau (The Battle of Montereau). She then moved to the Teatro do Ginásio, where she spent more than twenty years, performing dramas, comedies and farces. Over time she overcame the disadvantage she suffered at the beginning of her career. While actresses were generally expected to be beautiful, Cardoso was not. However, the power of her performances eventually won over the audiences. One of her best-known performances was Fidalguinho (which on 22 December 1870 was her benefit show at the Ginásio). She went on to perform this play at the Crystal Palace theatre in Porto and at Teatro São Pedro in Rio de Janeiro. While mainly working at the Ginásio she also performed at the Teatro da Rua dos Condes in Lisbon at the end of 1854 and in early 1855.

Cardoso stayed four years working in Brazil, and then returned to Portugal to join the D. Maria II National Theatre. There she performed with other great female names of the Portuguese theatre of the time, such as Delphina, Emília Adelaide, Emília Cândida, Emília das Neves, and Emília Letroublon. Her last play was called Oração dos naufragos (Prayer of the Shipwrecks), which was performed in 1877. She died on 12 October 1878. She was buried in the Deposit held by the Dramatic Artists Society in Lisbon's Prazeres Cemetery.
