= Gertrudes Rita da Silva =

Portuguese stage actor

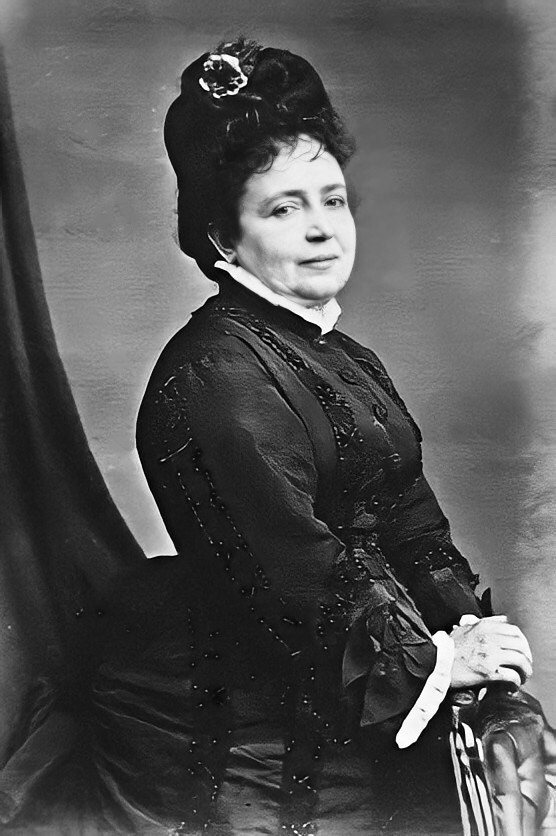
- Photo of Gertrudes Rita da Silva in 1875
- Born: Gertrudes Rita de Azevedo; 31 January 1825; Lisbon, Portugal
- Died: 4 July 1888 (Aged 63); Lisbon, Portugal
- Resting place: Prazeres Cemetery, Lisbon
- Other name: Gertrudes
- Occupation: Actress
- Known for: Performing comedies
- Spouse: António Lourenço da Silva
- Children: One daughter and one son

Gertrudes Rita da Silva (1825 – 1888), often known just as Gertrudes, was a 19th-century Portuguese actress, who was particularly known for her comic performances.

== Early life ==
Gertrudes Rita de Azevedo was born on 31 January 1825, in the parish of São Paulo in the Portuguese capital of Lisbon. She was the daughter of Herculano José de Azevedo and Joaquina Rosa, who both died when Gertrudes was very young. In 1841, at the age of 16, she married António Lourenço da Silva. They had a daughter, Lucinda Júlia da Silva, who also became an actress.

== Acting career ==
Silva made her professional debut at the D. Maria II National Theatre on April 21, 1850 in the 3-act comedy Two Weddings of Convenience by Luís Augusto Palmeirim. It was also Palmeirim's debut as a playwright and the play and Silva's performance were well received by the public and by critics. Most of her performances were at the D. Maria II, where she acted in both Portuguese and foreign plays, the latter including work by Molière, Alexandre Dumas and Alexandre Dumas fils. In 1853 she joined a new company at the D. Maria II, performing with such stars as Emília das Neves, Delphina and Carlota Talassi. In 1860, she performed in the stage debut of her daughter, who was just 16.

Silva went on tour to Brazil in 1880-81. On her return she joined the company formed by the actress Emília Adelaide to perform at the Teatro do Ginásio. At the height of her career, she achieved fame performing in comedy roles, but towards the end of her career she moved away from comedy to drama, giving several notable performances in 1874 and 1875, including the play, Cláudia, in which she performed with Adelaide and Emília Cândida. Her last official performance was on 2 November 1876 in a play by George Sand.

== Death ==
Gertrudes Silva died on 4 July 1888. Already widowed, few knew that she was seriously ill, but her daughter, who had lived in Brazil for some time, heard about the severity of her mother's condition and went to Lisbon to look after her. She was buried in the Prazeres Cemetery, in the private area, belonging to the Montepio Mutual Aid Association of Portuguese Actors. In an obituary published in O Occidente, Gervásio Lobato wrote that she "left brilliant evidence of her great and remarkable talent."
