= Emília Letroublon =

French stage actor who lived and performed in Lisbon, Portugal

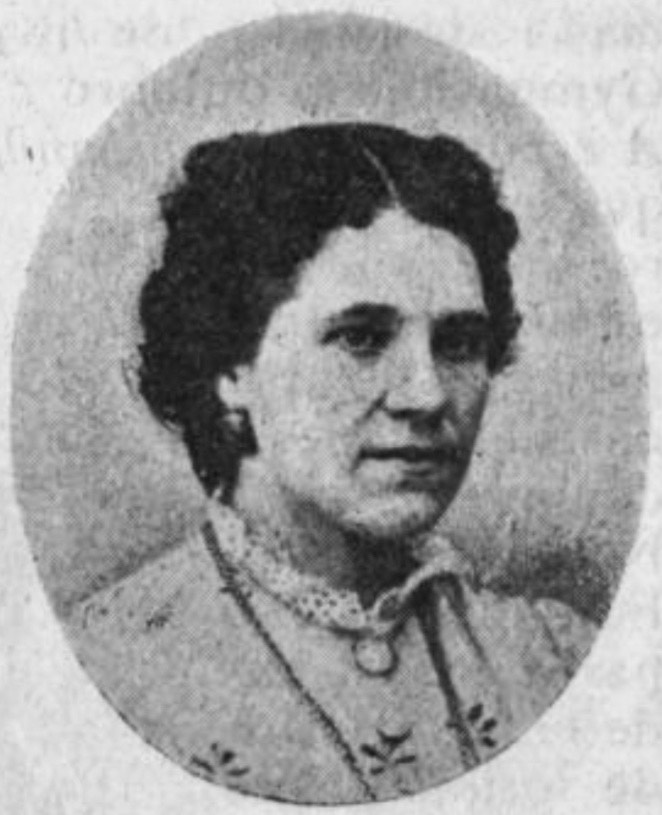
- Born: Emília Genoveva Letroublon; 1829 (approx.); Ribérac, France
- Died: 5 July 1895; Lisbon, Portugal
- Occupation: actor
- Years active: 20
- Known for: Portuguese theatre
- Partner: José Carlos dos Santos

Emília Letroublon (c. 1829 – 1895) was an actress of French birth who made her career in Portugal in the 19th century.

== Early life ==
Emília Genoveva Letroublon was born in Ribérac in the Dordogne department of France around 1829. Her mother moved to the Portuguese capital of Lisbon and ran an inn at Cais do Sodré on the banks of the Tagus river. Letroublon debuted as an actor in the early days of operation of the Teatro do Ginásio, in 1848. She was so successful that her salary was increased by 400% in the second month of her contract, and the public's appreciation continued for her future roles. After the modernization of the Ginásio in 1852, she again became part of its company, together with Emília Cândida. In one play she smoked on the stage. This was considered a scandal and attracted many people to the theatre to see it.

== Career and lifestyle ==
Letroublon was considered to be very beautiful, elegant and fashionable. Together with Emília Cândida and Emília das Neves she was considered the "third beautiful Emília". Living what may be considered a Bohemian or unconventional lifestyle, she rode horses dressed in male attire, again something that was considered a scandal. She played the guitar and sang the Portuguese music, fado, well. On the evening of 26 March 1856, when she was due to go onto the stage, she was kidnapped by José de Brito. There are suggestions that she was abducted again later, by Augusto José da Cunha, who would go on to become a government minister. From 1858 she lived with the actor José Carlos dos Santos and started to devote herself entirely to acting, leaving behind the unconventional life.

Letroublon joined the D. Maria II National Theatre in July 1861, playing opposite her partner, Santos. On November 30, 1867, at the opening of the Teatro da Trindade, she was part of the artistic company with Emília Adelaide and Delphina. She then had significant success in La Famille Benoîton, a comedy by Victorien Sardou. In 1868 she followed Santos to the Teatro do Príncipe Real where she played the role of La Grande-Duchesse de Gérolstein by Jacques Offenbach. This play was such a success that it was repeated at the Teatro da Rua dos Condes with a different cast. It turned out to be her last show. She became very ill and almost totally incapacitated. Santos, who was himself getting increasingly blind, organised accommodation for her to live with a maid. He was to die in 1886, after which she was looked after by close friends. She had a small pension that the State provided for artists.

== Death ==
Letroublon died on 5 July 1895 in Lisbon, a victim of edema. After 27 years away from the stage she was little remembered by the public. Some actors attended her funeral, including Emília Cândida and Beatriz Rente, but no theatres were represented. She was buried at the Prazeres Cemetery.
