= Teatro D. Fernando =

Former theatre in Lisbon, Portugal

- Interior view of the theatre
- Address: Santa Justa; Lisbon; Portugal
- Owner: Francisco Rodrigues Batalha
- Capacity: 636

Construction
- Opened: 29 October 1849
- Closed: 1860
- Architect: Arnould Bertin

The Teatro D. Fernando was a theatre in the Portuguese capital of Lisbon between 1849 and 1860.

== Background ==
Following the dissolution of the monasteries in Portugal after the Liberal Wars (1828-1834), steps were taken to re-use the churches, convents and monasteries that were vacated, given the limited resources to construct new buildings from scratch. The building that became the Teatro D. Fernando was the Church of Santa Justa, situated in the Santa Justa area of Lisbon, close to where the Santa Justa Lift is now, in what is known as the Baixa Pombalina, an area redeveloped after the 1755 Lisbon earthquake. The church was initially used as a barracks of the 7th Battalion of the Lisbon National Guard, although by August 1838 it was unoccupied again. At that time, Émile Doux (1798–1876), the French actor, director, playwright and impresario who worked in Portugal and was the director of another Lisbon theatre, the Teatro da Rua dos Condes, sent an application to Queen D. Maria II, together with the rich businessman, the Count of Farrobo, requesting permission to turn the building into a theatre. The application was rejected and it was only a decade later that another businessman, Francisco Rodrigues Batalha, was successful with a similar application. Émile Doux was also involved with his application.

== Design ==
The architect was Arnould Bertin from France. Given the narrowness of the plot, it was a complicated architectural exercise. After conversion, the theatre had an elliptical shape, with boxes on four levels, consisting of 54 for the general public, 3 for the royal family (for which fees were paid), and 2 belonging to the owners. Up to 324 people could be accommodated in these boxes and there was also room for 312 in the stalls (orchestra) and galleries. The design and decoration were commented on very favourably by the Lisbon newspapers, having been done by the most prominent craftsmen in Lisbon at the time. The intention was to attract the upper middle classes, who seemed dissatisfied with other Lisbon theatres.

== Competition with other theatres ==
When the D. Fernando opened on 29 October 1849, the King's birthday, Lisbon already had two privately owned theatres operating regularly, the Teatro do Salitre and the Teatro do Ginásio. Subsequently, the Teatro da Rua dos Condes re-opened, having been closed between 1846 and 1852. There were also two leading theatres financed by the government, the Teatro São Carlos, mainly devoted to opera and the D. Maria II National Theatre, which aimed to present plays of the highest quality. The D. Fernando effectively positioned itself in competition with the D. Maria II National Theatre, at least initially, in part because theatregoers seemed dissatisfied with the D. Maria II. Later it would also present comedy, vaudeville, comic opera, dance, orchestral concerts, magic shows and even circus performances. Part of the tactics to compete with the D. Maria II was to persuade the King Consort, D. Fernando II, to agree to the theatre being named after him. At one time it was even hoped that the theatre could become a "Royal" or a "National" theatre.

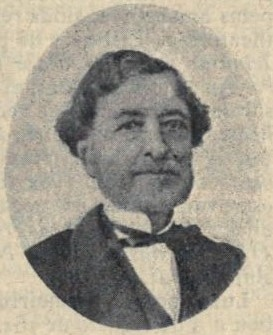
Emílio Doux

== Early performances ==
The inaugural performance was Adrienne Lecouvreur, a play by Ernest Legouvé and Eugène Scribe, which had been first performed in Paris a few months earlier. It starred Emília das Neves, Portugal’s leading actress of the time, as Adrienne and was directed by Émile Doux. During the break between the third and fourth acts of the first show the leading Portuguese playwright Almeida Garrett went on to the stage to tell Neves that "you can’t act better". As an indication of the professional rivalry of the time, the contract Neves agreed with the theatre company specified that she would not have to perform in the same play as the actress Carlota Talassi, should the latter be recruited by the company. In the first season, Neves also performed in nine other plays. It was common for two plays to be performed on the same evening and a play's run rarely lasted more than a fortnight. This inevitably led to overwork by Neves, something that began to be noticed by the theatre reviewers in the Lisbon press. This caused a decline in the audiences, forcing the company to reduce its prices.

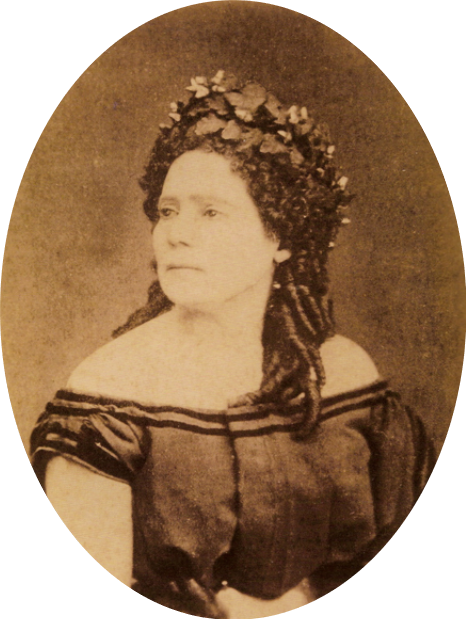
Emília das Neves

Unable to cover his costs, Doux decided to close the theatre at the beginning of June 1850. As a result of this decision, the actors formed an Artistic Society, in order to be able to continue to work, while continuing to collaborate with Doux. Emília das Neves did not join the Society and left the D. Fernando. The new Society concentrated on comic opera and was immediately successful, confirming the views of critics that the repertoire presented by Doux had lacked variety. However, the Society still had trouble in covering its costs and one of the founding partners decided to withdraw.

== Arrival of French and Spanish theatre companies ==
To address its financial difficulties the Society went on a tour of the provinces and invited a French company to use the theatre from March 1851. From mid-July to September 1851 a Spanish troupe performed a repertoire of Spanish plays. However, after an event at the theatre involving aggressive behaviour to the audience by one of the actors, the public began to boycott the Spanish company. In March 1852 another French company, owned by Jules Bernard, took up residence in the D. Fernando, performing vaudevilles. On 27 May, a benefit show was held for the performers, with great success, indicative of the company's popularity in Lisbon. Following that, the theatre was closed for a time to allow its capacity to be increased. The Jules Bernard company returned in February 1853, this time without the same success, as the theatre reduced the performance days to four a week, leading Bernard to end the agreement. The theatre was then taken over by José Détry, a Frenchman who had been living in Lisbon for many years and had founded the city's gas lighting company in 1846. The theatre re-opened on 12 September 1853 with a French troupe. One reviewer was very enthusiastic because the company, which mainly performed vaudevilles, had a "lot of mademoiselles". However, the company experienced difficulties, with several of the cast members deciding to leave, resulting in the management of the theatre having to request new performers from Paris and the theatre being closed until they arrived. With relatively little success during 1854 and the beginning of 1855, the French company left Lisbon in June 1855.

== Comic operas ==
From 21 July 1855, the theatre was occupied by a group of actors brought together by the businessman António Pedro Barreto de Saldanha. They mainly performed comic operas that had already been performed in other Lisbon theatres. December 1855 brought the first play, a comedy, by the noted Portuguese playwright José Maria Brás Martins to be performed at the D. Fernando, the beginning of a fruitful collaboration. 1856 brought the innovation, for Lisbon, of placing some of the actors among the audience, from where they would dialogue with each other and with those on the stage. In April 1856, the theatre was again let to an itinerant Spanish company, which stayed throughout May, alternating with the Portuguese company. From April 1857 it was let to another Spanish theatrical company, which had originally been planning to perform at the Teatro São Carlos.

== Closure due to yellow fever ==
In the last five months of 1857, parts of Lisbon were ravaged by yellow fever. At the time, the cause of transmission of the disease (mosquitos) was unknown and the theatre, in common with others, was closed because it was thought that people in close proximity could transmit the illness. The D. Fernando never really recovered from this, being largely inactive in 1858 until, late in the year, Ângelo Frondoni formed a company to perform Italian comic opera, known as Opera buffa. Little happened in 1859 although there were efforts to get a Spanish company to perform. The theatre's last performances were given by a Portuguese company and by a visiting company of Zouaves, French Light Infantry, from Crimea, in early 1860.

The Teatro D. Fernando closed down because of bankruptcy in 1860. It subsequently briefly became a crockery warehouse and also seems to have been, among other things, a tobacco factory and a hotel.

== See also ==
- List of theatres and auditoriums in Lisbon
