= Ana Pereira =

Portuguese actress and singer (1845-1921)

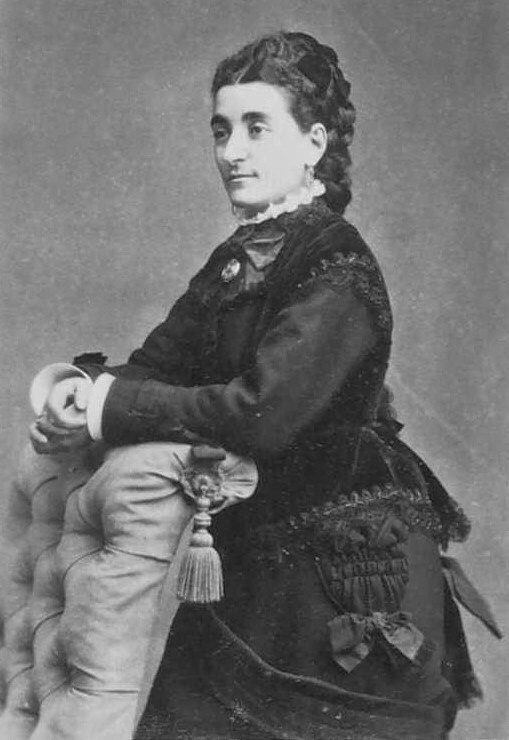
- Born: Ana Elisa Pereira; 27 July 1845; Alenquer, Portugal
- Died: 24 November 1921 (aged 76); Lisbon, Portugal
- Resting place: Alto de São João Cemetery, Lisbon
- Occupation(s): actress and singer
- Years active: 55
- Parent(s): Agostinho Lourenço de Jesus and Maria Isabel Pereira

Ana Elisa Pereira (1845 –1921) was a Portuguese stage and film actress and singer, mainly known for her work in theatres in Lisbon.

== Early life ==
Pereira was born in the parish of Cadafais, in the municipality of Alenquer, in the Lisbon District of Portugal on 27 July 1845. She was the daughter of Agostinho Lourenço de Jesus and Maria Isabel Pereira, both of whom came from Lisbon. She had one sister and one brother. At a young age her family left Alenquer for Lisbon to look for work after her father went blind. She started acting as a child with her sister, Margarida Clementina, at the Teatro do Ginásio, where her father had previously been employed. They were known amongst the other actors as the "blind man's daughters".

== Acting career ==
Pereira began her professional acting career at the Ginásio in 1861 in Pecados do Século XIX (Sins of the 19th Century) by José Maria Brás Martins, together with Emília das Neves. There she performed in several other plays, including The School for Wives by Molière. In 1862, the sisters were hired by Emília das Neves, for a company theatre director who put on shows in theatres in Porto. She then moved to the Teatro D. Luiz in Coimbra, which was later renamed as the Teatro Sousa Bastos. In 1864 she and her sister were hired for the inaugural performances at the Teatro do Príncipe Real in Lisbon, where she was very successful, later moving back to the Ginásio, where she achieved similar success. Her sister soon withdrew from acting after getting married. On 28 May 1868, she made her debut in a play by Victorien Sardou at the Teatro da Trindade, as the first operetta actress, where she had some of her greatest successes, working with the impresario and director, Francisco Palho.

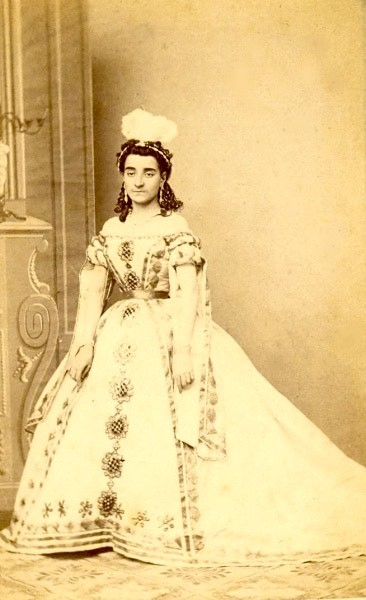
Pereira in the 1870s

However, disagreements with Palha led Pereira to move to the D. Maria II National Theatre in 1874 before returning to the Príncipe Real and touring for six years. In 1880 she returned to the Trindade, from where she was absent for some time after the failure of a play, The Sixth Part of the World, in which she fell on the stage while performing, which led to her attempted suicide by taking arsenic. She returned to the stage on 13 February 1890 at the Trindade, using crutches, to much applause and, reconciled with Palha, remained at that theatre until 1894. After a short period back at the D. Maria she moved to Teatro da Rua dos Condes and then the Teatro D. Amélia, now the Teatro São Luiz, before abandoning the stage for a few years. Pereira returned to the D. Maria in 1907 but left again in 1908, feeling that the work required of her was too much for her physical strength. In 1912 she received a benefit performance at the Trindade and retired on a state pension for actors.

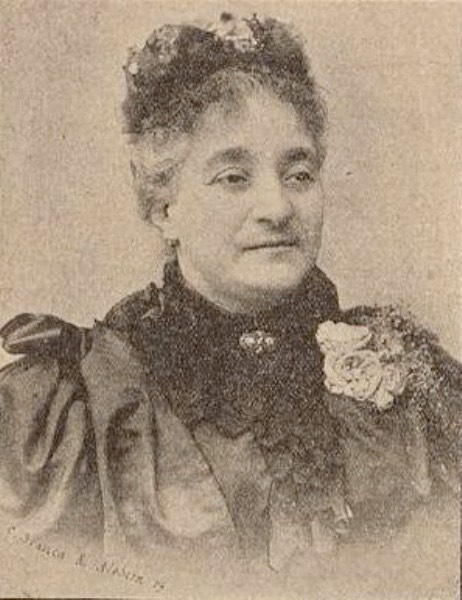
Pereira in 1905

In cinema, she participated in the silent film João José, together with Eduardo Brazão, which was shot and premiered in 1910. A decade later she was in O Condenado (The Convict), which was premiered in May 1921.

== Death ==
Pereira died on 24 November 1921, at her residence in Lisbon. She was buried in the Alto de São João Cemetery. A theatre in her home town of Alenquer was named after her in 1908.
