= Manuela Rey =

Spanish stage actress

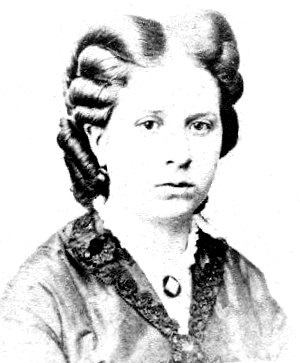
- Born: María Manuela Ramona Rey González; 1 October 1842; Mondoñedo, Galicia
- Died: 26 February 1866 Aged 23; Lisbon, Portugal
- Resting place: Prazeres Cemetery, Lisbon
- Other names: Manuela Rey Lopes
- Occupation: Actress
- Known for: Portuguese theatre

Manuela Rey (1842 – 1866) was a Galician theatre actress who found success on the Portuguese stage.

== Early life ==
María Manuela Ramona Rey González, known as Manuela Lopes Rey, was born in San Vicente de Trigás in Mondoñedo, in the province of Lugo in Galicia, Spain on 1 October 1842. She was one of eight or more children of Andrés Expósito and Francisca González, who married after her birth. She was placed for adoption to a family that was part of a travelling drama company that was staying at an inn where her mother worked. It appears that the surname of "Lopes" came from her adoptive mother.

== Acting career ==
At the age of six, Rey was already acting and, at eight, she was enthusiastically applauded for her performance in a play in León, Spain. At the age of nine, her adoptive father died and the company moved to Portugal, performing in Chaves, Bragança, Porto and elsewhere in the north of the country. The company dissolved in Viana do Castelo after failing to achieve success in Porto and a brother of her adoptive father formed a new company, which in 1856 moved to Lisbon and performed at the Teatro do Salitre, where her first performance was as a boy.

After a tour of the area south of Lisbon, including Setúbal, Rey returned to Lisbon and auditioned at both the Teatro Nacional de São Carlos and the D. Maria II National Theatre, where the jury included the writer António Feliciano de Castilho. Having received grammar and Portuguese lessons, in November 1857 she began working at the theatre, alongside Carlota Talassi and Emília Adelaide. Playing the role of the ingénue, she achieved many triumphs in a short period and by 1859 she was included in a list of biographies of prominent actors in Portugal and Brazil. By 1864 she was leaving the role of ingénue behind and beginning to play more substantial roles. She also wrote some plays, although these were not published. It was rumoured that King Pedro V fell in love with her, before marrying Princess Stephanie of Hohenzollern-Sigmaringen. In October 1865, a playwright and a journalist fought a duel over her.

According to the writer, Camilo Castelo Branco (1825-1890), Rey was "the greatest of all our romantic actresses". According to him she was "tall and elegant, with a kind of little-seen beauty and elegance".

== Death ==
Having been suffering from "fevers" for several years, Rey died at her home in Lisbon on 26 February 1866. It is said that she died of typhus, although a medical certificate submitted to the theatre before her death said that she was suffering from hemoptysis. An autopsy was carried out by the authorities on suspicion of a crime. After a crowded funeral procession, said to have been only surpassed in numbers by that of King Pedro V and one other, and which was reportedly the first funeral of an actress attended by women, she was buried at the Prazeres Cemetery in Lisbon in the space reserved for actors.
