= Lucinda Simões =

Portuguese stage actor and theatre impresario

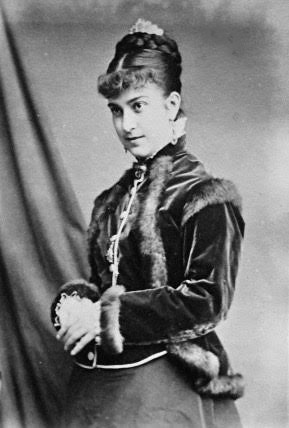
- Photo from the 1870s
- Born: Lucinda Augusta da Silva Borges; 17 December 1850; Lisbon, Portugal
- Died: 21 May 1928 (Aged 77); Lisbon, Portugal
- Resting place: Prazeres Cemetery, Lisbon
- Occupation: Actor
- Years active: 55
- Known for: Lisbon theatre
- Spouse: Luís Cândido Furtado Coelho
- Children: One son and one daughter

Lucinda Simões (1850 – 1928) was one of the most acclaimed Portuguese actors and theatre directors in the late 19th and early 20th centuries. The former Teatro Lucinda in Rio de Janeiro was named after her.

== Early life ==
Lucinda Augusta da Silva Borges was born on 17 December 1850 in the Portuguese capital of Lisbon. She was the daughter of the actor José Simões Nunes Borges and Maria José da Silva. Her father did not encourage his daughters to pursue theatrical careers and enrolled them in a private school. However, in 1865, at the age of 14, together with her sister Amélia, Lucinda participated in an amateur recital. Her professional debut took place on 16 October 1867, at the Teatro do Ginásio in Lisbon, at a performance attended by Queen D. Maria Pia, for which she received much applause and the Queen awarded her with a bracelet.

== Theatrical career ==
Simões then joined the theatre company of the Teatro do Ginásio, performing several comedies in 1868 and 1869, sometimes with her sister. She took lessons from Actor Taborda, one of Portugal's leading actors. She fell in love with another rising star, José António do Vale, but her father would not allow her to marry, resulting in Vale deciding to leave Portugal for Brazil in 1870, where he would stay for a decade. Simões performed at the Teatro Baquet in Porto in 1871, by which time she was already playing the lead. In the same year she went to Brazil, accompanied by her father. There she met, and in 1872 married, the theatrical entrepreneur Luís Cândido Furtado Coelho. The couple then travelled around Europe, returning to Portugal in November 1874 where they performed together at the Teatro das Variedades Dramáticas in Lisbon, including one play that was specially written for them by Fernando Caldeira.

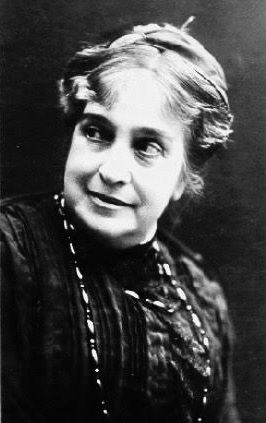
Simões at 63

In October 1876, Simões began a tour of Brazil with her husband, which lasted for three months. In Rio de Janeiro they performed at the Teatro Ginásio Dramático and the Theatro D. Pedro II. Together with her husband, Simões also toured in Spain and Argentina. She once said that "I was born in Lisbon, I got married in Brazil and I am Spanish at heart", and her performances in Madrid were enthusiastically received. Between 1877 and 1879 she and her husband rented the Teatro Carlos Gomes in Rio de Janeiro. In March 1879 she gave birth to twins, Lucília and Luciano. Lucília Simões would become as well known as an actor and impresario as her mother. On 3 July 1880, the Teatro Lucinda was opened in Rio de Janeiro. It was to close in 1909.

Simões continued to perform in the 1880s, after her husband ran into financial difficulties after some unwise investments in London. In 1891 they returned to Rio de Janeiro, where her husband managed a theatre group and she acted. Back in Lisbon in 1893, they formed a group to perform at the Teatro da Rua dos Condes. Simões then moved to the D. Maria II National Theatre in Lisbon. She had hoped that her daughter Lucília could make her debut at this theatre but there was opposition to the idea. Instead, she went with her daughter to Coimbra, rehearsing her for a successful debut. She then had a disagreement with the management of the D. Maria II National Theatre, with her contract being terminated in January 1895.

In the same year she formed the Lucinda Simões-Cristiano de Sousa Company, which began to perform at the Teatro da Rua dos Condes, with her daughter among the actors in the company. The plays were always extravagantly staged and one in particular, Madame Sans-Gêne, led to considerable losses. By this time separated from her husband, who died in 1900, Simões then toured Brazil again. Returning to Portugal, she and her daughter were hired by the Viscount de S. Luiz Braga to perform at the Teatro D. Amélia. Among other plays, they performed La Dame de chez Maxim, a farce by Georges Feydeau and A Doll's House by Henrik Ibsen. Later, by popular pressure, she returned to the D. Maria II National Theatre, performing Le Bourgeois gentilhomme by Molière, among other plays.

Simões continued to work in the Lisbon theatre in the 1910s, and also toured the Alentejo and Algarve regions of Portugal. In 1921 she appeared at the Teatro Politeama, performing Oscar Wilde's A Woman of No Importance. In 1922 she published an autobiography, titled Memórias:factos e impressões. In 1924 she went on a tour to Madrid and Barcelona. When not acting, she worked as a teacher at Lisbon's National Conservancy. She retired from the stage for health reasons in 1926, celebrating her career with a large party at the Teatro da Trindade in Lisbon. Lucinda Simões died on 21 May 1928.

== Honours and awards ==
- Simões was decorated with the Ancient, Most Noble and Enlightened Military Order of Saint James of the Sword of Scientific, Literary and Artistic Merit of Portugal.
- She received a Gold Medal from the School of Arts and Crafts of Rio de Janeiro.
- In Portugal, her name is part of the toponymy of Barreiro, Lisbon and Seixal.
- A theatrical award was named after her. Winners have included Palmira Bastos and Laura Alves.
