= Virgínia Dias da Silva =

Portuguese stage actress (1850–1922)

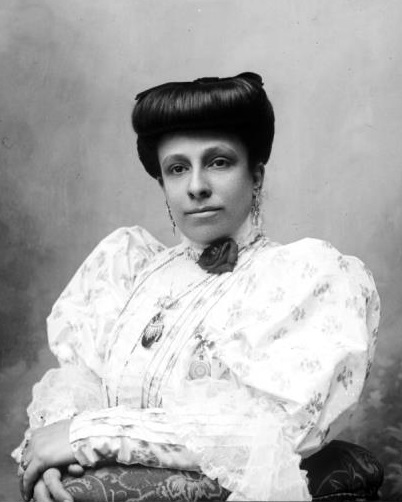
- Born: Virgínia Dias; 19 March 1850; Torres Novas, Portugal
- Died: 19 December 1922 Aged 72; Lisbon, Portugal
- Resting place: Prazeres Cemetery, Lisbon
- Other names: Actriz Virginia
- Occupation: Actor
- Years active: 40
- Known for: Lisbon theatre
- Spouse: Alfredo Ferreira da Silva
- Children: Maria Ema Ferreira da Silva
- Awards: Commander of the Military Order of Saint James of the Sword

Virgínia Dias da Silva ComSE (1850–1922), better known as Actriz Virginia (Actress Virginia), was a Portuguese stage actress.

== Early life ==
Virgínia Dias da Silva was born, on 19 March 1850 in the parish of Salvador in Torres Novas in the Santarém district of Portugal. She was the daughter of Simão Dias da Silva and Miquelina da Conceição, who both came from the same town. At a young age, she moved to the Portuguese capital, Lisbon, under the care of an aunt who wanted to employ her in a sewing workshop, something she was not happy about. She became interested in the theatre under the influence of her godfather, Rafael Rodrigues de Oliveira, a shareholder in the Teatro da Rua dos Condes in Lisbon. She began to audition at the age 13, with little success but after three years she joined the Teatro do Príncipe Real (later, the Teatro Apolo), owned by businessman César de Lima. On April 15, 1866, she debuted in a small role, in the 2-act comedy Mocidade e Honra (Youth and honour), in which she was well received.

== Career ==
Da Silva rapidly developed a successful career playing the ingénue. As she sang well she was given roles in comic operas, such as La Grande-Duchesse de Gérolstein by Henri Meilhac and Ludovic Halévy and Le pont des soupirs (The Bridge of Sighs) by Jacques Offenbach. In 1870 she joined the impresario, José Carlos dos Santos at the D. Maria II National Theatre in Lisbon where she changed from playing the ingénue to being the grande dame in numerous roles, including plays by Alexandre Dumas and Victor Hugo, taking the place vacated by Manuela Rey, an actress who died at a young age. At the age of 23, she was already considered the leading Portuguese actress. Da Silva remained first lady of the D. Maria II theatre for 27 consecutive years, only interrupted for one year at the Teatro da Trindade.

In 1880 she was one of the founders of the Society of Dramatic Artists theatre company, together with Augusto Rosa, Emília Cândida, Eduardo Brazão, Emília Cândida, Rosa Damasceno, and Joaquim de Almeida. After successive successes in Portugal, she went with part of the cast to Brazil in 1886 and 1887, to great acclaim.

== Later life ==
In 1906, Da Silva withdrew from the stage, apparently because of illness. The press mobilized for her to receive a pension from the State, a common practice for retired actors at the time. Towards the end of her life, at the age of 70, she appeared in one of the first silent feature films made in Portugal, entitled O Condenado (The Condemned), directed by Mário Huguin and Afonso Gaio, which premiered on 2 May 1921, at Cinema Olympia in Lisbon. On 17 April 1922, at the Teatro Nacional de São Carlos, on the initiative of the daily newspaper, the Diário de Notícias, a benefit party was organized for her. She, herself, had always been active in helping retired actors, including Emília Cândida, who experienced financial difficulties due to blindness and lack of a pension.

== Personal life ==
In 1892 in Porto, Da Silva married the actor, Alfredo Ferreira da Silva, with whom she already had a daughter, Maria Ema Ferreira da Silva. The couple divorced in 1914. At that time, it was rare for a woman to seek a divorce, particularly from a well-connected man such as her husband. A consequence was that she moved from living a life of comfort to a much more modest one, dependent on her pension.

== Awards and honours ==
In 1902, she was awarded the rank of Knight of the Military Order of Saint James of the Sword, and in 1920 she was made a Commander of the same order.

== Death ==
Da Silva died of heart failure on 19 December 1922, at her home in Lisbon. Her death was widely reported and the funeral was attended by hundreds of people. She was buried in the Tomb of Dramatic Artists, in the Prazeres Cemetery in Lisbon. The route of the funeral procession passed by the D. Maria II National Theatre, which was shrouded in black. The theatre's sextet played a funeral march as the coffin passed by.

Her name was later given to a street in Lisbon, in the Bairro dos Atores (Actors' quarter), and to one in her home town of Torres Novas. Teatro Virgínia in Torres Novas was named after her during her lifetime. As part of the commemorations of the first centenary of her birth, Torres Novas unveiled a plaque on the house where she was born, on Rua Alexandre Herculano.
