= Beatriz Rente =

Portuguese stage actor

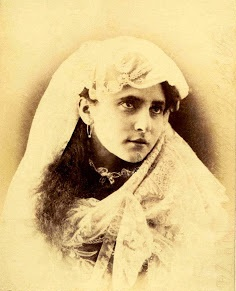
- Born: Beatriz Emília Rente; 22 January 1858; Portalegre, Portugal
- Died: 17 April 1907 Aged 49; Lisbon, Portugal
- Resting place: Prazeres Cemetery
- Occupation: actor
- Years active: 30
- Known for: Portuguese theatre
- Spouse: Eduardo Augusto Henriques Franco

Beatriz Rente (1858 – 1907) was a Portuguese theatre actor.

== Early life ==
Beatriz Emília Rente was born in the parish of Sé in Portalegre in Portugal on 22 January 1858, daughter of Joaquim Manuel Paes Rente and Joaquina Rita Duarte. Her father, who was a tailor and a member of an amateur dramatics group, died when she was only two and a half years old. She had four siblings. By 1861, she was living in a home for underprivileged children, where her maternal aunt worked.

== Acting career ==
Rente made her first performance in Portalegre when she was 12 years old, in the role of a beggar in a religious drama A Rainha Santa Isabel (The Saintly Queen Isabel). At the age of 15 she moved to Lisbon with her mother, living with her godmother, the actress Emília Adelaide, who came from the same parish. The director of the Teatro da Trindade, Francisco Palha, gave her a small role in a comedy that premiered on 30 October 1872. In November 1874, she debuted professionally at the D. Maria II National Theatre. This led to several further roles, including in Les Femmes Savantes by Molière.

Rente married when she was 16 on 14 April 1874 to Eduardo Augusto Henriques Franco, a reporter for the Diário de Notícias newspaper. They would later separate without having had children. For many years she lived with a Lisbon goldsmith. She remained at the D. Maria II theatre until 1877, when she moved to the Teatro do Ginásio with the Santos & Pinto Company. She stayed there for several years, always in leading roles, also making tours to Porto and other Portuguese cities. In 1883, she went to Brazil, and later, Madrid and Barcelona, together with the D. Maria II theatre company.

In 1900, Rente left the Ginásio and went to the Teatro da Rua dos Condes, where she stayed until 1902, performing comedy, drama and operetta. In 1902, she returned to the D. Maria II. However, at this time, a decline in her mental health began. She showed symptoms of melancholy, allegedly caused by the way she was treated by some professional colleagues on her return to D. Maria II. She also suffered from a worsening liver disease.

== Death ==
Beatriz Rente died on 17 April 1907 in Lisbon, a victim of cirrhosis. As a tribute, the D. Maria II, Ginásio and Trindade theatres all closed on the 17th and 18th. She is buried in Lisbon's Prazeres Cemetery. Rente is remembered in her home town by a street named after her.
