= Lucília Simões =

Portuguese actress

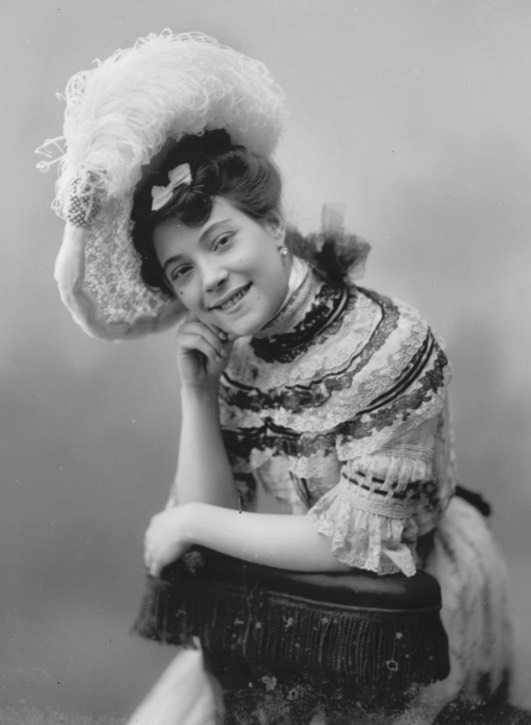
- Born: Lucília Cândida Simões Furtado Coelho; 2 April 1879; Rio de Janeiro, Brazil
- Died: 8 June 1962 (aged 83); Lisbon, Portugal
- Resting place: Prazeres Cemetery, Lisbon
- Occupation: Actress
- Spouse: Erico Braga
- Parents: Furtado Coelho (father); Lucinda Simões (mother)

Lucília Simões (2 April 1879 – 8 June 1962) was a Brazilian-born Portuguese actress, stage director and impresario.

== Early life ==
Lucília Cândida Simões Furtado Coelho was the daughter of the acclaimed Portuguese actress Lucinda Simões and of the actor and impresario Furtado Coelho. She was born on 2 April 1879 in Rio de Janeiro, Brazil when her parents were performing there. She had a twin brother, Luciano Simões, who was also an actor. They moved to Portugal at a young age. Despite lacking encouragement from her parents to take up a theatrical career, she had a clear vocation for the theatre. Her first performance, unpaid, was at the Teatro Avenida in Coimbra, on 4 May 1895, in the second act of the play Frei Luís de Sousa (Brother Luis de Sousa) by Almeida Garrett, playing opposite her grandfather José Simões Nunes Borges, who was better known as Actor Simões. Her professional debut took place in December 1895, at the Teatro da Rua dos Condes in Lisbon, as part of her mother's company, in the play Madame Sans-Gêne, by Victorien Sardou and Émile Moreau. Although the role she played was not a major one, she received considerable applause and many favourable reviews.

== Acting career ==
In 1897, Simões accompanied her mother on a tour of Brazil, where she achieved great success in Madame San-Gêne. Shortly after returning to Portugal, she was hired by the D. Maria II National Theatre, where she debuted in a play called Família Americana. This caused conflict with the actress Rosa Damasceno, who was in residence at that theatre and, despite her age, did not want to give up the role of the "naΪf" to younger artists. In 1898, she toured with her mother to Coimbra, playing at the Teatro Circo Príncipe Real in A Doll's House, by Henrik Ibsen, the first time a work by Ibsen had been performed in Portugal. The play was very successful and her performance as "Nora" is considered to have been the first great success of her acting career. It was later performed at the Teatro do Ginásio in Lisbon, but only on Tuesdays, which was the rest day for the resident company. Its success was so great that the seats sold out hours after the tickets were put on sale.

Simões then returned to Brazil, in a company run and organized by her mother and the actor Cristiano de Sousa. The success of A Doll's House in Rio de Janeiro was so great that the expenses of traveling to Brazil were fully covered within a month. She remained in Brazil for 18 months, with great popularity. After a short trip back to Portugal, she again returned to Brazil as the star of the company. In 1901, she joined the Rosas & Brazão theatre company, performing at the Teatro D. Amélia. There she consolidated herself as one of the major actors in Portugal. She played La Dame de chez Maxim, a farce by Georges Feydeau and some of the pieces she had debuted in Brazil. Contrary to her mother's wish that they return together to Brazil, she decided to remain at the Teatro D. Amélia, where she stayed for 8 years.

== Withdrawal from acting and return to the stage ==
In 1908, for reasons that are not clear, she withdrew from the theatre, not returning until 1921 when she performed in Oscar Wilde's A Woman of No Importance at the Teatro Politeama in Lisbon. In 1923 she married the actor, Erico Braga, with whom she founded a theatrical company, touring Portugal and Brazil. She then spent five years at the Teatro Nacional de São Carlos. Later, they moved to the Teatro da Trindade, also in Lisbon, before once again playing at the Teatro do Ginásio. She would later move back to the Teatro da Trindade. Divorcing Erico Braga, Simões joined the Rey Colaço-Robles Monteiro theatre company at the Teatro Nacional de São Carlos. She also made three films, notably A Vizinha do Lado directed by António Lopes Ribeiro.

Simões retired from acting in 1953. A farewell gala performance was organized for her on 9 June 1953. She died in Lisbon on 8 June 1962 and is buried in the Prazeres Cemetery.

== Awards and honours ==
- Lucília Simões was made a Commander of the Military Order of Saint James of the Sword
- She was awarded the Palme d'Or of the Académie Française for her theatrical work
- Two roads have been named after her in Portugal, in Almada and in the Benfica (Lisbon) district of Lisbon.
