= Émile Doux =

French/Brazilian theatre manager and director

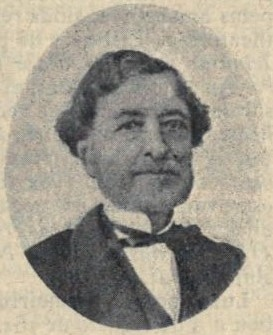
- Born: 1798; France
- Died: 1876 Aged 77 or 78; Rio de Janeiro, Brazil
- Occupation(s): Theatrical director and manager
- Known for: Portuguese and Brazilian theatre

Émile Doux (1798–1876), known in Portugal and Brazil as Emílio Doux, was a French theatre actor, director, playwright and impresario in Portugal and later in Brazil.

== Career ==
Little is known about the early life of Doux, other than that he was a graduate of the Conservatoire de Paris. In the 1830s he joined a theatre company led by Paul Charton and his wife that travelled to the Portuguese capital, Lisbon, to give some performances in French, with Roux first performing with the company at the Teatro da Rua dos Condes in January 1835. The company presented romantic dramas by Victor Hugo and Alexandre Dumas, comedies by Eugène Scribe, melodramas and vaudevilles. With the return of the company to France, Doux decided to stay in Lisbon, becoming one of the most important characters in Lisbon's theatrical history, working as an impresario and as a rehearser. Doux improved the quality of the theatre in Lisbon, introducing new genres and styles of acting, notably promoting interest in Romanticism. His staging of Um auto de Gil Vicente, by Almeida Garrett in 1838 is considered to have inaugurated Portuguese romantic theatre. His management was considered as successful and of high quality but in 1840 the management of the theatre passed into the hands of the Count of Farrobo, who kept Doux as a rehearser. In contrast to the period when Doux had full control, Farrobo's three-year management was not financially successful, a fact attributed to the dubious choice of repertoire and the financial extravagances in paying high fees to the artists and setting up the shows.

During the Patuleia, or Little Civil War, in 1846–1847, theatrical activities in Lisbon were disrupted. After it was over the owners of the Teatro do Ginásio sought out Doux to ask him to take over directing at the theatre. This he did with some success, in part by introducing vaudeville. During his 20 years in Lisbon, Doux directed at the Rua dos Condes, the Ginásio, the Teatro do Salitre, and the Teatro D. Fernando. He trained and directed a large number of actors who would become popular, including Teodorico Baptista da Cruz, Epifânio Aniceto Gonçalves, Joaquim José Tasso, Emília das Neves, Delphina do Espírito Santo, Carlota Talassi, Ana Cardoso, and Emília Cândida. Doux's history in Portugal, however, was not only marked by successes. Clashes with businessmen, local artists and the press were regular events, making him move to Brazil in 1851.

In Rio de Janeiro, he teamed up with the Brazilian actor, João Caetano, the greatest Brazilian actor of the period, and also worked with the young group of actors, remaining active for another 20 years. He worked at the Teatro São Pedro in Rio de Janeiro, again introducing vaudevilles. He then moved to the Teatro Ginásio Dramático, which was in competition with João Caetano. Doux was highly praised by the Brazilian dramatist, José de Alencar, and by Machado de Assis, widely regarded as the greatest Brazilian writer. At the beginning of the 1860s, Doux started working at the Companhia de Ópera Nacional, which had been founded in 1858.

== Death ==
Doux died in 1876 in Rio de Janeiro, shortly after having become a Brazilian citizen.
