= João do Rio =

Brazilian journalist, short-story writer, and playwright

João Paulo Emilio Cristóvão dos Santos Coelho Barreto
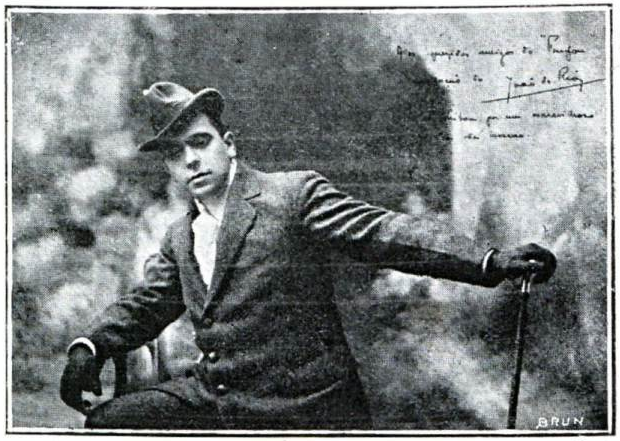
- Born: August 5, 1881; Rio de Janeiro, Rio de Janeiro, Brazil
- Died: June 23, 1921 (aged 39); Rio de Janeiro
- Occupations: Journalist, playwright, publisher
- Writing career
- Pen name: João do Rio
- Genre: Fiction

João do Rio was the pseudonym of the Brazilian journalist, short-story writer and playwright João Paulo Emílio Cristóvão dos Santos Coelho Barreto (August 5, 1881, Rio de Janeiro – June 23, 1921, Rio de Janeiro), a Brazilian author and journalist of African descent. He was elected on May 7, 1910 for the chair # 26 of Brazilian Academy of Letters.

== Life ==
Son of Alfredo Coelho Barreto (a Mathematics teacher and positivist), and Florência dos Santos Barreto (housewife), Paulo Barreto was born in Hospício St., 284 (current Buenos Aires St., in Rio de Janeiro's downtown). He took Portuguese classes in the traditional Colégio de São Bento (São Bento School), where he started to exert his natural endowment for literature. At the age of 15, he was admitted in the National Gymnasium; today, Colégio Pedro II (D. Pedro II school).

On June 1, 1899, with less than 18 years, he had a text published for the first time in a newspaper, A Tribuna. Signed with his own name, it was a review entitled Lucília Simões about Ibsen's play A Doll's House, performed in Santana Theater (currently Carlos Gomes Theater).

Prolific writer, between 1900 and 1903 he collaborated under various pen names with some prominent publications of the time as O Paiz, O Dia (not the same newspaper of today), Correio Mercantil, O Tagarela and O Coió. In 1903, he was appointed by Nilo Peçanha for the newspaper Gazeta de Notícias, where he would stay until 1913. It was in this periodical that his most famous pseudonym was born, João do Rio, when on November 26, 1903 he signed an article called O Brasil Lê (Brazil Reads), an inquiry about the literary preferences of the Carioca reader. And, as indicated by Gomes (1996, p. 44), "from this time forth, the name that fixes the literary identity swallows Paulo Barreto. Under this mask he will publish all his books and cultivates his fame. Next to the name, the name of the city".

=== Journalism ===
According to his biographers, Barreto represented the outgrowth of a new type of journalist in the Brazilian press of the beginning of the 20th century. Until then, the literary and journalistic practice by intellectuals was regarded as of little account, a lesser activity for people with many vacant hours (e.g., public servants). Paulo Barreto moved the literary creation frontwards and started to live from this, using his pen names (more than ten) to attract various audiences.

==== As religiões no Rio ====
Between February and March 1904, he carried through a series of news articles entitled As religiões no Rio (The religions in Rio). Beyond its character of "investigative journalism", it constitutes an important anthropological and sociological analysis, early recognized as such, particularly by the four pioneering texts about African cults, which precedes in more than a quarter of century the publications by Nina Rodrigues on the subject (beyond that, the works of Rodrigues were in large measure restricted to the academic circles of Bahia).

Scholars had pointed out similarities between "As religiões no Rio" and the book "Les petites réligions de Paris" (1898), by French writer Jules Bois. However, the similarity seems to be much more in the general idea (an inquiry on the manifestations of religious minorities in a big city) than in the plan of the formal accomplishment.

The news articles series led to interest that Barreto published them in book form, and distributed more than 8,000 copies in six years.

Some biographers criticize Barreto for the fact that, when he realised the bonanza he could obtain by the publication of collections (something that would become common in Brazil in the second half of 20th century), he developed a "formula" to inflate his own bibliography.

=== Later career ===
Elected for the Brazilian Academy of Letters in his third attempt (1910), Paulo Barreto was the first person to be admitted there wearing the now famous "fardão dos imortais" (the "robe of the immortals"). Years later, with the election of his adversary, the poet Humberto de Campos, Barreto moved away from the institution. According to some biographers, when informed of his death, his mother ordered that the funeral service should not be held at the Academy hall, as usual for members, because her son would not have approved the idea.

In 1920, Barreto established the periodical A Pátria (The Fatherland, ironically called A Mátria–or The Motherland– by his detractors), in which he sought to defend the interests of the Poveiros, Portuguese fishermen from Póvoa do Varzim that supplied with fishes the city of Rio de Janeiro. Threatened by a fishing nationalization law decreed by the Brazilian government, the Poveiros went on strike.

The activity of Barreto in favor of the Portuguese colony brought to him a lot of enemies, numberless moral offences (leaf lard with two eyes was one of the lightest) and even a despicable episode of physical aggression: entrapped alone when he took a meal in a restaurant, he was beaten by a group of nationalists.

=== Sexuality ===
Since early, the sexual preferences of Barreto brought forth suspicion (and, later, gibe) among his contemporaries. Bachelor, without girlfriend or known mistress, many of his texts transpire a sufficiently explicit homoerotic inclination. The suspicion was eventually confirmed when he presented himself as promoter in Brazil of the "cursed" Oscar Wilde, whose works he translated into Portuguese. Historians have labeled him as a "notable black homosexual writer".

An odd person, dressed like a "fashion plate" (Rodrigues, 1996, p. 239), Barreto never dared to defy the stereotypes of that era. However, for aspiring to defend new ideas in social and political fields, his "voluminous, thick-lipped and dark figure with a very smooth coat" (as registered by Gilberto Amado) became a perfect target for all sorts of reactionaries, homophobics and racists like Humberto de Campos.

His presumed "flirt" with Isadora Duncan in 1916 (when she was performing in the Theatro Municipal of Rio de Janeiro), expresses this sexual ambiguity. Duncan and Barreto had met previously in Portugal, but it was only during her performance in Rio that they became close. The exact level of this intimacy is a mystery. Rodrigues (1996) talks about a factoid or hype, an expedient to attract the attention of the press, whilst other sources cite a supposed dialogue where the dancer would have questioned Barreto about his pederasty, and he would have answered in French: Je suis très corrompu (I am very corrupted).

=== Death ===
Overweight, Barreto was feeling ill during all June 23, 1921. He took a taxi and, with the increase of the malaise, he asked the driver to stop the car and bring him a glass of water. However, before help could arrive, he died of a sudden myocardial infarct.

The news about João do Rio's death quickly spread all over the city. A guessed number of 100,000 people went to the burial of the writer that years before, under the pen name of Godofredo de Alencar, had registered his preferential option for the diversity:

In organized societies only the elites and the scoundrel are of interest. Because they are unpredictable and alike in the courage of their resources and their absence of scruples. (Gomes, 1996, p.69).

The name Paulo Barreto christens an ordinary street in the quarter of Botafogo, in Rio de Janeiro. As Graciliano Ramos pointed out, the homage made is modest: they had offered a short street to him (Gomes, 1996, p. 11). His name is also the name of a square in Lisbon, Portugal, where there is a small monument in his honour (containing the following citation "The Portuguese owe me nothing for loving and defending Portuguese people, for that way I love, worship, and long for my motherland twice."/"Nada me devem os portugueses por amar e defender portugueses, porque assim amo, venero e e quero duas vezes a minha pátria.").

== Chronology ==
- 1881: Paulo Barreto is born on August 5.
- 1896: admitted to the National Gymnasium (now, Colégio Pedro II).
- 1898: Bernardo Gutemberg, youngest brother of Paulo Barreto, dies.
- 1899: first text published on June 1.
- 1900: starts to write for some newspapers in Rio.
- 1902: tries to enter the diplomatic service, but is diplomatically refused by the Baron of Rio Branco, supposedly for being fat, mulatto and homosexual (Gomes, 1996, p. 114).
- 1903: by means of Nilo Peçanha, starts work at the Gazeta de Notícias, where he would remain up to 1913.
- 1904: between February and March, he carries through the series of news articles As religiões in Rio (The religions in Rio) for the Gazeta , later turned into book.
- 1905: in November, becomes lecturer.
- 1906: debut his first play, the review Chic-Chic (written in partnership with journalist J. Brito).
- 1907: his drama Clotilde is staged in the theater Recreio Dramático. In the same year, he was candidate for the second time to the Brazilian Academy of Letters.
- 1908: in December, makes his first voyage to Europe, having visited Portugal, London and Paris.
- 1909: in March, Barreto's father dies and he and his mother moved to the old quarter of Lapa (in separate houses, however). In November, he launches a book for children, Era uma vez... (Once upon a time...), in partnership with Viriato Correia.
- 1910: is elected to the Brazilian Academy of Letters. In December, makes a second voyage to Europe and visits Lisbon, Porto, Madrid, Barcelona, Paris, the French Riviera and Italy.
- 1911: with a loan supplied by Barreto, Irineu Marinho leaves the Gazeta and launches in June the periodical A Noite (The Night). One year later, he quits integrally the loan.
- 1912: is launched Oscar Wilde's book Intentions, in a translation by Barreto.
- 1913: becomes foreigner correspondent of the Sciences Academy of Lisbon. In November, makes his third voyage to Europe, having visited Lisbon (where his play A Bela Madame Vargas – The Beautiful Madame Vargas – is staged with great success), Paris, Germany, Istanbul, Russia, Greece, Jerusalem and Cairo.
- 1915: travels to Argentina and falls in love with the country. He declares that Buenos Aires is the gaucho London (Gomes, 1996, p. 120).
- 1916: becomes friends with Isadora Duncan, during her performance at the Municipal Theater of Rio de Janeiro. Side by side with Gilberto Amado, he would have witnessed Duncan dancing naked under the moonlight, near the Cascatinha, a little waterfall in the National Park of Tijuca.
- 1917: on May 22, writes for O Paiz a chronicle named Praia Maravilhosa (Wonderful Beach) where he exalts the wonders of the beach of Ipanema. He is gifted with two lots in the future quarter, where he starts to dwell in this same year. He establishes and starts to direct the SBAT (Brazilian Society of Theater Actors).
- 1918: travels to Europe to cover the conference on armistice in Versailles, after World War I.
- 1919: publishes the story book A mulher e os espelhos (The woman and the mirrors).
- 1920: establishes the newspaper A Pátria (The Fatherland ), where he defends the cause of the Portuguese colony in Rio. Due to this, he is subjected to moral offences and physical aggression.
- 1921: on June 23, he dies of myocardial infarction. His burial is followed by more than 100,000 persons.

== João Do Rio in the Mass Culture ==
João Do Rio has been portrayed in Brazilian cinema and television. He was played by José Lewgoy in the movie Taboo (1982) and by Otávio Augusto in the movie Brasilia 18% (2006).

== Works ==
- As religiões no Rio. Paris: Garnier, 1904? – (é certo que contém uma crônica escrita em 1904)
- O memento literário. Paris: Garnier, 1905?
- A alma encantadora das ruas. Paris: Garnier, 1908.
- Era uma vez... (em co-autoria com Viriato Correia). Rio de Janeiro: Francisco Alves, 1909.
- Cinematographo: crônicas cariocas. Porto: Lello & Irmão, 1909.
- Fados, canções e danças de Portugal. Paris: Garnier, 1910.
- Dentro da noite. Paris: Garnier, 1910.
- A profissão de Jacques Pedreira. Paris: Garnier, 1911.
- Psicologia urbana: O amor carioca; O figurino; O flirt; A delícia de mentir; Discurso de recepção. Paris: Garnier, 1911.
- Vida vertiginosa. Paris: Garnier, 1911.
- Portugal d'agora. Paris: Garnier, 1911.
- Os dias passam.... Porto: Lello & Irmão, 1912.
- A bela madame Vargas. Rio de Janeiro: Briguiet, 1912?
- Eva. Rio de Janeiro: Villas Boas, 1915.
- Crônicas e frases de Godofredo de Alencar. Lisboa: Bertrand, 1916?
- Pall-Mall Rio: o inverno carioca de 1916. Rio de Janeiro: Villas Boas, 1917.
- Nos tempos de Venceslau. Rio de Janeiro: Villas Boas, 1917.
- Sésamo. Rio de Janeiro: Francisco Alves, 1917.
- A correspondência de um estação de cura. Rio de Janeiro: Leite Ribeiro & Maurílio, 1918.
- A mulher e os espelhos. Lisboa: Portugal-Brasil, 1919?
- Na conferência da Paz. 3 v. Rio de Janeiro: Villas Boas, 1919–20.
- Adiante!. Paris: Aillaud; Lisboa: Bertrand, 1919.
- Ramo de loiro: notícias em louvor. Paris: Aillaud; Lisboa: Bertrand, 1921.
- Rosário da ilusão.... Lisboa: Portugal-Brasil; Rio de Janeiro: Americana, 1921?
- Celebridades, desejo. Ed. póstuma. Rio de Janeiro: Centro Luso-Brasileiro Paulo Barreto, 1932.

== Translations ==
- Religions in Rio – Bilingual Edition (As Religiões no Rio), translated by Ana Lessa-Schmidt. Hanover, Conn.:New London Librarium, 2015. ISBN 978-0-9905899-8-3
- Vertiginous Life – Bilingual Edition (Vida Vertiginosa), translated by Ana Lessa-Schmidt. Hanover, Conn.:New London Librarium, 2017. ISBN 978-0-9985436-0-4
