= Georgina Ribas =

Portuguese pianist, composer, and activist in support of Africans in Portugal

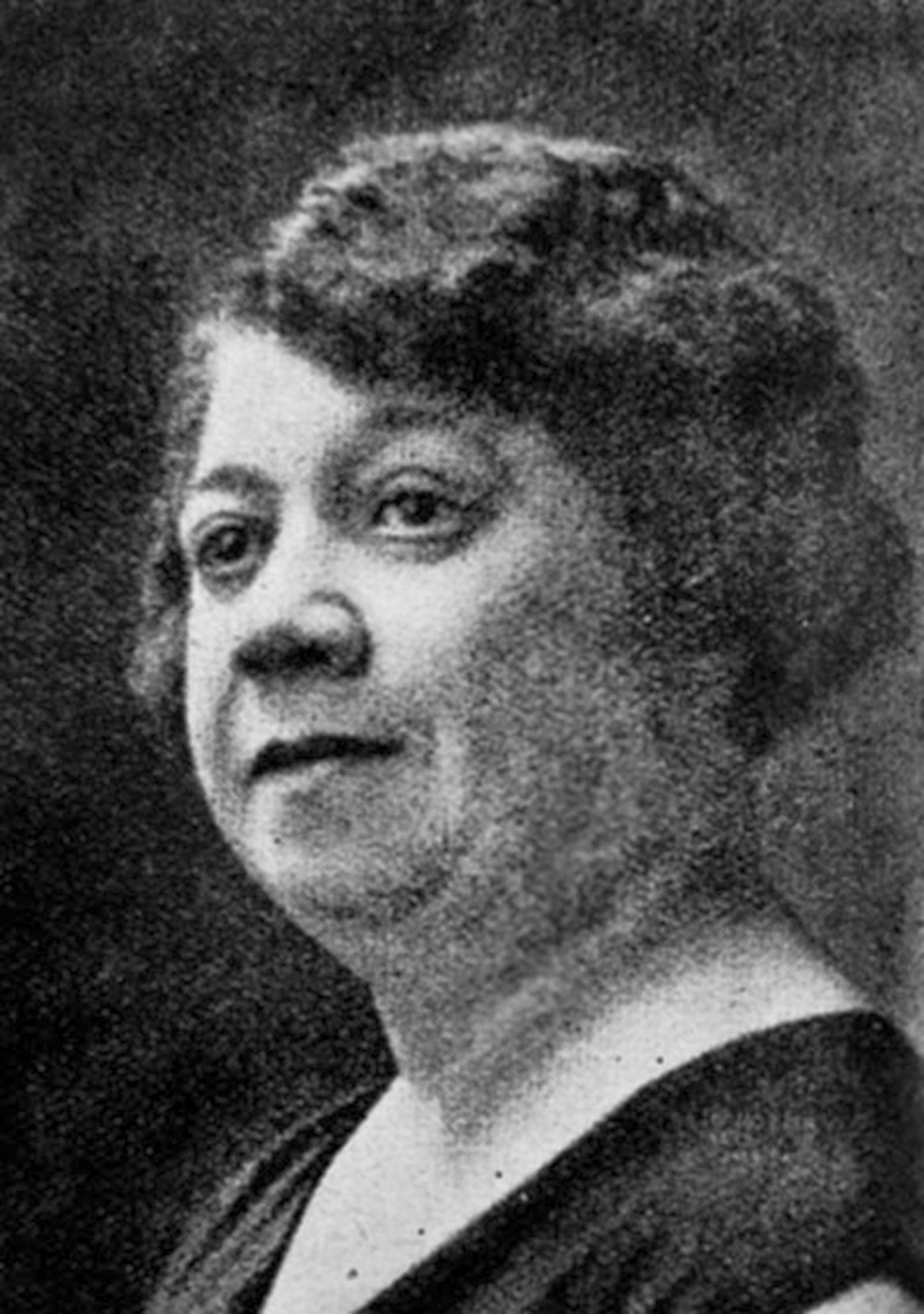
- Born: 1882; Angola
- Died: 1951 (aged 68–69)
- Known for: Co-founder of the African Guild in Lisbon in 1929

Georgina Ribas (1882-1951), was a pianist, musicologist, music teacher and leader of several African and African women's organizations in Portugal.

== Early life ==
Georgina Ribas was born in 1882 in Angola, at that time a Portuguese colony. Her father was a Brazilian merchant and her mother Angolan and they moved to Portugal when Ribas was three years old. She graduated as a pianist from the National Conservatory of Lisbon and worked as a music teacher in the Rossio area of the Portuguese capital.

== Activities ==
In addition to teaching music, Ribas also composed. In 1934, she worked on a Revista or vaudeville show called Vista Alegre, performed at Lisbon's Teatro do Ginásio, as co-composer with José Filipe Lopes da Costa, a violinist, conductor, composer and arranger. She also collaborated with Luís de Oliveira Guimarães, founder and first president of the Portuguese Society of Authors, in the play Corridinho.

Even with racism and sexism present in Portuguese society, some black women managed to stand out. Georgina Ribas exerted great social and moral influence on the African intellectuals then residing in the Portuguese capital. In 1929, she became involved in the leadership of the African Women's League, or African Women's Movement, an organization that was part of the African National League, which had about 5,000 members distributed in the different neighbourhoods of Lisbon. The League distributed a newspaper, Tribuna D'Africa, which in 1913 opposed the government's decision not to grant the right to vote to women. In the same issue it reported on the death of the British suffragist, Emily Davison, calling her a martyr of revolutionary feminism. In general, however, it sought peaceful co-existence with the government and was funded out of monies allocated to the Angolan colony.

Also in 1929, together with Maria Dias d'Alva Teixeira, Vice President of the League of African Women, and Maria Nazareth Ascenso, then Secretary of Assistance for the African National Party, she formed the African Guild. The Guild had as its main objectives: "to compete for the social and mental prestige of Africans, to congregate and to strengthen the bonds of a union and solidarity between the natives of Africa and the national races and promote the raising of the intellectual level and physical reinvigoration of the indigenous people of Portuguese Africa". Like Ribas, many of its members were of mixed-race.
