= Emília Adelaide =

Portuguese stage actor and theatre impresario (1836–1905)

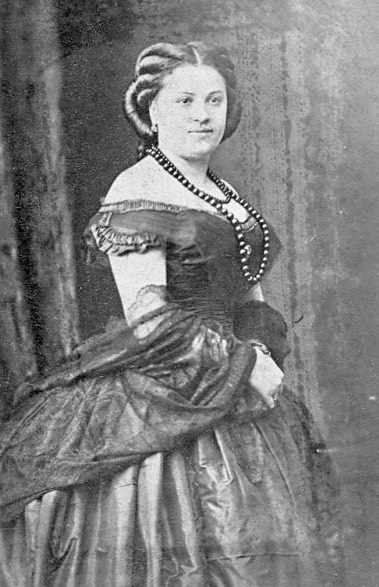
- Born: Emília Adelaide Pimentel; 1 November 1836; Portalegre, Portugal
- Died: 11 September 1905 (Aged 68); Lisbon, Portugal
- Resting place: Prazeres Cemetery, Lisbon
- Occupation: Actor
- Known for: Lisbon and Rio de Janeiro theatre

Emília Adelaide (1 November 1836 – 11 September 1905) was a Portuguese actress and theatre company manager in the 19th century.

== Early life ==
Emília Adelaide Pimentel was born on 1 November 1836, in the parish of Sé, close to Portalegre in the east of Portugal. She was the daughter of Luís Dias and Maria José Pimentel. Her father moved to Lisbon to look for a better job and soon stopped contacting the family. At the age of 11 she went with her mother and two sisters to Castelo Branco, looking for work. When she was 18 she moved with her mother to Lisbon and found work as a seamstress.

== Early acting career ==
Adelaide started acting on the advice of Ernesto Biester, a playwright, director and impresario, with whom she had an affair. Biester went on to write almost exclusively for her. She also enrolled at the Lisbon Conservatory. Her first performance was at the D. Maria II National Theatre in 1856, in a one-act comedy. Biester then gave her an important role in the play A Caridade na Sombra, in which she achieved public acclaim. She continued to achieve regular successes in the same theatre company, including a tour to Porto in 1863. In the same year she performed at Lisbon's Teatro do Ginásio.

== Paris ==
Adelaide then travelled to London and Paris to study theatre, staying in Paris for three months. At the time, the five-act comedy, La Famille Benoîton, by Victorien Sardou had just premiered. When she returned to Lisbon she demanded that it be presented, with a translation by Biester, enabling her to apply all of the acting techniques she had learned while in Paris. She appeared in a luxurious dress by the British "father of haute couture", Charles Frederick Worth.

== Later career ==
She then went on to perform several important roles, including the part of Catarina in Angelo, Tyrant of Padua by Victor Hugo, when she performed alongside Emília das Neves, considered to be the greatest Portuguese actress of the era. She was then hired by the impresario Francisco Palha to join the company of the Teatro da Trindade, which was at the time under construction. They performed temporarily at the Teatro da Rua dos Condes. In November 1867, she played in the first performance at the Trindade, in a comedy by Biester, alongside Delphina. In 1869, she performed in Morgadinha de Valflor, written for her by Pinheiro Chagas, which became one of her greatest triumphs.

Founding her own company, Adelaide toured Portugal and its islands. In 1871, at the height of her fame, she went to Brazil at the invitation of the actor and impresario, Furtado Coelho. The financial success of the tour encouraged her to form a larger company (Companhia Dramática Portugueza de Emília Adelaide Pimentel), but this was to prove unprofitable. In 1871, she returned to the D. Maria II, staying there until 1875 in plays by Biester and others. In 1880 she returned to Brazil, for a successful tour. Returning to Lisbon she again formed her own company. Her last role was performed at the D. Maria II.

António de Sousa Bastos, in his work Diccionario do theatro portuguez (1908), recalls the actress in the following way: "She was beautiful, captivating, she had a lovely smile, an expressive and gentle look, a seductive voice, full of tears when it was necessary, finally all the skills required of an actress". She was one of the muses of the painter Miguel Ângelo Lupi, who made a portrait of her that was exhibited in London in 1866 and at the Universal Exhibition in Paris in 1867.

After retirement from the stage, she went back to Rio de Janeiro where she founded an important fashion business, returning to Lisbon in 1902. Already relatively forgotten by the public, and away from the stage, living modestly with her sister, Emília Adelaide Pimentel died on 11 September 1905, being buried in the Prazeres Cemetery. She never married, nor did she have children. Her name lives on as part of the toponymy of Amadora (Venda Nova parish) and Sintra (Rio de Mouro parish).
