= Emília das Neves =

Portuguese stage actor

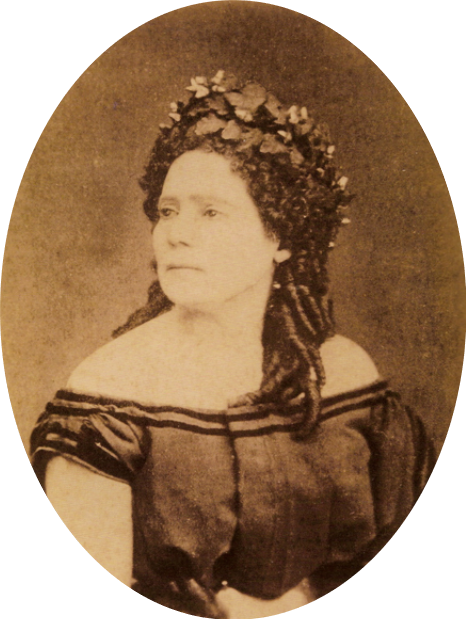
- Born: Emília das Neves de Sousa; 5 August 1820; Benfica, Lisbon, Portugal
- Died: 19 December 1883 Aged 63; Lisbon
- Other name: Linda Emília
- Occupation: actor
- Years active: 40
- Known for: Lisbon theatre
- Partner: Luís da Câmara Leme

Emília das Neves (also known as Linda Emília) (1820 – 1883) was a Portuguese actress. She is considered to have been the most notable Portuguese actress of her time and be the first great female star to emerge in Portugal.

== Early life ==
Emília das Neves de Sousa was born on 5 August 1820. She was the daughter of Manuel de Sousa, who came from Angra do Heroísmo, on Terceira Island in the Portuguese islands of the Azores. Her mother was Benta de Sousa who, like her daughter, was born in the parish of Benfica, now part of Lisbon. Emília had a sister, Marie Clara, who also became an actress. In 1838, she was living in poor circumstance in Lisbon at the home of someone who knew some of the actors at the Teatro da Rua dos Condes. One day, an actor offered her and some friends free tickets for the Condes. She was so entranced by the performance and the actor, in turn, was so impressed with her ability to reproduce part of the show she had seen, that he introduced her to the theatre where, although lacking any education, she was given lessons by the director, Émile Doux. Doux had arrived in Portugal at the end of the Portuguese Civil War in 1835 with a French theatre company and stayed after it returned to France, taking charge of a new Portuguese theatre company.

== Beginning of acting career ==
Neves initially played a small role in a comedy at the Condes, where she was seen by the writer Almeida Garrett who asked for her to be in the cast of his new play, Um auto de Gil Vicente. This was first performed on 15 August 1838, and came to be considered the first example of romanticism on the Portuguese stage. Other actors included Delphina and João Anastácio Rosa. At this debut Neves received considerable applause and very favourable reviews in the newspapers, resulting in the impresario tripling her salary within a fortnight. It is said that Garrett bought all her dresses and taught her to play the parts. In February 1839, she signed a contract with the Teatro da Rua dos Condes, in which she undertook to only work for that theatre. Two interesting clauses in the contract specified that (1) she had to provide all of her clothes, and (2) that she was entitled to 15 days of sick leave unless the illnesses were the result of "bad behaviour", i.e. venereal disease, which would lead to suspension of the contract.

In 1840, Émile Doux left the Teatro da Rua dos Condes and Neves was persuaded to join the company at the Teatro Nacional de São Carlos by the owner, the Count of Farrobo, at a salary five times her starting salary at the Condes. She returned to the Condes in 1841, which by this time had also been taken over by the Count of Farrobo. In 1842, she performed in Les Premières Armes de Richelieu by Eugène Scribe, a play that had been taken to Lisbon by Émile Doux. This was the first play to address the subject of transvestism on the Portuguese stage and it was criticised for being indecent. However, the resounding success of Neves in the play resulted in it proving impossible for the authorities to ban it. After the Count of Farrabo left the Teatro da Rua dos Condes in 1843, the new management found it impossible to pay the high salaries he had been paying Neves and other actors and she briefly left Lisbon and went to perform in Porto, returning to the Condes in 1844.

== A new theatre ==
In 1846, she was invited to join the permanent cast of the new D. Maria II National Theatre, where she was classified as “Absolute first lady”. A high salary was agreed and she was also entitled to two benefit performances. After her past experiences she had the contract specify that she would not have to play a transvestite and that she would not have to sing. The theatre also agreed that she should not perform two pieces on one night and that she should perform in no more than 14 different pieces in a year. However, after one year her contract was not renewed as the theatre company claimed it was too expensive. Neves then joined other companies one play at a time, working in the Teatro Camões in Porto, and the Teatro do Salitre in Lisbon. In 1849, the Teatro D. Fernando opened in Lisbon. The director was Emíle Doux, and the cast featured Neves, who had been hired on a long-term contract. However, after seven months the company went bankrupt.

== Touring ==
Neves then went to Porto, performing at the São João National Theatre. She already had a reputation of being a difficult character and was reported to have behaved very badly there, refusing admittance to the theatre for all journalists apart from her two favourites. In June 1851, she returned to Lisbon to play at the São Carlos and again attracted considerable controversy. Among her supporters was her lover, the Portuguese soldier and politician Luís da Câmara Leme. Despite having written in an earlier contract that she would not play a transvestite, several of her roles in the early 1850s involved playing transvestites. In 1858, she returned to Porto with her own company, also playing in Braga and Coimbra. Unable to return to Lisbon on terms and conditions that she found acceptable, she again formed her own company in 1862 and toured Portugal and Spain. However, her difficult relations with the other cast members meant that the company was dissolved in 1863, resulting in her return to Teatro D. Maria II in Lisbon.

On 29 May 1864, Neves sailed for Brazil to perform, returning on 3 January 1866. On her return she joined the cast of the Francisco Palha Company, at the Teatro D. Maria II. In 1867 she was in Molière's Le Malade Imaginaire at the Teatro do Ginásio before performing at the new Teatro da Trindade. In 1873 she performed with a new company at the Teatro do Ginásio, being given 15 curtain calls. She continued to work until her retirement in 1880, primarily with the Teatro D. Maria II but also elsewhere in Lisbon and in Porto. After retiring she returned to the stage once, to join a charity performance in Porto.

== Retirement ==
From the 1860s, Neves supported many charities, such as those helping orphans, and also assisted the families of deceased former colleagues. She died on 19 December 1883 in Santa Justa in Lisbon. Her funeral cortege had 70 carriages and many speeches were made at the funeral. In her life it is believed that she performed in a total of 217 different pieces. Five years after her death, a marble bust of Emília das Neves, by António Soares dos Reis, was unveiled in the foyer of the Teatro D. Maria II. In 1911, her name was given to a street in Benfica and there are other streets named after her in Caparica and Fernão Ferro, both in the Lisbon Metropolitan Area.
