= Emília Cândida =

Portuguese stage actor

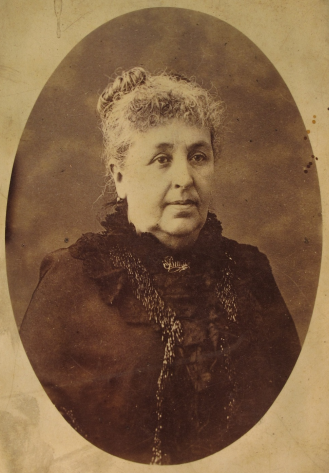
- Born: Emília Cândida Madeira; 18 May 1823; Lisbon, Portugal
- Died: 11 February 1908 (aged 84); Lisbon, Portugal
- Occupations: actor and dancer
- Years active: 40
- Known for: Lisbon theatre

Emília Cândida (1823–1908) was a popular 19th century Portuguese actress.

== Early life ==
Emília Cândida Madeira was born in the Portuguese capital of Lisbon on 18 May 1823, the daughter of poor farmers. Her name was given to her in honour of her baptismal godmother. She first danced on the stage at the Teatro Nacional de São Carlos in Lisbon, while her debut as an actor was in the city of Beja as part of a company organized by her cousin, the actor António Augusto Xavier de Macedo. Soon making a name for herself, she returned to Lisbon, where she made her acting debut in the capital in November 1845 in a primitive circus shed that was the forerunner of the Teatro do Ginásio. Later, she became part of the Teatro do Ginásio company and took part in the official opening of that theatre on 16 May 1846, under the direction of the French director, Emílio Doux in a cast including the famous Portuguese actor, Actor Taborda. Soon after the opening the theatre was forced to close because of the so-called Revolution of Maria da Fonte, which were revolts against the prevailing government. Cândida then went on tour to the provinces. She returned to the Ginásio after it reopened in November 1852, following modernization.

== Career ==
Emília Cândida's career in the Ginásio was long and acclaimed, playing opposite actors such as Taborda, Amélia Vieira, Eugênia Câmara, Emília das Neves, Adelina Abranches and João Anastácio Rosa. In addition to performing in comedies at the Ginásio, Cândida also took part in what were known in Portugal as "magazine" shows or revues, performing in the first such show in Lisbon, at the Ginásio, in 1851. Around 1855 she moved to the D. Maria II National Theatre, where she stayed for most of the rest of her career, playing major roles as part of the Rosas & Brazão and C. Santos & Pinto theatre companies, among others. In 1880 she formed the Society of Dramatic Artists theatre company, together with Augusto Rosa, João Anastácio Rosa, Eduardo Brazão, Rosa Damasceno, Virgínia Dias da Silva and Joaquim de Almeida. After successive successes in Portugal, she went with part of the cast to Brazil in 1886.

Emília Cândida left the theatre at the beginning of the 20th century. She was becoming blind and ill and, like many actors of the time, was poor as she had no pension. On 2 May 1906, she said goodbye at a benefit and tribute night at the D. Maria II. She died on 11 February 1908. She had never married but did have one child. She is buried at the Prazeres Cemetery in Lisbon.
