= Carlota Talassi =

Portuguese stage actress

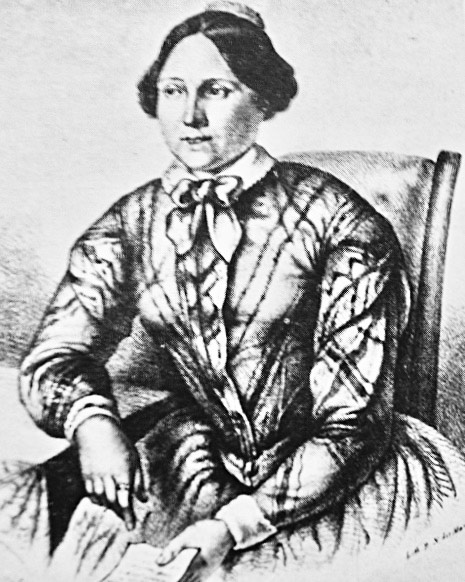
- Born: Carlota Talassi da Silva; 20 September 1811; Porto, Portugal
- Died: 4 September 1891 Aged 79; Lisbon, Portugal
- Resting place: Prazeres Cemetery, Lisbon
- Occupation(s): Actress and translator
- Known for: Portuguese theatre
- Partner: Caetano José da Silva

Carlota Talassi (1811 – 1891) was a Portuguese actress and translator of plays.

== Early life ==
Carlota Talassi da Silva was born in the parish of Santo Ildefonso in Porto, Portugal on 20 September 1811. She was the daughter of an actress, Catarina Talassi, and granddaughter of an Italian poet, Augusto Talassi, who moved to Portugal in the service of Queen Maria I. There is no record of the name of her father, although it is believed he was also an actor. Her parents supported their daughter's inclinations to join them in the theatre and guided her development from an early age. She was 9 years old when she first stepped onto the stage at the São João National Theatre in Porto, on 13 May 1821, on the birthday of King João VI.

== Career ==
In the same year as her first appearance, Talassi appeared in several other plays in Porto, to great acclaim. In 1822 she went to the Portuguese capital, Lisbon, with her parents but they were unable to get work at the Teatro da Rua dos Condes and, as a result, travelled around the provinces of Portugal and Galicia in Spain and returned to Porto, where they lived for another three years. In October 1825, they headed back to Lisbon and entered the Teatro do Salitre, where Talassi remained until Easter 1826 when the death of the king led to political instability and the closing of the theatres. After D. Pedro defeated his brother, D. Miguel in the Liberal Wars and entered Lisbon in 1833, she returned to the Salitre in the capacity of first lady. She also began to translate plays from French into Portuguese.

Émile Doux was a French actor who visited Portugal as part of a theatrical company and stayed in Lisbon, forming his own company, after having been asked by the playwright, Almeida Garrett, to teach some of the Lisbon actors. Talassi was one of the students and then joined his company at the Teatro da Rua dos Condes. She starred in a performance of Um Auto de Gil Vicente written by Garrett when it was performed in 1838 to honour Queen Maria II on her birthday. In the same year, she also performed in plays by Alexandre Dumas and Victor Hugo. Later, Talassi moved to a company owned by the very rich Count of Farrobo. In December 1843, she married Caetano José da Silva, who came from a theatrical family. In 1844, she was part of a Society of Actors who organised to perform at the Rua dos Condes, including the actors pt: Sargedas and pt: Epifânio Aniceto Gonçalves, who was the director. However, that theatre closed in 1846 and Talassi was then chosen as first lady for the company of the rebuilt D. Maria II National Theatre in Lisbon, which re-opened in 1846. At around the same time, Portugal began to classify actors and assign them categories according to their artistic merit. The government consulted a committee, which heard the opinion of leading actors. Talassi was classified as "Absolute First Lady" prior to moving to the D. Maria II.

== Death ==
Talassi stayed at the D. Maria II National Theatre until she retired from acting in 1862, obtaining a pension that reflected her high status in the acting world. She died from heart problems on 4 September 1891 at her home in Campo Grande in Lisbon. She was buried in the Prazeres Cemetery in Lisbon.
