= Actor Taborda =

Portuguese stage actor

Francisco Alves da Silva Taborda
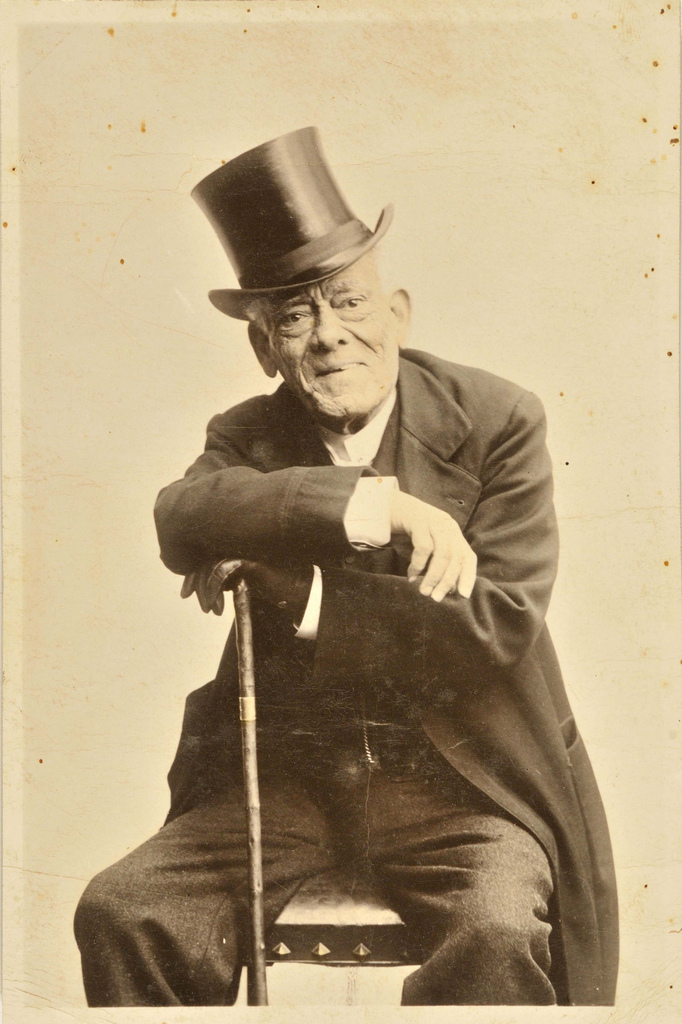
- Taborda in later life
- Born: 8 January 1824; Abrantes, Portugal
- Died: 5 March 1909 Aged 85; Lisbon
- Resting place: Prazeres Cemetery, Lisbon
- Other names: Actor Taborda
- Occupation: Comedy actor
- Years active: 37
- Known for: Lisbon theatre
- Spouse: Maria Isabel da Encarnação
- Children: One daughter
- Parent(s): Francisco Alves da Silva Taborda and Maria do Carmo Rola
- Awards: Commander of the Military Order of Saint James of the Sword

Francisco Alves da Silva Taborda, better known as Actor Taborda ComSE (8 January 1824 – 5 March 1909), was the leading male comedy actor in Portugal in the 19th century.

== Early life ==
Taborda was born on 8 January 1824, in the parish of São João Baptista, in Abrantes in the Santarém District of Portugal. He was the son of Francisco Alves da Silva Taborda and Maria do Carmo Rola. At the age of nine he moved to the Portuguese capital of Lisbon, where he was cared for by his grandfather who placed him as an apprentice typographer with a printing house. A rapid learner, he soon obtained a better-paid job with another printing house, owned by João José da Mota, which made posters for theatres. In addition, Mota owned a performance space (known as a shed) where circuses were performed. It was there that Taborda made contact with numerous actors performing in Lisbon.

== Acting career ==
Taborda made his debut as an amateur actor at the small Teatro Timbre, situated on Rua do Arco a São Mamede in Lisbon. The positive reception he received motivated both Mota and Manuel Machado, who was a supervisor at the Teatro Nacional de São Carlos, to adapt the shed to a theatre, inaugurating it on 16 May 1846 as the Teatro do Ginásio. Taborda was a member of the cast for the first performance. However, the political and social instability of the time, which culminated in the Maria da Fonte Revolution of 1846, harmed all Lisbon's theatres and Taborda temporarily moved away from the stage. Recognized for his talent, however, he was sent by King Fernando II to train in Paris.

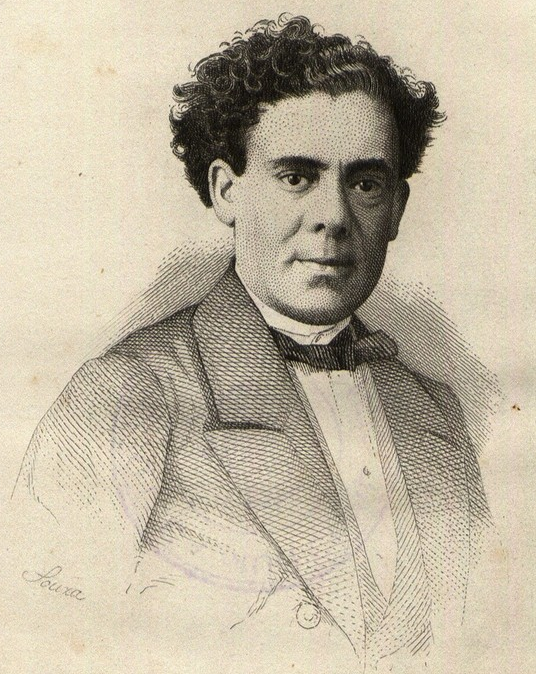
Engraving of Taborda from 1861

In 1849, Taborda married Maria Isabel da Encarnação. They were to be married for 59 years, having one daughter. With the reopening of the Ginásio, Taborda achieved great success. Faithful to that theatre, he rejected invitations to perform in more prestigious locations. In a short time he became an idol, playing comic characters, especially in plays by Molière. In 1861, he began touring throughout the country. It was not until 1863 that he agreed to act at the prestigious D. Maria II National Theatre, where he did one season. Later, he did two seasons at the Teatro da Trindade. In 1870, the Taborda Society was created. This was a theatrical society that paid tribute to the actor and of which numerous actors and theatre lovers were members. In the same year, the Teatro Taborda was inaugurated in Lisbon, also in his honour, built on land belonging to a defunct Jesuit college. The opening show included poetry recitals, drama and comedy. In 1871, Taborda toured Brazil for 3 months to considerable success.

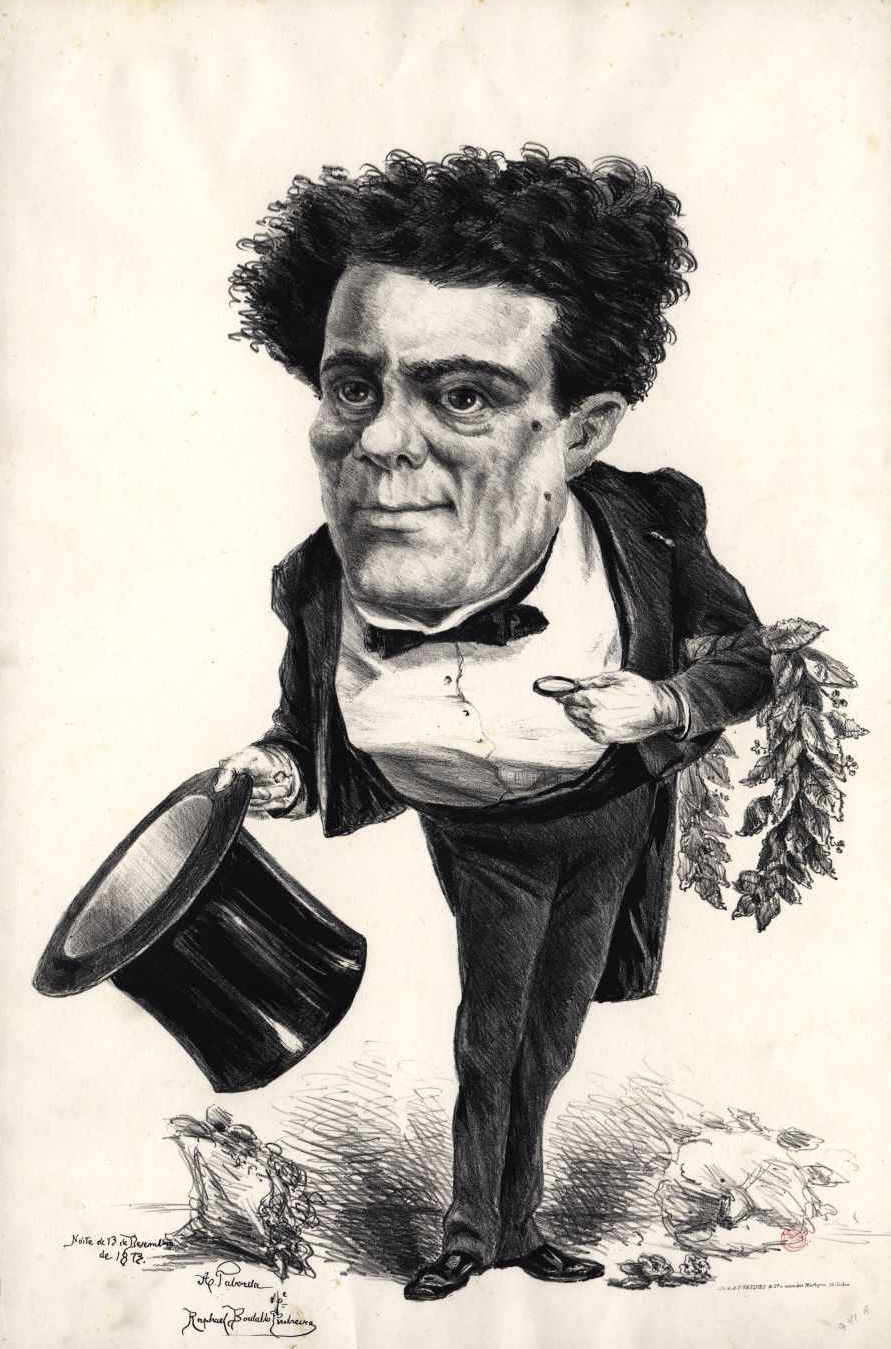
Caricature of Taborda by Rafael Bordalo Pinheiro

In 1879, Taborda began to have the first symptoms of deafness. One of his greatest successes was achieved in 1881, in the comedy A Voz do Sangue (The Voice of the Blood), which he performed more than 70 times consecutively, a considerable run for Lisbon theatres of the time. In 1883, King D. Luís I granted him an honourable retirement, with a pension, having already made him a Commander of the Military Order of Saint James of the Sword.

== Retirement and death ==
In the last year of his life, due to his poor health, Taborda rarely left his modest home, on the second floor of 76, Rua do Diário de Notícias, in the parish of Encarnação (Lisbon), where he lived with his wife. He died on 5 March 1909. On the same day, the Teatro Ginásio closed its doors to the public as a sign of mourning. The funeral, which took place at 3:00 pm the following day, featured numerous tributes, extensive wreaths, dedications from several friends and theatre companies and associations as well as the participation of King Manuel II and Queen D. Amélia. He was buried in the family vault he had built, in Lisbons Prazeres Cemetery.

In 1912, a statue was erected in his honour, in a park in his home town of Abrantes, in front of another theatre named after him. In 1914, two identical busts of Taborda were erected, one in Lisbon's Estrela Gardens and another inside the Teatro Nacional D. Maria II. His name is part of the toponymy of Abrantes, Almada, Amadora, Lisbon, Odivelas and Oeiras.
