= Santa Justa, Lisbon =

Santa Justa
- Civil parish
- Location in Portugal
- Coordinates: 38.716°N 9.136°W
- Country: Portugal
- Region: Lisbon
- Metropolitan area: Lisbon
- District: Lisbon
- Municipality: Lisbon
- Disbanded: 2012

Area
  - Total: 0.24 km^{2} (0.09 sq mi)

Population (2001)
  - Total: 700
  - Density: 2,900/km^{2} (7,600/sq mi)
- Time zone: UTC+00:00 (WET)
  - Summer (DST): UTC+01:00 (WEST)

Santa Justa (Portuguese pronunciation: [ˈsɐ̃tɐ ˈʒuʃtɐ]) (English: Saint Justa) is a former civil parish (freguesia) in the city and municipality of Lisbon, Portugal. It has a population of 700 inhabitants and a total area of 0.24 km². At the administrative reorganization of Lisbon on 8 December 2012 it became part of the parish Santa Maria Maior.
