= João Anastácio Rosa =

Portuguese actor and sculptor

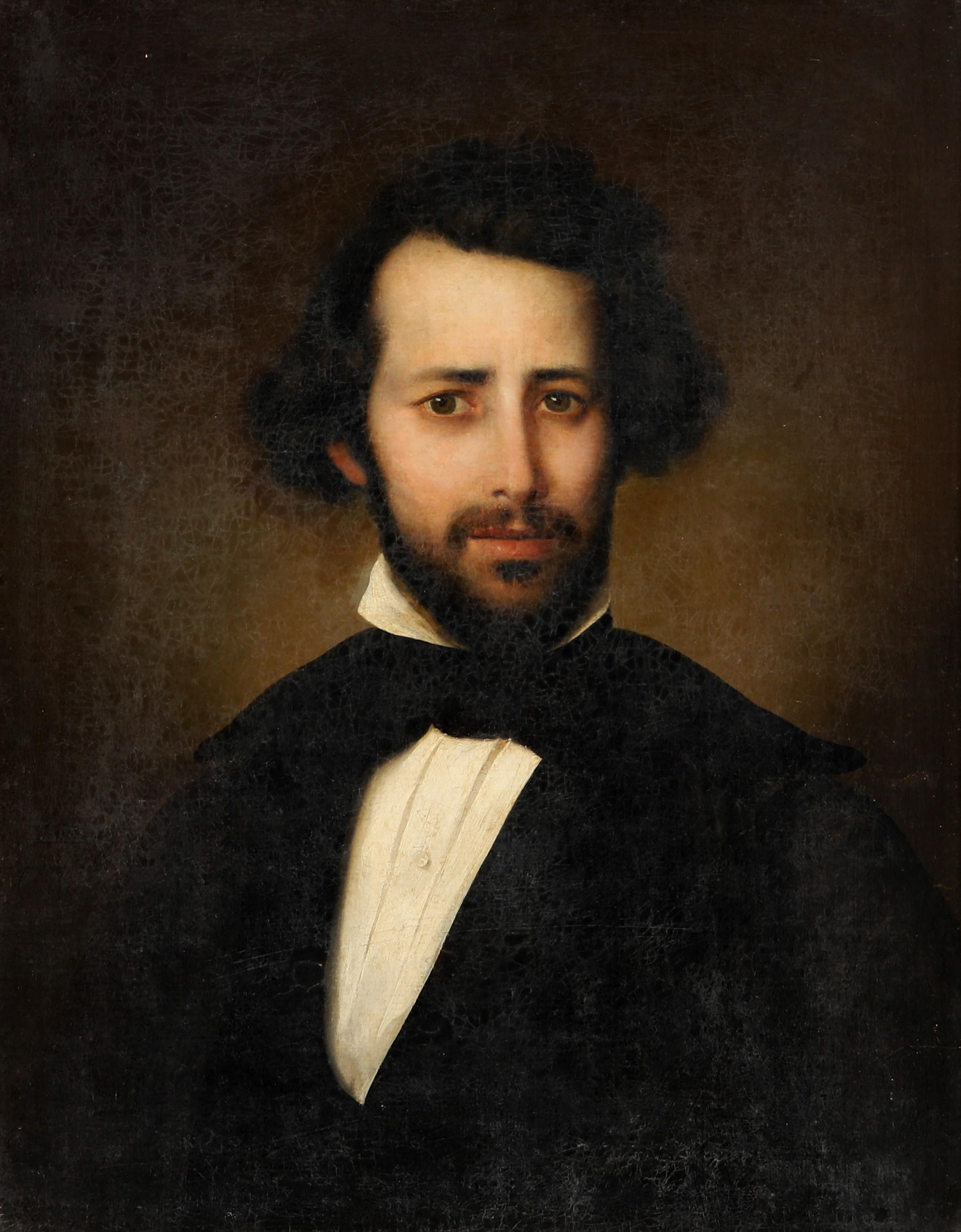
- Born: 1812; Redondo, Portugal
- Died: December 17, 1884; Lisbon, Portugal
- Occupations: Actor, sculptor

João Anastácio Rosa (1812– December 17, 1884) was a Portuguese actor and sculptor.

== Works ==
- bust of Almeida Garrett
- cartoon, Rafael Bordalo Pinheiro (1846-1905), in the National Library of Portugal
- portrait of Francisco Cardeal Patriarcha in the National Library of Portugal
