= Teatro do Salitre =

Former theatre in Lisbon, Portugal

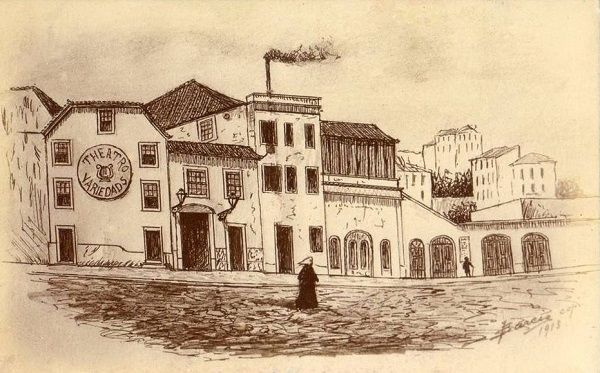
- Address: Lisbon; Portugal
- Capacity: 900

Construction
- Opened: 27 November 1782
- Closed: 1879
- Architect: Simão Caetano Nunes

Teatro do Salitre was one of the first theatres in Lisbon, capital of Portugal. It opened on 27 November 1782, changed its name to Teatro de Variedades in 1858, and was demolished in 1879. For much of its existence it was one of the two leading theatres in Lisbon, together with the Teatro da Rua dos Condes. Lisbon also had the Teatro Nacional de São Carlos, which was mainly dedicated to opera. The Salitre was situated close to the area that later became Lisbon's theatre district, known as Parque Mayer.

== History ==
Teatro do Salitre was built on the initiative of a businessman named João Gomes Varela, who commissioned the project from the architect Simão Caetano Nunes. The theatre could accommodate an audience of around 900. The debut show in November 1782 included the participation of a famous tightrope walker. Later, the theatre was managed by the actor, António José de Paula, who from 1792 introduced an innovative repertoire that included two plays adapted from the work of Voltaire. Under Paula, the Salitre became the only Portuguese theatre where comics performed. After being closed by the authorities in September 1792, allegedly for having poor conditions, a licence to reopen was granted in November of that same year. The season that followed led to an altercation between Paula and the impresario of the Teatro de São Carlos, who intended to present the same play as Paula, but with a different translation. Paula won out and presented and played in his translation of Frederick II, King of Prussia by Luciano Comella, with great success. Another reason for the success of the Salitre at this time, was that it presented performances with female artists, which was very popular with the public. Paula was followed by other impresarios, including Émile Doux, a French citizen who had arrived in Lisbon with a French theatre group and had decided to stay.

By 1840 the Teatro do Salitre was in a phase of decay. The Portuguese writer and playwright, later to become president, Teófilo Braga, in a study entitled Garrett and the Romantic Drama (1905), transcribes an article in which it is said that the Salitre was only frequented by the "lowest class of society". A newspaper article of 1871 attributed its success to recognising that its audience was happier if "everything is translated into prose". According to Ana Isabel de Vasconcelos, it had always been the poor relation of the Rua dos Condes and at the end of the 18th century, when there was a shortage of actors, the Salitre struggled to compete.

In 1836, the famous poet, writer and politician, Almeida Garrett was appointed as Inspector-General of the National Theatres and Shows. Part of his responsibility was to decide on the allocation of state subsidies to theatres in Lisbon. To qualify, the Salitre and Rua dos Condes had to put on six shows a year written by Portuguese playwrights and open their facilities to inspection by Garrett. This led to controversy between the two theatres, with the poet and writer Alexandre Herculano writing to Garrett on behalf of the Salitre to complain that the Rua dos Condes had no interest in promoting national playwrights and arguing that the Salitre should receive all of the subsidy. In 1838, two newspapers briefly surfaced in Lisbon. O Desenjoativo Teatral: Jornal Recreativo e Moral, which supported the Salitre, and Atalaia Nacional dos Teatros, which supported the Rua dos Condes. There was considerable antagonism between the two papers and neither lasted for more than a few issues, both closing in the same year they were founded.

== Demolition ==
The Teatro do Salitre was demolished in 1879 at the time of the construction of the Avenida da Liberdade a wide avenue leading out of the centre of Lisbon in a northwest direction, that was designed to emulate the boulevards of Paris.

== See also ==
- List of theatres and auditoriums in Lisbon
