= Delphina =

Portuguese stage actor

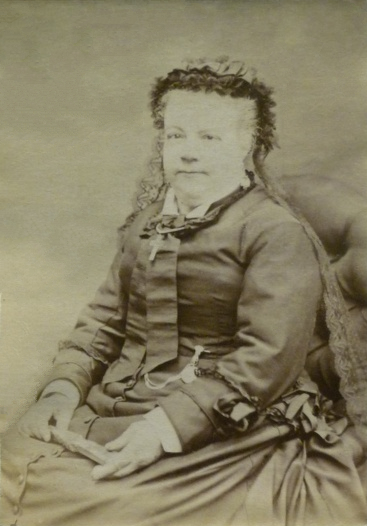
- Delphina, photograph by Alfred Fillon
- Born: Delphina Perpetua do Espirito Santo; 20 April 1818; Lisbon, Portugal
- Died: 22 September 1881 Aged 63; Lisbon
- Occupation: actor
- Years active: 40
- Known for: Lisbon theatre

Delfina Perpétua do Espírito Santo (Note: Also rendered as Delphina Perpetua do Espirito Santo, as it was usually spelt before the spelling reforms of the 20th century.) (20 April 1818 – 22 September 1881), known on the stage simply as Delphina, was a Portuguese actress who specialised in comedy roles.

== Early life ==
Delphina Perpetua do Espirito Santo was born in the Portuguese capital of Lisbon on 20 April 1818. Her parents were employed by the Teatro Nacional de São Carlos in Lisbon but apparently rejected their illegitimate daughter. She was given her name by the lady who raised her, also an employee of the theatre. As a young child she became very popular at the theatre and at the age of 7 or 8 was chosen to play Cupid in a performance, partly on the strength of her beautiful blond hair. Later, the rich owner of the theatre, the Count of Farrobo gave her a small role in the comedy, Woman, Husband and Lover, performed at the Thalia Theatre on his Laranjeiras estate on the outskirts of Lisbon. The positive reception of her performance encouraged her to seek a theatrical career and in 1841 she started to perform at the Teatro do Salitre in Lisbon, beginning to establish herself as one of the funniest actresses in Lisbon. She first performed in Peão Fidalgo, a translation and adaptation of Molière's Le Bourgeois gentilhomme.

== Career ==
In 1843, Delphina moved to the Teatro da Rua dos Condes as a result of the recommendation of the poet and playwright Almeida Garrett. She stayed there until 1846 when she moved to the D. Maria II National Theatre, where she was classified as "First Comic Actress". Staying in the same theatre, in 1853 she joined a new theatre company of Francisco Palha and played the starring roles in its performances. She followed Palha when he took his company to the Teatro Rua dos Condes while waiting for the new Teatro da Trindade, which Palha had financed, to be completed. The first performance at the Trindade was in November 1867, and Delphina was part of the permanent cast. She continued to star even after Palha introduced a new form of theatre for Lisbon, known as Burlesque Opera, which she adapted to with considerable acclaim. She stayed at the Trindade until, already very ill, she decided to retire, giving her final performance on 1 July 1880. However, she evidently had a change of heart as she returned for three days in September of the same year, but from her performances it was clear that she had memory problems.

Delphina Perpetua do Espirito Santo died on 22 September 1881. Prior to her death she had given away most of her money to charities. Her funeral attracted large crowds.
