= Teatro da Rua dos Condes =

Former theatre in Lisbon, Portugal

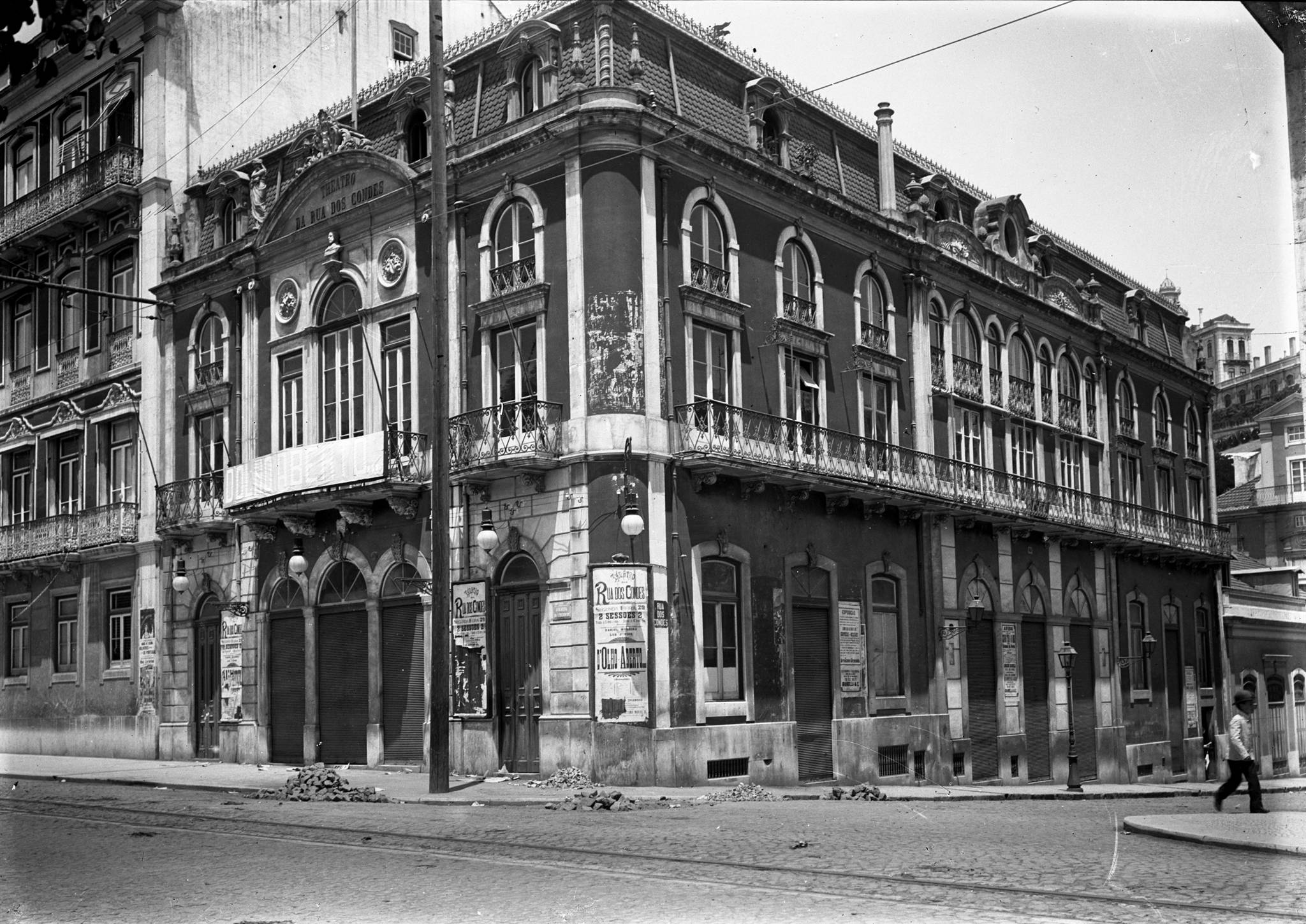
- The theatre after reconstruction in 1888
- Interactive map of Teatro da Rua dos Condes
- Address: Rua dos Condes (now Rua Condes); Lisbon; Portugal
- Coordinates: 38°43′00.1″N 09°08′30.5″W

Construction
- Opened: 4 February 1738
- Closed: 1915 (converted to cinema); demolished 1951

The Teatro da Rua dos Condes, (Note: Alternatively rendered as Theatro da Rua dos Condes, the standard spelling before the 1911 spelling reform.) or simply Condes, was a theatre in the Portuguese capital of Lisbon. It was opened in 1738 and rebuilt in 1755 after an earthquake. Never considered comfortable, it was demolished and rebuilt in 1888 and eventually converted to a cinema. After a further demolition and reconstruction as a purpose-built cinema, the building now houses a Hard Rock Café. For part of its life the Teatro da Rua dos Condes was one of Lisbon's major theatres, attracting the city's elite, including the royal family. However, with the construction of newer, more modern theatres it gradually moved from offering operas and legitimate theater to vaudeville and revues with more of a mass appeal.

== Early days ==
The Teatro da Rua dos Condes is believed to have been first opened on 4 February 1738 on land owned in Lisbon by the Count of Ericeira. Prior to that the location may have been used as a private theatre, probably outdoors, for the Count. It was situated on the Rua dos Condes, now known as Rua Condes, so named because several counts had their palaces in the locality. The theatre, occupying an area of 59 metres by 24 metres, began as an opera house. Under the direction of the businessman, Agostinho da Silva, it rapidly attracted opera companies from Italy, with works by Pietro Metastasio and Apostolo Zeno proving very popular with the Portuguese aristocracy and foreign diplomats. Due to the illness and eventual death of King John V, theatrical performances were suspended for about 8 years, between 1743 and 1750. In 1755 a Spanish company also performed there.

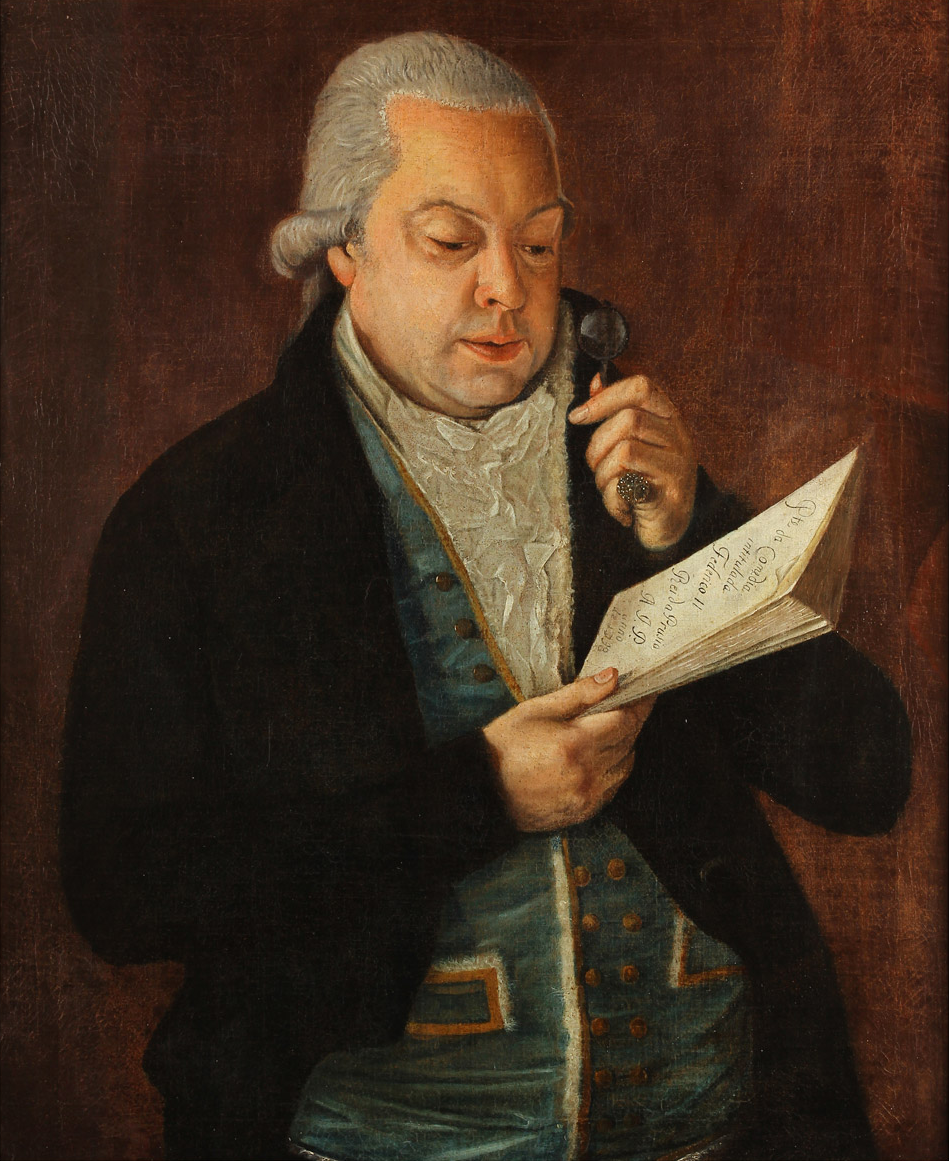
António José de Paula was responsible for restoring the theatre building in 1803

== After the earthquake ==
The 1755 Lisbon earthquake on November 1 of that year, which destroyed much of Lisbon, certainly shook the Teatro da Rua dos Condes, but it may not have been completely destroyed because, by 1759, it had already re-opened and, under Agostinho da Silva, was again the main theatre for Italian opera, remaining as such until the opening of the Teatro Nacional de São Carlos in 1793.

However, the high cost of presenting opera meant that the performances were intermittent and the Condes was also a venue for shows with more of a mass appeal, such as comedies. After the 1774 dismissal of the primadonna Annina Zamperini by Sebastião José de Carvalho e Melo, 1st Marquis of Pombal, women were banned from performing on stage in Portugal, a ban which was enforced in the capital of Lisbon until Mariana Albani, Luisa Gerbini and Joaquina Lapinha were engaged at the Teatro Nacional de São Carlos in 1795, and the actors were therefore exclusively male for those twenty years. Over the years the theatre was forced to appeal to the government for financial support. Obtaining such support often required it to align with the prevailing political ideology, which was the case during the early decades of the 19th century and particularly during the Portuguese Civil War (1828–34). The two directors of the theatre between 1799 and 1834, António José de Paula and his son, Manuel Batista de Paula, were very successful. The former restored the theatre building in 1803 after years of bad management, while his son remained in charge for three decades during the period of great political instability.

In February 1812, for the sake of economic viability, the managements of the Teatro São Carlos and the Condes were joined. However, this only lasted until July 1818, since the arrangement was not considered advantageous for the Condes.

== Lack of comfort ==
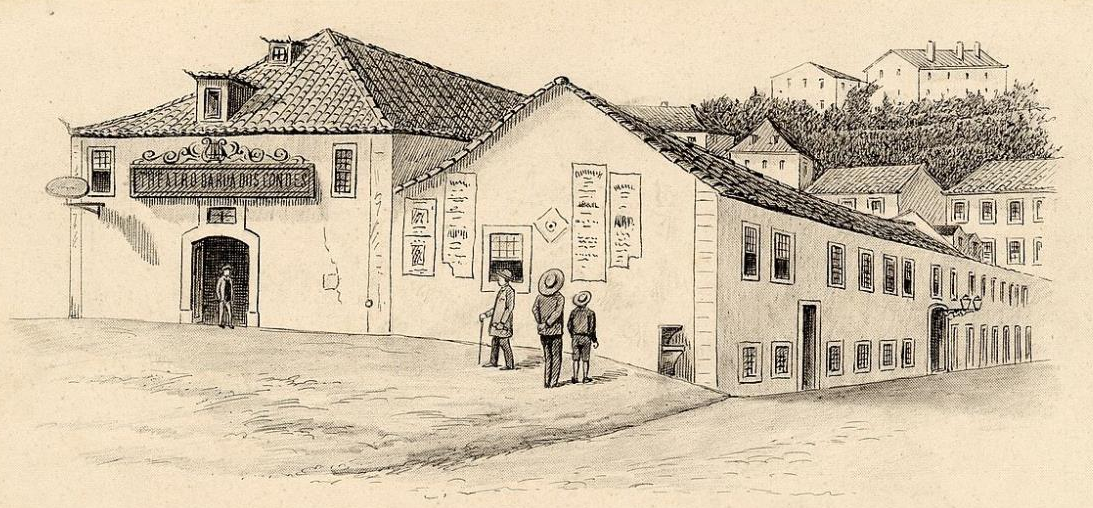
Teatro da Rua dos Condes as it looked during most of the 19th century

The Teatro da Rua dos Condes had 23 boxes on each of four floors, five opposite the stage and nine on each side. The British traveller, William Beckford, described it in 1787 as being "low and narrow, the stage a small gallery" and "quite poor". The Portuguese writer, Camilo Castelo Branco, also provided a negative description, describing it as an extremely uncomfortable theatre, partly due to the great temperature variations experienced in different parts of the room, noting "In the middle of the audience, the unfortunate spectator who finds there a place burns with fire; on the sides of the same audience there is a wind that has run through the corridors, which torments all the miserable people who occupy these seats". The building also lacked a foyer.

In 1837, José Agostinho de Macedo wrote about the "tattered cloth", the "cobwebs" and "the dense and smelly steam of tallow and fish oil from the lamps". Towards the end of its life it was described by Almeida Lopes as a "miserable shack, stingy and ruined, armed in a skeleton of rotten beams, covered with painted canvas and golden paper, already outdated for the hygiene and comfort needs of the time".

== Nineteenth century ==
The victory of the Liberals in the Civil War resulted in considerable support for Lisbon's theatres. The Condes was once again preferred as a national theatre, which staged new Portuguese plays and foreign works that were new to Portugal. The historical drama by Almeida Garrett, Um Auto de Gil Vicente, first performed on 15 August 1838, stands out as it was to encourage a revitalization of Portuguese national drama, being considered the first example of romanticism on the Portuguese stage. A particularly important role was played by Émile Doux, who arrived in Portugal at the end of the Civil War in 1835 with a French theatre company and stayed after it returned to France, taking charge of a new Portuguese theatre company promoted by Garrett, which included the actors Delphina, João Anastácio Rosa, Carlota Talassi and Emília das Neves. In 1840, management passed into the hands of the very rich Count of Farrobo, whose three-year period of ownership is remembered for the dubious choice of repertoire and for financial extravagances.

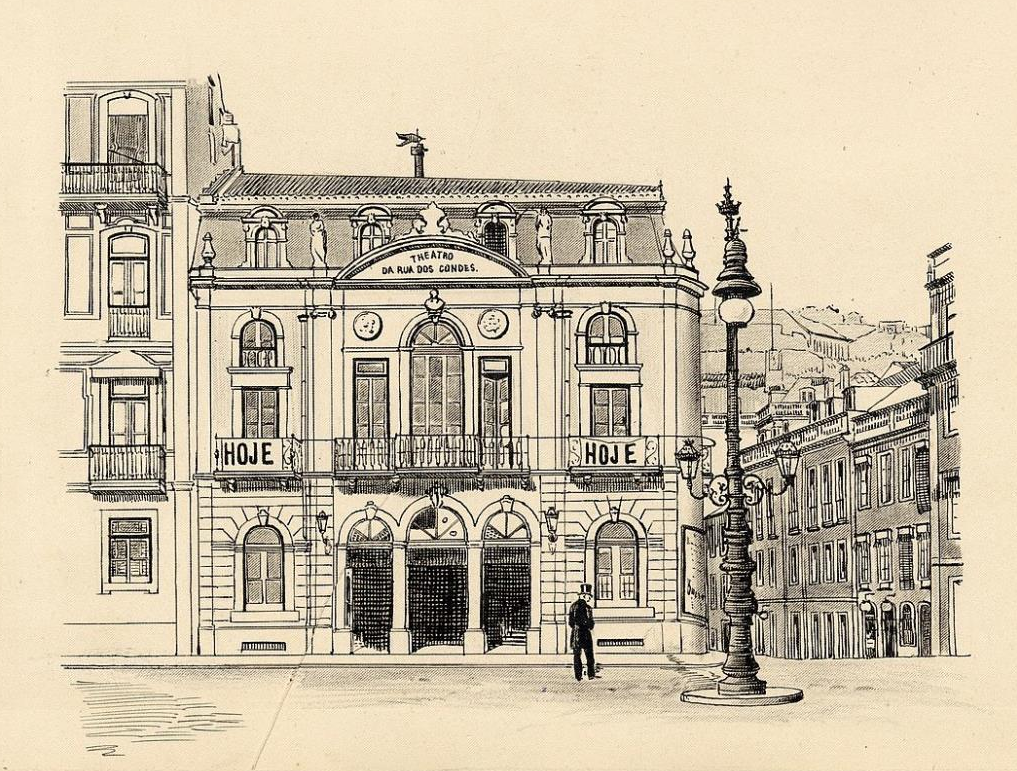
The main façade of the new Teatro da Rua dos Condes

However, the Teatro da Rua dos Condes remained dominant until the opening of the nearby D. Maria II National Theatre in 1846, which persuaded many of the actors at the Condes to join its new theatre company. After this the Condes was closed between 1846 and 1852 while land disputes were resolved and renovation was carried out. Between 1852 and 1888, during which time the theatre had several owners, the repertoire attracted a poorer, although enthusiastic, audience. Following a report by a commission set up to review the safety of theatres in Lisbon, the building was demolished for safety reasons in 1882, with its last performance being on 20 May 1882. In fact, the report may have had an ulterior motive as land was required, and expropriated, for the construction of Lisbon's new Avenida da Liberdade, a large street leading out of the centre of the city in a northwest direction. A temporary theatre, known as the Theatre-Chalet, occupied part of the land from 1883 to 1888, but was then demolished to make way for the New Theatre (Teatro Novo da Rua dos Condes), funded by Francisco de Almeida Grandela, a merchant who owned large department stores.

The first impresarios to use the new theatre were Salvador Marques and Casimiro de Almeida. Together they set up a company that was directed by António de Sousa Bastos, which opened the new theatre on 23 December 1888. The company's two presentations were not very well received, in contrast to an opening monologue recited by the actor Actor Taborda in the early evening. The following shows were also not well received but a vaudeville by Sousa Bastos, Nitouche's Wedding, achieved considerable success, bringing strong box office revenues and an increase in popularity for the new theatre. In 1898 the building underwent internal remodelling works, increasing the capacity. Sousa Bastos wrote that the changes made the theatre less attractive.

== Conversion to cinema, and present role ==
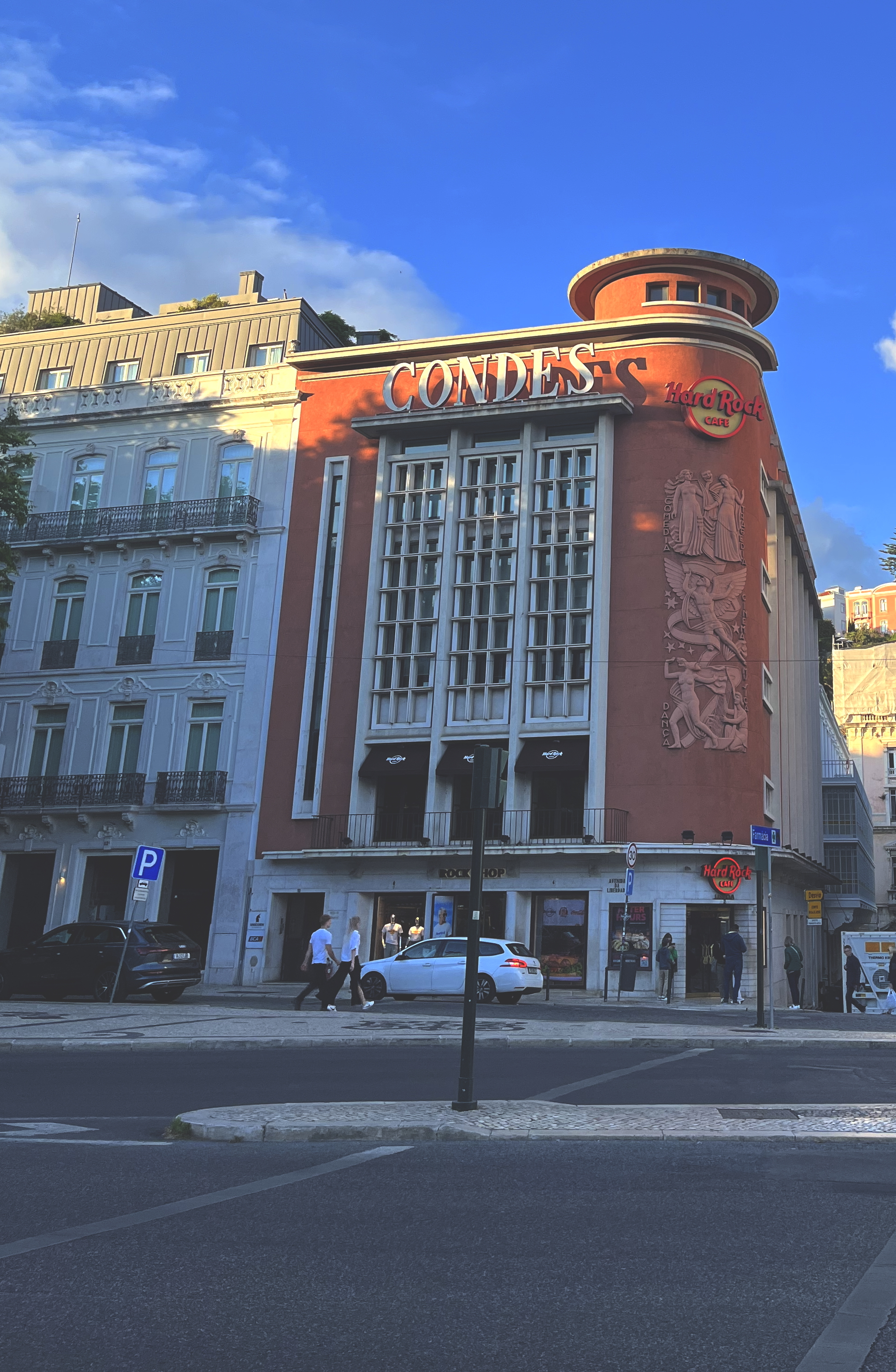
Hard Rock Cafe at Lisbon; view from across the street

In 1915 the building closed as a theatre and was converted to a cinema, being called the Cinema Olympia. Unsatisfactory box office receipts saw the original entrepreneur cease to operate within a few months, passing the theatre on to another, who renamed it Cinema Condes. With work to increase the capacity in 1919, the building remained as a cinema until 1951. It, in turn, was then demolished to make way for a purpose-built cinema, which functioned as such until 1997, when it was unable to compete with new cinemas in shopping centres. In 2003 it was converted to be the Lisbon Hard Rock Café.

== See also ==
- List of theatres and auditoriums in Lisbon
