= Teatro do Ginásio =

Former theatre in Lisbon, Portugal

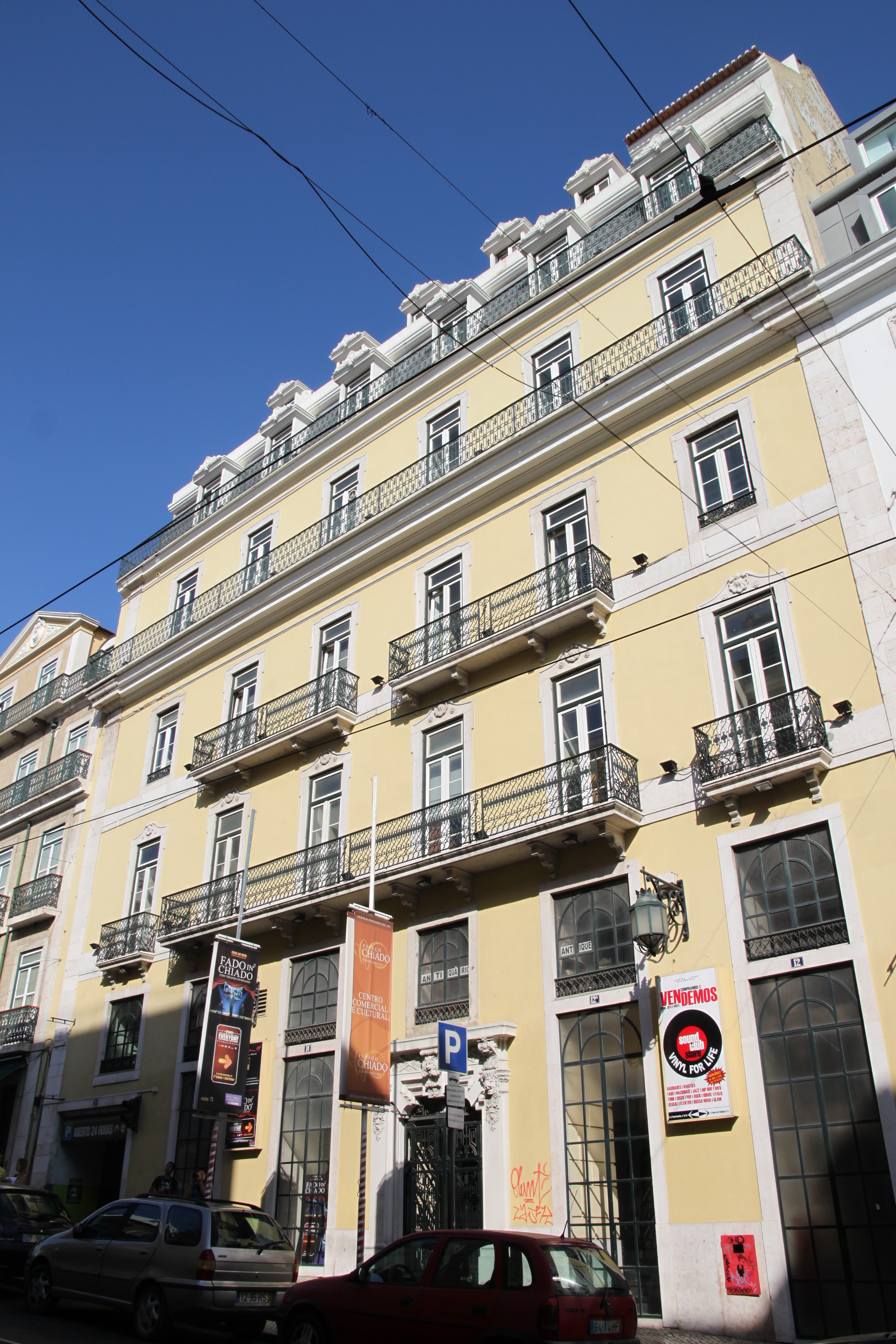
- Current facade of the former theatre
- Interactive map of Teatro do Ginásio
- Address: Rua Nova da Trindade 5 Lisbon; Portugal
- Coordinates: 38°42′41″N 09°08′33″W

Construction
- Opened: 12 October 1845
- Closed: 1952

The Teatro do Ginásio (1845–1952) was a theatre in Lisbon, Portugal that mainly concentrated on performances of comedy shows.

== Construction ==
The Teatro do Ginásio was constructed on the modern-day Rua Nova da Trindade in the Chiado district of the Portuguese capital of Lisbon. It originally consisted of a simple shed, lacking in amenities, built in the grounds of the former Palace of Geraldes. The shed, owned by João Manuel da Mota, presented circuses and the first performance was given on 12 October 1845. A few months later some limited remodelling was carried out in order to permit the space to offer traditional theatre. It reopened on 16 May 1846.

== Early years ==
The Ginásio initially found it difficult to compete with the other three theatres in the Chiado District. Profitability was not helped by the Revolution of Maria da Fonte, a popular uprising in Portugal in 1846. As a result of these difficulties, the Ginásio was re-oriented towards presenting comedies, under the management of a Frenchman, Émile Doux, who directed the theatre in 1847 and 1848. In little more than a year, Doux presented five dramas, a melodrama, a farce and no less than 45 comedies, 26 of which were in one act. The emphasis on comedy led, over time, to the Ginásio becoming known as the "laugh factory". After 1848 its popularity enabled it to branch out into other forms of entertainment, such as comic operas and, beginning in 1851, what were known in Portugal as "magazine" shows, which were similar to revues.

== Rebuilding ==
The Ginásio became very popular, such that the Royal Family expressed a desire to attend one of its shows. However, the theatre was considered unsuitable to receive royalty. This, and the existing theatre's popularity amongst the general public, led the owners to think about demolishing the "“disgusting, dirty, tortuous shed, with steep stairs and narrow corridors" and construct a new theatre. In 1852, the theatre closed its doors for reconstruction for seven months. The interest in the new theatre was widespread, and the works were even visited by King Fernando II with two of his sons, who rented two boxes in the new theatre and had them decorated according to his specifications. The new theatre received favourable comments on its construction and the beauty of its decoration. While it succeeded in attracting larger audiences, the debts incurred for the remodelling, including further changes carried out in 1869, caused problems for successive management companies, leading them to depend on donations, particularly as the theatre was often without a show to put on. However, in 1878, José Joaquim Pinto took over and successfully ran the theatre until 1904, helped by a succession of new plays from Gervásio Lobato and Eduardo Schwalbach Lucci.

== Performers ==
Most of Portugal's best-known performers appeared there: Francisco Alves da Silva Taborda, considered the most popular performer in Portugal in the 19th century, performed in the first theatrical performance in 1846, as did Emília Cândida. José António do Vale performed there from the 1860s to 1880s. Isidoro Sabino Ferreira first performed at the Ginásio in 1855, Emília Adelaide in 1863 and Maria das Dores in 1869. Later the theatre attracted several other renowned actors and theatre companies including the company of Maria Matos and her husband Mendonça de Carvalho between 1916 and 1918, that of Lucinda Simões in 1919 and 1920, and the company of Alves da Cunha in 1920 and 1921.

== Fire ==
On 6 November 1921, a fire broke out in the theatre at dawn, leaving it in ruins. Owned at the time by the heirs of the singer Francisco D'Andrade, it did not reopen until 27 November 1925. Until the 1930s the theatre was occupied by the theatre company of Amélia Rey Colaço and her husband Robles Monteiro, with frequent performances by the actress Palmira Bastos. Later, foreign companies used the theatre. However, as the economy of Portugal declined and people became interested in seeing films as well as theatre, demand for performances at the Ginásio fell off. In 1932 it was converted to a theatre able to both stage plays and show films and by the 1940s it was primarily showing propaganda films from Nazi Germany, although Portugal remained neutral during World War II.

== Closure ==
The cinema-theatre closed in 1952. Classified as a Property of Public Interest by Lisbon City Council in 1980, the facade has been preserved but the interior was demolished and rebuilt.

== See also ==
- List of theatres and auditoriums in Lisbon
