= D. Maria II National Theatre =

Dramatic theatre in Lisbon, Portugal

Coordinates: 38.7148°N 9.1398°W

- Teatro Nacional D. Maria II
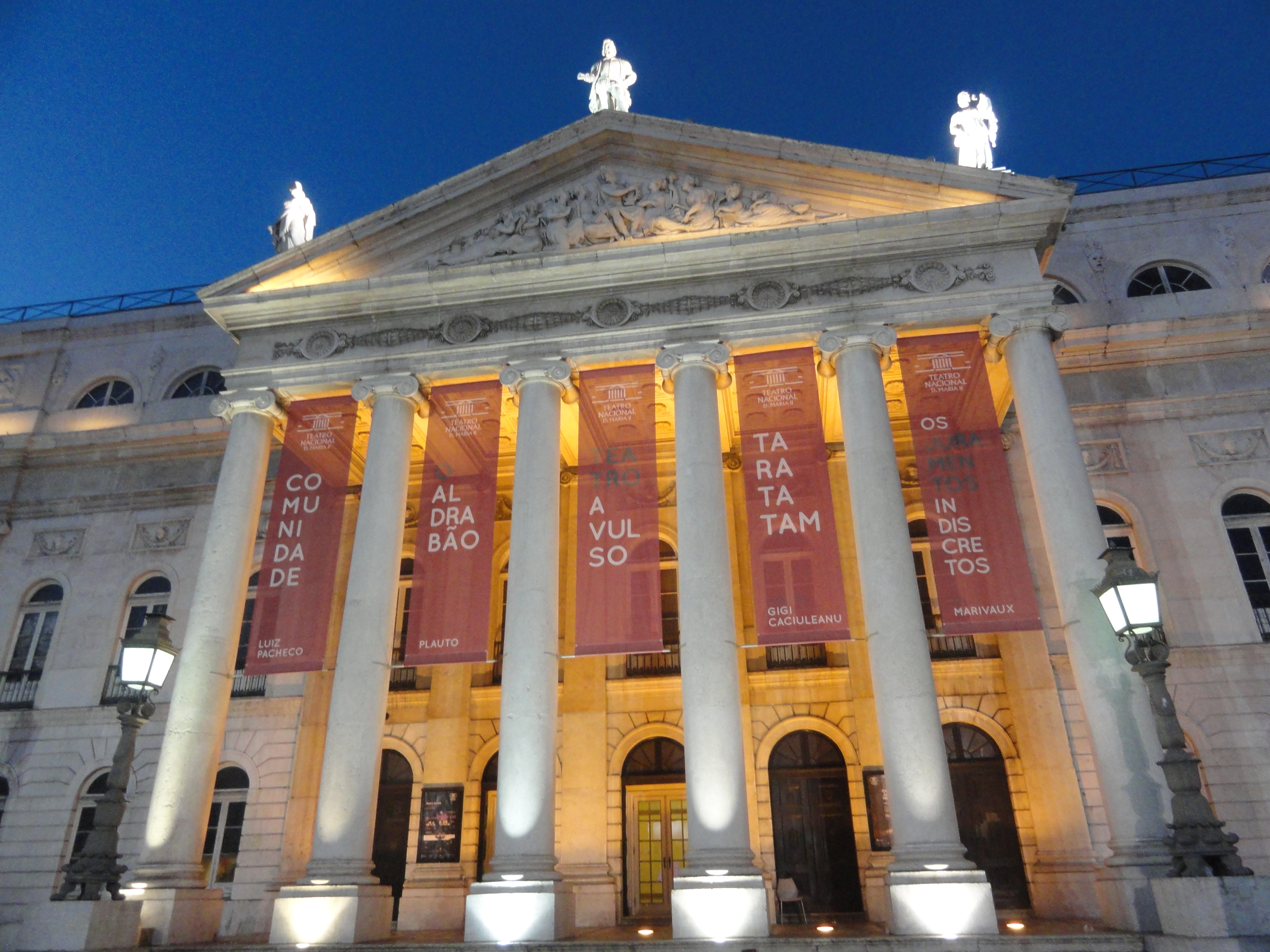
- Interactive map of D. Maria II National Theatre
- Address: Rossio Square; Lisbon; Portugal

Construction
- Built: 1842
- Architect: Fortunato Lodi

Website
- www.tndm.pt/en/

The Queen Maria II National Theatre (Portuguese: Teatro Nacional D. Maria II) is a theatre in Lisbon, Portugal. The historic theatre is one of the most prestigious Portuguese venues and is located in the Rossio square, in the centre of the city.

== History ==
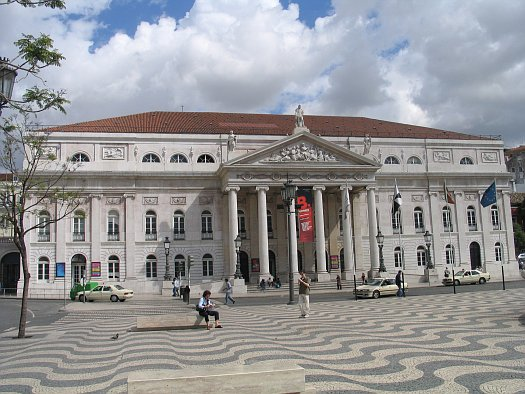
Main façade of the National Theatre D. Maria II.

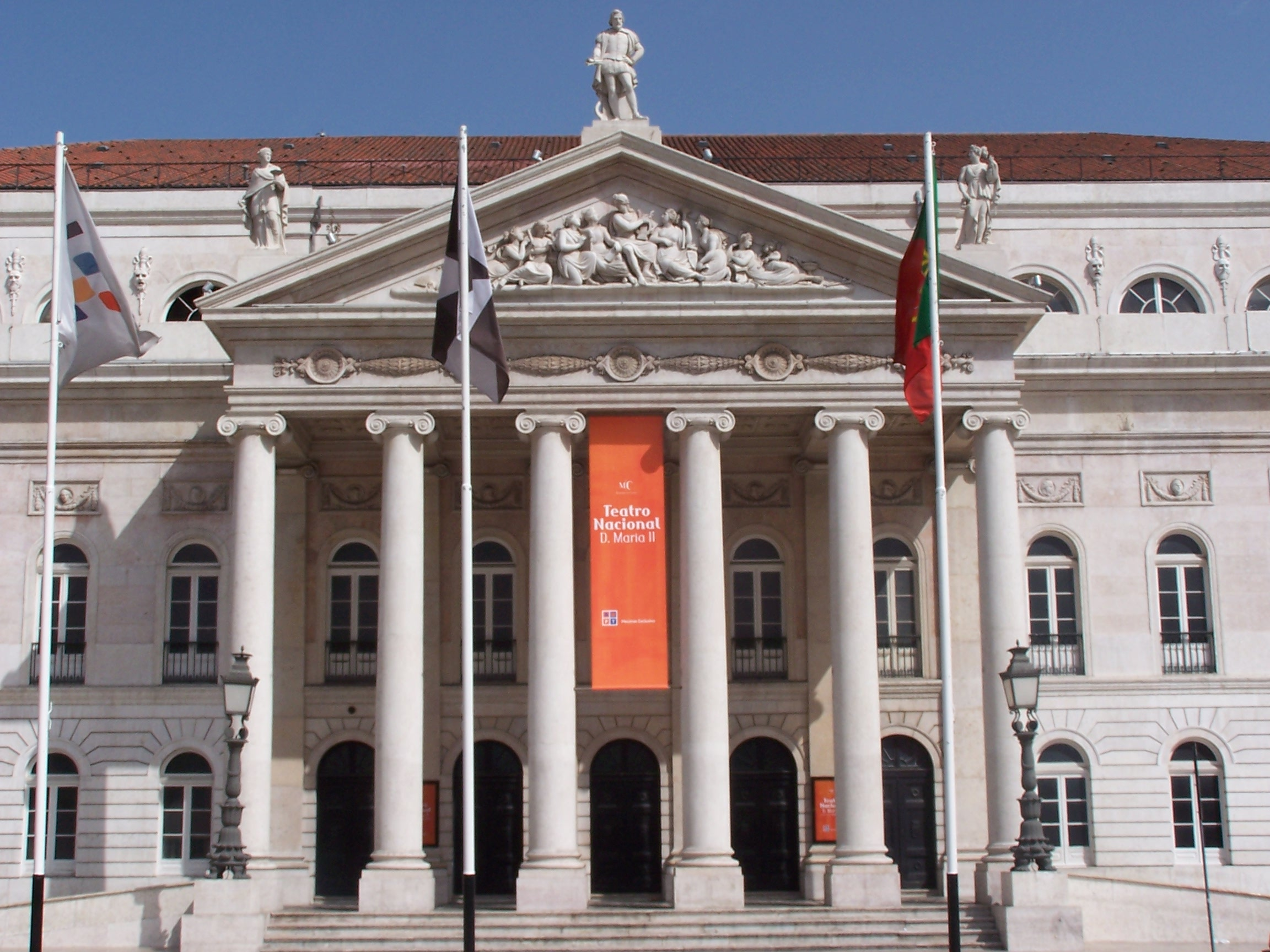
Portico of the National Theatre D. Maria II.

The theatre was built on the north side of Rossio square on the site of the old Estaus Palace, built around 1450 as a lodging for foreign dignitaries and noblemen visiting Lisbon. In the 16th century, when the Inquisition was installed in Portugal, the Estaus Palace became the seat of the Inquisition. The palace survived the 1755 Lisbon earthquake, but was destroyed by fire in 1836.

Thanks to the intensive efforts of Romantic poet and dramatist Almeida Garrett, it was decided to replace the old palace by a modern theatre, dedicated to Queen Mary II of Portugal. The building was constructed between 1842 and 1846 to a Neoclassical design by Italian architect Fortunato Lodi.

The Theatre building was as a Property of Public Interest in 1928, and has been reclassified as National Monument since 2003.

On the 2nd of December 1964, between 4am and 6am, a fire engulfed the building, leaving Amélia Rey Colaço's dressing room as the only unburnt part of the theater. The theater's archive and a painting of the queen D. Maria II were salvaged during the fire but Columbano Bordalo Pinheiro's works that decorated the theatre's ceilling were destroyed. Coincidentally, at the time, the play being shown was Macbeth which was then blamed for the fire.

== Architecture ==
The building is the best representative of Neoclassical architecture of Palladian influence in Lisbon. The main feature of the façade is a portico (hexastyle) with six Ionic columns reused from the Saint Francis Convent of Lisbon and a triangular pediment. The tympanum of the pediment is decorated with a sculpted relief showing Apollo and the Muses.

The pediment is topped by a statue of Renaissance playwright Gil Vicente (c. 1464-c. 1536), considered the founder of Portuguese theatre. Ironically, some of Gil Vicente's plays had been censured by the Portuguese Inquisition in the late 16th century.

The interior of the theatre was decorated by many important 19th-century Portuguese artists, but much of this decoration was lost in a fire in 1964. The theatre had to be completely renovated and was reinaugurated only in 1978.

== See also ==
- List of theatres and auditoriums in Lisbon
