= Elvira Velez =

Portuguese stage and cinema actress

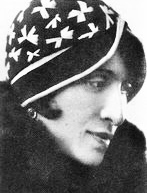
- Born: Elvira Sales Velez Pereira; 19 November 1892; Lisbon, Portugal
- Died: 8 April 1981, (aged 88); Lisbon, Portugal
- Occupation: Actress
- Years active: 50
- Known for: Lisbon theatre, Portuguese television, radio, and films
- Spouse: Henrique Pereira
- Children: Irene Velez, actress
- Awards: (1) Dame of the Military Order of Saint James of the Sword; (2) Lucinda Simões Award for Best Actress in Portugal in 1970

Elvira Sales Velez Pereira (1892 –1981), better known as Elvira Velez, was a Portuguese theatre, radio, television, and film actress.

== Early life ==
Velez was born in the parish of Santa Isabel in the Portuguese capital of Lisbon on 19 November 1892. She was taught to read by her father, mainly by reading the newspaper Diário de Notícias. From the age of 6 to 18 she lived in Torres Novas, 100km to the northeast of Lisbon, together with her father, stepmother and brothers, as her father was the manager of Teatro Virgínia in the town. Despite being discouraged by her father, she wanted to be an actress from an early age, being particularly inspired by the actors from the Teatro do Ginásio company from Lisbon, who frequently visited Torres Novas during their tours outside the capital. Her father forced her to take a primary school teacher course but when she was old enough to leave home, she moved to Tomar to join an amateur theatre group and then to Lisbon, where after many auditions, she finally managed to make her debut at the age of 21, at the Teatro Moderno in the operetta Os Grotescos (The Grotesques).

== Stage career ==
In 1914, she joined the Teatro São Luiz, being part of a cast including Ângela Pinto and Chaby Pinheiro. She would later perform at several other Lisbon theatres with stars such as Palmira Bastos, who she considered her first teacher, Adelina Abranches and her daughter Aura Abranches, Teresa Gomes, Lucília Simões, António Silva, Maria Matos, Vasco Santana, and Brunilde Júdice. In 1921, she worked with the Palmira Bastos Company at the Teatro Avenida, later joining Pinheiro in his recently founded Cremilda de Oliveira-Chaby Pinheiro company, at the Teatro Apolo in Lisbon. She toured Brazil in 1923 with the same company, after which she was hired by the Brazilian actor Leopoldo Fróes, staying in Brazil for more than two years. She remained popular on Portuguese stages until the mid-1970s, performing all theatrical genres. However, it was for comedy that she was best known.

== Cinema, radio, and television ==
Velez also left a considerable mark on Portuguese cinema. She made her debut in a 1938 film about clothes washers in Lisbon, Aldeia da Roupa Branca, and continued making films until 1960. She was a popular radio performer, becoming well known for her role as the "mother-in-law" in the 1952 serial Lélé e Zequinha, playing opposite her daughter Irene Velez and Vasco Santana. On television, she frequently appeared in plays that were part of the RTP Theatre Nights series.

== Awards and honours ==
Velez received the Lucinda Simões Award for Best Actress in 1970, for her role as Titi in the play A Relíquia (The Relic), based on the novel of the same name by Eça de Queiroz, which ran for several months at the Teatro Maria Matos in Lisbon, and which was considered to be a brilliant culmination of her career. She was also awarded the rank of Dame of the Military Order of Saint James of the Sword in 1971. On 2 September 1970, she was a guest on the RTP program Um Dia Com... (A Day with...), where she discussed the most important aspects of her career and personal life.

== Personal life ==
Velez was married to fellow actor Henrique Pereira. Irene Velez (1914 – 2004) was their only child. She married the actor, broadcaster, and politician, Igrejas Caeiro.

== Death ==
Velez died in Caxias, to the west of Lisbon, on 8 April 1981, at the age of 88. Six streets have been named after her in the area around Lisbon: in Almada, Cascais, Oeiras, Seixal, Sesimbra, and in Benfica, Lisbon.

== Films ==
The films in which Velez appeared were:

- Aldeia da Roupa Branca (White clothes village - 1938)
- Sorte Grande (Big Luck - 1938)
- Um Homem às Direitas (A Man on the Right - 1944)
- Três Dias Sem Deus (Three Days Without God - 1946)
- O Comissário de Polícia (The Police Commissioner - 1953)
- Duas Causas (Two Causes - 1953)
- Agora é Que São Elas (Now It's Them - 1954)
- O Primo Basílio (Cousin Basilio - 1959)
- As Pupilas do Senhor Reitor (Mr Rector's Pupils - 1960)
- Encontro com a Vida (Encounter with Life - 1960)
