= Emília de Oliveira =

Portuguese stage and film actor

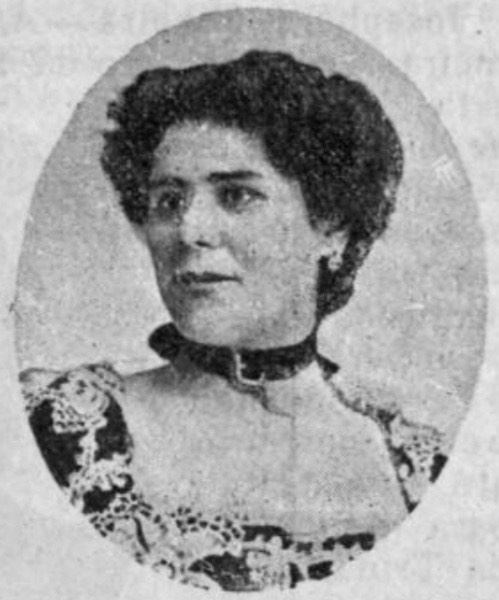
- Born: Emília de Oliveira; 25 November 1874; Lisbon, Portugal
- Died: 20 July 1968 Aged 93; Lisbon
- Resting place: Prazeres Cemetery, Lisbon
- Occupation: actor
- Years active: 50
- Known for: Lisbon theatre and Portuguese movies

Emília de Oliveira (1874–1968) was a Portuguese theatre and film actress.

== Early life ==
Emília de Oliveira was born on 25 November 1874, in the parish of Arroios in the Portuguese capital of Lisbon. She was the daughter of António and Maria Paula de Oliveira. Her first theatre performance was in December 1899, when she played alongside Adelina Abranches at the Teatro do Príncipe Real (later known as the Teatro Apolo) in Lisbon.

== Theatrical career ==
In 1901, Oliveira was part of a company organized by Eduardo Vitorino that went on tour to Brazil. During the tour she replaced the female lead, Georgina Pinto, who died. Returning from Brazil, she joined the cast of Taveira company in several musical shows, at the Teatro da Trindade. She then joined the Rosas & Brazão Company at the Teatro D. Amélia (later the Teatro da República and now the Teatro São Luiz), for whom she performed a range of plays. António de Sousa Bastos described her early career at several theatres as follows: "She was extraordinarily above all other artists, showing that she had a lot of value... She stood out alongside the first figures of the company... very elegant, dressed capriciously, speaking well, with a harmonious voice and with intelligence".

Oliveira performed at all the major theatres in Lisbon. In addition to the Trindade she worked at the Teatro da Rua dos Condes and at the D. Maria II National Theatre, playing with the Rey Colaço-Robles Monteiro theatre company. She also worked at the Teatro Avenida with the company of Alves da Cunha. She performed with most of the major Portuguese actors of the time, including Eduardo Brazão, Ângela Pinto, Chaby Pinheiro, and Alves da Cunha. From 1906 she made several more trips to Brazil. In 1906, while in Brazil, she made a recording of songs. Her trips to Brazil continued during World War I despite the dangers of an attack by German submarines.

== Cinema ==
In cinema, Oliveira debuted in the silent film Velha Gaiteira (1921). Her other films were:

- Cláudia (1923)
- Lucros... Ilícitos (1923)
- Os Olhos da Alma (1923)
- A Alma do Mar (1923)
- O Fado (1924)
- Lisboa, Crónica Anedótica (1930)
- As Pupilas do Senhor Reitor (1935)
- A Revolução de Maio (1937)
- Maria Papoila (1937)
- A Rosa do Adro (1938)
- Os Fidalgos da Casa Mourisca (1938)
- O Chapéu Florentino (1939)
- João Ratão (1940)
- Feitiço do Império (1940)
- Pão Nosso (1940)
- O Pai Tirano (1941)
- Lobos da Serra (1942)
- Amor de Perdição (1943)
- O Violino do João (1944)
- A Menina da Rádio (1944)
- A Vizinha do Lado (1945)
- Fogo! (1949)

== Death ==
Oliveira retired at the end of the 1940s. She died on 20 July 1968, in Lisbon, and is buried at the Prazeres Cemetery in Lisbon. She had never married and had no children.
