= Teresa Gomes =

Portuguese actress (1883-1962)

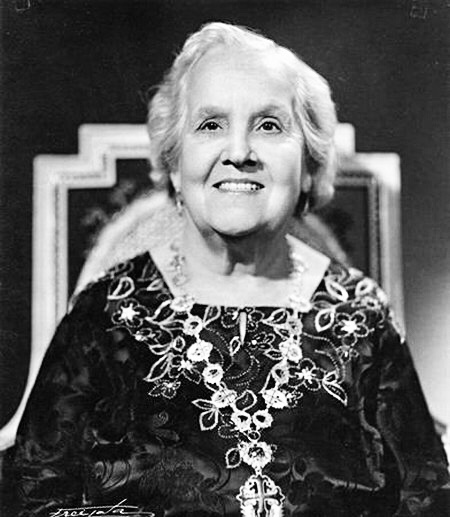
- Teresa Gomes with the insignia of the Military Order of Saint James of the Sword, 1959
- Born: Tereza Gomes de Almeida; 26 November 1883; Santa Isabel, Lisbon, Portugal
- Died: 13 November 1962 (aged 78); Coração de Jesus, Lisbon, Portugal
- Burial place: Prazeres Cemetery
- Occupation: Actress
- Years active: 1911-1959
- Spouse: António Sampaio Martins (m. 1907–1945) Álvaro de Almeida (m. 1937)
- Awards: Military Order of Saint James of the Sword

Teresa Gomes de Almeida (Lisbon, 26 November 1883 - Lisbon, 13 November 1962) was a Portuguese actress.

== Biography ==
Teresa Gomes was born in Lisbon, at number 60 Rua de Santo António à Estrela, parish of Santa Isabel, on 26 November 1883, the natural daughter of Barber widower Ludgero Veríssimo Gomes (born in Lisbon, in the parish of Santos-o-Velho) and Teresa Melanda (born in Alhadas, in the municipality of Figueira da Foz).

At the age of 23, on 26 August 1907, she married the merchant António Sampaio Martins, a native of the parish of São Bartolomeu in Coimbra, in the oratory of the Cadeia da Relação in Porto, where her fiancé was imprisoned for unknown reasons. She later separated from António Sampaio Martins.

Her vocation for the theatre was awakened when she was 26, on a voyage aboard a packet boat from Brazil during which she came into contact with the theatre company of Afonso Taveira and her future husband, the actor Álvaro de Almeida, with whom she got together, still married to her first husband.

In 1911, she made her debut as a backing vocalist in the revue A Musa dos Estudantes, at the Trindade Theatre, where she remained for eight years and from then on played important roles, such as the emblematic Alfacinhas. Having established herself as a class act, she moved on to the São Luiz Theatre, where her comedic flair was revealed in her first revue as an actress, in Eduardo Schwalbach's Pé de Meia, in 1919, or her interpretation of the role of "comadre Zefa" in the play Dois Garotos, among many others.

In addition to the Portuguese revue, Teresa Gomes experimented with declamatory theatre, operetta, comic opera and the dramatic genre, having worked with the companies of José Ricardo, Nascimento Fernandes, Maria Matos, Maria José das Neves, Hortense Luz, Vasco Morgado, Rey Colaço-Robles Monteiro Company, Maria Vitória and Avenida, among others. She was a very popular actress and held in high esteem by the public.

== Death and aftermath ==
Now retired, she died of natural causes on 13 November 1962, aged 78, on the fourth floor of 166 Rua Rodrigues Sampaio, in the parish of Coração de Jesus in Lisbon, where she lived. Her funeral, which left the Estrela Basilica for the Prazeres Cemetery, where the actress was buried in the Talhão dos Artistas, was largely attended by the population, who wanted to pay their last respects.

Her name is present in the toponymy of some places of: Almada (in the parish of Charneca de Caparica), Amadora (in the parish of Venda Nova), Lisbon (in the parish of São Domingos de Benfica, edict of 25 October 1971), Seixal (in the parishes of Fernão Ferro and Torre da Marinha), Sesimbra (in the parish of Castelo), Setúbal (in the parish of Azeitão) and Sintra (in the parish of Algueirão–Mem Martins).
