= As Pupilas do Senhor Reitor (film) =

- Directed by: José Leitão de Barros
- Based on: As Pupilas do Senhor Reitor by Júlio Dinis
- Starring: Joaquim Almada; Maria Matos; António Silva; Leonor d'Eça; Oliveira Martins
- Cinematography: Heinrich Gärtner
- Release date: 1 April 1935 (Portugal)
- Running time: 102 minutes
- Country: Portugal
- Language: Portuguese

As Pupilas do Senhor Reitor is a 1935 Portuguese film directed by José Leitão de Barros, starring Joaquim Almada, Maria Matos and António Silva and based on the novel of the same name by Júlio Dinis. It was released on 1 April 1935.

== Cast ==
- Joaquim Almada as Reitor
- Maria Matos as Joana
- António Silva as João da Esquina
- Leonor d'Eça as Pupil
- Maria Paula as Pupil
- Oliveira Martins as Pedro
- Paiva Raposo as Daniel
- Lino Ferreira as João Semana
- Carlos D'Oliveira as José das Dornas
- Emília de Oliveira as Senhora Teresa
- Costinha as Barbeiro
- María Castelar as Francisquinha
- Perpetua as Ti' Zefa
- Regina Montenegro
- Tereza Taveira
