= José Amaro =

José Amaro may refer to:

- José Amaro (actor) (1915–1975), Portuguese actor
- José Amaro (cyclist) (1954–1987), Portuguese racing cyclist
- José Amaro Tati, Governor of Cabinda (1995–2002) and of Bié (2002–2008), provinces of Angola
