= Maria Alves (Portuguese actress) =

Portuguese stage actress

- Born: 1897; Porto, Portugal
- Died: 31 March 1926; Lisbon, Portugal
- Resting place: Prazeres Cemetery, Lisbon
- Occupation: Actress
- Known for: Portuguese theatre
- Children: One son and one daughter

Maria Alves (1897-1926) was a Portuguese actress in the early 20th century who was murdered in the Portuguese capital, Lisbon, in 1926. Her murder became the basis for a film, a stage play, and a detective story.

== Professional life ==
Maria Alves was born in Campanhã, Porto, in 1897, and grew up wanting to be an actress. She made her debut at the Teatro Carlos Alberto in Porto, but moved to the capital in 1916, where she found roles as a chorus girl in the theatres in Parque Mayer, moving on to perform at the Éden Teatro and the Teatro Apolo. The businessman, Augusto Gomes, saw her potential as a star and hired her for his company, A Portugália, with which she toured Spain, France, Morocco and Brazil. Back in Lisbon she would build on her touring success and become the lead performer in variety shows at the Parque Mayer.

At the end of 1925 she accepted an invitation to spend the 1925/26 winter season in Porto. Oscar Ribeiro, director of the Teatro Águia d'Ouro, had promised her a large sum for three months of performances. She returned to Lisbon at the end of March, worried that she still had not been paid the last instalment of the contract. She wanted her daughter, who was living in Porto, to join her in Lisbon but needed money for this. She also had a son.

== Death ==
Alves' body was found at dawn on 31 March 1926. It had several wounds and was very bruised. Her coat, handbag and jewellery had been taken. Initially, the police concluded that she had been the victim of a robbery but Reinaldo Ferreira, a journalist with the newspaper O Século, who knew her well, thought otherwise. Without naming who he thought was the guilty party, he pointed people to a detective novel, titled El Mistério del Kursall, by the Spanish writer, José Francés, who was known as the Spanish Conan Doyle. In that novel it was the star's lover who murdered her.

Alves was buried in the Prazeres Cemetery. Her funeral procession was delayed by two hours because of the number of people wanting to participate. Meanwhile, another journalist, Antonio Ferro, who worked for the Diário de Notícias, and would later go on to be chief of propaganda for the Estado Novo dictatorship in Portugal, began to make his own investigations. He concluded that Alves could not have been murdered at the location her body was found. His suspicions fell on her manager, Augusto Gomes. Ferro discovered that the two were lovers, that Alves had complained about his fits of jealousy and that he had previously assaulted her.

Ferro published his allegations on 11 April 1926. He was then told by a neighbour of Gomes that he had seen a taxi in the early hours of 31 March containing Gomes and an inanimate woman. The Diário de Notícias published the story and Gomes was arrested. The neighbour had identified the taxi as a Citroën. As there were few taxis of this make in Lisbon at that time, it was easy to identify the driver, who turned out to be an acquaintance of Gomes. He admitted that Gomes had confessed to killing the actress. The number of his taxi was 9297 and the case rapidly became known as "The Case of Taxi 9297". Gomes' wife also admitted that he had told her but said that she had not told anyone because "he is the father of my children".

In his defence, Gomes stated that Alves had told him that she had had an affair while in Porto. He was sentenced to eight years in prison and twelve years of exile, for premeditated murder. The taxi driver was also given a prison term.

== In popular culture ==
In 1927 Reinaldo Ferreira, the journalist who had first hinted at the involvement of Gomes, directed the film O Táxi N.º 9297 at the Invicta Film studios in Porto. It received critical acclaim and large audiences. Ferreira then adapted the plot for the theatre and then further adapted the story into a detective novel, O Táxi da Morte, which was published in Domingo Ilustrado and republished in 2019. The film was restored by Cinemateca Portuguesa and shown at the Lumière Film Festival in Lyon, France in 2018.
