= Antonio Sarabia =

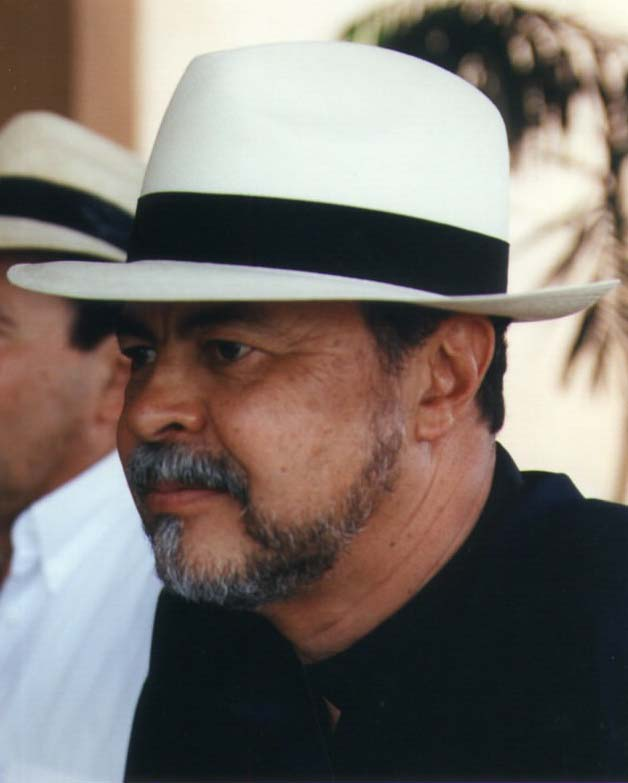
Antonio Sarabia

Antonio Sarabia (1944 - 2017) was a Mexican writer. He was born in Mexico City and studied Information Sciences at the Ibero-American University. He worked in advertising, but decided to become a full-time writer after the publication of his first book, the poetry collection Tres pies al gato (1978). In 1981, he moved to Paris, where he lived for the next decade and a half. Among his most notable works are El alba de la muerte, his debut novel which was nominated for the Premio Internacional Diana-Novedades in 1988, and Los convidados del volcán (1996), a critically acclaimed novel. He also published several collections of short stories, many of which have been anthologized.

He died in Lisbon and is interred in Cemitério dos Prazeres.
