= A Morgadinha dos Canaviais (film) =

1949 film

- Directed by: Caetano Bonucci; Amadeu Ferrari
- Based on: A Morgadinha dos Canaviais by Júlio Dinis
- Starring: Eunice Muñoz; Maria Matos
- Release date: 1949
- Running time: 93 minutes
- Country: Portugal
- Language: Portuguese

A Morgadinha dos Canaviais is a 1949 Portuguese film directed by Caetano Bonucci and Amadeu Ferrari, featuring Eunice Muñoz as Madalena and Maria Matos as Vitória.

The film is based on the romance novel, A Morgadinha dos Canaviais (1868), by Portuguese novelist Júlio Dinis, published in 1868. Set in the nineteenth century, the story revolves around Madalena Constança, a girl of great beauty and generosity.

== Cast ==
- Eunice Muñoz ... Madalena, Morgada dos Canaviais (majorat owner)
- Fernando Isidoro ... Taberneiro
- Paiva Raposo ... Henrique de Souzelas
- Tomás de Macedo ... Augusto
- Vitor Manuel ... Eduardo
- Helena do Vale ... Cristina
- Costinha ... Morgado das Perdizes (a majorat owner)
- Auzenda Maria ... Mariana
- Maria Matos ... D. Vitória
- Joaquim Miranda ... Cancela
- Jorge Moreira ... Angelo
- Maria Olguim ... Catarina
- Maria Emilia Vilas ... Maria de Jesus Doroteia, Madalena's aunt
- Alfredo Henriques ... Seabra
