= Teatro Apolo (Lisbon) =

Former theatre in Lisbon, Portugal

Teatro Apolo, previously Teatro do Príncipe Real
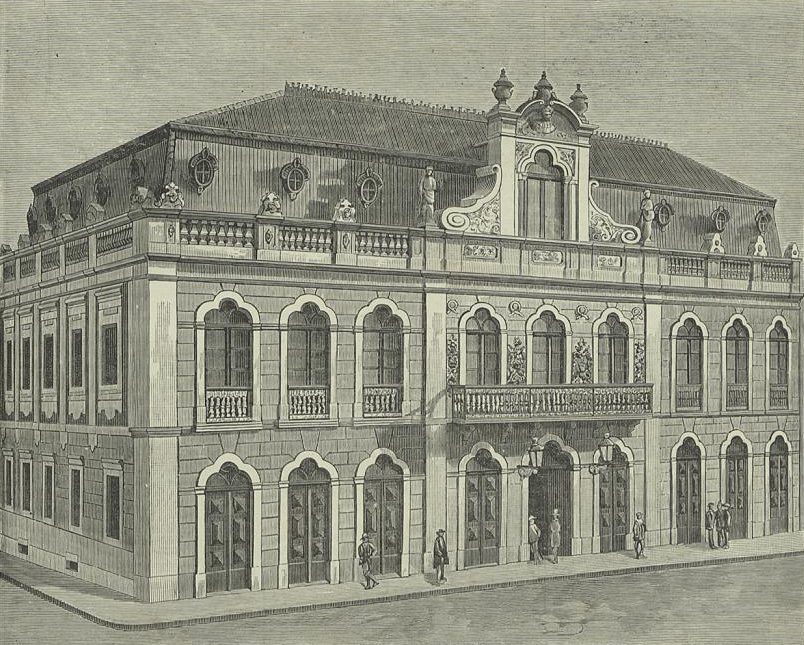
- The theatre in 1884
- Interactive map of Teatro Apolo, previously Teatro do Príncipe Real
- Address: Lisbon; Portugal
- Owner: Francisco Ruas

Construction
- Opened: 1866
- Closed: 1957 (demolished)

The Teatro Apolo, initially called Teatro do Príncipe Real, was a theatre in the Portuguese capital of Lisbon, opened in 1866. It was named in honour of the future King Dom Carlos when he was just three years old. In 1910, with the fall of the monarchy, its name was changed to Teatro Apolo. In 1957 the theatre was demolished.

== History ==
The theatre was built by Francisco Ruas on the corner of Rua Fernandes da Fonseca and Rua da Palma in the parish of Santa Justa. He had originally built a hall, which he named as the Vauxhall Hall, and held masquerade balls there. This proved unprofitable and he changed its name to Meyerbeer Hall, where concerts were performed, with even worse results.

His third effort, the Teatro do Príncipe Real, was inaugurated in 1866 with two comedies, Dois Pobres e Uma Porta (Two poor people and a door) in three acts, and the one-act Muito Padece quem Ama (Whoever loves suffers much). At that time, it was common to perform more than one play as part of a show. The theatre had a popular appeal, distinguishing it from many other Lisbon theatres that had a more bourgeois outlook. One of the best-known actors to perform regularly at the theatre was Adelina Abranches who was married to Luís Ruas, grandson of the original owner. Other well-known performers included José Carlos dos Santos and the Italian Ernesto Rossi, as well as Maria das Dores, Emília de Oliveira, Maria Alves, Ângela Pinto, António Pedro, Virgínia Dias da Silva, Luísa Fialho, Carolina Falco, and Tomásia Veloso. Little detailed information about shows and performers is available as many of the archives were lost when the building was demolished.

== Name change ==
Following the 5 October 1910 Revolution, when the Portuguese monarchy was overthrown, many organizations and buildings in Portugal that had been named after royal family members were renamed. The Teatro do Príncipe Real became the Teatro Apolo. The Teatro Apolo was demolished in 1957, not because of its lack of popularity but because of an urban renewal programme that saw the demolition of all neighbouring buildings. This demolition had been under consideration for some time as a 1938 publication reported seeing a sign saying "For Demolition" outside the theatre.

== See also ==
- List of theatres and auditoriums in Lisbon
