= Rua do Guarda-Mor =

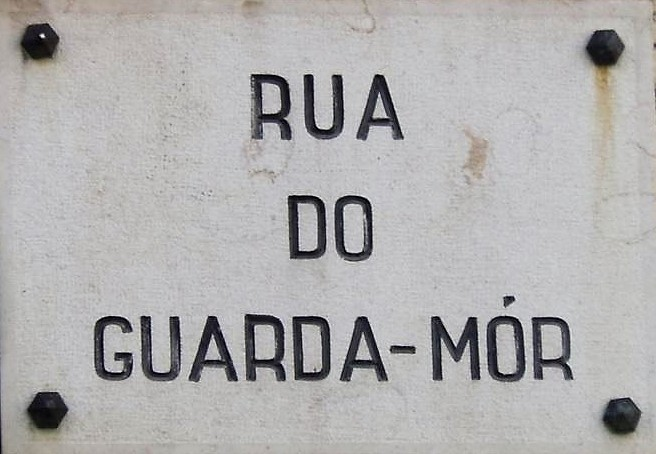
- Rua do Guarda-Mor

- Location within Lisbon
- Length: 150 m (490 ft)
- Quarter: Estrela
- Coordinates: 38°42′28″N 9°09′25″W
- From: Rua das Trinas
- To: Rua São João da Mata

The Rua do Guarda-Mor (Portuguese for "Street of the chief archivist") is a street in Lisbon, Portugal, which formerly belonged to the parish (freguesia) of Santos-o-Velho, more precisely to the sub-parish of Madragoa. Following the 2012 Lisbon Administrative Reform, the street now belongs to the newly created parish of Estrela. It starts at Rua das Trinas and ends at Rua São João da Mata.

== History ==
Already in 1565 the street is mentioned as Rua do Guarda-Mor de Alfandega in the Livro do Lançamento. Bernardo Gomes de Brito, Portuguese historian and scholar, refers to it as a main artery road of Lisbon of the sixteenth century. At that time it stretched from Rua das Trinas to Rua do Cura. With the 1859 Lisbon Civil Government Notice, the street got extended to include the Travessa da Palha (previously Rua da Palha de Santos) between Rua da Cura and Rua São João da Mata.

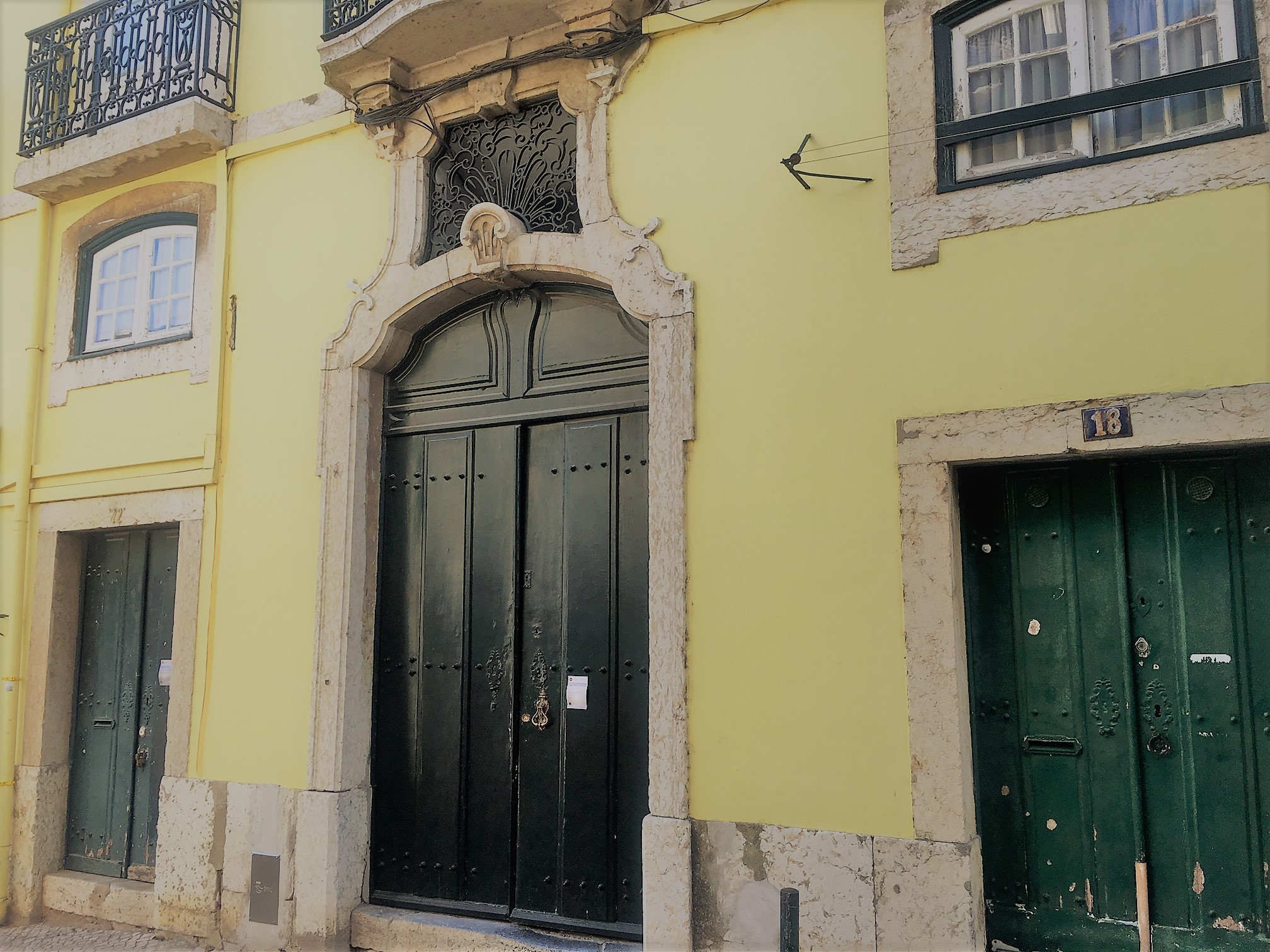
Rua do Guarda-Mor 20

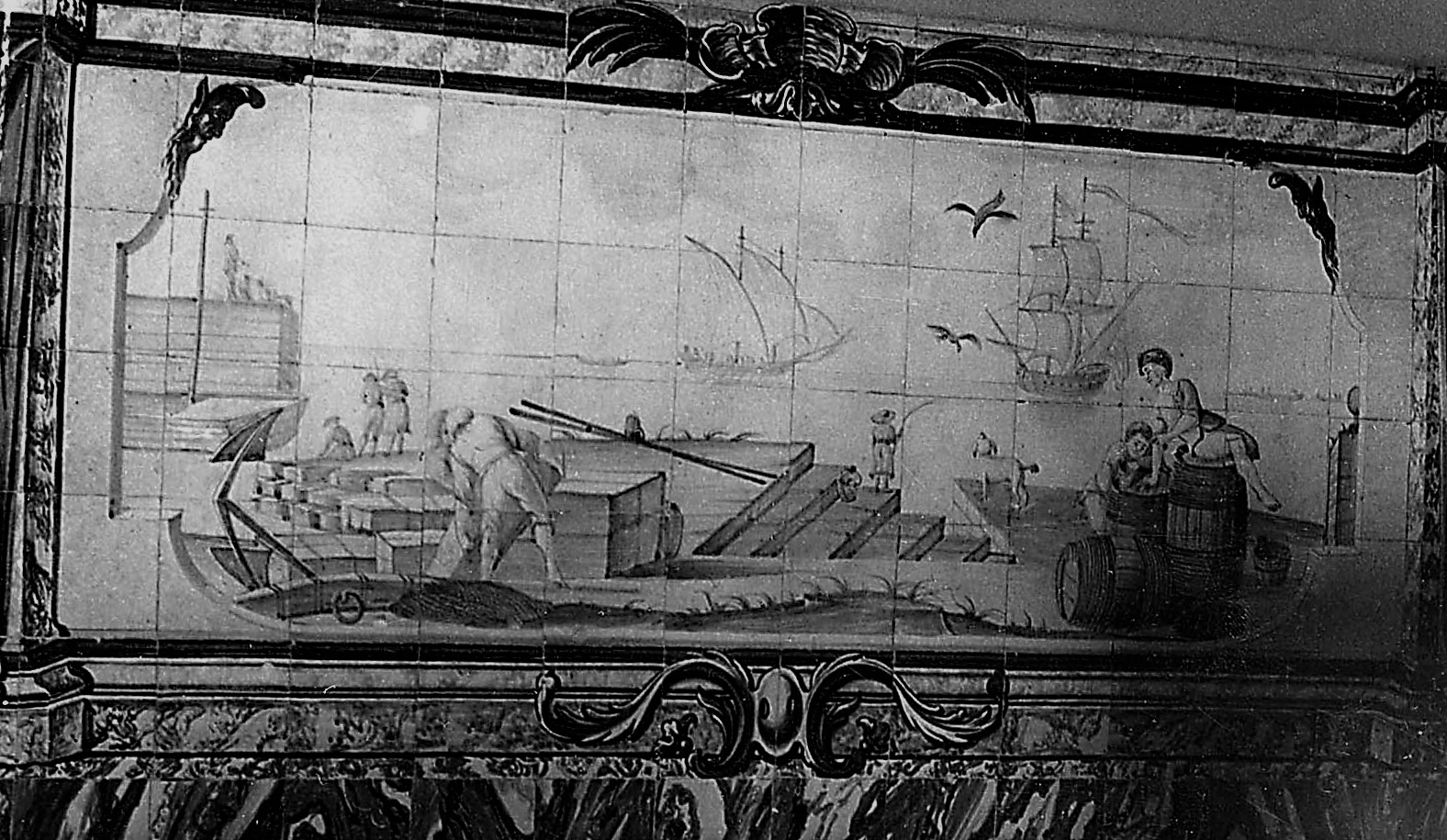
Rua do Guarda-Mor 20, 2nd floor, Tiles ornament

== Toponymy ==
The street's name derives from the nobleman Manuel de Sande, Guarda-Mor da Alfandega, who lived there together with his wife and daughter. He died there on March 6, 1603.

== Particular buildings ==
- #42-44: An ornament dating from the end of the 18th century consisting of tiles decorates the building's walls. The ornament shows rococo elements as well as neoclassical ones and represents the figure of Nossa Senhora de Penha de França with the child Jesus on her left arm and a scepter in her right hand.
- #39-43: João de Sousa Pinto de Magalhães lived and died in this building at the corner of Rua São João da Mata 16-20 on May 1, 1863.
- #20: This building is one of the very rare buildings in this area which survived the 1755 earthquake. On its second floor a large tiles ornament is still in place.
