= Aldeia da Roupa Branca =

- Directed by: Chianca de Garcia
- Screenplay by: Chianca de Garcia
- Produced by: Espectáculos de Arte
- Starring: Beatriz Costa; José Amaro; Manuel Santos Carvalho; Óscar de Lemos; Elvira Velez
- Cinematography: Aquilino Mendes; Octávio Bobone
- Edited by: Vieira de Sousa
- Music by: Raul Portela; Jaime Silva Filho; Raul Ferrão
- Production company: Tobis Portuguesa
- Distributed by: Internacional Filmes
- Release date: 2 January 1938 (Portugal)
- Running time: 82 minutes
- Country: Portugal
- Language: Portuguese

Aldeia da Roupa Branca is a 1938 Portuguese film directed by Chianca de Garcia.

This feature film premiered in 1939, and was a popular comedy. It was subject to a minor censorship cut on grounds of being deemed "immoral".

== Plot ==
The life, customs, conflicts and passions of those who are in charge of washing the clothes of Lisbon inhabitants — an artisanal but very competitive industry. Competition arises between Uncle Jacinto and goddaughter Gracinda, with the widow Quitéria and her son Luis.

== Cast ==
- Beatriz Costa: Gracinda
- José Amaro: Chico
- Manuel Santos Carvalho: Uncle Jacinto
- Óscar de Lemos: Luis
- Elvira Velez: Widow Quitéria
- Armando Machado: Zé da Iria
- Octavio de Matos: Simão
- Jorge Gentil: Chitas
- Mario Santos: Borges
- Aida Ultz
- Carlos Alves
