= Prazeres, Lisbon =

Prazeres
- Civil parish
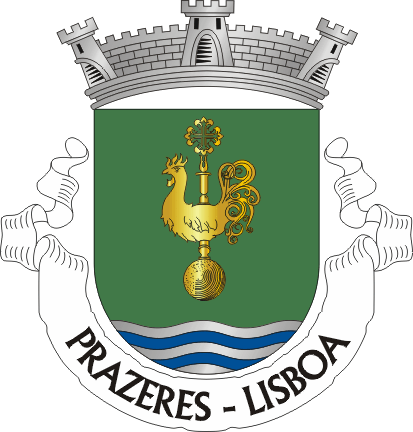
- Coat of arms

- Location in Portugal
- Coordinates: 38.42°N 9.10°W
- Country: Portugal
- Region: Lisbon
- Metropolitan area: Lisbon
- District: Lisbon
- Municipality: Lisbon
- Disbanded: 2012

Area
  - Total: 1.48 km^{2} (0.57 sq mi)

Population (2001)
  - Total: 8,492
  - Density: 5,700/km^{2} (15,000/sq mi)
- Time zone: UTC+00:00 (WET)
  - Summer (DST): UTC+01:00 (WEST)

Prazeres is a former civil parish (freguesia) in the city and municipality of Lisbon, Portugal. At the administrative reorganization of Lisbon on 8 December 2012 it became part of the parish Estrela.

== Main sites ==
- Prazeres Cemetery
- São Francisco de Paula Church
- Palace of Necessidades
