= Carolina Falco =

Portuguese stage actor (1839-1906)

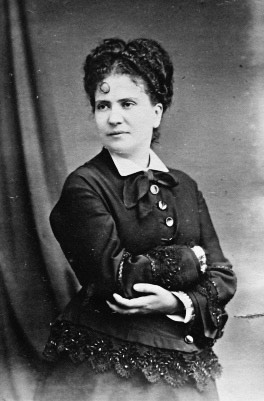
- Born: Carolina Augusta Falco; 24 February 1839; Lisbon, Portugal
- Died: 26 August 1906 Aged 67; Recife, Brazil
- Occupation: actor
- Years active: 55
- Known for: Lisbon and Brazilian theatre
- Spouse: César de Lacerda
- Children: Three sons

Carolina Falco (1839 – 1906) was a 19th-century Portuguese actress, dancer and singer, who became famous in both Portugal and Brazil.

== Early life ==
Carolina Augusta Falco was born on 24 February 1839 in what is now the parish of Misericórdia in the Portuguese capital of Lisbon. She was the daughter of Francisco Torres and Francisca Luísa Falco. She was baptized in the Church of Loreto in Lisbon, known as the Italians' Church, because her parents were of Italian descent.

== Early career ==
Falco's parents were employed at the Teatro Nacional de São Carlos in Lisbon and encouraged her to follow an artistic career. Carolina started her professional activity at just 5 years old, taking part in dancing performances at the Teatro do Salitre. She first acted at the Teatro de São Carlos in scenes from Henrik Ibsen's play Norma or a Politician's Love. Still only 10 years old, she received acclaim as a dancer in the ballet Paquita. She remained at the São Carlos until the age of 13. She studied dance, piano and singing at the National Conservatory of Lisbon.

Falco then briefly moved to the D. Maria II National Theatre, before returning to the São Carlos, where she was hired as a chorus girl and, after a few months, entrusted with part of the second lady in the opera I Lombardi alla prima crociata by Giuseppe Verdi. Her popularity in the role resulted in her staying at the São Carlos, until she decided to go to Portugal's second city, Porto, in 1858 where she rapidly developed a reputation as a singer in comic operas such as Fra Diavolo. She also spent nine months performing the role of Lady Macbeth's maid in Macbeth, the opera by Verdi.

== Travel to Brazil ==
In 1863 Falco was employed as a contralto for a company going to Brazil. At the Theatro Lyrico Fluminense in Rio de Janeiro she was very popular and was invited by the company's owner to go to Buenos Aires and Montevideo, but she declined as she was homesick. While in Brazil she met the actor, director and playwright, César de Lacerda, who she would marry in Belém in Brazil and with whom she would tour professionally throughout Brazil. Two sons were born in Porto Alegre, Brazil, and a third in Lisbon, shortly before the couple separated. In Lisbon in 1868, she was hired by the Santos & Pinto company to play at the Teatro do Príncipe Real (later known as the Teatro Apolo), and performed in La Grande-Duchesse de Gérolstein by Jacques Offenbach and other shows. She then followed the company to the D. Maria II National Theatre in 1873. She would later work for the Biester, Brazão company and the Rosas & Brazão company.

In June 1906, she went on tour to Brazil, ignoring the advice of doctors who had advised her not to make long trips. Working with the company of Ângela Pinto and Carlos Santos, the actress landed in Rio de Janeiro, debuting on 14 June at the Teatro de São José. The company then proceeded to Recife, where Carolina Falco died on 26 August. The tour was cancelled.
