= As Pupilas do Senhor Reitor =

As Pupilas do Senhor Reitor is a Portuguese romance novel by Júlio Dinis, written in 1863 and published in 1867. It was a success, and followed with a number of similar themed novels, such as A Morgadinha dos Canaviais (1868). The novel is set in the second half of the nineteenth century in a Portuguese village, and related the story of Margaret and Clara and her romances with the sons of the farmer, José das Dornas, Daniel and Pedro. It was adapted into three films: in 1922, in 1935 and in 1960. In 1995, Brazil, it has gained a novela adaption broadcast by SBT.
