= Maria das Dores =

Portuguese stage actor

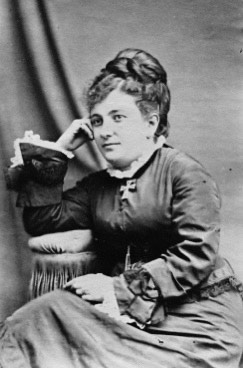
- Born: Maria das Dores Costa Polla; 11 June 1843; Lisbon, Portugal
- Died: 27 January 1928 (aged 84); New Bedford, Massachusetts, USA
- Occupation: actor
- Years active: 45
- Known for: Portuguese theatre
- Spouse: César Polla
- Children: One daughter

Maria das Dores (11 June 1843 – 27 January 1928) was a Portuguese actress who mainly worked in theatres in Lisbon.

== Early life ==
Maria das Dores Costa Polla was born in the former parish of Socorro in the Portuguese capital of Lisbon on 11 June 1843. She was baptized as the daughter of unknown parents, having been taken to the church for baptism by an aunt. Her father, Ricardo Benedito da Costa, was an employee of the D. Maria II National Theatre in Lisbon and her mother was apparently a dressmaker in the same theatre, but her name remains unknown. Her father would later acknowledge his paternity.

== Acting career ==
Dores started acting at the age of four at the D. Maria II theatre, being called on whenever a play had roles for children. Later, her participation in plays by Eugène Scribe, Jean-François Bayard and Adolphe d'Ennery became famous. Staying at the same theatre until 1869, she began to get increasingly important roles, as other actresses moved on. A particularly popular role was in La Tireuse de cartes (The Woman who draws cards) by Victor Séjour. She often played the role of the ingénue. In 1869 she joined the Lacerda-Machado company at the Teatro do Ginásio where she progressed to being promoted as the "first ingénue" of that theatre. While at the Ginásio she started a relationship with her future husband, the actor César Polla, who was still married to his first wife. With him, she toured cities in Portugal and Brazil.

In 1876, Dores moved to the Teatro do Príncipe Real, where she was very successful. Her daughter, Matilde Polla, who would also become an actor, was born in February 1877. She was not legitimized until after the marriage of Polla and Dores in 1889. In 1881, Dores returned to the Ginásio. She would later return to the Príncipe Real, by now renamed as the Teatro Apolo, and also work at Lisbon's Coliseu dos Recreios. Until it closed down, she also performed with the Teatro Livre (Free theatre) dramatic group. She continued to be very active until 1907, when she retired. After being widowed, Dores experienced financial difficulties and was also going blind. In the early 1920s she emigrated to the United States with her daughter, son-in-law and grandchildren. She died on 27 January 1928 in New Bedford, Massachusetts.
