= Mirita Casimiro =

Portuguese actress (1914–1970)

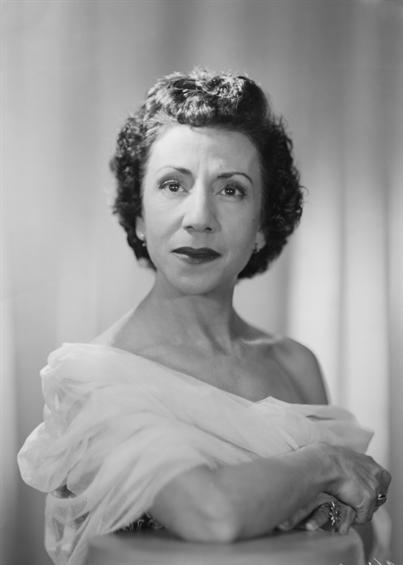
- Photo from 1955
- Born: Maria Zulmira de Almeida; 10 October 1914; Espinho, Portugal
- Died: 25 March 1970 (aged 55); Cascais, Portugal
- Occupation: actress
- Years active: 1935–68
- Spouse(s): Vasco Santana; João Jacinto
- Children: 1, with Jacinto

Maria Zulmira Casimiro de Almeida, popularly known as Mirita Casimiro (1914–1970), was a Portuguese actress and singer.

== Early life ==
Casimiro was born on 10 October 1914 in Espinho in northern Portugal, while her family was on vacation. The family was strongly involved in bullfighting; her father, José Casimiro de Almeida, a native of São Pedro do Sul and her grandfather, Manuel Casimiro de Almeida, were both bullfighters. By the way, her mother, Zulmira de Almeida, came from Viseu.

In 1935, Casimiro made her debut at the Teatro Maria Vitória in Lisbon, singing a few numbers in the revue Viva a Folia!, produced by the Maria das Neves Company. She then performed in several operettas, including one role as a transvestite, which was performed in the town in which she was born. One of her first major successes was the show Olaré Quem Brinca at the Teatro Variedades in Lisbon. Often, in the comedies in which she participated, she performed traditional songs from Beira Alta Province, wearing typical costumes and performing in the accent of that region. Her performance in an operetta, A Catraia do Bolhão, received widespread acclaim and shortly after she made her film debut, under the direction of José Leitão de Barros, in Maria Papoila (1937).

== Marriages and later career ==
On 14 August 1941, she married the actor Vasco Santana in Sintra. The two were a very popular acting duo, honeymooning to sold-out houses after their wedding, and even formed a theatre company. However, a controversial legal separation decreed by a court ruling in 1947, led to Casimiro being almost banned from the Portuguese stage due to her ex-husband's influence, appearing only spasmodically in a few revues. She then left the country to try her luck acting in Brazil, where she worked without achieving great popularity, staging children's plays, performing poetry recitals, and showcasing Portugal's theatre. Since the divorce was never finalised, the two remained married until Santana's death in 1958. She remarried to João Jacinto, a Brazilian sports journalist and former athlete, with whom she had a daughter, Maria, known as Mariquita.

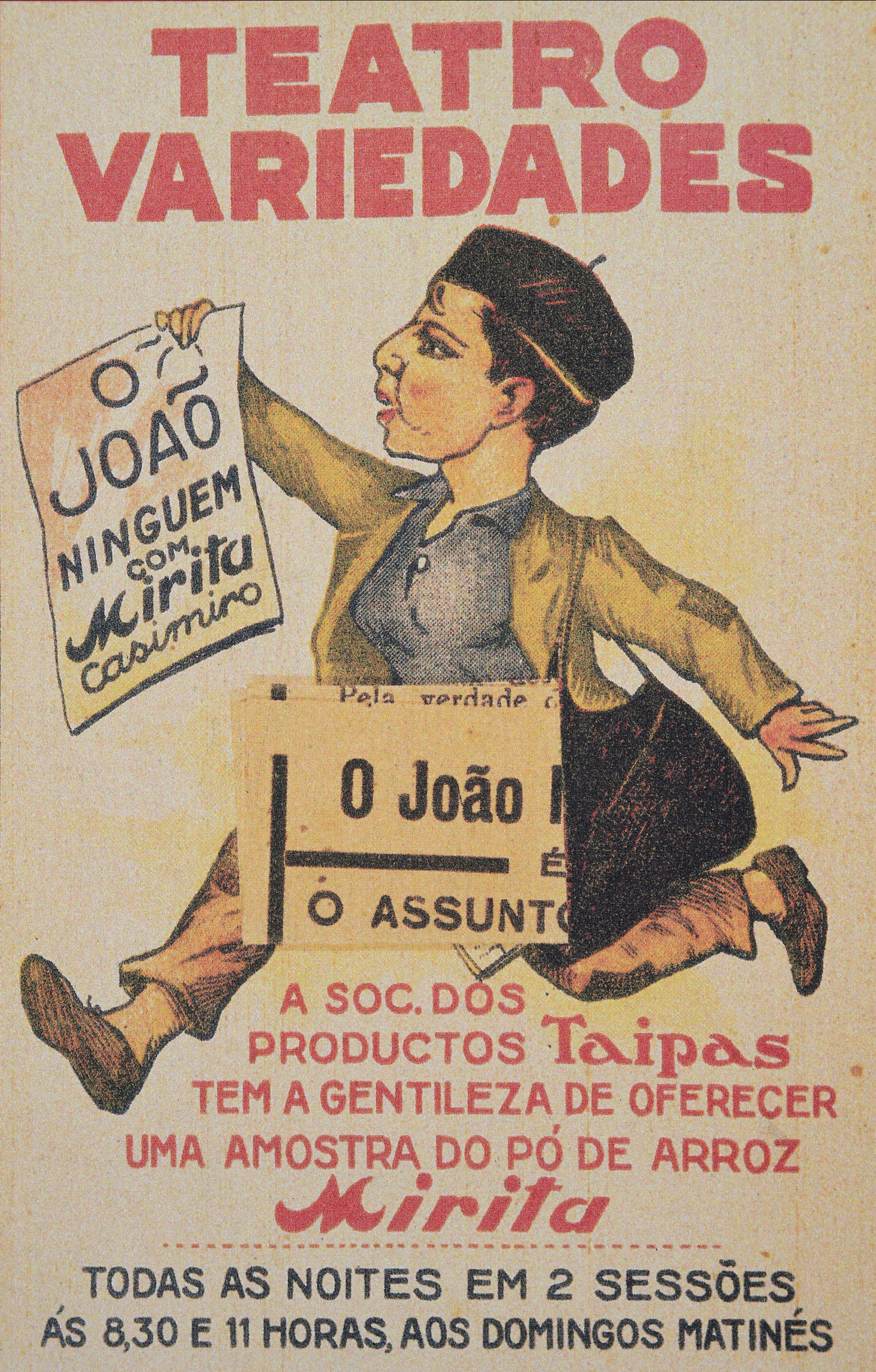
Poster advertising one of Casimiro's shows in 1936

Upon returning to Portugal in 1964, divorced again, she was invited to join the cast of the Teatro Experimental de Cascais. Under the direction of Carlos Avilez, she was part of the cast of some of that company's landmark plays that were associated with the renewal of Portuguese theatre in the 1960s, The House of Bernarda Alba by Federico García Lorca (1966), The Crazy Girl from Arroios by André Brun (1966) and The Police Commissioner by Gervásio Lobato (1968).

In 1968, Casimiro was injured in a serious car accident near Porto, which left her disfigured. She and a friend had been hitchhiking from Lisbon to Porto when she was hit by a car that skidded in heavy rain. Deeply depressed and unable to resume her stage work, she committed suicide as a result of an overdose on 25 March 1970 at her home in Cascais. She was buried in the Viseu Cemetery, from where the Casimiro de Almeida family originated. The funeral procession took place on 27 March 1970, World Theatre Day, and included a Guard of Honour.

== Recognition ==
In 1986, the theatre occupied by the Teatro Experimental de Cascais theatre company in Estoril was named after her as Teatro Municipal Mirita Casimiro. In the city of Viseu, her name is remembered by another theatre, the Auditório Mirita Casimiro. Several towns have roads or other geographical features named after her.
