= Luísa Fialho =

Portuguese 19th-century stage actor

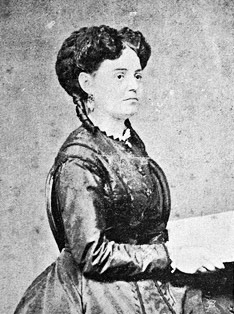
- Luísa Fialho in 1869 at the age of 30
- Born: Luísa Leopoldina Fialho; 15 February 1839; São Julião da Barra, Portugal
- Died: 7 November 1891 (aged 52); Lisbon, Portugal
- Resting place: Alto de São João Cemetery, Lisbon
- Occupation: Actor
- Years active: 20
- Known for: Portuguese theatre

Luísa Fialho (15 February 1839 – 7 November 1891) was a Portuguese actress. She performed for the first time when she was 13, making her professional debut at age 14. She made her final performance during the Carnival of 1873, as she suffered a severe attack of paralysis, which followed a smaller attack the previous year.

== Early life ==
Luísa Leopoldina Fialho was born in Portugal on 15 February 1839 in the Fort of São Julião da Barra in what is now the parish of Oeiras e São Julião da Barra, Paço de Arcos e Caxias, to the west of Lisbon. Her father, Luís Cordeiro Fialho, was a military officer posted at the fort. Her mother was Josefa Joaquina Pereira. Fialho had four brothers, the last two also having brief theatrical careers. She performed for the first time at the age of 13 for an amateur dramatics society and received considerable applause.

== Professional career ==
Fialho made her professional debut at the age of 14, at the Teatro da Rua dos Condes, on 21 December 1853, alongside actor José Simões Nunes Borges. Within a short time she was the most prominent figure in the company playing at that theatre. From 1856 to 1858 she moved to the Teatro D. Fernando, where she was very successful in several Portuguese plays. In 1858 she returned to the Rua dos Condes, where she had a fantastic reception, with the stage being covered with flowers thrown by the audience. Her workload was exhausting, sometimes performing in two different plays every night and even singing a song or doing a comic routine during the intervals. She then followed her manager to the Teatro do Príncipe Real, later the Teatro Apolo, creating, among other roles, that of "Wanda" in La Grande-Duchesse de Gérolstein, with Emília Letroublon as the Duchess. In 1868 she went to perform in Portugal's second city of Porto, receiving a similarly enthusiastic reception.

== Later life ==
In 1870, Fialho returned to the Rua dos Condes, where she performed comic operas. She then went back to the Príncipe Real to perform the burlesque opera Le pont des soupirs (The Bridge of Sighs), by Jacques Offenbach as well as a comic opera. Already feeling ill, she was advised by her doctors to leave Lisbon. Returning to the Rua dos Condes in 1872, she was afflicted with a small attack of paralysis. She improved a little and during the Carnival of 1873 she was performing. It was, however, her last performance because she then suffered a more severe attack and could never raise her arms again.

Although Fialho suffered some poverty after that, she was not forgotten by the public or by her professional colleagues, who would organize benefit performances for her. She died on 7 November 1891. She was buried in Lisbon's Alto de São João Cemetery.
