= Torre da Marinha =

Place in Seixal, Portugal

Torre da Marinha (Portuguese: the marine tower) is a locality in the parish of Arrentela and the city of Seixal in Portugal. In recent years, it was passed for a locality with a dense and a diverse population.

It was reclaimed directly as a parish. It has all necessary infrastructure − a municipal square, a police station, a health center, schools, a pool, and the Rio Sul Shopping shopping center.
