= Santos-o-Velho, Lisbon =

Santos-o-Velho
- Civil parish
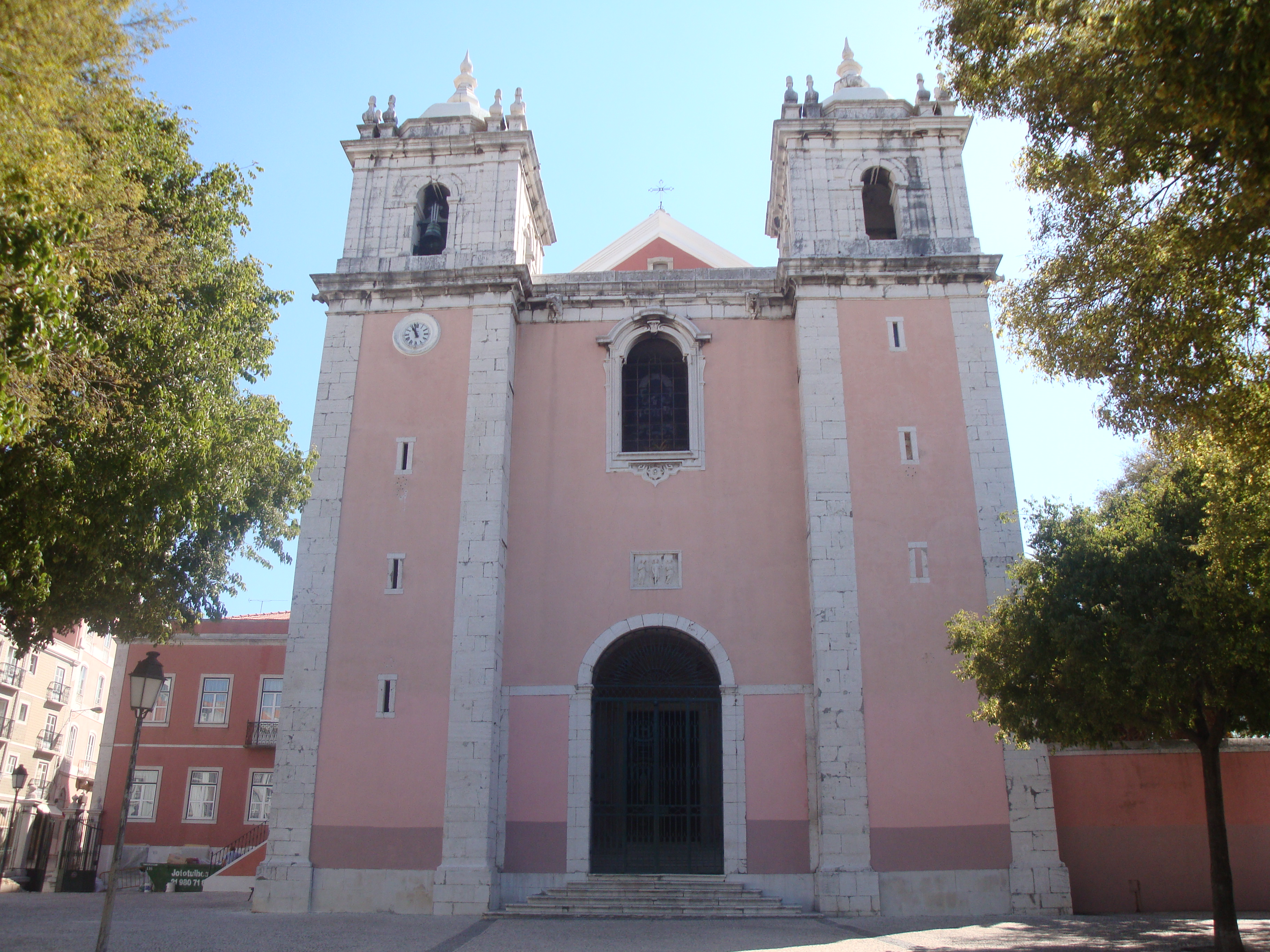

- Location in Portugal
- Coordinates: 38°42′25″N 9°09′22″W
- Country: Portugal
- Region: Lisbon
- Metropolitan area: Lisbon
- District: Lisbon
- Municipality: Lisbon
- Disbanded: 2012

Area
  - Total: 0.51 km^{2} (0.20 sq mi)

Population (2001)
  - Total: 4,013
  - Density: 7,900/km^{2} (20,000/sq mi)
- Time zone: UTC+00:00 (WET)
  - Summer (DST): UTC+01:00 (WEST)
- Website: jf-estrela.pt

Santos-o-Velho (Portuguese pronunciation: [ˈsɐ̃tuz u ˈvɛʎu]) is a former freguesia (civil parish) of Lisbon, Portugal, with an area of 0.51 km^{2} and 4,013 inhabitants (2001). It has a population density of 7899.6 inhabitants/km^{2}. At the administrative reorganization of Lisbon on 8 December 2012 it became part of the parish Estrela.

It is one of the best preserved historical parts of Lisbon, including Madragoa (former village in the outskirts of Central Lisbon), the Museum of Ancient Art, and many former convents and palaces (in which the current French Embassy in included).

Well-known streets of this parish are Rua das Trinas, Rua do Guarda-Mor, Rua do Quelhas, Rua das Praças, and Avenida 24 de Julho.

It is also known for its lively nightlife.
