= José Amaro (actor) =

Portuguese actor

- Born: José Amaro Pinheiro; 11 December 1915; Lisbon, Portugal
- Died: 15 September 1975 (aged 59)
- Occupation: Actor

José Amaro was a Portuguese actor, best known for his roles in Camões (1946), Bola ao Centro (1947) and Passagem de Nível (1965).

Amaro was born on 11 December 1915 in Lisbon, Portugal. Besides his roles in the cinema, he also acted in theatre plays and comic operas. Later in his life he worked as chief content officer at the Colonial Radio of Angola.

Amaro died on 15 September 1975, in Portugal. A street in Carnaxide is named after him ("rua Actor José Pinheiro Amaro").

== Filmography ==
- 1937 - Maria Papoila
- 1939 - Aldeia da Roupa Branca: "Chico"
- 1943 - Amor de Perdição (based on a novel of the same name): (uncredited)
- 1946 - Camões: "Dom Manuel de Portugal"
- 1947 - Bola ao Centro: "Zé António"
- 1947 - Três Espelhos
- 1949 - Vendaval Maravilhoso - Life and loves of Castro Alves
- 1950 - Frei Luís de Sousa (based on a play of the same name): "Miranda"
- 1950 - O Desterrado - Life and work of Soares dos Reis (Short)
- 1952 - A Garça e a Serpente: (uncredited)
- 1965 - Passagem de Nível: "Batalha"
- 1973 - O Rei Está a Morrer (TV Movie): "Sentinel"
