= Estrela, Lisbon =

Estrela
- Civil parish
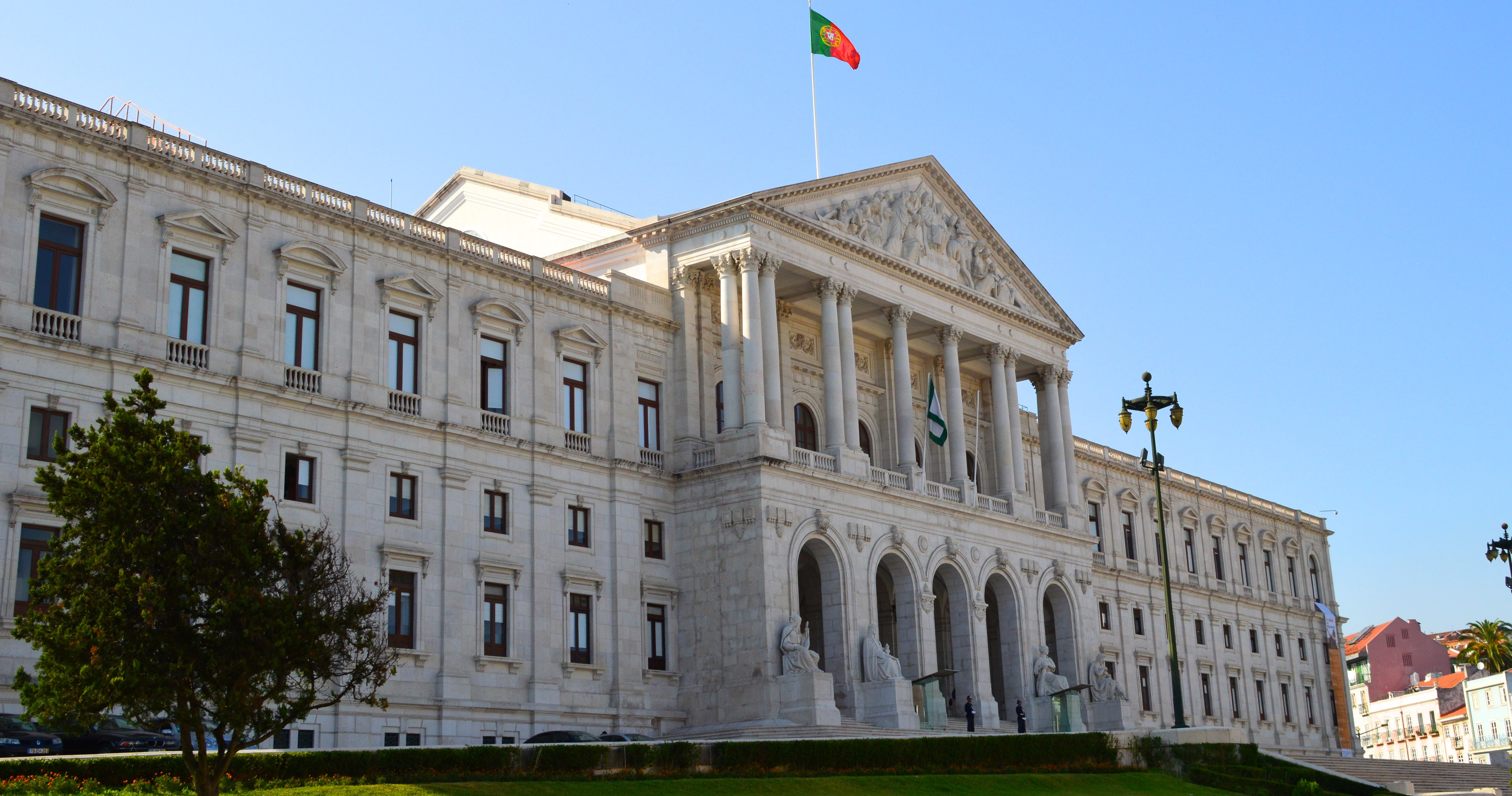
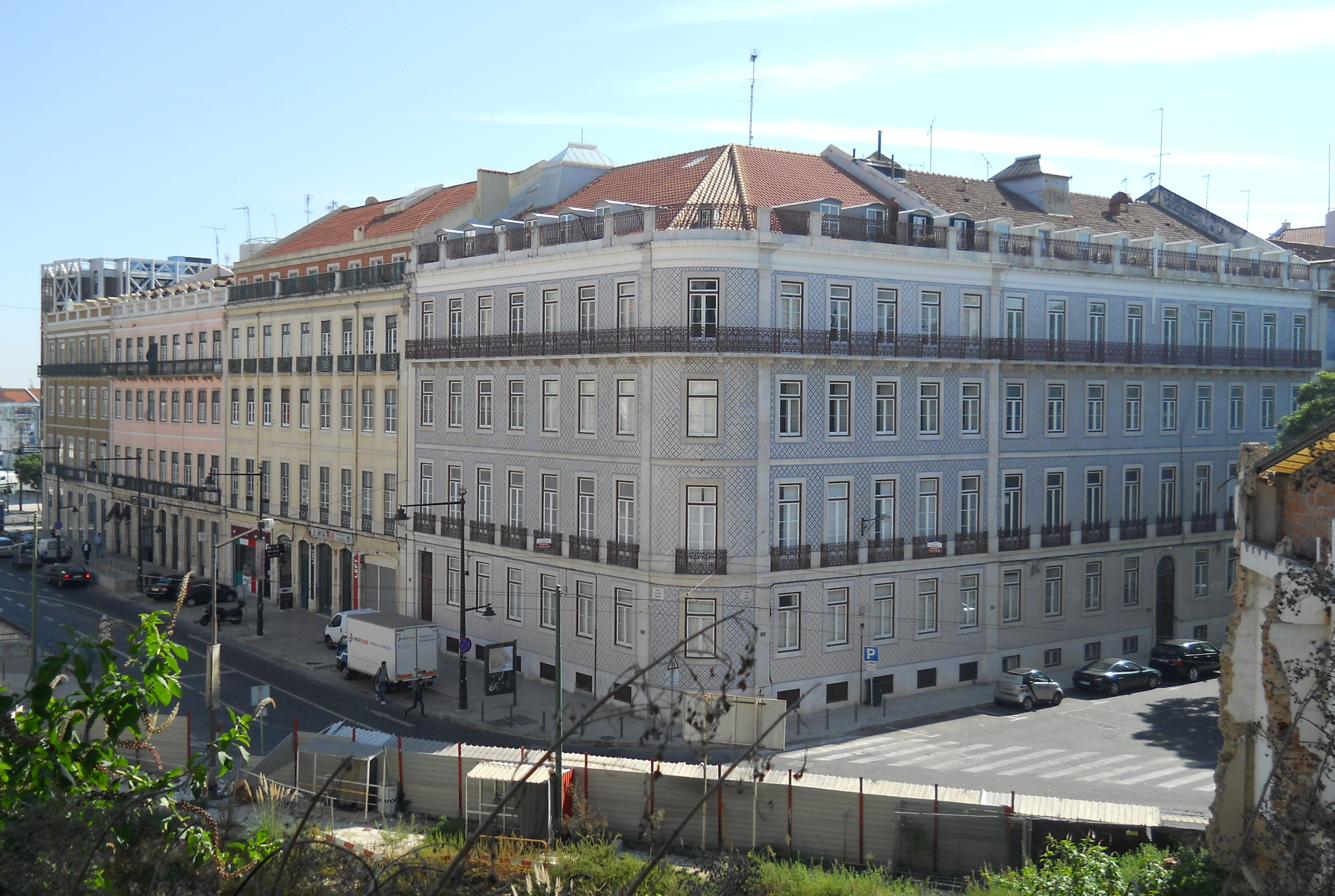
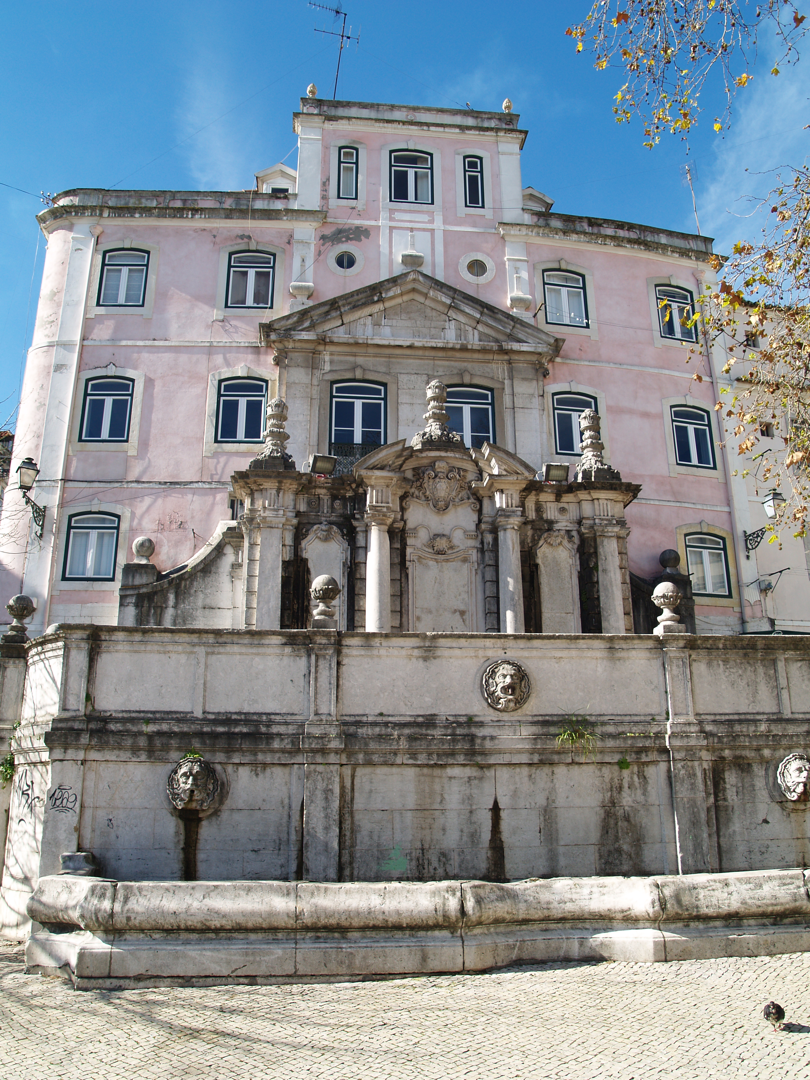
- Clockwise: São Bento Palace; Santos waterfront; Chafariz da Esperança; Estrela Basilica; Necessidades Palace.

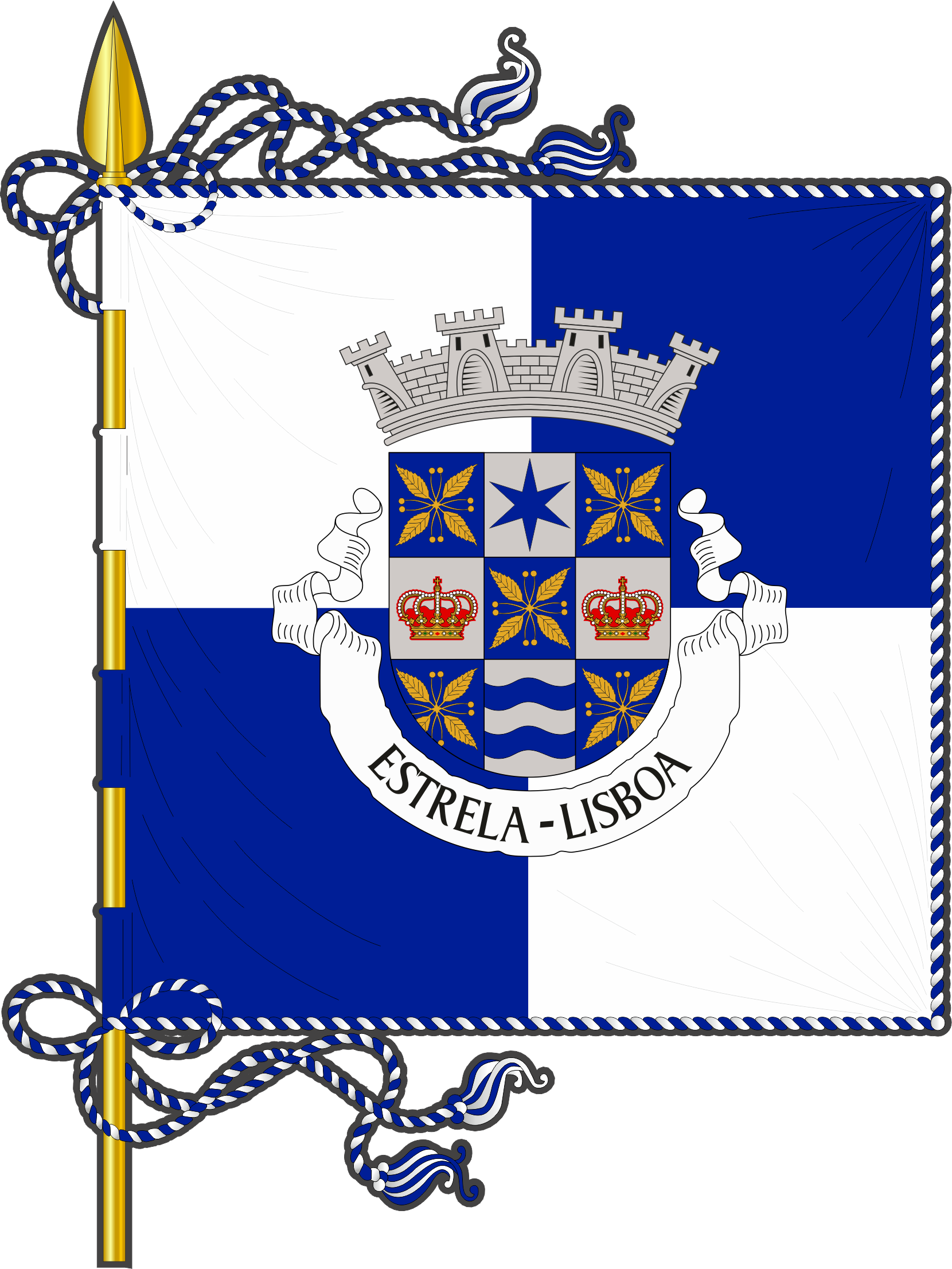
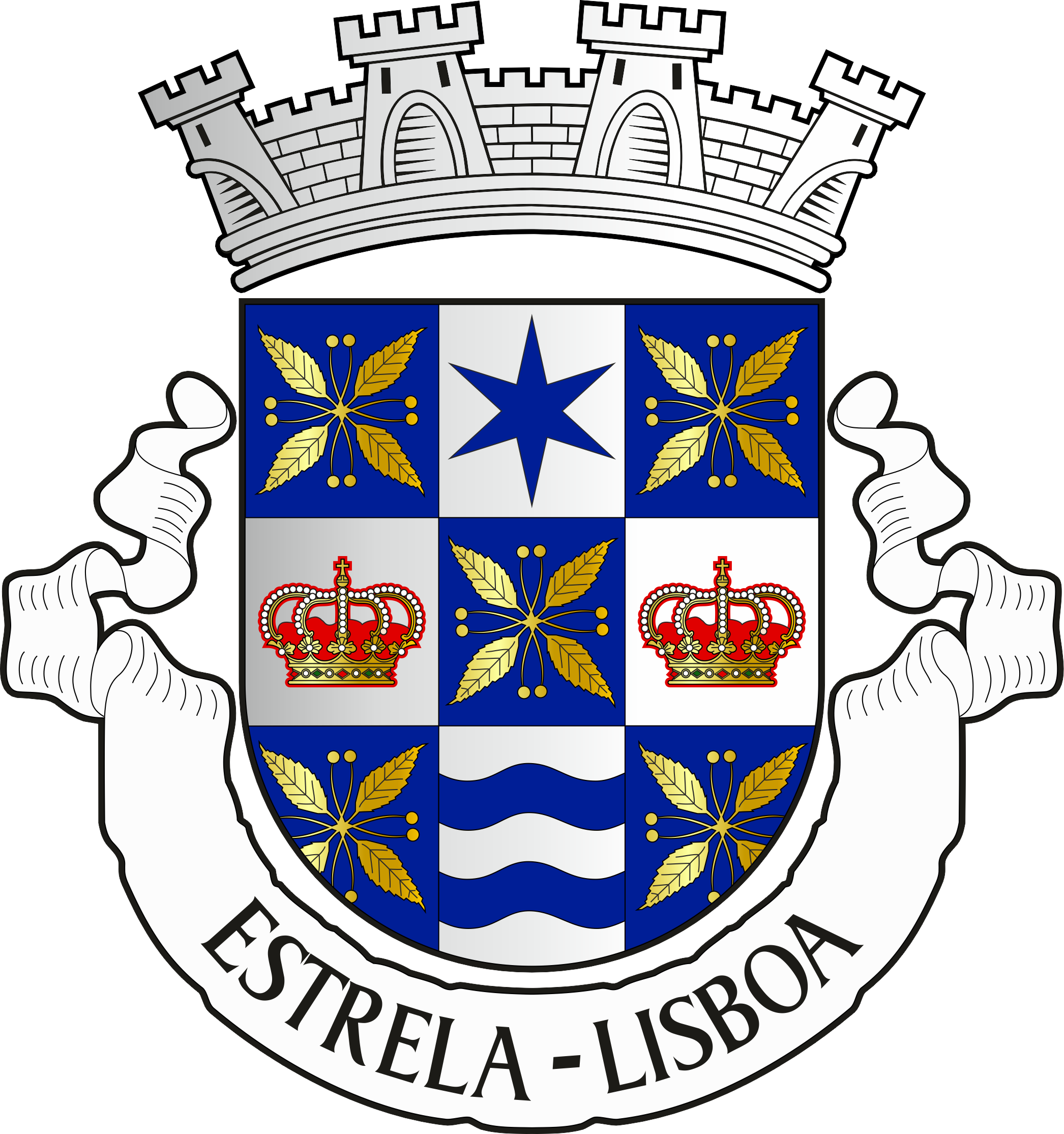
- Flag Coat of arms

- Coordinates: 38.714°N 9.160°W
- Country: Portugal
- Region: Lisbon
- Metropolitan area: Lisbon
- District: Lisbon
- Municipality: Lisbon

Area
  - Total: 4.60 km^{2} (1.78 sq mi)

Population (2011)
  - Total: 20,128
  - Density: 4,380/km^{2} (11,300/sq mi)
- Time zone: UTC+00:00 (WET)
  - Summer (DST): UTC+01:00 (WEST)

Estrela (Portuguese pronunciation: [ɨʃˈtɾelɐ]) is a freguesia (civil parish) and district of Lisbon, the capital of Portugal. Located in the historic center of Lisbon, Estrela is south of Campo de Ourique, west of Misericórdia, and east of Alcântara. The population in 2011 was 20,128. The Portuguese word estrela means star in English.

== History ==
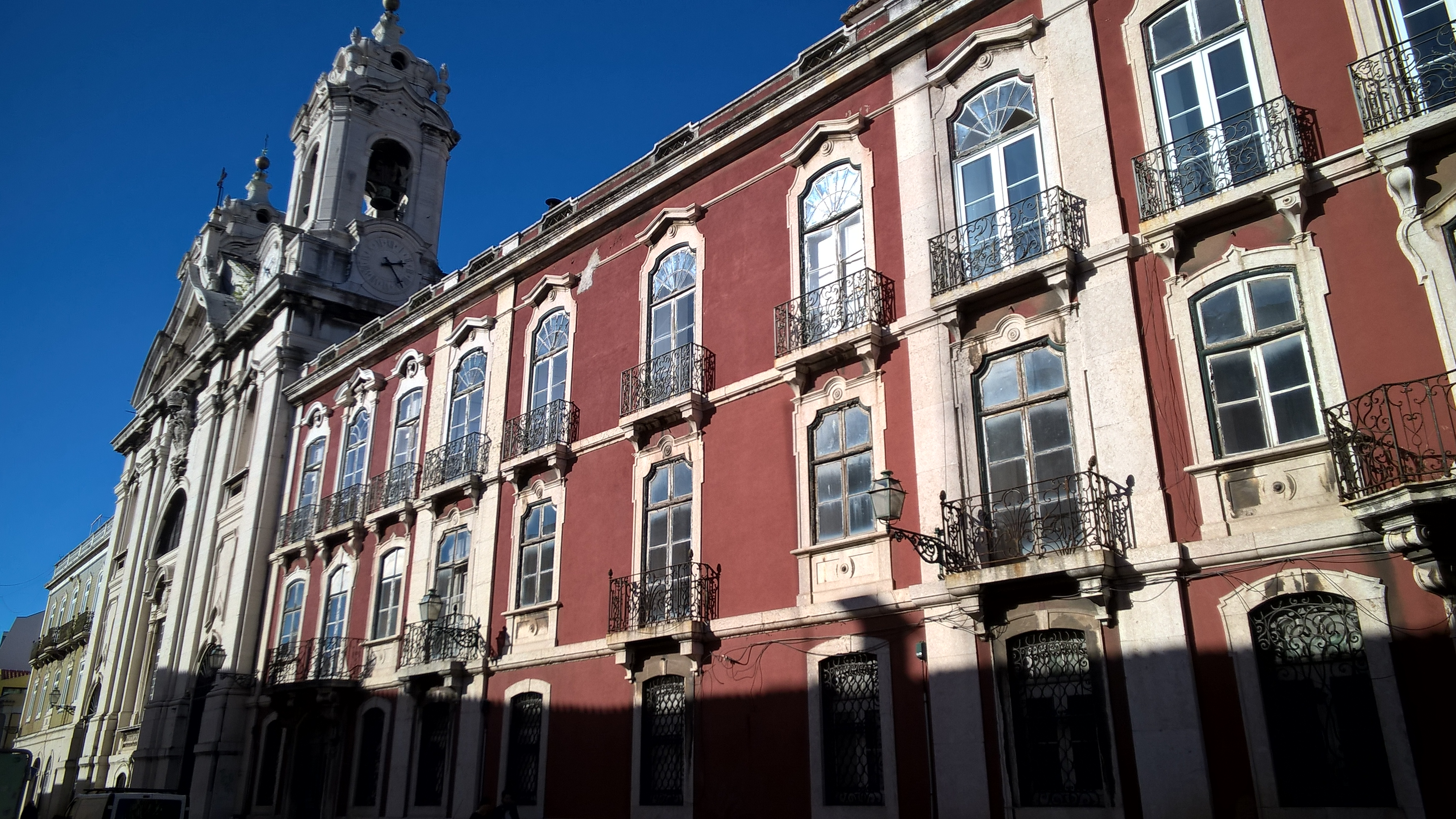
The Igreja de São Francisco de Paula was built in 1719.

This new parish was created with the 2012 Administrative Reform of Lisbon, merging the former parishes of Lapa, Santos-o-Velho and Prazeres.

== Landmarks ==
The parish is the site of the Assembly of the Republic (the Portuguese Parliament) and of São Bento Mansion, the official residence of the Prime Minister of Portugal. Further landmarks are the Estrela Basilica, the Convento das Bernardas, the building of the Rua das Janelas Verdes, the Rua do Guarda-Mor, or the Rua do Sacramento.

=== Embassies ===
It also hosts many embassies, in particular, Austria, Bulgaria, Canada, China, Finland, Indonesia, Ireland, Luxembourg, the Sovereign Military Order of Malta, Netherlands, Romania, Sweden, Switzerland and the United Kingdom.
