= Eunice Muñoz =

Portuguese actress (1928–2022)

Eunice Muñoz OSE GCIH
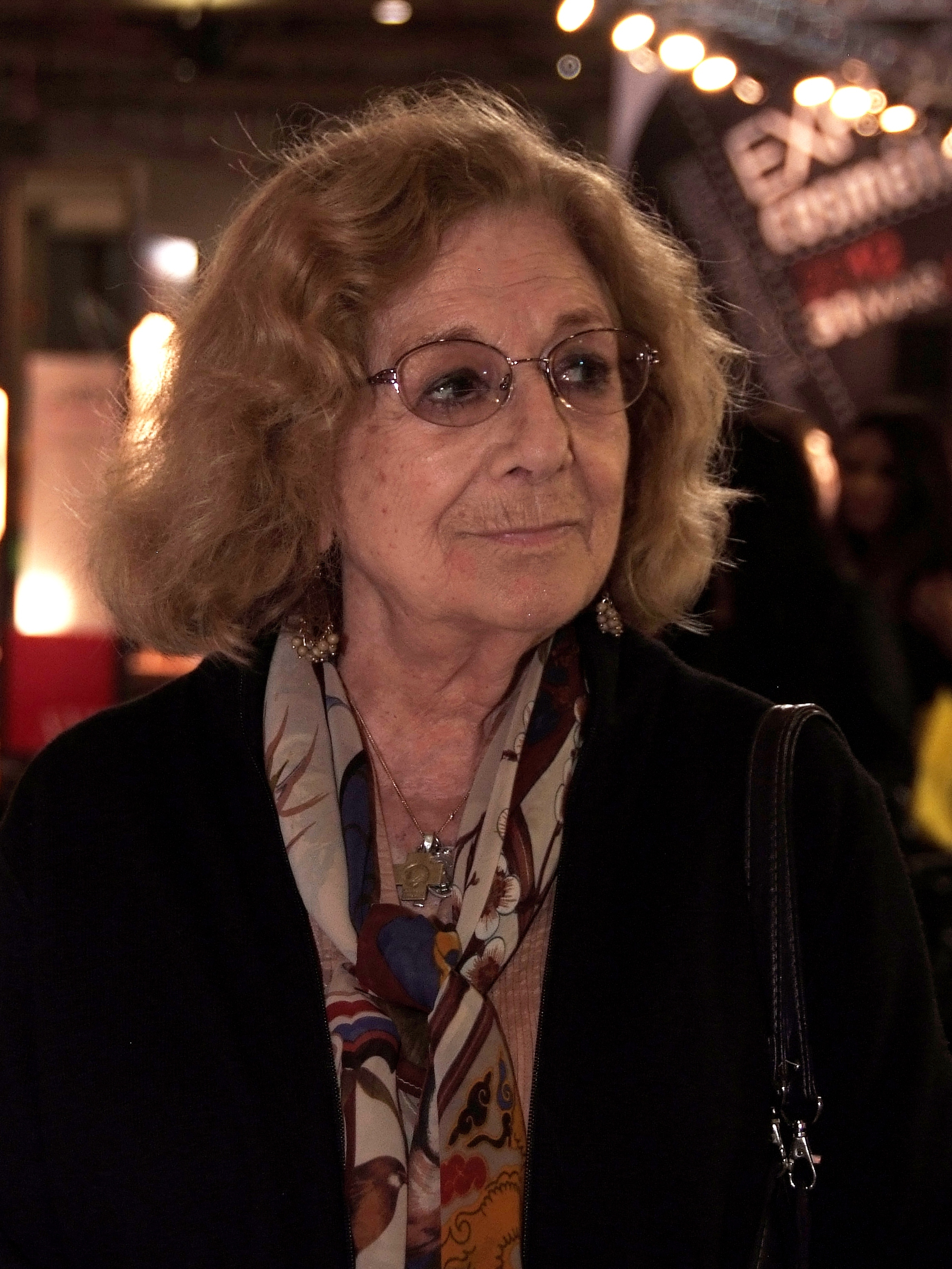
- Muñoz in 2012
- Born: 30 July 1928; Amareleja, Portugal
- Died: 15 April 2022 (aged 93); Lisbon, Portugal
- Occupation: Actress
- Years active: 1943–2022

Eunice Muñoz OSE GCIH (30 July 1928 – 15 April 2022) was a Portuguese actress, considered one of the best Portuguese actresses of all time.

== Early life and career ==
Eunice Muñoz was born in Amareleja, Portugal. She studied at the Portuguese National Conservatory, nowadays the Lisbon Theatre and Film School (Escola Superior de Teatro e Cinema).

Muñoz was awarded the title of honoris causa by the University of Évora in 2009.

== Death ==
She died in Carnaxide on 15 April 2022, at the age of 93.

== Selected filmography ==
- Camões (1946)
- Um Homem do Ribatejo (1946)
- Os Vizinhos do Rés-do-Chão (1947)
- A Morgadinha dos Canaviais (1949)
- Ribatejo (1949)
- Cantiga da Rua (1950)
- O Trigo e o Joio (1965)
- Manhã Submersa (1980)
- A Fachada (1986)
- Repórter X (1987)
- Matar Saudades (1988)
- Hard Times (1988)
- Between the Fingers (2008)
