= Maria Papoila =

- Directed by: Leitão de Barros
- Starring: Mirita Casimiro; António Silva; Eduardo Fernandes
- Release date: August 15, 1937
- Running time: 98 minutes
- Country: Portugal
- Language: Portuguese

Maria Papoila is a 1937 Portuguese comedy film directed by Leitão de Barros.

== Cast ==
- Mirita Casimiro: Maria Papoila
- António Silva: Mr. Scott, the American
- Eduardo Fernandes: Eduardo da Silveira
- Alves da Costa: Carlos
- Maria Cristina: Margarida Nonronha Baptista
- Joaquim Pinheiro: Soldier 27
- Virginia Soler: Elvira, the cook
- Amélia Pereira: D. Casimiria
- Perpétua dos Santos: Aunt Joaquina
- José Amaro
