= A Morgadinha dos Canaviais =

1868 novel by Júlio Dinis

A Morgadinha dos Canaviais is a Portuguese romance novel by Júlio Dinis, published in 1868. Set in the nineteenth century, the story revolves around Madalena Constança, a girl of great beauty and generosity.

The novel was made into a film in 1949, directed by Caetano Bonucci and Amadeu Ferrari.
