= Maria Matos =

Portuguese actress and theatre personality

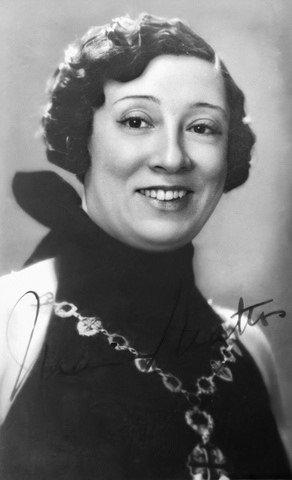
- Maria Matos in 1934
- Born: Maria de Conceição de Matos Ferreira da Silva; 29 September 1886; Lisbon, Portugal
- Died: 19 September 1952 (aged 65); Lisbon

Maria de Conceição de Matos Ferreira da Silva (29 September 1886 – 19 September 1952) was a Portuguese actress and theatre personality.

== Career ==
Matos studied piano, singing and dramatic art at the Royal Conservatory of Lisbon, and for her final exam performed Rosas de Todo Ano, written by Júlio Dantas.

She debuted professionally at the D. Maria II National Theatre in the play Judas (1907). She married in 1913 the actor Mendonça de Carvalho, who founded the theater company Maria Matos - Mendonça de Carvalho, a company that enjoyed considerable prestige in Portuguese theatre. In 1940, she was appointed at the Conservatório Nacional de Teatro, where she was head of Theatrical aesthetics and Vocal coaching.

Her talent was particularly evident in the farce and the comedy. In the film she starred in successful films such as O Costa do Castelo (1943) and A Menina da Rádio (1944), directed by Arthur Duarte and costarring with António Silva. She also starred in other movies such as As Pupilas do Senhor Reitor (1935), Varanda dos Rouxinóis (1939) by José Leitão de Barros and A Morgadinha dos Canaviais (1949) by Caetano Bonucci and Amadeu Ferrari.

Matos also wrote for A Tia Engrácia, Direitos de Coração and Escola de Mulheres, romantic parts. She died 10 days before her 66th birthday on 19 September 1952. After her death, her memoirs were published As Memórias da Actriz Maria Matos, and she was honored by having a theatre in Lisbon being called Teatro Maria Matos in 1969.

== Personal life ==
She was the mother of actress Maria Helena Matos (1911 - 2002).

== Honours ==
The Teatro Maria Matos, inaugurated on 22 October 1969, was named in her honour; at its inauguration, artistic director Igrejas Caeiro presented Tombo no Inferno by Aquilino Ribeiro in her memory.
