= Adelina Abranches =

Portuguese actress

Adelina Abranches OSE
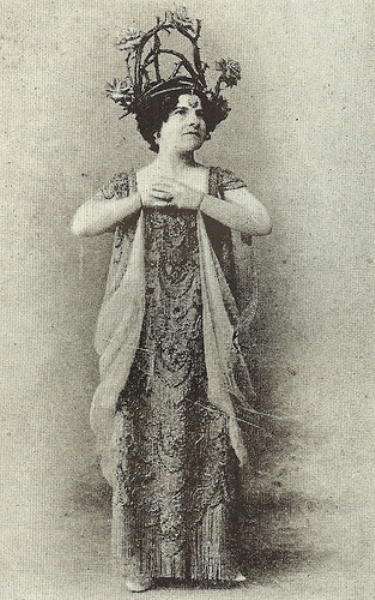
- Born: Margarida Adelina Abranches; 15 August 1866; Lisbon, Portugal
- Died: 21 November 1945 (aged 79); Lisbon, Portugal
- Other name: Adelina Ruas
- Occupation: Actress

Adelina Abranches OSE (15 August 1866 – 21 November 1945) was a Portuguese stage actress born in Lisbon. She was a child prodigy, performing roles on stage at the age of four. She is notable for her acting career in Rio de Janeiro.

== Overview ==
She was born in Lisbon, Portugal. A theatrical child prodigy, she first performed at just four years of age in the piece Meninos Grandes ("Big Kids") at the National Theatre D. Maria II in Lisbon. She became known as "the Spanish girl" because of the dress she wore in her first role. She then began a brilliant career in Rio de Janeiro, playing, in spite of her small stature, drag roles, soubrettes, and ladies of the night. She made an impact in plays such as Os Velhos ("The Old Ones"), Avô ("Grandfather"), Pranto de Maria Parda ("Maria Parda's Tears"), and The Lady of the Camellias in which she had widespread success.

== Silent films ==
In 1930 she played Aunt Aurélia in the Portuguese silent film, Maria do Mar, directed by José Leitão de Barros. In Portugal she worked under Amélia Rey Colaço alongside actors such as Eunice Muñoz and Estêvão Amarante.

== Family ==
She married Luís Ruas, owner of the Teatro do Príncipe Real, and was the mother of actors Luís Ruas and Aura Abranches; the latter published her mother's memoirs in 1947.

== Distinctions ==
=== National orders ===
- Officer of the Order of Saint James of the Sword (5 October 1928)
