= Júlio Dinis =

Portuguese medical doctor and poet, playwright (1839–1871)

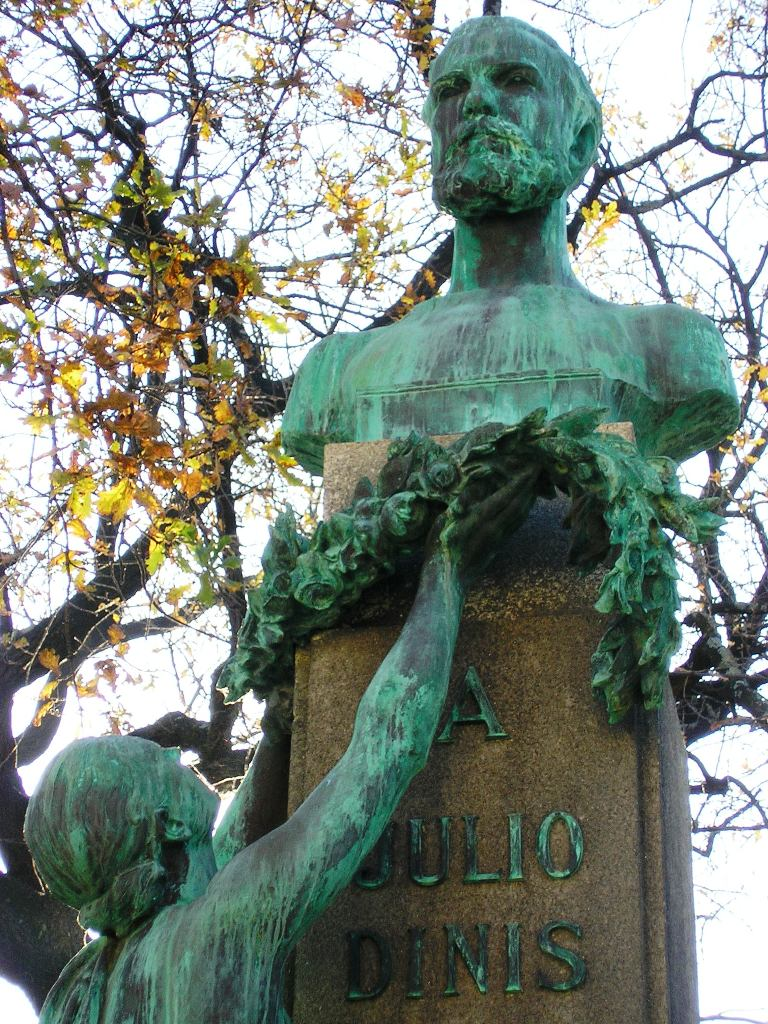
- Monument to Júlio Dinis in Porto.
- Born: 14 November 1839; Porto, Portugal
- Died: 12 September 1871 (aged 31); Porto, Portugal
- Occupation: Writer

Júlio Dinis, pseudonym of Joaquim Guilherme Gomes Coelho (14 November 1839 – 12 September 1871) was a Portuguese medical doctor and poet, playwright and novelist. He was the first great novelist of modern Portuguese middle-class society. His novels, extremely popular in his lifetime and still widely read in Portugal today, are written in a simple and direct style accessible to a large public.

His first attacks of tuberculosis forced him to resign as deputy professor at the medical school of Porto. He had already published several tales of country life in the Jornal do Porto. Retiring to the coastal town of Ovar for his health, he wrote the novel for which he is best known, As Pupilas do Senhor Reitor (1867; "The Dean's Pupils"), depicting country life and scenery in a simple and appealing style. It was based on his own family situation and described the influence of the English on Portuguese culture. (His mother was of English descent.) Encouraged by its immediate success, he published Uma Família Inglesa (1868; "An English Family"), a novel describing English society in Porto.

Júlio Dinis died at the young age of 31 of tuberculosis, and some of his works including his poems and plays were published posthumously. He is best-remembered for his novels: As Pupilas do Senhor Reitor had gone through 14 editions by 1900. A translation of Uma Família Inglesa by Margaret Jull Costa was published in 2020, the first of his works to be available in English.

== Works ==
=== Novels ===
- As Pupilas do Senhor Reitor (1866-1867)
- Uma Família Inglesa (1867-1868) trans. Margaret Jull Costa, An English Family, Dedalus Books, 2020, ISBN 9781910213834
- A Morgadinha dos Canaviais (1868)
- Serões da Província (1870)
- Os Fidalgos da Casa Mourisca (1871)

=== Other Works ===
- Um Rei Popular (1858) - play
- Um Segredo de Família (1860) - play
- Poesias (1873)
- Inéditos e Dispersos (1910)
- Teatro Inédito (1946–1947)
