= Ângela Pinto =

Portuguese stage actor

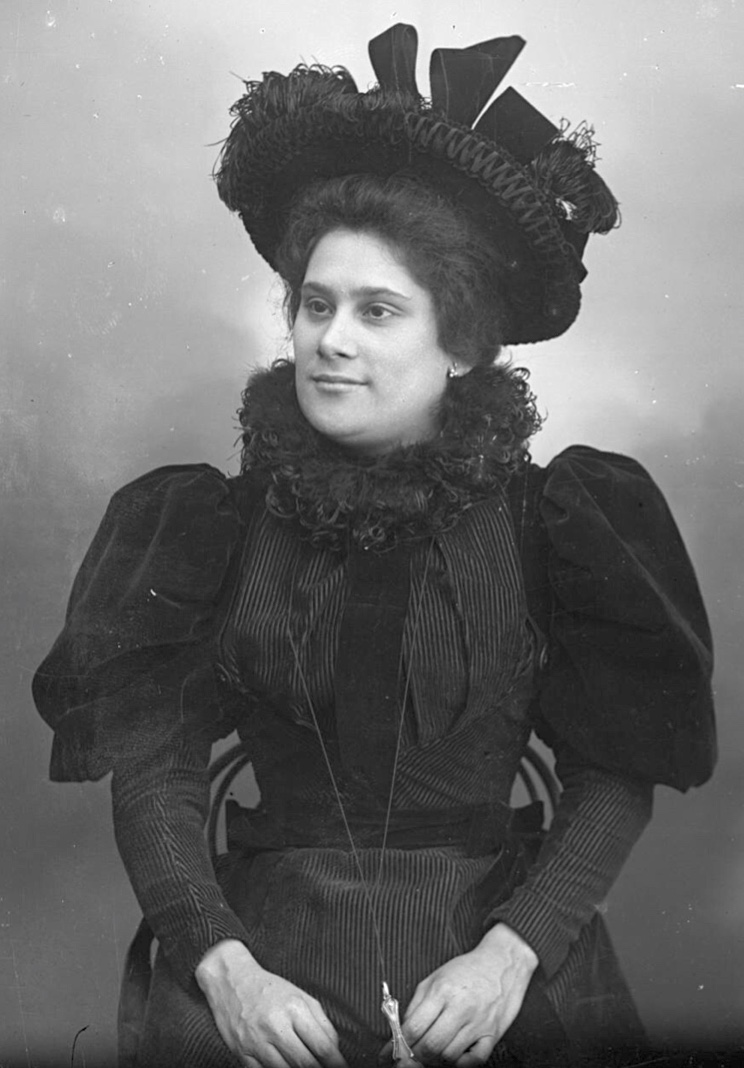
- Born: Ângela Rita Clara de Almeida Pinto; 15 November 1869; Lisbon, Portugal
- Died: 9 March 1925 (aged 55); Lisbon, Portugal
- Resting place: Prazeres Cemetery, Lisbon
- Occupation: Actress
- Years active: 1885–1923

Ângela Rita Clara de Almeida Pinto ComSE (15 November 1869 – 9 March 1925) was a Portuguese actress of the late 19th and early 20th centuries.

== Early life ==
Ângela Rita Clara de Almeida Pinto was born on 15 November 1869, in the parish of Socorro in Lisbon, the capital of Portugal. She was the daughter of Júlia Cândida and João de Almeida Pinto, who was a musician who sometimes worked in theatres, as well as a journalist and one of the owners of O Contemporâneo, a publication dedicated to theatre matters.

From childhood Pinto had become used to meeting writers and translators of plays through her father's work. Her parents were not married at the time of her birth and, in fact, did not get married until 1883. She attended local schools in Lisbon and learned to speak French well. She married in 1887 at a young age and against her will, abandoning her new husband, a nobleman 32 years her senior, on the day of the wedding.

== Acting career ==
Pinto joined the theatre despite her father's opposition. Her first performances were in 1885 in Setúbal. She then went to start her professional career in Porto, returning to Lisbon in 1889 where she had her debut there in October 1889 at the Teatro da Rua dos Condes. In May 1890 she moved to the Teatro do Príncipe Real (later known as the Teatro Apolo) and in October of the same year she returned to Porto, to perform at the Teatro D. Fernando. There she played the role of the transvestite, "Ravolet", in the operetta La jolie parfumeuse by Jacques Offenbach. She returned to the Rua dos Condes in 1892.

In 1898, she was part of the Afonso Taveira company at the Teatro da Trindade, then moving with the same company to Porto. Back in Lisbon in 1900, she played at the Teatro do Ginásio and then the Teatro D. Amélia (later the Teatro da República and now the Teatro São Luiz) with the Rosas & Brazão theatre company. In 1902, she went with Afonso Taveira's company to Brazil. Waiting on the ship for the return voyage to begin she was accosted by the jewellers who had loaned her jewelry for her visit that she had failed to return.

In 1903, Pinto joined the D. Maria II National Theatre, where her roles included that of "Goneril" in William Shakespeare's King Lear. In 1910 she played the male lead in Shakespeare's Hamlet, in which she wore special shoes to increase her height by 3 centimetres. In 1919, she returned to Teatro da Trindade and later moved to the Teatro Nacional de São Carlos. Pinto had a further tour to Brazil in 1919. In her career she performed in the complete range of theatrical genres, from variety and comedy shows and operettas, to dramas and tragedies, amounting to 51 different shows. In 1922, she made her only film, playing the maid "Juliana" in the silent film O Primo Basílio, based on the novel Cousin Bazilio by José Maria de Eça de Queirós.

== Final years ==
In 1923, Ângela Pinto was paralyzed on one side of her body after collapsing on the Teatro Politeama stage, where she was acting with the Rey Colaço-Robles Monteiro theatre company. She never worked again. She was honoured by her colleagues at a benefit performance on 19 November 1923 at the Teatro de São Carlos and, in addition to the revenue from the show, her fellow actors persuaded the government to award her a pension. At the show she was given the Portuguese award of the Military Order of Saint James of the Sword for artistic merit. She died on 9 March 1925. She was buried at the Prazeres Cemetery in Lisbon in Grave Number 1500, belonging to the Mutual Association for Actors.

In her personal life, Pinto had been known as a very kind and charitable person, who was considered one of the bohemians of Lisbon. She had a close relationship with D. Luís do Rego. Some sources suggest that she had two granddaughters. In 1925, shortly after her death, an In Memoriam was published, in which many celebrities from the literary and theatrical world collaborated with sharing their memories of her. An award for dramatic art was established in her name.

Her name is remembered in the toponymy of Almada, Seixal, Setúbal, and Lisbon, where all of the streets in the neighbourhood of the Arroios market were named after actors.
