= Prazeres Cemetery =

Cemetery in Lisbon, Lisbon District, Portugal

Cemitério dos Prazeres
- Interactive map of Cemitério dos Prazeres

Details
- Established: 1833
- Location: Estrela, Lisbon
- Country: Portugal
- Coordinates: 38°42′49″N 9°10′17″W
- Type: Public
- Size: 12 hectares (30 acres)
- Website: Official website

Prazeres Cemetery (Portuguese: Cemitério dos Prazeres) is one of the largest cemeteries in Lisbon, Portugal; it is located in the freguesia (civil parish) of Estrela, in western Lisbon (formerly, within the parish of Prazeres). It is considered to be one of the most beautiful and famous cemeteries in the world. It is home to the Mausoleum of the Dukes of Palmela, the largest mausoleum in Europe.

Prazeres Cemetery is the resting place for many famous personalities, including Prime Ministers and Presidents of Portugal, notable literary figures such as author Fernando Namora, famous artists like painters Columbano Bordalo Pinheiro or Roque Gameiro, prominent musical figures like pianist Alexandre Rey Colaço or composer João Domingos Bomtempo, and numerous other notable burials, especially from the Portuguese nobility.

== History ==
Prazeres Cemetery was founded in 1833 after the outbreak of cholera in the city, along with Alto de São João Cemetery. It was originally named Cemitério Ocidental de Lisboa (Western Cemetery of Lisbon). The cemetery is exclusively made up of mausoleums.

Since 2001, a portion of the cemetery's auxiliary buildings have been converted into a museum.

Amália Rodrigues, famous as the "Queen of Fado", and Aquilino Ribeiro, famed novelist, were both buried at Prazeres Cemetery prior to their reinterment at the National Pantheon. Famed poet Fernando Pessoa was also buried at Prazeres prior to his reinterment at Jerónimos Monastery.

== Gallery ==
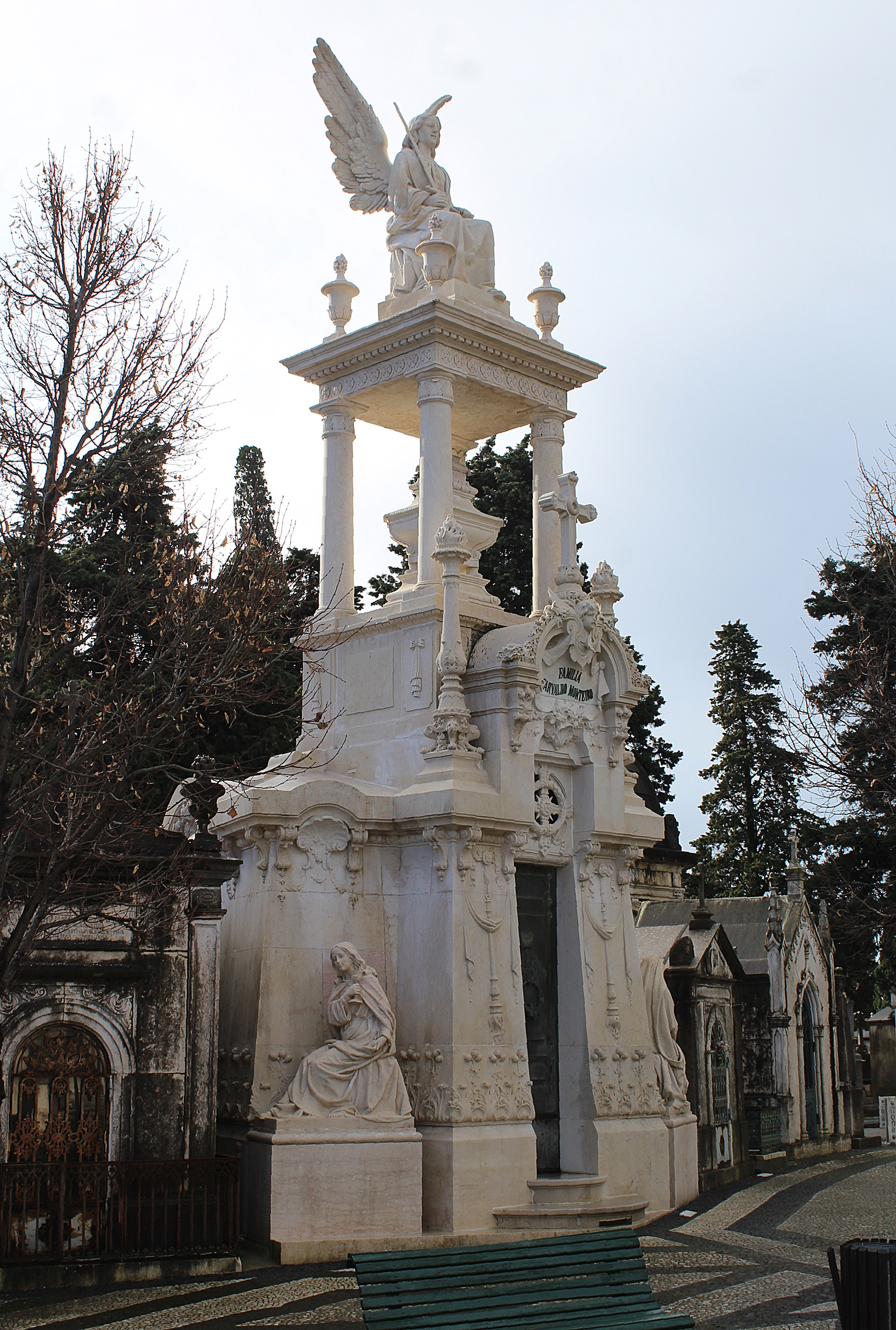
Carvalho Monteiro mausoleum

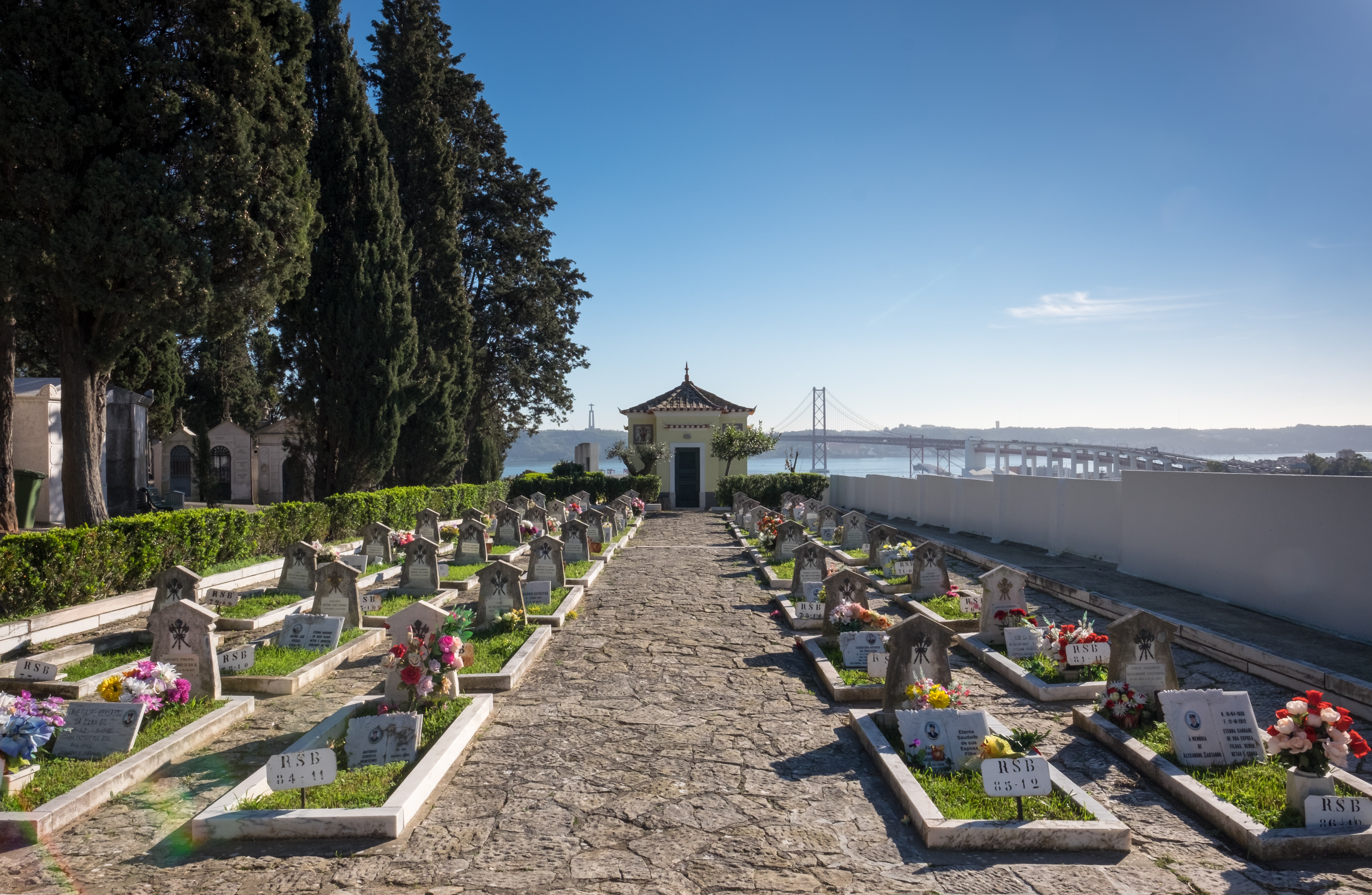
Firefighters burial ground

Pinto Leite chapel

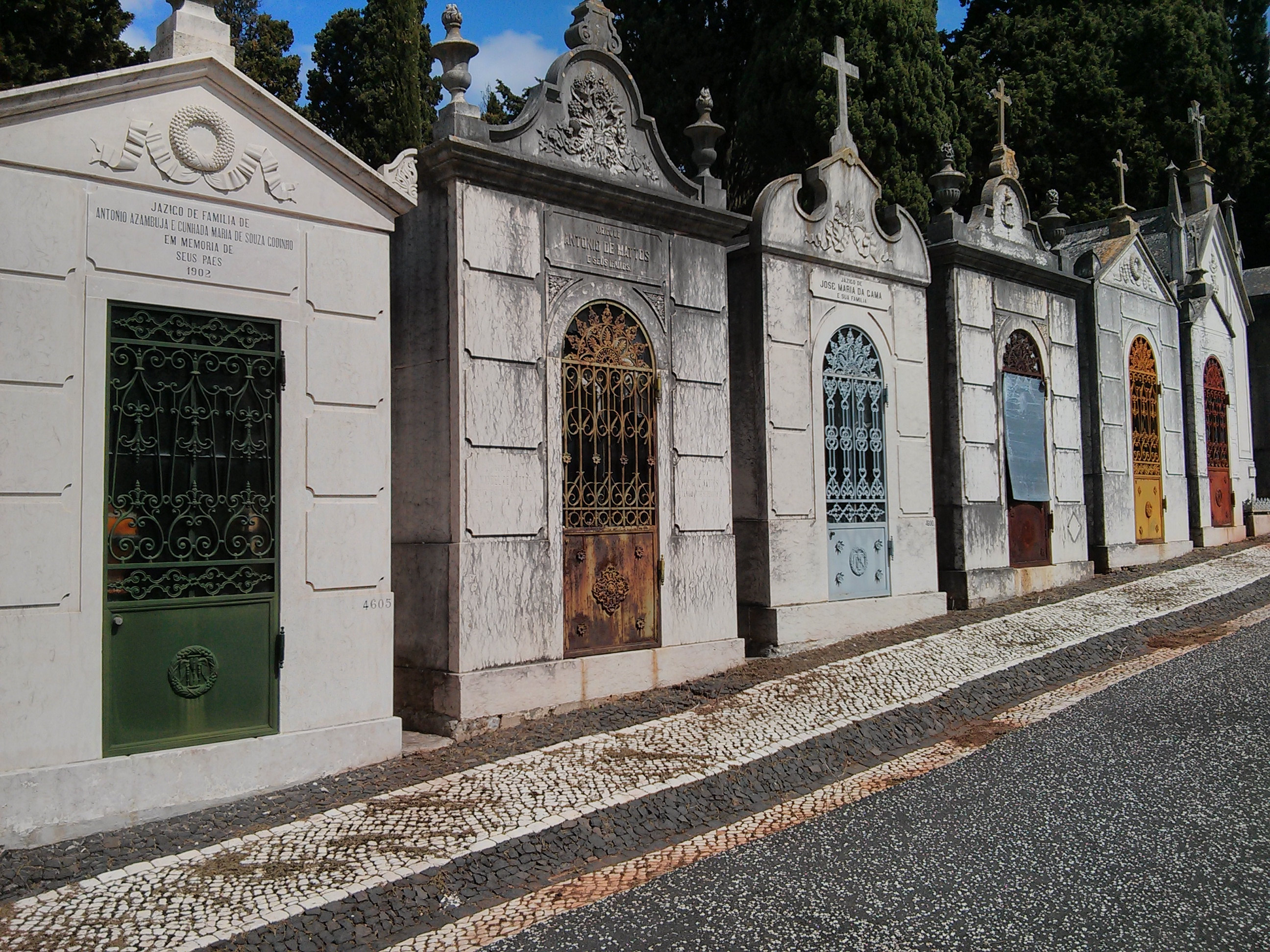
Row of mausoleums

Marquis of Vale Flor mausoleum

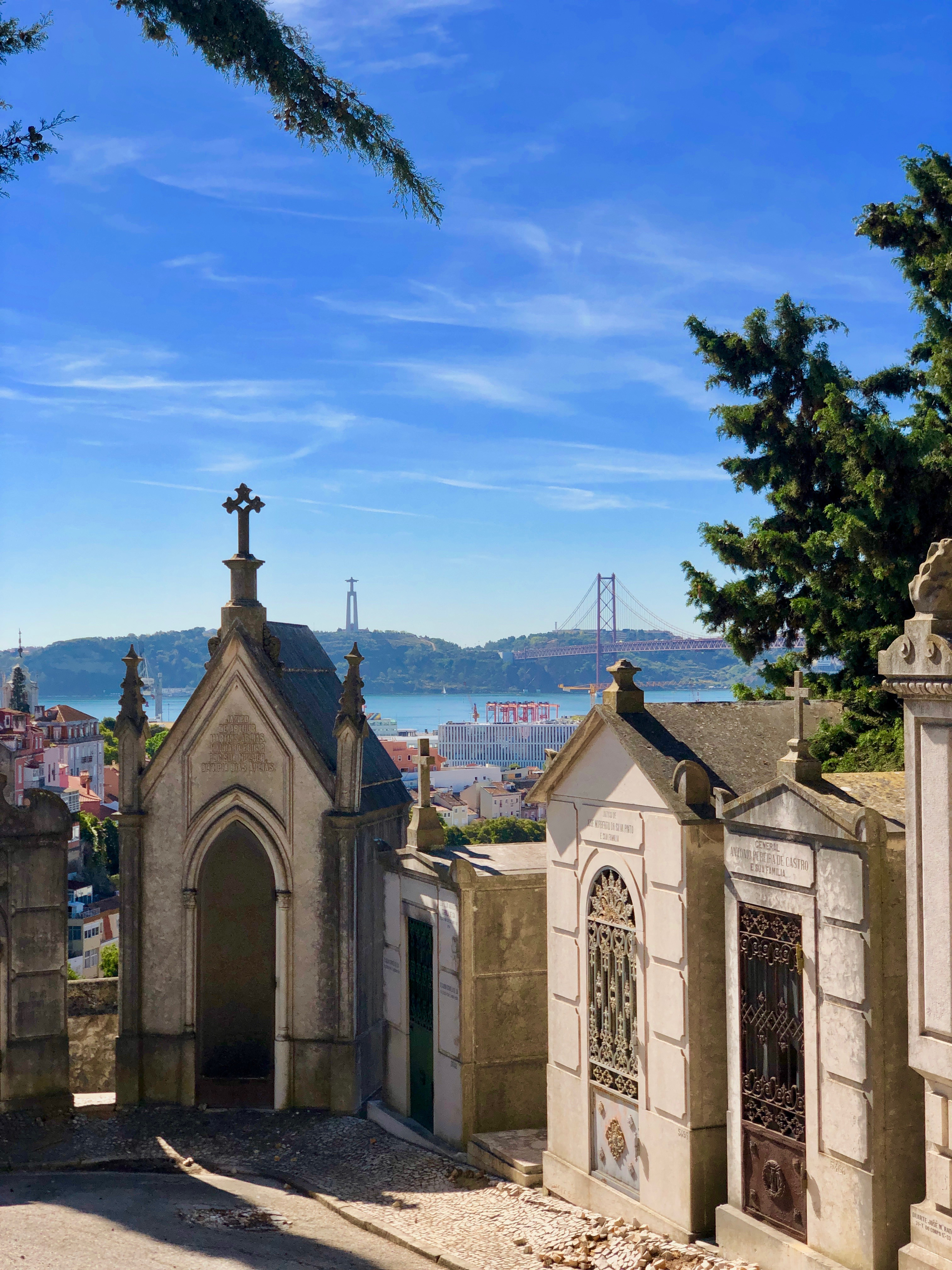
View of the Tagus River

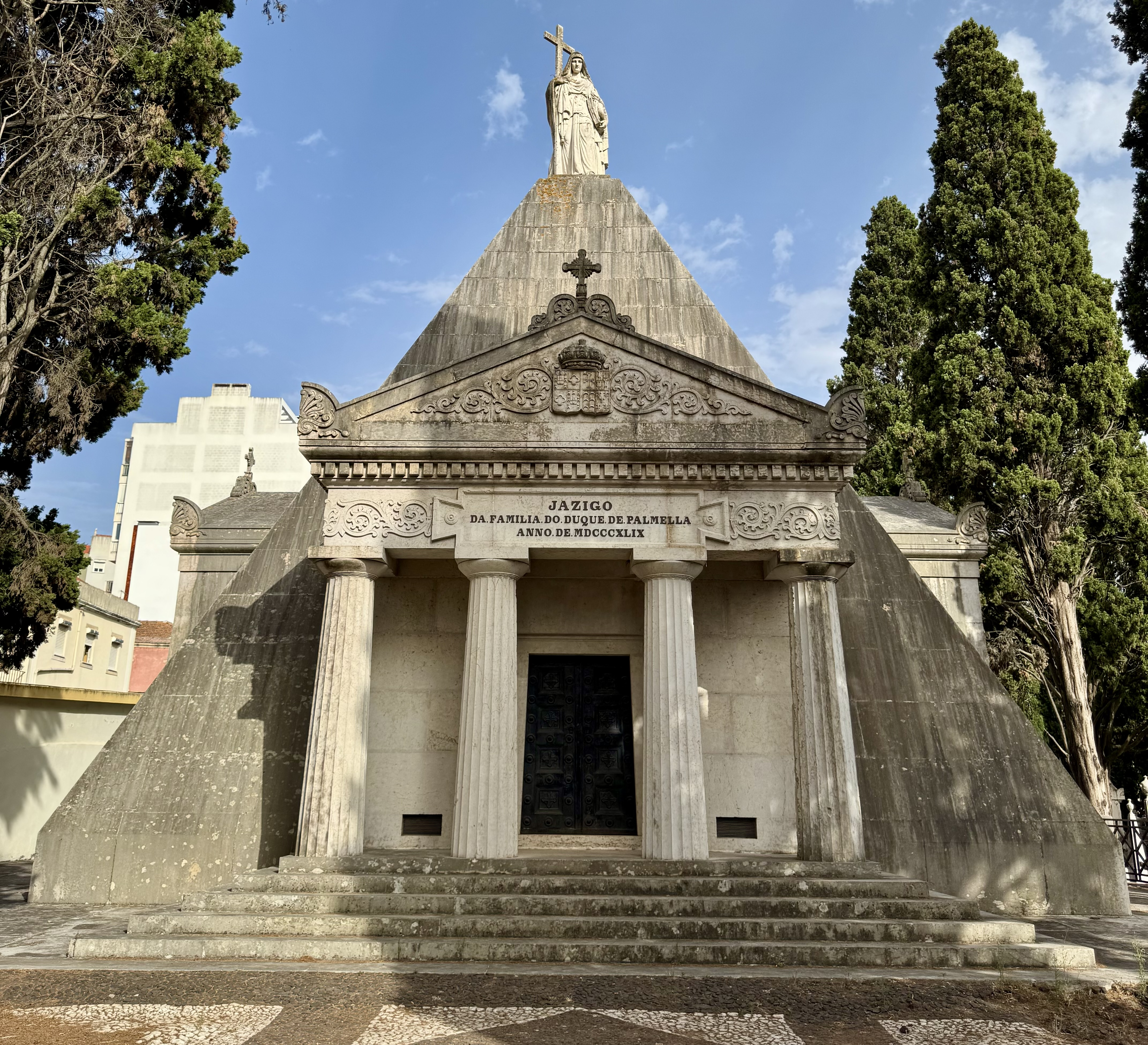
Mausoleum of the Dukes of Palmela

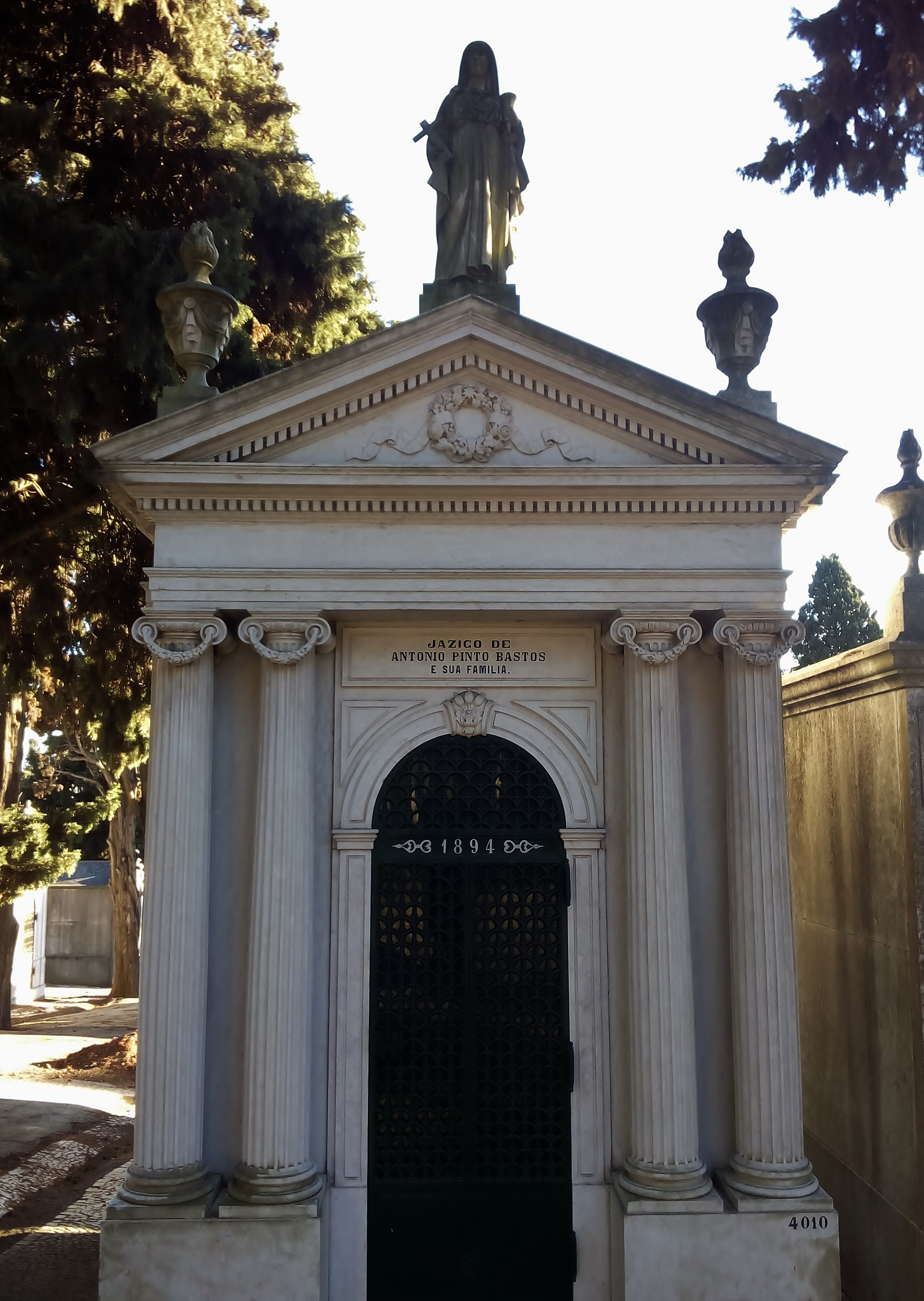
Viscount of Mira Vouga mausoleum

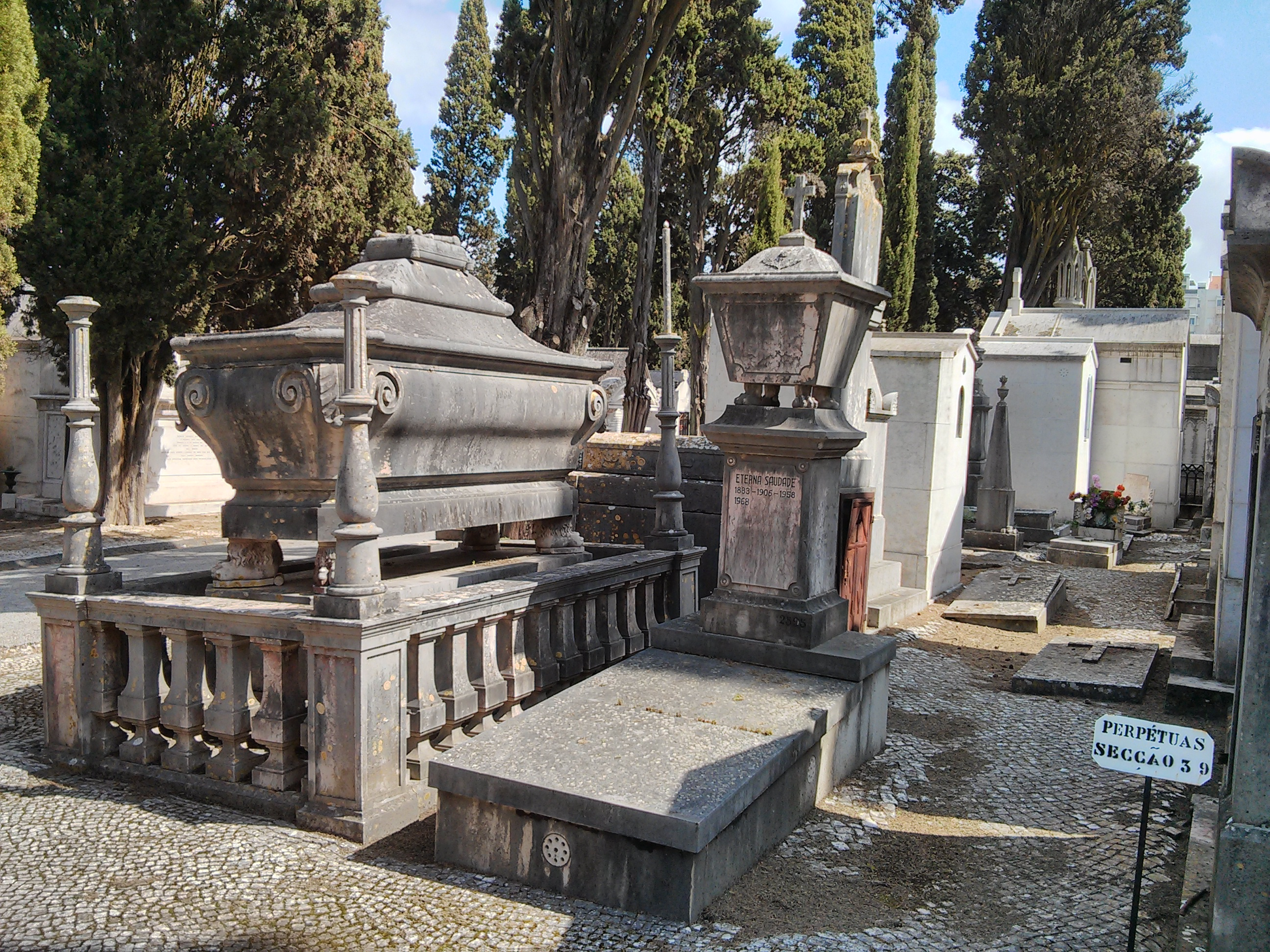
Mausoleums in Section III

Mausoleums with the 25 de Abril Bridge in the background

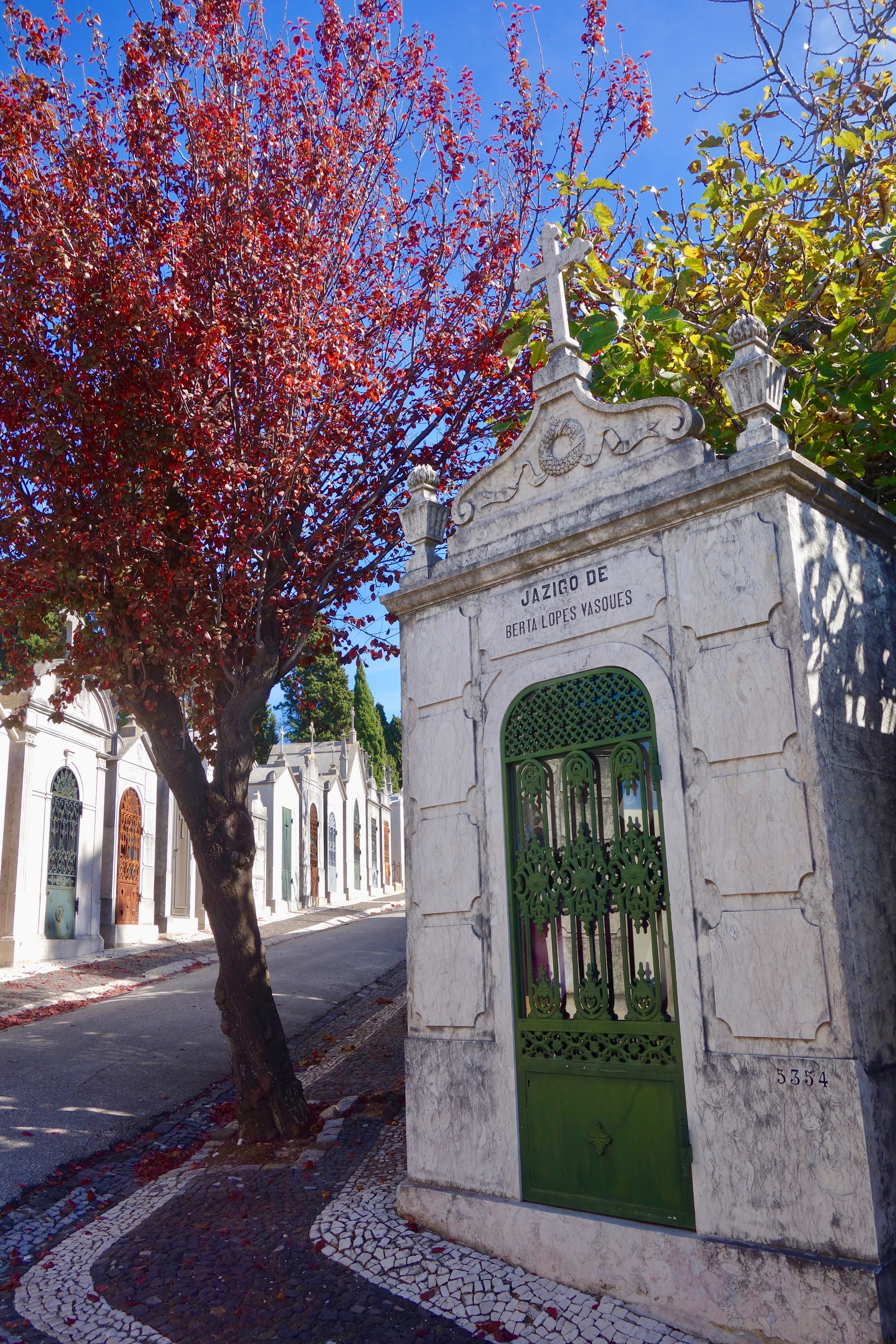
Lopes Vasques Mausoleum

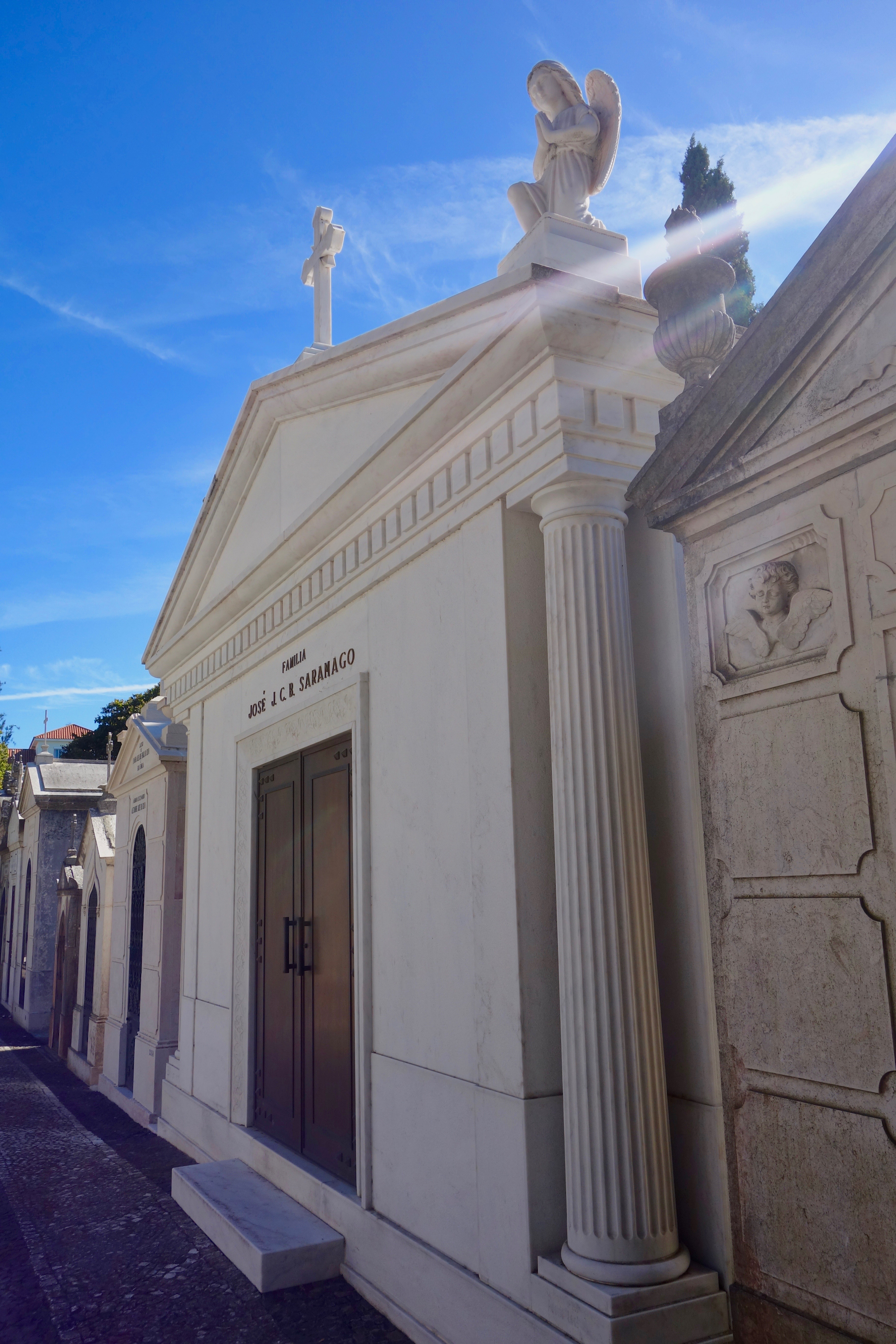
Saramago Family mausoleum

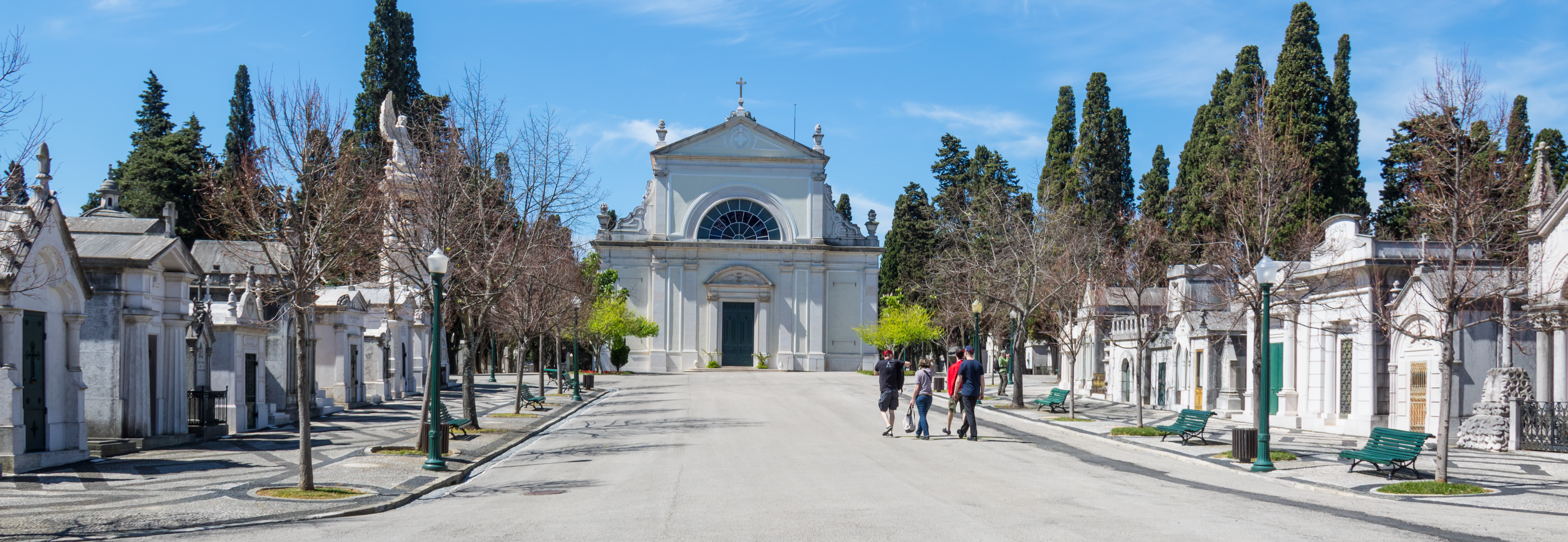
Cemetery church plaza

== Notable burials ==
- 1st Count of Bonfim, famed statesman
- 1st Count of Farrobo, noted patron of the arts
- 1st Count of São Januário, founder of the Lisbon Geographic Society
- 1st Duke of Loulé, 21st & 24th Prime Minister of Portugal
- 1st Duke of Palmela, 1st Prime Minister of Portugal
- 1st Viscount of Castilho, noted writer
- "Alcipe", 4th Marquise of Alorna, noted poet
- Alexandre de Serpa Pinto, notable explorer
- Alexandre Rey Colaço, famed pianist
- Alfredo Keil, composer of the Portuguese national anthem
- Alfredo Marceneiro, notable fado singer
- Alfredo Roque Gameiro, famed artist
- Amélia Rey Colaço, famed actress
- Almada Negreiros, famous artist
- Anselmo José Braamcamp, 36th Prime Minister of Portugal
- António Augusto Carvalho Monteiro, 20th-c. Brazilian millionaire
- António Silva, famed actor
- Antonio Tabucchi, famed Italian author
- Carlos do Carmo, notable fado singer
- Carlos Paredes, Portuguese guitar player
- Carolina Beatriz Ângelo, famed physician and suffragette
- Cesário Verde, famed poet
- Columbano Bordalo Pinheiro, famous painter
- Cosme Damião, founder of S.L. Benfica
- Cottinelli Telmo, famed architect
- Curry Cabral, famed physician
- Elise, Countess of Edla, second wife of Ferdinand II of Portugal
- Fernando Namora, famed writer
- Fontes Pereira de Melo, 33rd & 35th Prime Minister of Portugal
- Francisco Craveiro Lopes, 12th President of Portugal
- Henrique Mitchell de Paiva Couceiro, noted monarchist
- Hermenegildo Capelo, famed general
- João do Canto e Castro, 5th President of Portugal
- João Domingos Bomtempo, famous classical piano composer
- Joaquim Mouzinho de Albuquerque, famous general
- Joly Braga Santos, famed composer and conductor
- José Malhoa, famous painter
- José Mendes Cabeçadas, 9th President of Portugal
- José Norton de Matos, famous general
- José Vianna da Motta, famed pianist and composer
- Manuel Carvalheiro, filmmaker and film theorist
- Maria Amália Vaz de Carvalho, famed poet
- Maria Barroso, 25th First Lady of Portugal
- Maria de Lourdes Pintasilgo, 108th Prime Minister of Portugal
- Mário Cesariny de Vasconcelos, famed poet
- Mário Soares, 25th President of Portugal
- Rafael Bordalo Pinheiro, famed artist
