= Triana =

Triana may refer to:

== People ==
- Andreya Triana, British singer-songwriter
- Jorge Alí Triana (born 1942), Colombian theatre and film director
- José Jerónimo Triana (1828–1890), Colombian botanist
- José Triana (athlete) (born 1935), Cuban sprinter
- José Triana (poet) (1931–2018), Cuban poet and playwright
- Juan de Triana (fl. 1460 to 1500), Spanish composer of the Renaissance period
- Raúl González Triana (born 1968), Cuba national football team head coach
- Rodrigo de Triana (1469–?), shipmate of Christopher Columbus
- Triana Iglesias (born 1982), Norwegian model and burlesque artist
- Triana Parera (1988), Mexican visual artist, graphic designer and illustrator

== Places ==
- Triana, Alabama, a town, United States
- Triana (Alenquer), a parish in the municipality of Alenquer, Portugal
- Triana, Tuscany, a village, Italy
- Triana, Seville, a large neighborhood of Seville, Spain
- Triana (Vélez-Málaga), a subdivision in the municipality of Vélez-Málaga, Spain
- Triana (Las Palmas de Gran Canaria), a subdivision in the municipality of Las Palmas de Gran Canaria, Spain

== Other uses ==
- Triana (band), Spanish musical group
- Triana (satellite), launched in 2015 as the Deep Space Climate Observatory
- Triana (yacht), the home of Melina Havelock in the movie For Your Eyes Only (film)
- Triana Orpheus, fictional character in series The Venture Bros.
- Puente de Isabel II, also called Puente de Triana, a bridge in Seville
- Puerta de Triana, a former wall gate that was in Seville
- USS Triana, the name of more than one United States Navy ship
