= Castle of Alenquer =

Medieval castle in Alenquer, Lisbon, Portugal

- Castelo de Alenquer
- Lisbon, Greater Lisbon, Lisbon in Portugal
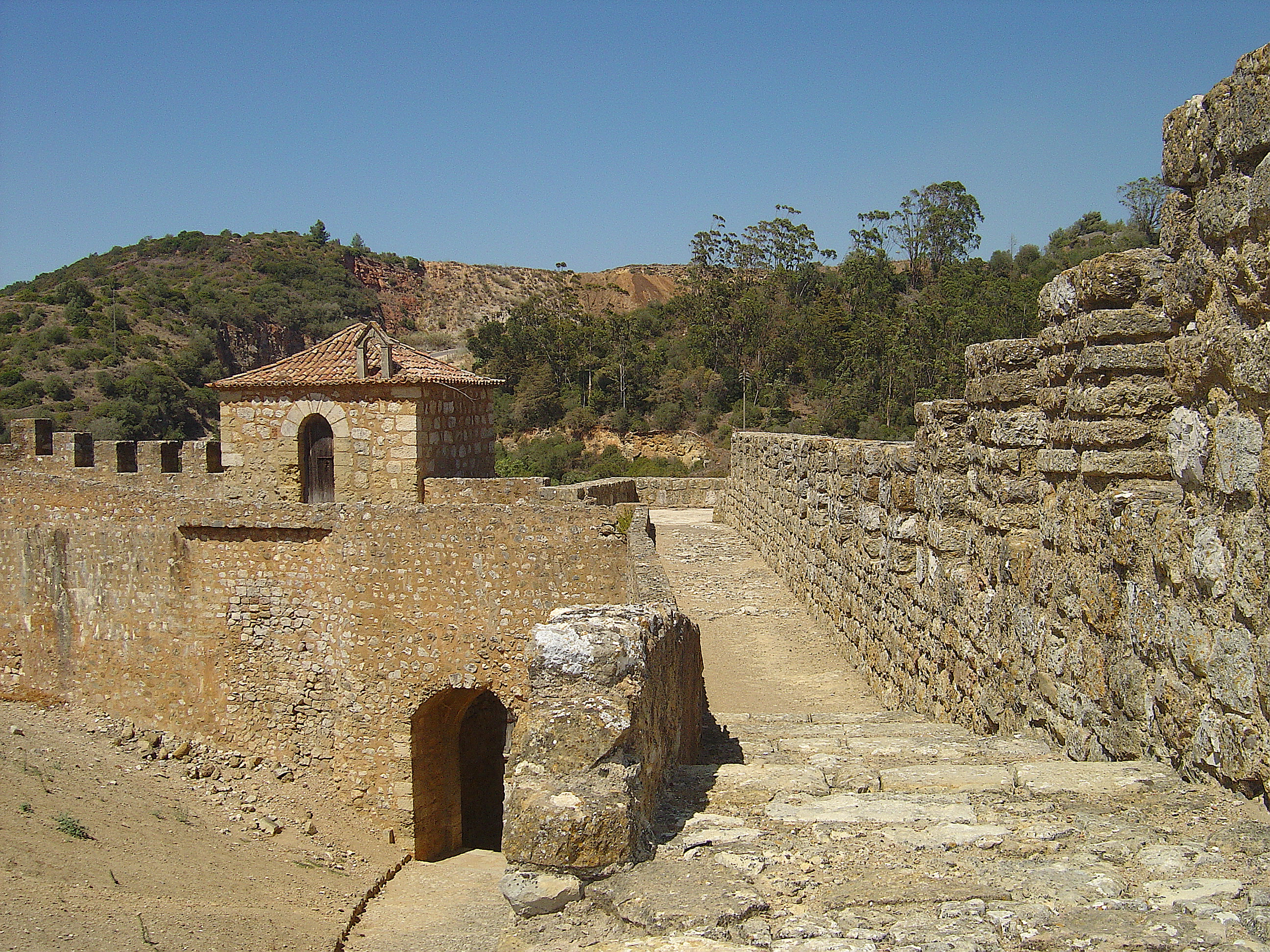
- The walls and small chapel of Nossa Senhora da Conceição at the castle of Alenquer

Site information
- Type: Castle
- Owner: Portuguese Republic
- Open to the public: Public

Location
- Coordinates: 39°3′27″N 9°0′27″W

Site history
- Built: 1160

The Castle of Alenquer (Portuguese: Castelo de Alenquer), is a Portuguese medieval castle in civil parish of Alenquer (Santo Estêvão e Triana), in the municipality of Alenquer, in the district of Lisbon.

== History ==
The territory of "Alan Cana" was conquered in 714 by Muslims, who established a fortress (alcaçova). To the north are two rectangular towers, whose lines demonstrate Muslim influences, but without direct connection to Muslim architecture.

Following two months of siege, D. Afonso Henriques' forces took the fortress and likely began repairs on the fortifications, while settling partisans within the territory.

By the first half of the 13th century, the castle was one of the important defensive structures in the north of Lisbon. In 1211, King D. Sancho I constructed a royal palace and donated it to his daughter, Sancha, who would eventually take refuge there following a disagreement with her brother, the Infante D. Afonso II (who disagreed with their fathers gifting of the castle). She officially began living in Alenquer beginning in 1212, at which time D. Afonso II encircled the castle. In order to resolve the dispute between the siblings, Pope Innocent III placed the castle in charge of the Knights Templar in 1216, proving the military relevance of the structure at that time.

The castle's proprietorship passed in 1340, to D. Constância, wife of King D. Pedro I. At the beginning of this period, Alenquer began to be an integral part of the patrimony of the Portuguese Queens, being successively donated to sovereigns of the Kingdom. The work to build the structure were primarily instigated in the 14th century, by Queen Isabel when she began visiting the village. The majority of artefacts from the castle's construction indicate a chronological distinction during this Gothic period. The oval plan and keep tower addorsed to the walls were highlights of this style. The walls were covered by protected embattlements with rectangular merlons, and near the river, constructed as a defensive link to water resources was the "Torre da Couraça". It is likely that these 18 metres (59 ft) high structures were later to the castle and highly modified within the progressing years.

In 1384, Castilian forces take Alenquer, forcing the Master of Aviz, John I of Castile to lay siege to the fortress. After a period, the alcalde, Vasco Pires de Camões surrendered the fortifications, but as a reprisal for the former-alcalde's conspiracy against him, he ordered the removal of the cornerstones of the keep tower and lowered the walls.

It was only by 1439 that, continuing in the possession of the Queens of Portugal, D. Leonor Teles ordered that the walls be raised. Sometime around 1578, the castle cistern fell into ruin.

Following the allegiance shown by the town of Alenquer to D. António, Prior of Crato, in his struggle to maintain the Portuguese throne, little support was given to maintain the castle. Falling into ruin, the population began using the stones from the wall to fabricate their own homes.

In 1740, though, a small chapel was constructed over the Nossa Senhora da Conceição Gate. Ten years later, the Royal Academy and King Joseph I of Portugal recommended the conservation of the military grounds. But, these efforts were in vain: in 1755, the Lisbon earthquake caused the destruction of the two tower gates.

Similarly, following the Battle of Buçaco in 1810, the castle suffered damage, due to the garrisoning of troops associated with the Lines of Torres Vedras.

In the 19th century, the need to open a gateway between the Nossa Senhora da Conceição Gate and square, obliged the municipal authority to destroy part of the lower wall.

In 1927, archaeologist Hipólito Cabaço, proceed with clearing of the cistern, and recovered objects that permitted dating of the structure. Similar excavations in 1940 alongside the Nossa Senhora da Conceição Gate allowed archeologists to prove the existence of a prehistoric settlement on the site. As part of the archeological recovery of the site, the DGMEN demolished the chapel over the Gate, and proceeded to partially restore the walls, but the project was incomplete, and it remained unfinished.

== Architecture ==
The castle is situated in the urban centre, over the remains of the primitive Muslim fortress, at the highest point of the town surrounded by forest. Alongside the former Jewish quarter, the castle walls encircle the urban area to the Nossa Senhora da Conceição Gate and the corridor towers. The interior is marked by a spring/fountain. Little remains of the primitive fortress except some walls.

The castle has a long, irregular plan that follows the morphology of the terrain and by the urban organization, in addition to the rest of primitive fortress. Of its original fortifications, only the northwest perimeter exists, in addition to a segment in the north and around the tower. The curtain of walls to the north includes three rectangular towers, with two arched doorways. The left tower, with strong lower backstop, along with the one in the northeast, are surmounted by terrace and parapets, and the right by rectangular construction with tile roof and small belfry.

The Gothic castle in Alenquer was organized into two enclosures: an upper courtyard, that conformed to the topography of the terrain, where the Muslim alcáova existed; and the inferior terrace that covered a much wider area, that protected the primitive urban agglomeration. Of the various stages of development little is known. It is presumed that the first structure was the Muslim fortification and settlement, and that after it was conquered in 1148, a new wave building began, such as in Lisbon, Sintra, Almada and Palmela at the time.

The castle fortifications are accessible by arched doorway. The curtain of walls are crowned by rectangular merlons and lined by battlements, in some areas protected by parapets.

The main rectangular tower extends 18.60 metres (61.0 ft) above the river, connected by a corridor to defend the walls. Both structures were reused for housing, and the walls incorporated into local constructions.
