= Alenquer =

Alenquer may refer to:

- Alenquer, Portugal, municipality
  - Alenquer (Santo Estêvão e Triana), a civil parish within Alenquer, Portugal
- Alenquer, Pará, a municipality in the Brazilian state of Pará
- Alenquer DOC, a Portuguese wine region
- Alenquer (horse), Thoroughbred racehorse
