= Aldeia Galega =

Aldeia Galega may refer to:

- Aldeia Galega da Merceana, a former civil parish in Portugal
- Aldeia Galega da Merceana e Aldeia Gavinha, a civil parish in Portugal
- Montijo, Portugal, formerly known as Aldeia Galega do Ribatejo or Aldeia Galega
