= Santo Estêvão (Alenquer) =

- Civil parish
- Location in Portugal
- Coordinates: 39°02′N 9°00′W
- Country: Portugal
- Region: Oeste e Vale do Tejo
- Intermunic. comm.: Oeste
- District: Lisbon
- Municipality: Alenquer

Area
  - Total: 16.09 km^{2} (6.21 sq mi)

Population (2001)
  - Total: 5,338
  - Density: 331.8/km^{2} (859.3/sq mi)
- Time zone: UTC+00:00 (WET)
  - Summer (DST): UTC+01:00 (WEST)

Santo Estêvão (Portuguese pronunciation: [ˈsɐ̃tu ɨʃˈtevɐ̃w]) is a former civil parish, located in the municipality of Alenquer, in western Portugal. In 2013, the parish merged into the new parish Alenquer (Santo Estêvão e Triana). It covers 16.09 km² in area, with 5338 inhabitants as of 2001. It was extinguished (aggregated) in 2013 as part of a national administrative reform, having been added to the parish of Triana to form a new parish called União das Freguesias de Alenquer (Santo Estêvão e Triana), of which it was the seat.
