= Alto de São João Cemetery =

Cemetery in Lisbon, Portugal

Cemitério do Alto de São João
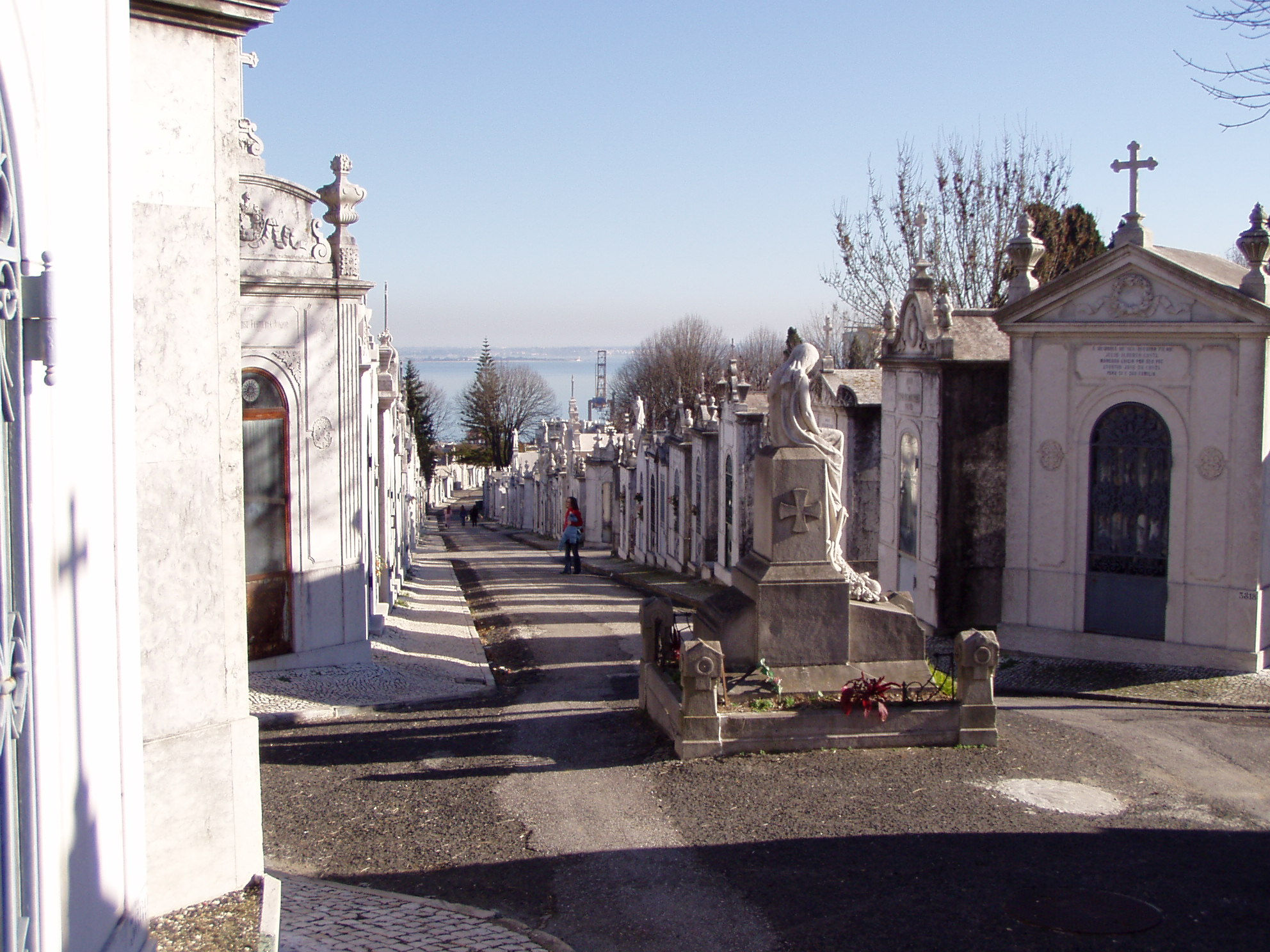
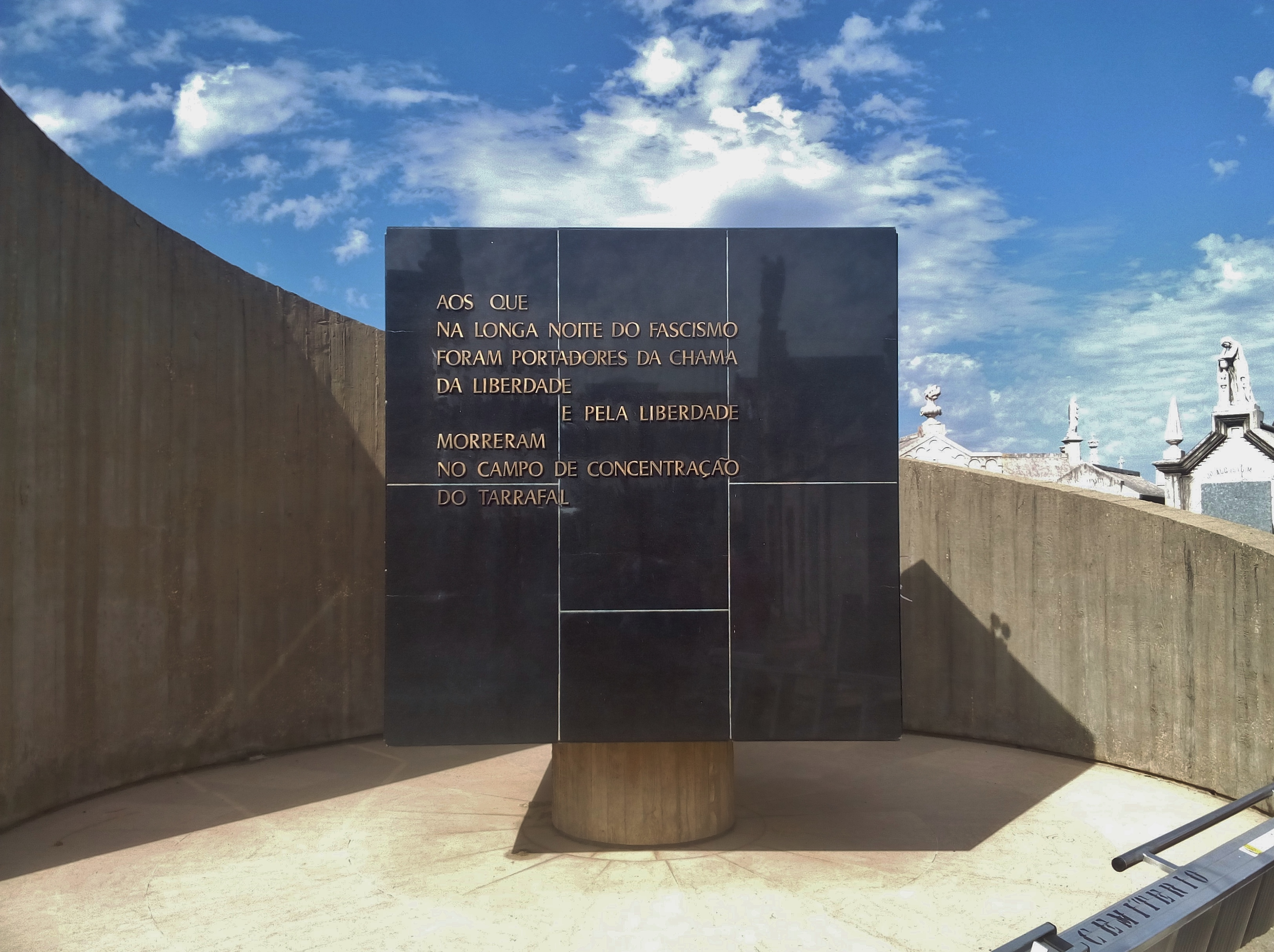
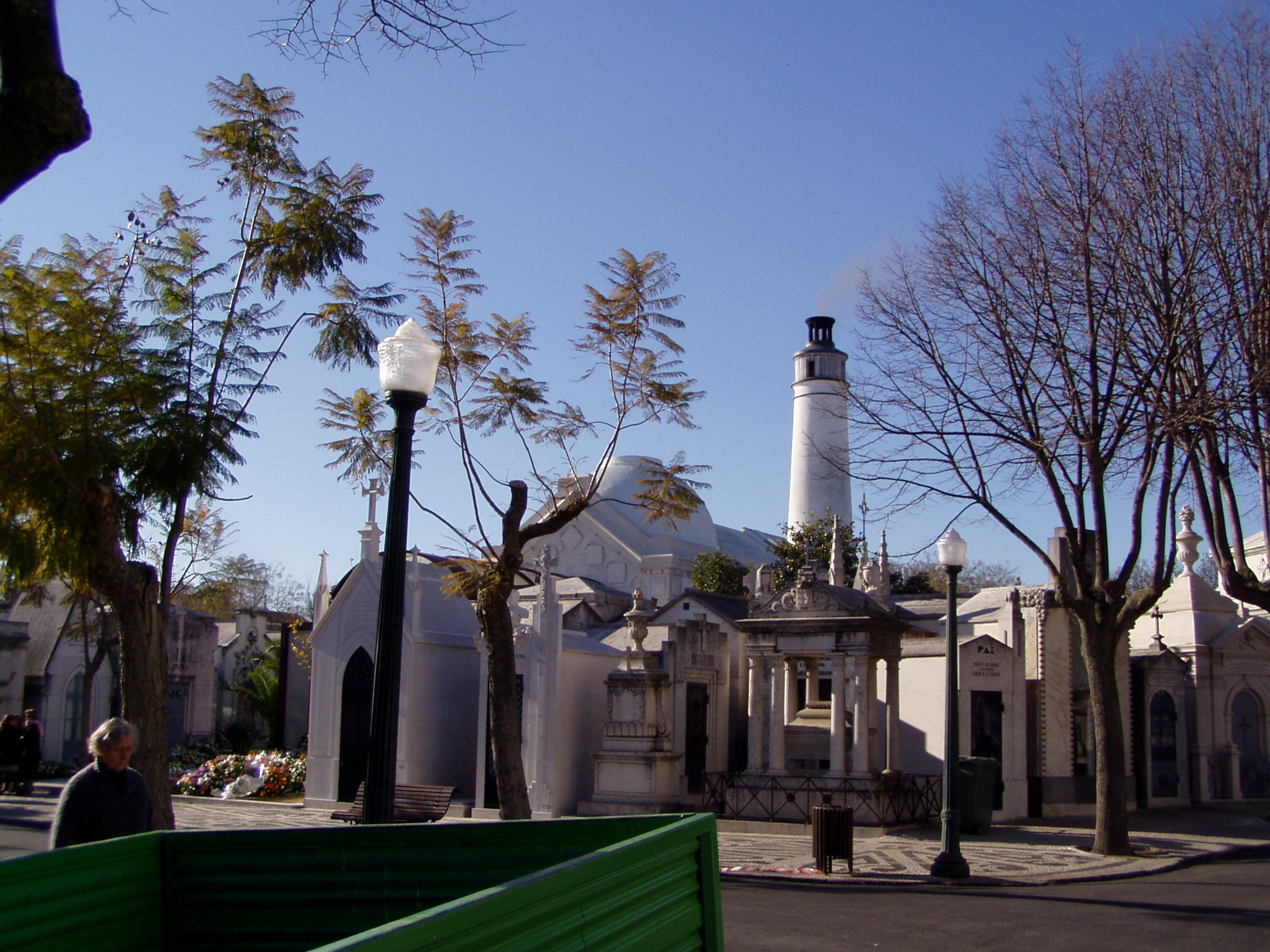
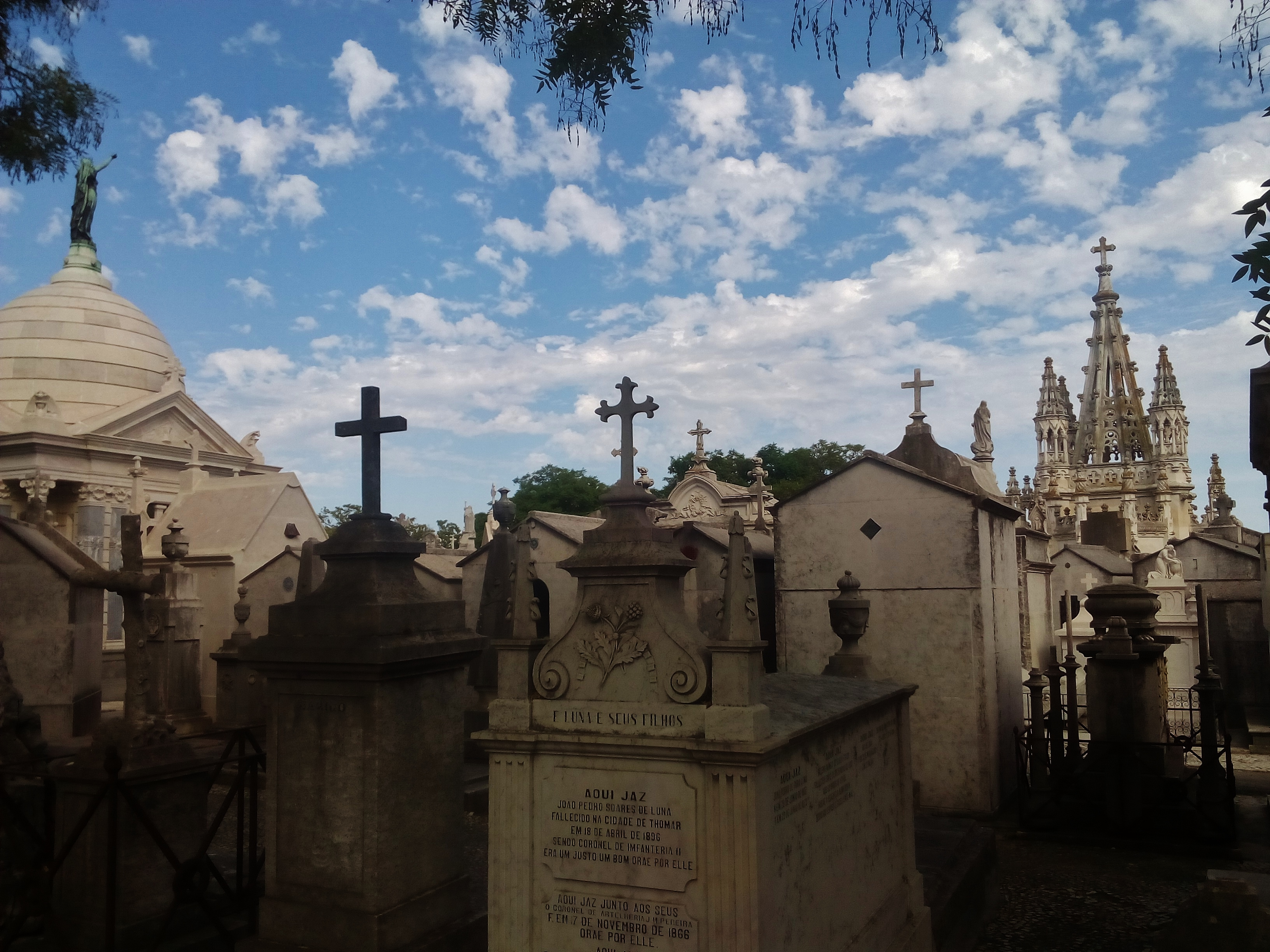
- Interactive map of Cemitério do Alto de São João

Details
- Established: 1833
- Location: Penha de França, Lisbon
- Country: Portugal
- Coordinates: 38.729°N 9.122°W
- Type: Public
- Size: 22 hectares (54 acres)

Alto de São João Cemetery (Portuguese: Cemitério do Alto de São João) is the largest cemetery in Lisbon, Portugal, located in the freguesia (civil parish) of Penha de França, in eastern Lisbon (formerly, within the parish of São João).

Similar to Prazeres Cemetery, it is the resting place for many prominent figures, from literature to the arts, from science to politics, from working class to nobility, side by side with anonymous citizens who are buried and cremated there. The cemetery is public and receives residents from several freguesias in the capital.

The cemetery is composed of mausoleums, temporary and perpetual graves, crypts, ossuaries and columbaria. Also noteworthy are the Crypt of Combatants of the Great War and the Memorial of the Tarrafal concentration camp victims.

== History ==
Alto de São João Cemetery was founded in 1833 after the outbreak of cholera in the city, along with Prazeres Cemetery. It was originally named Cemitério Oriental de Lisboa (Eastern Cemetery of Lisbon).

The country's first crematorium was built here in 1925, but would eventually cease to operate for political and religious reasons in 1936. It only resumed operation in 1985 after pressure from the city's Hindu community. There have already been cremated several public figures such as José Saramago, Nobel Literature laureate and Álvaro Cunhal, anti-fascist politician and minister in the first four provisional governments after the Carnation Revolution.

Famed novelist and diplomat Eça de Queiroz was buried at Alto de São João Cemetery prior to his reinterment in his family mausoleum in Baião Municipality.

== Gallery ==
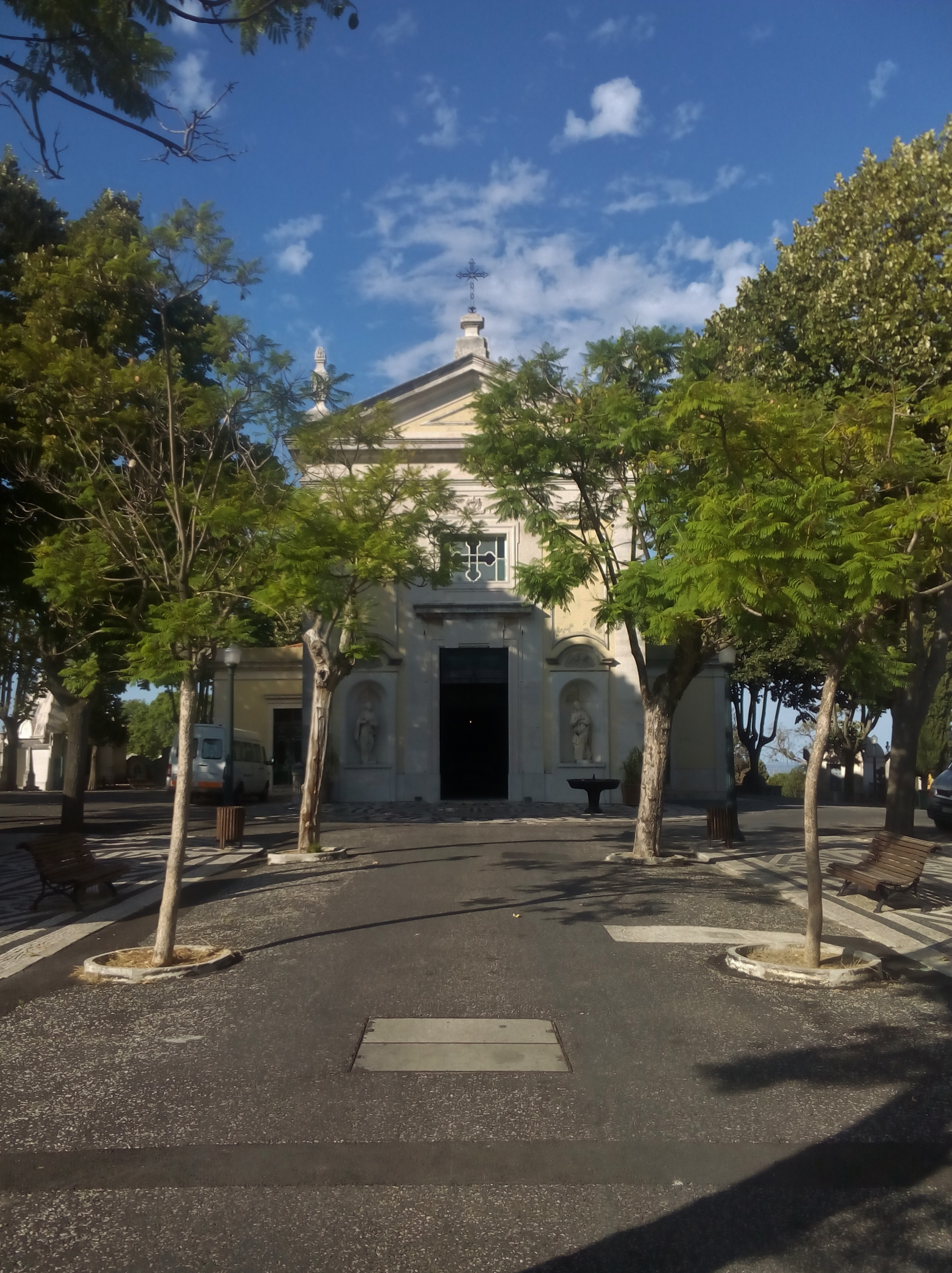
Cemetery church plaza

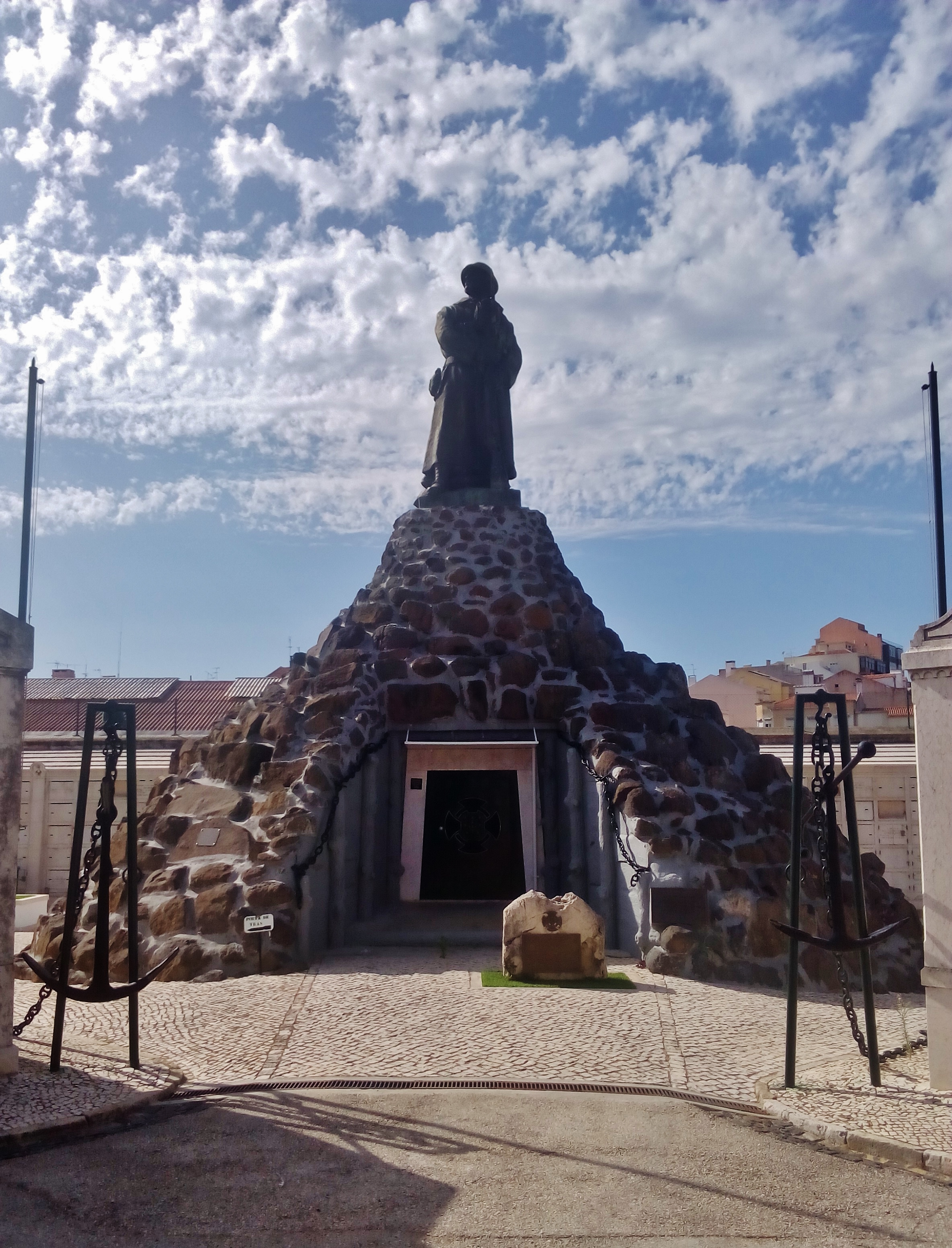
Crypt of Combatants of the Great War

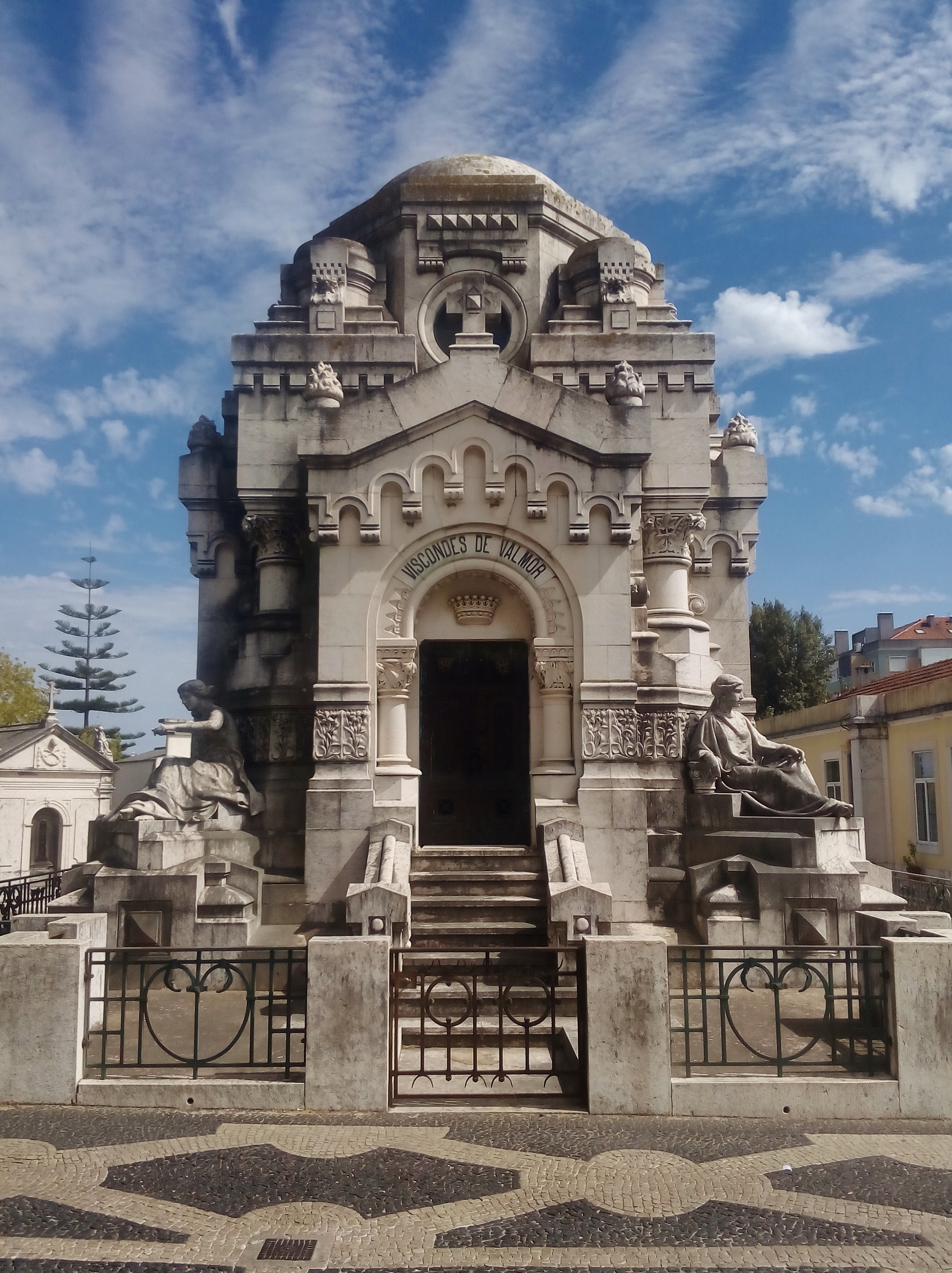
Viscount of Valmor mausoleum

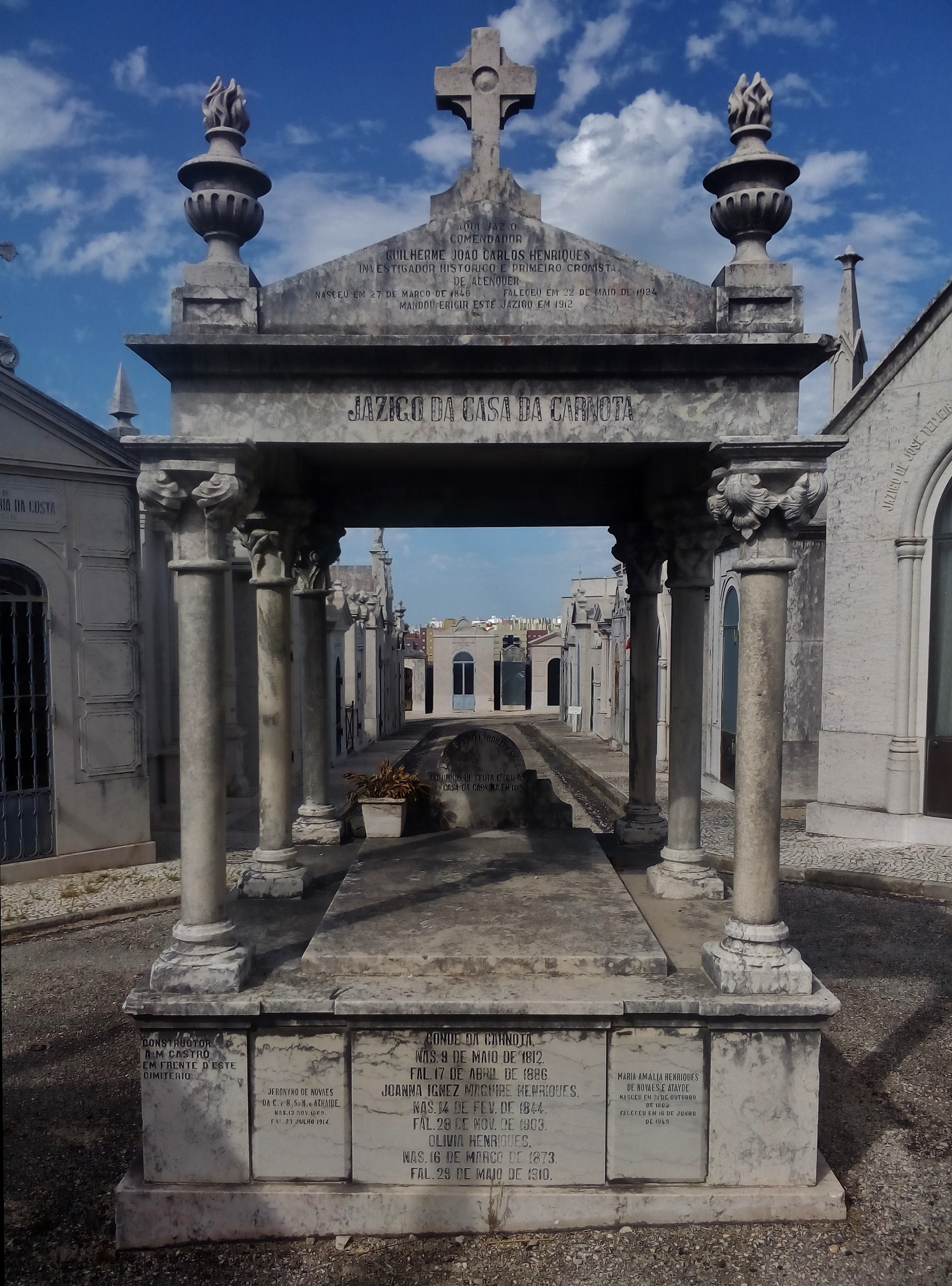
Count of Carnota mausoleum

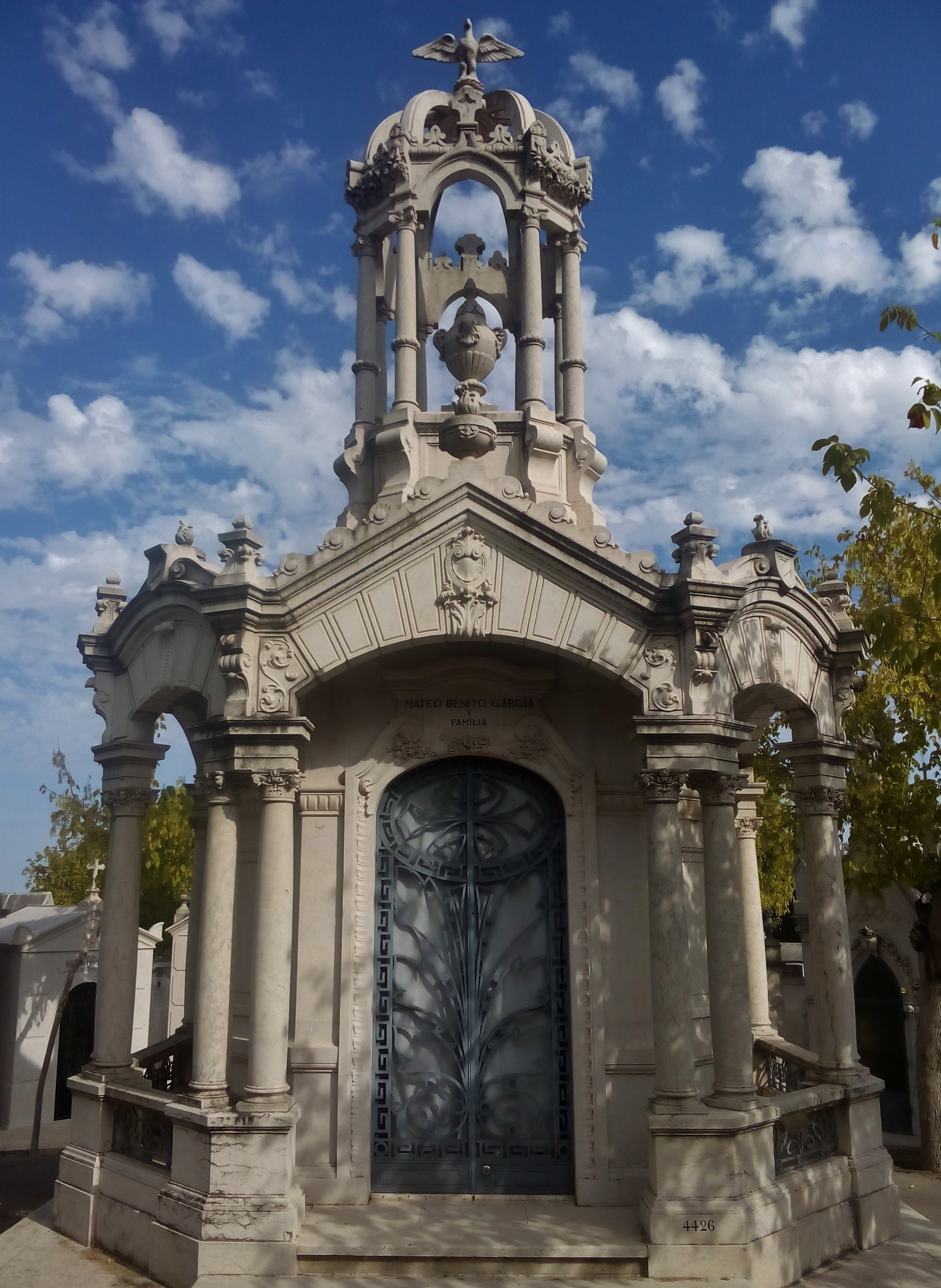
Mateo Benito Garcia mausoleum

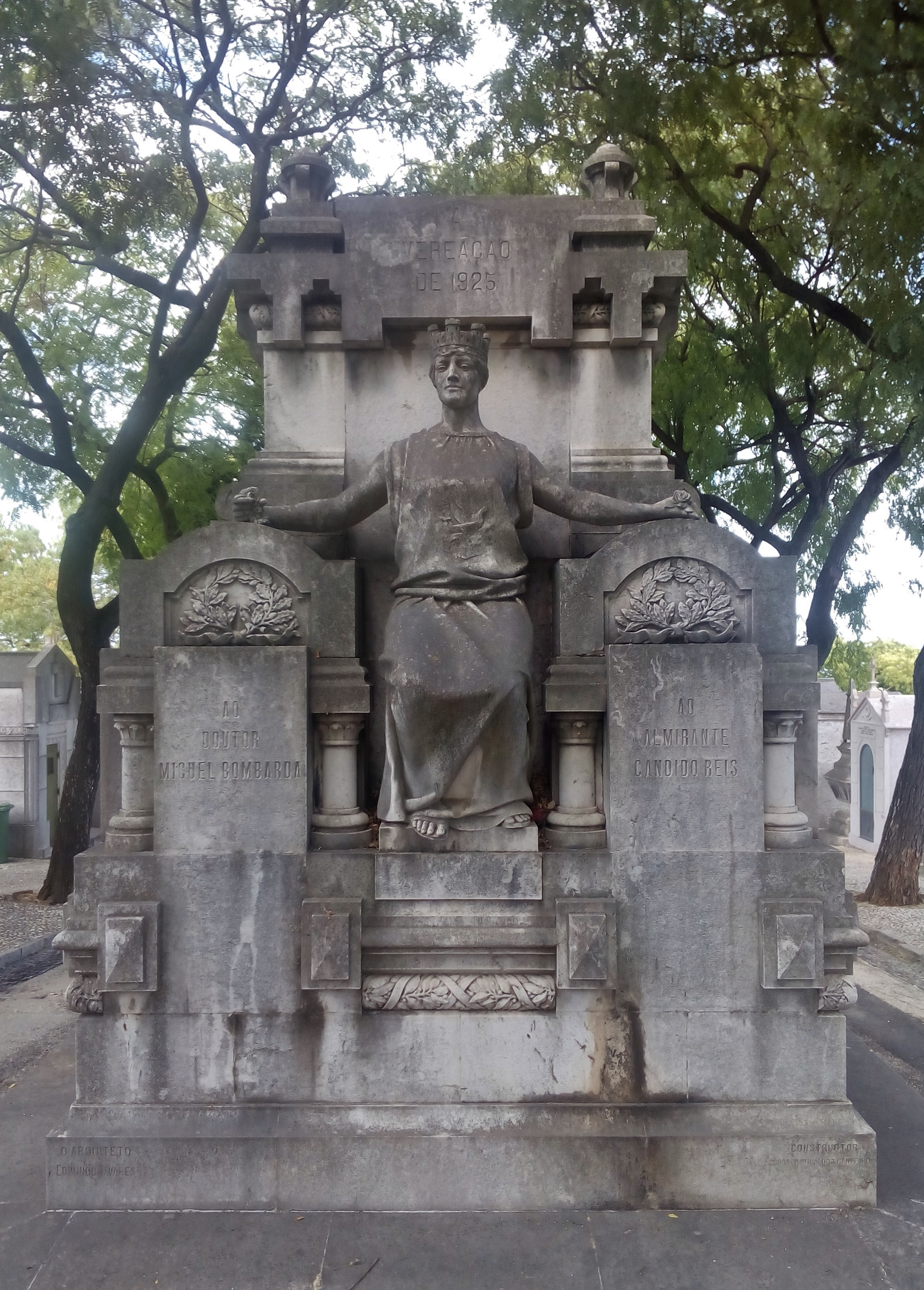
Miguel Bombarda and Cândido dos Reis mausoleum

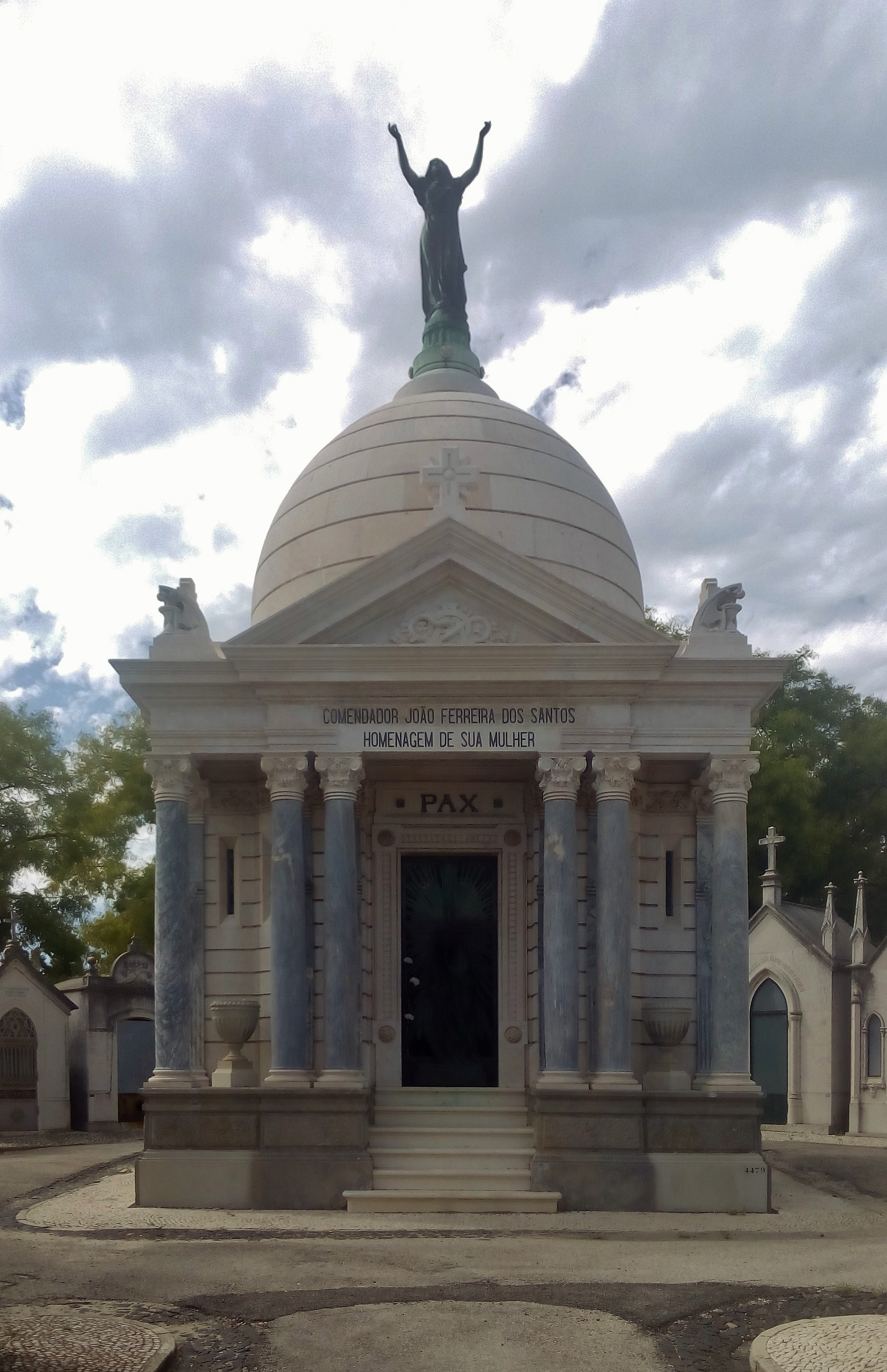
Commander João Ferreira dos Santos mausoleum

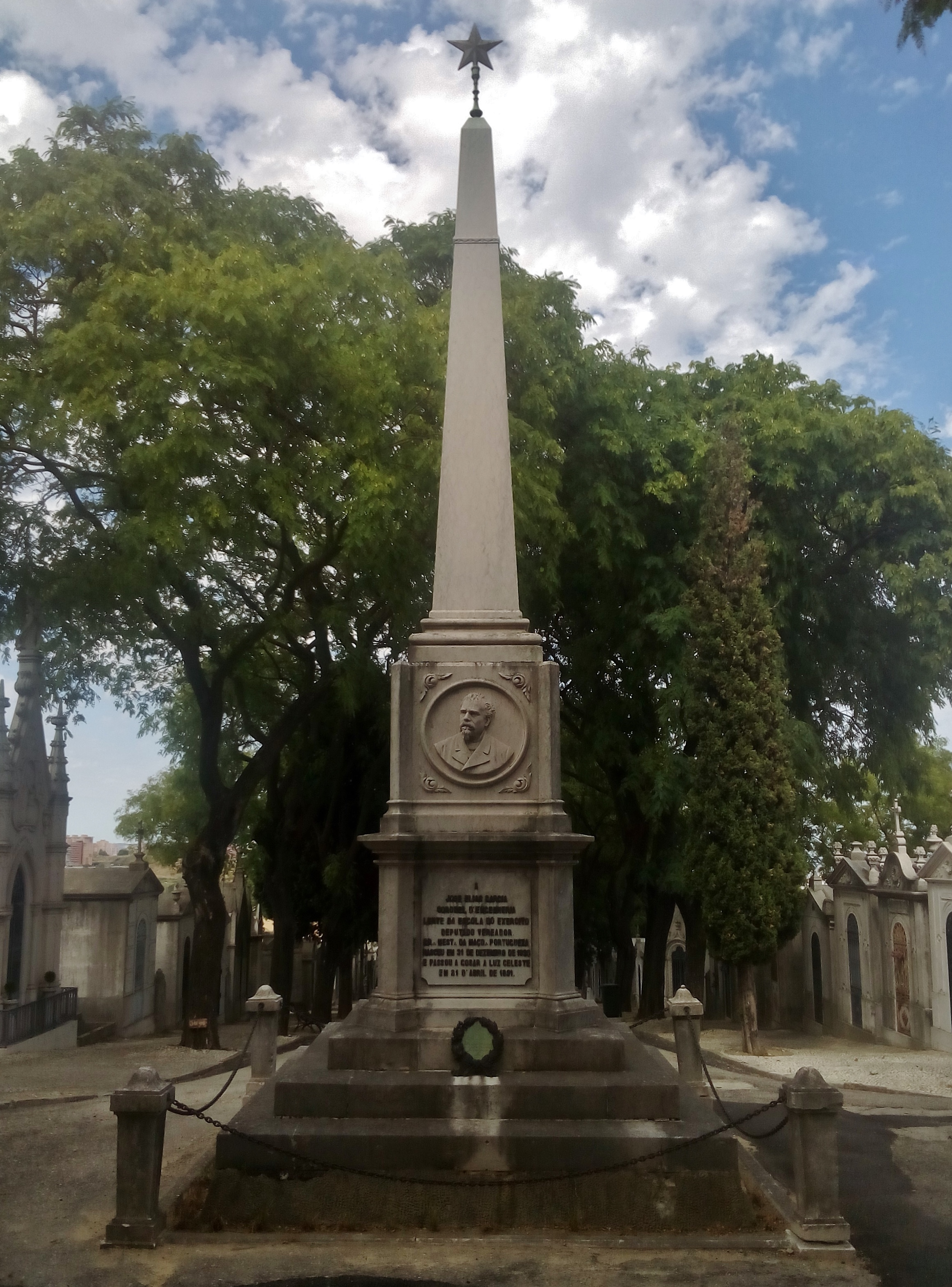
José Elias Garcia mausoleum

== Notable burials or cremations ==
- Adelaide Cabete (1867–1935), physician, teacher and feminist activist
- Adelina Abranches (1866–1945), theater actress
- Adelino da Palma Carlos (1905–1992), 102nd Prime Minister of Portugal
- Agostinho da Silva (1906–1994), philosopher, essayist and writer
- Alfredo Luís da Costa (1883–1908), perpetrator of the Lisbon Regicide
- Álvaro Cunhal (1913–2005), politician, writer and anti-fascist activist
- Alves dos Reis (1886–1955), entrepreneur
- Ana de Castro Osório (1872–1935), physician, teacher, writer, journalist and feminist activist
- António Botto (1897–1959), poet
- António Champalimaud (1918–2004), banker and industrialist
- António da Silva Porto (1850–1893), painter
- António de Almeida Santos (1926–2016), lawyer, politician and government minister
- António de Spínola (1910–1996), 14th President of Portugal
- António Granjo (1881–1921), lawyer and politician
- António José de Almeida (1866–1929), 6th President of Portugal
- António Machado Santos (1875–1921), Navy officer and politician
- António Maria Lisboa (1928–1953), poet
- Artur Jorge (1946-2024), football forward and manager
- Ary dos Santos (1936–1984), poet
- Bana (1932–2013), cape verdean singer
- Eduarda Lapa (1895–1976), painter
- Emília das Neves (1820–1883), theater actress
- Ernesto Hintze Ribeiro (1850–1907), 43rd, 45th and 47th Prime Minister of Portugal
- Fernando Chalana (1959–2022), football player and manager
- Filinto Elísio (1734–1819), poet
- Francisco da Costa Gomes (1914–2001), 15th President of Portugal
- Helena Vaz da Silva (1939–2002), journalist
- João Vaz (1859–1931), painter
- John Smith Athelstane (1816–1883), writer and diplomat
- Jorge Sampaio (1939–2021), 18th President of Portugal
- José Mário Branco (1942–2019), singer, songwriter and composer
- José Pinheiro de Azevedo (1917–1983), 104th Prime Minister of Portugal
- José Rodrigues (1828–1887), painter
- José Rodrigues Miguéis (1901–1980), writer
- José Saramago (1922–2010), Nobel winning writer
- José Vicente Barbosa du Bocage (1823–1907), zoologist and politician
- Leontina de Cabral Hogan(1886-1943), medium and feminist
- Manuel Buíça (1876–1908), perpetrator of the Lisbon Regicide
- Manuel Gomes da Costa (1863–1929), 10th President of Portugal
- Maria Clara Correia Alves (1869–1948), writer, journalist, teacher and feminist activist
- Maria João Abreu (1964–2021), actress
- Maria Matos (1886–1952), actress and stage director
- Maria Severa (1820–1846), Fado singer and guitarist
- Maria Veleda (1871–1955), journalist, teacher and feminist activist
- Miguel Bombarda (1851–1910), physician, psychiatrist and politician
- Mísia (1955–2024), singer
- Nicolau Breyner (1940–2016), actor, stage director and playwright
- Palmira Bastos (1875–1967), actress and stage director
- Stella Piteira Santos (1917–2009), anti-fascist activist
- Vasco Gonçalves (1921–2005), 103rd Prime Minister of Portugal
