= Porto–Lisbon high-speed rail line =

Railway line in Portugal

Overview
- Status: Under construction
- Locale: Portugal
- Termini: Lisboa - Oriente; Porto-Campanhã
- Stations: Leiria, Coimbra, Aveiro, Gaia-Santo Ovídio

Service
- Type: High-speed rail
- Operator: Comboios de Portugal

History
- Opened: After 2032

Technical
- Line length: 290 km (180 mi)
- Number of tracks: Double track
- Track gauge: Iberian gauge (planned)
- Electrification: Overhead catenary
- Operating speed: 300 km/h (190 mph)

The Porto–Lisbon high-speed rail line is a high-speed rail line in Portugal, planned to link the capital Lisbon to the second-largest city Porto in Iberian gauge, with construction of the first phase of the line currently underway.

== Background ==
The Alfa Pendular service currently operates a Braga to Lisbon-Santa Apolónia service via Porto-Campanhã using the Linha do Norte, occasionally continuing to Faro on the Linha do Algarve, operating at a maximum speed of 220 km/h (140 mph).

High-speed rail in Portugal was planned in the 1990s and formally announced in 2005, which included the Lisbon–Madrid high-speed rail line, a Lisbon to Porto line and a line from Porto to Vigo, Spain. The plan was cancelled in 2009 due to the economic downturn.

In 2020 the plan was reactivated as part of an initiative by the Portuguese government to invest €43 billion into infrastructure projects by the 2030s. The line is projected to cost of €4.5 billion, with a proposed 75 minute journey time between the two cities.

== Construction ==
The project will be split into three phases, with the first phase being the section from Porto to Oiã (Oliveira do Bairro), which is planned to be complete by 2030. The second phase will be the section between Oiã and Carregado, which is projected to be finished by 2032. The third phase involves building a small section between Carregado and Lisbon, and is planned to be complete only after 2032. Construction of the first phase of the project started on 12 October 2026.

The rail network will be able to connect Lisbon to Porto with speeds as high as 300km/h, and in a total travel time of 75 minutes without stops, and 105 minutes with stops. The new high-speed line will have stops in Leiria, Coimbra, Aveiro, Vila Nova de Gaia, and termini at Lisboa - Oriente and Porto-Campanhã. In most of the cities, the current stations will be expanded to service the new high-speed line, except in Vila Nova de Gaia, where a new station will be built, called Gaia-Santo Ovídio. To cross the river Douro between Porto and Gaia, a new bridge will be built over the river.

There are also plans to connect Porto to Vigo by high-speed rail, with a line departing from Porto-Campanhã, through Francisco Sá Carneiro Airport and Braga, and ending in Vigo. These plans are less concrete and are expected to be finished only later than 2030.

== See also ==
- High-speed rail in Portugal
- Lisbon–Madrid high-speed rail line
- Porto–Vigo high-speed rail line
