= Aldeia Gavinha =

- Civil parish
- Location in Portugal
- Coordinates: 39°05′N 9°05′W
- Country: Portugal
- Region: Oeste e Vale do Tejo
- Intermunic. comm.: Oeste
- District: Lisbon
- Municipality: Alenquer

Area
  - Total: 8.22 km^{2} (3.17 sq mi)

Population (2001)
  - Total: 1,173
  - Density: 140/km^{2} (370/sq mi)
- Time zone: UTC+00:00 (WET)
  - Summer (DST): UTC+01:00 (WEST)

Aldeia Gavinha (Portuguese pronunciation: [alˈdɐjɐ ɣɐˈviɲɐ]) is a former civil parish, located in the municipality of Alenquer, in western Portugal. In 2013, the parish merged into the new parish Aldeia Galega da Merceana e Aldeia Gavinha. It covers 8.22 km^{2} in area, with 1173 inhabitants as of 2001.
