= Vila Verde (disambiguation) =

Vila Verde is a town and a municipality in northern Portugal. It may also refer to the following places in Portugal:

- Vila Verde (Vila Verde), a civil parish in the municipality of Vila Verde
- Vila Verde (Alijó), a civil parish in the municipality of Alijó
- Vila Verde (Felgueiras), a civil parish in the municipality of Felgueiras
- Vila Verde (Figueira da Foz), a civil parish in the municipality of Figueira da Foz
- Vila Verde (Mirandela), a civil parish in the municipality of Mirandela
- Vila Verde (Vinhais), a civil parish in the municipality of Vinhais
- Vila Verde da Raia, a civil parish in the municipality of Chaves
- Vila Verde de Ficalho, a civil parish in the municipality of Serpa
- Vila Verde dos Francos, a civil parish in the municipality of Alenquer
