= José Ferreira Queimado =

Portuguese businessman (1913–2007)

- Born: 23 December 1913; Olhalvo, Portugal
- Died: 23 December 2007 (aged 94)
- Known for: Presidency of S.L. Benfica

José Ferreira Queimado (23 December 1913 – 23 December 2007) was the 25th president of Portuguese sports club S.L. Benfica.

Born in Olhalvo, Ferreira Queimado served as president of Benfica on two occasions: between 17 June 1966 and 3 July 1967, and between 26 May 1977 and 29 May 1981. During his second tenure, he inaugurated Benfica's swimming pool in 1978 and started the construction of the club's second pavilion (now demolished), also known as Pavilhão Borges Coutinho. During Ferreira Queimado's presidency, Benfica's football team won two Primeira Liga titles (1966–67, 1980–81) and started to use foreign players in 1978. For the services rendered to the club (as associate number 261), he was granted the rank of Merit Associate in 1970 and was awarded the Águia de Ouro (Golden Eagle) by the club in 1980. He died on his 94th birthday.

| Preceded by António Catarino Duarte | President of Benfica; 1966–1967 | Succeeded by Adolfo Vieira de Brito |
| Preceded by Duarte Borges Coutinho | President of Benfica; 1977–1981 | Succeeded by Fernando Martins |
