= Madrid–Extremadura high-speed rail line =

Railway line in Spain

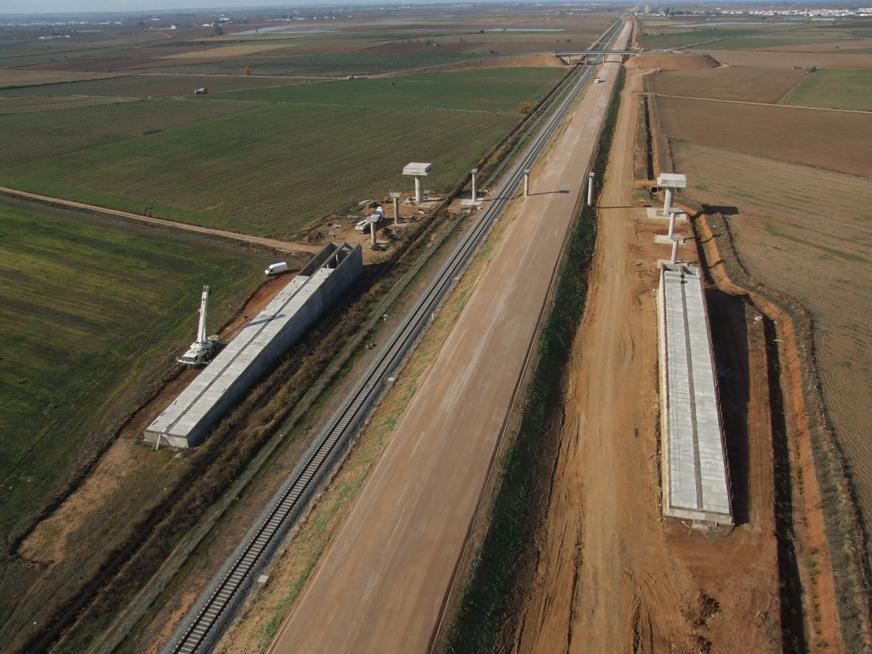
- Construction works in Montijo

Overview
- Termini: Madrid; Badajoz

Service
- Operator: Renfe

History
- Planned opening: 2030 (whole)

Technical
- Operating speed: Majority: 300 km/h (186 mph); Parts of the line: 200–250 km/h (125–155 mph)
- Train protection system: ERTMS

The Madrid—Extremadura high-speed rail line is a rail line under construction in Spain, intended to link Madrid and Badajoz.

As of July 2021, the Badajoz–Mérida stretch had begun electrification.

In 2016 the European Union's European Regional Development Fund, gave Spain €205.1m towards the €312.1m needed for the track between Navalmoral de la Mata and Mérida.

The tentative finishing date for the Plasencia–Navalmoral de la Mata stretch pushed forward to 2025. The Oropesa–Madrid stretch is the least developed part of the project, only in the informative study phase as of 2021. The local government of Talavera de la Reina have lobbied for the undergrounding of the railway as it would pass through Talavera de la Reina.

Once finished by 2030, the Badajoz–Madrid line is expected to provide high-speed rail services linking both cities in 2 hours 31 minutes.

== Segments ==
=== Badajoz–Plasencia ===
The infrastructure is built with multi-purpose railroad ties, set for Iberian gauge but allowing for a future switch to standard gauge. It is single track from Badajoz to Mérida and double track from Mérida to Plasencia.

The Badajoz–Plasencia new railway line entered in service on 19 July 2022 after its institutional inauguration in June 2022, but was not yet electrified and the speed was limited to 200 km/h (125 mph), planned to be increased to 250 km/h (155 mph) when the line will be electrified. The first phase of the electrification is scheduled to be completed in September 2023, when a first test train will circulate between Plasencia and Cáceres (the same will be done later on Cáceres–Badajoz, where the electrification work is also being finalized).

=== Plasencia–Talayuela (Oropesa) ===
The Oropesa segment of the track will be 68.6 km (42.6 mi) long.

=== Oropesa–Madrid ===
127 km (79 mi) long, it will consist of a passenger only double track segment between Madrid and Talavera de la Reina and mixed passenger-freight traffic from Talavera de la Reina to Oropesa.

== Extension to Portugal ==
The extension to Portugal, the Lisbon–Madrid high-speed rail line, forms part of the Trans-European high-speed rail network, which in turn is one of a number of the European Union's Trans-European transport networks (TEN-T). It was defined by the Council Directive 96/48/EC of 23 July 1996. Although in 2012 the project was formally cancelled on the Portuguese side of the project as not being financially viable, it was brought back in 2020 as the Portuguese government saw new opportunities.

The current plan is to open the line by sections on the "South International Corridor", between the Spanish border and Lisbon via Évora (and with another branch from Évora towards the port of Sines). Τhe section between Badajoz and Lisbon was initially planned to open in 2024, with a journey time between Lisbon and Badajoz of 1 hour 50 minutes. The line is currently planned to fully open by 2034.

=== Badajoz–Elvas ===
The border section Badajoz–Elvas is composed of :

- a Spanish section.
- a Portuguese section Elvas–Caia (11 km, 6.8 mi), whose modernization was achieved in 2020.

Medium-term plans include a large Badajoz bypass and a new cross-border/on-the-border station in Caia which will serve both Badajoz and Elvas.

=== Elvas–Évora ===
From Elvas to Évora, a 90 km (56 mi) single-track section of new line is currently under construction, named "New line of Évora" (Portuguese Nova Linha de Évora), which will allow operational speeds up to 250 km/h (155 mph). As of March 2023, this section, designed for a maximum speed of 300 km/h (186 mph), was planned to be completed by the end of 2023. This will be the first high-speed line section to be opened in Portugal (the high-speed sections opened until then were upgraded lines with lower speed). The completion date has since been revised to be near the end of 2026 or the beginning of 2027.

=== Évora–Lisbon ===
The line from Évora to Lisbon via Poceirão, with a new bridge over the Tagus River (as in the original plan) is planned to be upgraded. 100 km (62 mi) of upgraded railway is in service where Intercity trains run at 200 km/h (125 mph) on the upgraded single track.

A new double-tracked high-speed line for the section between Évora-Norte and Poceirão is planned, but given lower priority over other sections of the high speed railway network, with completion predicted not earlier than the mid-2030's. As an intermediate upgrade, planning is underway for the duplication of the current line between Poceirão and Bombel.

More recently, there have been indications in official documents that the TTT-Évora main line will pass north of Poceirão, serving directly the new Lisbon Airport, unlike in previous versions of the project. There are also indications that the TTT and the new line to Évora will be developed in parallel.

== See also ==
- High-speed rail in Portugal
- High-speed rail in Spain
- Porto–Lisbon high-speed rail line
- Porto–Vigo high-speed rail line
