= Miguel Bombarda =

Portuguese physician, psychiatrist, and politician

Miguel Bombarda GCSE
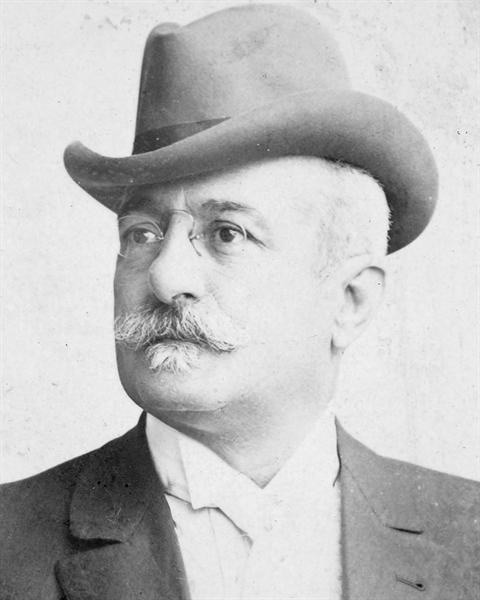

Member of the Chamber of Deputies for Aveiro
- In office 30 April 1908 – 3 October 1910
- Monarch: Manuel II of Portugal

Personal details
- Born: 6 March 1851 Rio de Janeiro, Brazil
- Died: 3 October 1910 (aged 59) Lisbon, Portugal
- Resting place: Alto de São João Cemetery, Lisbon
- Party: Portuguese Republican Party; Independent (until 1909)
- Occupation: Psychiatrist, professor, politician

Miguel Augusto Bombarda GCSE (6 March 1851 – 3 October 1910) was a Portuguese physician, psychiatrist, and politician. He is perhaps most widely remembered as one of the major conspirators of the 5 October 1910 revolution, although he was shot and killed the day before the coup took place by one of his patients, Aparício Rebelo dos Santos.

== Selected publications ==
- Contribuição para o estudo dos microcephalus (1894)
- Lições sobre a epilepsia e as pseudo-epilepsies (1896)
- Estudos Biológicos. A Consciência e o Livre Arbítrio (1898)
- A sciencia e o Jesuitismo: replica a um padre sabio (1900)

== Distinctions ==
=== National orders ===
- Grand Cross of the Order of Saint James of the Sword (2 May 1906)
