= Ventosa (Alenquer) =

- Civil parish
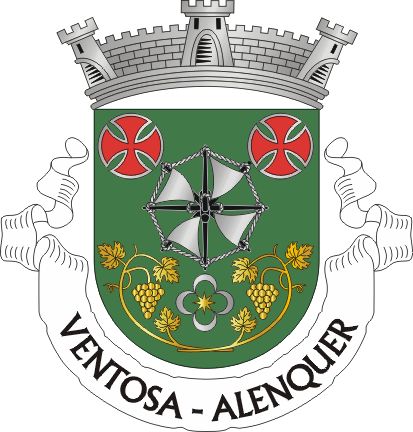
- Coat of arms

- Location in Portugal
- Coordinates: 39.117°N 9.093°W
- Country: Portugal
- Region: Oeste e Vale do Tejo
- Intermunic. comm.: Oeste
- District: Lisbon
- Municipality: Alenquer

Area
  - Total: 22.21 km^{2} (8.58 sq mi)

Population (2011)
  - Total: 2,173
  - Density: 97.84/km^{2} (253.4/sq mi)
- Time zone: UTC+00:00 (WET)
  - Summer (DST): UTC+01:00 (WEST)

Ventosa (Portuguese pronunciation: [vẽˈtɔzɐ]) is a parish of the municipality of Alenquer, in western Portugal. The population in 2011 was 2,173, in an area of 22.21 km^{2}.
