= High-speed rail in Portugal =

RAVE

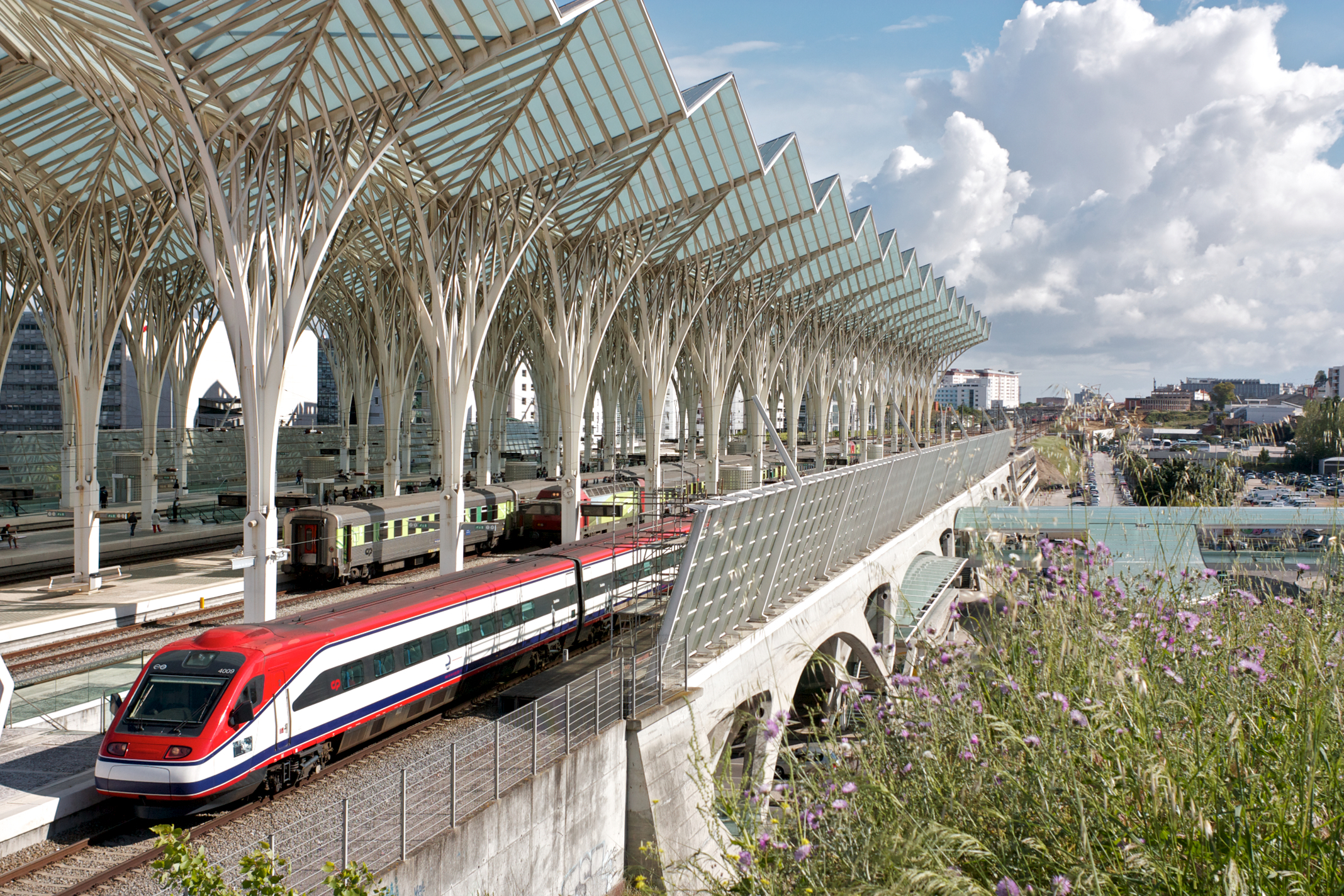

Overview
- Main stations: Lisbon-Oriente, Porto-Campanhã
- Other stations: Valença AV, Ponte de Lima, Braga AV, Airport FSC, Gaia AV, Aveiro, Coimbra-B, Leira, Airport LC, Évora Norte, Elvas/Caia AV
- Fleet: 16
- Stations called at: 13
- Parent company: RAVE
- Dates of operation: ~2029–

Technical
- Track gauge: Bibitola Sleepers; Iberian 1668 mm); Standard (1435 mm)
- Electrification: 25 kV 50 Hz
- Length: 593 km (368 mi)
- Operating speed: 220 km/h (135 mph)

Other
- Website: RAVE

Since the 1990s, Portugal features a network of high-speed trains, which however run mainly on conventional railways as of 2026, with some sections of infrastructure upgraded over the decades. These high-speed services are the so-called Alfa Pendular services, with top speeds of 220 km/h (135 mph), and they connect much of Portugal. Plans have been made for dedicated high-speed railways both within Portugal and to connect to Spain, but these have been cancelled and revived multiple times, and as of 2026 only some parts have been finished.

The most ambitious plans appeared in October 2020, when the Portuguese government proposed a 75 minute rail link between the cities of Lisbon and Porto and a 55 minute rail link between Porto and Vigo (Spain). These new links will connect with the current railway system in Leiria, Coimbra, Aveiro and Braga (besides the already mentioned cities), diminishing travel times overall in the country.

== Current operations ==
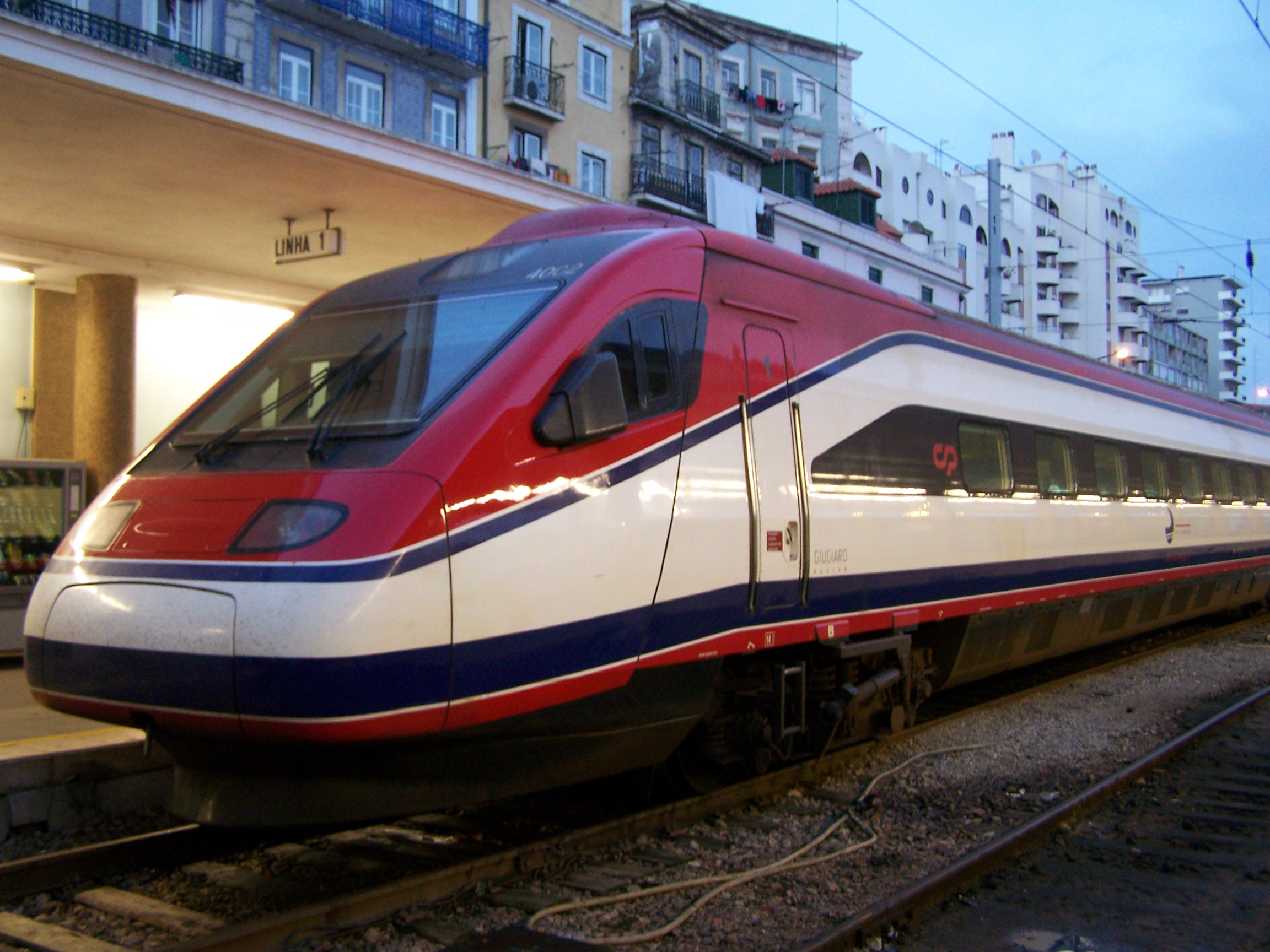
An Alfa Pendular in Santa Apolónia Station, Lisbon.

Since the late 1990s Comboios de Portugal (CP) has run the Alfa Pendular service, connecting Portugal's mainland from the north border to the Algarve at a speed of up to 220 kilometres per hour (140 mph) (in specific sections), which due to the techonology of tilting trains reduced the travel time between Porto and Lisbon by approximately 30 minutes compared to normal trains.

The service is operated using 10 Italian-designed Pendolino tilting trains. Based on the Italian ETR 480, trains were assembled in Portugal at the former SOREFAME/Adtranz plant in Amadora. Fiat Ferroviaria was the main contractor, with Siemens and ADtranz as subcontractors.

In addition to these high-speed trains, CP InterCity "corail" coaches have been upgraded to 200 kilometres per hour (120 mph) running. These are hauled by CP 5600 locomotives (identical to the Spanish RENFE Class 252). These "corail" coaches are based on French SNCF Corail cars but their carbody is made out of stainless steel, manufactured at the SOREFAME plant.

== Current infrastructure ==
Map of current railway infrastructure in Portugal.

The Northern Line was modernised to allow trains to run at 220 km/h between Lisbon-Alverca, Vila Franca de Xira–Santarém, Pombal–Alfarelos and Mealhada–Espinho, and to allow full use of the tilting to achieve speeds between 140–180 km/h in the remaining intermediate sections. Work is underway to continue to bring these intermediate stretches up to standards.

The Southern Line was modernised to allow trains to run at 220 km/h between Lisbon-Pinhal Novo and Grândola–Funcheira; work is underway in a new variant between Pinhal Novo-Grandola to allow seamless 220 km/h running all the way from Lisboa to Funcheira (150 km). Alfa Pendular trains with their top speed of 220 km/h are in fact the only reason the top speed is 220 km/h. The tilting trains run in most slower sections at 20/40 km/h above conventional trains speeds. On high speed sections conventional trains run at 200 km/h and tilting trains at their 220 km/h top speed. The true speed limit on these long sections is well above 220 km/h.

In February 2011, trains began using the Alcácer Bypass, cutting 6.7 km of the Southern Line through means of a 29 km line that includes a bridge across the Sado River. Trains are able to travel at 200 km/h along the section, or 220 km/h with tilting technology. The new bypass has cut 10 minutes from the journey times of trains traveling south from Lisbon towards the Algarve.

Trains run hourly between Lisbon and Porto, most being Alfa Pendular, with the fastest one only featuring intermediate 3 stops (at Coimbra, Aveiro and Vila Nova de Gaia). Other Alfa Pendular and some InterCity (loco-hauled 200 km/h trains with 5/14 cars) call at 6 to 9 intermediate stops. Additionally some Alfa Pendular and Intercity trains run north to Guimarães and Braga and others go down the south line to service Faro, which is served by two Porto – Lisboa – Faro Alfa Pendulars and three Lisbon – Faro InterCities (limited to 160 km/h due to the refurbished Sorefame coaches used on the route).

== Previous plans for high-speed rail ==
In 2005 the Portuguese government had approved the construction of three high-speed lines:

- from Porto to Lisbon (300 km/h new HSL expected to be finished in 2015). The two biggest cities of Portugal would be at a distance of a 1h15 train trip.
- from Lisbon to Madrid (300 km/h mixed traffic HSL expected to be complete by 2013) bringing the countries' capital cities within three hours of each other (less than 2h45 expected).
- from Porto to Vigo (250 km/h mixed traffic new line between Braga and the border) which would connect both extremes (Porto and Vigo) in less than 45 minutes, would link to Vigo-A Coruña.

On December 12, 2009, the Portuguese Ministry of Public Work, Transport and Communications announced the ELOS consortium was awarded a 40-year contract to build, finance and maintain the first 165 km section of the high speed line from Poceirão to the Spanish border, Caia. The route's length is 165 km. The PPP contract was formally signed on 8 May 2010 and included construction of a broad-gauge freight track between Evora and Caia. Completion was expected by the end of 2013.

However, with the Great Recession, and the resulting European sovereign-debt crisis, major public works projects in Portugal were frozen to reduce the amount of public debt. In this context the later elected (2011) Portuguese government withdrew the high-speed railway plans in favour of a plan to develop standard-gauge freight routes to the rest of Europe. After a high profile court battle with the ELOS consortium the high speed rail project was terminated by the Portuguese government.

== Lines planned ==
=== Porto–Lisbon ===
In October 2022 the Portuguese government announced that construction on a new high speed line from Lisbon to Porto would start in 2024. The new line will be built to double track and Iberian gauge. It would allow speeds of up to 300 km/h. This would reduce the current travel time between Lisbon and Porto from the current 2 hours and 49 minutes to 1 hour and 15 minutes. The cost of the project is expected to be € 4.9 billion by 2030, of which € 1 billion is contributed by the European Union.

The line will be constructed in three phases. The first phase between Porto and Soure is to be completed by 2028 and will reduce travel time by 50 minutes. The second phase between Soure and Carregado is to be completed by 2030, further reducing travel time by 40 minutes. The last phase between Carregado and Lisbon will be completed at a later date after 2030 and bring a smaller travel time reduction of 4 minutes.

The capacity of the Lisbon Oriente and Porto Campanhã stations will be increased for this line. Trains on the line will also serve upgraded intermediate stations in Leiria, Coimbra and Aveiro, as well as a new station in Vila Nova de Gaia.

=== Porto–Vigo ===
There are plans to extend the Lisbon–Porto high-speed rail line to Vigo in Spain, where it will connect with the Spanish AVE high speed rail network. There is no target date at this time, however.

=== Lisbon–Madrid ===
The Madrid–Extremadura high-speed rail line in Spain, of which only parts have been finished as of 2026, will be extended to Lisbon by 2034. This would reduce the travel time between both capitals from six hours in 2027 to three hours in 2034. This requires the construction of a new railway from Évora to Elvas, which is expected to enter service in 2026. This new railway would make it possible to travel from Lisbon to Elvas in two hours by 2026. In 2034 this will be reduced to one hour when the entire track is fully operational.
