= Triana (Alenquer) =

- Civil parish
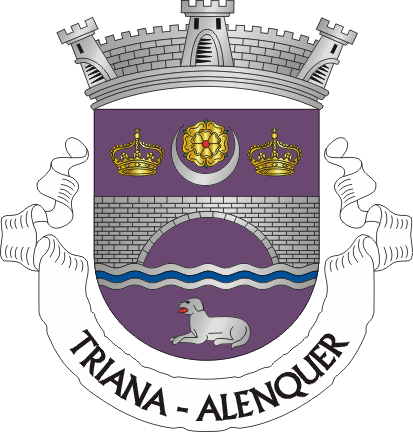
- Coat of arms

- Location in Portugal
- Coordinates: 39°04′N 8°58′W
- Country: Portugal
- Region: Oeste e Vale do Tejo
- Intermunic. comm.: Oeste
- District: Lisbon
- Municipality: Alenquer

Area
  - Total: 32.28 km^{2} (12.46 sq mi)

Population (2001)
  - Total: 3,532
  - Density: 110/km^{2} (280/sq mi)
- Time zone: UTC+00:00 (WET)
  - Summer (DST): UTC+01:00 (WEST)

Triana (Portuguese pronunciation: [tɾiˈɐnɐ]) is a former civil parish, located in the municipality of Alenquer, in western Portugal. In 2013, the parish merged into the new parish Alenquer (Santo Estêvão e Triana). It covers 32.28 km^{2} (12.46 sq mi) in area, with 3,532 inhabitants as of 2001.
