= Porto–Vigo high-speed rail line =

Railway line in Portugal and Spain

Overview
- Status: Proposed
- Locale: Portugal, Spain
- Termini: Porto; Vigo

Service
- Type: High-speed rail

History
- Opened: by 2030

Technical
- Line length: 155.6 km (96.7 mi)
- Number of tracks: Double track
- Operating speed: 250 km/h (155 mph)

The Porto–Vigo high-speed rail line is a proposed high-speed rail line in Portugal, linking its second largest city Porto with the Spanish city of Vigo, Galicia.

== Background ==
Porto and Vigo are currently served by the Celta service, taking 2 hours and 23 minutes to complete its journey.

High-speed rail in Portugal was planned in the 1990s and formally announced in 2005, which included the Lisbon–Madrid high-speed rail line, a Porto to Lisbon line and the line from Porto to Vigo, Spain. The plan was cancelled in 2009 due to the economic downturn.

In 2020 the plan was reactivated as part of an initiative by the Portuguese government to invest €43 billion into infrastructure projects by 2030.

== Construction ==
The initial phase will consist of a line between Braga and Vigo at a cost of €900 million, with a proposed 30 minute journey time between the two cities.

== Route ==
The line will link Porto to Vigo via Porto Airport, Braga and Valença, relieving capacity on the existing Linha do Minho. At Vigo, it would join the Atlantic Axis high-speed rail line.

== See also ==
- High-speed rail in Portugal
- Lisbon–Madrid high-speed rail line
- Porto–Lisbon high-speed rail line
