= Meca (Alenquer) =

- Civil parish
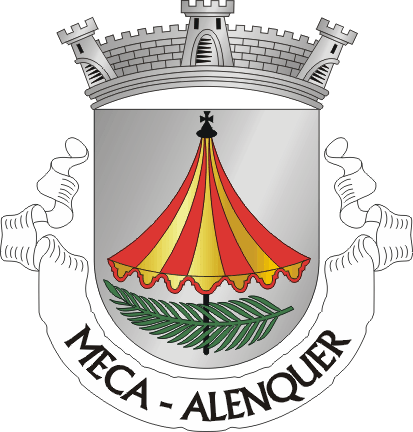
- Coat of arms

- Location in Portugal
- Coordinates: 39.083°N 9.035°W
- Country: Portugal
- Region: Oeste e Vale do Tejo
- Intermunic. comm.: Oeste
- District: Lisbon
- Municipality: Alenquer

Area
  - Total: 14.12 km^{2} (5.45 sq mi)

Population (2011)
  - Total: 1,719
  - Density: 120/km^{2} (320/sq mi)
- Time zone: UTC+00:00 (WET)
  - Summer (DST): UTC+01:00 (WEST)

Meca (Portuguese pronunciation: [ˈmɛkɐ]) is a parish of the municipality of Alenquer, in western Portugal. The population in 2011 was 1,719, in an area of 14.12 km^{2}.
