= Cadafais =

- Civil parish
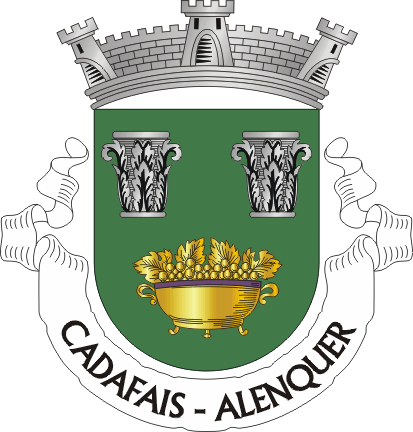
- Coat of arms

- Location in Portugal
- Coordinates: 39°0′N 9°0′W
- Country: Portugal
- Region: Oeste e Vale do Tejo
- Intermunic. comm.: Oeste
- District: Lisbon
- Municipality: Alenquer

Area
  - Total: 9.29 km^{2} (3.59 sq mi)

Population (2001)
  - Total: 1,687
  - Density: 180/km^{2} (470/sq mi)
- Time zone: UTC+00:00 (WET)
  - Summer (DST): UTC+01:00 (WEST)

Cadafais (European Portuguese pronunciation: [kɐðɐˈfajʃ]) is a former civil parish, located in the municipality of Alenquer, in western Portugal. In 2013, the parish merged into the new parish Carregado e Cadafais. It covers 9.29 km² in area, with 1687 inhabitants as of 2001.
