= Leontina de Cabral Hogan =

Portuguese medium

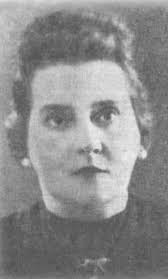
- Born: January 6, 1886; Funchal
- Died: January 18, 1943 (aged 57); Lisbon
- Known for: Member of the National Council of Portuguese Women

Maria Leontina Mendes Ferreira Cabral Hogan, also known as Leontina de Cabral Hogan (6 January 1886 — 18 January 1943 ) was a Portuguese medium, spiritist, and feminist activist and member of the National Council of Portuguese Women.

== Early life ==
Born in Funchal to a wealthy family of the Madeiran bourgeoisie, her parents were João Ferreira Cabral and his wife Virgínia Maria Mendes. She married her first husband, her cousin Carlos Olavo Correia de Azevedo Júnior, in Lisbon on 21 July 1911. They divorced in 1921. On February 28, 1934, she married her second husband, the Portuguese Navy officer and painter, Álvaro Navarro Hogan (1879–1950), who was of Irish descent.

== Spiritism ==
In 1925, she became a spiritist, joining the movement founded by José Augusto Faure da Rosa. She corresponded with the poet and writer Alfredo Pimenta, discussing topics such as "the division of religion Christian faith in the different established dogmas".

== Feminism ==
De Cabral Hogan was a member of the National Council of Portuguese Women, a feminist organization dedicated to the defence of women's social and political rights, from 1938. She joined the Literature Section in 1940, working alongside the activists Etelvina Lopes de Almeida, Maria da Luz de Deus Ramos, Maria Lamas, Maria da Luz Albuquerque and Teresa Leitão de Barros. She was appointed president of the section in 1942, and had sat on the council's board from 1940 to 1942.

== Death and legacy ==
She died on 18 January 1943 of asthma. She is buried in a family tomb, in the Alto de São João Cemetery, in Lisbon. In the January/February 1943 edition of the Portuguese magazine Estudos Psíquicos, a tribute to her read: "She had an unmistakable distinction where not the slightest artifice was discovered. Her expression radiated something spiritual that enhanced and veiled her grace as a woman. Affable and unpretentious, intelligent and cultured, his conversation arrested those who listened."
