= Aldeia Galega da Merceana =

- Civil parish
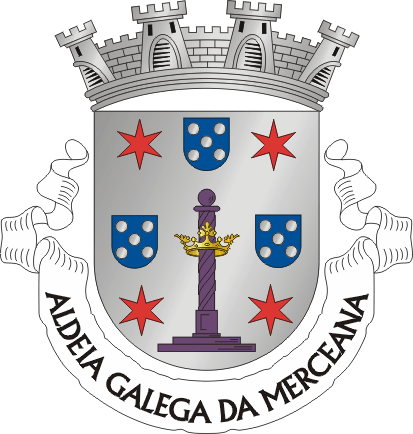
- Coat of arms

- Location in Portugal
- Coordinates: 39°04′N 9°06′W
- Country: Portugal
- Region: Oeste e Vale do Tejo
- Intermunic. comm.: Oeste
- District: Lisbon
- Municipality: Alenquer

Area
  - Total: 19.69 km^{2} (7.60 sq mi)

Population (2001)
  - Total: 2,175
  - Density: 110.5/km^{2} (286.1/sq mi)
- Time zone: UTC+00:00 (WET)
  - Summer (DST): UTC+01:00 (WEST)

Aldeia Galega da Merceana (Portuguese pronunciation: [alˈdɐjɐ ɣɐˈleɣɐ ðɐ mɨɾsiˈɐnɐ]) is a former civil parish, located in the municipality of Alenquer, in western Portugal. In 2013, the parish merged into the new parish Aldeia Galega da Merceana e Aldeia Gavinha. It covers 19.69 km^{2} in area, with 2175 inhabitants as of 2001.
