= Alfredo Pimenta =

Portuguese historian and poet (1882–1950)

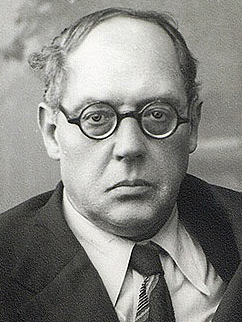
Portrait of Pimenta

Alfredo Augusto Lopes Pimenta (3 December 1882, Guimarães – 15 October 1950, Lisbon) was a Portuguese historian, poet and writer.

== Biography ==
Alfredo Pimenta, son of José Manuel Lopes Pimenta and Silvina Rosa, was born at Penouços in São Mamede de Alda, Guimarães. In 1890, living at Braga with his parents, he attended the Colégio Académico de Guadalupe. In 1893 he returned to Guimaraes and studied at the College of St. Nicholas. In 1910, he graduated in Law from the University of Coimbra and was a professor at the Liceu Passos Manuel in Lisbon from 1911 to 1913. On 22 December 1931 he became director of the Municipal Archive of Guimarães. He was a founding member of the Portuguese Institute of Archaeology, History and Ethnography in 1953 and the Portuguese Academy of History in 1937.

Initially a militant anarchist, he later moved toward republicanism. After the founding of the Republic, he joined the Partido Republicano Evolucionista. In 1915 he appeared as a contributor of the Portuguese Nation magazine, organ of the political philosophy of Integralismo Lusitano, and ended up becoming a militant monarchist and became a prominent counselor. This passage toward the monarchy occurred soon after the coup of 14 May 1915, which overthrew the government of Pimenta de Castro, supported by evolutionists. He later converted to Roman Catholicism.

He suggested a reconciliation between the theses of Auguste Comte and the neo-Thomists. He founded the Acção Realista Portuguesa in 1923, breaking ideologically with Integralismo Lusitano, to which had never formally belonged. He come to admire Salazar, and praised fascism and Nazism. After the Second World War, he complained of the harassment of the Nazis, implying the existence of concentration camps among the Allies. He joined The Voice, which advocated the restoration of the monarchy but as a sort of crowning of the Estado Novo, which contrasted with the time he wrote Mentira Monarchica (Monarchist Lies) in 1906.

He was a renowned political theorist and historian, and his most enduring contribution was in the field of history, especially of the Middle Ages. He corresponded with the medium and feminist Leontina de Cabral Hogan.

== Selected published works ==
- 1906 - Mentira Monarchica (Monarchist Lies)
- 1908 - Factos sociais - (Social Facts)
- 1911 - Aos conservadores portugueses - (To the conservative Portuguese)
- 1912 - Na Torre da Ilusão (In the Tower of Illusion)
- 1913 - As Igrejas eo Estado - (The Churches and the State)
- 1913 - Política portuguesa - (Portuguese Politics)
- 1914 - Alma Ajoelhada - (Soul Kneeling)
- 1914 - A doutrina de Drago ea 2ª Conferência da Paz - (The doctrine of Drago and 2nd Peace Conference)
- 1915 - A significação filosófica da Guerra Europeia. O imperialismo contemporâneo - (The philosophical significance of the European War. Contemporary imperialism)
- 1934 - História de Portugal - (History of Portugal)
- 1936 - D. João III - (John III)
- 1937 - Subsídios Para a História de Portugal - (Grants for the History of Portugal)
- 1937–1948 - Estudos Históricos (série de 25 pequenos ensaios) - (Historical Studies (series of 25 short essays)
