= Carnota (Alenquer) =

- Civil parish
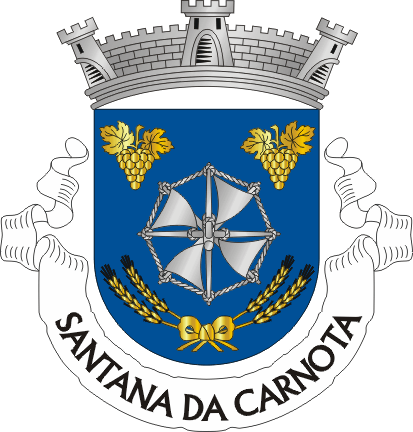
- Coat of arms

- Location in Portugal
- Coordinates: 39.144°N 9.018°W
- Country: Portugal
- Region: Oeste e Vale do Tejo
- Intermunic. comm.: Oeste
- District: Lisbon
- Municipality: Alenquer

Area
  - Total: 18.09 km^{2} (6.98 sq mi)

Population (2011)
  - Total: 1,678
  - Density: 93/km^{2} (240/sq mi)
- Time zone: UTC+00:00 (WET)
  - Summer (DST): UTC+01:00 (WEST)

Carnota (Portuguese pronunciation: [kɐɾˈnɔtɐ]) is a parish of the municipality of Alenquer, in western Portugal. The population in 2011 was 1,678, in an area of 18.09 km².
