= José Rodrigues Miguéis =

Portuguese translator and writer (1901–1980)

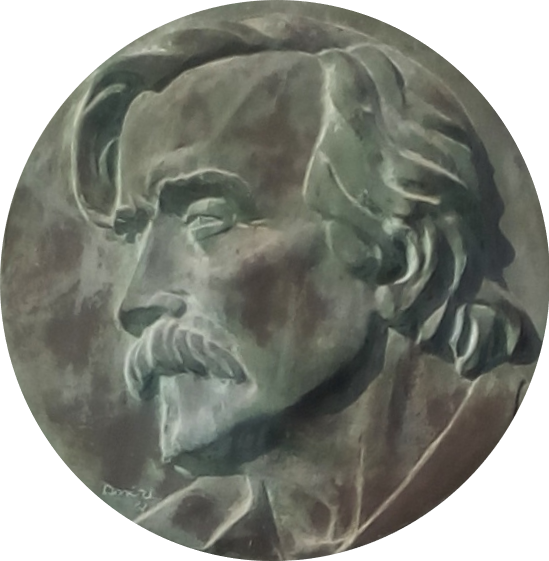
A bas-relief bust of writer José Rodrigues Miguéis, on his tomb in the Cemitério do Alto de São João, Lisbon, Portugal.

José Rodrigues Miguéis (9 December 1901, Lisbon – 27 October 1980, New York) was a Portuguese translator and writer.

== Biography ==
Born to a middle-class family in the Alfama neighborhood of Lisbon, he was originally expected to have a career in law; taking his degree in 1924. He never practiced, however, having decided to pursue literary studies and pedagogy instead. In pursuit of these new interests, he attended the Université libre de Bruxelles and graduated in 1933 with a degree in Pedagogical Science. While there, he met and married a Russian-born educator named Pecia Cogan Portnoi. Together with Raul Brandão, he created a set of new primary readers, but these were never approved for use by the Portuguese government.

In fact, having inherited a progressive outlook from his father, a native of Galicia, he came into conflict with the Estado Novo and left Portugal for a self-imposed exile in the United States. From 1935 until his death, he would pay only short visits to his homeland. His literary activities were supported by working as a translator and as an editor for Reader's Digest. He remarried in 1940 and acquired U.S. citizenship in 1942. Following the war, he fell seriously ill and almost died. From that point on, he gave up his revolutionary activities and devoted himself entirely to writing.

In 1961, he was elected a member of the Hispanic Society of America and, in 1976, was given a membership at the Lisbon Academy of Sciences. Just one year before his death, he was awarded the Military Order of Saint James of the Sword.

His biography was written by Mário Neves and published in 1990.

== Works in English ==
- Happy Easter (Páscoa feliz, 1932), translated by John Byrne ISBN 1-85754-204-5
- A Man Smiles at Death with Half a Face (Um homem sorri à morte com meia cara, 1959), translated by George Monteiro ISBN 0-87451-503-3
- Steerage and Ten Other Stories (1983), various translators ISBN 0-943722-06-3
