= John Smith Athelstane, 1st Count of Carnota =

British diplomat, author, biographer and painter

His Excellency The Count of Carnota GCC
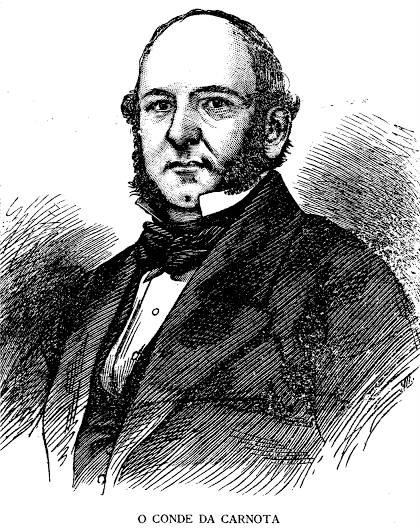
- Born: John Smith Athelstane; 9 May 1813; London, England
- Died: 16 April 1886 (aged 72); Alenquer, Portugal
- Occupation: Diplomat

John Smith Athelstane GCC (9 May 1813 – 16 April 1886) was a British diplomat, writer, biographer and painter. He was the son of Michael Athleston-Smith and Sarah Walton. He was the first and only Count of Carnota in Portugal and used this status as his author name.

John Smith was born in London on 9 May 1813, and died in Portugal on his estate (Quinta da Carnota) in Alenquer (Portugal) on 16 April 1886. He was the brother of the 2nd Duchess of Saldanha. He is buried in Lisbon in the Jazigo da Carnota at the Alto de São João Cemetery.

== Biography ==
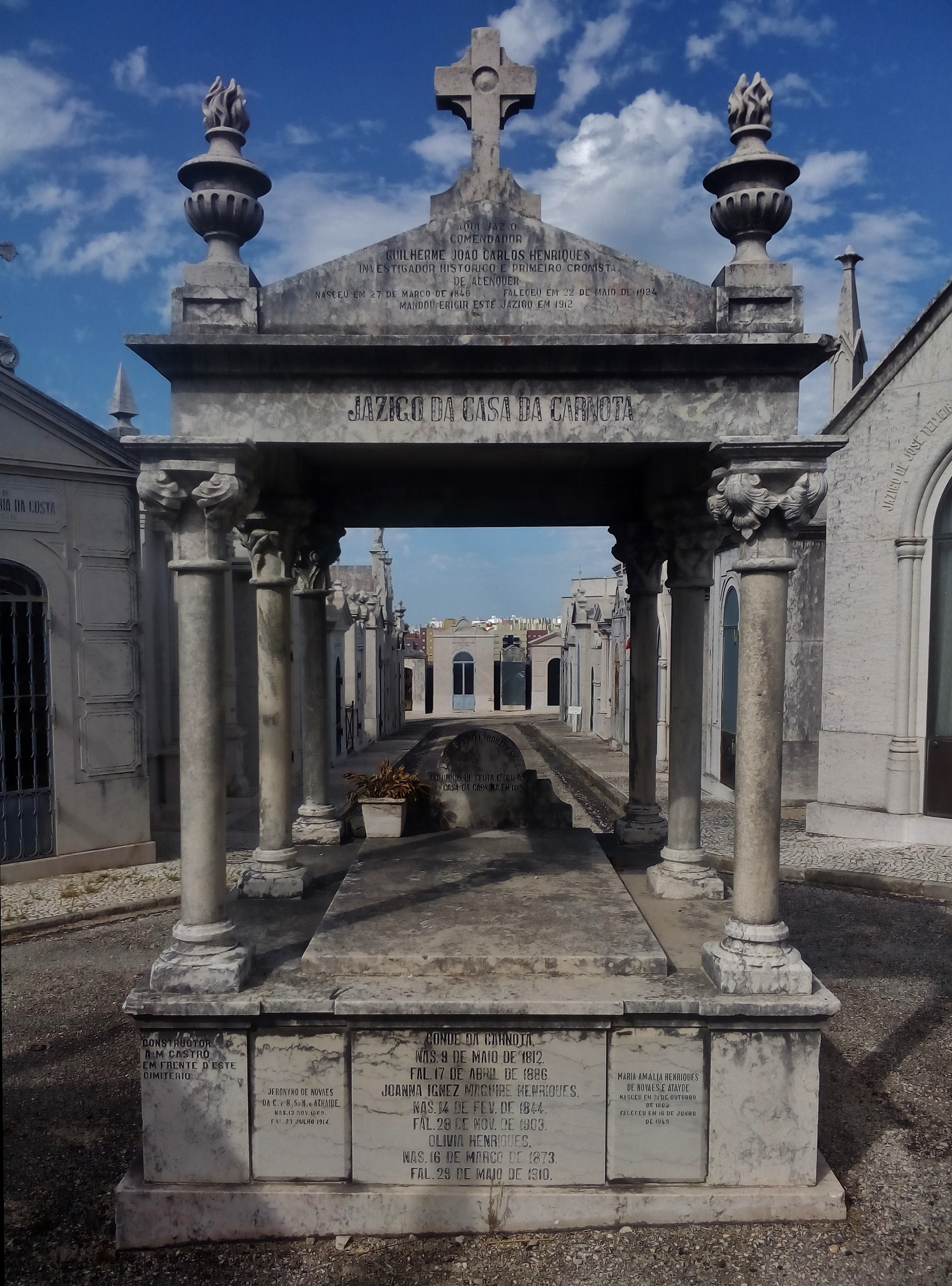
Family plot of the House of Carnota, Alto de São João Cemetery, Lisbon

Initially he studied Law, but changed his course to diplomacy. On his voyages through Europe as secretary to the Duke of Saldanha he gathered many elements for his latter works from the several embassies. In 1852, he bought the Quinta da Carnota, an ancient convent near Refugidos, Cadafais (Alenquer), and established his life and work there.

In 1843, he published the two-volume work entitled Memoirs of the Marquis of Pombal, a lith extracts from his writings and from despatches in the State-paper office never before published in London. In 1871, he republished that work with the new title The Marquis of Pombal by the Conde da Carnota with several changes to its content. In 1880 he published Memoirs of the Duke of Saldanha, 1880, in two volumes. On 9 August 1870, King Luís I of Portugal gave John Smith Athelstane the title of Conde da Carnota. He was married on 30 April 1850 in England to Miss Anne Tilby, who later died at the Quinta da Carnota on 7 November 1856, and was buried in that property. From this marriage there were no descendants. He left his heritage to his godson William John Charles Henry (Guilherme João Carlos Henriques), a British subject that continued John Smith's work. John Smith Athelstane was also a painter and had valuable paintings signed by him.

== Author's work ==
- Memoirs of Field-Marshal the Duke de Saldanha, with selections from his correspondence (Volume 1)
- Memoirs of Field-Marshal the Duke de Saldanha, with selections from his correspondence (Volume 2)
- Memoirs of the Marquis of Pombal; with extracts from his writings, and from despatches in the state paper office, never before published (Volume 1)
- Memoirs of the Marquis of Pombal; with extracts from his writings, and from despatches in the state paper office, never before published (Volume 2)
- The Marquis of Pombal by the Conde da Carnota
