= Third Tagus Crossing =

Third Tagus Crossing Terceira Travessia do Tejo
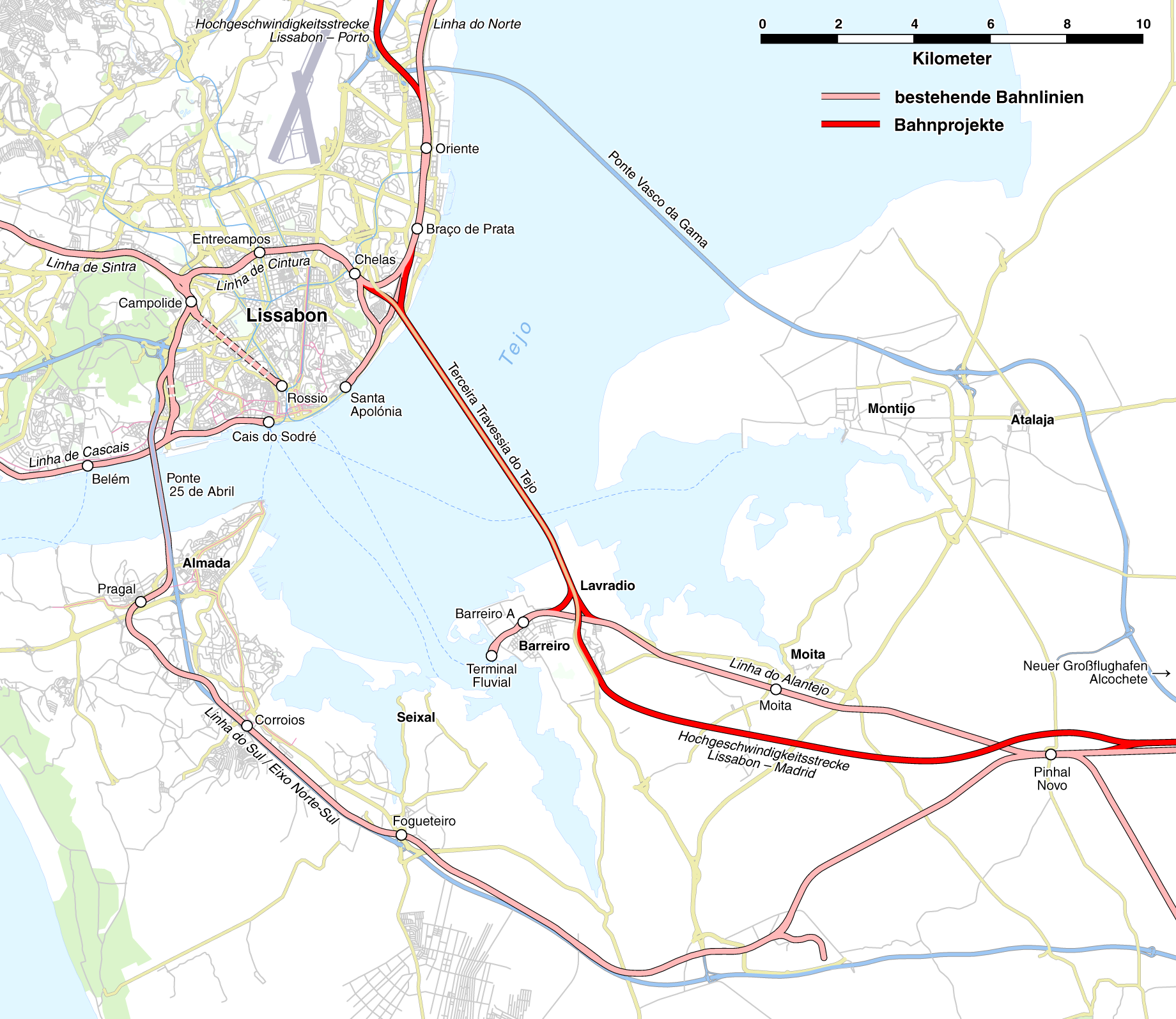
- Coordinates: 38°41′44.49″N 9°5′3.55″W
- Crosses: Tagus River
- Locale: Lisbon, Portugal
- Official name: Terceira Travessia do Tejo

Characteristics
- Total length: 15 km
- Height: Towers: 198 m
- No. of lanes: 3 or 4

Rail characteristics
- No. of tracks: 4

The Third Tagus Crossing (Portuguese: Terceira Travessia do Tejo; commonly abbreviated as TTT) is a project for a road-rail crossing over the Tagus River, with the aim of connecting the city of Lisbon, on the north bank, to the peninsula of Setúbal on the south bank. It is part of the construction of the new Lisbon-Madrid and Lisbon-Seville high-speed railway line ("RAVE").

== Characteristics ==
The crossing would link the localities of Chelas, on the north bank, and Barreiro, on the south and would have a length of approximately 15 kilometers. Its towers would have a height of 198 meters, becoming one of Portugal's highest structures.

The bridge would carry three to four road lanes and two railway lines in each direction, one line to be used by high speed rail services and the other to integrate the Alentejo Line from the Refer network.

== See also ==
- High-speed rail in Portugal
- Caminhos de Ferro Portugueses
