= Carregado e Cadafais =

- Civil parish
- Location in Portugal
- Coordinates: 39.023°N 8.980°W
- Country: Portugal
- Region: Oeste e Vale do Tejo
- Intermunic. comm.: Oeste
- District: Lisbon
- Municipality: Alenquer

Area
  - Total: 24.52 km^{2} (9.47 sq mi)

Population (2011)
  - Total: 13,441
  - Density: 548.2/km^{2} (1,420/sq mi)
- Time zone: UTC+00:00 (WET)
  - Summer (DST): UTC+01:00 (WEST)

Carregado e Cadafais is a civil parish in the municipality of Alenquer, Portugal. It was formed in 2013 by the merger of the former parishes Carregado and Cadafais. The population in 2011 was 13,441, in an area of 24.52 km^{2}.
