= Olhalvo =

- Civil parish
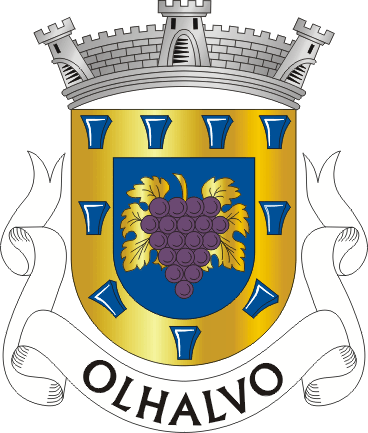
- Coat of arms

- Location in Portugal
- Coordinates: 39.099°N 9.065°W
- Country: Portugal
- Region: Oeste e Vale do Tejo
- Intermunic. comm.: Oeste
- District: Lisbon
- Municipality: Alenquer

Area
  - Total: 8.30 km^{2} (3.20 sq mi)

Population (2011)
  - Total: 1,907
  - Density: 230/km^{2} (600/sq mi)
- Time zone: UTC+00:00 (WET)
  - Summer (DST): UTC+01:00 (WEST)

Olhalvo (Portuguese pronunciation: [oˈʎalvu]) is a parish of the municipality of Alenquer, in western Portugal. Its population in 2011 was 1,907. Olhalvo has an area of 8.30 km².

== Heritage ==
Significant buildings include:

- Church of "Nossa Senhora da Encarnação", XVII century.
- Convent of Carmelitas Descalços" construction began in 1646, and has been under private ownership since 1941.
- Chapel of "Senhor dos Aflitos", belonged to "Recolhimento de Nossa Senhora da Conceição", in 1663. It was sold to private owners in 1873.
- Cruzeiro
- Fontain

Olhalvo supports many cultural activities; the following groups are active:

- A Philharmonic Band, "Banda da Sociedade Filarmónica Olhalvense", SFO, started activity in 1918
- Folk dance group "O Rancho Folclorico", since 1978, also within SFO
- Folk dance group "A Associação Recreativa da Pocariça", also active in sports
- Samba School, "Escola de Samba de Penafirme da Mata"
- Folk music group "Noses com Vozes", within "Associação Alegres Olhares" related to traditional music.

== Special events ==
- Pilgrimage from Olhalvo to Nazaré, "Círio de Olhalvo à Nossa Senhora da Nazaré"–started in the sixteenth century. It occurs each year in September, organized by the inhabitants of Olhalvand, Penafirme da Mata e Pocariça in rotation.
- Singing to the kings "Cantar dos Reis", on the night of 5 January a group of men sings in the streets a theme related to the kings visiting the newborn Jesus. Small paintings are made in the houses wishing a good year to the people.
- Annual festivities occur in September at Olhalvo's main square.

== Localities within Olhalvo parish ==
Besides Olhalvo itself:

- Penafirme da Mata
- Casais da Lage
- Cruzeiro
- Pousoa
- Pocariça
- Casal Perdigoto
- Casal Das Surraipas
