= Vila Verde dos Francos =

- Civil parish
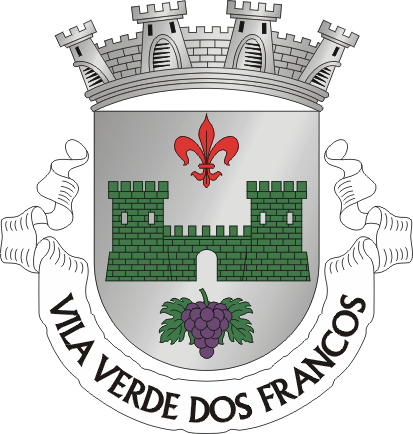
- Coat of arms

- Location in Portugal
- Coordinates: 39.154°N 9.113°W
- Country: Portugal
- Region: Oeste e Vale do Tejo
- Intermunic. comm.: Oeste
- District: Lisbon
- Municipality: Alenquer

Area
  - Total: 28.13 km^{2} (10.86 sq mi)

Population (2011)
  - Total: 1,162
  - Density: 41.31/km^{2} (107.0/sq mi)
- Time zone: UTC+00:00 (WET)
  - Summer (DST): UTC+01:00 (WEST)

Vila Verde dos Francos (Portuguese pronunciation: [ˈvilɐ ˈveɾðɨ ðuʃ ˈfɾɐ̃kuʃ]) is a parish of the municipality of Alenquer, in western Portugal. The population in 2011 was 1,162, in an area of 28.13 km².
