= Carregado =

- Civil parish
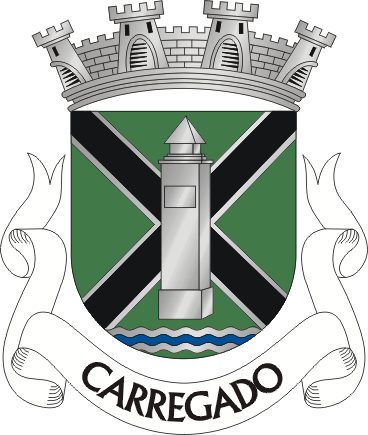
- Coat of arms

- Location in Portugal
- Coordinates: 39°01′N 8°58′W
- Country: Portugal
- Region: Oeste e Vale do Tejo
- Intermunic. comm.: Oeste
- District: Lisbon
- Municipality: Alenquer
- Disbanded: 2013

Area
  - Total: 15.52 km^{2} (5.99 sq mi)

Population (2001)
  - Total: 9,066
  - Density: 580/km^{2} (1,500/sq mi)
- Time zone: UTC+00:00 (WET)
  - Summer (DST): UTC+01:00 (WEST)

Carregado (European Portuguese pronunciation: [kɐʁɨˈɣaðu]) is a former civil parish, located in the municipality of Alenquer, in western Portugal. In 2013, the parish merged into the new parish Carregado e Cadafais. It has a population of 9,066 inhabitants and a total area of 15.52 km^{2}. The town is a north-east exurb of Lisbon.

The railway between Carregado and Lisbon was the first line to be built in Portugal; it opened in 1856.

== See also ==
- History of rail transport in Portugal
