= Triana Parera =

Mexican artist (born 1988)

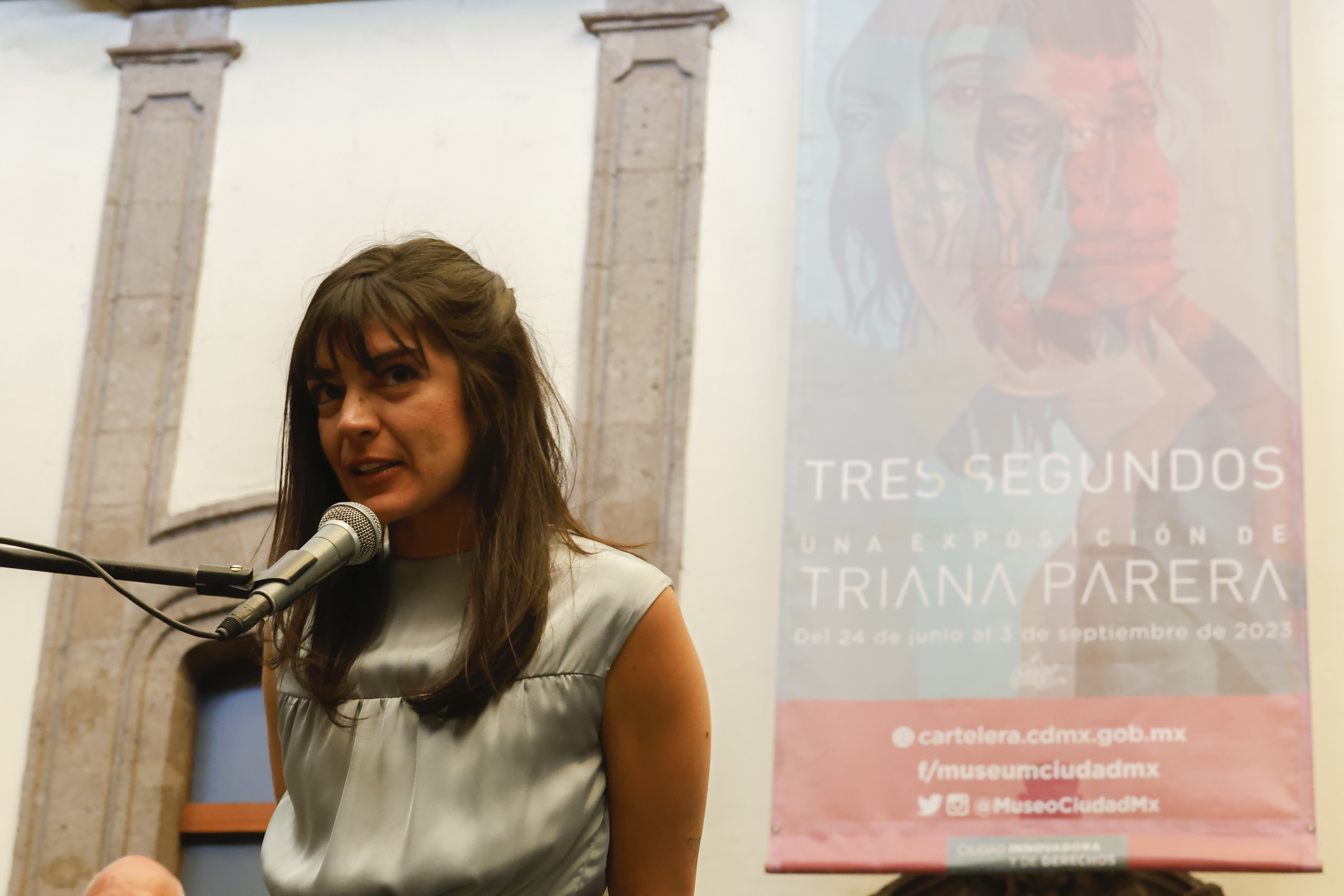
- Born: 1988 (age 37–38); Mexico
- Education: National School of Painting, Sculpture, and Engraving, La Esmerelda La Esmeralda
- Occupations: Visual Artist, Illustrator and Designer

Triana Parera (Mexico City, 1988) is a Mexican visual artist, graphic designer and illustrator. She participated in the Bilbao International Engraving Festival in 2019 and has been a collaborator and resident in La Ceiba Gráfica of Xalapa and in the Art Institute of Berlin.

== Career ==
Parera studied at the National School of Painting, Sculpture and Engraving, La Esmerelda.

Her work spans diverse disciplines and artistic techniques such as engraving, urban art, murals, digital drawing, installation, among others. In her work, she uses sarcasm and sense of humor to represent the humanity beyond the rational.

In 2016, she worked on a painting of Algie, Pink Floyd's inflatable pig at the request of Roger Waters in collaboration with Héctor Ruiz Reez for an event in Mexico City.

She has participated in group expositions at a national and international level. In 2019 she presented her first individual exhibition named Los Monstros del Alba; (English: Alba's Monsters) in 2022, Todo lo que brilla es oro (English: Everything that Shines is Gold) in the Centro Cultural Gabriel García Márquez, in relation to the International Book Fair of Bogotá and in 2023, she presented Tres Segundos (English: Three Seconds), her third individual show in the Museum of Mexico City.
