= Aldeia Galega da Merceana e Aldeia Gavinha =

- Civil parish
- Location in Portugal
- Coordinates: 39.082°N 9.112°W
- Country: Portugal
- Region: Oeste e Vale do Tejo
- Intermunic. comm.: Oeste
- District: Lisbon
- Municipality: Alenquer

Area
  - Total: 27.96 km^{2} (10.80 sq mi)

Population (2011)
  - Total: 3,221
  - Density: 120/km^{2} (300/sq mi)
- Time zone: UTC+00:00 (WET)
  - Summer (DST): UTC+01:00 (WEST)

Aldeia Galega da Merceana e Aldeia Gavinha is a civil parish in the municipality of Alenquer, Portugal. It was formed in 2013 by the merger of the former parishes Aldeia Galega da Merceana and Aldeia Gavinha. The population in 2011 was 3,221, in an area of 27.96 km².
