= USS Triana =

Two ships of the United States Navy have been named USS Triana, probably for Rodrigo de Triana, the lookout aboard Pinta, who first sighted land on 12 October 1492 during Christopher Columbus's first voyage to the New World, although no documentary evidence has been found linking either ship to Triana.

- USS Triana (1865), a tug launched in 1865 and wrecked in 1891
- USS Triana (IX-223), an unclassified miscellaneous vessel commissioned in 1945 and decommissioned in 1946
