= Alenquer (Santo Estêvão e Triana) =

- Civil parish
- Location in Portugal
- Coordinates: 39.055°N 9.010°W
- Country: Portugal
- Region: Oeste e Vale do Tejo
- Intermunic. comm.: Oeste
- District: Lisbon
- Municipality: Alenquer

Area
  - Total: 50.08 km^{2} (19.34 sq mi)

Population (2011)
  - Total: 10,821
  - Density: 220/km^{2} (560/sq mi)
- Time zone: UTC+00:00 (WET)
  - Summer (DST): UTC+01:00 (WEST)

Alenquer (Santo Estêvão e Triana) is a civil parish in the municipality of Alenquer, Portugal. It was formed in 2013 by the merger of the former parishes Santo Estêvão (Alenquer) and Triana (Alenquer). The population in 2011 was 10,821, in an area of 50.08 km².
