= Alenquer, Portugal =

Alenquer
- Municipality
- Town of Alenquer
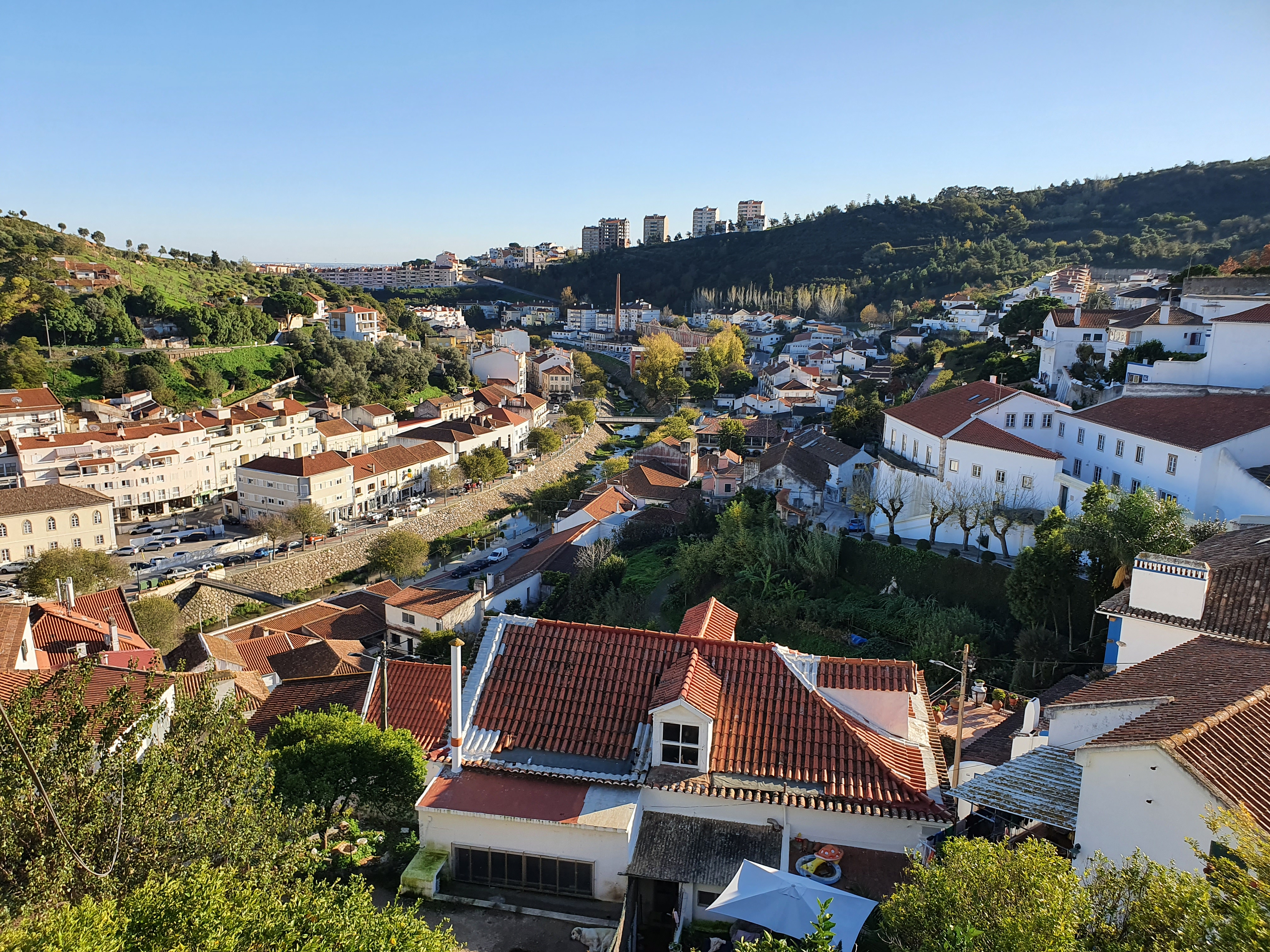
- View of Alenquer from Praça Luís de Camões

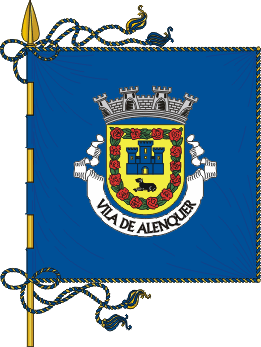
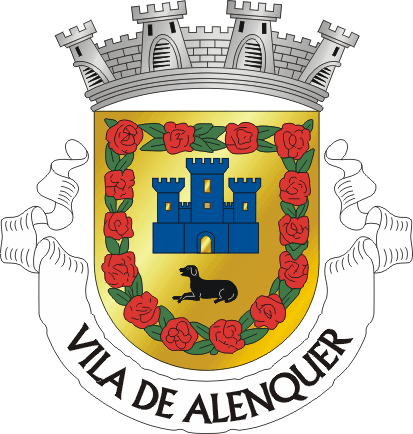
- Flag Coat of arms
- Interactive map of Alenquer
- Location in Portugal
- Coordinates: 39°03′N 9°01′W
- Country: Portugal
- Region: Oeste e Vale do Tejo
- Intermunic. comm.: Oeste
- District: Lisbon
- Parishes: 11

Government
  - President: Paulo Sequeira Santos

Area
  - Total: 304.22 km^{2} (117.46 sq mi)

Population (2011)
  - Total: 43,267
  - Density: 142.22/km^{2} (368.36/sq mi)
- Time zone: UTC+00:00 (WET)
  - Summer (DST): UTC+01:00 (WEST)
- Local holiday: Ascension Day (date varies)
- Website: http://www.cm-alenquer.pt

Alenquer (Portuguese pronunciation: [ɐlẽˈkɛɾ]), officially the Town of Alenquer (Portuguese: Vila de Alenquer), is a Portuguese municipality in the historical Estremadura province, in the Lisbon District and in the Oeste region. The population in 2011 was 43,267, in an area of 304.22 square kilometres (117.46 mi^{2}). The present Mayor is Pedro Miguel Ferreira Folgado.

== History ==
Alenquer received its Foral in 1212 by the hand of Infanta (Princess) Sancha, Lady of Alenquer, daughter of King Sancho I of Portugal.

== Climate ==
Alenquer has a mediterranean climate with hot, dry summers and mild, wet winters. It has a total of 2763.9 annual hours of sunshine.

Climate data for Ota Airport, Alenquer, 1961-1990, altitude: 40 m (130 ft)
| Month | Jan | Feb | Mar | Apr | May | Jun | Jul | Aug | Sep | Oct | Nov | Dec | Year |
|---|---|---|---|---|---|---|---|---|---|---|---|---|---|
| Record high °C (°F) | 21.6 (70.9) | 24.5 (76.1) | 27.3 (81.1) | 29.4 (84.9) | 36.5 (97.7) | 43.5 (110.3) | 40.5 (104.9) | 40.9 (105.6) | 39.8 (103.6) | 33.6 (92.5) | 29.4 (84.9) | 22.8 (73.0) | 43.5 (110.3) |
| Mean daily maximum °C (°F) | 14.7 (58.5) | 15.7 (60.3) | 17.7 (63.9) | 19.2 (66.6) | 22.0 (71.6) | 25.6 (78.1) | 28.4 (83.1) | 28.7 (83.7) | 27.4 (81.3) | 23.1 (73.6) | 18.0 (64.4) | 15.1 (59.2) | 21.3 (70.4) |
| Daily mean °C (°F) | 10.1 (50.2) | 11.0 (51.8) | 12.8 (55.0) | 14.4 (57.9) | 16.9 (62.4) | 20.0 (68.0) | 22.4 (72.3) | 22.5 (72.5) | 21.4 (70.5) | 17.8 (64.0) | 13.4 (56.1) | 10.7 (51.3) | 16.1 (61.0) |
| Mean daily minimum °C (°F) | 5.5 (41.9) | 6.3 (43.3) | 7.9 (46.2) | 9.6 (49.3) | 11.8 (53.2) | 14.4 (57.9) | 16.4 (61.5) | 16.3 (61.3) | 15.4 (59.7) | 12.5 (54.5) | 8.8 (47.8) | 6.3 (43.3) | 10.9 (51.7) |
| Average rainfall mm (inches) | 84.6 (3.33) | 88.7 (3.49) | 61.8 (2.43) | 56.7 (2.23) | 44.1 (1.74) | 20.9 (0.82) | 4.5 (0.18) | 5.7 (0.22) | 23.2 (0.91) | 74.1 (2.92) | 103.6 (4.08) | 89.2 (3.51) | 657.1 (25.86) |
Source: Instituto de Meteorologia

== Notable residents ==
- Pero de Alenquer a 15th-century Portuguese explorer of the African coast
- Damião de Góis (1502 in Alenquer – 1574) an important Portuguese humanist philosopher.
- John Smith Athelstane, 1st Count of Carnota (1813-1886 in Alenquer) a British diplomat, author, biographer and painter.

== Parishes ==
Administratively, the municipality is divided into 11 civil parishes (freguesias):

- Abrigada e Cabanas de Torres
- Aldeia Galega da Merceana e Aldeia Gavinha
- Alenquer
- Carnota
- Carregado e Cadafais
- Meca
- Olhalvo
- Ota
- Ribafria e Pereiro de Palhacana
- Ventosa
- Vila Verde dos Francos

== See also ==
- Alenquer DOC, a wine designation.
