= Josefa de Oliveira =

Portuguese actress and singer (1853-1909)

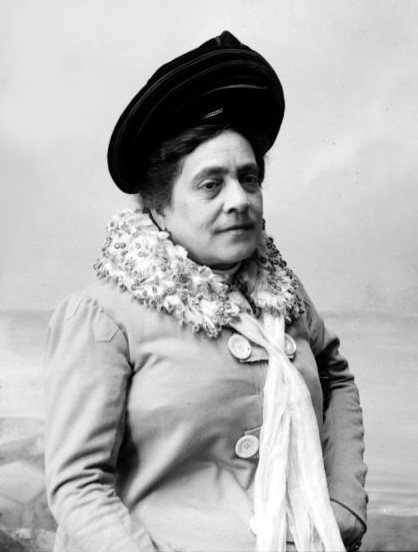
- Born: 24 December 1853; Viseu, Portugal
- Died: 17 April 1909 (aged 55); Porto, Portugal
- Resting place: Cemetery of Prado do Repouso, Porto
- Occupation(s): actress and singer
- Years active: 35
- Partner: António Pinheiro

Josefa de Oliveira (1853 — 1909), was a Portuguese theatre actress and lyrical singer.

== Early life ==
De Oliveira was born in Viseu, the daughter of José Francisco and his wife, Maria Rosa. Neither the parish nor the exact date of her birth are known, but it is believed that she was born on 24 December in 1852, 1853, or 1854. Little is known about her childhood or when and for what reason she moved to the Portuguese capital of Lisbon.

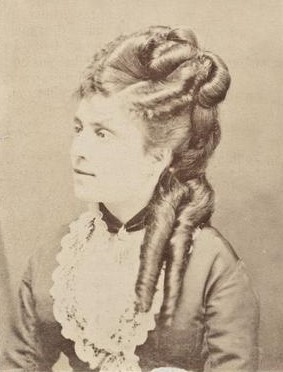
Josefa de Oliveira at 26

She first appeared in the Lisbon theatre, making her debut on 6 May 1873, at the Teatro da Trindade, in the operetta Equilíbrios d'amor. On the night of her debut, the public cared more about where she came from than about her artistic performance, humiliating her during her performance. She soon left Lisbon, settling in the city of Porto. There she made her debut the following year, later moving to the Teatro Baquet in Porto. She continued to have a successful career and, when the fame of her triumphs on Porto's stages reached Lisbon, businessman Francisco Palha persuaded her to return to the capital.

On 25 April 1878, again on the stage of the Trindade, she appeared in the play Viagem à lua (Journey to the moon), being enthusiastically applauded. She remained in the same theatre for 14 years, until 1892. Then, feeling her voice was no longer suitable for operettas, she decided to dedicate herself exclusively to comedy, signing up with the Teatro do Ginásio, where she was also very well received. Among other roles, she played the so-called cocotte.

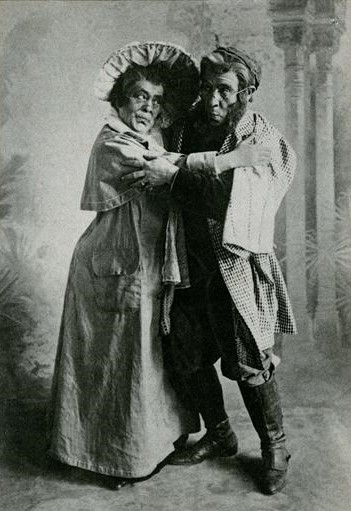
Josefa de Oliveira and António Pinheiro in the comedy Vénus at the Teatro D. Amélia, in 1906

In 1895, in a company led by António de Sousa Bastos, she went on tour to Rio de Janeiro, where she stayed from July to October. There she decided to return to operetta, although her voice was continuing to grow weaker. However, she was successful with the public, especially in comedy roles. The Brazilian newspaper A Notícia, wrote that she was "(...) very comfortable in the role of an astute and unlikely dancer". In July 1899 she went on tour to the Azores with the company of the Society of Portuguese Dramatic Artists, doing a season at the Teatro Angrense, in Angra do Heroísmo, together with Lucinda Simões and her daughter Lucília Simões.

She returned to the Ginásio and stayed there for several years, before signing up, in around 1904, with the Teatro D. Amélia, at the request of the Viscount of São Luís de Braga, who was the theatre's director. This period was characterized by countless conflicts, with the actors accusing the viscount of artistic insensitivity and the payment of meagre salaries. This led to the departure of several big names to the D. Maria II National Theatre and the total reorganization of the company. De Oliveira moved shortly afterwards to Porto.

== Death ==
De Oliveira never married nor had any children. She died on 17 April 1909 at her residence, in the parish of Sé in Porto. Her death certificate states that she was 55 years old. She is buried in the Cemetery of Prado do Repouso in that city.

The actress had a close relationship with the actor António Pinheiro for ten years, who, according to him, almost went crazy after her death, which occurred at the same time as conflicts that occurred at the Teatro D. Amélia, and the death of his mother on the day of De Oliveira's funeral, the day on which he was also required to perform comedy at the Teatro do Príncipe Real, in Porto.
