= Amélia Barros =

Portuguese actress and singer (1842-1929)

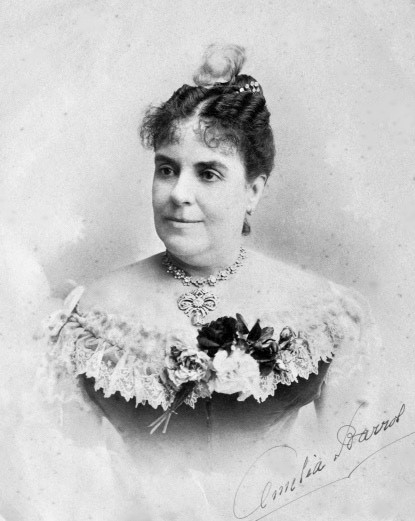
- Barros in the 1890s
- Born: Amélia Augusta da Assunção Barros; 9 March 1842; Lisbon, Portugal
- Died: 9 January 1929 (aged 86); Lisbon
- Resting place: Prazeres Cemetery, Lisbon
- Occupation(s): actress and lyrical singer
- Years active: 55
- Spouse: António Pereira
- Parent(s): José Inácio de Barros and Angélica Lúcia do Espírito Santo Santana

Amélia Augusta da Assunção Barros, better known as Amélia Barros (1842 – 1929) was a Portuguese actress and lyrical singer, known for excelling in operettas in both Portugal and Brazil.

== Early life ==
Barros was born on 9 March 1842, on Rua da Cruz a Rilhafoles, in the parish of Pena in the Portuguese capital of Lisbon. She was the daughter of José Inácio de Barros and his wife, Angélica Lúcia do Espírito Santo Santana. At the age of 16, on 7 July 1858, in the Church of Santa Isabel, Lisbon, she married António Pereira, a soldier born in the municipality of Lamego in the north of the country, who was 16 years her elder.

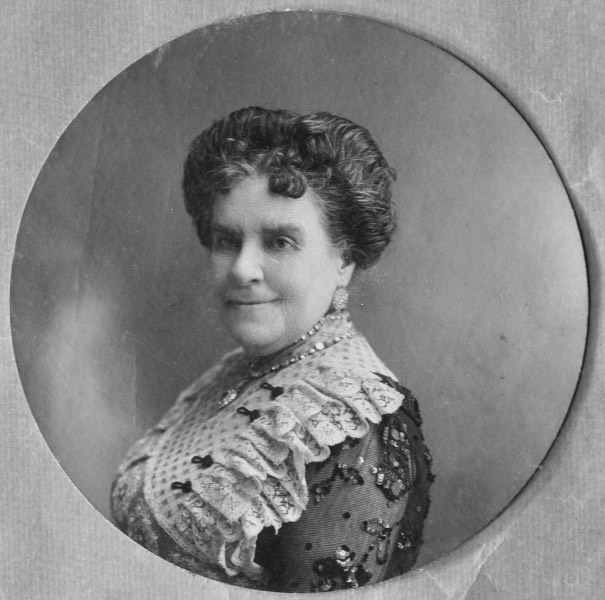
Amélia Barros at 68

== Career ==
She began her acting career as an amateur actress in 1860, at the Teatro da Esperança in Funchal on the island of Madeira. She then moved to the Azores where she stayed for a few years in Ponta Delgada on São Miguel Island and received much appreciation in the drama Os Homem Ricos (The Rich Men), by Ernesto Biester. In 1875, she made her debut at the Teatro do Príncipe Real, in Porto, in the operetta Joan of Arc, with music by Gomes Cardim, with great success. She then moved to the Teatro da Rua dos Condes in Lisbon, where she performed the 3-act comedy A Tia Maria. On 7 September 1876, she joined the Teatro da Trindade in Lisbon and there performed Um Favor de Procópio, a comedy in one act; Nem Quero ao Mar by Quirino Chaves; Valentim o Diabrete, a comic opera in three acts, and Amazonas de Tormes, a zarzuela. When Delfina do Espírito Santo left the theatre, she replaced her in the role of Queen Clementina in Bluebeard (1880), a burlesque opera in three acts with music by Jacques Offenbach. In 1882, at the Teatro do Rato in Lisbon, she performed a revival of A Tia Maria.

In 1885, Barros went on tour to Brazil, returning to the Trindade in 1887, where she remained until 1919. Among her performances in this theatre, she appeared in O Homem da Bomba, a three-act vaudeville, and created the role of Zepherine, in the 5-act drama Dois Garotos (Two boys), by Pierre Decourcelle. In 1898, she played Joaquina, in Falar Verdade a Mentir (Telling truth to lie), a comedy by Almeida Garrett, and appeared in Boccacio, a 3-act comic opera with music by Franz von Suppé. The same year, she joined an artistic company organized by António de Sousa Bastos to perform in Brazil. In 1900, back at the Trindade, she shone in the role of Carlota in O Homem das Mangas (The Mango Man).

After that she became a member of the Companhia de Ópera Cómica Portuguesa, the Companhia da Trindade, the Companhia Taveira and several other Lisbon theatre companies, acting alongside some of the best-known actresses of 19th century Portuguese theatre, such as Auzenda de Oliveira, Maria Matos, Palmira Bastos, Mercedes Blasco, Zulmira Miranda, and Ana Pereira. In this period she performed in many highly successful operettas, comedies, revues and musicals by Portuguese and international writers and composers, including Franz Lehár. In 1914 she again went on tour to Brazil, to much acclaim.

== Death ==
Already retired from the theatre, Barros died in Lisbon on 9 January 1929 of natural causes She was buried in a tomb at the Prazeres Cemetery in Lisbon. She had one son.
