= Rosa Damasceno =

Portuguese actress (1845–1904)

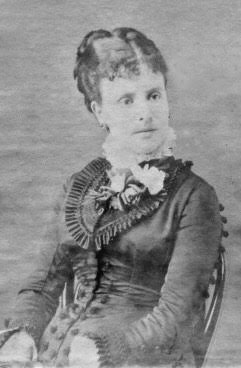
- Damasceno in 1875
- Born: Rosa Angélica Damasceno Rosado; 23 February 1845; São Pedro da Cova, Portugal
- Died: 5 October 1904 (aged 59); Mafra, Portugal
- Resting place: Prazeres Cemetery, Lisbon
- Occupation: Actress
- Spouse: Eduardo Brazão
- Children: Manuel Maria Damasceno Rosado (father unknown)

Rosa Damasceno (23 February 1845 – 5 October 1904) was a Portuguese actress, active in the latter half of the 19th century and known for her relationship with King Luís I of Portugal.

== Early life ==
Rosa Angélica Damasceno Rosado Brazão was born on 23 February 1845, in São Pedro da Cova, North Portugal. She was the daughter of Francisco de Paula Damasceno Rosado, a military man from Porto, and his second wife, Maria da Conceição de Macedo, from Lisbon. After her father's early death, she went with her mother to the southern Alentejo region, where she joined a travelling company as an actress. Together with this company, Damasceno performed at several provincial theatres, until Marcolino Pinto Ribeiro, a former actor at the D. Maria II National Theatre, seeing her perform, advised her and her mother to go to Lisbon, and introducing her to the royal commissioner, Dr. Luís da Costa Pereira.

== Acting career ==
Her presence in Lisbon reached the ears of businessman, Francisco Palha, who was soon to open the new Teatro da Trindade. She made her professional debut on the first night of the Trindade, 30 November 1867, performing in two plays and being well-received by the audience. Staying at the Trindade she performed in a wide variety of genres and soon became recognised as the leading ingénue of the Lisbon theatre scene. The impresario and journalist, António de Sousa Bastos, wrote about her elegance, beauty, distinction, charming voice, expressive look, and clear intelligence, "everything that the stage demands".

Damasceno then went to the D. Maria II National Theatre, which had awarded the management contract to the Biester, Brazão company, with which she was contracted. When she came on the stage for the opening recitation, there were many complaints from the audience in the form of shouting, whistling and stamping. These were not directed at her but at the government for removing the manager of this state-owned theatre, José Carlos dos Santos, and giving a contract to a private company. In a short time, however, Damasceno's performance made the audience forget their complaints and they ended up warmly applauding her.

Damasceno won numerous admirers, of which the most famous was King Luís I. People speculated that her only son, Manuel Maria Damasceno Rosado, born in 1867 and baptised as the son of an unknown father, was the King's son. In addition to buying her a house on Avenida da Liberdade, the main thoroughfare of Lisbon, gave her the Quinta de Santana (Santana Farm) in the parish of Gradil, near Mafra, where he also had a small theatre built. He also provided her with a monthly stipend.

On 15 April 1893, she married actor Eduardo Brazão (King D. Luís I died in 1889). Later, she became part of the cast of the Rosas & Brazão theatre company. She moved to the Teatro D. Amélia, remaining at this theatre from 1898 until her death, and considerably increasing her enormous repertoire. In 1892, she toured Brazil, performing in São Paulo, Rio de Janeiro and Juiz de Fora. Her last play was L'Adversaire by Alfred Capus and Emmanuel Arène, which started showing in March 1904, where she played alongside Lucília Simões, Jesuína Saraiva and others.

== Death ==
Rosa Damasceno died in Quinta de Santana, where she spent her summers, on 5 October 1904. Her coffin was taken to Lisbon by train. Her funeral was attended by about 2000 people from all walks of life. She was buried at Prazeres Cemetery in Lisbon.

== Awards and honours ==
- The theatre at Santarém was renamed in her honour, with patrons still remembering her brilliant performance there in 1894.
- Her name is part of the toponymy of Almada, Cascais, Gondomar and Seixal municipalities, as well in the parish of São Jorge de Arroios in Lisbon.
