= Agramonte Cemetery =

Cemetery in Porto, Portugal

- Cemitério de Agramonte
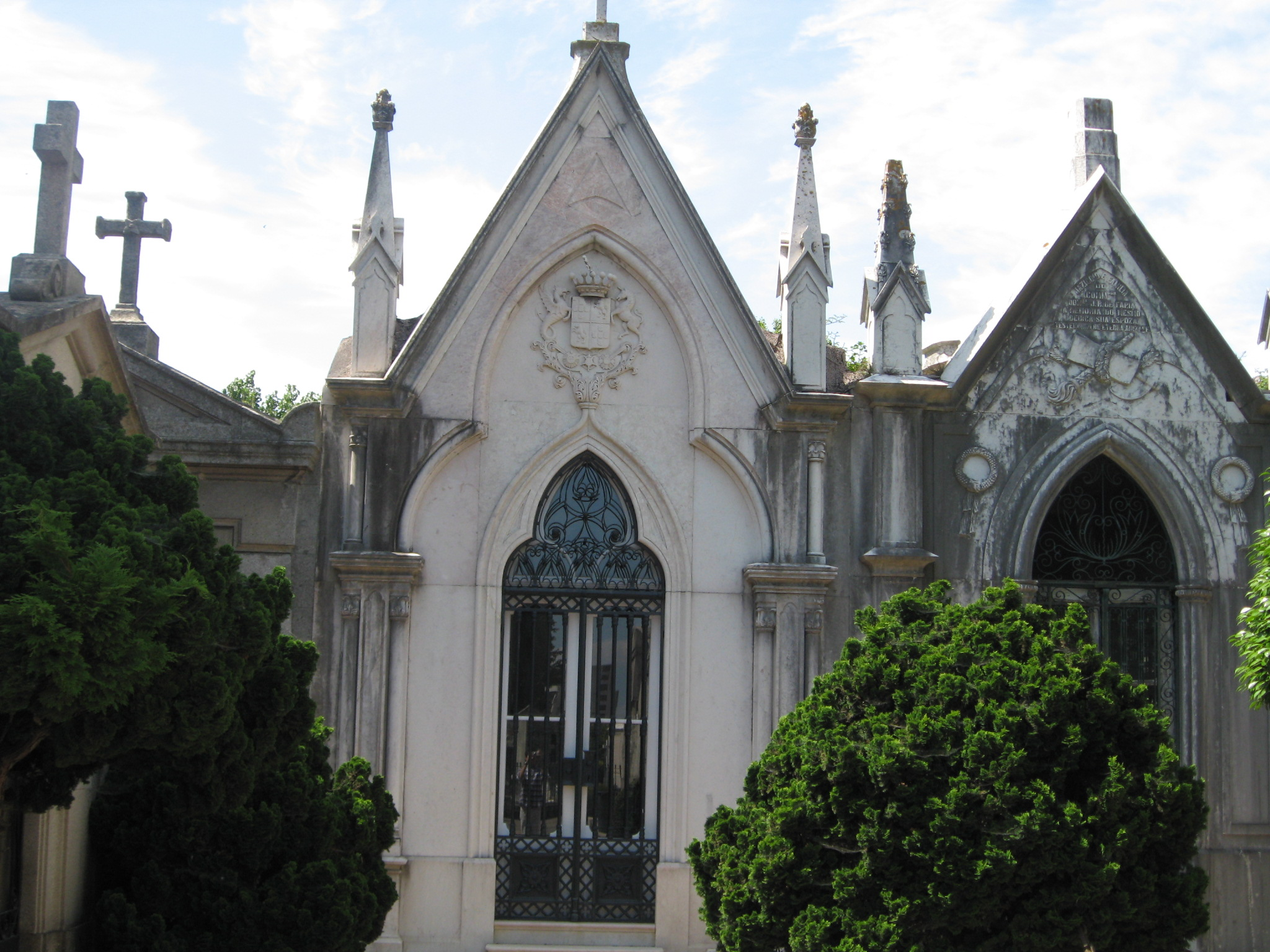

Details
- Established: 1855
- Location: Parish of Cedofeita, Santo Ildefonso, Sé, Miragaia, São Nicolau e Vitória, Porto
- Country: Portugal
- Coordinates: 41°09′2″N 8°37′56.4″W
- Owned by: Porto Municipality
- Size: 12 hectares (30 acres)

The Agramonte Cemetery is a cemetery in the city of Porto, in Portugal which dates back to 1855.

== History ==
The cemetery was opened in 1855, in the western part of the city. It was a public cemetery opened hastily in response to a cholera outbreak, for which the main cemetery of the city, the Cemetery of Prado do Repouso, which had opened sixteen years earlier, and the existing private cemeteries, proved unsuitable. The cemetery chapel was built between 1870 and 1874, designed by engineer Gustavo Adolfo Gonçalves, and expanded in 1906 by architect José Marques da Silva. The Byzantine-style frescoes were the work of Italian painter Silvestro Silvestri, in 1910.The cemetery contains private cemeteries of three Religious orders; the Carmelites, the Order of Friars Minor and the Trinitarians, who had negotiated with Porto City Council to have private areas within Agramonte to replace their cemeteries, which were in danger of being closed down. In the 1870s the authorities started to allow the erection of monuments and family mausoleums, which attracted more-affluent families to the cemetery, which had previously been used mainly by poorer people. Agramonte Cemetery is surrounded by a high stone wall. Its area is about 12 hectares.

== Burials ==
The cemetery contains a large memorial to the 120 victims of a fire that destroyed the Teatro Baquet in 1888. It is constructed largely from pieces of the theatre building that survived the fire. Several well-known people are buried in the cemetery, such as the archaeologist António Augusto da Rocha Peixoto, the cellist Guilhermina Suggia, the filmmaker Manoel de Oliveira and the actress Emília Eduarda. The tombs, with works by António Soares dos Reis and António Teixeira Lopes, provide a representative collection of Portuguese sculptural work.

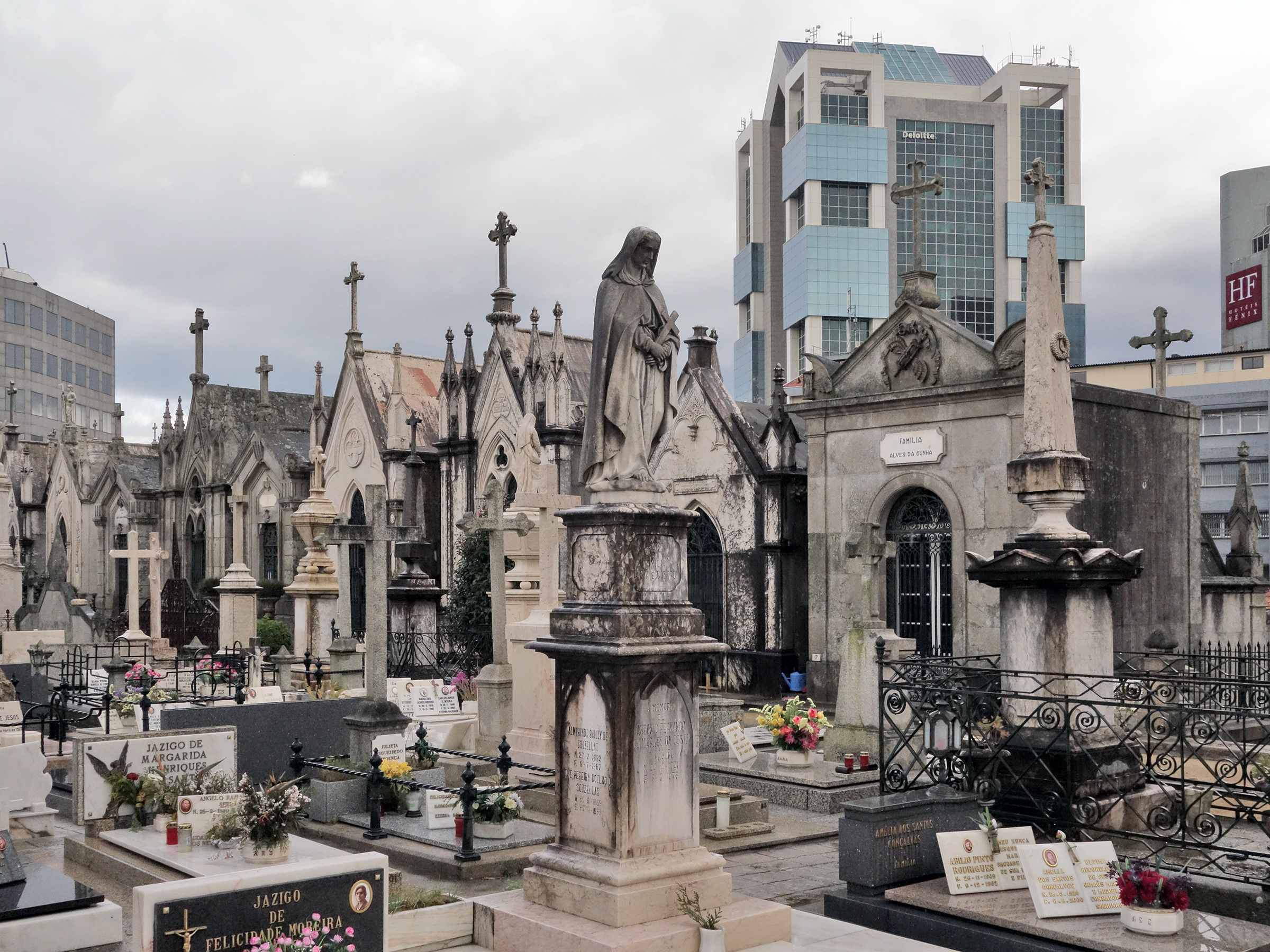
Tombs and mausoleums in the cemetery

Burials include:

- Abigail de Paiva Cruz (1883–1944), painter, sculptor and activist
- António Augusto da Rocha Peixoto (1866–1909), archaeologist
- António Carneiro (1872–1930), painter, poet and professor
- Berta Alves de Sousa (1906–1997), pianist and composer
- Edgar Cardoso (1913–2000), civil engineer
- Emília Eduarda (1843–1908), actress and playwright
- Gonçalo Sampaio (1865–1937), professor, anthropologist and botanist
- Guilhermina Suggia (1885–1950), violinist
- Helena Sá e Costa (1913–2006), pianist
- Júlio Dinis (1839–1871), writer and doctor
- Luís Costa (1879–1960), composer, pianist and teacher
- Manoel de Oliveira (1908–2015), filmmaker
- Pedro Blanco López (1883–1919), composer, pianist and teacher
- Pedro de Oliveira (1823–1883), architect
- Tomásia Veloso (1864–1888), actress and singer
