= Pepa Martins de Abreu =

Portuguese actor and journalist

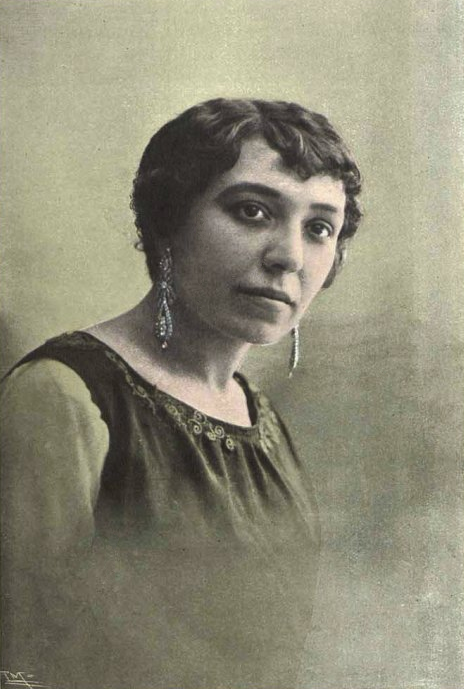
- Born: 6 July 1890; Lisbon, Portugal
- Died: 17 July 1962 (aged 72); Lisbon
- Other names: Pepita de Abreu
- Occupation: Actress
- Known for: Acting, directing and journalism
- Spouse: Melo Vieira
- Parent: Emília de Abreu (mother)

Pepa Martins de Abreu (stage name, Pepita de Abreu) (1890 –1962) was a Portuguese actress, journalist, translator and writer.

== Early life ==
Pepa Martins de Abreu Melo Vieira was born in the Portuguese capital of Lisbon on 6 July 1890. She was the daughter of Emília de Abreu, also an actress. She became known in the artistic world as "Pepita de Abreu", making her debut at the Teatro da Rua dos Condes in Lisbon in 1905 and then performing at the Teatro Príncipe Real in Porto in 1907. She performed in several theatres in Lisbon and Porto and toured other locations, including the Azores Archipelago and Madeira. In 1909, she performed in the last variety show written by António de Sousa Bastos (1844-1911) and performed at the Teatro Avenida in Lisbon.

== Career ==
Abreu went to Brazil in 1919 with the company of Maria Matos and stayed there until 1946. In Rio de Janeiro she went into journalism and became a writer for the Jornal do Commercio and also wrote for journals such as Boa Noite, Boa Tarde and Manto de Arlequim. As a translator, she translated several comedies from French. In Brazil she married Melo Vieira, a colonel.

Having returned to Portugal in 1946, Abreu returned to the theatre in 1954 at the Teatro Variedades in Lisbon, as part of the Vasco Santana Company. Together with César Viana, she founded in 1956 the Círculo de Divulgação Teatral (Theatrical Dissemination Circle), which aimed to present original Portuguese plays, which she directed and also acted in.

== Death ==
Abreu died on 17 July 1962 in Lisbon.
