= Emília Eduarda =

Portuguese theatre actress and playwright (1843–1908)

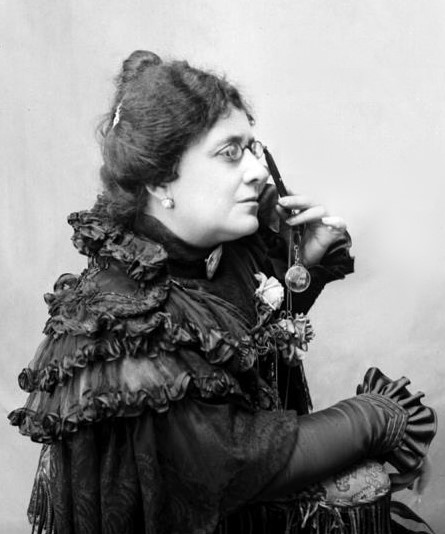
- Born: 1 January 1843; Lisbon, Portugal
- Died: 29 February 1908 (aged 65); Porto, Portugal
- Resting place: Agramonte Cemetery, Porto
- Other names: Emília Eduarda Augusta Cruz
- Occupation(s): Actress; playwright
- Years active: 40
- Known for: Lisbon and Porto theatrical performances; author of revue shows and comedies
- Spouses: Manuel Luís de Sousa; Francisco Casimiro de Magalhães Cruz

Emília Eduarda Augusta Cruz, better known as Emília Eduarda (1843 —1908), was a Portuguese actress, poet, playwright, and writer who performed on most of the major stages in Lisbon and Porto.

== Early life ==
Eduarda was born on 1 January 1843 in the Portuguese capital of Lisbon, in the former parish of Anjos, the daughter of unknown parents. The record of her baptism, which took place seven months after her birth, only states that she was taken to the church by Maria Joaquina, wife of António Luís, who had received the baby from a midwife named Maria do Carmo. Little is known about Eduarda's childhood. At the age of just thirteen, she married Manuel Luís de Sousa who was in the military and came from Lisbon, with a mother from the Azores.

== Theatrical career ==
Eduarda began her artistic career at the age of 14, as an amateur actress, at the Teatro Terpsicore, successfully playing roles of different genres in the comedies Homem de Ouro, in 3 acts, by José da Silva Mendes Leal, Útil e Agradável and Moleira de Marly, both in one act. Her husband was posted to the Portuguese colony of São Tomé Island, where he died in 1859, making her a widow at sixteen.

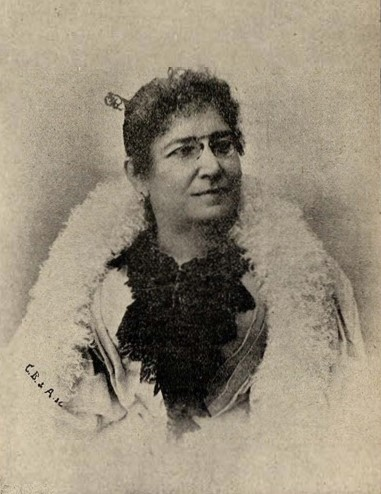
Portrait published in 1896

She was invited by Actor Taborda to join the company at the Teatro do Ginásio, where she made her professional debut on the night of 1 October 1861 in the comedy A esposa deve acompanhar seu marido (The wife must accompany her husband) by Júlio César Machado, in which she achieved great success. In the same year, she played at the Teatro D. Fernando, in the play Le moulin des tilleuls (The lime trees mill) by Aimé Maillart. She then returned to the Ginásio, before moving on to the Teatro do Príncipe Real in 1865. From there she moved to the Teatro da Rua dos Condes and then to the D. Maria II National Theatre. This was followed by a tour to Madeira and the Azores.

After this tour she returned to mainland Portugal, settling in Porto, where she performed dramas, comedies and farces while working with several different companies. Particularly notable were her performances in Thérèse Raquin, by Émile Zola, Le Médecin malgré lui by Molière, and La Poupée by Maurice Ordonneau. Eduarda was a regular presence on the stages of the Teatro Baquet, Teatro Carlos Alberto and Teatro do Príncipe Real. In 1895, she accompanied the company of the impresario, Afonso Taveira, to Brazil.

== Writing ==
In 1886 Eduarda was the first woman to write a revue, known in Portugal as Teatro de Revista, or a magazine show. It was called Cartas na Mesa (Cards on the table) and was specifically targeted at the people of Porto. She also wrote numerous comedies such as O Sobrinho da América (The American nephew); O Sentinela (The Sentinel); a three-act satire, O Processo de El-Rei Dinheiro; an operetta O Senhor e a Senhora Diniz (Mr and Mrs Diniz) and a revue O Diabo a Quatro (The Devil in Four). She translated many other plays. Eduarda also wrote Contos Simples (Simple Stories), published in 1895, as well as poetry. The first poem recited in public by the noted Portuguese actor António Pedro was written by her.

== Personal life ==
Eduarda married for a second time at the age of 58, on 26 January 1901, in the Church of Saint Ildefonso in Porto. Her husband was a wealthy merchant, Francisco Casimiro de Magalhães Cruz.

== Death ==
On 29 February 1908, in Porto, she fell victim to a cerebral edema after having recited on stage. She died at home on the same day. She was buried in Porto's Agramonte Cemetery, in a tomb embellished with a statue by António Teixeira Lopes, a local sculptor, called The Sleep of Innocence. An obituary in the newspaper, O Occidente, read: "The actress Emilia Eduarda is one of the most brilliant figures in the history of Portuguese theatre, for how much she distinguished herself in it." Eduarda's name was given to a street in the parish of Penha de França in Lisbon and to one in Charneca de Caparica.
