= Teatro Angrense =

Theatre in the Azores, Portugal

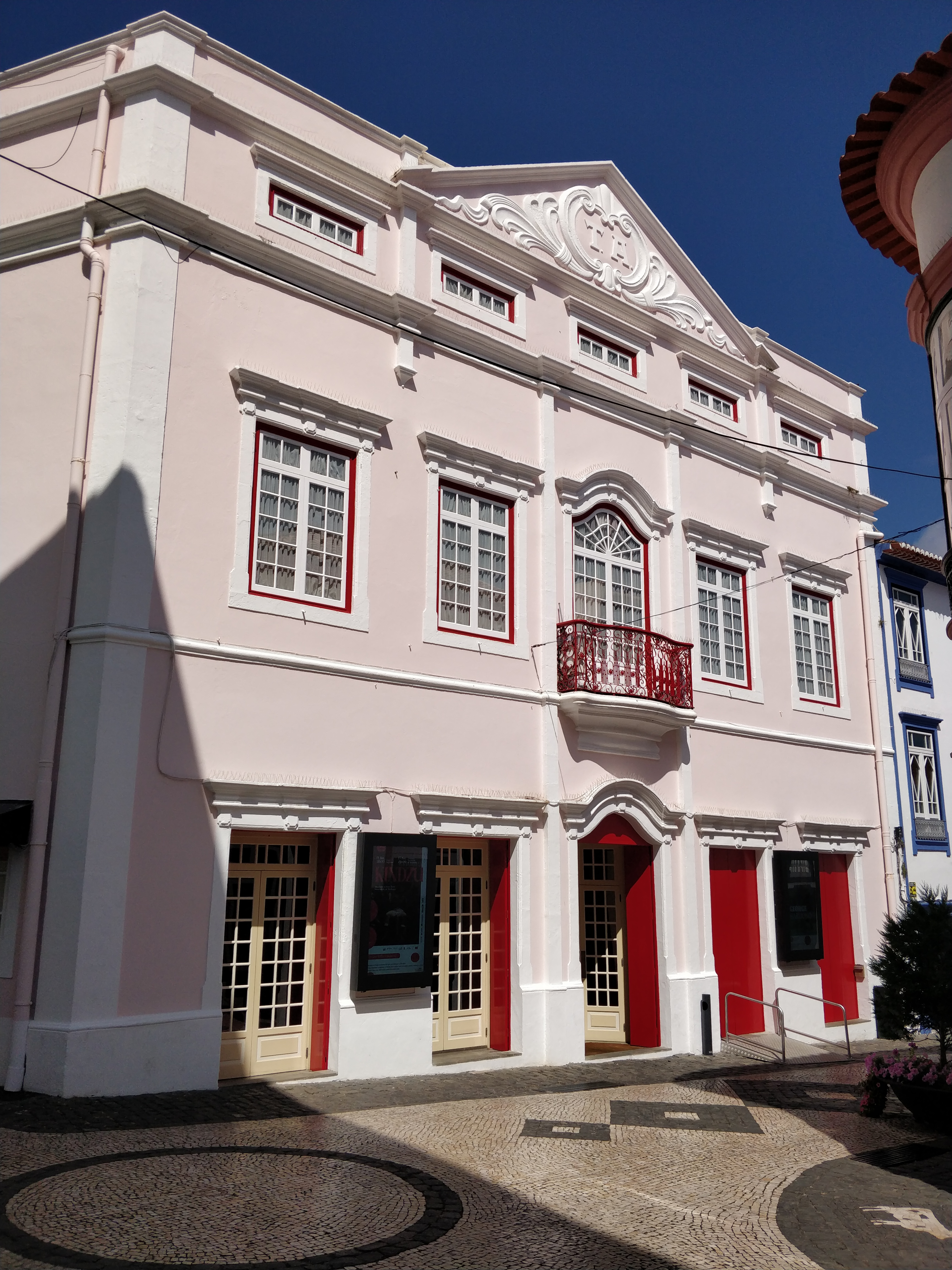
- Interactive map of Teatro Angrense
- Address: Rua da Esperança; Angra do Heroísmo, Terceira Island, Azores; Portugal
- Coordinates: 38°39′22″N 27°13′17″W
- Capacity: 507

Construction
- Opened: 22 November 1860
- Architect: Eduardo Gomes da Silva

The Teatro Angrense is located on Rua da Esperança in the historic centre of Angra do Heroísmo, on Terceira Island, in the Azores, Portugal. The town centre is a UNESCO World Heritage Site. The theatre is the town's main performance venue.

== History ==
On the land where the theatre stands, there was a building in 1599 that served as a warehouse for imported goods. There, in a box of products from India, the outbreak of an epidemic of bubonic plague that devastated the city that year was alleged to have begun. The City Council decided to burn down the building, which remained in ruins until the 1850s. The first stone for the new theatre was laid there on 2 October 1855, in a ceremony that formed part of the acclamation celebrations of D. Pedro V as King of Portugal. The theatre, which was modelled on the Teatro do Ginásio in Lisbon, was officially opened on 22 November 1860. Two years later, a group of shareholders was formed to run the Angrense.

The theatre, in a horseshoe shape, included 50 boxes arranged on three floors, 152 seats in the stalls, 63 chairs, a small hall on the upper floor, a stage and 14 dressing rooms. These facilities proved to be small and uncomfortable: the stage was small and the dressing rooms were excessively humid. The architecture, both its neoclassical exterior and interior, was poor compared to the rest of the city, which was growing at the beginning of the 20th century. The management therefore proposed to expand its facilities. The approved project was given to the architect Eduardo Gomes da Silva, with work beginning in 1919, which gave it its present appearance, and increased the capacity to 927, arranged on four floors. The inauguration took place on 19 March 1926, with a presentation by the Companhia Teatral Maria Matos - Nascimento Fernandes from Lisbon. From that time the theatre also had the capacity to show films.

The building withstood the earthquake of 1 January 1980, without major damage, but some repairs were necessary without any significant changes to its design. The Teatro Angrense was classified as a Property of Public Interest in 1989. In the 1990s, ownership was taken over by the City Council and it underwent some remodelling.

== Performers ==
While mainly used for local theatre groups and performers, the theatre has also attracted entertainers from the Portuguese mainland and from Spain. These included Carolina Falco, Josefa de Oliveira, Maria das Dores, Lucinda Simões, Lucília Simões, Palmira Bastos, Maria Matos and her young daughter, Maria Helena, Amélia Rey Colaço, Vasco Santana, and João Villaret. More recently, there have been performances by the Portuguese fado singers, Amália Rodrigues and Carlos do Carmo, by Rita Guerra, and by the musical group Deolinda. The only play written by the Portuguese poet and writer, Vitorino Nemésio, was performed at the Angrense for the first time in 1920.
