= Clara de Resende =

Portuguese artist (1855–1933)

- Born: Claire Wilson de Rezende; 24 November 1855; Paris, France
- Died: 19 December 1933 (aged 78); Porto, Portugal
- Known for: Painting
- Movement: Naturalism

Clara de Resende (1855–1933), born Claire Wilson de Rezende, was a Portuguese painter who had only a brief career due to illness. The daughter of the painter, sculptor, and professor of fine arts, Francisco José Resende, her name was given to a secondary school in Porto.

== Early life ==
Resende was born in Paris and registered under the name Claire Wilson de Rezende on 24 November 1855. She was the daughter of the Romantic painter, sculptor, and professor of fine arts, Francisco José Resende, (1825–1893), a native of Porto, and of Caroline Wilson, who was English and had met Francisco Resende when he was visiting London. Clara's father came from an upper-middle-class family in Porto. He had already achieved national recognition as an artist, with patrons including high-ranking and influential figures in Portuguese society such as King Ferdinand II. However, his second stay in Paris proved less successful, as he failed to exhibit his works. Shortly after his daughter was born, he and Wilson separated, and a few months later he returned to Porto with Clara. It appears that she remained in contact with her mother, as there is a copy of a message from her father reminding her to write to her mother. Integrated into the circles of Porto's cultural and intellectual elite from a young age, she was recognized by the local press with various periodicals reporting that she would always accompany her father, whether he was exhibiting or visiting galleries, museums and art exhibitions, attending shows, plays, literary salons, or simply carrying out everyday tasks such as buying materials for his paintings.

Resende attended a small school in Porto, run by a Madame Rozalia. Demonstrating an early interest in drawing and painting, at the age of twelve she became a pupil of her father, beginning to study and work with various artistic techniques such as chiaroscuro and sfumato, as well as with different materials, such as pastel and oil paint. Her father exhibited a portrait of her at the Exposition Universelle in Paris in 1867.

== Exhibitions and artistic career ==
Deciding to follow in her father's footsteps, her first works were exhibited in 1869, with four of her drawings being presented at the triennial exhibition of the Academy of Fine Arts of Porto, where her father was a professor. Her drawings, all portraits, done with a stump, represented both historical and classical figures such as Alexander the Great and contemporary figures such as the Porto architect and artist Manuel José Carneiro. In 1874 and 1878 she again exhibited at the triennial exhibition, presenting several still life oil paintings and charcoal drawings, adopting naturalism and realism as her own style. In 1877, she also participated in a painting exhibition to reveal young talents from Porto, held at Porto's Crystal Palace.

== Degenerative disease and last works ==
Despite being gifted, Resende had a short artistic life. Before she was 30 she began to suffer from several illnesses including a degenerative disease that deformed her hands. Despite her physical limitations, and with sporadic trips to Paris and the Pyrenees for treatment, she managed in the following years to contribute some works to the Volunteer Firefighters' Bazaar in 1880 and the Fine Arts Bazaar held at the Crystal Palace in 1882. In 1885 and 1888, she participated respectively in the bazaar of the Porto Liberal Association and the Crystal Palace Exhibition dedicated to decorative arts.

== Death ==
Resende was looked after by her father until his death in 1893, after which she moved to one of the hospitals of the Santa Casa da Misericórdia in Porto. She died on 19 December 1933, and was buried in the Agramonte Cemetery of Porto, next to her father.

== Tributes and legacy ==
Her works are currently mainly in private collections. In 1978 a school that offered technical education to girls in Porto was renamed as the Colégio Estadual Clara de Resende.
