= Jesuína Saraiva =

Portuguese stage actor in the 19th and 20th centuries

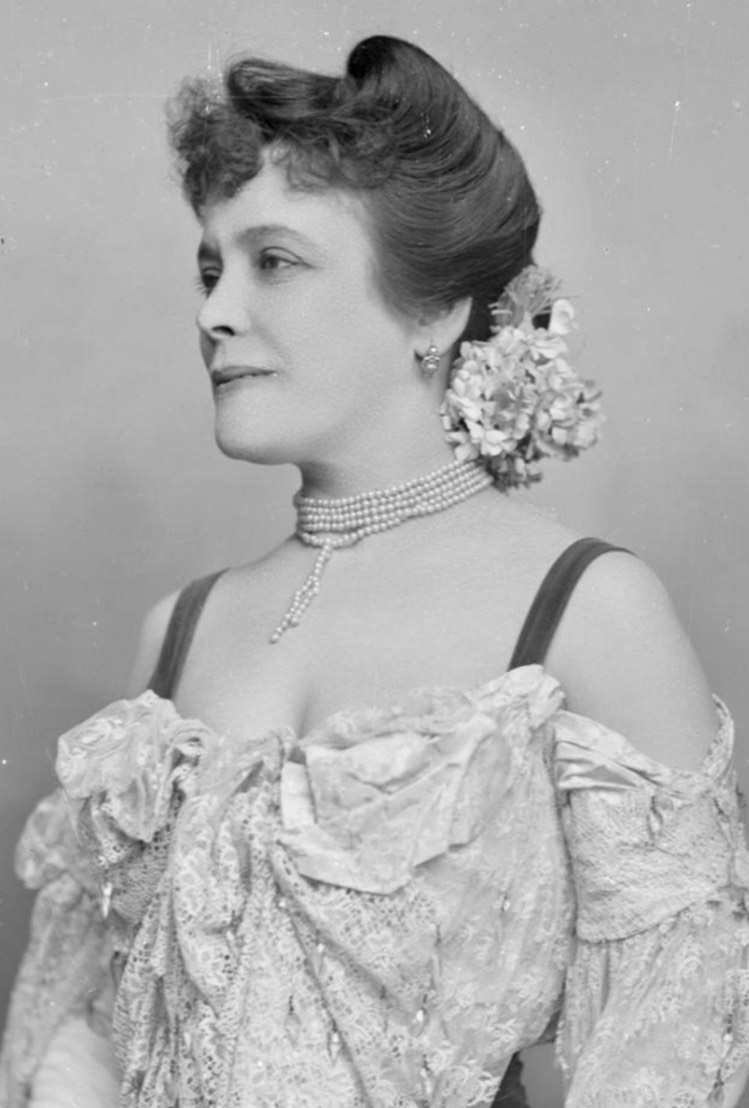
- Born: Jesuína Pereira de Oliveira; 11 November 1865; Lisbon, Portugal
- Died: 13 October 1947 (aged 81); Lisbon, Portugal
- Resting place: Alto de São João Cemetery, Lisbon
- Other names: Jesuína Pereira de Oliveira Saraiva de Chaby Pinheiro
- Occupation: Actor
- Years active: 50
- Known for: Portuguese theatre
- Spouse(s): (1) Manuel José Saraiva; (2) Chaby Pinheiro

Jesuína Saraiva (1865–1947) was a popular Portuguese actress and wife of the famous actor Chaby Pinheiro.

== Early life ==
Jesuína Pereira de Oliveira Saraiva de Chaby Pinheiro, who also used the name Jesuína de Chaby, was born in the Portuguese capital of Lisbon on 11 November 1865. She was the illegitimate daughter of José Francisco Pereira and Maria José de Oliveira, who came from Porto. Saraiva was left at the Santa Casa da Misericórdia de Lisboa, a Portuguese religious charity, when she was 3 months old. She was only rescued and formally recognized by her parents on 27 June 1867. Saraiva attended drama classes at the National Conservatory of Lisbon. She performed in public for the first time with the children's company of the Teatro da Rua dos Condes, which frequently did shows on the private stages of the nobility. In 1884, she was at Teatro do Ginásio in Lisbon playing a cross-gender role in a comedy. She married in May 1886 in Lisbon to a typographer, Manuel José Saraiva. She was widowed at the end of December 1905, not having had children.

== Professional career ==
In 1886 and 1887, Saraiva was a member of various acting groups that rented small theatres to give shows, performed in private theatres and went on tours around the country. She then worked at the Teatro do Príncipe Real, with considerable success. In 1900, she moved to the Teatro D. Amélia to work with the Rosas & Brazão company, where she stayed until 1904. In that year she registered at the Ginásio, where she stayed for a successful five years. In 1909 she returned to the D. Amélia, where she stayed until 1916. From 1918, she performed in several theatres in the capital, namely the D. Maria II National Theatre, Teatro Politeama and Teatro Avenida. In Porto, she performed at the Teatro Sá da Bandeira and at the Teatro Águia d'Ouro. She also toured the Portuguese Azores archipelago and Brazil, performing in São Paulo and Rio de Janeiro. In total she performed in 71 different shows. Saraiva made one film, Lisboa, Crónica Anedótica (Lisbon, Anecdotal Chronicle-1930), directed by José Leitão de Barros.

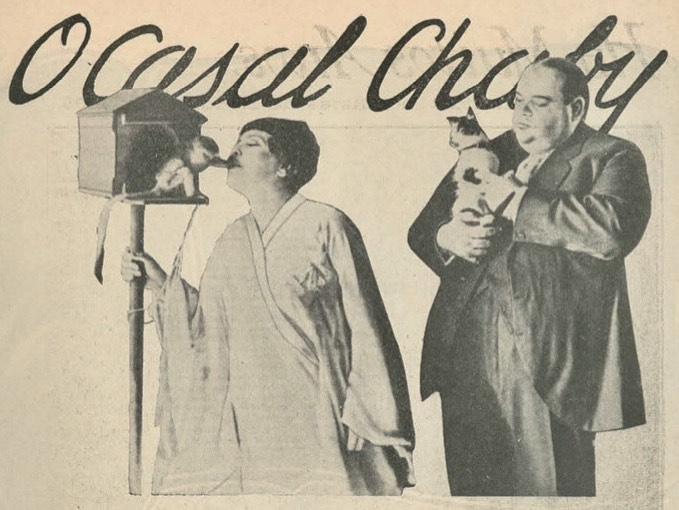
Saraiva with Chaby Pinheiro in a magazine article of 1923

In addition to Rosas & Brazão, she worked with various other theatre companies, including the Aura Abranches-Chaby Pinheiro company, the Cremilda-Chaby Pinheiro company, and the Chaby Pinheiro company. She married the actor and impresario Chaby Pinheiro on 17 March 1918, when she was 52 and they combined to form a new theatre company and to work together. He died on 6 December 1933. After being widowed for the second time she retired from public life, publishing in 1938 her husband's memoirs "Memories of Chaby", which he had been unable to complete during his lifetime. Saraiva died on 13 October 1947. She was buried in the family grave in the Alto de São João Cemetery, in Lisbon. Her name lives on in a street in the Sintra municipality, close to where she and Chaby Pinheiro had a house.

== Gallery ==
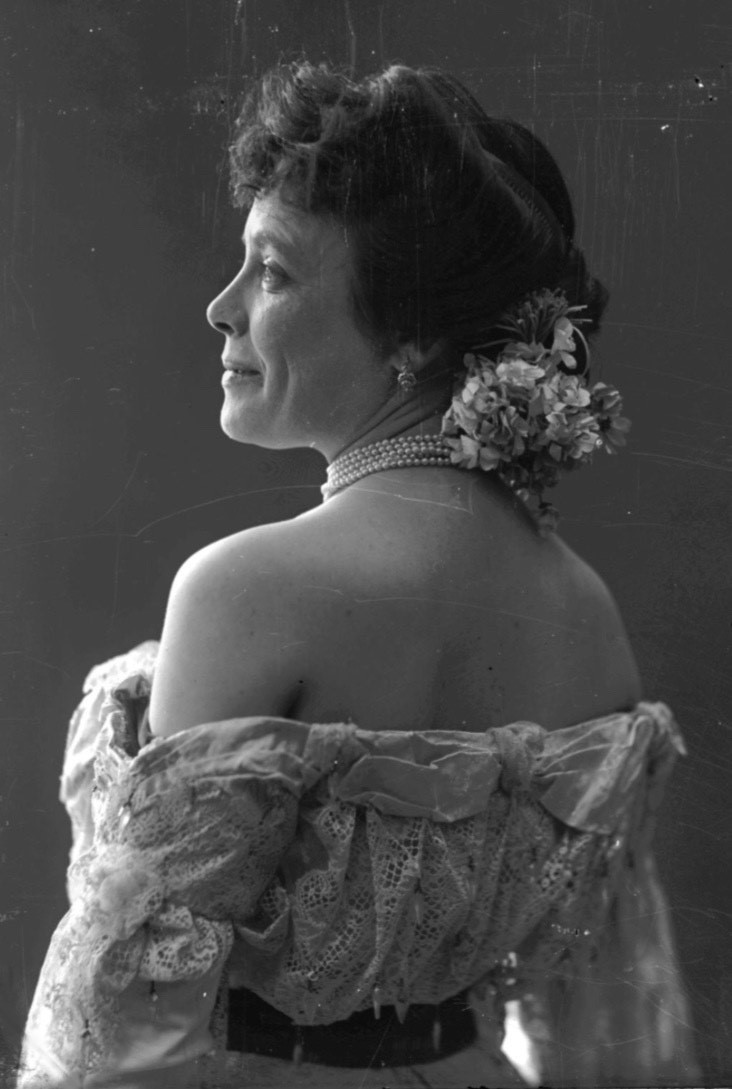
Jesuína Saraiva 1909

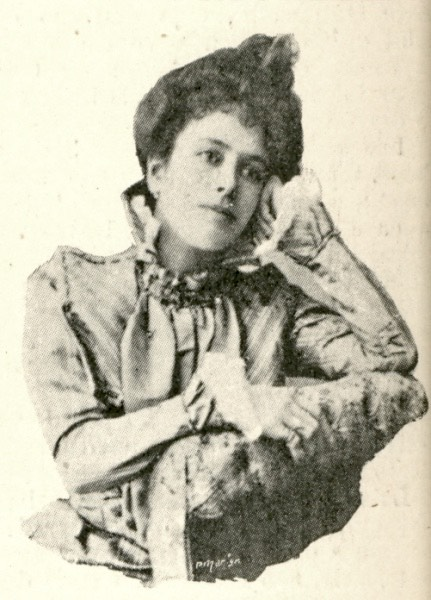
Jesuína Saraiva 1900

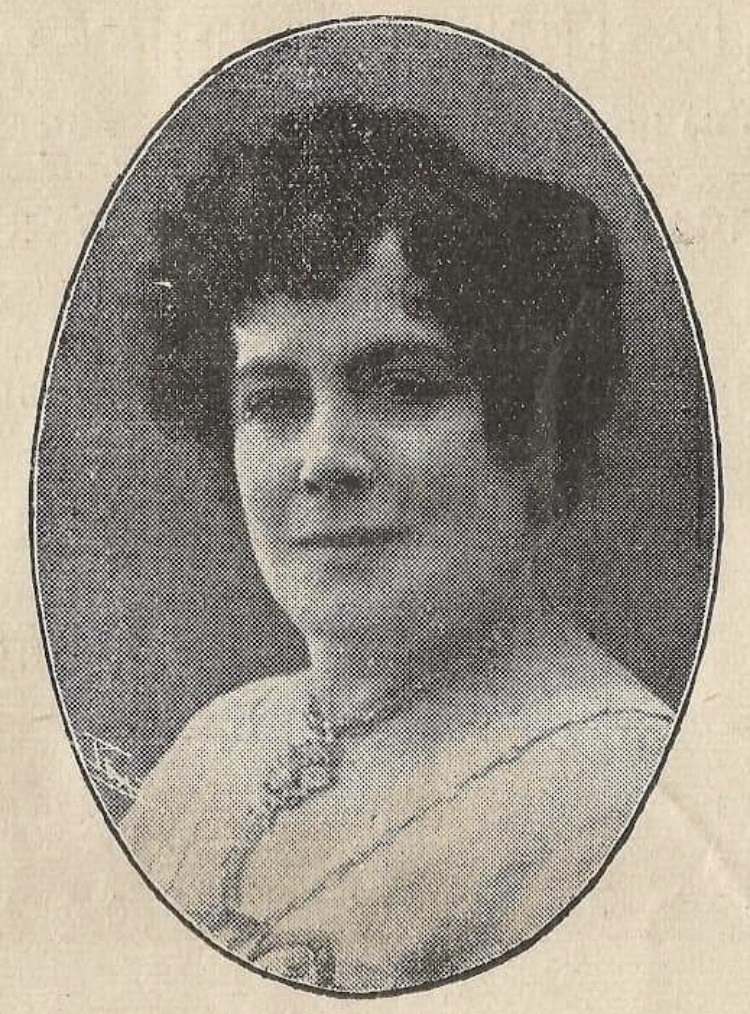
Jesuína Saraiva 1921

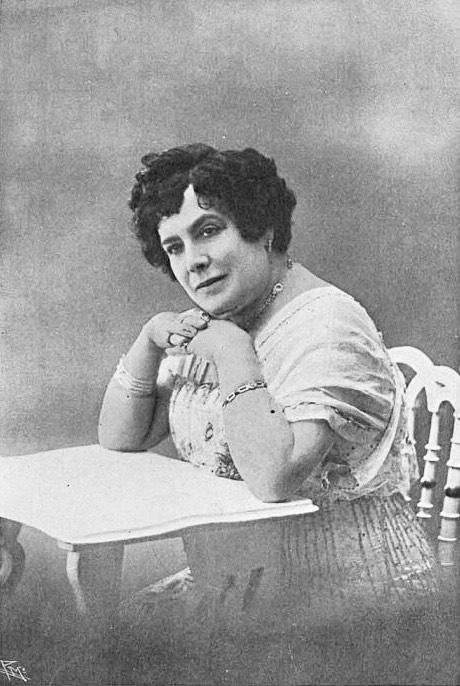
Jesuína Saraiva 1916

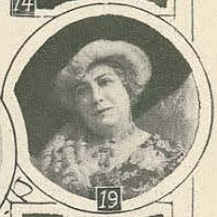
Jesuína Saraiva 1916

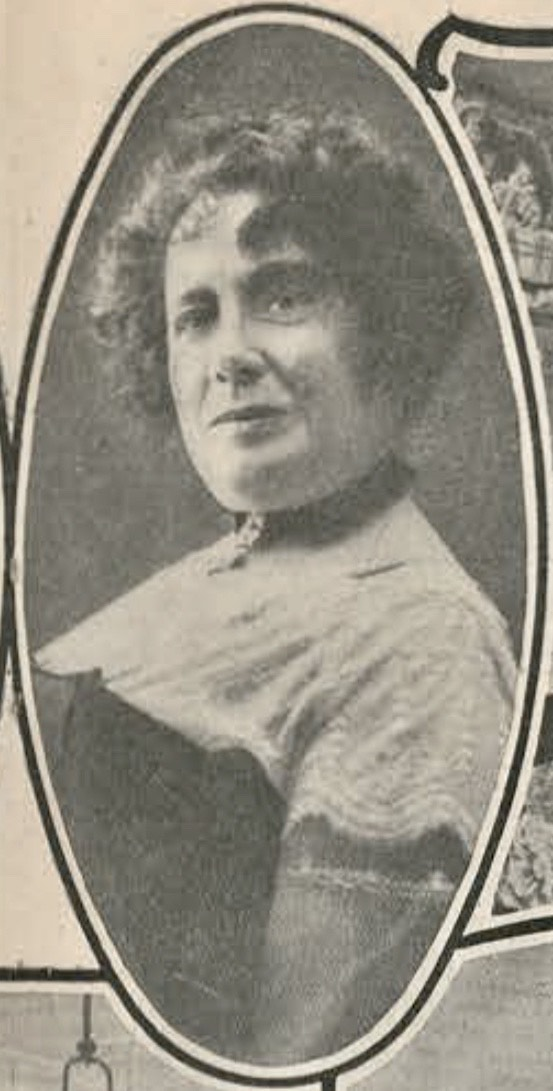
Jesuína Saraiva 1923

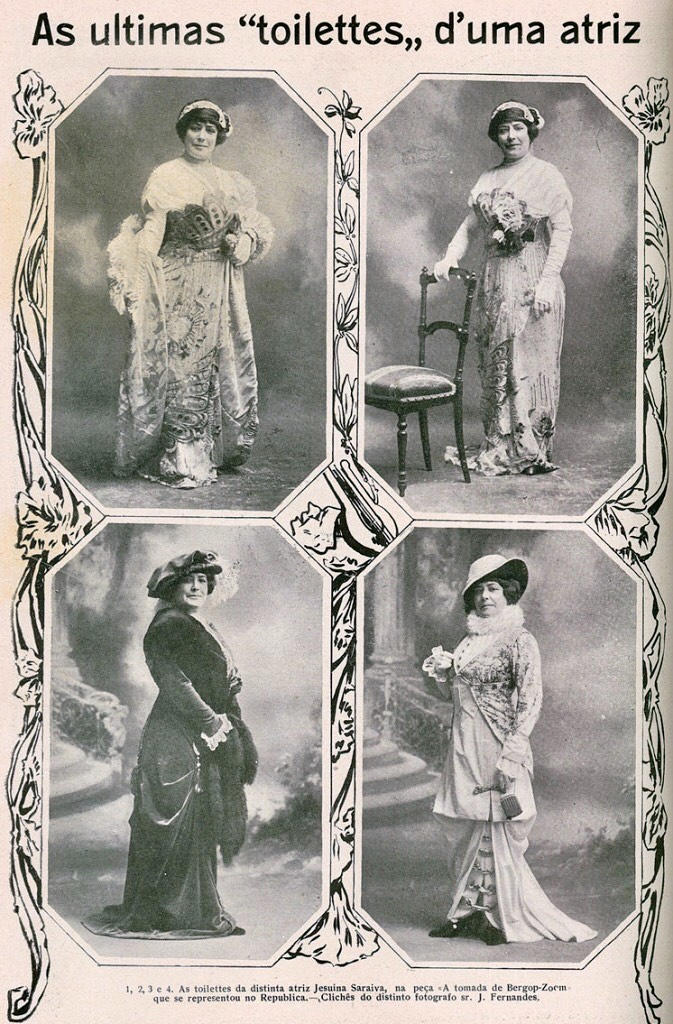
Jesuína Saraiva in costumes 1913
