= Tomásia Veloso =

Portuguese stage actress

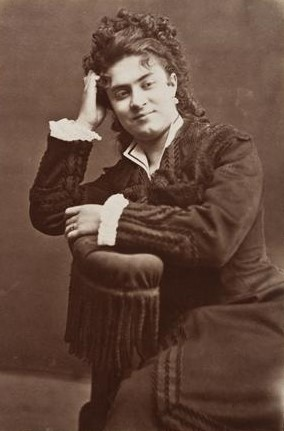
- Born: Tomásia Carlota de Jesus Alves; 22 April 1864; Lisbon, Portugal
- Died: 6 April 1888 Aged 23; Porto, Portugal
- Resting place: Agramonte Cemetery, Porto
- Occupations: Actress and operetta singer
- Known for: Portuguese theatre
- Children: One son

Tomásia Veloso (in the old spelling Thomazia Velloso), stage name of Tomásia Carlota de Jesus Alves (1864 –1888), was a Portuguese stage actress and operetta singer.

== Early life ==
Veloso was born on 22 April 1864 at 130, Rua de Santa Marta, in the former civil parish of Coração de Jesus in the Portuguese capital of Lisbon. She was the daughter of José Henrique Alves and Carlota Porfíria dos Santos Veloso, who were both actors. She made her debut in 1870, at the age of six, at a theatre in Setúbal, in the play Le Vieux Caporal (The old corporal) by Dumanoir and Adolphe d'Ennery, in which she played the son of the corporal. Shortly after, she left for Porto with her mother.

== Acting career ==
In 1878, António de Sousa Bastos, a leading figure in the Portuguese theatrical scene, formed a company to perform in the Teatro do Príncipe Real (later the Teatro Apolo in Lisbon. He was advised to send for a young woman from Porto who had reportedly shown great talent in small roles in a popular street theatre in Porto. He was surprised to find that the woman was Veloso, who he had seen perform on her debut in Setúbal. Another coincidence was that he had chosen the director of the Setúbal play, José Romano, to direct his new company. Within a short time of arriving in Lisbon, Veloso became a star.

In 1879 she returned to Porto, where she remained, mostly with the operetta company of the Teatro do Príncipe Real in that city, until her death. Her biggest successes were, in fact, in the operetta genre, although she was equally successful in drama and comedy. On 20 March 1888, there was a fire at the Teatro Baquet opposite where Veloso lived, destroying the theatre and killing around 120. Veloso spent hours at her window watching events unfold. Her last public performance was at a matinee at Porto's Crystal Palace, organized in support of the surviving victims of the fire.

== Death ==
Veloso died two weeks later, on 6 April 1888, at her home in 29 Rua de Sá da Bandeira. Although she was diagnosed with typhoid fever, it was thought that her exposure on the night of the fire was a contributory factor. She was buried in the Agramonte Cemetery in Porto and was much mourned by the press. Veloso did not marry but had a son, Mário (born 1882), whose father was unknown. The poet, Cesário Verde, was reportedly in love with her but his feelings were not reciprocated. That did not stop him being attacked by Oliveiro Grosso, who was her alleged lover. Veloso's mother died, penniless, in 1917.
