= Mercedes Blasco =

Portuguese stage actor and writer

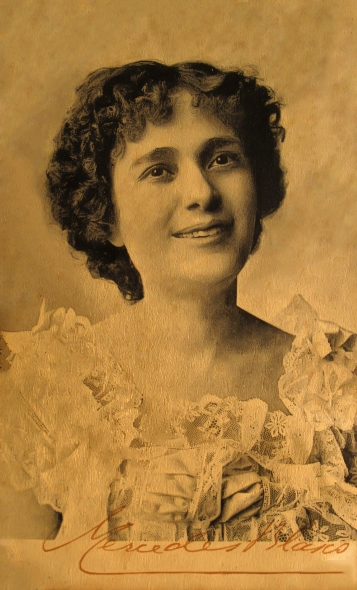
- Born: Conceição Vitória Marques; 4 September 1867; Mina de S. Domingos, Portugal
- Died: 12 April 1961 (aged 93); Lisbon
- Resting place: Prazeres cemetery, Lisbon
- Occupations: actor and writer
- Known for: Lisbon theatre performances, autobiographies
- Spouse: Remi Ghekiere
- Children: two sons (father, Augusto Peixoto)

Mercedes Blasco (4 September 1867 – 12 April 1961), pseudonym of Conceição Vitória Marques, was a popular Portuguese actress in operettas and variety shows. She was also a writer, being the first Portuguese actress to write her memoirs, a teacher, translator and journalist, as well as a volunteer nurse in World War I.

== Early life ==
Mercedes Blasco was born on 4 September 1867 (some sources say 1870) in the mining community of Mina de S. Domingos, located in the Alentejo region of Portugal, from where her mother's family came. When she was a few months old her family moved to Huelva in Spain, where her father was a train driver and where they lived until she was seven, when the family moved to the city of Porto in Portugal. She was brought up from a very early age with the idea that she would have a career in medicine and also mastered several foreign languages, which she would use frequently in her professional life.

== Beginning of theatrical career ==
Having studied in Porto as a primary school teacher, Blasco began her theatrical career in 1888 at the Teatro Chalet in Porto, having run away from home. At that time she used the pseudonym, Judith Mercedes. She then moved to what was then the Teatro do Príncipe Real in that city. With her reputation preceding her, she went to Lisbon and played at the Teatro do Rato, before returning to Porto. Coming from a conservative background, she chose to use pseudonyms to avoid social stigma. Her daring costumes and provocative roles would give rise to a series of scandals during her career. She returned to Lisbon in 1890 to join the company of the Teatro da Trindade. Her first performance there was in a vaudeville called Mademoiselle Nitouche. She also performed in operettas at the same theatre. In 1891, also at the Trindade, she performed in the play, Miss Helyett, considered by many to have been her best performance. At this time she also began to perform songs in French, to great acclaim.

== Scandal ==
In 1892–93, she moved briefly to the Teatro Avenida in Lisbon. Back at the Trindade she played in the operetta Sá de Albergaria. In this she sang Portuguese fados that she had composed. On one occasion the audience called her back for ten encores. Despite further successes at this theatre she returned to Porto when António de Sousa Bastos became the director of the Trindade and married her professional rival Palmira Bastos. Back in Lisbon in 1897 she caused scandal by bicycling from her home to the theatre, the first woman to use a bicycle in Lisbon. In the same year she went to Brazil with the Sousa Bastos company. In 1897, she joined Pedro Cabral's company, installed at the 4000-seat Coliseu dos Recreios in which she had several successes. Among these was Farroncas do Zé (1898) in which Blasco played 14 roles, among them the controversial Princess of Caraman-Chimay, in which she wore a Parisian maillot or leotard, the first time such a garment had been worn on a Portuguese stage. Many people considered it obscene. She also worked at the Teatro da Trindade between 1897 and 1903, also performing at the Teatro D. Amélia (now known as the Teatro São Luiz). Additionally, she organized a company of her own for a tour of Portuguese provinces.

In 1901, Blasco became pregnant, the father being the journalist Augusto Peixoto, with whom she was living. She performed while being pregnant, wearing clothes designed to disguise the pregnancy. She visited Madrid at the invitation of the Teatro Romea, where she performed French and Neapolitan songs, a repertoire that she repeated at the Teatro Marquez in Cartagena. The pregnancy added to her reputation for scandal, which was not diminished by her performance in 1902–03 in the show À Busca do Badalo (Searching for the clapper), the title of which, after seventy-five performances, was pronounced obscene, with the authorities enforcing a name change. She gave birth for a second time in 1905.

== Travels ==
In 1908 Blasco published a book entitled Memórias de uma actriz (Memories of an actress). The premature publication of a memoir, while still at the height of her career, was unusual but her notoriety meant that the book sold very well. Around this time Blasco began to undertake more frequent overseas trips. At the beginning of 1908 she went to Rio de Janeiro for the Brazilian National Exposition, where she had considerable success. She then went directly to Paris to begin a long season of touring that took in France, Italy, the United Kingdom, the Netherlands and Belgium. Her fluency in several languages served her well during the tour and she became very popular with members of several royal families, being asked to give command performances.

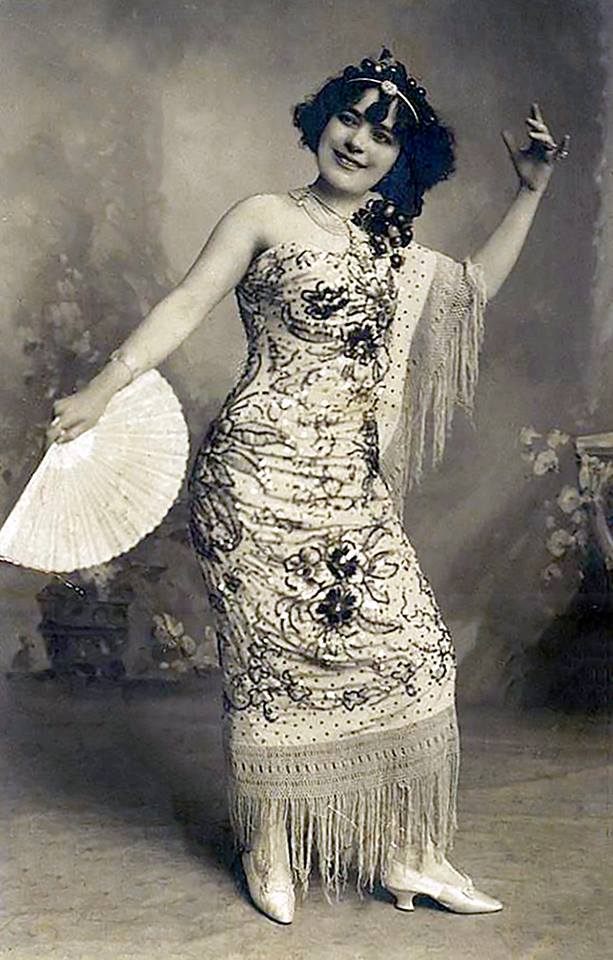
Blasco performing at the London Coliseum in 1909

== World War I ==
When World War I broke out she was living in Belgium, where she had married a Belgian electrical engineer, Remi Ghekiere. Her two sons, Stelio and Marcelo were with her. During World War I, she enlisted as a nurse with the Red Cross, and treated and helped repatriate Portuguese soldiers in Liège in 1918. She also did some teaching. In her book Vagabunda Mercedes she recounted the difficulties she experienced in Brussels during the war because she refused to perform before the German forces. At the end of the war Blasco returned to Lisbon as a widow with few resources. She found it difficult to find work on the stage as her age did not match the daring artistic performances that had made her famous as a young woman. Stelio had died in Brussels and the other son, Marcelo, was already very ill and was to die in June 1922 of tuberculosis. In the last months of her son's life they both lived on a small pension granted by the civil governor of Lisbon and on the meagre royalties from her books.

== Final years ==
As a means of support, she continued to write, eventually producing more than thirty works, consisting of autobiographies, novels, plays, and translations. In Vagabunda Mercedes she inserted a “feminist chapter”, advocating women's cultural and economic emancipation, universal suffrage, and equality between the sexes. She also worked as a journalist, writing for Lisbon newspapers O Século, A Capital, A Ilustração, and O Diário de Lisboa. However, the returns from writing were small and she lived a life of some poverty, particularly when compared with how she had lived as an actor. She was forced to live off the charity of some friends, such as the owner of a pastry shop in the Chiado district of Lisbon, who would not charge her for her meals. She began to have mental difficulties, on one occasion leaving home and wandering all over Lisbon until the police found her and took her to a care home from where she was collected by relatives. She died in Lisbon on 12 April 1961 at a friend's house where she had been living for over a year. She is buried in Lisbon's Prazeres Cemetery in the zone reserved for artists. A plaque identifying the plot was inserted in 2017, on the 150th anniversary of her birth.
