= Basilica of the Sacred Heart of Jesus, Póvoa de Varzim =

Church in Póvoa de Varzim, Portugal

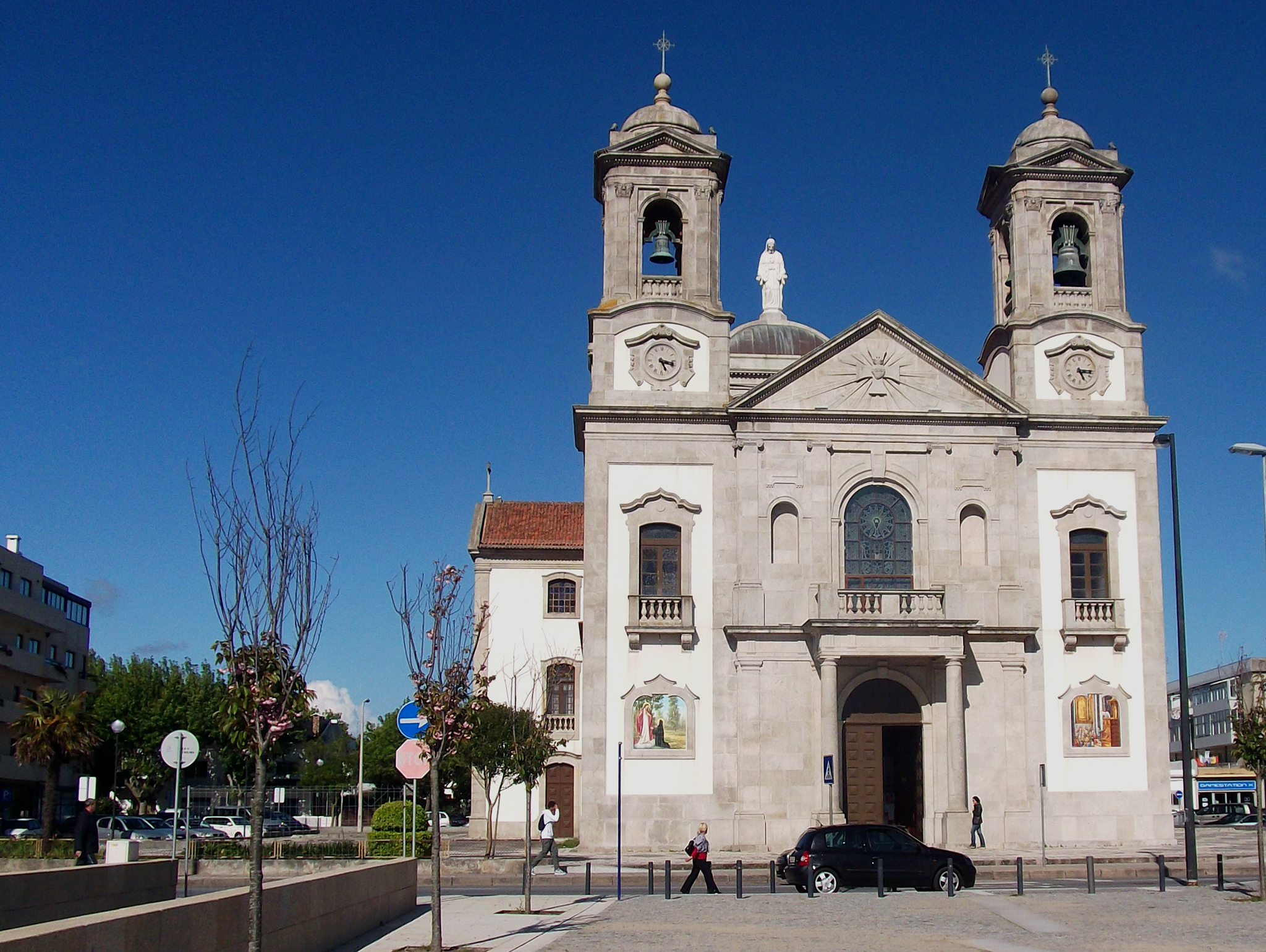
Façade of the Basilica of the Sacred Heart of Jesus in Póvoa de Varzim, Portugal.

The Basilica of the Sacred Heart of Jesus (Portuguese: Basílica do Sagrado Coração de Jesus) is a Roman Catholic church, a Jesuit basilica, in Póvoa de Varzim, Portugal. It is part of the parish of Matriz and it is the largest temple in Póvoa de Varzim.

Construction began in 1890 and by 1900 the original plan by chaplain Priest Ferreira, drawing professor in the Espirito Santo College in Braga, was revealed. However, the details of the basilica's facade, in Neoclassical style, differs from the original plan and, due to its history, has eclectic elements.

The temple is known by its dome, where the icon of the Sacred Heart of Jesus is found, a sculpture of Jesus Christ. The base of this dome is lit by twelve windows in arc that allow entrance of light, giving lightness to the structure and offering the illusion of a celestial aureole.

The basilica has an estimated mean capacity of about 2,000 people. The temple is 30.10 meters in height, topped by a 4.5-meter-high (15 ft) statue.

== History ==
=== 16th-18th century: The Jesuit stronghold ===
Since the second half of the 16th century, the Jesuits were present in Póvoa de Varzim. In early 18th century, the company established the Irmandade do S.S. Coração de Jesus (brotherhood of the Sacred Heart of Jesus) in Póvoa fortress, which summed up with over 2,000 brothers, in certain periods, including people from Póvoa and neighboring lands. The brotherhood was extinct by King Joseph, during the expulsion of the society from Portugal in 1761.

=== 19th century: The new Jesuit mission and construction ===
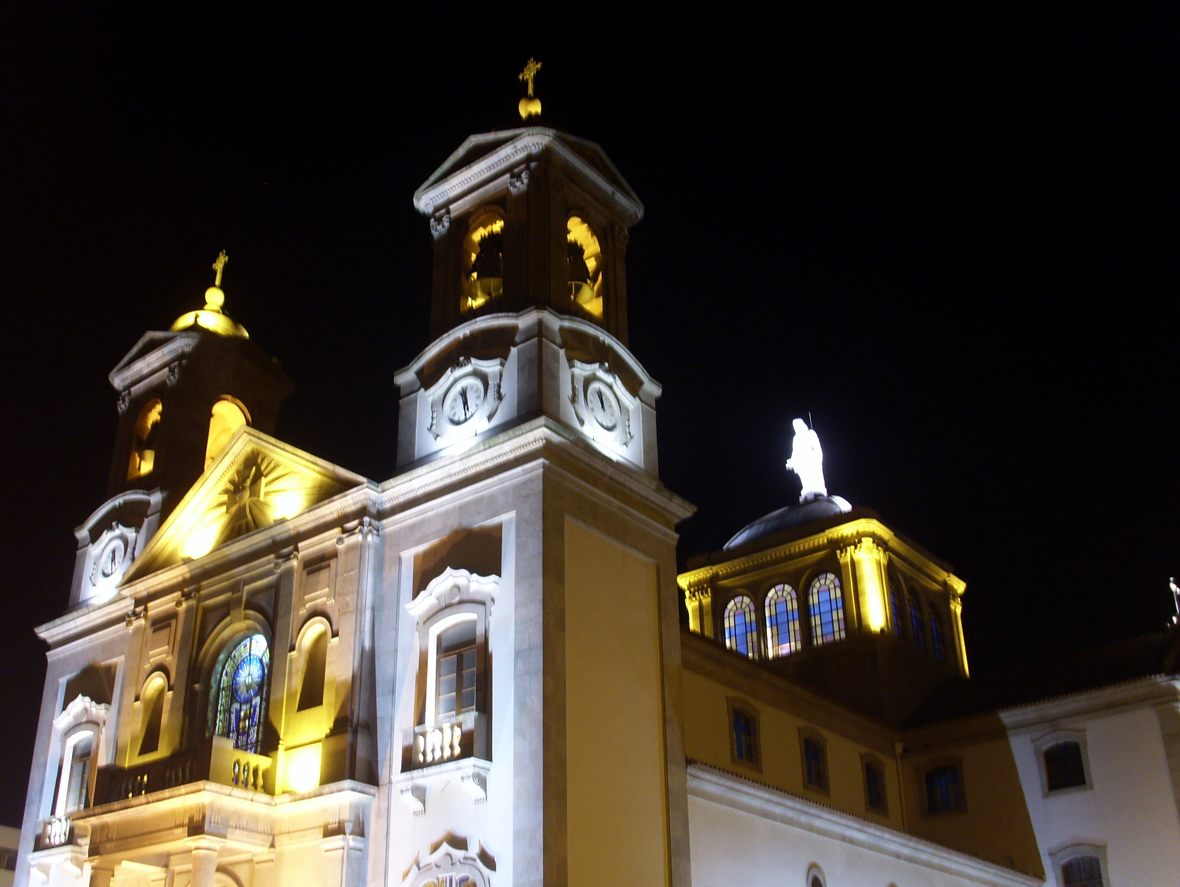
Sacred Heart of Jesus icon, over the dome, illuminated at night.

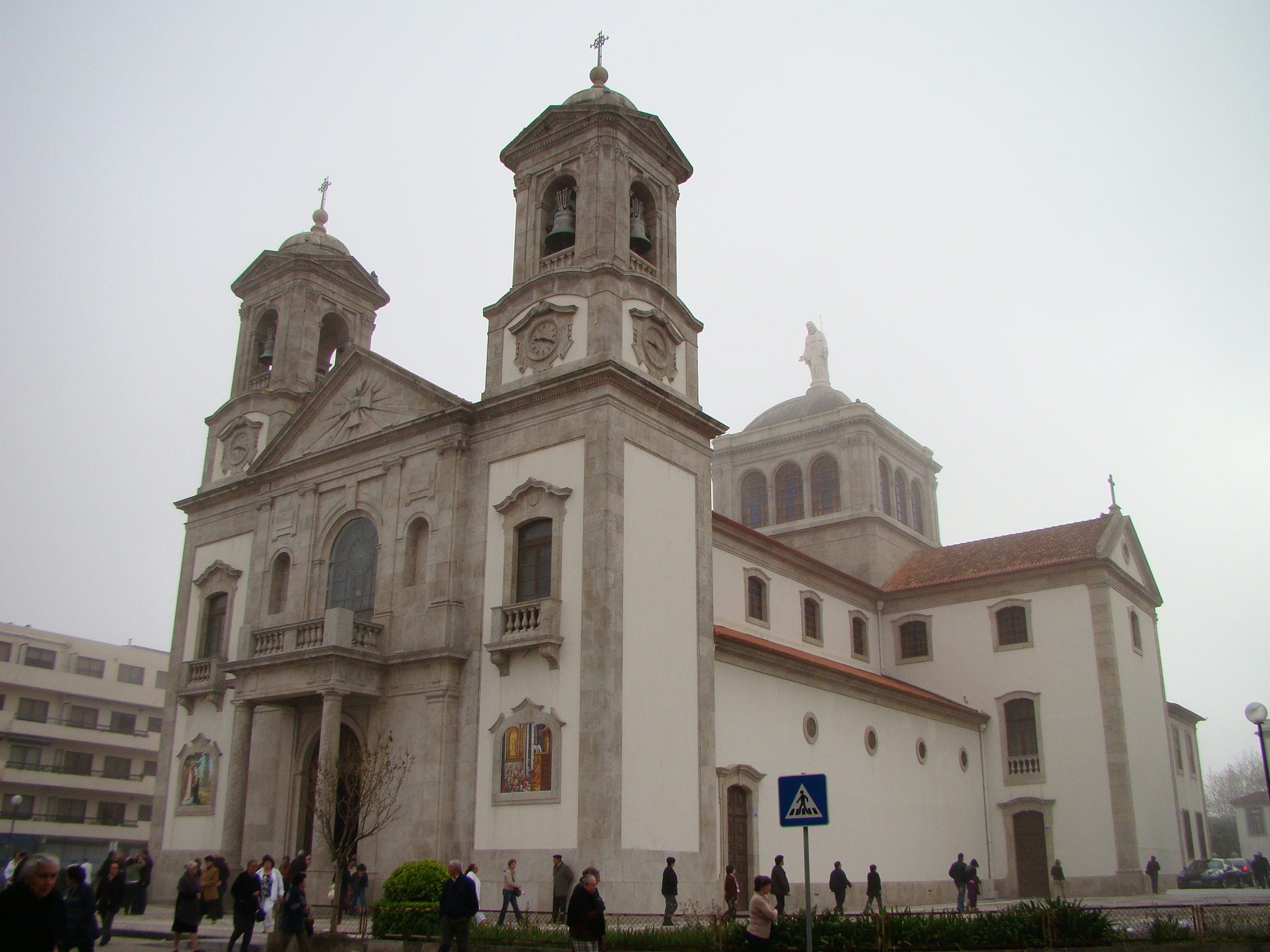
The Basilica is the largest church in Póvoa de Varzim.

In the 19th century, the Jesuits returned and throw their missions, the "Apostolado de Oração" (Praying Apostolate) mission in 1883 and the increase of devotions, the society acquired once again a considerable influence in the Povoan society of the time. João Francisco Trocado, secretary of Apostolado de Oração League, acquired an icon of the Heart of Jesus blessed by cardinal D. Américo in 1888 in Porto and by that the idea to build a worthy temple, a basilica, for the sculpture, appeared. The imposing new church aimed to be for Northern Portugal, the same as Basílica da Estrela was for Lisbon.

The church was built in the old town of Póvoa de Varzim on August 31, 1890. While the new temple was being built, a temporary wood building blessed on July 10, 1892 named Capela-Escola do Sagrado Coração de Jesus (Chapel-School of the Sacred Heart of Jesus) was raised to harbor the statue and to function as a Sunday school and home for the Jesuits. By 1894, the walls of the chancel were raised and the chancel was complete in 1899.

=== Early 20th century: Anti-Jesuit campaign and the completion ===
Povoan elite, most notably Rocha Peixoto, António dos Santos Graça and others freemasons and republicans encouraged demonstrations against the Jesuits, specifically the 1901 demonstration, by believing the Jesuits were responsible for the ignorance and beliefs of the uninformed people. Laborers and craftsmen, with republican ideas, were responsible for most riots. For them the influence of the Jesuits and the Dorotean sisters, who governed the feminine Sagrado Coração de Jesus College, harmed socialist and republican ideology. The town hall administrator, Domingos José Moreira in a telegram from March, 11th 1901 says that "Yesterday night a numerous group of people went throw the streets with an uncivil attitude, justifying it as an anti-Jesuit protest. I requested support from the fiscal guard that could restore order and public tranquility.

The anti-Jesuit campaign was fierce after the implementation of the Republic. The construction stopped in 1910 with the expulsion of the Jesuits, in the year of the proclamation of the Portuguese Republic. Most of the population, including the wealthy conservative families, and the traditionalist and also conservative fishermen supported the clergy, even after the April 20th 1911 Law that separated the State and the Church and caused the nationalization of the Church's wealth.

The temple was left in ruins and was delivered to the Nossa Senhora de Lourdes Brotherhood, and then to S. José Brotherhood. For 17 years, the basilica was planned to be a primary school. After the May 28th 1926 Revolution, the construction of the basilica resumed in 1927 with the return of the Jesuits, and concluded on October 31, 1948 during the Estado Novo regime. However, works continued in two altars and the positioning of the 24 bells of the towers. The subscribers who had offered over a thousand escudos had their names recorded in marble in the walls.

Nowadays, the Basilica shelters a small Jesuit community, one of the five in the Archdiocese of Braga.

== Architecture ==
The Basilica forms a Latin cross with three naves. Despite being a late construction, it retains the mannerist scheme typical of Jesuit art. However, the façade differs substantially and has a neoclassical style with Baroque-inspired cornices, and the towers recall Romanesque solutions.

== See also ==
- Sacred Heart of Jesus
- Póvoa de Varzim
