= António de Sousa Bastos =

Portuguese playwright, theatre impresario, author and journalist

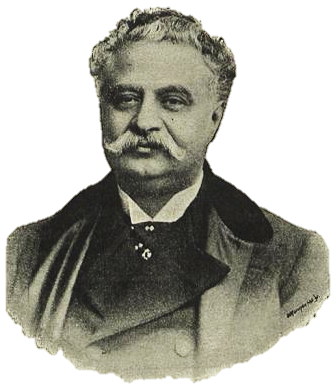
- Born: António Rodrigo Francisco João Valeriano Bernardino Peregrino Ângelo André Carlos Nicolau Vicente José Augusto Máximo Magalhães de Sousa Bastos de Judicibus; 13 May 1844; Lisbon, Portugal
- Died: 2 July 1911 Aged 67; Lisbon, Portugal
- Resting place: Alto de São João Cemetery, Lisbon
- Occupations: Theatrical director, impresario, playwright, journalist, theatrical historian
- Known for: Portuguese theatre
- Spouse(s): 1. Leopoldina Rosa Vieira Martins; 2. Palmira Bastos
- Children: Five daughters

António de Sousa Bastos (1844 –1911) was a Portuguese writer, playwright, theatre entrepreneur and journalist. Author of the Diccionario do theatro portuguez (Dictionary of Portuguese Theatre), he was the husband of the actress Palmira Bastos.

== Early life ==
António Rodrigo Francisco João Valeriano Bernardino Peregrino Ângelo André Carlos Nicolau Vicente José Augusto Máximo Magalhães de Sousa Bastos de Judicibus was born in Santa Isabel in the Portuguese capital of Lisbon, on 13 May 1844, son of an Italian father, D. Francisco de Judicibus, a landowner from Naples, and of D. Joana Maria da Salvação de Sousa Bastos, from Lisbon. His father was seriously ill at the time of their wedding in January 1841, being expected to die, but recovered and lived a long life. Sousa Bastos went to primary school in Lisbon and secondary school in Santarém. He then returned to Lisbon to follow a course in agronomy but never completed it, preferring to become a journalist.

== Career ==
As a journalist, Sousa Bastos began to work on Álbum Literário, moving on to Comércio de Lisboa, Diário Comercial, Gazeta Setubalense, Gazeta do Dia, and other papers. His writings on the theatre appeared in O Palco, O Espectador Imparcial, A Arte Dramática and Ribaltas e Gambiarras. He was appointed as director of several theatres and manager of several dramatic companies in Lisbon and in Brazil and was considered a pioneer in the development of theatrical management techniques. In 1878, already a leading figure in the Portuguese theatrical scene, he formed a company to perform in the Teatro do Príncipe Real (later the Teatro Apolo) in Lisbon. Averse to hiring stars, he encouraged younger performers and turned them into stars. He gave a first performance in Lisbon to the actress, Tomásia Veloso. In 1890, while managing the Teatro da Rua dos Condes in Lisbon, he gave a first role to Palmira Bastos. In 1894 António Serrão Franco, who had purchased Lisbon's Teatro da Trindade, contracted an artistic society to run shows, and they appointed Sousa Bastos as director. Under him, the resident troupe included performers such as Palmira Bastos and Mercedes Blasco and he would marry the former, 30 years his junior, in 1894. This led Blasco, her professional rival, to leave the Trindade and move to Porto.

== Writing ==
Sousa Bastos wrote dramas, comedies, operettas and also variety shows (known as magazine shows in Portugal). His last variety show was performed in 1909 at the Teatro Avenida in Lisbon, with performers including Pepa Martins de Abreu.

Sousa Bastos was the author of a detailed work, Diccionario do theatro portuguez (1908) in which actors and actresses, theatrical terms and 213 different theatres were described, as well as of Carteira do Artista (1898). These continue to be used as an important source for historians of the Portuguese theatre.

== Personal life ==
Sousa Bastos married Leopoldina Rosa Vieira Martins on 24 August 1865. She died in 1879. They had three daughters. On 1 July 1894, he married Palmira Bastos, with whom he had two daughters, Alda (Joana) de Sousa Bastos and Amélia de Sousa Bastos.

== Death ==
Sousa Bastos died on 2 July 1911, in Lisbon, at the age of 67, a victim of Bright's Disease and diabetes. He is buried in a private vault in the Alto de São João Cemetery in the same city. Streets have been named in his honour in Lisbon, São Paulo, and near Brasilia.
