= São Domingos Mine =

Cultural heritage monument in Mértola, Portugal

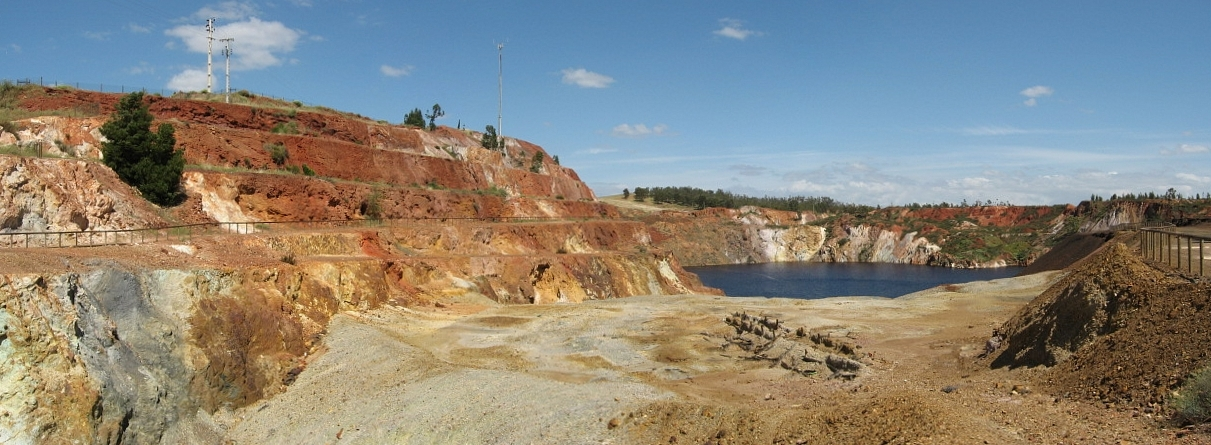
- São Domingos Mine

- Location in Portugal
- Location: Alentejo, Portugal; 37°40′08″N 007°29′38″W
- Products: Pyrite, Copper, Gold and silver
- Opened: 1854
- Closed: 1966

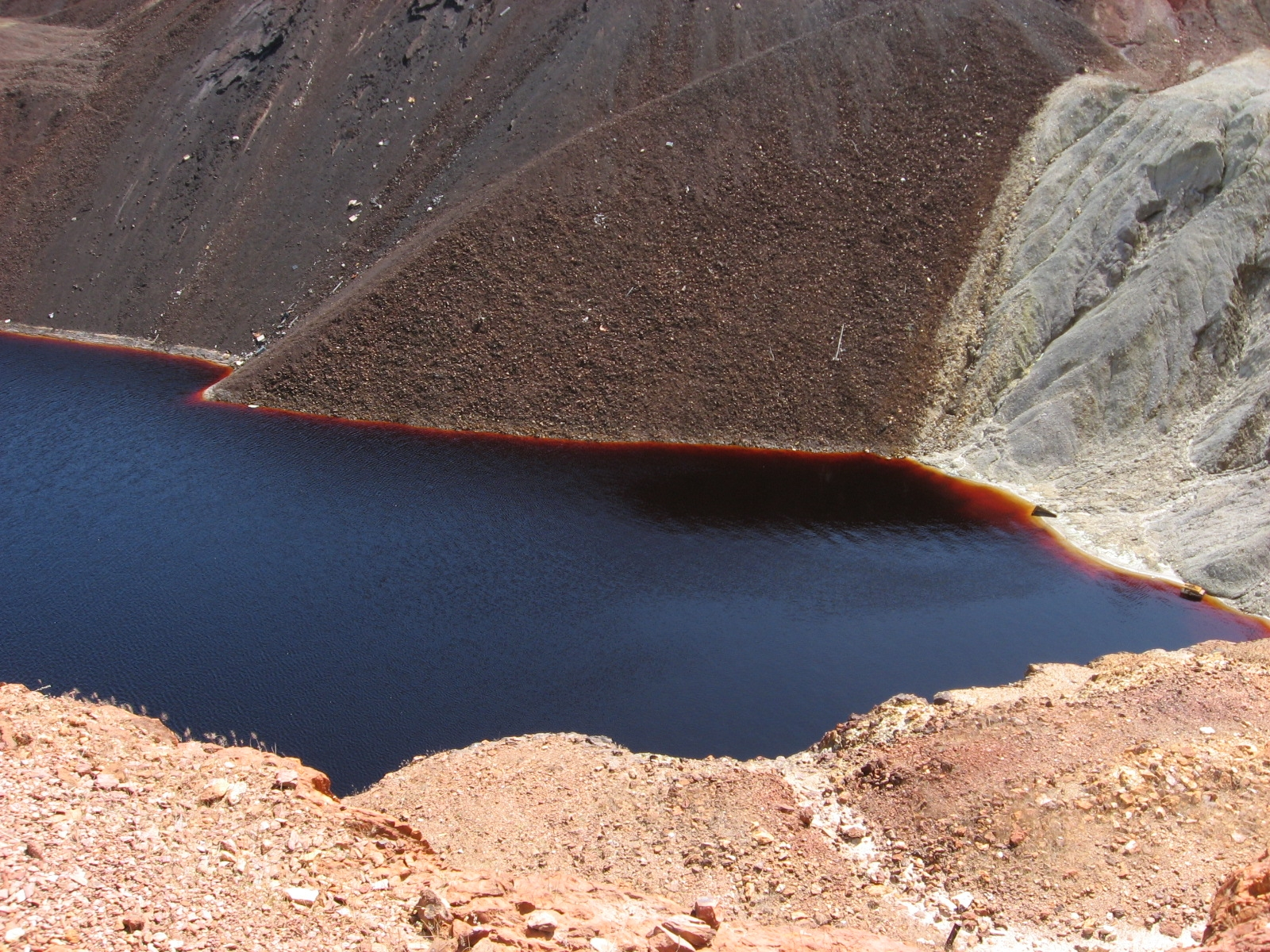
Water in the pit is red due to iron and is acidic from sulfur oxidation.

The São Domingos Mine is a deserted open-pit mine in Corte do Pinto, Mértola municipality, Alentejo region, Portugal. This site is one of the volcanogenic massive sulfide ore deposits in the Iberian Pyrite Belt, which extends from the southern Portugal into Spain. It was the first place in Portugal to have electric lighting.

== History ==
The Romans mined in the São Domingos area for gold and silver for about 400 years. Mining stopped here when the Romans left.

In 1854 Nicolau Biava, an Italian miner from Piedmont, Italy, staked a claim to the mine; ownership then passed to a French syndicate. In 1855 mining was resumed, as the international demand for copper grew during the Industrial Revolution. In 1859 the mining concession was leased for 50 years to an English mining company, Mason and Barry, run by Sir Francis Barry, 1st Baronet and his brother-in-law James Mason, because of their industrial mining expertise. The nearby port of Pomarão was inaugurated the same year.

Known as Pomaron in England, this inland port was specially constructed on the River Guadiana, which here forms the border with Spain, to serve the mine. In 1862 an 11-mile (18 km) railway, of three foot-six inch gauge, was opened connecting the mine to Pomarão. From Pomarão ore was exported, mostly to England, by ship. Pomarão was destroyed in a disastrous flood on 6–8 December 1876, and subsequently rebuilt.

1874 map of São Domingos Mine

Mason and Barry switched from tunnel mining to open-pit mining in 1867. Copper ore was initially the main product of the mine; but at the end of World War I, sulphuric acid became much more important, so pyrite was mined as a source of sulfur, and this proved to eventually be the downfall of the entire region. Because of the large quantities of water required for the smelting and purification of the sulfur, the water was turned into a sulfuric acid solution, which then leached into the ground, contaminating a large area around the mine.

As well as this, many of the miners were experiencing the effects of acidosis from breathing the sulfur dioxide fumes in the air, which also settled on any exposed surfaces and caused them to become acidic with the application of moisture of any sort, like dew, rain, or just humidity in the air. This added another level of misery to the miners, as anything they touched had the potential of causing chemical burns.

About 25 megatons of ore had been extracted when the mine was closed in 1966 due to the Portuguese government threatening to bring in legislation making companies, especially mining companies, financially responsible for cleaning up their mistakes. This added another level of devastation in the region, as there was now an excess of people out of work due to the mine closure.

== Climate ==
The area around the mine has a Mediterranean climate with very hot, dry summers and mild, wet winters. The station used in the site is no longer active.

Climate data for São Domingos Mine, 17 year period (between 1941 and 1991), 168 m (551 ft)
Month	Jan	Feb	Mar	Apr	May	Jun	Jul	Aug	Sep	Oct	Nov	Dec	Year
Mean daily maximum °C (°F)	15.1 (59.2)	16.3 (61.3)	19.0 (66.2)	21.5 (70.7)	25.2 (77.4)	30.0 (86.0)	33.7 (92.7)	33.8 (92.8)	30.6 (87.1)	24.1 (75.4)	18.8 (65.8)	15.7 (60.3)	23.7 (74.6)
Daily mean °C (°F)	10.4 (50.7)	11.4 (52.5)	13.6 (56.5)	15.7 (60.3)	18.7 (65.7)	22.6 (72.7)	25.7 (78.3)	25.6 (78.1)	23.5 (74.3)	18.6 (65.5)	14.0 (57.2)	11.1 (52.0)	17.6 (63.7)
Mean daily minimum °C (°F)	5.6 (42.1)	6.4 (43.5)	8.1 (46.6)	9.9 (49.8)	12.1 (53.8)	15.1 (59.2)	17.6 (63.7)	17.4 (63.3)	16.4 (61.5)	13.0 (55.4)	9.1 (48.4)	6.4 (43.5)	11.4 (52.6)
Average precipitation mm (inches)	70.4 (2.77)	58.3 (2.30)	62.5 (2.46)	50.3 (1.98)	32.2 (1.27)	17.2 (0.68)	2.3 (0.09)	3.0 (0.12)	20.8 (0.82)	63.5 (2.50)	74.9 (2.95)	79.2 (3.12)	534.6 (21.06)
Source: IPMA

== Tourism ==
Since closure the mine has attracted tourists. Many old mine buildings and the open-cast pit remain. The old mining company headquarters has been converted into a hotel. A small museum and archive, the casa do mineiro, in an old miner's cottage, depicts the life of the Portuguese miner. There is also an exhibition in an old cinema.

There is an English cemetery, where mine managers and their families, many from Cornwall, are buried. The railway line has been removed but one can still see the trackbed for much of the route.

== People from Sao Domingos Mine ==
- Mercedes Blasco, Actress
