= Cemetery of Prado do Repouso =

Cemetery in Porto, Portugal

- Cemitério do Prado do Repouso
- Interactive map of Cemetery of Prado do Repouso

Details
- Established: 18th century
- Location: Cedofeita, Santo Ildefonso, Sé, Miragaia, São Nicolau e Vitória
- Country: Portugal
- Coordinates: 41°08′30″N 8°35′43.8″W
- Style: Neoclassical, Neo-Gothic
- Owned by: Portuguese Republic
- Size: 10 square kilometres (3.9 sq mi)
- Website: Official Site

The Cemetery of Prado do Repouso (Portuguese: Cemitério do Prado do Repouso) is a cemetery in the civil parish of Bonfim, in the northern Portuguese municipality of Porto.

== History ==
The lands, today occupied by the cemetery, were part of the bishop's Quinta do Prado in the 16th century. The lands were part of an estate over the river, transformed by D. Frei Marcos of Lisboa, against the interests of the Portuense prelates, in order to shelter sick clerics or those that required respite from their works. Unfortunately, the site was never used for this purpose. The site had a small chapel dedicated to São Tomás, likely associated with bishop D. Tomás de Almeida, in addition to two mills alongside the meadow.

In 1804, D. António de S. José e Castro, founded on the Quinta do Prado the Diocesanal Seminary of Porto. At this time, construction on the church to the invocation of São Victor (today the actually cemetery chapel).

Between 1832 and 1834, during the Liberal Wars, under the initiative of prelate D. João de Magalhães e Avelar, the site was abandoned and the buildings were burned-down during the encirclement of Porto. In 1835, the regency began regulating and prohibiting burials inside churches and private cemeteries, with burials being regulated by the State. On 3 April 1839, bishop D. Manuel de Santa Inês complained that he was not being able to dispose the property. It was selected as a cemetery location during this era, owing to its position outside the urban area, it was already walled-in and landscaped for the purpose, in addition to annexes and ancillary buildings existed around it. The municipal council authorized public works to adapt part of the meadow, cemetery and unfinished seminary lands. The uncompleted church of São Victor, were incorporated into the lands destined for the cemetery and was renamed as the Capela do Cemitério do Prado do Repouso (Chapel of the Cemetery of Prado do Repouso). The alterations were blessed and the first stone placed by D. Frei Manuel de Santa Inês. In December, the site was inaugurated with the burial of the mortal remains of Francisco de Almada Mendonça (provedor between 1794 and 1804 of the private chapel of the Misericórdia of Porto.

On 10 December 1896, a petition to construct a western chapel, to be consigned for the Christian Order of Carmel.

In 1922, António Maria Leite, made a request to construct the first chapel-tomb for his family.

In 1989, the cemetery celebrated its 150 years of service.

The chapel's interior was restored in 1998, that involved treatment, conservation and restoration of supports and stucco ornamental structures; the mural painting in the chancel and nave; the repairs to cornerstones; the gilding of woods and decorative polychromatic stuccoes; repair to stone pavement and of cast-iron elements and artistic joinery. This also included the consolidation of traditional mortars and paint. Additional repairs were undertaken in 2018, that included works of conservation and restoration in exterior and interior.

== Architecture ==
The cemetery is located in an isolated urban area, implanted on a plain, delimited in the east by industrial buildings, to the north and west by residential buildings and south by a building of the Colégio dos Órfãos (orphan college).
