= Teatro Baquet =

Former theatre in Porto, Portugal

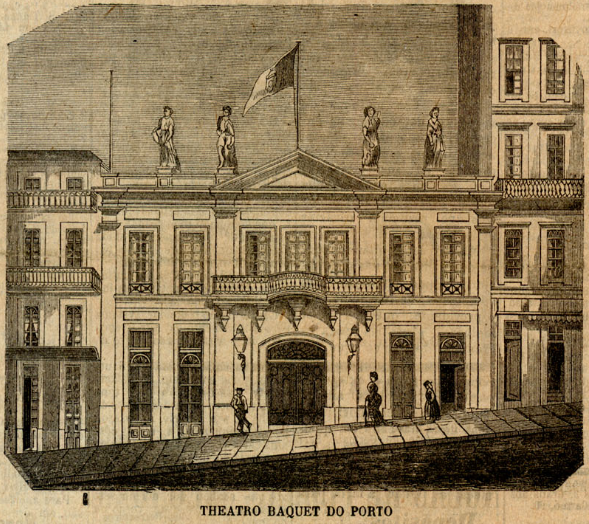
- Interactive map of Teatro Baquet
- Address: Porto; Portugal
- Coordinates: 41°08′47″N 08°36′33″W
- Owner: Defunct

Construction
- Opened: 16 July 1859
- Closed: 22 March 1888

The Teatro Baquet was a theatre located in what is today Rua 31 de Janeiro in the city of Porto, Portugal. It opened in 1859 and was destroyed by fire in 1888, with the loss of 120 lives.

== Origins ==
The Teatro Baquet was built by António Pereira. Work began on 21 February 1858, and the theatre was first used for a masked Carnival ball on 13 February 1859. Born in Porto, António Pereira emigrated to Spain with his family in 1828, where he learned to be a tailor. In 1836 he married Ignácia Lopez de la Rica. The couple had no children. On his return to Porto, Pereira rapidly established himself as a sought-after tailor. He started using the name "Baquet", possibly because he thought a foreign name would assist him to market his business, and established Casa Baquet, which sold the first ready-to-wear clothing in Porto. Historians are generally agreed that the origin of the "Baquet" name was a visit to Paris in which he was given it as a nickname. The word means “tub” in English. His business prospered and available evidence suggests that Baquet was able to fund the new theatre as the sole investor.

The theatre was built in the same street as the Teatro Circo, which became the Teatro do Príncipe Real and is now the Teatro Sá da Bandeira, the oldest theatre in Porto. Some construction difficulties were experienced because the street was much higher than the plot of land owned by Baquet, with the result that the theatre was higher at the back than the front. As a consequence, spectators seated in the stalls had to walk down two ramps to get to their places.

== Design ==
The façade was designed by Guilherme Correia and was covered entirely in granite from the Porto area. It had a neoclassical design that was similar to several other buildings in the city. The ground floor consisted mainly of doors, while the first floor had a wrought-iron balcony. At the top of the building there were four marble statues representing drama, music, painting and art. The original plan was to have 82 boxes on three floors but width limitations meant that the number had to be reduced to 68. Seating in the stalls was 236, while there was a balcony with a capacity of 178 and a gallery for 200. The second floor was ornamented with the names of leading international writers and composers, as well as the Portuguese poet Luís de Camões, the playwright Gil Vicente, and the poet, playwright and novelist Almeida Garrett. The quality of the seating was said to have "fallen short of expectations" and the acoustics in the upper part of the theatre were also commented on negatively but, in general, the theatre was well received by the media.

== Performances ==
After the initial opening for Carnival, the theatre remained closed until 16 July 1859, while interior decorations were being completed. After the official opening and first performance on July 16, the theatre had to immediately close for eight days because of the death of Queen Stephanie on the following day. This was considered to have represented bad luck for the theatre. For the inaugural show, Baquet hired the company of the Teatro do Ginásio in Lisbon and that company put on several different shows during the theatre's first months. However, after this opening the Baquet witnessed a long period of instability. Lacking its own theatre company, it offered space to travelling companies, resulting in unreliable performances and a failure to become associated with a specific genre. However, it did attract some of the most famous Portuguese performers of the time, such as Emília das Neves, Lucinda Simões, João Anastácio Rosa and Augusto Rosa.

In 1870, the Moutinho company leased the theatre from Baquet's widow, Baquet having died in 1869. After her death in 1875, the theatre passed to her second husband, António Teixeira d'Assis, who had been a partner of Baquet and had a bronze bust of Baquet placed on the facade. On his death, it was inherited by his mother and under her ownership a number of changes were made to the interior, including the introduction of an emergency exit at the rear of the theatre. However, successive companies failed to achieve financial success at the theatre, which was finding it difficult to compete with the Teatro do Príncipe Real next door, which offered regular operettas.

== The fire ==
On the night of 20 March 1888, the theatre was completely destroyed by a fire that broke out behind the stage. It was almost full for a benefit show for the actor Firmino Rosa, which included the performance of a comic opera. Following demands for an encore the scenery had to be reset and it was while this was being done that one of the backdrops caught fire. The fire spread rapidly, there was intense smoke and general panic, and people could not see where to go to escape because the gas lighting had been turned off and because there was no direct route to the exit at the rear, meaning they could not be guided by lights from outside. About 120 people died and the fire consumed the entire theatre in a few hours. There were significant delays to the arrival of the firefighters.

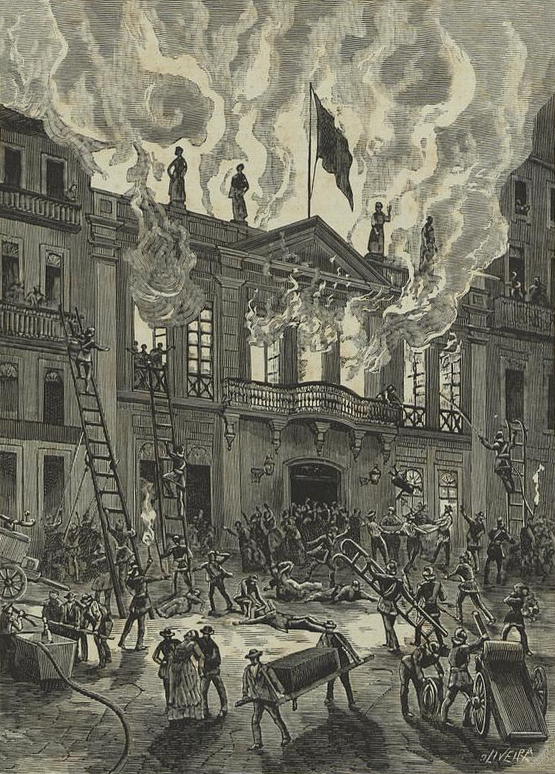
Drawing of the fire that appeared in O Occidente on 1 April 1888

== Aftermath ==
The tragedy affected the entire country. Queen Maria Pia immediately went to Porto to visit the victims' relatives and attend the various funeral and fundraising ceremonies, including one at Porto's Cristal Palace where artists from all over Portugal performed. The popular poet, Guerra Junqueiro, wrote a poem, called "A Tear", which was sold to raise funds. A monument to the victims was established in Porto's Agramonte Cemetery, built from materials collected from the rubble of the theatre. The fire led to the government creating new safety regulations for theatres and concert halls, although there have been several fires in Portuguese theatres since that time.

Currently the location of Teatro Baquet is occupied by the Hotel Teatro, which has won awards for a design that follows a theatrical theme
