= António Augusto de Rocha Peixoto =

- Born: 18 May 1866; Póvoa de Varzim, Portugal
- Died: 2 May 1909 (aged 42); Matosinhos, Portugal
- Occupations: Naturalist, ethnologist and archaeologist

António Augusto de Rocha Peixoto (18 May 1866–2 May 1909) was a Portuguese naturalist, ethnologist and archaeologist.

In 1891, he became the secretariat of the magazine Revista de Portugal established by his friend Eça de Queiroz and organized the Cabinet of Mineralogy, Geology and Palaeontology of the Polytechnic Academy of Porto (currently University of Porto). He also collaborated in other journals and magazines and was the director of the Public Library and Municipal Museum of Porto. In his native town, he revealed Cividade de Terroso and remodelled the town hall. Two weeks after dying, his body was transferred from the cemetery of Agramonte in Porto to the one of Póvoa.
