= Teatro da Trindade =

Theatre in Lisbon, Portugal

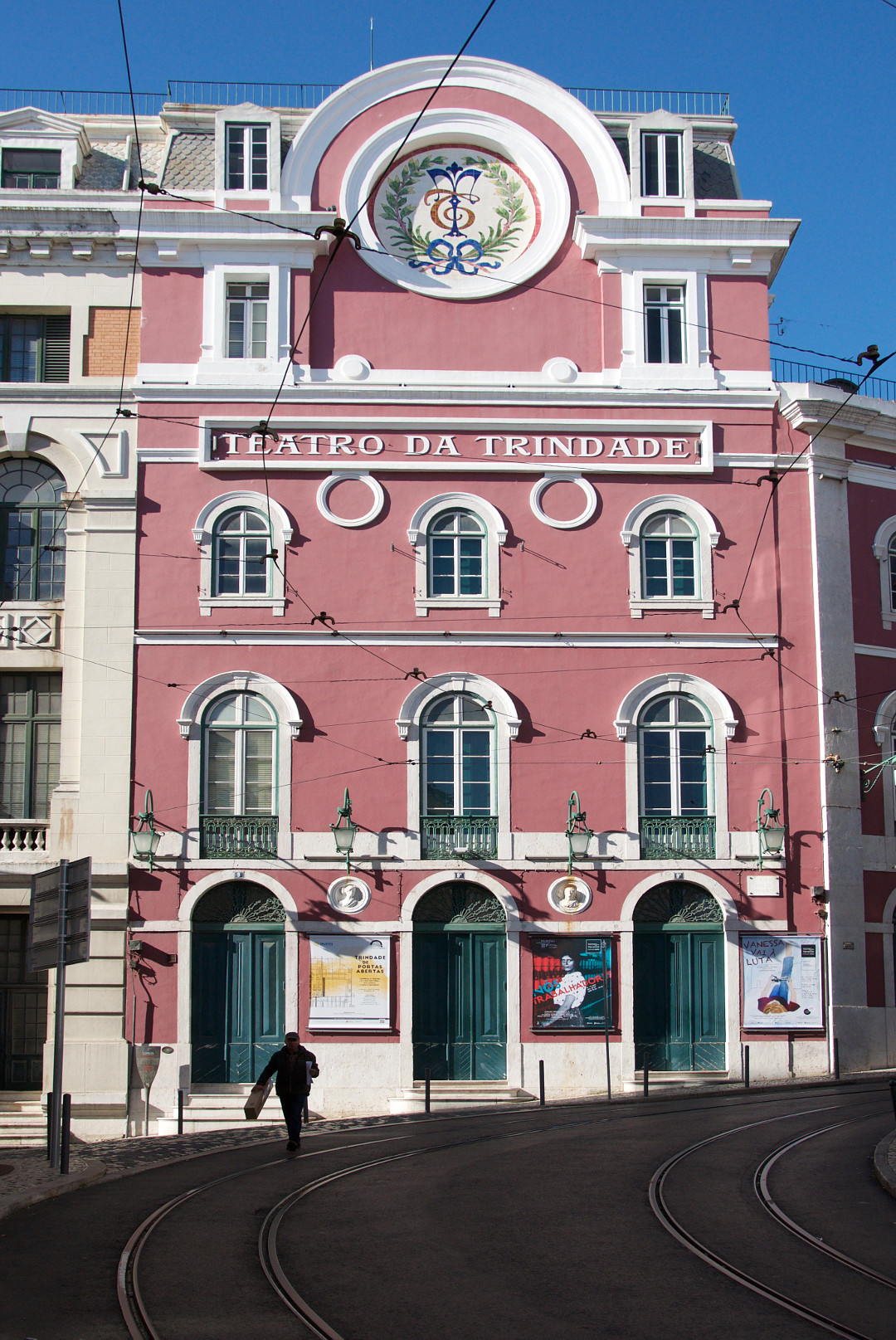
- Interactive map of Teatro da Trindade
- Address: Largo da Trindade; Lisbon; Portugal
- Coordinates: 38°42′42″N 09°08′33″W
- Owner: INATEL

Construction
- Opened: 30 November 1867
- Architect: Miguel Evaristo de Lima Pinto

The Teatro da Trindade is a theatre in the Chiado neighbourhood of Lisbon, Portugal, built in the 19th century. It is one of the oldest theatres in Lisbon still in operation.

== Construction and opening ==
In 1866, Francisco Pereira Palha de Faria de Lacerda, a writer and playwright, decided to build his own theatre, forming a joint-stock company of friends and investors, including the Duke of Palmela. The location of the Trindade area of the Chiado was chosen because of historical associations, as there had briefly been a theatre in the area in the 18th century when the Italian businessman, Alessandro Paghetti, had created the Academia da Trindade as Lisbon's first popular opera theatre. Three other theatres were already in the Chiado when the Teatro da Trindade was built, the Teatro Nacional de São Carlos, the D. Maria II National Theatre, and the Teatro do Ginásio.

Miguel Evaristo de Lima Pinto was chosen as the architect and the building he designed followed the Portuguese Pombaline style together with some influence of the Italian neoclassical style then in vogue. It was considered the most comfortable, elegant and technically advanced theatre in Lisbon of its time. There were originally two components, a theatre and a hall. The hall was demolished in 1921. The theatre has three facades. The main one faces the Largo da Trindade and is where the royal entrance was. It is decorated with medallions with the busts of the writers António Ferreira (1528–1569), Damião de Góis (1502–1574), and Francisco de Sá de Miranda (1481–1558), as well as a bust of Terpsichore the muse of dance.

The hall (Salão do Trindade) was opened in February 1867 for the Carnival and, on 30 November, the Teatro da Trindade opened, featuring Delphina, Emília Adelaide and Emília Letroublon. Its auditorium has a horseshoe shape. The seating in the stalls, consisting of mahogany chairs, was removable and the floor could be raised to the level of the stage, thus creating a ballroom. An innovation much appreciated by audiences was that chairs had a hook on the back so that the men could hang their hats. Trompe-l'œil paintings on the ceiling, by José Procópio, show Portuguese theatrical personalities such as Gil Vicente, António José da Silva, Almeida Garrett, Luís de Camões, and Manuel Maria Barbosa du Bocage. At the Trindade, Francisco Palha introduced what he called "burlesque opera", with Delphina and Amélia Barros being among the leading performers.

== Turn of the century ==
After the death of Francisco Palha, in January 1890, the management of the Trindade passed through several hands before it was sold to António Serrão Franco, who contracted an artistic society that appointed António de Sousa Bastos as director in 1894. Under Sousa Bastos, the resident company included performers such as Mercedes Blasco and Palmira Bastos. In 1901, management was taken over by Afonso Taveira, who was responsible for guiding the Trindade through the period of instability that included the regicide, the First Portuguese Republic and the beginning of World War I, until his death in 1916.

== Sale and remodelling ==
On January 22, 1921, the Teatro da Trindade was sold to the Anglo-Portuguese Telephone Company, which wanted to install its offices there. The Salão da Trindade was then totally demolished. A few months later an auction was held to sell all of the property of the theatre, including, furniture and props. The idea that the Teatro da Trindade would close caused indignation amongst the theatre-going public. Knowing that the telephone company did not need the theatre space, José Loureiro offered to buy the theatre, which was sold to him for ten thousand pounds sterling in 1923. Remodelling was then carried out. The size of the stage enabled the Trindade to put on variety performances that required a large cast. Theatrical groups to play there included the Amélia Rey Colaço-Robles Monteiro company, the Portuguese Opera Company (CPO), the Comedians of Lisbon (Os Comediantes de Lisboa) run by Francisco Carlos Lopes Ribeiro and his brother António and the Teatro Nacional Popular. From 1938 the Trindade was also used for short seasons of cinema.

== 1962 to the present ==
In 1962 FNAT, the National Foundation for Happiness at Work (Fundação Nacional para Alegria no Trabalho), an organization promoted by Portugal's authoritarian Estado Novo government, acquired the Teatro da Trindade. In 1967, remodelling work was carried out, under the direction of Maria José Salavisa, who chose the blue and gold interior decoration that remains today. In 1991, extensive renovation and restoration work was carried out on the entire building. New facilities were created for the administration and the stage, dressing rooms and service areas were refitted. The previous rehearsal room was converted into a studio room, which created a space for the presentation of experimental theatre. In 2009, the facades were restored, the roof was replaced and public areas were refitted. The theatre continues to be owned and operated by the successor organization to FNAT, known as the National Institute for the Use of Workers' Free Time (Instituto Nacional para o Aproveitamento dos Tempos Livres), or INATEL.

== See also ==
- List of theatres and auditoriums in Lisbon
