= Palmira Bastos =

Portuguese stage actor

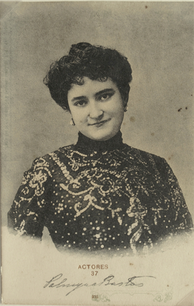
- Autographed photo, c. 1900
- Born: Maria da Conceição Martínez; 30 May 1875; Alenquer, Portugal
- Died: 10 May 1967 (aged 91); Lisbon, Portugal
- Occupation: actor
- Years active: 1890–1967
- Known for: Lisbon theatre
- Spouse: António de Sousa Bastos
- Children: 2

Palmira Bastos (30 May 1875 – 10 May 1967) was one of the best-known Portuguese stage actresses in the first half of the 20th century.

== Early life ==
Maria da Conceição Martínez (Martins) de Sousa Bastos was born on 30 May 1875, in the municipality of Alenquer in the Lisbon District of Portugal. She was the third daughter of a couple of Spanish actors from a travelling company who were temporarily in Portugal. After being abandoned by her husband, her mother and her three daughters went to Lisbon, where the mother worked as a dressmaker by day and as a chorus girl at night.

== Career ==
Palmira Bastos's debut as an actress took place on 18 July 1890 at the Teatro da Rua dos Condes, when she received an ovation for her performance. She continued to perform there for several years, in 1893 having her first starring role and making the first of eleven tours to Brazil. In 1894 she moved to the Teatro da Trindade, which was managed by the dramaturge and impresario, António de Sousa Bastos, who had given her her first role in 1890. She married Sousa Bastos, 30 years her elder, in 1894 and they had two daughters. Between 1900 and 1903 she performed at Teatro Avenida and in April 1904, she made her debut at the D. Maria II National Theatre in Lisbon. In the seasons from 1905 to 1907, as well as in the season of 1909/10, she was part of the cast of the Teatro Dona Amélia. Her dedication to serious or legitimate theatre caused displeasure among the admirers of her performance in lighter works. To their satisfaction Palmira then joined a company performing Viennese operas, at the Teatro da Trindade until 1913. Her husband died in 1911 and in 1917 she married António Maria Monteiro de Sousa de Almeida Cruz, who was both an actor and a tenor. The marriage did not last long.

Palmira Bastos made only one film, the silent movie called O Destino (The Destiny), in 1922, with the French Director George Pallu.

The years that followed involved almost constant collaboration with the Rey Colaço-Robles Monteiro theatre company. It was during this period that Bastos saw her status as first lady of the Portuguese theatre consolidated. From 1931 to 1936 she was a regular at the National Theatre, to which the Rey Colaço-Robles Monteiro company had moved. After several years away from popular theatre, she made a brief (and final) return to the genre in plays at the Teatro Avenida and, in 1937, at the Teatro Variedades. She then returned to the Rey Colaço-Robles Monteiro Company at the National Theatre, which she only left when she retired from the stage in 1966. Most of her most memorable work was during this latter period including in Mourning Becomes Electra by Eugene O'Neill (1943), Lady Windermere's Fan by Oscar Wilde (1944), and Tartuffe by Molière (1966). Her ninetieth birthday was celebrated with a large party at the Teatro Avenida in May 1965. Her final role was at the end of 1966. It was performed at the Teatro São Luiz after the National Theatre was damaged by fire. In the same year she also made her final television performance.

Bastos died on May 10, 1967, in Lisbon, at the age of 91, and was buried in the Alto de São João Cemetery of Lisbon. Two decades later the decorations she was awarded were the subject of a court case between her granddaughter, who wished to donate them to the National Theatre museum, and a friend of Palmira Bastos who argued that he had been given the decorations by one of the daughters of Bastos as a token of their families’ friendship.

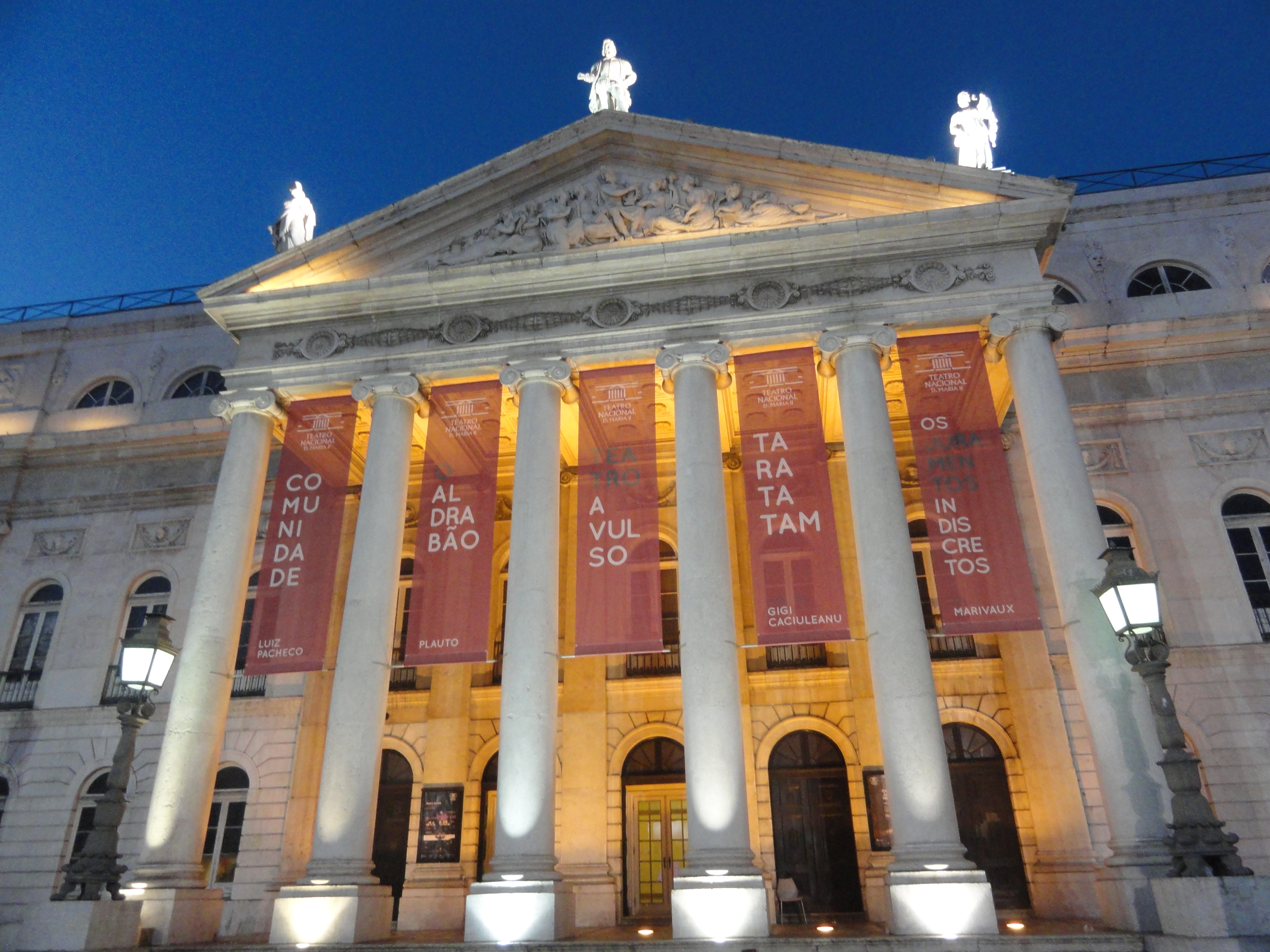
D. Maria II National Theatre in Lisbon

== Tributes and decorations ==
Among the awards received by Bastos were:

- 1920 – Officer of the Military Order of Saint James of the Sword (Portuguese: Ordem Militar de Sant'Iago da Espada)
- 1958 – Commander of the Military Order of Saint James of the Sword
- 1963 – António Pinheiro Award, for the staging of Each In His Own Way by Luigi Pirandello
- 1965 – Commander of the Military Order of Christ
- 1965 – Lucinda Simões Award, for her performance in the play The Sacred Flame by Somerset Maugham
- Silver Medal of the City of Lisbon
- Gold Medal of the City of Lisbon
