= Teatro Avenida =

Defunct theatre in Lisbon, Portugal

- The former Teatro Avenida in Lisbon
- Interactive map of Teatro Avenida
- Address: Avenida da Liberdade 150; Lisbon; Portugal
- Coordinates: 38°43′10.6″N 09°08′39.5″W

Construction
- Opened: 11 February 1888
- Closed: 13 December 1967

Teatro da Avenida, better known as Teatro Avenida, was a theatre located at 150 to 156 Avenida da Liberdade in the city of Lisbon, Portugal, which operated from 1888 to 13 December 1967, when it was completely destroyed by fire.

Following the 1755 Lisbon earthquake, the city was rebuilt under the instructions of Sebastião José de Carvalho e Melo, 1st Marquis of Pombal. The reconstruction included the development of a park, oriented south-east to north-west, known as the Passeio Público. The park's borders rapidly became a popular location for the elite to build their homes and, over time, it was considered necessary for a road to be built through the park. The Avenida da Liberdade was completed in 1886.

The Teatro Avenida opened on 11 February 1888 and until 1906 was the only entertainment facility on the Avenida da Liberdade. It had a very simple appearance, with little architectural distinction. On the ground floor of the façade were four wooden doors, while on the first floor there was an iron balcony across the width of the façade. The initial reception of the interior by Lisbon's newspapers was very positive although, over the years, it became criticised for being small, cramped and lacking in suitable emergency exits. In part, this criticism may have been because an additional 96 seats were added in the 20th century.

Theatre companies occupying the Teatro Avenida often experienced difficulties in making a profit, particularly in its early years. Almost all genres passed through the theatre, but it found it easier to fill the house for operettas, variety shows, farces, comedies, and sentimental dramas. It had its greatest public and commercial successes in the 1920s and 1930s with popular shows, such as those put on by the Satanela-Amarante company and the Maria Matos- Mendonça de Carvalho company, and with plays involving such stars as Palmira Bastos, Alves da Cunha, and Chaby Pinheiro. Other actors to perform there included Beatriz Costa, Eunice Muñoz, João Villaret, Laura Alves and Vasco Santana.

By the 1950s, however, serious consideration was being given to the future of Teatro Avenida. The owner had announced his intention to sell the building and had tried, without success, to evict the tenant. There were several proposals regarding what to do with the site, including one that involved the construction of a larger, modern theatre. In 1964 the Rey Colaço-Robles Monteiro theatre company moved into the theatre following the destruction by fire of the D. Maria II National Theatre, which it was then occupying. It carried out some remodelling as the Avenida had suffered from considerable neglect. Amélia Rey Colaço, the actress and impresario, used much of her own money in this upgrading and the theatre reopened on 6 February 1965 to a favourable reception, with the Diário de Lisboa noting that it was "newly dressed to hide its old age", stating that it had been transformed into a small theatre in the style of Paris.

In less than three years, however, the Avenida was also destroyed by fire, which broke out 30 minutes before a performance of The Birthday Party by Harold Pinter was due to begin on 13 December 1967. The cause of the fire was believed to have been an electrical fault. The theatre was completely destroyed, with the firefighters having been hindered by a lack of water pressure. In September 1970 the Lisbon municipality approved the demolition of the building and it was replaced by an office building.

== See also ==
- List of theatres and auditoriums in Lisbon
