= Teatro Sá da Bandeira =

Theatre and cinema in Porto, Portugal

Coordinates: 41°08′48″N 8°36′31″W

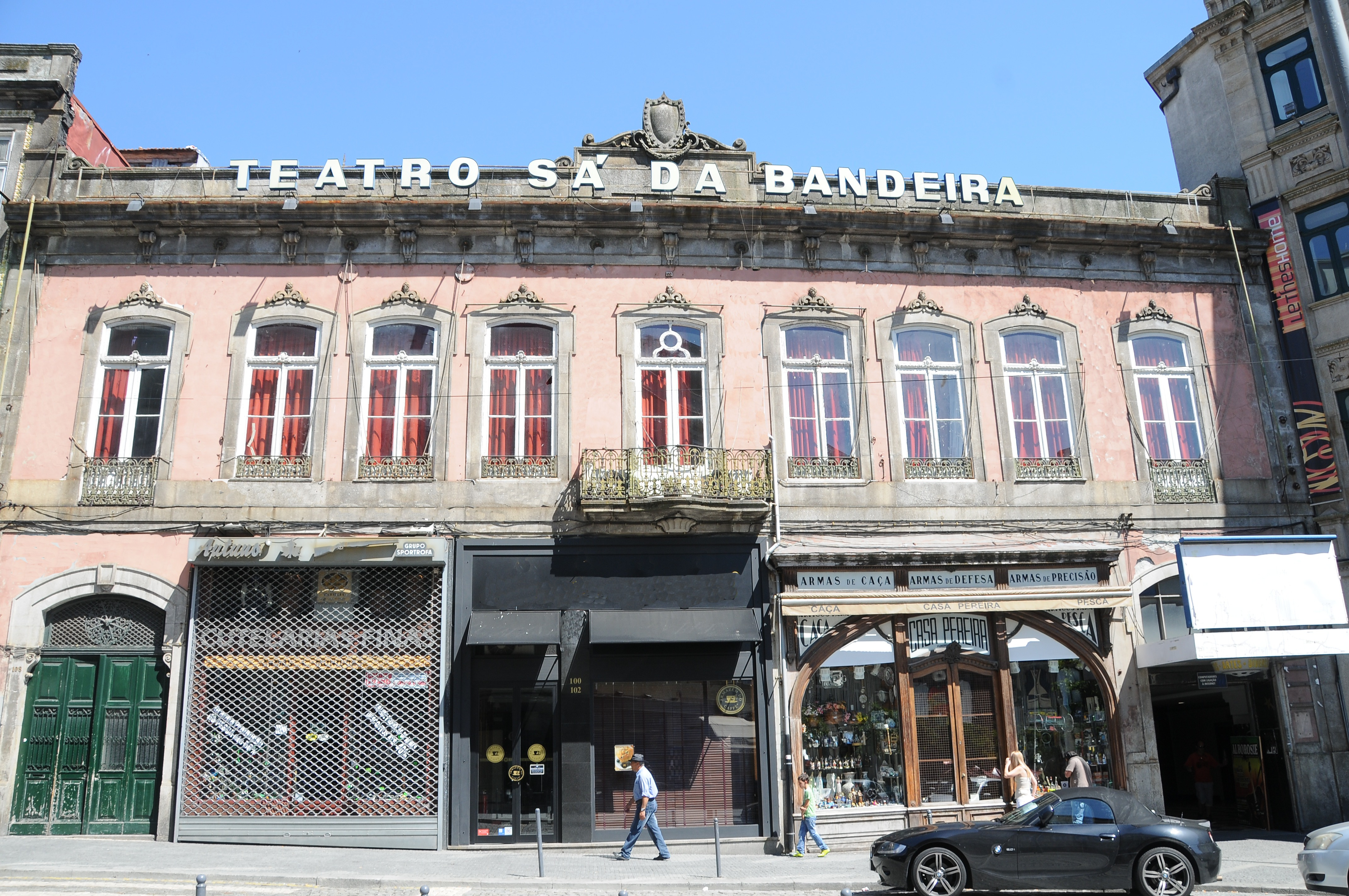
Teatro Sá da Bandeira's façade.

The Teatro Sá da Bandeira is the oldest performance venue in the city of Porto, with a capacity for 786 people and opened in 1846, it was responsible for the first presentation of films produced in Portuguese (on 12 November 1896, by Aurélio Paz dos Reis), and was converted in the first years of its opening on stage to some of the 19th century theater biggest stars, such as Sarah Bernhardt, Julián Gayarre and Antonio Scalvini.

== History ==
On 4 August 1846 it was inaugurated as Teatro Circo, a wooden shack, built by D. José Toudon Ferrer Catalon for his equestrian company.

In 1867 it was demolished to make another one of stone and lime, which in turn was replaced, ten years later, by the building that has survived until today. Until the opening of Rua Sá da Bandeira, at the end of the 1870s, when its façade for that street was built, the theater was only accessible from the then Santo António street, by some stairs that still exist. By that time it had been renamed Teatro-Circo do Príncipe Real.

It was, apart from the São João Theater, considered the best theater in the city of Porto. There, in November 1895, Sarah Bernhardt performed several pieces including "La dame aux camélias" and "Fedora"; there was the first presentation, in Porto, of the Animatógrafo (on 17 July 1896) and also there, on 12 November 1896, that Aurélio da Paz dos Reis presented the first films made by a Portuguese .

In October 1910 (one week after the establishment of the Republic) the name Teatro do Príncipe Real was changed to Teatro Sá da Bandeira.

One of its most notable entrepreneurs was Afonso Taveiro, who would die of apoplexy in the theater audience, when he was directing the general rehearsal of Eduardo Schwalbach's magazine "O dia do Juízo". However, in 1909, its greatest mentor emerged. Arnaldo Moreira da Rocha Brito was a great entrepreneur and a "free-thinker" who was in charge of this theater until his death in 1970, completing 60 years of management. Brito stands out because he was also the first tenant of the Coliseu do Porto, being its manager for 8 years before leaving as he did not agree with the then Salazarist politics. It was one of the first, if not the first theater in Porto, to use electric lighting instead of gas lighting.

In May 1899, when the D. Maria II National Theatre Company of Lisbon appeared there, the advertising posters contained the indication that "In all the shows of this company, the room and the stage are illuminated by electric light, which provides viewers with a pleasant temperature ".

In April 2009 it went on sale for 5.5 million euros. On 23 June 2017 the Porto City Council purchased the theater for 2.1 million euros from the approximately 60 owners, heirs of five families.

The Câmara do Porto launched a classification process with the Directorate-General for Cultural Heritage, also awarding it the distinction as an Entity of Historical and Cultural or Social Local Interest.

In March 2019, the Chamber of Porto decided to sell the theater at public auction for the base bid price of 2.190 million euros, considering that "the utility of maintaining the building in question" was exhausted".

It was purchased by Livraria Lello bookshop on 30 May 2019 for 3.5 million euros.

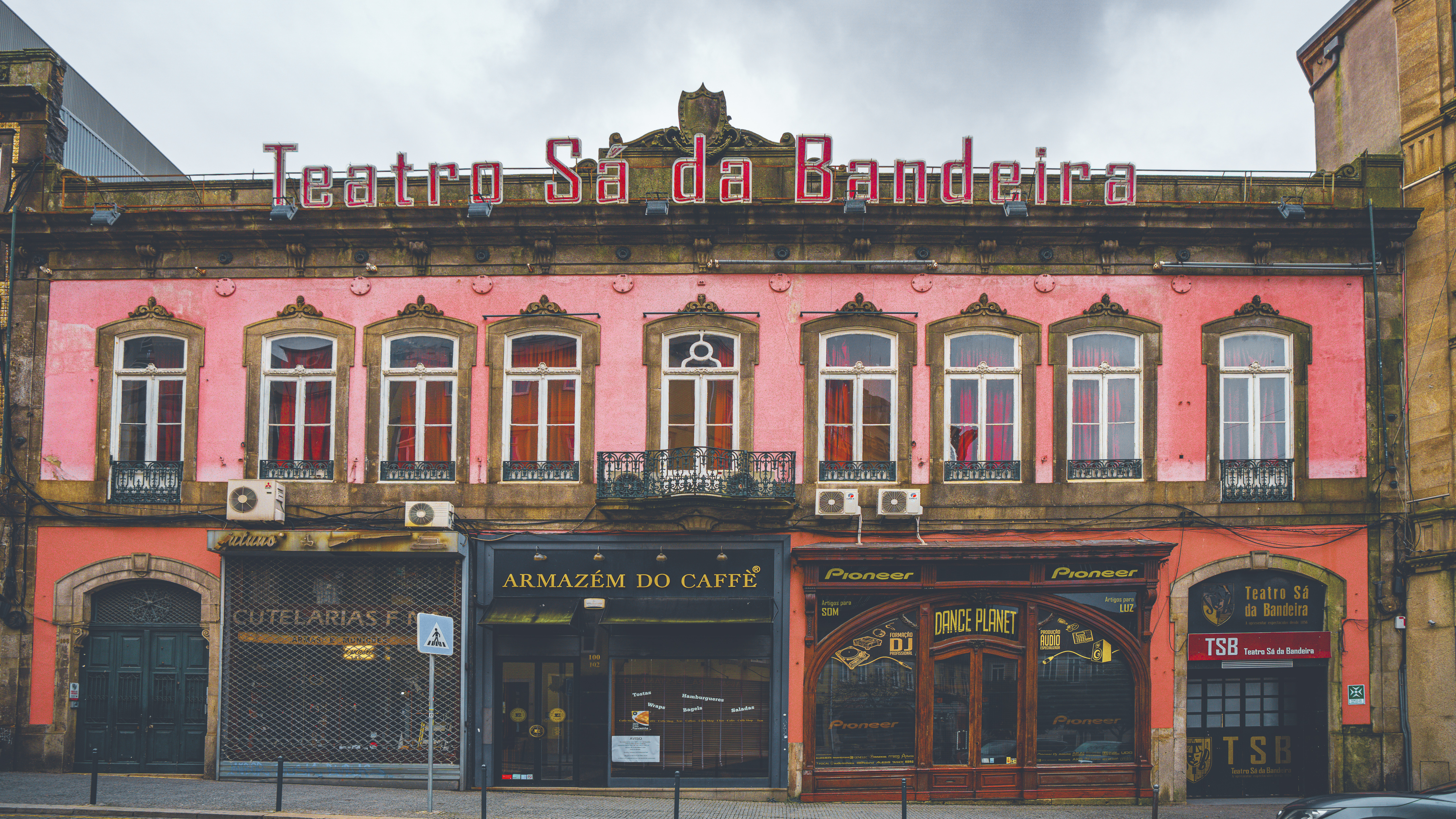
Teatro Sá da Bandeira front view December 25, 2022

== Features ==
The building includes, in addition to the theater, three stores, and has a total of five thousand square meters of covered area.

In addition to the main room, the theater has two more cinemas.
