= List of Portuguese films of the 1940s =

A list of films produced in the Cinema of Portugal ordered by year of release in the 1940s. For an alphabetical list of Portuguese films see Category:Portuguese films

== 1940s ==
Title	Director	Cast	Genre	Notes
1940
João Ratão	Jorge Brum do Canto		Drama	
1941
O Pai Tirano (The Tyrant Father)	António Lopes Ribeiro		Comedy	
1942
Ala-Arriba!	José Leitão de Barros			
Aniki-Bóbó	Manoel de Oliveira			
O Pátio das Cantigas (Songs' Yard)	Francisco Ribeiro			
1943
O Costa do Castelo	Arthur Duarte			
1944
A Menina da Rádio	Arthur Duarte			
1945
A Vizinha do Lado	António Lopes Ribeiro			
Sonho de Amor	Carlos Porfírio			
Três Dias Sem Deus	Bárbara Virgínia			
1946
Camões	José Leitão de Barros			
1947
O Leão da Estrela (Estrela's Lion)	Arthur Duarte			
Three Mirrors	Ladislao Vajda	Virgílio Teixeira, Paola Barbara, João Villaret	Mystery drama	Co-production with Spain
1948
Fado, História d'uma Cantadeira	Perdigão Queiroga			
Um Grito na Noite	Carlos Porfírio			
1949
Vendaval Maravilhoso	José Leitão de Barros			
