= Comédia à portuguesa =

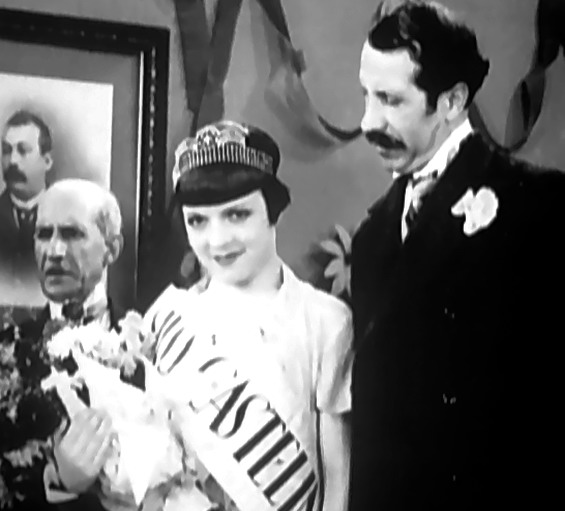
Scene from The Song of Lisbon with Beatriz Costa and António Silva. The film was style-defining for the comédia à portuguesa and turned its main actors into film stars.

Comédia à portuguesa (Portuguese pronunciation: [kuˈmɛðjɐ a puɾtuˈɣezɐ]; Portuguese Comedy) is a term conventionally used to refer to the genre of popular Portuguese film comedies made in the 1930s and 1940s. The light-hearted comedies are predominantly set in petit-bourgeois milieus in traditional Lisbon neighbourhoods and are often accompanied by musical performances, mainly light music, fados or folk songs. The popular revue (teatro de revista), the national equivalent of the North American vaudeville or the British music hall, had a marked influence over the comédia à portuguesa, including the talents of the actors, writers, and musicians.

The Song of Lisbon ("A Canção de Lisboa", 1933), the first sound feature film fully produced in Portugal, is considered to be the first style-defining comédia à portuguesa. This and a number of subsequent films are still popular in Portugal today, and the term comédia à portuguesa has become an enduring common term for the successful classic comedies of Portuguese cinema.

== History ==
1933 not only saw the premiere of The Song of Lisbon, but also the establishment of António de Oliveira Salazar's authoritarian regime, the Estado Novo, which would last until the Carnation Revolution in 1974. The nascent comédia à portuguesa films — which drew much inspiration from the already popular revue (teatro de revista), as well as sharing the talents of actors and writers — were aimed at light-hearted entertainment for an audience that had been suffering from the social and economic upheaval of the interwar period, namely the unstable First Portuguese Republic and its ultimate failure and, later, the restrictions brought about by the outbreak of the Second World War in 1939. In that regard, the comédia à portuguesa became something of a welcome ally for the nascent authoritarian regime: in a war-ravaged Europe, the picture of a safe, carefree, orderly Portugal that was always subliminally conveyed, corresponded to the ideas of the propaganda that promoted the dictator Salazar as a caring guarantee of peace and progress in a country rich in tradition that he had successfully kept out of the war. In the films, the characters often pursue different interests or defend different opinions or get into arguments, but in the end invariably find solidarity and peaceful coexistence, which was also to be understood as a parable for a society in which resistance beyond slight differences of opinion was to be considered bad and pointless.

However, Salazar's regime was slow to systematically employ cinema as a form of propaganda, perhaps because of the low motivation to finance it due to the national panorama of cinema-going: the audience was relatively restricted by the low number of venues in which films could be exhibited, most of them in major urban areas (it has been estimated that in the 1930s, less than a third of the population of Portugal had access to the cinema).

Although the plot and characters of the comédia à portuguesa films are often tacitly in-tune with the Estado Novo ideology and its values, there are very few examples of feature films that were explicitly commissioned or financed by the regime as a form of propaganda (A Revolução de Maio, 1937, and Feitiço do Império, 1940, both directed by António Lopes Ribeiro, and, to a lesser extent, Camões, 1946, by Leitão de Barros), and none of them comedies. Instead, the comédias à portuguesa are part of a "contextual or indirect" form of propaganda, as termed by historian Luís Reis Torgal, as they were conditioned by protectionist legislation, government subsidies and prizes and, most importantly, by the all-encompassing network of censorship services. António Ferro, the Director of the Secretariat for National Propaganda (Secretariado da Propaganda Nacional) called the comedies of the 1930s and 1940s "the cancer of national cinema, two or three exceptions aside"; however, as the public preferred the comédias à portuguesa to the more orthodox ideological films produced by the regime, they were frequently box-office hits and, ironically, were probably much more effective than the latter as a means of propaganda.

== Films generally considered comédias à portuguesa ==
- 1933: A Canção de Lisboa, director: Cottinelli Telmo
- 1937: Maria Papoila, director: José Leitão de Barros
- 1938: Aldeia da Roupa Branca, director: Chianca de Garcia
- 1940: João Ratão, director: Jorge Brum do Canto
- 1941: O Pai Tirano, director: António Lopes Ribeiro
- 1942: O Pátio das Cantigas, director: Francisco Ribeirinho
- 1943: O Costa do Castelo, director: Arthur Duarte
- 1944: A Menina da Rádio, director: Arthur Duarte
- 1945: A Vizinha do Lado, director: António Lopes Ribeiro
- 1947: O Leão da Estrela, director: Arthur Duarte
- 1950: O Grande Elias, director: Arthur Duarte
- 1951: Sonhar É Fácil, director: Perdigão Queiroga
- 1952: Os Três da Vida Airada, director: Perdigão Queiroga
- 1953: Rosa de Alfama, director: Henrique Campos
- 1958: A Costureirinha da Sé, director: Manuel Guimarães
