= Cinema of Portugal =

- No. of screens: 563 (2024)
  - Per capita: 5.32 per 100,000 (2024)
- Main distributors: Cinemundo 47.9% NOS Audiovisuais 29.2% Big Picture 2 Films 15.0% Pris Audiovisuais 2.8%

Produced feature films (2024)
- Total: 48
- Fictional: 27
- Documentary: 21

Number of admissions (2024)
- Total: 11,864,190
  - Per capita: 1.1
- National films: 536,146 (4.5%)

Gross box office (2024)
- Total: €73.3 million
- National films: €3.08 million (4.2%)

The Cinema of Portugal started with the birth of the medium in the late 19th century. Cinema was introduced in Portugal in 1896 with the screening of foreign films and the first Portuguese film was Saída do Pessoal Operário da Fábrica Confiança, made in the same year. The first movie theater opened in 1904 and the first scripted Portuguese film was O Rapto de Uma Actriz (1907). The first all-talking sound film, A Severa, was made in 1931. Starting in 1933, with A Canção de Lisboa, the Golden Age would last the next two decades, with films such as O Pátio das Cantigas (1942) and A Menina da Rádio (1944). Aniki-Bóbó (1942), Manoel de Oliveira's first feature film, marked a milestone, with a realist style predating Italian neorealism by a few years. In the 1950s the industry stagnated. The early 1960s saw the birth of the Cinema Novo (literally "New Cinema") movement, showing realism in film, in the vein of Italian neorealism and the French New Wave, with films like Dom Roberto (1962) and Os Verdes Anos (1963). The movement became particularly relevant after the Carnation Revolution of 1974. In 1989, João César Monteiro's Recordações da Casa Amarela won the Silver Lion at the Venice Film Festival and in 2009, João Salaviza's Arena won the Short Film Palme d'Or at the Cannes Film Festival. Several other Portuguese films have been in competition for major film awards like the Palme d'Or and the Golden Bear. João Sete Sete (2006) was the first Portuguese animated feature film. Portuguese cinema is significantly supported by the State, with the government's Instituto do Cinema e do Audiovisual giving films financial support.

== Silent films ==
Portuguese film history began on 18 June 1896, at the Real Colyseu da Rua da Palma nº 288, in Lisbon, when Edwin Rousby presented Robert William Paul's Animatograph, using a Teatrograph projector. This places the debut of film in Portugal around six months after the Lumière brothers' inaugural presentation in Paris.

=== Early days ===
The Portuguese audience was familiar with photographic projection, first from cycloramas, dioramas and stereoscopic views and, later, from the magic lantern, with the projection of transparent photographs through a glass plate then coloured. On 28 December 1894, the German photographer Carlos Eisenlohr opened his "Imperial Exhibition" at the galleries of the Avenida Palace Hotel. He presented a novelty to this already knowledgeable Lisbon audience: the live photograph – shown not through an Edison Kinetograph, as announced at the time, but by the Elektrotachyscop or Schnellseher, also called the Electro-Tachiscópio Eisenlohr, an invention by Ottomar Anschutz. The device projected images of actions, of a dog passing by or the galloping of a horse, contained in small disks that produced moving images of extremely short periods.

In the beginning of 1895, the tobacco shop Tabacaria Neves presented Edison's Kinetoscope (in fact, a copy of said invention, built in London by Robert William Paul, ordered by the Greek George Georgiades, who presented the machine in Lisbon). Unlike preceding inventions, the Kinestoscope allowed individual viewing and a film made up of 1,380 photographs enabling a 20-second projection of 20 seconds.

The machine that was used for movies at the Real Colyseu was not the Lumiére brothers' Cinematograph, but a competitor, the Theatrograph, by Robert W. Paul. The machine projected behind the screen, allowing life-size images to appear for about a minute. The first presentation of it was well-received and in the following months, many of the same machines swirled in the cinemas of Lisbon, vying for the favour of movie audiences.

At the Real Colyseu of the Rua da Palma of António Santos Júnior, on 18 June 1896, Edwin Rousby showed films by Robert William Paul's production house, for whom Rousby worked. About a minute in length each, these "animated views" were shot by operators who worked for the British producer: "Parisian balls", "The Pont Neuf in Paris", "The Train", "The Serpentine Dance", "A Barber and Shoeshine Store in Washington".

Rousby then met Manuel Maria da Costa Veiga, a photographer with electrical and mechanical skills, who assisted him in preparing his sessions. Costa Veiga himself began acting as an exhibitor, acquiring a projectoscope from Edison that same year and showing films in Lisbon venues.

Robert W. Paul also sent his operator Henry Short to southern Europe, to record the animated views of landscapes for use by the English producing house. Short passed through Portugal, registering several views that, although destined to be shown in London, would be integrated into Rousby's program at his Portuguese sessions in 1897.

His success is overwhelming, and he prolonged his stays in Portugal and increased the sessions. However, when Rousby proceeded with his tour to the Teatro-Circo Príncipe Real, in Porto, the animated photograph also gained a professional who would go on to found Portuguese cinema: Aurélio da Paz dos Reis.

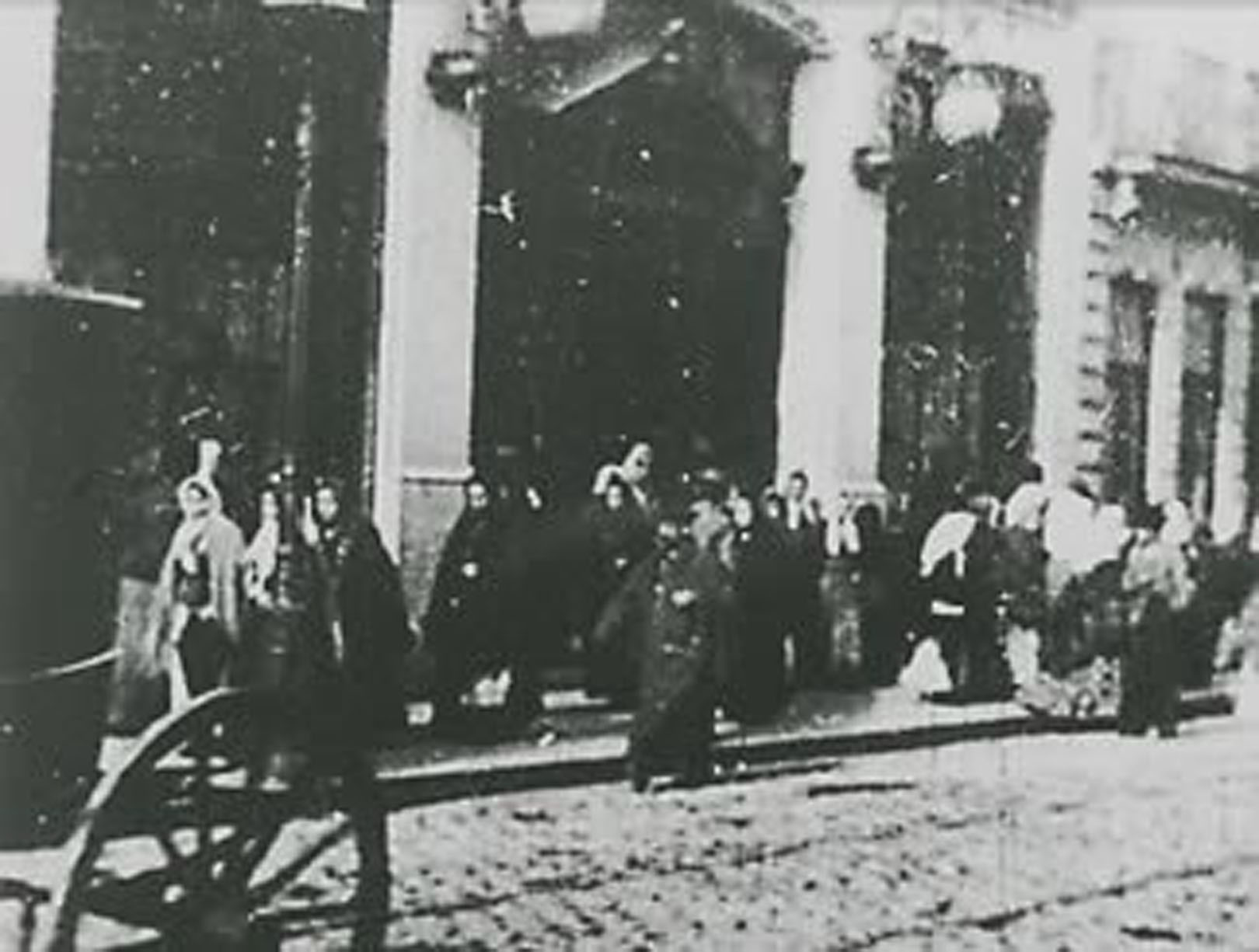
Saída do Pessoal da Fábrica Confiança, the first Portuguese film, by Aurélio Paz dos Reis

From July to August, Rousby presented his films at the Teatro do Príncipe Real (now the Teatro Sá da Bandeira), without achieving, however, the level of success in Lisbon.

=== Pioneers and the producing houses ===
Three years after beginning his exhibition business, Costa Veiga purchased a movie camera and made first film, Aspectos da Praia de Cascais ("Views of the Cascais beach"), with images of King D. Carlos bathing in Cascais. He began recording official visits and other relevant national political events. He founded the first Portuguese production house, Portugal Film, headquartered close to his home in Algés.

In 1909, Portugália Film, made up of João Freire Correia and Manuel Cardoso, was established in Lisbon, financed by D. Nuno de Almada, and the "Empresa Cinematográfica Ideal," Júlio Costa. Freire Correia, a photographer, bought a projector for the opening of the Salão Ideal ao Loreto in 1904, the first Portuguese cinema. He founded his production company five years later, for which he'd make several films, including Batalha de Flores ("Battle of Flowers") that garnered vast success. He was also the cinematographer of O Rapto de Uma Actriz ("The kidnapping of an Actress"), the first scripted Portuguese film, directed by Lino Ferreira in 1907.

Freire Correia directed two documentaries of significant success in 1909: A Cavalaria Portuguesa ("The Portuguese Cavalry") and the O Terramoto de Benavente ("The Earthquake of Benavente"). The first already showed some technique of image capturing, displaying the prowess of Portuguese cavalry in such a way to create a sense of danger, however fictitious, to the audience. The earthquake was filmed in April, and shown two days later – a remarkable speed – and 22 copies were exported abroad. He would also be responsible for the production of two versions of Os Crimes de Diogo Alves ("The Crimes of Diogo Alves"), whose direction he entrusted first to Lino Ferreira in 1909 but that remained incomplete, and a second with João Tavares directing one in 1911.

Early notable attempts at sound films include the incomplete Grisette (1908) directed by Freire Correia used adaptations of the Gaumont method by which he attempted to synchronise image and sound. Portugália also produced the first film adaptation of a literary work: Carlota Ângela was based in the work of the same name by Camilo Castelo Branco and was directed by João Tavares, in 1912.

Júlio Costa, partnering with João Almeida, acquired the Salão Ideal from Freire Correia and Nuno Almada in 1908 and started the Empresa Cinematográfica Ideal production and distribution house. Remodelled and appropriately refitted, the Salão Ideal presented a predecessor of the talkies, the "Animatógrafo Falado" (Spoken Animatograph), where a group of people read the script and produced sound in synch with the film's projection. The group was made up of volunteer firefighters of Ajuda, of which not only Júlio Costa but also António Silva, the actor of the Portuguese Golden Age comedies, were members.

While waiting for the construction of his studio at Rua Marquês Ponte de Lima, Júlio Costa began filming "views". He begins filming features with Chantecler Atraiçoado ("Chantecler Betrayed") and then with Rainha depois de Morta ("Queen After Dead"), by Carlos Santos, the first Portuguese film with a historic motif. Júlio Costa's company pioneered grouping, production, distribution and exhibition, together for the first time. The company would halt activity after a suspicious fire.

In 1918, Lusitânia Film was founded, a production company with an ambitious outlook, led by Celestino Soares and Luís Reis Santos. They remodelled the old Portugália Film studio, in São Bento, and began filming documentaries. The same year, two short films are made outdoors by Costa Veigam, directed by the young Leitão de Barros: Malmequer ("Daisy") and Mal de Espanha ("Evil From Spain"). The shooting of O Homem dos Olhos Tortos ("The Man with the Twisted Eyes") began, the story based on a Reinaldo Ferreira police serial and directed by Leitão de Barros. However, due to financial pressures, the film was never completed. A well-organized conspiracy would close down the company that intended to film A Severa as its next production.

After the closing of the "cycle of Lisbon", the first Porto production house was founded, which ensured for some years the continuous production of cinema in the country.

=== Foreign cinematographers ===
After founding a production company bearing his name in 1910, the Porto exhibitor Nunes de Mattos, added Invicta Film to its corporate name two years later. The company filmed current events and documentaries, among them O Naufrágio do Silurian ("The Sinking of the Silurian"), of which 108 copies were shipped to Europe. In November 1917, de Mattos founded the second "Invicta Film, Lda", increasing the number of partners and equity. Henrique Alegria took over art direction and they acquired the Quinta da Prelada, in Porto, where the studios and laboratories of the producer were built.

In 1918 they left for Paris, and brought back a technical team from the Pathé studios led by Georges Pallu, a director who would author virtually all the feature films of the Porto producing house. Also in the team were André Lecointe, architect-decorator; Albert Durot, camera operator and Georges and Valentine Coutable – the couple who would be, respectively, the chief lab and chief editor. Durot would later be replaced by Maurice Laumann, also from Pathé.

For six years, Invicta Film produced several films and documentaries, enriching the Portuguese film landscape. In 1924, however, the company experienced severe financial distress, leading to the laying off all its personnel and continuing only lab work. They shut down in 1928.

Rino Lupo, another milestone of cinematography, showed up on the scene through Pallu, who approved his direction of Mulheres da Beira ("Women from Beira"), after a tale by Abel Botelho, with photography by Artur Costa de Macedo. Though the financial disagreements and the unfulfilment of deadlines forced his removal from the company, Lupo still directed Os Lobos ("The Wolves"), another pearl of the Portuguese silent cinema. He directed others, but without the quality of his earlier works.

Three other companies are set up in the '20s to fill in the studios gap: Caldevilla Film, Fortuna Film and Pátria Film. These also follow the Portuguese pattern, hiring foreign technicians for their experience in Portuguese productions. Although the directors brought from French production houses were presented as recognised stars in their countries, in fact, they often built their careers without having the claimed background.

Raul de Caldevilla founded in 1920 his Caldevilla Film, placing production in Lisbon, at Quinta das Conchas, in Lumiar. Frenchman Maurice Mariaud was the director chosen for the works Os Faroleiros ("The Lighthouse Men") and As Pupilas do Senhor Reitor ("The Wards of the Dean"), for the studio's only two productions. The company would shut down due to an acute financial disagreement among its partners.

Virgínia de Castro e Almeida, a children's book writer, founded in Lisbon the studio Fortuna Film, and hires a French lawyer, Roger Lion, to direct productions based upon her books. Lion brought along his wife, actress Gil-Clary, Maxudian, and the cameramen Daniel Quintin and Marcel Bizot, and they shoot A Sereia de Pedra ("The Stone Mermaid") and Olhos da Alma ("Eyes of the Soul"), the latter shot in Nazaré, in what was its first screen register.

Henrique Alegria left Invicta Film in 1922, to found Pátria Film with Raul Lopes Freire. They bought Quinta das Conchas, where Maurice Mariaud directs O Fado. This company too would cease to operate after shooting Aventuras de Agapito – Fotografia Comprometedora ("Adventures of Agapito – Compromising Photograph"), the fourth film directed by Roger Lion in Portugal.

=== New generation ===
At the end of the twenties, the "young Turks" begin the era of the cinema estates, with the return of Leitão de Barros and the emergence of young António Lopes Ribeiro (who would soon launch Manoel de Oliveira), Jorge Brum do Canto, Chianca de Garcia and Arthur Duarte. Their agenda was to move away from the previous productions, taking inspiration in the aesthetic designs of the French, German and Russian cinemas. Casts also follow this move, bringing to the screen the stars of the Revista, in contrast to the theatre world. Stars such as Eduardo Brazão, Brunilde Júdice, António Pinheiro or Pato Moniz fade, and a new school emerges with the presence of Vasco Santana, António Silva, Maria Matos, Ribeirinho or Maria Olguim.

At the same time, the state's relationship with cinema was also to change from the end of the '20s. The installed powers understood these young people dominated the cinema press and influenced the masses with their perspectives and wisely viewed the industry as a privileged means of propaganda for their new regime.

António Lopes Ribeiro launched his career benefiting from the 100 meters law. He films Uma Batida em Malpique ("A huntin Malpique") and Bailando ao Sol ("Dancing in the Sun") (1928), the latter with photography by Aníbal Contreiras. He later departed with Leitão de Barros in a visit to the main European studios, where he'll meet Dziga Vertov and Eisenstein.

De Barros, who screened at Lopes Ribeiro's home the 9,5 mm film he had made with his brother-in-law in Nazaré, was spurred by the trip and returned to filming with Nazaré, Praia de Pescadores ("Nazaré, Beach of Fishermen"). Again in Nazaré, de Barros films Maria do Mar ("Mary of the Sea"), the second ethnofiction in cinema history, and a milestone for up until then bleak Portuguese cinematography aesthetics. He also directed Lisboa, Crónica Anedótica ("Lisbon, an Anecdotal Chronicle") (1929), where in a series of multiple city scenes, he displays Chaby Pinheiro, repeat stars Adelina Abranches and Alves da Cunha, Nascimento Fernandes, and the unforgettable Vasco Santana and Beatriz Costa.

Inspired by Marcel l'Herbier, Jorge Brum do Canto opened with A Dança dos Paroxismos ("The Dance of the Paroxisms") in 1928, playing the main role with his own script. It opened only to a private audience in 1930, however, to only be seen again in 1984.

Manoel de Oliveira shot Douro, Faina Fluvial ("Douro, River Works"), with Lopes Ribeiro persuading him to take it to the V International Critics Congress, where it received the praise of Pirandello. But again it will be Leitão de Barros who leaves an imprint in movie history, with A Severa, based upon the work by Júlio Dantas, with the direction of the first Portuguese talkie. A new era of Portuguese cinema was about to begin.

== Sound films ==
=== 1930s–1940s ===
Established on June 3, 1932, Tobis Portuguesa would become one of the largest film production and lab processing companies in the country. It would produce many of the major works in Portuguese cinema for three decades.

With the beginning of the Estado Novo right-wing dictatorship in 1933, a new genre of film started, based on the comedy and musical genres, famously the "comédia à portuguesa", with the focus on contemporary life and light matters, and the intention of taking the minds of the people from the difficult times faced.

1942 saw the release of Aniki-Bóbó, the first full-length fictional film from Manoel de Oliveira, who would only return to fiction film-making twenty-one years later. It marked a milestone in Portuguese film not only because it differed from the tone most in vogue at the time, as it dealt with social issues, but also because it predated the first Italian neo-realism movies by a few years.

The Golden Age, as it is known, began that same year with the release of A Canção de Lisboa, and dominated the country for the next two decades. Other famous titles from this popular era are Aldeia da Roupa Branca (1938), O Pátio das Cantigas and O Pai Tirano (1941), O Costa do Castelo (1943), A Menina da Rádio (1944) and O Leão da Estrela (1947).

During this period historic films also emerged as an important genre in the Portuguese industry, as a medium for the state party to develop its nationalist propaganda and conservative values, namely As Pupilas do Senhor Reitor (1935), Bocage (1936), Amor de Perdição (1943), Inês de Castro (1945), Camões (1946) and Frei Luís de Sousa (1950). A subgenre of these nationalist films were those related to the culture of Fado and the rise to popularity of Amália Rodrigues, the great name of Portuguese song. Some of those films were Capas Negras and Fado, História de Uma Cantadeira, both from 1947.

Camões, directed by José Leitão de Barros, was an official selection at the first Cannes Film Festival in 1946.

=== 1950s ===
The Fifties were mainly years of stagnation with the continuity of the same movies made in the earlier decades, government censorship and glorification of the colonial empire – see Chaimite (1953); although the first signs of the winds to come were being given by films like Saltimbancos (1951) and Nazaré (1952), both directed by Manuel Guimarães and inspired by the Italian neo-realism.

In 1958 opens the Portuguese Cinematheque with a retrospective of American movies that inspired the French filmmakers of the Nouvelle Vague, an event lauded by then new critics Alberto Seixas Santos e António Pedro Vasconcelos.

In 1959 Portuguese Rhapsody, directed by João Mendes, was in competition for the Palme d'Or at the 1959 Cannes Film Festival.

=== 1960s–1970s ===
The new decade brought a new generation of films, led by Dom Roberto (1962), Os Verdes Anos and Pássaros de Asas Cortadas (1963). The new phase was named Cinema Novo or Novo Cinema (New Cinema), and it refers to Portuguese cinema made between 1963 and the revolution in 1974 by directors such as Fernando Lopes, Paulo Rocha or António da Cunha Telles, amongst others. Like other new waves of the period, the influence of Italian Neo-Realism and the burgeoning ideas of the Nouvelle Vague could be felt keenly.

The term Novo Cinema is now used to avoid confusion with the Brazilian movement of the same name. This movement gains particular relevance after the Carnation Revolution, pursuing certain experiences of the French New Wave, both in the field of visual anthropology and of political cinema. The generation of the seventies, taking advantage of the new liberties, explores realism and legend, politics and ethnography, until the late eighties, in conjunction with some directors of the liberated colonies, such as Flora Gomes. Portugal has a notable tradition in the field of docufiction and ethnofiction since Leitão de Barros, who was a contemporary of Robert Flaherty.

Films during this period also include Belarmino (1964), Domingo à Tarde (1965), Sete balas para Selma (1967) and O Cerco (1969). In 1973 The Vows, directed by António de Macedo, was in competition for the Grand Prix at the 1973 Cannes Film Festival.

=== 1980s ===
A Ilha dos Amores, directed by Paulo Rocha, was in competition for the Palme d'Or at the 1982 Cannes Film Festival. Other accolades from this period include, in 1985 Manoel de Oliveira winning an Honorary Golden Lion at the Venice Film Festival; O Bobo, directed by José Álvaro Morais, winning the Golden Leopard at the 1987 Locarno International Film Festival; The Cannibals, directed by de Oliveira, in competition for the Palme d'Or at the 1988 Cannes Film Festival; and in 1989 Recordações da Casa Amarela, directed by João César Monteiro, winning the Silver Lion at the 46th Venice International Film Festival.

=== 1990s ===
In 1994 Maria de Medeiros won the Volpi Cup for Best Actress at the 51st Venice International Film Festival for her work in Três Irmãos, directed by Teresa Villaverde. The Convent, directed by Manoel de Oliveira, was in competition for the Palme d'Or at the 1995 Cannes Film Festival. Po di Sangui, directed by Flora Gomes, was in competition for the Palme d'Or at the 1996 Cannes Film Festival. In 1997 Genealogies of a Crime, directed by Raúl Ruiz, was in competition for the Golden Bear at the 47th Berlin International Film Festival. The Letter, directed by Manoel de Oliveira, was in competition for the Palme d'Or and it won the Jury Prize at the 1999 Cannes Film Festival. Time Regained, directed by Raúl Ruiz, was also in competition for the Palme d'Or.

=== 2000s ===
Notable accolades of this decade were I'm Going Home, directed by Manoel de Oliveira, in competition for the Palme d'Or at the 2001 Cannes Film Festival; The Uncertainty Principle, also directed by de Oliveira, was in competition for the same award the following year. In 2004 de Oliveira won an Honorary Golden Lion at the Venice Film Festival.

In 2005, thirteen Portuguese feature films released, one an animation co-produced with Spain, Midsummer Dream. The most successful film of the year was O Crime do Padre Amaro, with more than 300,000 viewers and grossing more than 1.3 million euros. The following year, 22 feature films were released, five of them documentaries. The most successful film that year was Filme da Treta, with more than 270,000 viewers, grossing more than 1 million euros. In 2006 there were 19 feature films produced. In 2007, 15, in 2008, 21 and in 2009, 23. Colossal Youth, directed by Pedro Costa, was in competition for the Palme d'Or at the 2006 Cannes Film Festival. Three years later, Arena, directed by João Salaviza, won the Short Film Palme d'Or at the 2009 Cannes Film Festival.

The first Portuguese animated feature film, João Sete Sete, premiered in 2006 on Cinanima.

=== 2010s ===
In 2010 Portugal produced 22 feature films. The next year, it produced 19, with the most commercially successful being Blood of My Blood by João Canijo with 20,953 views and a gross of €97,800. The share of native cinema at the Portuguese box office was 0.7%.

On the artistic side, one of the most successful films was Joaquim Sapinho's This Side of Resurrection, which premiered at the Visions programme at the Toronto International Film Festival with a US premiere at the Harvard Film Archive in Boston.

At the 62nd Berlin International Film Festival, in 2012, Tabu, directed by Miguel Gomes, was in competition for the Golden Bear and Rafa, directed by João Salaviza, won the Golden Bear for Best Short Film. The Lines of Wellington was in competition for the Golden Lion at the 69th Venice International Film Festival. The highest grossing Portuguese film of the decade was O Pátio das Cantigas with a €3.1 million gross, followed by 7 Pecados Rurais with €1.676 million.

== Festivals ==
- MOTELx: Lisbon International Horror Film Festival
- Lisbon & Estoril Film Festival
- IndieLisboa
- Curtas Vila do Conde - International Film Festival
- DocLisboa
- Monstra
- Caminhos do Cinema Português
- Fantasporto

== See also ==
- List of Portuguese films
- List of Portuguese film directors
- List of Portuguese film actors
- List of film festivals in Portugal
- Sophia Awards
- Cinemateca Portuguesa
- Cinema of the world
- The School of Reis
- Media of Portugal

== Bibliography ==
- (in Portuguese) Cinema – bibliography by José de Matos-Cruz
- (in Portuguese) Silent film at Amor de Perdição.
- Ribeiro, Félix O Cinema Português antes do Sonoro, Esboço Históriconema Português, Terra Livre, Lisbon, Portugal, 1978.
- Ribeiro, Félix, Panorama do Cinema Português, Lisbon, Portugal.
- Bandeira, José Gomes, Porto: 100 anos de cinema português, Câmara Municipal do Porto, Porto, Portugal, 1996.
- Antunes, João and Matos-Cruz, José de, Cinema Português 1896–1998, Lusomundo, Lisbon, Portugal, 1997.
- Duarte, Fernando, Primitivos do Cinema Português, ed. Cinecultura, Lisbon, Portugal, 1960.
- Faria de Almeida, M., Resumo da História do Cinema, RTP Centro de Formação, Lisbon, Portugal, 1982.
- Ferreira, António J., O Cinema Chegou a Portugal, – Palestra Baseada no Livro A Fotografia Animada em Portugal 1894-1895-1896-1897 – 1896.
- Ferreira, António J., A Fotografia Animada em Portugal, 1894–1896–1897, ed. Cinemateca Portuguesa, Lisbon, Portugal, 1986.
- Nobre, Roberto, Singularidades do Cinema Português, Portugália Editora, Lisbon, Portugal.
- Passek, Jean-Loup, ed. (1982). Le cinéma portugais. Paris: Centre national d'art et de culture Georges Pompidou. ISBN 9782864250296. OCLC 9280981.
- Pina, Luís de, História do Cinema Português, Colecção Saber nº190, Publicações Europa-América, Lisboa, 1986.
- Pina, Luís de, Aventura do Cinema Português, ed. Vega, Lisbon, Portugal, 1977
- Pina, Luís de, Documentarismo Português, Instituto Português de Cinema, 1977.
- Pina, Luís de, Panorama do Cinema Português, Terra Livre, Lisbon, Portugal, 1978.
