= List of Portuguese film directors =

The following is a list of Portuguese film directors.

== A ==
- Alberto Seixas Santos
- Alexandre Valente
- António Campos
- António de Macedo
- António da Cunha Telles
- António Ferreira
- António Lopes Ribeiro
- António de Macedo
- António-Pedro Vasconcelos
- Armando de Miranda
- Arthur Duarte

== C ==
- Chianca de Garcia
- Cottinelli Telmo

== D ==
- David Bonneville

== E ==
- Edgar Pêra
- Eduardo Geada
- Eduardo Guedes

== F ==
- Fernando Fragata
- Fernando Lopes
- Fernando Vendrell

== G ==
- Glauber Rocha

== J ==
- João Botelho
- João Canijo
- João César Monteiro
- João Mário Grilo
- João Ponces de Carvalho
- João Pedro Rodrigues
- João Salaviza
- Joaquim Leitão
- Joaquim Sapinho
- Jorge Brum do Canto
- José Álvaro Morais
- José Fonseca e Costa

== L ==
- Leitão de Barros
- Leonel Vieira
- Luís Filipe Rocha

== M ==
- Manuel Carvalheiro
- Manuel da Fonseca
- Manoel de Oliveira
- Manuel Mozos
- Marco Martins
- Maria de Medeiros
- Mário Barroso
- Miguel Gomes

== P ==
- Paulo Rocha
- Pedro Costa
- Perdigão Queiroga

== R ==
- Raquel Freire
- Rita Azevedo Gomes

== T ==
- Tiago Guedes
