= List of Portuguese films of the 1960s =

A list of films produced in the Cinema of Portugal ordered by year of release in the 1960s. For an alphabetical list of Portuguese films see Category:Portuguese films

== 1960s ==
Title	Director	Cast	Genre	Notes
1960
1961
1962
Dom Roberto	José Ernesto de Sousa			
O Milionário	Perdigão Queiroga			
Retalhos da Vida de Um Médico	Jorge Brum do Canto			Entered into the 13th Berlin International Film Festival
1963
Rite of Spring	Manoel de Oliveira			
Os Verdes Anos (The Green Years)	Paulo Rocha			
1964
Belarmino	Fernando Lopes		Biographical documentary	
Uma Hora de Amor	Augusto Fraga			
1965
Vinte e Nove Irmãos	Augusto Fraga			
1966
A Voz do Sangue	Augusto Fraga			
1967
Sete Balas Para Selma	António de Macedo			
1968
A Cruz de Ferro	Jorge Brum do Canto			
1969
Bonança & C.a	Pedro Martins			
