= Carmen Dolores (actress) =

Portuguese actress (1924–2021)

- Born: Carmen Dolores Cohen Sarmento; 22 April 1924; Lisbon, Portugal
- Died: 16 February 2021 (aged 96); Lisbon
- Resting place: Lumiar Cemetery, Lisbon
- Occupation: actress
- Years active: 60
- Known for: Lisbon theatre, films and television
- Spouse: Vítor Manuel Carneiro Veres
- Awards: Order of Prince Henry; Order of Merit (Portugal)

Carmen Dolores Cohen Sarmento Veres GOIH, GOM (1924–2021) was a Portuguese stage, radio and television, and film actress and writer, with a career that lasted 60 years.

== Early life ==
Dolores was born on 22 April 1924 in the Portuguese capital, Lisbon. She was the daughter of José de Matos Sarmento de Beja, a journalist, who died when she was 15 and María del Pilar Manuela Cohen y Muñoz who was of Spanish and Jewish descent. Her brother, António Sarmento, was also an actor. Dolores attended the Liceu D. Filipa de Lencastre in Lisbon. Introduced by António, she first became known at the age of twelve in a radio play on Rádio Clube Português, in which she performed alongside actors such as Rogério Paulo, Alves da Costa, Isabel Wolmar, and Laura Alves. She was reading poems on the radio at the age of 14. Dolores married Vítor Manuel Carneiro Veres in Vila Nova de Gaia near Porto on 30 April 1947. Her husband was an engineer.

== Career ==
She made her film debut at the age of 19, as the protagonist of Amor de Perdição (Love of Perdition - 1943), a film based on the 19th-century Portuguese novel of the same name by Camilo Castelo Branco, adapted by António Lopes Ribeiro. This was followed by Um Homem à Direitas (1945), directed by Jorge Brum do Canto, A Vizinha do Lado (1945) by Lopes Ribeiro and Camões (1946) directed by José Leitão de Barros. She started to appear in the live theatre in 1945, as part of the successful Os Comediantes de Lisboa (Lisbon Comedians) company, based at the Teatro da Trindade. Her first performance was in Electra by Jean Giraudoux, with other plays including The Living Corpse by Leo Tolstoy.

In 1951 Dolores moved to the stage of the D. Maria II National Theatre, under the direction of the Amélia Rey Colaço and Robles Monteiro Company, with several successes, notably Frei Luís de Sousa by Almeida Garrett and A Midsummer Night's Dream by William Shakespeare. In 1958 she moved to the Teatro Avenida, performing in Six Characters in Search of an Author by Luigi Pirandello, among others. In 1961 she created, with other actors, the independent theatre group Teatro Moderno de Lisboa, performing on the stage of the Cinema Império, with new stagings of plays by writers such as Fyodor Dostoevsky, Shakespeare, August Strindberg, John Steinbeck and Georges Feydeau. The company closed in 1965 after support from the Calouste Gulbenkian Foundation was withdrawn following the banning of one of the company's plays by the Estado Novo dictatorship.

After playing some television roles, she returned to the stage in 1969 as the protagonist in The Dance of Death by Strindberg at the Casa da Comédia. In the same year, she performed at the Teatro Laura Alves. Later, in 1975, at the Casa da Comédia under the direction of João Lourenço, she performed in Mother Courage and her Children by Bertold Brecht. With the same director, at Teatro Aberto, she performed Brecht's The Caucasian Chalk Circle.

After living in Paris for several years, she returned to the Portuguese stage in 1983 with a play by Aleksei Arbuzov, directed by František Listopad. Two years later, she was part of the cast of the play Virgínia, by Edna O'Brien produced by the Teatro Experimental de Cascais. She later worked with the Companhia Teatral do Chiado and again with the Teatro Experimental de Cascais.

In the 1980s Dolores worked in cinema with José Fonseca e Costa, in A Mulher do Próximo (1988) and Balada da Praia dos Cães (1987). In 1998 she was directed by Diogo Infante in The Glass Menagerie by Tennessee Williams, at the D. Maria II National Theatre. She also appeared sporadically on television, in the soap operas Passerelle, A Banqueira do Povo and A Lenda da Garça. Her last stage performance was in 2005 in Copenhagen by Michael Frayn, directed by João Lourenço, at the Teatro Aberta.

In the 1990s Dolores was one of the founders, including Raul Solnado and Manuela Maria, of the Casa do Artista, a retirement home in Lisbon for former actors.

== Awards and honours ==
Dolores was made a Grand Officer of the Order of Prince Henry in 2005. She was also awarded the Gold Medal of Lisbon City Council, the Sophia de Carreira award from the Portuguese Cinema Academy, and the António Quadros Theatre Prize, among numerous other awards for her acting.

In July 2018, she was decorated by the President of the Republic, Marcelo Rebelo de Sousa, with the insignia of Grand Officer of the Order of Merit, during a tribute to her held at Teatro da Trindade, which included the premiere of the play Carmen inspired by her autobiographical book, Vozes Dentro de Mim, and the naming of the main hall with her name.

== Publications ==
- Retrato inacabado (Unfinished Portrait - 1984).
- No palco da memória (On the stage of memory - 2013).
- Vozes Dentro de Mim (Voices Inside Me - 2017).

== Death ==
Dolores died on 16 February 2021, in Lisbon. She was buried in the Lumiar Cemetery in Lisbon.

A road was named in her honour in Cascais.
