= 1942 in film =

The year of 1942 in film involved some significant events, in particular the release of a film consistently rated as one of the greatest of all time, Casablanca.

== Events ==
- January 16 – Actress Carole Lombard is killed in a plane crash west of Las Vegas while returning home to Los Angeles from a War Bond tour.
- March 31 – First of the only two screenings of Here Will I Nest, the first dramatic Canadian feature-length film made in colour and the first film to adapt a Canadian play, at a private showing in London, Ontario. It is never commercially released and is mostly lost.
- June 4 – British-set wartime romantic drama Mrs. Miniver, starring Greer Garson and Walter Pidgeon, opens at Radio City Music Hall in New York, in what will become a record-breaking 10-week run. The film becomes MGM's highest-grossing film of the 1940s. At the 15th Academy Awards, Mrs. Miniver wins six awards, including Best Picture, Best Director (for William Wyler), Best Actress (for Greer Garson) and Best Supporting Actress (for Teresa Wright).
- August 8 – Walt Disney's animated film Bambi opens in the United Kingdom.
- November 11 – Road to Morocco, starring Bob Hope, Bing Crosby, and Dorothy Lamour, premieres.
- November 26 – The film Casablanca premieres at the Hollywood Theatre in New York City. Released nationally in the United States on January 23, 1943, it becomes one of the top-grossing pictures of 1943 and goes on to win the Best Picture and Best Director awards at the 16th Academy Awards.

== Academy Awards ==
- Best Picture: Mrs. Miniver – Metro-Goldwyn-Mayer
- Best Director: William Wyler – Mrs. Miniver
- Best Actor: James Cagney – Yankee Doodle Dandy
- Best Actress: Greer Garson – Mrs. Miniver
- Best Supporting Actor: Van Heflin – Johnny Eager
- Best Supporting Actress: Teresa Wright – Mrs. Miniver
- Special Academy Award: In Which We Serve

== Top-grossing films (U.S.) ==
The top ten 1942 released films by box office gross in North America are as follows:

Highest-grossing films of 1942
Rank	Title	Distributor	Domestic rentals
1	Mrs. Miniver	MGM	$5,358,000
2	Random Harvest	MGM	$4,650,000
3	Yankee Doodle Dandy	Warner Bros.	$4,631,000
4	Reap the Wild Wind	Paramount	$4,000,000
5	Road to Morocco	Paramount	$3,800,000
6	Holiday Inn	Paramount	$3,750,000
7	Wake Island	Paramount	$3,500,000
8	The Pride of the Yankees	RKO	$3,332,000
9	Kings Row	Warner Bros.	$3,143,000
10	For Me and My Gal	MGM	$2,894,000

== Films by country/region ==
- Argentina
- Australia
- Austria
- Brazil
- Canada
- China
- Czechoslovakia
- Denmark
- Finland
- France
- Germany
- India
- Italy
- Japan
- Mexico
- Netherlands
- Norway
- Poland
- Portugal
- Soviet Union
- Spain
- Sweden
- United Kingdom
- United States

== Notable films ==
Films produced in the United States unless stated otherwise

=== A ===
- Across the Pacific, directed by John Huston and Vincent Sherman, starring Humphrey Bogart and Mary Astor
- A-Haunting We Will Go, directed by Alfred L. Werker, starring Laurel and Hardy
- All Through the Night, directed by Vincent Sherman, starring Humphrey Bogart and Conrad Veidt
- Andy Hardy's Double Life, directed by George B. Seitz, starring Lewis Stone, Mickey Rooney, Cecilia Parker and Fay Holden
- Arabian Nights, directed by John Rawlins, starring Jon Hall, Maria Montez and Sabu

=== B ===
- Bambi, Disney Classic animated film directed by David Hand
- Basant (Spring), directed by Amiya Chakravorty, starring Madhubala and Mumtaz Shanti – (India)
- The Battle of Midway, documentary film directed by John Ford, narrated by Donald Crisp, Henry Fonda and Jane Darwell
- The Big Blockade, propaganda film directed by Charles Frend, starring Leslie Banks, Michael Redgrave, Will Hay and John Mills – (GB)
- The Big Shot, directed by Lewis Seiler, starring Humphrey Bogart
- The Big Street, directed by Irving Reis, starring Henry Fonda and Lucille Ball
- The Black Sheep of Whitehall, directed by Basil Dearden, starring Will Hay and John Mills – (GB)
- The Black Swan, directed by Henry King, starring Tyrone Power and Maureen O'Hara

=== C ===
- Captains of the Clouds, directed by Michael Curtiz, starring James Cagney
- Casablanca, directed by Michael Curtiz, starring Humphrey Bogart, Ingrid Bergman, Paul Henreid, Claude Rains, Conrad Veidt and Peter Lorre
- Cat People, directed by Jacques Tourneur, starring Simone Simon and Tom Conway
- Commandos Strike at Dawn, directed by John Farrow, starring Paul Muni and Lillian Gish
- The Corpse Vanishes, directed by Wallace Fox, starring Bela Lugosi
- The Courtship of Andy Hardy, directed by George B. Seitz, starring Lewis Stone, Mickey Rooney, Cecilia Parker, Fay Holden and Donna Reed

=== D ===
- Desperate Journey, directed by Raoul Walsh, starring Errol Flynn and Ronald Reagan
- The Devil's Envoys (Les Visiteurs du Soir), directed by Marcel Carné, starring Arletty – (France)

=== E ===
- Eyes in the Night, directed by Fred Zinnemann, starring Edward Arnold, Ann Harding and Donna Reed

=== F ===
- The First of the Few, directed by and starring Leslie Howard, with David Niven – (GB)
- The Fleet's In, directed by Victor Schertzinger, starring Dorothy Lamour and William Holden
- Flying Tigers, directed by David Miller, starring John Wayne
- For Me and My Gal, directed by Busby Berkeley, starring Judy Garland and Gene Kelly
- Four Steps in the Clouds (Quattro passi fra le nuvole), directed by Alessandro Blasetti, starring Gino Cervi – (Italy)

=== G ===
- A Garibaldian in the Convent (Un garibaldino al convento), directed by Vittorio De Sica – (Italy)
- The Gaucho War (La guerra gaucha), directed by Lucas Demare – (Argentina)
- Gentleman Jim, biopic directed by Raoul Walsh, starring Errol Flynn and Alexis Smith
- George Washington Slept Here, directed by William Keighley, starring Jack Benny and Ann Sheridan
- The Ghost of Frankenstein, directed by Erle C. Kenton, starring Lon Chaney Jr., Cedric Hardwicke, Ralph Bellamy and Bela Lugosi
- The Glass Key, directed by Stuart Heisler, starring Brian Donlevy, Veronica Lake and Alan Ladd
- The Goose Steps Out, directed by Will Hay and Basil Dearden – (GB)
- The Great King (Der große König), directed by Veit Harlan, starring Otto Gebühr – (Germany)
- The Great Man's Lady, directed by William A. Wellman, starring Barbara Stanwyck, Joel McCrea and Brian Donlevy

=== H ===
- Her Cardboard Lover, directed by George Cukor, starring Norma Shearer, Robert Taylor and George Sanders
- Holiday Inn, directed by Mark Sandrich, starring Bing Crosby and Fred Astaire

=== I ===
- I Married a Witch, directed by René Clair, starring Fredric March and Veronica Lake
- I Married an Angel, directed by W. S. Van Dyke, starring Jeanette MacDonald and Nelson Eddy
- In Old California, directed by William C. McGann, starring John Wayne
- In This Our Life, directed by John Huston, starring Bette Davis, Olivia de Havilland and George Brent
- In Which We Serve, directed by David Lean and Noël Coward, starring Coward and John Mills – (GB)
- Invisible Agent, directed by Edwin L. Marin, starring Jon Hall, Peter Lorre and Cedric Hardwicke

=== J ===
- Johnny Eager, directed by Mervyn LeRoy, starring Robert Taylor, Lana Turner and Edward Arnold
- Jungle Book, directed by Zoltan Korda, starring Sabu

=== K ===
- Kid Glove Killer, directed by Fred Zinnemann, starring Van Heflin
- Kings Row, directed by Sam Wood, starring Ann Sheridan, Robert Cummings and Ronald Reagan
- Kokoda Front Line!, documentary directed by Ken G. Hall – (Australia)

=== L ===
- Larceny, Inc., directed by Lloyd Bacon, starring Edward G. Robinson, Jane Wyman and Broderick Crawford
- Listen to Britain, propaganda film directed by Humphrey Jennings and Stewart McAllister – (GB)

=== M ===
- The Magnificent Ambersons, directed by Orson Welles, starring Joseph Cotten, Dolores Costello, Anne Baxter and Agnes Moorehead
- The Major and the Minor, directed by Billy Wilder, starring Ginger Rogers and Ray Milland
- The Male Animal, directed by Elliott Nugent, starring Henry Fonda, Olivia de Havilland and Joan Leslie
- The Man Who Came to Dinner, directed by William Keighley, starring Bette Davis, Ann Sheridan and Monty Woolley
- Miss Annie Rooney, directed by Edwin L. Marin, starring Shirley Temple
- Moontide, directed by Archie Mayo, starring Jean Gabin, Ida Lupino, Thomas Mitchell and Claude Rains
- Mrs. Miniver, directed by William Wyler, starring Greer Garson and Walter Pidgeon
- The Mummy's Tomb, directed by Harold Young, starring Lon Chaney Jr.
- The Murderer Lives at Number 21 (L'Assassin habite au 21), directed by Henri-Georges Clouzot, starring Pierre Fresnay – (France)
- My Favorite Blonde, directed by Sidney Lanfield, starring Bob Hope and Madeleine Carroll
- My Gal Sal, directed by Irving Cummings, starring Rita Hayworth and Victor Mature
- My Sister Eileen, directed by Alexander Hall, starring Rosalind Russell

=== N ===
- The Next of Kin, propaganda film directed by Thorold Dickinson, starring Mervyn Johns – (GB)
- Now, Voyager, directed by Irving Rapper, starring Bette Davis, Paul Henreid and Claude Rains

=== O ===
- One of Our Aircraft is Missing, directed by Michael Powell and Emeric Pressburger – (GB)

=== P ===
- The Palm Beach Story, directed by Preston Sturges, starring Claudette Colbert, Joel McCrea, Mary Astor and Rudy Vallée
- Panama Hattie, directed by Norman Z. McLeod, starring Red Skelton, Ann Sothern and Lena Horne
- Pardon My Sarong, directed by Erle C. Kenton, starring Abbott and Costello
- O Pátio das Cantigas (The Courtyard of Songs), directed by Ribeirinho – (Portugal)
- The Pied Piper, directed by Irving Pichel, starring Monty Woolley, Roddy McDowall and Anne Baxter
- Pittsburgh, directed by Lewis Seiler, starring Marlene Dietrich, Randolph Scott and John Wayne
- The Pride of the Yankees, directed by Sam Wood, starring Gary Cooper, Teresa Wright, Babe Ruth and Walter Brennan

=== R ===
- Random Harvest, directed by Mervyn LeRoy, starring Ronald Colman and Greer Garson
- Reap the Wild Wind, director by Cecil B. DeMille, starring John Wayne, Ray Milland and Paulette Goddard
- Reunion in France, directed by Jules Dassin, starring Joan Crawford and John Wayne
- Ride 'Em Cowboy, directed by Arthur Lubin, starring Abbott and Costello
- Rings on Her Fingers, directed by Rouben Mamoulian, starring Henry Fonda and Gene Tierney
- Rio Rita, directed by S. Sylvan Simon, starring Abbott and Costello
- Road to Morocco, directed by David Butler, starring Bing Crosby, Bob Hope and Dorothy Lamour
- Roxie Hart, directed by William A. Wellman, starring Ginger Rogers, Adolphe Menjou and George Montgomery

=== S ===
- Saboteur, directed by Alfred Hitchcock, starring Priscilla Lane and Robert Cummings
- Saludos Amigos, Disney Classic animated film directed by Norm Ferguson, featuring Donald Duck and Goofy
- Sherlock Holmes and the Secret Weapon, directed by Roy William Neill, starring Basil Rathbone, Nigel Bruce and Lionel Atwill
- Sherlock Holmes and the Voice of Terror, directed by John Rawlins, starring Basil Rathbone and Nigel Bruce
- Somewhere I'll Find You, directed by Wesley Ruggles, starring Clark Gable and Lana Turner
- Son of Fury: The Story of Benjamin Blake, directed by John Cromwell, starring Tyrone Power and Gene Tierney
- The Spoilers, directed by Ray Enright, starring Marlene Dietrich, Randolph Scott and John Wayne
- Springtime in the Rockies, directed by Irving Cummings, starring Betty Grable, John Payne, Carmen Miranda, Cesar Romero and Harry James
- Star Spangled Rhythm, directed by George Marshall, featuring an ensemble cast

=== T ===
- Tales of Manhattan, directed by Julien Duvivier, featuring an ensemble cast
- The Talk of the Town, directed by George Stevens, starring Cary Grant, Jean Arthur and Ronald Colman
- Tarzan's New York Adventure, directed by Richard Thorpe, starring Johnny Weissmuller and Maureen O'Sullivan
- Tennessee Johnson, directed by William Dieterle, starring Van Heflin, Lionel Barrymore and Ruth Hussey
- There Was a Father (Chichi Ariki), directed by Yasujirō Ozu, starring Chishū Ryū – (Japan)
- This Above All, directed by Anatole Litvak, starring Tyrone Power and Joan Fontaine
- This Gun for Hire, directed by Frank Tuttle, starring Veronica Lake, Robert Preston and Alan Ladd
- Thunder Rock, directed by Roy Boulting, starring Michael Redgrave, Barbara Mullen and James Mason – (GB)
- To Be or Not to Be, directed by Ernst Lubitsch, starring Carole Lombard and Jack Benny
- Tortilla Flat, directed by Victor Fleming, starring Spencer Tracy, Hedy Lamarr, John Garfield and Frank Morgan

=== W ===
- Wake Island, directed by John Farrow, starring Brian Donlevy and Robert Preston
- Went the Day Well?, directed by Cavalcanti, starring Leslie Banks and Mervyn Johns – (GB)
- Who Done It?, directed by Erle C. Kenton, starring Abbott and Costello
- Woman of the Year, directed by George Stevens, starring Spencer Tracy and Katharine Hepburn

=== Y ===
- Yankee Doodle Dandy, directed by Michael Curtiz, starring James Cagney, Joan Leslie and Walter Huston
- You Were Never Lovelier, directed by William A. Seiter, starring Fred Astaire, Rita Hayworth, Adolphe Menjou and Xavier Cugat

== 1942 film releases ==
U.S.A. unless stated

=== January–March ===
- January 1942
  - 1 January
    - The Man Who Came to Dinner
  - 6 January
    - Blue, White and Perfect
  - 8 January
    - The Black Sheep of Whitehall (GB)
  - 10 January
    - All Through the Night
  - 19 January
    - The Big Blockade
  - 22 January
    - Babes on Broadway
  - 23 January
    - O Pátio das Cantigas (Portugal)
  - 24 January
    - The Fleet's In
  - 29 January
    - Son of Fury: The Story of Benjamin Blake
- February 1942
  - 2 February
    - Kings Row
  - 6 February
    - Valley of the Sun
  - 16 February
    - The Man Who Wanted to Kill Himself (Spain)
  - 19 February
    - To Be or Not to Be
    - Woman of the Year
  - 20 February
    - Ride 'Em Cowboy
    - Roxie Hart
  - 21 February
    - Captains of the Clouds
- March 1942
  - 3 March
    - The Great King (Germany)
  - 7 March
    - Bullet Scars
  - 10 March
    - Un Garibaldino al Convento (Italy)
  - 11 March
    - Rio Rita
  - 13 March
    - The Ghost of Frankenstein
    - Song of the Islands
  - 18 March
    - Reap the Wild Wind
  - 20 March
    - Rings on Her Fingers
  - 21 March
    - This Was Paris (GB)
  - 27 March
    - The Affairs of Jimmy Valentine

=== April–June ===
- April 1942
  - 1 April
    - There Was a Father (Japan)
  - 2 April
    - Alias Boston Blackie
    - My Favorite Blonde
  - 3 April
    - Jungle Book
  - 4 April
    - The Male Animal
  - 19 April
    - Hatter's Castle (GB)
  - 22 April
    - Saboteur
  - 24 April
    - Larceny, Inc.
  - 29 April
    - The Great Man's Lady
  - 30 April
    - My Gal Sal
- May 1942
  - 8 May
    - The Corpse Vanishes
    - In This Our Life
    - The Spoilers
  - 12 May
    - This Above All
  - 13 May
    - This Gun for Hire
  - 21 May
    - Pacific Rendezvous
    - Tortilla Flat
  - 22 May
    - Syncopation
  - 29 May
    - The Falcon Takes Over
    - Miss Annie Rooney
    - Yankee Doodle Dandy
  - 31 May
    - In Old California
- June 1942
  - 13 June
    - The Big Shot
    - Flying Fortress (GB)
    - Tombstone, the Town Too Tough to Die
  - 15 June
    - The Next of Kin (GB)
  - 16 June
    - Eagle Squadron
  - 22 June
    - The Foreman Went to France(GB)
  - 26 June
    - Ten Gentlemen from West Point
    - There's One Born Every Minute
  - 27 June
    - One of Our Aircraft is Missing

=== July–September ===
- July 1942
  - 2 July
    - Sons of the Pioneers
  - 8 July
    - The Murderer Lives at Number 21 (France)
  - 9 July
    - I Married an Angel
  - 10 July
    - The Magnificent Ambersons
  - 16 July
    - Her Cardboard Lover
  - 22 July
    - Mrs. Miniver
  - 29 July
    - The Kids Grow Up (Argentina)
  - 31 July
    - Invisible Agent
- August 1942
  - 4 August
    - Holiday Inn
  - 5 August
    - Tales of Manhattan
  - 7 August
    - A-Haunting We Will Go
    - Pardon My Sarong
  - 10 August
    - Alibi (GB)
  - 18 August
    - The Pride of the Yankees
  - 20 August
    - The Talk of the Town
  - 21 August
    - Bambi
    - The Pied Piper
  - 24 August
    - Uncensored (GB)
  - 25 August
    - Attack on Baku (Germany)
  - 28 August
    - The Loves of Edgar Allan Poe
  - 31 August
    - A Pistol Shot
- September 1942
  - 1 September
    - Wake Island
  - 4 September
    - Across the Pacific
    - The Big Street
  - 14 September
    - The First of the Few (GB)
  - 15 September
    - Ala-Arriba! (Portugal)
  - 16 September
    - The Major and the Minor
  - 17 September
    - In Which We Serve (GB)
  - 18 September
    - Kokoda Front Line! (Australia)
    - Sherlock Holmes and the Voice of Terror
  - 21 September
    - The Young Mr. Pitt (GB)
  - 25 September
    - Desperate Journey

=== October–December ===
- October 1942
  - 1 October
    - Somewhere I'll Find You
  - 8 October
    - Flying Tigers
    - A Yank at Eton
  - 16 October
    - Eyes in the Night
  - 21 October
    - For Me and My Gal
  - 23 October
    - The Glass Key
    - The Mummy's Tomb
  - 24 October
    - Northwest Rangers
  - 30 October
    - I Married a Witch
  - 31 October
    - Now, Voyager
- November 1942
  - 6 November
    - Springtime in the Rockies
    - Who Done It?
  - 9 November
    - The Great Mr. Handel (GB)
  - 10 November
    - Road to Morocco
  - 19 November
    - You Were Never Lovelier
  - 20 November
    - The Gaucho War (Argentina)
    - 'Neath Brooklyn Bridge
  - 25 November
    - Gentleman Jim
  - 27 November
    - The Undying Monster
  - 28 November
    - George Washington Slept Here
- December 1942
  - 4 December
    - The Black Swan
    - Thunder Rock (GB)
  - 5 December
    - Whom the Gods Love (Germany-Austria)
  - 6 December
    - Cat People
  - 7 December
    - Went the Day Well? (GB)
  - 9 December
    - Johnny Eager
  - 11 December
    - American Empire
    - Pittsburgh
  - 17 December
    - Random Harvest
  - 18 December
    - Aniki-Bóbó (Portugal)
    - The Great Impersonation
  - 23 December
    - Four Steps in the Clouds (Italy)
  - 24 December
    - Time to Kill
  - 25 December
    - Arabian Nights
    - Reunion in France
  - 30 December
    - Commandos Strike at Dawn

== Serials ==
- Captain Midnight, starring Dave O'Brien, directed by James W. Horne
- Don Winslow of the Navy
- Gang Busters
- Junior G-Men of the Air, starring the Dead End Kids
- King of the Mounties, starring Allan Lane, directed by William Witney
- Overland Mail
- Perils of Nyoka, starring Kay Aldridge & Clayton Moore, directed by William Witney
- Perils of the Royal Mounted, directed by James W. Horne
- The Secret Code, directed by Spencer Gordon Bennet
- Spy Smasher, starring Kane Richmond, directed by William Witney
- The Valley of Vanishing Men, directed by Spencer Gordon Bennet

== Short film series ==
- Laurel and Hardy (1921–1943)
- Our Gang (1922–1944)
- The Three Stooges (1934–1959)

== Animated short film series ==
- Mickey Mouse (1928–1953)
- Looney Tunes (1930–1969)
- Terrytoons (1930–1964)
- Merrie Melodies (1931–1969)
- Popeye (1933–1957)
- Color Rhapsodies (1934–1949)
- Donald Duck (1937–1956)
- Pluto (1937–1951)
- Walter Lantz Cartune (also known as New Universal Cartoons or Cartune Comedies) (1938-1942)
- Goofy (1939–1955)
- Andy Panda (1939–1949)
- Tom and Jerry (1940–1958)
- Woody Woodpecker (1941–1949)
- Swing Symphonies (1941–1945)
- The Fox and the Crow (1941–1950)

== Births ==
- January 3 – John Thaw, English actor (d. 2002)
- January 7 - Danny Steinmann, American director (d. 2012)
- January 8 – Yvette Mimieux, American actress (d. 2022)
- January 10 – Walter Hill, American director, producer and screenwriter
- January 11 - Joel Zwick, American director
- January 16 - Bradford English, American character actor (d. 2024)
- January 17 - Nancy Parsons, American actress (d. 2001)
- January 19
  - Michael Crawford, English actor and singer
  - Raynor Scheine, American actor
- January 21 - Michael G. Wilson, American-British screenwriter and producer
- January 27 - John Witherspoon, American actor and comedian (d. 2019)
- January 29
  - Ismael 'East' Carlo, Puerto Rican actor
  - Claudine Longet, Franco-American actress and singer
- January 31 – Daniela Bianchi, Italian actress
- February 1
  - Bibi Besch, Austrian-American actress (d. 1996)
  - Terry Jones, Welsh comedic actor, director and screenwriter (d. 2020)
- February 8 – Robert Klein, American actor and comedian
- February 9
  - Marianna Hill, American actress
  - Ada Lundver, Estonian actress and singer (d. 2011)
- February 11 - Marcia Jean Kurtz, American actress and director
- February 13 - Carol Lynley, American actress, child model (died 2019)
- February 14 - Andrew Robinson, American character actor
- February 21 –
  - Margarethe von Trotta, German director
  - Oliver Wood, British cinematographer (died 2023)
- February 24 - Jenny O'Hara, American actress
- March 1 - Dennis Lipscomb, American actor (died 2014)
- March 2 - Jon Finch, English actor (died 2012)
- March 9 - Ralph Peduto, American actor, playwright, writer and director (died 2014)
- March 15 - Molly Peters, English actress and model (died 2017)
- March 20 - Mews Small, American actress and singer
- March 25
  - Aretha Franklin, American singer, songwriter and pianist (died 2018)
  - Richard O'Brien, English actor and writer
- March 27
  - Art Evans, American actor (d. 2024)
  - Michael York, British actor
- March 28 – Mike Newell, English director and producer
- March 30 - Kenneth Welsh, Canadian actor (died 2022)
- April 2 - Roshan Seth, British-Indian actor, writer and director
- April 3
  - Marsha Mason, American actress
  - Wayne Newton, American singer and actor
- April 6
  - Barry Levinson, American director, producer and screenwriter
  - Anita Pallenberg, Italian-German actress (d. 2017)
- April 11 - Matthew Walker, English-Canadian actor
- April 17 - David Bradley, English actor
- April 21 - Rod Loomis, American actor
- April 23 – Sandra Dee, American actress (d. 2005)
- April 24 – Barbra Streisand, American actress, singer, director and producer
- April 26 - Mike Genovese, American actor
- April 27 - John Shrapnel, English actor (d. 2020)
- May 5 - Marc Alaimo, American actor
- May 11 - Terry McGovern, American actor and broadcaster
- May 17 - Al White, American character actor
- May 19 - Flemming Quist Møller, Danish director, cartoonist, screenwriter and actor (d. 2022)
- May 23
  - Alex Henteloff, American actor
  - Beth Porter, American actress and writer (d. 2023)
- May 28 - Božidara Turzonovová, Bulgarian-Slovak actress
- May 29 - Kevin Conway, American actor and director (d. 2020)
- June 5 - Hernán Romero, Peruvian actor (d. 2025)
- June 7 - Elizabeth Counsell, English actress
- June 18
  - Roger Ebert, American film critic (d. 2013)
  - Paul McCartney, English musician and composer (The Beatles)
  - Nick Tate, Australian actor
- June 20 - Chelcie Ross, American character actor
- June 24 - Michele Lee, American actress, singer, producer and director
- June 29 - Tony Vogel, English actor (d. 2015)
- June 30
  - Terry David Mulligan, Canadian actor
  - Friedrich von Thun, Austrian actor
- July 1 – Geneviève Bujold, Canadian actress
- July 9 – Richard Roundtree, American actor (d. 2023)
- July 10 - Tam White, Scottish musician and actor (d. 2010)
- July 13 – Harrison Ford, American actor and producer
- July 22 - Anthony James, American character actor (d. 2020)
- July 23 - Allen Danziger, American former actor
- July 24 – Chris Sarandon, American actor
- July 27 - Lanny Flaherty, American actor (d. 2024)
- July 29 - Tony Sirico, American actor (d. 2022)
- July 31 - Chela Matthison, Canadian-British actress
- August 1 - Giancarlo Giannini, Italian actor, director and screenwriter
- August 4 - Don S. Davis, American character actor (d. 2008)
- August 7 – Tobin Bell, actor
- August 18 - Lauro António, Portuguese director (d. 2022)
- August 19 - Fred Thompson, American politician, attorney, actor and radio personality (d. 2015)
- August 20 - Isaac Hayes, American singer and actor (d. 2008)
- August 28 - Peter Bartlett, American actor and voice actor
- August 29 - Gottfried John, German actor (d. 2014)
- September 5 - Werner Herzog, German director, screenwriter and actor
- September 6 - Carol Wayne, American actress (d. 1985)
- September 11 - Patricia Franklin, English actress
- September 17 - Lupe Ontiveros, American actress (d. 2012)
- September 19 - Victor Brandt, American actor
- September 20 - R. J. Adams, Canadian-American actor, screenwriter and producer
- September 24 - Kenneth Tigar, American actor
- September 25
  - Robert Miano, American actor
  - Robyn Nevin, Australian actress and director
- September 26 - Kent McCord, American actor
- September 28 - Marshall Bell, American character actor
- September 29
  - Yves Rénier, French actor, voice actor and filmmaker (d. 2021)
  - Madeline Kahn, American actress (d. 1999)
  - Ian McShane, English actor
- October 3 - Steve Susskind, American actor (d. 2005)
- October 4 – Christopher Stone, American actor (d. 1995)
- October 6 – Britt Ekland, Swedish actress
- October 7 - Melinda O. Fee, American actress (d. 2020)
- October 11 – Amitabh Bachchan, Indian actor
- October 13 – Suzzanna, Indonesian actress (d. 2008)
- October 14 - Roberto Della Casa, Italian actor
- October 20
  - Robert Costanzo, American actor
  - Earl Hindman, American actor (d. 2003)
- October 22 – Annette Funicello, American actress and singer (d. 2013)
- October 25 - Orso Maria Guerrini, Italian actor
- October 26
  - Bob Hoskins, English actor and director (d. 2014)
  - Eili Sild, Estonian actress (d. 2026)
- October 28 - Terence Donovan, English-Australian actor (d. 2026)
- October 30 - Larry Block, American actor (d. 2012)
- October 31 – David Ogden Stiers, American actor (d. 2018)
- November 1
  - Marcia Wallace, American actress and comedian (d. 2013)
  - Michael Zaslow, American actor (d. 1998)
- November 11 - Nancy Linehan Charles, American character actress
- November 12 - David Gant, Scottish actor
- November 15 – Hans Kaldoja, Estonian actor (d. 2017)
- November 17 – Martin Scorsese, American director, producer, screenwriter and actor
- November 18 - Susan Sullivan, American actress
- November 20 - Bob Einstein, American actor, comedy writer and producer (d. 2019)
- November 21
  - Michael Cavanaugh, American actor
  - Al Matthews, American actor and singer (d. 2018)
- November 24 – Billy Connolly, Scottish comedian and actor
- November 25 – Rosa von Praunheim, German filmmaker and pioneer of queer cinema (d. 2025)
- November 30 - Chuck Shamata, Canadian actor
- December 3 - Lynn Farleigh, English actress
- December 4 – Gemma Jones, English actress
- December 12 - Fatma Girik, Turkish actress (d. 2022)
- December 14 - Juan Diego, Spanish actor (d. 2022)
- December 23 - Brian McConnachie, American actor, comedian and writer
- December 27 - Charmian Carr, American actress and singer (d. 2016)
- December 30 - Fred Ward, American actor and producer (d. 2022)

== Deaths ==
- January 16 – Carole Lombard, 33, American actress, To Be or Not to Be, My Man Godfrey, Made for Each Other, Nothing Sacred
- January 31 – Rolf Wenkhaus, 24, German actor, Emil and the Detectives, S.A.-Mann Brand
- April 10 – Carl Schenstrøm, 60, Danish actor, Cocktails, The Last Laugh
- May 19 – Hale Hamilton, 62, American actor, writer, director, The Great Lover, Love Affair, Parole Girl, The Girl from Missouri
- May 29 – John Barrymore, 60, American actor, Grand Hotel, Twentieth Century, Dr. Jekyll and Mr. Hyde, Dinner at Eight
- June 4 – Virginia Lee Corbin, 31, American actress, Hands Up!, X Marks the Spot
- July 5 – Karin Swanström, 69, Swedish actress, director, His English Wife, Black Roses
- August 12 – Phillips Holmes, 35, American actor, Night Court, Men Must Fight
- August 14 – Rafaela Ottiano, 54, Italian-born American actress, Grand Hotel, She Done Him Wrong, The Devil-Doll, Curly Top
- October 20 – May Robson, 84, Australian-born American stage & film actress, Bringing Up Baby, A Star is Born, Lady for a Day, The Adventures of Tom Sawyer
- October 22 – Olga Svendsen, 59, Danish actress, Kidnapped
- October 24 – James C. Morton, 58, American actor, Public Cowboy No. 1, Lucky Legs
- November 5 – George M. Cohan, 64, American actor, songwriter, entertainer, The Phantom President, Broadway Jones, subject of Yankee Doodle Dandy
- November 9 – Edna May Oliver, 59, American stage & film actress, David Copperfield, Drums Along the Mohawk, Little Women, A Tale of Two Cities
- November 12 – Laura Hope Crews, 62, American stage & screen actress, Gone with the Wind, Camille, Angel, The Blue Bird
- November 15 – Sidney Fox, 30, American actress, Murders in the Rue Morgue, Bad Sister, Six Cylinder Love
- December 12 – Helen Westley, 67, American stage & screen actress, Heidi, Roberta, All This, and Heaven Too, Alexander's Ragtime Band

== Film debuts ==
- Ernest Anderson – In This Our Life
- Richard Attenborough – In Which We Serve
- Victor Beaumont – The Next of Kin
- Ulrich Beiger – Kleine Residenz
- Liliane Bert – Patricia
- Anita Björk – The Heavenly Play
- Bourvil – Croisières sidérales
- Wally Cassell – Fingers at the Window
- André Charlot – The Falcon's Brother
- Jim Davis (actor) – Cairo
- Jeff Donnell – My Sister Eileen
- Valentine Dyall – The Missing Million
- Blake Edwards – Ten Gentlemen from West Point
- Dale Evans – Orchestra Wives
- Aldo Fabrizi – Before the Postman
- Gabriele Ferzetti – Street of the Five Moons
- Harry Fowler – Those Kids from Town
- Thomas Gomez – Sherlock Holmes and the Voice of Terror
- Walter Gotell – The Day Will Dawn
- Thora Hird – The Black Sheep of Whitehall
- Holger Höglund – Take Care of Ulla
- Arthur Hunnicutt – Wildcat
- Betty Hutton – The Fleet's In
- Gordon Jackson – The Foreman Went to France
- Anne Jeffreys – Billy the Kid Trapped
- Gene Kelly – For Me and My Gal
- Keiju Kobayashi – Fear of the Fifth Column
- Norman Lloyd – Saboteur
- Harry Locke – The Day Will Dawn
- Audrey Long – The Male Animal
- Teala Loring – The Fleet's In
- George Macready – Commandos Strike at Dawn
- Madhubala – Basant
- Richard Martin – Call Out the Marines
- Marilyn Maxwell – Stand by for Action
- Charles McGraw – The Undying Monster
- Stephen McNally – Grand Central Murder
- Kay Medford – Maisie Gets Her Man
- Ricardo Montalbán – The Three Musketeers
- Harry Morgan – To the Shores of Tripoli
- Barry Morse – The Goose Steps Out
- George N. Neise – They Raid by Night
- Eleanor Parker – The Big Shot
- Gisèle Pascal – L'Arlésienne
- Mala Powers – Tough as They Come
- Wolfgang Preiss – The Great Love
- Frances Rafferty – Fingers at the Window
- Grandon Rhodes – Ship Ahoy
- Janette Scott – Went the Day Well?
- Simone Signoret – Bolero
- William Smith – The Ghost of Frankenstein
- Robert Strauss – Native Land
- Elizabeth Taylor – There's One Born Every Minute
- Raf Vallone – We the Living
- John Williams (actor) – The Next of Kin
- Keenan Wynn – Somewhere I'll Find You
