= Milú =

Portuguese actor and singer

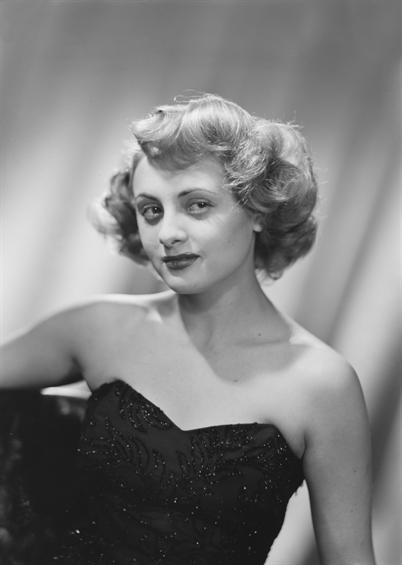
Milú, photographed by Silva Nogueira

Milú (Portuguese pronunciation: [ˈmi.lu]), stage name of Maria de Lourdes de Almeida Lemos (1926 – 2008) was a Portuguese actor and singer.

Maria de Lourdes de Almeida Lemos was born on 24 April 1926 in Lisbon, capital of Portugal. By the age of ten she was performing as a singer on the radio shows Rádio Graça and Rádio Sonora of the Portuguese national radio station Emissora Nacional de Radiodifusão. Her first stage and movie performances were at the age of twelve. On the stage she performed in children’s shows, while her first film role was in Aldeia da Roupas Branca, in which she performed with Beatriz Costa.

In 1943 Milú played a leading role in the Portuguese comedy film, O Costa do Castelo, directed by Arthur Duarte, and starring António Silva and Maria Matos. She would go on to star in several other films directed by Duarte. In the same year she married, with thousands of people turning up at the church to see her. She then announced that she was ceasing to perform, but she returned to the screen in 1946, after the marriage ended. In addition to Duarte, she worked with directors such as Manuel Guimarães, Constantino Esteves, Perdigão Queiroga, Armando de Miranda, and Ladislao Vajda. On the stage, she performed in Lisbon in vaudeville at the Teatro Avenida and Teatro Variedades.

In 1960, there was speculation that she would move to Hollywood. However, instead, she married for the second time, to Luís de Magalhães Coutinho Nobre Guedes. They lived in Brazil between 1960 and 1968 and had one daughter. She did little acting work during this time.

Her last film performance was in 1981 at the age of 55. In the later years of her life she lost her sight but she continued to sing, performing a duet with Patrícia Vasconcelos in 2007 that appeared in the latter’s album Se o Amor Fosse Só Isso.

Milú died on 5 November 2008, in Cascais, Portugal.
