= Amélia Rey Colaço =

20th-century Portuguese stage actor and impresario

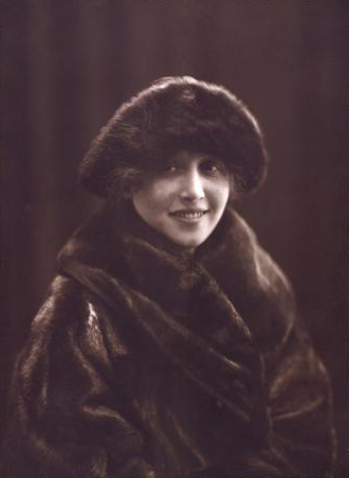
- Born: 2 March 1898; Lisbon, Portugal
- Died: 8 July 1990 (aged 92); Lisbon
- Occupation: actor
- Years active: 70
- Known for: Lisbon theatre
- Spouse: Felisberto Robles Monteiro

Amélia Lafourcade Schmidt Rey Colaço de Robles Monteiro (2 March 1898–8 July 1990) was one of the leading Portuguese actors of the first half of the 20th century. She was also an important impresario.

== Early years ==
Amélia Rey Colaço was born on 2 March 1898 in Lisbon, Portugal, the youngest of four sisters. She came from a privileged, artistic and multinational background. Her father, Alexandre Rey Colaço, born in Tangier in 1854, had a Portuguese mother and a French father. Orphaned at a young age, his training as a pianist started at the Madrid Royal Conservatory and was continued in Paris and Berlin, as a result of the patronage of the Count of Daupiás. As a pianist and composer, he became music teacher to Prince Luís Filipe of Portugal and his brother, the future King Manuel II. Amélia Rey Colaço’s mother, Alice Lafourcade Schmidt, was born in Chile, had a French mother and a German father and taught her daughters several languages. She grew up in Berlin with her mother and stepfather, a musical instrument dealer. Schmidt’s mother became known in Berlin for organizing a salon where she gathered promising figures from the artistic world. It was at this salon that Schmidt met Alexandre Rey Colaço.

In December 1911, Amélia Rey Colaço visited Berlin with her sister, Maria, with the aim of studying music. Here, she also found a stimulating environment at her grandmother's salon. She also had the opportunity to attend shows directed by Max Reinhardt at the Deutsches Theater, and it is said that this attracted her to acting. On her return to Portugal she started to take acting lessons with the actor, Augusto Rosa, with whom her father was good friends. In 1915, she and her sisters went to Madrid where they recited before King Alfonso XIII and his court. This familiarised her with performing in public at the highest level.

== Acting debut and early career ==
Following a recommendation by Augusto Rosa, Rey Colaço’s acting debut occurred in 1917 at the then Teatro República (now Teatro São Luiz) in Lisbon, in the play Marinela by the Spanish author and playwright, Benito Pérez Galdós. To play the character, a young vagabond, she practised for months walking barefoot and wearing rags, inside the garden of her family home. On stage with two of Portugal’s best-known actors, Palmira Bastos and Adelina Abranches, her performance received widespread enthusiasm in most of the Lisbon press. She stayed at the Teatro São Luiz until 1919, refusing invitations to join Spanish companies. She was then hired for the summer season of the D. Maria II National Theatre. In 1920 she married the actor and director, Felisberto Robles Monteiro. They founded their own theatre company, known as the Companhia Rey Colaço-Robles Monteiro. This company was to last 53 years, mainly playing in the National Theatre, for which the company won the concession in 1929. In addition to performances in Lisbon the company also toured to other parts of the country, including its islands.

== Rey Colaço-Robles Monteiro theatre company ==
The new theatre company’s first play was Zilda by the playwright Alfredo Cortez. Zilda, played by Rey Colaço, is a girl who prostitutes herself to move up in life. She has been said to have embodied the first modern character in Portuguese theatre. Rey Colaço organized an ambitious repertoire, in spite of censorship applied by the Estado Novo government. The company was noted for its scenography: she called on famous artists to help design the scenery, including the architect Raul Lino, the artist and choreographer, José de Almada Negreiros, and the painter Eduardo Malta. As actors, her company hired some of the most famous names of the time in Portugal, such as Palmira Bastos, Laura Alves, and Vasco Santana. She introduced an entire new generation of actors and directors who were trained by the company, such as João Villaret, Maria Barroso, Ruy de Carvalho and Filipe La Féria.

With the company’s repertoire alternating between classical and modern works, she opened the doors to Portuguese dramatists, presenting works by José Régio and Bernardo Santareno, among others. At the same time she introduced foreign playwrights to the Portuguese audience, such as Jean Cocteau, Jean Anouilh, Federico García Lorca, Ramón del Valle-Inclán, Eugene O'Neill, Tennessee Williams, Arthur Miller, Pirandello, Max Frisch, Ionesco, and Edward Albee. Her task was greatly hampered by state censorship, which constantly prevented new projects and interrupted presentations. The company's wide repertoire was almost entirely due to Rey Colaco’s persistence and great diplomatic capacity, but not even she could persuade the censors to let the company play Luís de Sttau Monteiro or Berthold Brecht.

The death of her husband in 1958 was a severe blow to Rey Colaço, both personally and professionally. She assumed the company’s administrative responsibilities hitherto performed by her husband and began to share the direction of the company with her daughter, Mariana. Her work as an actress took second place and the economic difficulties experienced by the company, a consequence of the complicated contractual conditions imposed by the National Theatre, led to several requests for government subsidies. The company's situation was dramatically affected by a fire that broke out at the National Theater on December 2, 1964, during a performance of Macbeth. Its entire assets, including sets, costumes and props that had been accumulated over 43 years were destroyed. Despite this, Rey Colaço tried to continue, leasing the Teatro Avenida where she presented Miguel Franco's O Mutim. The premiere was attended by the President of the Republic and, afterwards, the play was immediately banned even though it had been cleared by the censors. It was only realised three days after the premiere that interrogation scenes could be related to the practices of the dictatorship. Given this, it was perhaps ironic that she was accused of serving the regime.

Once again, she tried to rebuild but then in 1967 the Teatro Avenida also burnt down. She rented another theatre and made her last appearance as an actress in 1973. In early 1974, her company returned to Teatro São Luiz, where she had started. On 25 April 1974 the Carnation Revolution took place, which ended the rule of the authoritarian Estado Novo. In view of the criticisms made that she served the regime, she suspended the company.

== Television ==
She reappeared in 1982 in a television series entitled Gente fina é outra coisa. Later, she dedicated herself to helping the National Theatre Museum improve its exhibitions. Her last television role was at the age of 87. Amélia Rey Colaço died on July 8, 1990, in Lisbon.
