= Cine-Teatro Monumental, Lisbon =

Defunct theatre in Lisbon, Portugal

Cine-Teatro Monumental
- Interactive map of Cine-Teatro Monumental
- Address: Praça Duque de Saldanha; Lisbon; Portugal
- Coordinates: 38°44′00″N 09°08′44″W
- Capacity: Theatre 1086; cinema 1967

Construction
- Opened: 8 November 1951
- Closed: 1984
- Architect: Raúl Rodrigues Lima

The Cine-Teatro Monumental was a large theatre and cinema in Lisbon, capital of Portugal. It opened in 1951 and closed in 1984.

The Cine-Teatro Monumental was designed by the architect Raúl Rodrigues Lima (1909-1980) and was situated at the Praça Duque de Saldanha in Lisbon. It followed the modernist style appreciated by the authoritarian Estado Novo government of the time and contained a cinema and a theatre. The building was commissioned in 1943 by the Minister of National Education, Mário de Figueiredo, and construction was approved in 1946. The structure was covered with stone and ornamented on one of its corners with a large column, topped by an armillary sphere (a symbol much-loved by the Estado Novo). The main public entrance, facing Praça Duque de Saldanha, had seven arched doors with direct access to the ticket offices. Internal decoration included chandeliers, paintings by Maria Keil and sculptures by Euclides Vaz.

The complex was leased by the businessman and impresario Vasco Morgado with the intention of presenting theatrical performances, operettas, and variety shows of the type that could attract audiences large enough to fill the theatre. In the 1970s, an additional small cinema room was added to the top floor, to provide an alternative space to the large cinema. In the 1970s it became increasingly difficult to attract profitable audiences for a theatre with 1086 seats and a cinema with 1967 seats and in 1982 it was decided that the complex should be demolished. Despite public protest this was done in 1984 and a shopping centre and cinema replaced it. In turn, that cinema, with the largest of its four projection rooms containing 378 seats, was forced to close in 2019 because it proved uneconomic, and works were under way to restructure the site in 2020.

The original cinema opened with Jacques Tourneur's film The Flame and the Arrow. The first theatrical performance, on 8 November 1951, was the operetta As três valsas (The three waltzes), starring Laura Alves and João Villaret. This was followed by a variety show featuring performances by Laura Alves, João Villaret and Eugénio Salvador, among others. Laura Alves, who was married to Vasco Morgado until 1967 and continued to collaborate with him after the marriage ended, was a popular, regular performer at the Monumental and was said to have been heartbroken when it was demolished. The theatre was not just used for plays and shows that were expected to run for some time: it became a major venue for leading foreign performers, such as the singers Charles Aznavour, Sylvie Vartan and Rita Pavone.

== See also ==
- List of theatres and auditoriums in Lisbon
