= Óscar de Lemos =

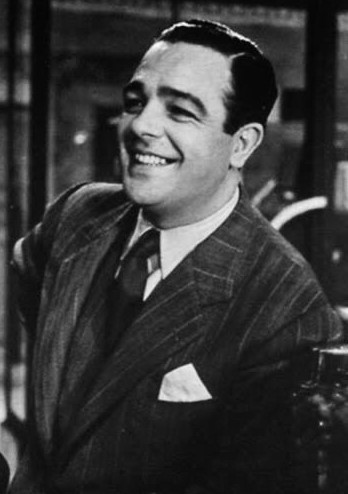
- Born: 1906; Viana do Castelo, Portugal
- Died: 1954 (aged 47–48)
- Occupation: Actor
- Years active: 1938-1946 (film)

Óscar de Lemos (17 September 1906 – 1954) was a Portuguese stage and film actor known for his roles in several Portuguese films of the 1930s and 1940s.

Born in Viana do Castelo, Óscar de Lemos moved to Porto at the age of ten to live with his uncle and aunt while pursuing his studies. During his early years, he showed little interest in cinema, falling asleep during his first visit to the movies.

In his twenties, Lemos married and relocated to Lisbon, where he worked in various professions, including as a salesman, perfumer, and insurance collector. Around this time, he began playing the harmonica and joined the Aldrabófona, a private orchestra affiliated with the Trafaria Geography Society. This would ultimately lead to his career in film.

In 1938, Lemos was recommended to director Jorge Brum do Canto, who cast him as Caçarola in the movie A Canção da Terra. This marked the beginning of his acting career, during which he took on roles such as a bumpkin in Aldeia da Roupa Branca, a soldier in João Ratão, and a fisherman in Porto de Abrigo.

Outside of his professional life, Óscar de Lemos described himself as superstitious nature and noted his fondness for large breakfasts, often consisting of soup, two main dishes, fruit, bread, and wine.

== Selected filmography ==
- A Canção da Terra (1938)
- Aldeia da Roupa Branca (1938)
- João Ratão (1940)
- Porto de Abrigo (1941)
- A Menina da Rádio (1944)
- Gentleman Thief (1946)

== Bibliography ==
- Patricia Vieira. Portuguese Film, 1930-1960,: The Staging of the New State Regime. A&C Black, 2013.
