= José de Matos-Cruz =

Portuguese cinema writer

- Born: 9 February 1947 (age 79); Mortágua, Portugal
- Occupations: Writer, journalist

José de Matos-Cruz (born 9 February 1947) is a Portuguese writer, journalist, editor, high-school teacher, investigator, and encyclopedist. From 1980 to 2010, he worked at the Cinemateca Portuguesa (Portuguese Film Archive) in Lisbon. He is a prominent historian of the Portuguese cinema.

== Biography ==
José de Matos-Cruz is a licentiate in law by the University of Coimbra, 1973.

Since the 1960s, he has written for various newspapers and magazines. He writes fiction and poetry books, some worth mentioning: Tempo Possível (Possible Times), in 1967, Cafre (Kaffir), 1970, Alma de Cadáver (Soul of a Corpse), 1985, A Erosão dos Lábios (Lips Erosion), 1992, Hexálogo (Hexalog), 2000, Os EntreTantos (Meantimes), 2003, and O Infante Portugal (The Prince Heir of Portugal ), 2007. He is the founder of several comics magazines and the coordinator of a comics section entitled Quadradinhos (Comic Strips) in the evening paper A Capital. In 2004, he started publishing a periodical webzine, Imaginário (Imagery).

He also writes books on cinema, such as monographs on Charles Chaplin (1981), Manoel de Oliveira (1996), António de Macedo (2000), Artur Ramos (2003), António Lopes Ribeiro and Francisco Ribeiro (2008). His masterpieces include O Cais do Olhar (The Quay of Sight), 1980–1999, which covers all 20th-century Portuguese long feature films; in 1989 a Prontuário do Cinema Português, a guide with detailed descriptions of Portuguese films produced from 1896 to 1989; O Cinema Português (Portuguese Cinema), a catalog of Portuguese films from 1986 to 1998 (1998); and in 2002, 30 Anos com o Cinema Português (30 Years of Portuguese Cinema).

Since 1986, he has reviewed films for the newspaper Diário de Notícias. In 1995, he was an adviser for the series (Portuguese Film History), broadcast by the RTP, the Portuguese national TV station. He has also advised on dictionaries, encyclopaedias and several RTP programs (1989–94) and productions (1989–99).

From 2000 to 2010, he was a professor at the Escola Superior de Teatro e de Cinema. He created a film database called Cinema Português (2002–09), published by the Instituto Camões, a department of the Portuguese Foreign Office. In 2003, he started teaching a film course at the Universidade Moderna, Lisbon. From 1980 to 2008, he organised Filmografia Portuguesa (a systematic list of Portuguese films and their features) at the Cinemateca Portuguesa, the Portuguese National Film Archive.

José de Matos-Cruz – Memórias Afectivas e Outras Histórias (José de Matos-Cruz, affective memories and other stories) is a DVD film by Delfim Ramos, which portrays him as a living and creative testimony. In 2005, he published a monograph of the actor Joaquim de Almeida (Joaquim de Almeida – 1838–1921 – Um Actor de Montijo), which is expected to become in future a digital guide to Portuguese Theatre, the Anuário Teatral – Portugal – Século XIX, (a work still in progress). In 2010, he became a member of the board of the Fundação D. Luís I, in the town of Cascais.

== See also ==
- Cinema of Portugal
