= João Villaret =

Portuguese actor

João Villaret OSE
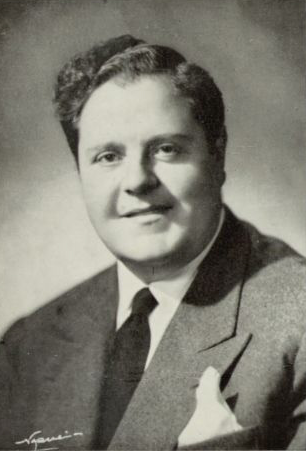
- Born: João Henrique Pereira Villaret; 10 May 1913
- Died: 21 January 1961 (aged 47)

João Henrique Pereira Villaret OSE (born 10 May 1913 in Lisbon; died 21 January 1961) was a Portuguese actor.

== Filmography ==
- O Pai Tirano, by António Lopes Ribeiro (1941)
- Inês de Castro, by Leitão de Barros (1945)
- Camões, by Leitão de Barros (1946)
- Three Mirrors, by Ladislao Vadja (1947)
- Frei Luís de Sousa, by António Lopes Ribeiro (1950)
- A Garça e a Serpente, by Arthur Duarte (1952)
- O Primo Basílio, by António Lopes Ribeiro (1959).

== Distinctions ==
=== National orders ===
- Officer of the Order of Saint James of the Sword (2 April 1960)
