= Three Mirrors =

1943 film

- Directed by: Ladislao Vajda
- Written by: Natividad Zaro (play); Alfredo Echegaray; Armando Vieira Pinto
- Starring: Virgílio Teixeira; Paola Barbara; João Villaret
- Cinematography: Heinrich Gärtner
- Music by: Jesús García Leoz; Jaime Mendes
- Production companies: Lisboa Filme; Peninsular Films
- Release date: 1 October 1947
- Running time: 86 minutes
- Countries: Portugal; Spain
- Languages: Portuguese; Spanish

Three Mirrors (Portuguese: Três Espelhos, Spanish: Tres espejos) is a 1947 Portuguese-Spanish mystery drama film directed by Ladislao Vajda and starring Virgílio Teixeira, Paola Barbara and João Villaret.

== Synopsis ==
A businessman dies when his car crashes, but it turns out that he had already been stabbed. Inspector Moisés takes on the case and finds out that the various people who knew the dead man saw him in a different way.

== Cast ==
- Virgílio Teixeira as Miguel d'Aguiar
- Paola Barbara as Condessa
- João Villaret as Inspector Moisés
- António Silva as Médico
- Carmen Dolores as Maria Luisa
- Igrejas Caeiro as Ajudante de Moisés
- Madalena Sotto as Amable
- Luís de Campos as Agente
- Óscar Acúrcio as Agente Novato
- Rafael Durán as João Romano Esmoriz
- Raul de Carvalho as Banqueiro Santana
- Francisco Ribeiro as Ricardo
- Sales Ribeiro as António
- Maria Clara as Fadista

== Bibliography ==
- De Pina, Luís. História do cinema português. Publicações Europa-América, 1986.
