= Joao Ponces de Carvalho =

Portuguese film director

João de Deus Ramos Ponces de Carvalho
- Born: João de Deus Ramos Ponces de Carvalho; March 17, 1957 (age 68); Lisbon, Portugal
- Years active: 1979-presents

João de Deus Ramos Ponces de Carvalho (born 17 March 1957 in Lisbon) is a Portuguese film director.

His great-grandfather was the poet João de Deus. He went to the University of Lisbon, obtaining a License in History, specialty, Art History. He started taking still pictures when he was 10, and became a publicity photographer by 17. His first documentary film was made at 22, being one of the first TV programs to represent Portugal in MIPCOM, Cannes, 1980.
