= O Pátio das Cantigas =

- Directed by: Francisco Ribeiro
- Written by: António Lopes Ribeiro; Francisco Ribeiro; Vasco Santana
- Produced by: António Lopes Ribeiro
- Starring: António Vilar; Vasco Santana; António Silva; Maria das Neves; Francisco Ribeiro; Graça Maria; Maria da Graça; Laura Alves
- Production company: Produção António Lopes Ribeiro
- Distributed by: SPAC (Sociedade Portuguesa de Actualidades Cinematográficas)
- Release date: 23 January 1942
- Running time: 105 minutes
- Country: Portugal
- Language: Portuguese

O Pátio das Cantigas (English: The Courtyard of the Ballads) is a 1942 Portuguese comedy film directed by Francisco Ribeiro (better known as Ribeirinho), and produced by his brother António Lopes Ribeiro. A classic example of the comédia à portuguesa genre, the film is set in a typical Lisbon courtyard during the Marchas Populares festivities. It follows a close-knit community of neighbors through a series of romantic entanglements, misunderstandings, and moral lessons, offering a humorous and sentimental portrayal of traditional urban life.

The screenplay was written by António Lopes Ribeiro, Ribeirinho and Vasco Santana and the later two also star in the film alongside António Silva, Laura Alves, and Maria das Neves. O Pátio das Cantigas was Ribeirinho's only work as a film director. The film has been noted for its musical numbers and character-driven humor, and has also been interpreted by scholars as reflecting values associated with the Estado Novo regime.

Despite the film only being screened for four weeks upon release, it cemented itself in the Portuguese culture, due to extensive screenings on Portuguese television during the 1960s and 70s. This led to the popularization of characters and expressions, such as the teasing of António Silva "Evaristo, tens cá disto?".

A remake of O Pátio das Cantigas directed by Leonel Vieira was released in 2015. It became the most-watched Portuguese film of all time at the time, surpassing previous records with over 392,000 viewers and box office revenues exceeding 2 million euros. The remake featured a cast of well-known Portuguese actors and humorists and was part of a trilogy project celebrating classic Portuguese cinema. The director emphasized that the trilogy was intended as a homage to the original films while updating them for modern audiences.

== Plot ==
The story takes place in a Lisbon courtyard (pátio), during the Marchas Populares festivities. The film opens with a narrator who briefly introduces the main characters and their relationships, setting the tone for the interpersonal dynamics that unfold. Alfredo is a kind and reserved young man, contrasted with his impulsive and self-centered brother, Carlos Bonito, who is romantically involved with Amália, a flirtatious and superficial woman. Carlos is also shown to be pursuing a singing career and tries to convince various women to partner with him in a musical act. Suzana, the siblings’ thoughtful sister, is secretly in love with Alfredo.

Another central figure is Narciso, an aging alcoholic and street guitarist, who lives with his responsible son Rufino. Together, they run the local dairy. Narciso is romantically interested in Senhora Rosa, a recently widowed florist, who also attracts the attention of Evaristo, a vain and pompous man. The rivalry between Narciso and Evaristo reaches its height in a dance night at the courtyard that ends in a brawl. Rosa eventually agrees to marry Narciso, but only if he reforms and gives up drinking.

Tensions rise with the sudden return of Maria da Graça, a woman who had emigrated to Brazil. Around the same time, the elderly Senhor Heitor is assaulted and robbed of 15 contos. The event causes a stir in the neighborhood, and suspicion quickly falls on Carlos, especially after he tells Amália he suddenly has the money they needed. He is arrested and wrongfully imprisoned. It is later revealed that the money in Carlos’s possession had come from Evaristo, who had lent it to him to finance a planned tour in Brazil. The real thief is eventually caught by the police, who are depicted in the film as firm but just.

In the final scenes, many of the main characters find romantic resolution, including Rufino and Maria da Graça, leading Rufino to rename the courtyard dairy from “Estrela de Alva” to “Estrela Luso-Brasileira” in reference to Maria da Graça. The film ends with the community coming together in a celebratory spirit, singing and dancing during the neighborhood marches, as the once insular courtyard is opened up to a sense of collective joy and harmony.

== Cast ==
- Carlos Alves as Engenhocas
- Maria das Neves as Senhora Rosa
- António Vilar as Carlos Bonito
- Laura Alves as Celeste
- João Silva as Senhor Heitor
- Maria Paula as Amália
- Eliezer Kamenesky as Boris do Nove
- António Silva as Evaristo
- Barroso Lopes as João Magrinho
- Carlos Otero as Alfredo
- Graça Maria as Susana
- Vasco Santana as Narciso
- Ribeirinho as Rufino
- Regina Montenegro as Senhora Margarida
- Armando Machado as "Arnesto" Marques
- Pereira Saraiva as "Bicente" Marques
- Reginaldo Duarte as "Cebastião" Marques
- Casimiro Rodrigues as Um freguês (a customer)
- Artur Rodrigues as Artur Chóchinha
- Maria da Graça as Maria da Graça
- João Guerra as O Agente Fernando
- Joaquim Amarante as 2º Agente (the second agent)
- Armando Pedro as O Caixa (the cashier)

== Themes and ideological context ==
Several scholars have examined O Pátio das Cantigas in relation to its broader cultural and ideological implications, particularly regarding gender roles, emigration narratives, and the values promoted during Portugal’s Estado Novo regime. The film is seen both as a product of its time and as a vehicle for disseminating conservative ideals aligned with the regime’s vision of national identity. More broadly, it exemplifies how mid-20th-century Portuguese cinema served propagandistic functions.

The film celebrates community cohesion, moral redemption, and social harmony, while implicitly promoting values such as discipline, modesty, and deference to authority. The frequent positive depiction of rural or working-class characters and the romanticization of the Lisbon courtyard as a microcosm of national virtue support this reading. Scholars argue that these representations reinforced the Estado Novo’s idealized vision of Portuguese identity, often conveyed through subtle narrative and visual cues rather than overt political messaging.

In terms of gender representation, the female characters, particularly Amália, Suzana, and Maria da Graça, embody contrasting models of morality and behavior. Amália is portrayed as flirtatious and materialistic, Suzana as reserved and self-sacrificing, and Maria da Graça, an emigrant returning from Brazil, initially appears as an independent and successful woman but ultimately chooses to abandon her career abroad in favor of a traditional domestic role. This narrative arc reinforces a vision of womanhood rooted in humility, family, and national belonging, consistent with the patriarchal norms promoted by the Estado Novo.

The film also addresses themes of emigration and return. Maria da Graça’s character represents the idealized emigrant who, despite achieving material success abroad, chooses to return to Portugal and embrace a simpler, more “authentic” rural life. This portrayal aligns with the regime’s efforts to valorize the countryside and traditional ways of life, contrasting with the perceived moral and social risks of modern urban environments or foreign influences.
