= Teatro Laura Alves =

Theatre in Lisbon, Portugal

- Interactive map of Teatro Laura Alves
- Address: 253 Rua da Palma; Lisbon; Portugal
- Coordinates: 38°43′11″N 09°08′09″W

Construction
- Opened: As Cinema Rex, 1936; as Teatro Laura Alves, December 1968
- Closed: December 1987

The Teatro Laura Alves, was situated at 253 Rua da Palma in Lisbon. It opened on 29 December 1968 in a building that had previously been the Cinema Rex. The theatre closed in late 1987 and the building burnt down in 2012.

== History ==
The Cinema Rex, with 541 seats, opened in November 1936 in a building that had been purchased by the Portuguese Spiritist Federation in 1929. The Federation owned it until the end of 1953, when it was taken over by order of the dictatorial Estado Novo regime after the Federation had been banned. As well as functioning as a cinema, the building was a popular location for events, such as Carnival parties.

In January 1968 the cinema was closed and management was taken over by the impresario, Vasco Morgado, who named the building in honour of his wife, the actress Laura Alves. The first play performed at this theatre was a Portuguese version of Billy Liar by Keith Waterhouse and Willis Hall with Ruy de Carvalho, Brunilde Júdice, Jacinto Ramos, Manuela Maria and Laura Alves being the main actors. Proceedings began with a speech by Ramos from the stage followed by thanks from Morgado from the audience and by Alves from the stage.

The theatre was used for many plays, including revues, known as Teatro de Revista in Portugal. The popular actress Ivone Silva gave her last performance there in the play Cá Estão Eles (Here they are). Among its most notable shows was a production of Who's Afraid of Virginia Woolf? by Edward Albee, starring Jacinto Ramos and Glória de Matos.

The theatre closed in December 1987 in the year after the death of Alves, and the building was then used for commercial purposes. It burnt down on 26 May 2012, with the fire having started in a residential area. It was in a poor condition, had a bad reputation and was said to have been used at the time for prostitution.
