= Leonor Maia =

Portuguese actress

- Born: Maria da Conceição de Vasconcelos; 8 December 1926; Lourenço Marques, Mozambique
- Died: 3 April 2010 (aged 83)
- Occupation: Actress
- Years active: 1941–1953

Leonor Maia, pseudonym of Maria da Conceição de Vasconcelos (8 December 1926 – 3 April 2010) was a Portuguese film actress active in the 1940s, best remembered for her role in The Tyrant Father. She retired from film in 1953. She was born in Lourenço Marques, now known as Maputo.
