= António de Macedo =

Portuguese filmmaker, writer, university professor and lecturer

- Born: 5 July 1931; Lisbon, Portugal
- Died: 5 October 2017 (aged 86); Lisbon, Portugal
- Education: University of Lisbon; NOVA University of Lisbon
- Occupations: Film director, screenwriter, university teacher, writer
- Years active: 1961–2012

António de Macedo (5 July 1931 − 5 October 2017) was a Portuguese filmmaker, writer, university professor and lecturer.

He gave up filmmaking in the 1990s as he felt systematically excluded from the state support programs of the Portuguese Ministry of Culture, the only financial source for film production in Portugal in that time. As a consequence, he dedicated himself entirely to writing, investigation and teaching. He published several books, essays, philosophy and fiction.

== Biography ==
=== Filmmaker ===
Macedo was born in Lisbon, where he graduated in architecture at the ESBAL (Escola Superior de Belas-Artes), the Faculty of Fine Arts, in 1958. From then until 1964, he worked as an architect in the Town Hall of Lisbon.

He abandoned his architect career in 1964 to devote himself to filmmaking as director and scriptwriter. He also dedicated to literature and research in the fields of religion and spirituality. He specialized in the history and Sociology of Esoteric Christianity. In 2010 he earned a doctor's degree summa cum laude in Sociology of Culture (in the field of Sociology of Religion), at the Nova University of Lisbon.

As a filmmaker, he was one of the pioneers of the Portuguese Cinema Novo and one of the founder members of the first film cooperative societies in Portugal, the "Centro Português de Cinema" (1970).

He started his career as a film director with his avant-garde short film Verão Coincidente [Coincident Summer] and Nicotiana (1963). These films were noticed by the producers Francisco de Castro and António da Cunha Telles, who invited Macedo to direct his first feature film, Domingo à Tarde [Sunday Afternoon], 1965, which was selected for the Venice Film Festival of that year. During the prime minister António de Oliveira Salazar and later of Marcello Caetano dictatorship, Macedo's movies were almost always at odds with the Portuguese censorship, specially Domingo à Tarde [Sunday Afternoon] and A Promessa [The Vow], which were seriously affected by censors. Nojo aos Cães [Even Curs Feel Disgust] was totally forbidden. Nevertheless, A Promessa had a good reception at the Cannes Film Festival and it won the first prize at the Cartagena Film Festival. Nojo aos Cães was selected for the Bergamo Film Festival, had good reviews and a final nomination for the first prize as well. At the Benalmádena Film Festival it won the prestigious "FICC Award" (annual film prize of the "Fédération Internationale des Ciné-Clubs").

Just before the Carnation Revolution in 1974, Macedo founded in that same year, together with other filmmakers, a new cooperative film production company, Cinequanon. There he worked as a director until 1996. His latest film made with this new film company was Santo António de Todo o Mundo [Saint Anthony of the Whole World], shot in 1996.

After the fall of the dictatorial regime of Salazar / Caetano in 1974, Macedo worked intensively in many television films and TV series: films "engagés", political cinema denouncing the crimes committed by the former dictatorship. Meanwhile, he kept on making full-length pictures, such as O Princípio da Sabedoria [The Principle of Wisdom] or As Horas de Maria [Twelve Hours with Maria]. This last one, when released in 1979 was hardly attacked by the Portuguese Catholic Church under the charge of "blasphemy" and "moral and religious outrage". His next feature, Os Abismos da Meia-Noite [The Magic Springs of Gerenia], was a box office hit in Portugal, and won three national film awards: "Best Portuguese Film", "Best Script" and "Best Sound Design," and also "Best Actor" at the Rimini Film Festival.

Chá Forte com Limão [Black Tea With Lemon] was his last feature. Notwithstanding his extensive and original filmography, and in spite of the cultural trend of his cinema, Macedo's applications to get support from the film financing programs of the Portuguese Ministry of Culture were systematically rejected. When asked about the reasons why his film projects were so ill-regarded by the juries, some jurors would state that the negative verdicts were consequence of an "uninteresting cinema", "detached from reality", "fanciful and too much whimsical" (See as reference the interview published at the magazine of the Portuguese Authors Society). They alluded to the genre of most of Macedo's movies, which include weird elements, magic fantasy, dark fantasy, science-fiction and so on.

Without being able to go on filming, Macedo went on along with his other specializations, namely investigating and teaching film theory, film aesthetics, speculative fiction as well as comparative religion, spirituality, history of religion, sociology of religion, esoterology. He died in Lisbon, aged 86.

== Teacher and writer ==
After 1996, Macedo devoted himself exclusively to literature and to university teaching.

Alongside his career of motion-picture director, Macedo has also applied himself to teaching: since 1970 until 1974 he was a teacher in "Theory and Workshops of Film Direction" at the INP Institute (Lisbon), and until 1990 he taught "Cinema Aesthetics" and "Visual Semiotics" at the IADE Institute ("College of Fine Arts and Design," in Lisbon). After 1994 he was a professor of "Visual Semiotics" at the Lusófona University (Lisbon), and of "Filmic Language" and "Scriptwriting" at the Moderna University of Lisbon. From 2002 on, and at present, he is a professor of "Biblical Studies" and "Esoterology" at the Nova University of Lisbon.

=== Literature and essays ===
Macedo implied himself in writing and publishing novels, all of them of science-fiction and fantasy, pervaded by a Gothic and often magic atmosphere. Referring to Macedo's novels A Sonata de Cristal [The Crystal Sonata], Contos do Androthelys [Tales of the Androthelys], and others, the Portuguese scholar Teresa Sousa de Almeida, a professor of literature at Nova University of Lisbon, states:

Mixing SF with fantastic literature, Antonio de Macedo presents us with a strange and disturbing world, in which irony is always present. [. . .] Also surprising is the transfiguration that the real world sees itself going through when it is affected by the strangeness of a different reality. In the fantastic universe of Antonio de Macedo, the real world merely provides a set of signs which can only be deciphered with a key coming from another universe, to which only a few people have access. Thus, the reading of his works becomes an initiatory process in which the reader seeks out the occult truth hidden behind the story.

He also wrote essays on religion and Christian esotericism. One of them, Esoterismo da Bíblia [Esotericism of the Bible], is a treatise on Biblical esotericism which includes the lessons (from 2002 through 2006) of the course on "Biblical Esoterology" which Macedo taught at the Faculty of Human and Social Sciences (Nova University of Lisbon). This book deals with the conditions surrounding the birth, rise and fast expansion of Christianity in its early manifold currents, esoteric and exoteric, and its numberless manifestations, either official or marginal, in present times:

Its author, with his discreet and accessible erudition, explains the connections between the ancient texts and their historical, philosophical and religious antecedents, as well as their connection with the Mysteries, ancient and modern.

Macedo's doctorate dissertation is a comprehensive research on sociology of culture, sociology of religion and on esoterology of the New Testament texts, and was published in 2011 with the title Cristianismo Iniciático [Christianity and Initiation]. In a dense volume of 663 pages Macedo makes a deep study of the History and Sociology of the biblical texts, discussing especially the highest importance of the esoteric and heterodox interpretations of the Bible, and respective authors and currents since the production of the ancient biblical texts until today, and the profound significance of those interpretations to the development of mentality, culture, and science of the western civilisation.

== Filmography ==
=== full-length features ===
- 1965 – Domingo à Tarde (Sunday Afternoon)
- 1967 – Sete Balas para Selma (Seven Bullets for Selma)
- 1970 – Nojo aos Cães (Even Curs Feel Disgust)
- 1972 – A Promessa (The Vow)
- 1975 – O Rico, o Camelo e o Reino ou o Princípio da Sabedoria (The Principle of Wisdom)
- 1976 – As Horas de Maria (Twelve Hours with Maria)
- 1979 – O Príncipe com Orelhas de Burro (The Donkey-Eared Prince)
- 1983 – Os Abismos da Meia-Noite (The Magic Springs of Gerenia)
- 1987 – Os Emissários de Khalôm (The Emissaries From Khalom)
- 1989 – A Maldição de Marialva (The Curse of Marialva)
- 1993 – Chá Forte com Limão (Black Tea With Lemon)
- 2016 – O Segredo das Pedras Vivas (The Secret of the Waking Stones)

=== middle-length and short films ===
(selection)

- 1962 – Verão Coincidente (Coincident Summer)
- 1963 – Nicotiana (Nicotiana)
- 1966 – Crónica do Esforço Perdido (Chronicle of the Lost Struggle)
- 1967 – Alta Velocidade ([High Speed)
- 1968 – Albufeira
- 1968 – Fado: Lisboa 68
- 1968 – A Ginástica na Prevenção dos Acidentes (Exercises to Prevent Accidents)
- 1968 – A Revelação (The Revelation)
- 1969 – Almada-Negreiros Vivo Hoje (Almada Negreiros Alive today)
- 1970 – História Breve da Madeira Aglomerada (Brief History of Agglomerate Wood)
- 1971 – Cinco Temas para Refinaria & Quarteto (Five Themes for Refinery and Quartet)
- 1971 – Do Outro Lado do Rio: Almada (On the Other Side of the River: Almada)
- 1973 – Cenas de Caça no Baixo Alentejo (Hunting Scenes in Alentejo)
- 1973 – A Criança e a Justiça (Children and Justice)
- 1973 – Um Milhão de Vóltios (One Million Watts)
- 1982 – O Futuro do Mondego (The Future of Mondego)

=== television films and programs ===
(selection)

- 1975 – Fatima Story
- 1976 – O Outro Teatro (The Other Theater)
- 1981 – A Magia das Bonecas (Magic of Dolls) – 3 x 50'
- 1988 – Fernando Lanhas: Os Sete Rostos (Fernando Lanhas: The Seven Faces)
- 1992 – O Altar dos Holocaustos (The Altar of the Holocausts) – 3 x 50'
- 1996 – Santo António de Todo o Mundo (Saint Anthony of the Whole World)

== Books ==
=== film theory ===
- 1959 / 60 – A Evolução Estética do Cinema (The Evolution of Film Aesthetics), two volumes

=== essays on philosophy and esotericism ===
- 1961 – Da Essência da Libertação (On the Essence of Freedom)
- 1999 – Instruções Iniciáticas (Initiatory Teachings)
- 2002 – Laboratório Mágico (Magic Laboratory)
- 2003 – O Neoprofetismo e a Nova Gnose (New Prophetism and New Gnosis)
- 2006 – Esoterismo da Bíblia (Esotericism of the Bible)
- 2006 – Textos Neo-Gnósticos (Texts on New Gnosticism)
- 2011 – Cristianismo Iniciático (Christianity and Initiation)
- 2016 – A Provocadora Realidade dos Mundos Imaginários (The Provocative Reality of Imaginary Worlds)

=== science fiction & fantasy ===
- 1992 – O Limite de Rudzky (Rudzky's Limit) – short stories collection
- 1993 – Contos do Androthelys (Tales of the Androthelys) – novel
- 1995 – Sulphira & Lucyphur (Sulphira & Lucyphur) – novel
- 1996 – A Sonata de Cristal (The Crystal Sonata) – novel
- 1998 – Erotosofia (Erotosophy) – novel
- 2000 – O Cipreste Apaixonado (The Impassioned Cypress) – novel
- 2004 – As Furtivas Pegadas da Serpente (The Stealthy Footprints of the Snake) – novel
- 2007 – A Conspiração dos Abandonados (The Conspiracy of the Abandoned) – short stories collection

=== stage plays ===
- 1983 – A Pomba (The Dove)
- 1984 – A Nova Ilusão (The New Illusion)
- 1989 – O Osso de Mafoma (Mahomet's Bone)
- 2011 – O Sangue e o Fogo, trilogy (The Blood and the Fire, trilogy)

== Bibliography ==
- (in Portuguese) António de Macedo: cinema, a viragem de uma época (António de Macedo: cinema, a turning point of an epoch), by José de Matos-Cruz, Publicações Dom Quixote, Lisbon, 2000
- (in Portuguese) O Cais do Olhar by José de Matos-Cruz, Portuguese Cinematheque, 1999

== See also ==
- Cinema of Portugal
- Documentary film
- Novo Cinema
- Science fiction
- Speculative fiction
