= João Ratão =

- Directed by: Jorge Brum do Canto
- Starring: Óscar de Lemos; Maria Domingas; António Silva; Manuel Santos Carvalho; Teresa Cazal
- Release date: 29 April 1940 (Portugal)
- Running time: 103 minutes
- Country: Portugal
- Language: Portuguese

João Ratão is a 1940 Portuguese film directed by Jorge Brum do Canto and starring Óscar de Lemos, Maria Domingas and António Silva. It was released on 29 April 1940.

== Cast ==
- Óscar de Lemos
- Maria Domingas
- António Silva
- Manuel Santos Carvalho
- Teresa Cazal
