= Cinemateca Portuguesa =

Film archive in Lisbon, Portugal

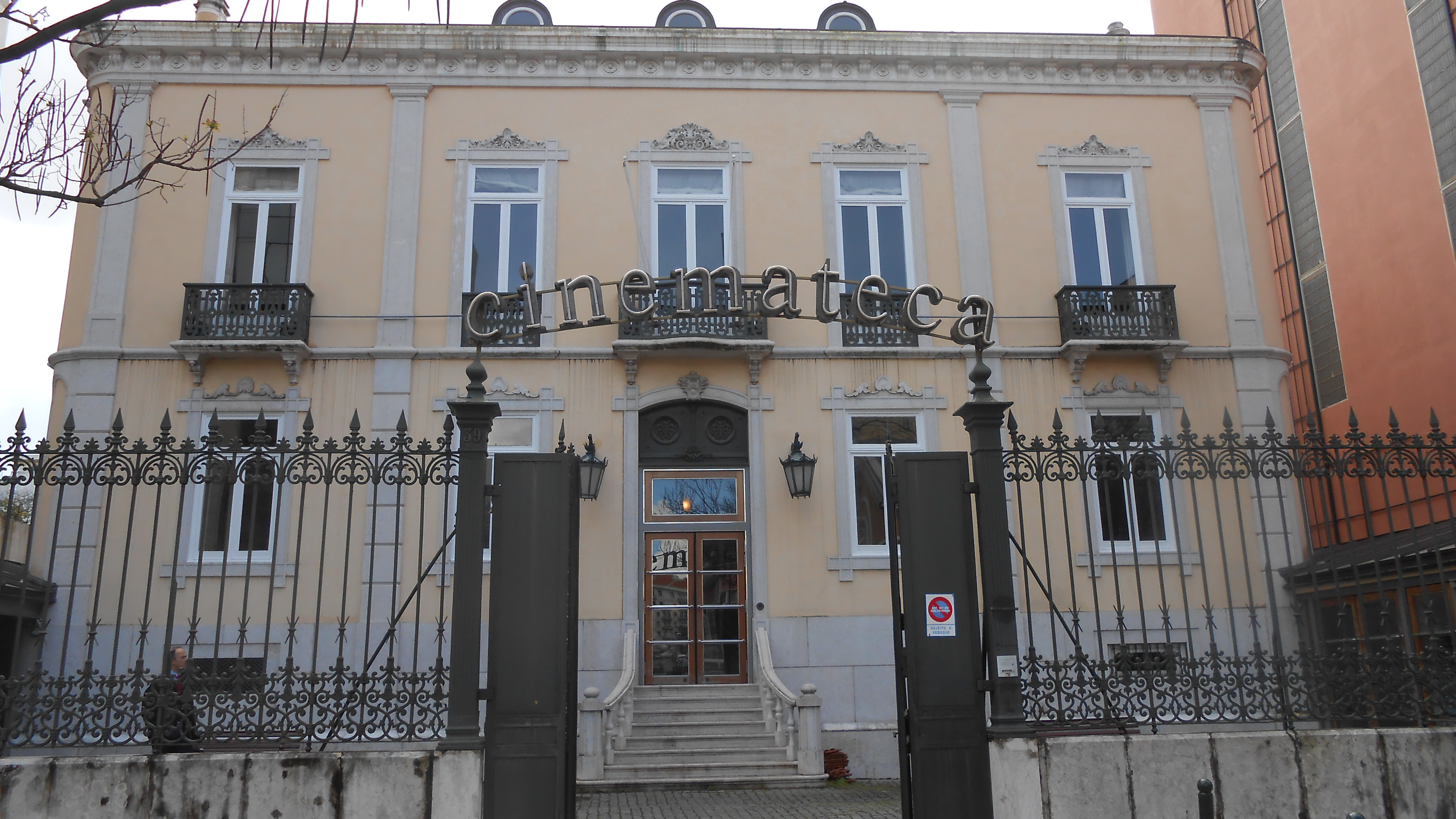
Cinemateca Portuguesa

Cinemateca Portuguesa is a public institution dedicated to the diffusion and preservation of the filmic arts in Portugal and, in particular, of Portuguese Cinema. It functions as a film archive and promotes daily screenings of worldwide films at its headquarters, now located on Rua Barata Salgueiro in Lisbon. It was established in 1948.

The Cinemateca Portuguesa provides film festivals, film screenings, presentations, a museum exhibition, a bookshop, and a restaurant.

== History ==
The Portuguese Cinematheque was established in 1948, during the Estado Novo regime, based on a collection originating from the former National Propaganda Secretariat, which later became the National Information Secretariat (SNI). This body was responsible for promoting cultural activities under the government of António de Oliveira Salazar. The institution’s first director, then known as the National Cinematheque, was Manuel Félix Ribeiro, an employee of the SNI. On 29 September 1958, the first public and independent film screening organized by the Cinematheque took place at Palace Foz. The following day, 30 September, its Library officially opened to the public.

In 1973, during the final years of Marcelo Caetano’s government, the Portuguese Cinematheque was incorporated into the Portuguese Institute of Cinema, becoming one of its departments. It retained this structure until 1979 under the leadership of Manuel Félix Ribeiro, who remained in office even after the political transition following the 25th of April Revolution of 1974. In 1982, he was succeeded by Luís de Pina.

In 1979, during the government of Carlos Mota Pinto, the Portuguese state acquired number 39 on Rua Barata Salgueiro, a residence that had belonged to the family of lawyer and politician Morais Carvalho. The building had been erected on land purchased from Barata Salgueiro himself in 1887. It then became the home of the Portuguese Cinematheque, which was incorporated as a directorate within the Ministry of Culture. The new cinema officially opened to the public in 1980.

In 1991, under Prime Minister Aníbal Cavaco Silva, João Bénard da Costa became director of the Cinematheque, having served as deputy director since 1980. Between 2001 and 2002, the building underwent restoration works led by architects Alberto Castro Nunes and António Maria Braga, winners of the 2019 Rafael Manzano Prize. During that period, the institution’s activities temporarily took place at the Palácio Foz. In December 2002, the Cinematheque reopened its premises on Rua Barata Salgueiro, featuring refurbished screening rooms and the museum space “39 Degraus.”

During João Bénard da Costa’s tenure, the Cinemateca focused on the regular screening of major works in film history, following the example of the Cinémathèque Française. His leadership also oversaw the renovation of the facilities and the strengthening of the institution’s role as a film museum, with special attention to film preservation and restoration. However, unlike its French counterpart — which created the “Bibliothèque du Film” (BiFi) — Bénard da Costa did not prioritise establishing a similar resource in Portugal. As a result, films held in the archive remained largely inaccessible to researchers and cinephiles outside the scheduled screenings.

After his term ended (1991–2009), Maria João Seixas was appointed director of the Cinemateca in January 2010, under the government of José Sócrates. In 2014, during Pedro Passos Coelho’s administration, José Manuel Costa — an employee of the institution since 1975 and former deputy director between 1995–1997 and 2010–2014 — became the new director. The Cinemateca is currently headed by Rui Machado.

== See also ==
- List of film archives
- Cinema of Portugal
- List of archives in Portugal
