= Laura Alves =

Portuguese theatre and film actress

Laura Alves DmSE
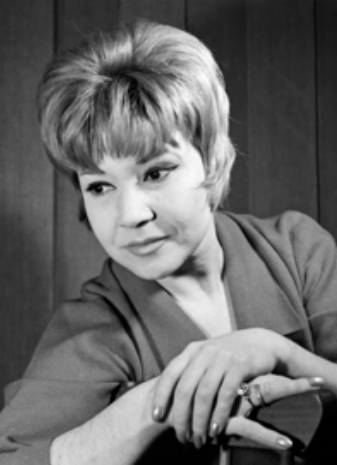
- Laura Alves, 1964
- Born: Laura Alves Magno; 8 September 1921; Lisbon, Portugal
- Died: 7 May 1986 (aged 64); Lisbon, Portugal
- Occupation: actor
- Years active: 45
- Known for: Lisbon theatre and Portuguese films
- Spouses: Vasco Morgado; Frederico Valério
- Children: 1 son

Laura Alves DmSE (8 September 1921 – 7 May 1986) was a Portuguese actress on stage, film and radio.

== Early life ==
Laura Alves Magno was born in Lisbon, Portugal on 8 September 1921, the daughter of Mariana Alves and Celestino Magno. She attended the Machado de Castro School (now the site of Lisbon’s Hotel and Tourism School) and the National Conservatory School of Lisbon (Conservatório Nacional de Lisboa). She first performed live at the age of five in a play by a recreational group of which her father was a member.

At six she performed with the Lisbon Amateur Dramatics Group (Grupo Dramático Lisbonense) and continued to perform at her school. Her professional debut came in 1935, 20 days before her fourteenth birthday, when she played opposite the well-known Portuguese actor Alves da Cunha in “The two girls of Paris” (As duas garotas de Paris) at Lisbon’s Teatro Politeama. She then spent two seasons at the D. Maria II National Theatre in Lisbon.

From the time she was 14, her father, a shoemaker by profession and a victim of schizophrenia, was unable to work and Alves became the family's financial provider.

== Career ==
In 1941 she performed her first operetta, at the Teatro Variedades in Lisbon. In 1942, she performed in a revue for the first time at the Teatro Maria Vitória, alongside Amália Rodrigues, the actress and fado singer. Throughout her career she performed about 400 plays, musicals and other shows. Several were taken on tour, both within Portugal and to Spain and Brazil. When not acting she travelled to London, Paris and New York to familiarise herself with the latest theatrical trends. A large number of her performances were at the Teatro Monumental, which opened in November 1951 and was leased by the actor and impresario Vasco Morgado, who Alves had married in 1948.

This theatre had over one thousand seats and for it to be commercially viable had to offer shows popular to the general public. Alves' popularity and her commitment to her husband meant that she performed frequently at the Monumental. Her presence on the cast guaranteed that a play would be a success. As a result, she had few chances to explore her range in less-popular plays. Critics would often note that her talents were being wasted, although she did occasionally venture into more demanding characters, such as in plays by Shakespeare, as Margaret in Cat on a Hot Tin Roof by Tennessee Williams and in plays by the Portuguese playwright Bernardo Santareno. She also did radio theatre on the RCP station (Rádio Clube Português).

With the growth in the popularity of television, the size of the Teatro Monumental meant that it gradually ceased to be viable as a theatre. It was demolished in 1982, to great controversy. The event is said to have badly affected Laura Alves' health. Unhappy with the destruction of the theatre where she had achieved success and, suffering from memory lapses, she stopped performing in 1983. In her last performance Alves was visibly weak. Her popularity had also been affected by her criticisms of the Carnation Revolution in 1974, which had seen the overthrow of the Estado Novo, the authoritarian government that had controlled Portugal for half a century.

Alves is now known to the Portuguese public primarily for the films she made, which are still shown on Portugal’s TV stations. In particular, three films made in the 1940s remain popular; her first, The Tyrant Father (O Pai Tirano); O Leão da Estrela; and O Pátio das Cantigas.

Alves won many awards. In 1966, the Government awarded her the rank of Dame of the Military Order of Saint James of the Sword (Portuguese: Ordem Militar de Sant'Iago da Espada). She was Best Cinema Actress in 1952 and won the Prémio Lucinda Simões for best theatre actress in 1953. In 1986 a film of her life, Laura Alves, Evocação de uma actriz (Laura Alves, Evocation of an actress) was released. A new film based on her life was at the planning stage at the end of 2019. Her name has been given to several streets in the Greater Lisbon area. Alves was featured on a 1996 postage stamp celebrating 100 years of cinema in Portugal.

Alves separated from Morgado in 1967, but they continued to work together. In 1968, Morgado transformed the Cinema Rex in Lisbon into a theatre that he called Teatro Laura Alves. The theatre closed in the 1980s and, in 2012, the building was destroyed by fire. After Morgado’s death in 1978 she married the conductor, Frederico Valério, who was to die three years later.

== Death ==
She died in Lisbon on 6 May 1986 of a cerebral embolism.

== Movies ==
- O Pai Tirano, (1941)
- O Pátio das Cantigas, (1941)
- O Leão da Estrela, (1947)
- Sonhar é Fácil, (1951)
- Um Marido Solteiro, (1952)
- O Costa d'África, (1954)
- Perdeu-se um Marido, (1956)
