= A Menina da Rádio =

- Directed by: Arthur Duarte
- Written by: João Bastos
- Release date: 1944
- Country: Portugal
- Language: Portuguese

A Menina da Rádio is a 1944 Portuguese musical film comedy directed by Arthur Duarte.

== Cast ==
- Maria Matos ... D. Rosa Gonçalves
- António Silva ... Cipriano Lopes
- Maria Eugénia ... Geninha, a Menina da Rádio
- Francisco Ribeiro ... Fortunato
- Óscar de Lemos ... Óscar
- Teresa Casal ... Teresa Waldemar
- Aida Ultz ... Aidinha Seabra
- Maria Olguim ... Maria do Ó
- Manuel Santos Carvalho ... Leitão
- Silvestre Alegrim ... Night-watchman
- Vital dos Santos
- Sales Ribeiro
- Emilia D'Oliveira
- Leticia Brazao
- Mendonça de Carvalho
