= Camões (film) =

1946 film

- Directed by: José Leitão de Barros
- Written by: José Leitão de Barros; Afonso Lopes Vieira
- Starring: António Vilar
- Cinematography: Francesco Izzarelli; Manuel Luís Vieira
- Edited by: Vieira de Sousa
- Release date: 20 September 1946
- Running time: 118 minutes
- Country: Portugal
- Language: Portuguese

Camões is a 1946 Portuguese drama film directed by José Leitão de Barros. It was entered into the 1946 Cannes Film Festival.

== Cast ==
- António Vilar as Luís de Camões
- José Amaro as Dom Manuel de Portugal
- Igrejas Caeiro as André Falcão de Resende
- Paiva Raposo as Pero de Andrade Caminha
- Dina Salazar as Bourgeoisie of Coimbra
- Idalina Guimarães as Inês
- Leonor Maia as Leonor
- Manuel Lereno
- Júlio Pereira
- Carlos Moutinho as Caminha's Friend
- Carmen Dolores
