= Chianca de Garcia =

Portuguese film director

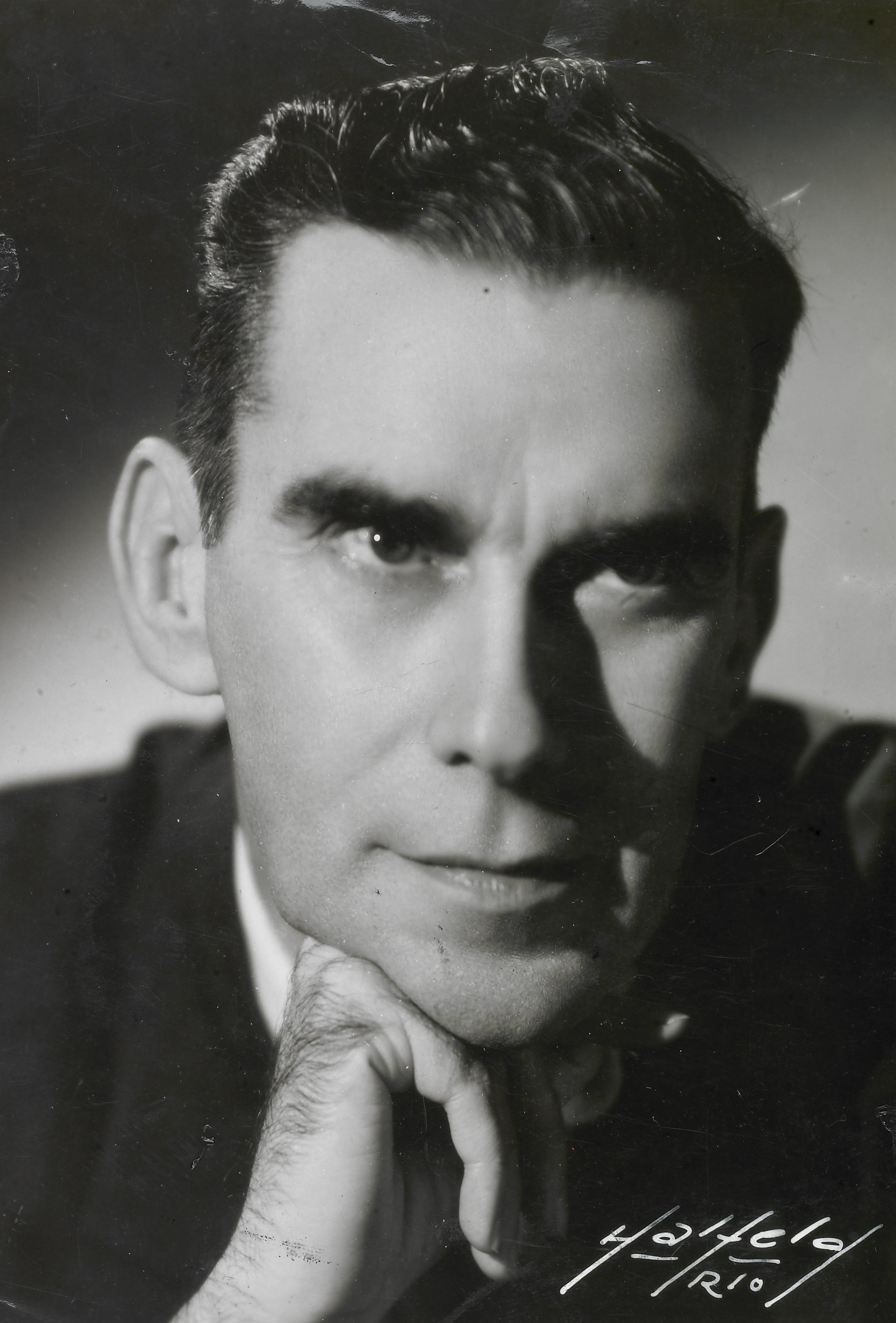
- Born: Chianca de Garcia; 14 May 1898; Lisbon, Portugal
- Died: 28 January 1983 (aged 84); Rio de Janeiro, Brazil
- Occupation: Film director

Chianca de Garcia (14 May 1898 – 28 January 1983) was a Portuguese film director.

- Pureza 1940 based on Pureza (José Lins do Rego novel)
