= Vasco Santana =

Portuguese actor (1898–1958)

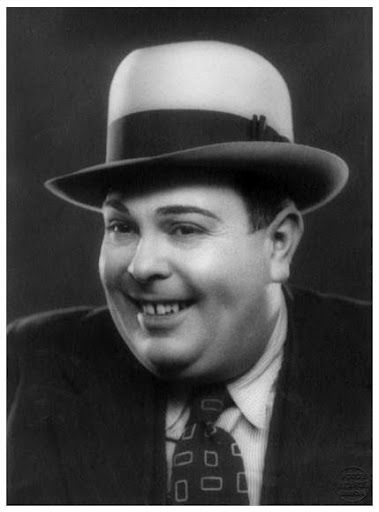

Vasco António Rodrigues Santana (28 January 1898 in Lisbon – 13 June 1958) was a Portuguese actor, one of the most renowned of the classical era of Portuguese cinema.

He already had a long career in theatre when he played the main character in the first Portuguese sound film, A Canção de Lisboa, in 1933. He starred in about one dozen films.
