= Perdigão Queiroga =

Portuguese film producer and director

José Manuel Nobre Perdigão Queiroga (12 June 1916 in Évora, Sé e São Pedro – 8 May 1980 in road accident, Alcoentre, Azambuja), son with his sister Maria José of Joaquim José Perdigão Queiroga (b. Évora) and second wife Mariana Nobre, was a Portuguese film producer and film director.

He married Aida de las Nieves Villar y Trimiño (b. and d. in Lisbon), daughter of Ernesto Villar and wife Ramona Trimiño (both b. in Spain and d. in Lisbon), and had an issue.

His half-brother-in-law was António José de Almeida.

== Bibliographic references ==
- (in Portuguese) O Cais do Olhar by José de Matos-Cruz, Portuguese Cinematheque, 1999
