= Jorge Brum do Canto =

Portuguese film director and actor (1910–1994)

- Born: Jorge Júdice Limpo Brum do Canto; 10 February 1910; Lisbon, Portugal
- Died: 7 February 1994 (aged 83)
- Occupations: Director, actor
- Years active: 1929–1984

Jorge Júdice Limpo Brum do Canto (10 February 1910 – 7 February 1994) was a Portuguese film director and actor. His career spanned over a half-century, from 1929 to 1984.

== Biography ==
Jorge Brum do Canto was born in Lisbon into a family with aristocratic Flemish and English roots. He attended high school and enrolled in the University of Lisbon School of Law, but did not finish his degree. Brum do Canto wrote about film; in 1925 he took his first acting role, a part in Rino Lupo's film O Desconhecido. From 1927 to 1929, Brum do Canto wrote for the newspaper O Século. Meanwhile, he edited and/or collaborated on several cinema magazines flourishing at the time (Cinéfilo, Kino and Imagem).

Interested in the French vanguard, he followed their lead as a director in his first film (A Dança dos Paroxismos), shot at the end of 1929. The film (produced by Mello, Castello Branco, Lda.) was first shown in November 1930; it was presented again on October 27, 1984, in the Cinemateca Portuguesa, which has its negatives and the only existing copies. Two years later he produced another film, Paisagem, but it was never completed for financial reasons. Until 1935 he shot more minor documentaries as an amateur, turning professional later that year when he assisted director Leitão de Barros on As Pupilas do Senhor Reitor. The following year, Brun do Canto was again assistant director on Chianca de Garcia's O Trevo de Quatro Folhas.

In 1936–37, after several unsuccessful productions Brum do Canto directed his first feature film, A Canção da Terra; it was well received at its premiere. Brum do Canto's career then became more prolific; by the early 1950s he had shot six more feature films. From 1953 to 1959 he interrupted his cinematic career and left his home in Lisbon, establishing himself on Porto Santo Island in Madeira (where he owned large properties) and dedicating himself to agriculture and sport fishing.

Brum do Canto returned to cinema during the next decade with three films. In 1973, the Portuguese audience discovered him as an actor in theatrical plays broadcast by RTP. He acted successfully in Paddy Chayefsky's O Grande Negócio and Reginald Rose's Twelve Angry Men, both directed by Artur Ramos. Still acting, Brum do Canto returned to RTP in 1975 in the TV series Angústia para o Jantar directed by Jaime Silva.

== Filmography ==
=== As director ===
- O Crime de Simão Bolandas (1984)
- Cruz de Ferro (1967)
- Fado Corrido (1964)
- Retalhos da Vida de Um Médico (1962)
- Chaimite (1953)
- Ladrão, Precisa-se!... (1946)
- Um Homem às Direitas (1945)
- Fátima, Terra de Fé (1943)
- Lobos da Serra (1942)
- João Ratão (1940)
- A Canção da Terra (1938)
- A Hora H (1938)
- Berlengas (1934)
- A Doença dos Ulmeiros (1934)
- A Obra da Junta Autónoma das Estradas (1934)
- O Bicho da Seda (1934)
- Abrantes (1933)
- Nada de Novo... em Óbidos (1933)
- Sintra, Cenário de Filme Romântico (1933)
- Uma Tarde em Alcácer (1933)
- Fabricação de Mangueiras (1932)
- A Dança dos Paroxismos (1929)

=== As actor (in his own films) ===
- A Dança dos Paroxismos
- A Hora H (as a member of the Orquestra Aldrabófona)
- Chaimite
- Fado Corrido
- A Cruz de Ferro

== Bibliography ==
- (in Portuguese) Dicionário do Cinema Português (1962–1988) by Jorge Leitão Ramos, Editorial Caminho, SA, Lisbon, 1989
- (in Portuguese) O Cais do Olhar by José de Matos-Cruz, Portuguese Cinematheque, 1999
