= Ribeirinho =

Portuguese actor and director

- Born: Francisco Carlos Lopes Ribeiro; 21 September 1911; Lisbon, Portugal
- Died: 7 February 1984 (aged 72); Lisbon, Portugal
- Occupations: Director, Actor

Ribeirinho, stage name of Francisco Carlos Lopes Ribeiro (Lisbon, 21 September 1911 – Lisbon, 7 February 1984) was a Portuguese actor and director.

He started his career in theatre in 1929, and kept the connection all his life, both as an actor and as a manager. However, he is best known today for his comic roles in several films of the 1930s and 1940s, namely O Pai Tirano (The Tyrant Father, 1941) and O Pátio das Cantigas (Songs' Yard or Courtyard of Songs, 1942), which he also directed.

Son of Manuel Henrique Correia da Silva Ribeiro and wife Ester da Nazaré Lopes, he was the younger brother of António Lopes Ribeiro, one of the most famous directors of the Golden Age of Portuguese cinema, who directed him in several films.

He married actress Maria Adelaide da Silva Lalande (Castelo Branco, Salgueiro do Campo, 7 November 1913 - Lisbon, 21 March 1968), daughter of José Inocêncio Lalande (born Castelo Branco, Salgueiro do Campo) and Virgínia Carma da Silva (born Vila Franca de Xira, Vila Franca de Xira), and had an only daughter, Maria Manuel Lalande Lopes Ribeiro. His wife had a natural daughter by Clotário Luís Ribeiro Supico Pinto (1909–1986, son of Liberato Damião Ribeiro Pinto and Maria Augusta Supico).
