= António Lopes Ribeiro =

Portuguese film director (1908–1995)

- Born: António Filipe Lopes Ribeiro; 16 April 1908; Lisbon, Portugal
- Died: 14 April 1995 (aged 86); Lisbon, Portugal
- Occupation: Film director

António Filipe Lopes Ribeiro (16 April 1908 in Lisbon – 1995) was a Portuguese film director.

Son of Manuel Henrique Correia da Silva Ribeiro and wife Ester da Nazaré Lopes, he was the older brother of actor Ribeirinho.

== Filmography ==
- Dia de Portugal na Expo'70 (1970)
- Portugal de Luto na Morte de Salazar (1970)
- Portugal na Expo'70 (1970)
- Casa Bancária Pinto de Magalhães (1963)
- Instituto de Oncologia (1963)
- I Salão de Antiguidades, O (1963)
- Artes ao Serviço da Nação, As (1962)
- Arte Sacra (1960)
- Indústrias Regionais (1960)
- Monumentos de Belém, Os (1960)
- Mosteiros Portugueses (1960)
- Primo Basílio, O (1959)
- Comemorações Nacionais (1958)
- Portugal na Exposição Universal de Bruxelas (1958)
- 30 Anos com Salazar (1957)
- A Gloriosa Viagem ao Brasil (1957)
- A Rainha Isabel II em Portugal (1957)
- A Viagem Presidencial ao Brasil (1957)
- A Visita a Portugal da Rainha Isabel II da Grã Bretanha (1957)
- A Visita do Ministro Paulo Cunha aos Portugueses da Califórnia (1956)
- A Visita do Chefe do Estado à Ilha da Madeira (1955)
- Cortejos de Oferendas (1953)
- Jubileu de Salazar, O (1953)
- A Viagem Presidencial a Espanha (1953)
- A Celebração do 28 de Maio de 1952 (1952)
- Rodas de Lisboa, As (1951)
- Frei Luís de Sousa (1950)
- Algarve d'Além-Mar (1950)
- Casas para Trabalhadores (1950)
- A Festa dos Tabuleiros em Tomar (1950)
- Segurança Social e Assistência Médica (1950)
- Serviços Médico-Sociais (1950)
- Trabalho e Previdência (1950)
- Estampas Antigas de Portugal (1949)
- Só Tem Varíola Quem Quer (1949)
- Lisboa de Hoje e de Amanhã (1948)
- Anjos e Demónios (1947)
- Cortejo Histórico de Lisboa, O (1947)
- A Vizinha do Lado (1945)
- Ilhas Crioulas de Cabo Verde, As (1945)
- A Morte e a Vida do Engenheiro Duarte Pacheco (1944)
- Inauguração do Estádio Nacional (1944)
- Amor de Perdição (1943)
- Portugal na Exposição de Paris de 1937 (1942)
- The Tyrant Father (1941)
- Feitiço do Império (1940)
- Guiné, Berço do Império (1940)
- Viagem de Sua Excelência o Presidente da República a Angola (1939)
- Exposição Histórica da Ocupação (1938)
- A Revolução de Maio (1937)
- Fogos Reais na Escola Prática de Infantaria (1935)
- Wild Cattle (1934)
- A Preparação do Filme 'Gado Bravo' (1933)
- Curso de Oficiais Milicianos em Mafra (1932)
- Uma Batida em Malpique (1929)
- Bailando ao Sol (1928)

== Bibliographic references ==
- (in Portuguese) O Cais do Olhar by José de Matos-Cruz, Portuguese Cinematheque, 1999
