= Arthur Duarte =

Portuguese actor and director (1895–1982)

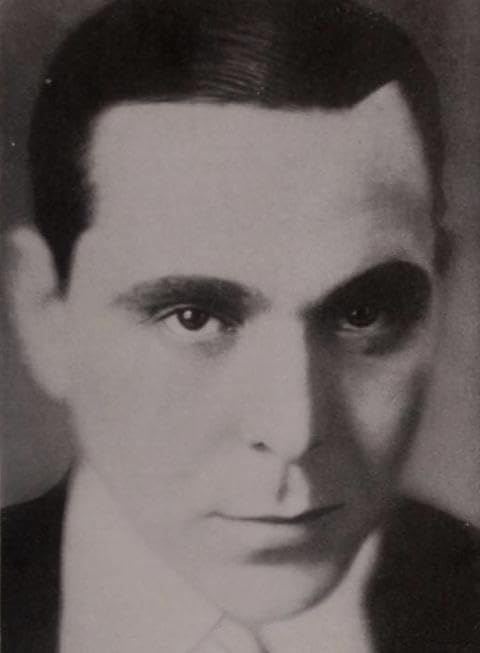
- Born: Arthur Duarte; 17 October 1895; Lisbon, Portugal
- Died: 22 August 1982 (aged 86); Lisbon, Portugal
- Occupations: Actor, Director, Screenwriter, Production designer
- Years active: 1930-1977

Arthur Duarte (1895–1982) was a Portuguese actor, screenwriter, production designer and film director.

Originally beginning his career in cinema as an actor, he played several small roles in Germany, France, Switzerland and Austria.

He made his feature film debut with the 1938 adaptation of Júlio Dinis's novel, Os Fidalgos da Casa Mourisca. However, his most significant achievements came in the comedy genre, with notable works such as O Leão da Estrela and O Costa do Castelo.

He was married to actress Teresa Casal, who participated in several of his films. Their marriage ended in separation during the mid-1950s.

Beyond feature films, his body of work also included short films, documentaries, and advertising productions.

== Selected filmography ==
- Carmen (1926)
- The Republic of Flappers (1928)
- Because I Love You (1928)
- Ludwig II, King of Bavaria (1929)
- Column X (1929)
- Rustle of Spring (1929)
- Women on the Edge (1929)
- Love in the Ring (1930)
- Mischievous Miss (1930)
- The Woman Without Nerves (1930)
- Scapa Flow (1930)
- Wild Cattle (1934)
- Os Fidalgos da Casa Mourisca (1938)
- O Costa do Castelo (1943)
- A Menina da Rádio (1944)
- O Leão da Estrela (1947)
- O Grande Elias (1950)
- A Garça e a Serpente (1952)
- O Noivo das Caldas (1956)
- Em Legítima Defesa — Encontro com a Morte (1965)
- Recompensa (1977)
