= Anita Guerreiro =

Portuguese fado singer and actress (1936–2025)

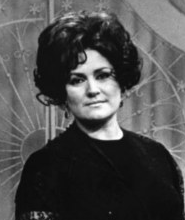
- Guerreiro in 1967

Background information
- Born: Bebiana Guerreiro Rocha; 13 November 1936; Lisbon, Portugal
- Died: 7 December 2025 (aged 89) Lisbon, Portugal
- Genres: Fado
- Occupations: Singer; actress
- Instrument: Vocals
- Years active: 1952–2025
- Labels: Movieplay

Anita Guerreiro (13 November 1936 – 7 December 2025) was a Portuguese actress and fado singer.

== Early life ==
Guerreiro was born to a show business family as Bebiana Guerreiro Rocha, in the capital of Portugal, Lisbon, on 13 November 1936. As a child, she lived with her father and stepmother. By the age of seven, she was already performing, singing among family and friends in the sports club of her local community. In December 1952, she competed on the Tribunal da Canção, a radio singing competition, and attracted by far the most applause from the audience. The programme's producer, surprised by the quality of her performance, then arranged for her to sing at the Café Luso in Lisbon, a restaurant famous for hosting fado singers. There she adopted the stage name of Anita Guerreiro. She married Pepe Cardinalli and they had two children.

== Career ==
In 1954, A Voz de Portugal, a magazine devoted to popular song, highlighted Guerreiro in its Cantam Estrelas (Stars Sing) section. This magazine would also feature one of Guerreiro's first popular songs, Menina Lisboa (Lisbon Girl). In 1955, she made her stage debut at the Teatro Maria Vitória in the Parque Mayer theatre district of Lisbon, in the revue Ó Zé aperta o laco, and then appeared in another revue, Festa é Festa, at the same theatre. She followed this with many other appearances in revues, a popular form of entertainment in Portugal at the time, known as Teatro de Revista (Magazine shows). In 1956, she sang in the film Lisbon produced and directed by Ray Milland.

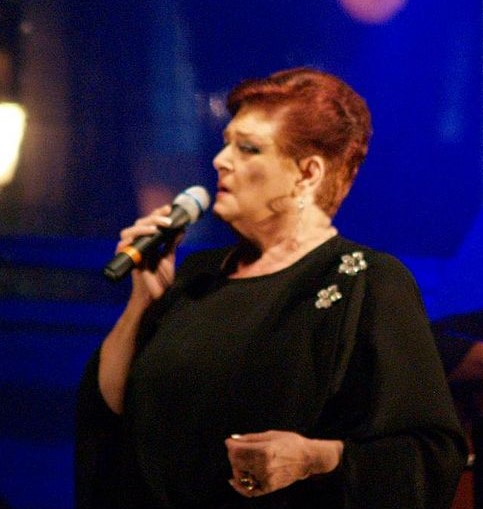
Guerreiro performing in 2008

In Parque Mayer, Guerreiro founded and ran a bar called Adega da Anita, which attracted many of the great fado singers. However, she closed it when her husband was posted to Angola, then a Portuguese colony, where they stayed for three years. After her return to Lisbon, she joined the cast at the Teatro Capitólio, performing in reviews. Her popularity led to composers wanting to write songs specifically for her, many of which became hits. These included possibly her most popular song, Cheira Bem, Cheira a Lisboa (Smells Good. Smells like Lisbon), which she first performed in the revue Peço a Palavra, at Teatro Variedades, Lisbon in 1969, when the audience demanded several encores. This and other songs led to her winning the Estevão Amarante Prize for Best Magazine (Revue) Artist in 1970. Around the same time, she also won awards in Portugal's colonies, such as at the Luanda Song Festival.

She then left revue shows for a decade, but continued to sing and record fado in Europe, Canada, and the US, performing particularly for Portuguese emigrant communities. She returned to the Lisbon theatre in 1982 in a revue at the Teatro Variedades. Later she moved into television, where she was one of the leading performers in several Portuguese soap operas and other series. These included Primeiro Amor (1995), Roseira Brava (1996), Uma Casa em Fanicos, (1998), Os Batanetes (2004), and Sentimentos (2009). In between, she returned to the cinema in 1997, for a role in the film Morte Macaca, directed by Jeanne Waltz.

== Recognition ==
In a tribute to Guerreiro's career, Movieplay released a CD in 1994, part of its O Melhor dos Melhores (Best of the Best) collection, with some of her biggest hits. She was invited to be the "Godmother" of several Marchas Populares (popular marches) in Lisbon. A tribute concert was held for her on 17 February 2004 at the Teatro São Luiz in Lisbon, to commemorate her 50 years as a fado singer. In November 2004, the City Council of Lisbon awarded her the Gold Municipal Medal of Merit. In 2005, Movieplay released an anthology of her work with 30 of her biggest hits. A television programme to celebrate her 82nd birthday included a message of greeting from the Portuguese president, Marcelo Rebelo de Sousa.

== Later life and death ==
In 2018, Guerreiro was still performing three times a week in a Lisbon fado restaurant. As of the end of 2023, she was living in Lisbon at the Casa do Artista, a rest home for former artists. She died there on 7 December 2025, at the age of 89.
