= Francisco Nicholson =

Portuguese stage actor, director and playwright

- Born: Francisco António de Vasconcelos Nicholson; 26 June 1938; Portugal
- Died: 12 April 2016 Age 77; Lisbon, Portugal
- Occupations: actor, director and writer
- Known for: Lisbon theatre and television
- Spouse(s): (1) Colette Liliane Dubois; (2) Magda Cardoso
- Children: one daughter with (1)

Francisco Nicholson (1938 – 2016) was a Portuguese actor, director, playwright, songwriter and screenwriter. He was a co-founder of the Teatro Ádóque theatre cooperative. He wrote, directed, and acted in revues and was a writer of television soap operas, among many other accomplishments.

== Early life ==
Francisco António de Vasconcelos Nicholson was born on 26 June 1938, the son of John Francis Quintela Nicholson, who was born in Southsea, in Hampshire, England and his wife Maria Alice de Vasconcelos Marques. His father had an English father and a Portuguese mother. Coming from an artistic family, Nicholson started doing theatrical performances at the age of 14 while attending the prestigious Camões Secondary School in the Portuguese capital of Lisbon. On the strength of this he was invited to join a theatre group of other young artists. Facing opposition from his parents regarding his choice of a theatrical career he trained to join the Merchant Navy, but was clearly unsuited for this. He then studied drama in Paris at the Charles Dullin Academy, together with French actors such as Jean Vilar, Georges Wilson, and Gérard Philipe.

== Professional career ==
Nicholson made his professional debut as an actor and author with the Gerifalto Theatre Company, performing a children's play. Five other plays written by him for children were performed. He next worked with the National Theatre Company and the Studio Theatre of Lisbon, performing in works by authors such as August Strindberg, Bernard Shaw and Arnold Wesker. He was then invited by Raul Solnado to take part in the first play performed at the new Teatro Villaret in Lisbon, which was Nikolai Gogol's play, The Inspector General.

Nicholson became popular amongst the wider public by performing in what is known in Portugal as Teatro de Revista ("Magazine" shows, or Revues), initially as a performer at the Teatro ABC in Lisbon, and then as a co-author of the innovative show Gente Nova em Bikini (New people in bikinis), which as a huge success and was followed by other similarly successful revues. He also performed at the Teatro Monumental, where he directed the musical Férias em Lisboa (Holidays in Lisbon). On television he made himself known with Riso e Ritmo (Rice and rhythm) (1964), a programme in which he was the author, producer and one of the actors. He also had considerable success as a song writer and as a screenwriter.

With the impresario, Sérgio de Azevedo, Nicholson returned to the Teatro ABC in 1972. One of his revues, Tudo a Nu (Everything naked), was being performed on 25 April 1974 when the Carnation Revolution overthrew the Estado Novo dictatorship. With the end of censorship after the revolution, the cuts made by the Estado Novo censors were put back and the name was changed to Tudo a Nu com Parra Nova (Everything naked with a new fig leaf). However, the liberated approach of Nicholson and some of the other performers led to conflict with the management of the Teatro ABC and they left to form the Teatro Ádóque as a cooperative, which became recognised for its different approach to the presentation of revues. According to Nicholson, "we were irreverent, shameless, impertinent, naughty, but always fraternal, generous... Always with the concern to be politically very incorrect".

Nicholson was the author of Vila Faia, the first Portuguese TV soap opera. After the closure of the Ádóque in 1982 he moved to Teatro Maria Vitória, starring in a succession of revues, while also directing and performing in television programmes and, later, writing other soap operas. In 2014 he wrote a novel, Os Mortos não dão Autógrafos (The dead don't give autographs).

Francisco Nicholson married twice, first with Colette Liliane Dubois in 1969, with whom he had a daughter, the actress Sofia Nicholson, and second with the dancer and actress Magda Cardoso. He died on 12 April 2016, at the age of 77, in Lisbon, following complications from a liver transplant that he had undergone in 2011.
