= Ivone Silva =

Portuguese theatre, television and film actress (1936–1987)

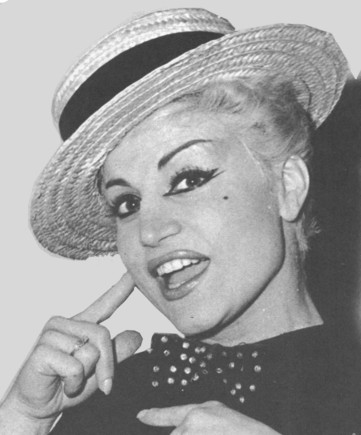
- Born: Maria Ivone da Silva Nunes; 24 April 1936; Ferreira do Zêzere, Santarém District, Portugal
- Died: 20 November 1987 (aged 51); Lisbon, Portugal
- Occupation: Actress
- Years active: 25
- Known for: Performances in revues and comedies on the Lisbon stage; TV performances
- Notable work: Sabadabadu

Maria Ivone da Silva Nunes (1936 — 1987), better known as Ivone Silva, was a Portuguese actress. She became famous for her humorous work on television and in revues.

== Early life ==
Silva was the daughter of José António da Silva and Ermelinda Rosa Nunes Dias, both of whom worked as tailors. She was born on 24 April 1936 in Paio Mendes, a village located in the municipality of Ferreira do Zêzere in Portugal's Santarém District. From a very early age she was exposed to the performing arts, as her father was also an actor, having participated prominently in several Portuguese films. Her sister Linda Silva also became an actress. Their father died when she was 10. Silva left school at 13 and began working as a seamstress and, later, in a shop.

== Theatrical career ==
At the age of 16, Silva moved to Paris, where she worked for a decade, returning to Portugal in 1963. Following the advice of close friends, who insisted that the theatre was her natural vocation, she decided to stay in the Portuguese capital, Lisbon, making her debut at the Teatro ABC in the play Vamos à Festa (Let's go to the party). Later, she appeared in Gente Nova em Biquini (Young people in bikinis), considered her breakthrough work. As a consequence of this success she became the headline star in her next revue or variety show (known in Portugal as Teatro de Revista), called Chapéu Alta (High Hat). She received the Press Prize for Best Light Theatre Actress in 1966 and, in the same year, the Estevão Amarante Prize, shared with José Viana. By 1973 she was well known and featured in an RTP television programme A Day with . . . Ivone Silva. Although she played other theatrical genres, it was in the humorous variety shows at the theatres in the Parque Mayer theatre district of Lisbon that she thrived. She performed until 1987.

== Cinema and television ==
In cinema, Silva participated in several films including O Destino Marca a Hora (Destiny Sets the Hour - 1969), by Henrique Campos, and A Maluquinha de Arroios (The crazy woman of Arroios - 1970), by the same director. However, she had more impact on television, particularly in the 1981 comedy series Sabadabadu on RTP, written by Nuno Texeira, which won several awards, with Silva and Camilo de Oliveira becoming famous for playing two alcoholics, "Agostinho and Agostinha", who criticised politics and society at the time. A Feira (The Fair - 1978), Ivone Faz Tudo (Ivone does everything - 1979) and Ponto e Vírgula (Full stop and comma - 1984) were also great successes. Silva became famous for several catchphrases, including "with a simple black dress I am never in a bind".

== Death ==
In December 1986, Silva interrupted her work on a variety show at the Teatro Maria Vitória, due to health problems. Her last performance was also in a revue at the Teatro Laura Alves in April 1987, which she left before the end of the run to be admitted to a cancer hospital. She died of breast cancer on 20 November 1987.

== Theatrical performances ==
Year	Piece	Theatre	References
1963	Bikini	Teatro ABC	
1963	Chapéu Alto	Teatro ABC	
1963	Vamos à Festa!	Teatro ABC	
1964	É Regar e Pôr ao Luar	Teatro ABC	
1964	Ai Venham Vê-las	Teatro ABC	
1964	Lábios Pintados	Teatro ABC	
1965	Zona Azul	Teatro ABC	
1965	Dá-lhe Agora!	Teatro ABC	
1966	Tudo à Mostra!	Teatro Maria Vitória	
1966	Mini-Saias	Teatro ABC	
1967	Pois, Pois...	Teatro Variedades	
1967	Mulheres à Vela	Teatro ABC	
1967	Sete Colinas	Teatro ABC	
1969	Elas é Que Sabem	Teatro ABC	
1969	Ena, Já Fala!	Teatro ABC	
1970	Alto Lá Com Elas	Teatro ABC	
1971	Frangas na Grelha	Teatro ABC	
1971	A Senhora Minha Tia	Teatro ABC	
1971	Ó Zé Aperta o Cinto	Teatro Maria Vitória	
1972	Pronto a Despir	Teatro Maria Vitória	
1972-1973	Cá Vamos Pagando e Rindo!	Teatro Maria Vitória	
1973	Ver, Ouvir e Calar	Teatro Maria Vitória	
1974	Ver, Ouvir e Falar	Teatro Maria Vitória	
1974	Uma no Cravo, Outra na Ditadura	Teatro ABC	
1975	P'ra Trás Mija a Burra	Teatro ABC	
1975	Família Até Certo Ponto		
1976	O Bombo da Festa		
1977	Ó da Guarda!	Teatro ABC	
1978	Aldeia da Roupa Suja		
1979	Feliz Natal Avózinha	Teatro da Graça (Grupo Teatro Hoje)	monologue
1979	Que Grande Bronca!	Teatro Laura Alves	
1980	Andorra	Teatro Aberto	
1981	Não Há Nada Pr'a Ninguém	Teatro Maria Vitória	
1982	Sem Rei Nem Rock	Teatro Maria Vitória	
1984	Eu Desço na Próxima, e Você?		
1985	Não Batam Mais no Zézinho	Teatro Maria Vitória	
1986	Isto É Maria Vitória	Teatro Maria Vitória	
1986	Até Pinga no Pão	Tour	
1987	Cá Estão Eles	Teatro Laura Alves	

== Filmography ==
Silva was in four films:

- Estrada da Vida (Road of Life - 1968)
- A Maluquinha de Arroios (The crazy women of Arroios - 1970)
- O Destino Marca a Hora (Destiny Marks the Hour - 1970)
- Auto-retrato, Ivone Silva: "A Faz Tudo" (Self-portrait, Ivone Silva: "A Faz Tudo" - 1979)
