= Fernanda Maria =

Portuguese fado singer and lyricist (1937–2025)

- Born: Fernanda Maria Carvalheda Silva; 6 February 1937; Lisbon, Portugal
- Died: 13 January 2025 (aged 87); Lisbon
- Occupation: Fado singer
- Awards: Gold Merit award from the city of Lisbon

Fernanda Maria Carvalheda Silva (1937–2025), known professionally as Fernanda Maria, was a Portuguese fado singer.

== Early life ==
Maria was born in the Portuguese capital of Lisbon on 6 February 1937. Her father was a typesetter and a good amateur fado performer. At the age of twelve she began working as a waitress at various venues where fado was performed. These included the Parreirinha de Alfama, owned by the fado singer Argentina Santos, where, at the age of 13, Maria began to sing fado. This was a common thing for waitresses in a fado house to do.

== Career ==
Encouraged by patrons of restaurants where she performed, Maria took the audition of the state-run broadcaster, Emissora Nacional, when she was 15 or 16, and was one of those chosen from 100 applicants, staying with the broadcaster for the next five years. She first performed on the radio programme, Serão para Trabalhadores, broadcast by the Voz do Operário (Voice of the Worker) station. Upon obtaining her professional licence in 1957, she began performing in various theatres and performance venues in Lisbon, including the Cineteatro Éden, the Coliseu dos Recreios, the Teatro Capitólio, and the Teatro ABC, while being a regular at fado houses such as A Severa, Toca, Nau Catrineta, and Viela.

She recorded her first records with the Valentim de Carvalho label in the late 1950s, and later with the Alvorada label, issuing more than 80 records in her career, including 20 aimed at the US market, there being a large Portuguese community there. Her work is featured in compilations of the most popular fado songs. Among her most popular songs were Rosa Enjeitada by Raul Ferrão, Zanguei-me com meu amor (I got angry with my love) by Linhares de Barbosa, and Não passe com ela à minha rua (Don't walk with her down my street) by Carlos Conde. Among the guitarists who accompanied her during her career were José Fontes Rocha, Jaime Santos, Joel Pina and Raul Nery.

In 1964, she opened her own fado house, which was frequented by several well-known fado figures, including Cidália Moreira, Manuel de Almeida, Maria da Fé, and Tristão da Silva. In addition to singing fado, she wrote lyrics, including Prédio em Ruína (Ruined building), set to music by Domingos Camarinha and recorded by Ricardo Ribeiro. Maria received several offers to tour overseas, but, apart from one trip to the Netherlands, always declined.

== Awards and recognition ==
In 1963, she won the Bordalo Prize in the Fado category. In the 2006 edition of the Amália Award, given by the Amália Rodrigues Foundation, she received the Women's Career Award. An anthology of her work, consisting of 30 of her hits between 1962 and 1973 was issued by the Movieplay Portuguesa label in 2006. In 2012 she was awarded the Gold Merit Medal of Lisbon Municipality, marking the first anniversary of the inclusion of fado on the UNESCO Intangible Cultural Heritage Lists, for her contribution to the dissemination and preservation of this musical genre in Lisbon.

== Death ==
Fernanda Maria died in Lisbon on 13 January 2025. Her husband, Romão Martins, predeceased her.
