= António Feio =

Portuguese actor (1954–2010)

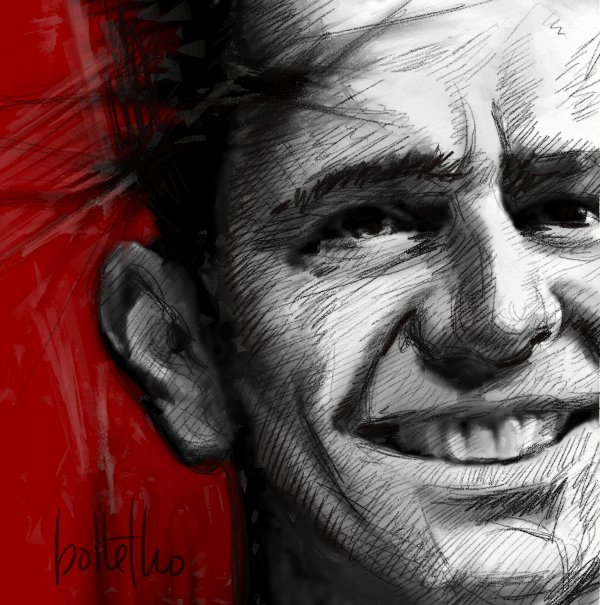
- Born: António Jorge Peres Feio; 6 December 1954; Lourenço Marques, Portuguese Mozambique
- Died: 29 July 2010 (aged 55); Lisbon, Portugal
- Occupations: Actor, voice actor, director
- Years active: 1965–2010
- Children: 4

António Jorge Peres Feio (6 December 1954 – 29 July 2010) was a Portuguese actor and director who was awarded the honorific degree of "Comendador da Ordem do Infante D. Henrique" on 27 March 2010, by Aníbal Cavaco Silva (President of the Republic Portugal).

== Early life and family ==
He lived in Mozambique until the age of seven and settled in Lisbon, with his family. At age eleven, he began his voyage into theater with the play of Miguel Torga, O Mar, directed by Carlos Avilez in the Teatro Experimental de Cascais. Soon after, he began work in television, cinema, and radio ads.

He married Lurdes Feio, a journalist, and they had two daughters, Bárbara Gonzalez Feio and Kiki (Catarina) Gonzalez Feio. Later, Sara Cadima Feio and Filipe Cadima Feio were born, their mother being the actress Cláudia Cadima with whom Feio had had an 18-year relationship.

== Career ==
In 1969, he got his professional actor's license in the theater company, Laura Alves, and went back to Mozambique, touring with the play Comprador de Horas. He then retired from the stage and worked as a designer in an architecture company. In 1974, he was again on the Teatro Experimental de Cascais, where he left to form the Teatro Aquarius with Fernando Gomes. He then began touring the Cooperativa de Comediantes Rafael de Oliveira, Teatro Popular-Companhia Nacional I, under the direction of Ribeirinho, Teatro São Luiz, Teatro Ádóque, Teatro ABC, Casa da Comédia, Teatro Aberto, Teatro Variedades, and Teatro Nacional D. Maria II.

He started directing with the show Pequeno Rebanho Não Desesperes of Christian Giudicelli in the Casa da Comédia. Vincent of Leonard Nimoy, in Teatro Nacional D. Maria II and O Verdadeiro Oeste of Sam Shepard, in Auditório Carlos Paredes were his next plays. As an actor, he partook in Inox-Take 5 (1993) with José Pedro Gomes. This was the start of a partnership that would last throughout his life. He started managing acting courses in the Centro Cultural de Benfica and launched a few groups with his students, such as O Esquerda Baixa and Pano de Ferro.

Besides theater, he was also on TV in sitcoms such as Conversa da Treta or shows such as 1, 2, 3). He was in cinema with Alfredo Tropa, Eduardo Geada, Luís Filipe Costa and Fernando Fragata and also did voice-overs. He kept working on radio with a humorous chronic on TSF.

=== Plays ===
He had many plays, and the most important were A Partilha by Miguel Falabela and O Que diz Molero by Diniz Machado (Teatro Nacional D. Maria II); Perdidos em Yonkers by Neil Simon and Duas Semanas com o Presidente by Mary Morris (CCB and Teatro Nacional S. João); Conversa da Treta by José Fanha (Auditório Carlos Paredes); O Aleijadinho do Corvo by Martin McDonagh (Visões Úteis/ Teatro Rivoli); 'Arte' by Yasmina Reza (Teatro Nacional S. João); Bom Dia Benjamim by Nuno Artur Silva, Luís Miguel Viterbo and Rui Cardoso Martins (CCB and Expo98); Portugal Uma Comédia Musical by Nuno Artur Silva and Nuno Costa Santos (Teatro São Luiz); Popcorn by Ben Elton with Helena Laureano, Deixa-me Rir by Alistair Beaton,Jantar de Idiotas and O Chato by Francis Veber (Teatro Villaret).

== Death ==
He died on 29 July 2010, at 11:30am, in the Hospital da Luz. He was a victim of pancreatic cancer, which he had been fighting for several months.
