= Teatro Variedades, Lisbon =

Defunct theatre in Lisbon, Portugal

Teatro Variedades
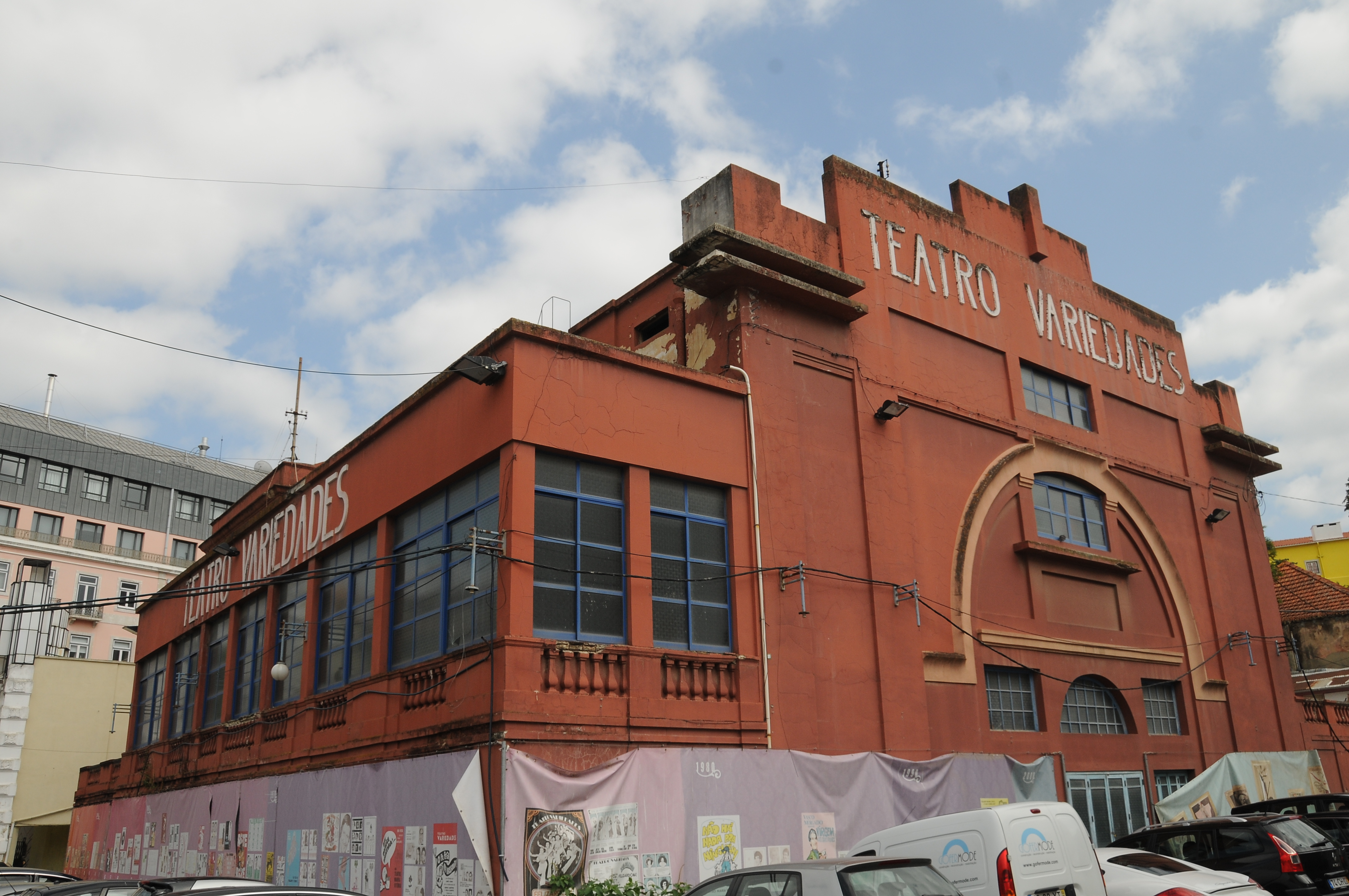
- The former Teatro Variedades in Lisbon
- Interactive map of Teatro Variedades
- Address: Parque Mayer; Lisbon; Portugal
- Coordinates: 38°43′08″N 09°08′46″W

Construction
- Opened: 8 July 1926
- Closed: 1992
- Architect: Urbano de Castro

The Teatro Variedades was a theatre in Lisbon, capital of Portugal, that offered variety or revue shows of the type known in Portugal as Teatro de Revista. Opened in 1926, it has not been used since 1992, but as of 2020 there were active plans to construct a new theatre on the site, incorporating elements of the existing building.

The Teatro Variedades is located in the Parque Mayer in Lisbon, close to the Avenida da Liberdade. It was part of a complex of theatres at the park that included the Teatro Maria Vitória, which was the first to be constructed. Its construction was first considered in 1922 by the entrepreneur Luís Galhardo, and building began two years later, under the direction of the architect Urbano de Castro.

The theatre was inaugurated on 8 July 1926, with a variety show called Pó de Arroz (Rice Powder), with a cast that included Vasco Santana, as the main attraction and Augusto Costa as the compère. There were two shows: one at 21.00 and the other at 22.45. Although the theatre was well-received and the performances were acclaimed by the audience it was not an auspicious opening because the following day it had to close for a day when the Ditadura Nacional (National Dictatorship) overthrew the short-lived presidency of General Manuel de Oliveira Gomes da Costa.

Teatro Variedades produced about five long-running variety shows a year until the 1960s, usually involving two shows a day and three on Sundays. Famous Portuguese performers to perform there include Laura Alves, Palmira Bastos, Beatriz Costa, Irene Isidro, Raul Solnado, and the fado singer Amália Rodrigues. In time there was a falling off in the popularity of such shows, due to the increased popularity of television.

After having been renovated in the early 1960s, the theatre suffered from a fire in 1966, as did other buildings in the park. Some renovation was carried out at the beginning of the 1990s and Teatro Variedades was used for a 26-part RTP (Rádio e Televisão de Portugal) series of variety programmes in 1992, directed by Filipe La Féria, with a range of guest artists who had distinguished themselves in some of the shows at the theatre, in addition to a fixed cast with younger performers. There was a desire to make the theatre return to its former glory but, in fact, these were the last performances it would see.

== See also ==
- List of theatres and auditoriums in Lisbon
