= Zip-Zip =

- Genre: Talk show
- Presented by: Raul Solnado, Fialho Gouveia and Carlos Cruz
- Country of origin: Portugal
- Original language: Portuguese
- No. of seasons: 1
- No. of episodes: 14

Production
- Production locations: Teatro Villaret, Lisbon
- Camera setup: Multi-camera

Original release
- Network: RTP1
- Release: May 26 – December 29, 1969

Zip-Zip was a Portuguese talk show broadcast by RTP presented by Raul Solnado, Fialho Gouveia and Carlos Cruz. It is regarded as milestone for Portuguese television.

== History and format ==
The program emerged in April 1969 per a decision of the then-new RTP president Ramiro Valadão, who suggested the idea of a weekly talk show to the three presenters, after rejecting an initial idea for a daily program.

The first edition was taped on May 24, 1969, and was seen on May 26, with Almada Negreiros as its main guest, obtaining immediate success. It was the first Portuguese talk show, being taped on Saturdays, at Teatro Villaret, in front of a live audience, and was shown on television the following Monday evening.

Major Baptista Rosa abandoned its production team after the first edition, after noting incompatibilities with other members of the team. From the second program, a few modifications had to be made, including in its intro.

Among the members of the live audience was a PIDE agent. The airing of the content had to be negotiated with the Portuguese censorship commission between Saturday (taping day) and Monday (airing day).

José Nuno Martins also collaborated in the program, bringing young talents to the stage.

The last edition was broadcast on December 29, 1969, with the three presenters disguised as old men.

RTP has little footage of the program, due to wiping policies, but still preserves the final episode in full.

The end of the program was criticized by some viewers who saw the program as a means of escape from the society of the time.

On March 27, 1970, the radio program Tempo Zip produced by Organizações Zip-Zip premiered on Rádio Renascença.
