= Teatro Villaret =

Theatre in Lisbon, Portugal

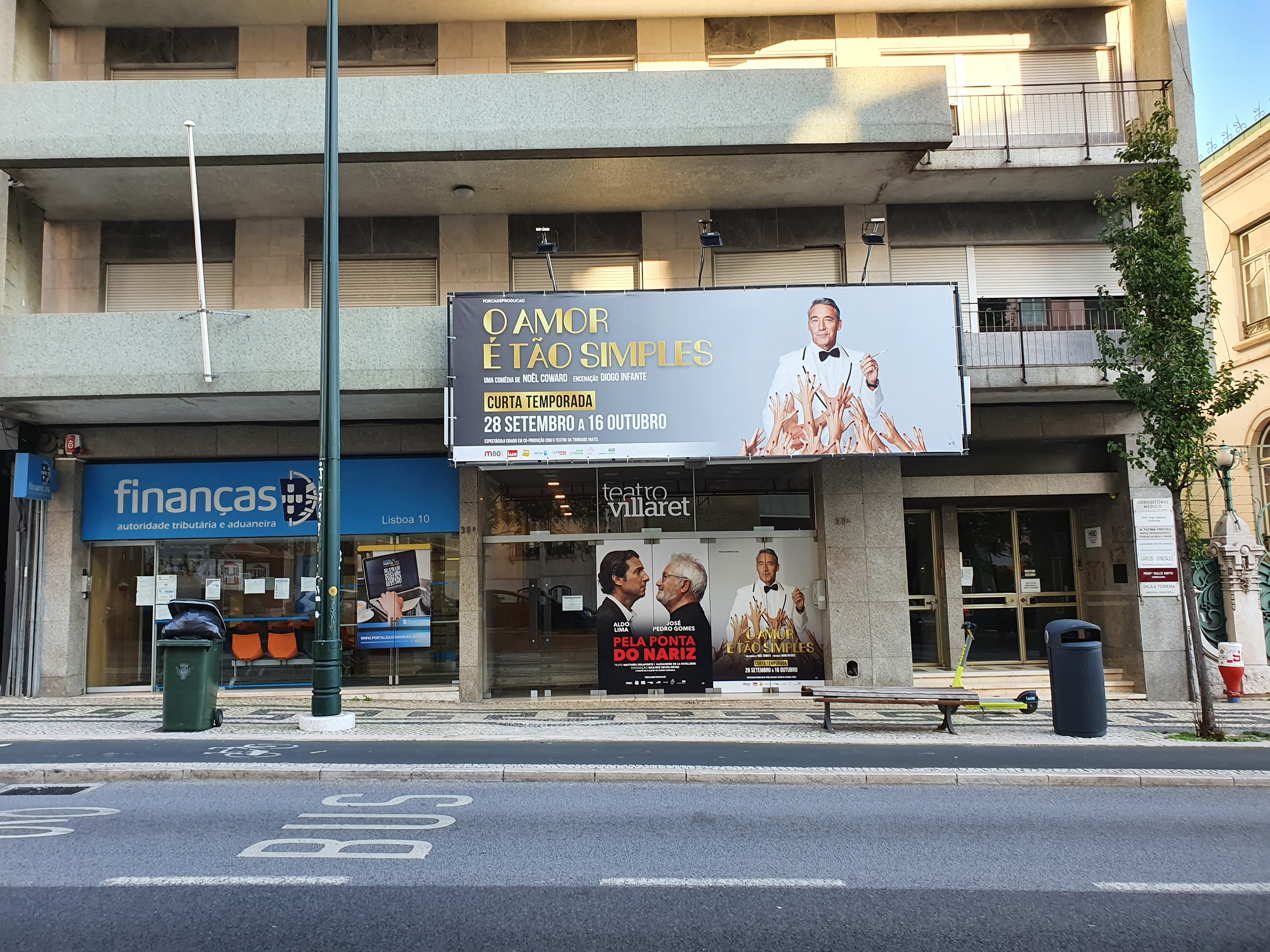
- Interactive map of Teatro Villaret
- Address: Av. Fontes Pereira de Melo, 30, 1050-122, Lisbon; Portugal
- Coordinates: 38°43′49″N 09°08′48.5″W
- Capacity: 351

Construction
- Opened: 1965
- Architects: Maurício Trindade Chagas; Daciano da Costa

The Teatro Villaret is a theatre in Lisbon, the capital of Portugal, that was founded in 1964. Because of its relatively small size, it is said to have been the first so-called "pocket theatre" in Portugal.

== History ==
The theatre was the idea of the Portuguese actor comedian, Raul Solnado. After a long search he identified a space that had originally been built as an underground garage for an 8-floor building located on Avenida Fontes Pereira de Melo, a major road in Lisbon. Founded in 1964, the theatre was named by Solnado in homage to the actor João Villaret. Solnado had established a company called Teatros de Bolso (pocket theatres) to develop the space and the architectural work was carried out by Maurício Trindade Chagas, with decoration by Daciano da Costa. Building a new theatre at this time can be considered to have been a risky venture, given the popularity of cinemas, the many existing theatres in Lisbon, and the gradual expansion of television in Portugal, which was only introduced in 1957.

In 1965, the Portuguese Comedians Company was created, bringing together a group of actors including Eunice Muñoz and José de Castro. The theatre was inaugurated in 1965 with a musical adaptation by the company of Nikolai Gogol's satirical The Government Inspector, given the name of Impostor Geral (General Imposter) for the purposes of the musical. The following performances tended to alternate comedies and serious dramas, which included Jean Anouilh's Antigone. In addition to the main shows, the Teatro do Nosso Tempo (Theatre of Our Time) company presented early evening performances made notable by the return to performing of actress Maria Barroso, after sixteen years of absence from the stage. As the wife of Mário Soares, Barroso would go on to become First Lady of Portugal when Soares became president.

In 1969 the Villaret stage was transformed into a television studio for the RTP show Zip-Zip, starring Solnado with Fialho Gouveia and Carlos Cruz. In the 1970s the management was taken over by the theatrical director Artur Ramos. It later passed into the hands of the impresario Vasco Morgado. For several years it remained a popular Lisbon performance venue, regularly hosting productions by António Feio and others. After restoration work, which, for safety reasons, reduced the capacity from 440 to 384 seats, the Villaret reopened in 2008, managed by the D. Maria II National Theatre. The first performance was of Fat Pig by Neil LaBute. It subsequently established itself as a venue with eclectic programming and a clear focus on attracting a wide range of audiences, including youth and children. It is currently managed by the company, Força de Produção, with a capacity of 347 seats and four places for wheelchair users.

== See also ==
- List of theatres and auditoriums in Lisbon
