= Teatro Maria Vitória =

Theatre in Lisbon, Portugal

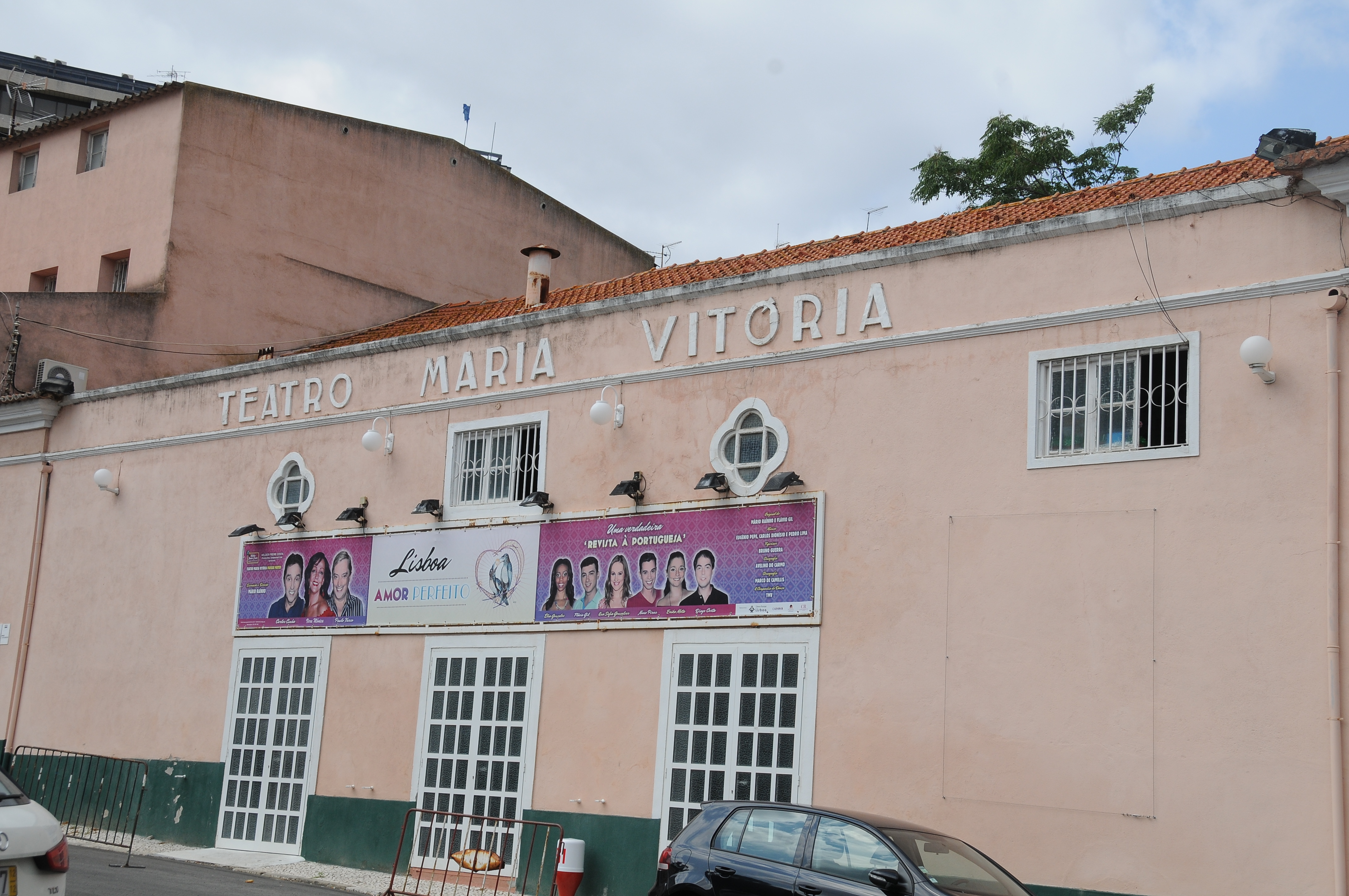
- Teatro Maria Vitória in 2014
- Interactive map of Teatro Maria Vitória
- Address: Parque Mayer, 1250-164; Lisbon; Portugal
- Coordinates: 38°43′09.6″N 09°08′47″W

Construction
- Opened: 1 July 1922; reopened after a fire, 1990

The Teatro Maria Vitória is a theatre in Lisbon, capital of Portugal. It is located in the theatre district of Parque Mayer.

Dedicated primarily to revues, which are known in Portugal as Teatro de Revista, the Teatro Maria Vitória opened on 1 July 1922 in the Parque Mayer (Mayer Park) district of Lisbon, which was at one time known as the “Broadway” of Lisbon. The theatre was named in honour of a fado singer, Maria Vitória, who had died at a young age in 1915. It started life as a wooden building. The playwrights, Ernesto Rodrigues, Félix Bermudes and João Bastos, played an important role in the theatre's early performances, working under the pseudonym of the “Troianos”. It was the first of the four theatres in the area, the others being the Teatro Variedades and the Teatro Capitólio, which both still exist, and the Teatro ABC, which was demolished in 2015. Teatro Maria Vitória suffered a fire on 10 May 1986, which destroyed the entire building and contents, forcing the performing company to temporarily transfer to the Teatro Maria Matos.

In 1940, the fado singer Amália Rodrigues made her debut as an actress at the Maria Vitória. Shows also featured international attractions, such as the Brazilian Bibi Ferreira, who drew large crowds to the theatre. The 1960s were particularly fruitful, with the Portuguese actor Raul Solnado starring in two shows that would mark his career: A guerra de 1908 (The war of 1908) and História da minha vida (The story of my life). After the Carnation Revolution of 25 April 1974, which overthrew the Estado Novo dictatorship, the theatre quickly changed the name of the revue being performed from "See, listen ... and shut up" to "See, hear ... and speak", assuming a turning point had been reached in the creative freedom and expression for theatrical writers.

For much of its life the theatre has been used by the impresario, Hélder Freire Costa, who celebrated 50 years of promoting shows at the Maria Vitória in 2014. It was Costa who, together with Vasco Morgado Júnior, was responsible for rebuilding the theatre after the 1986 fire, with the reopening taking place in 1990. Until the COVID-19 pandemic, when it closed its doors temporarily in 2020, the Maria Vitória was the only theatre in Lisbon still presenting revues on a regular basis. This is despite the fact that Costa has stated that it is too small to be profitable for revues that require a large cast.

== See also ==
- List of theatres and auditoriums in Lisbon
