= List of theatres and auditoriums in Lisbon =

There follows a list of present and past theatres and auditoriums in the Portuguese capital of Lisbon.

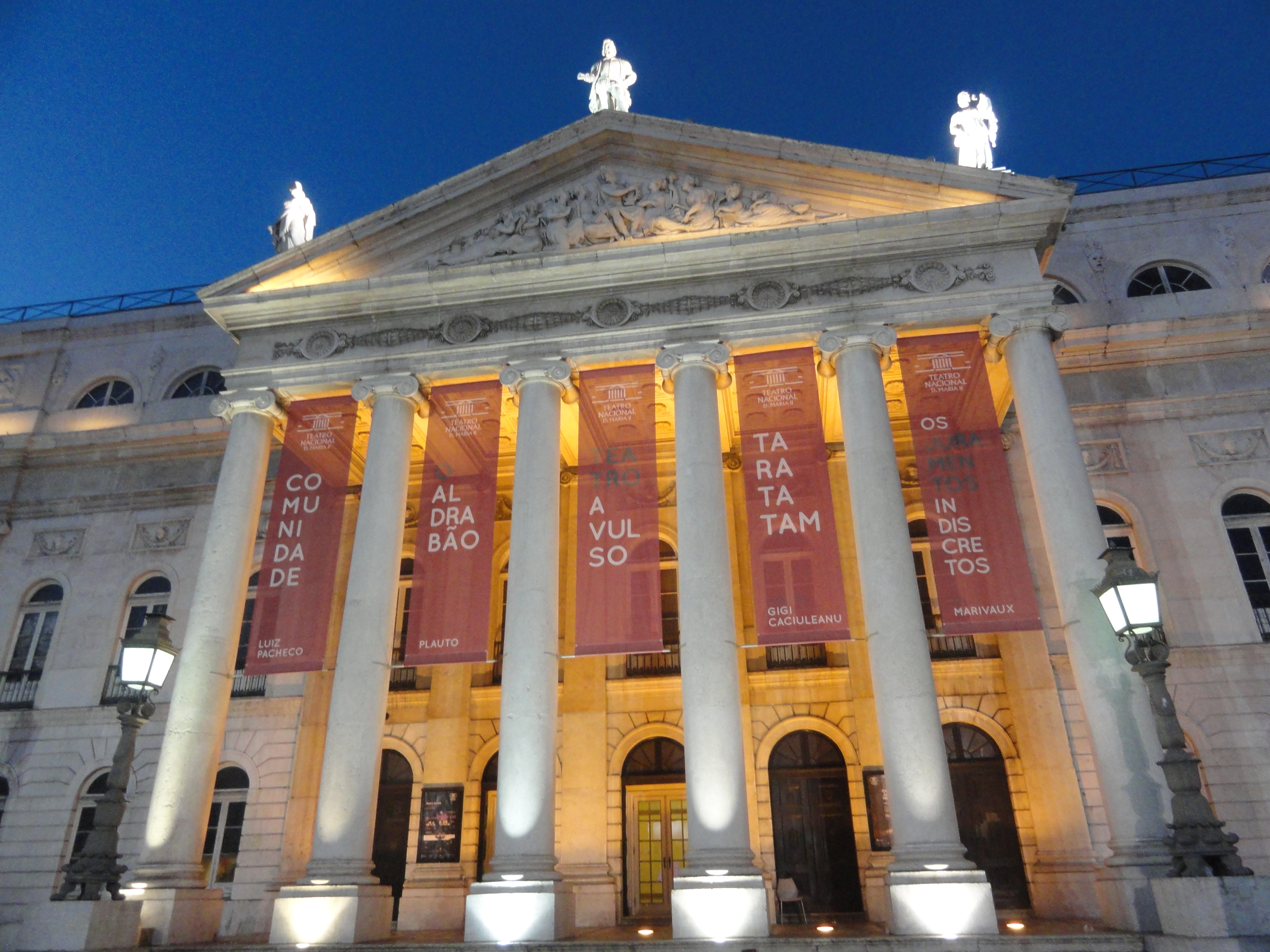
D. Maria II National Theatre

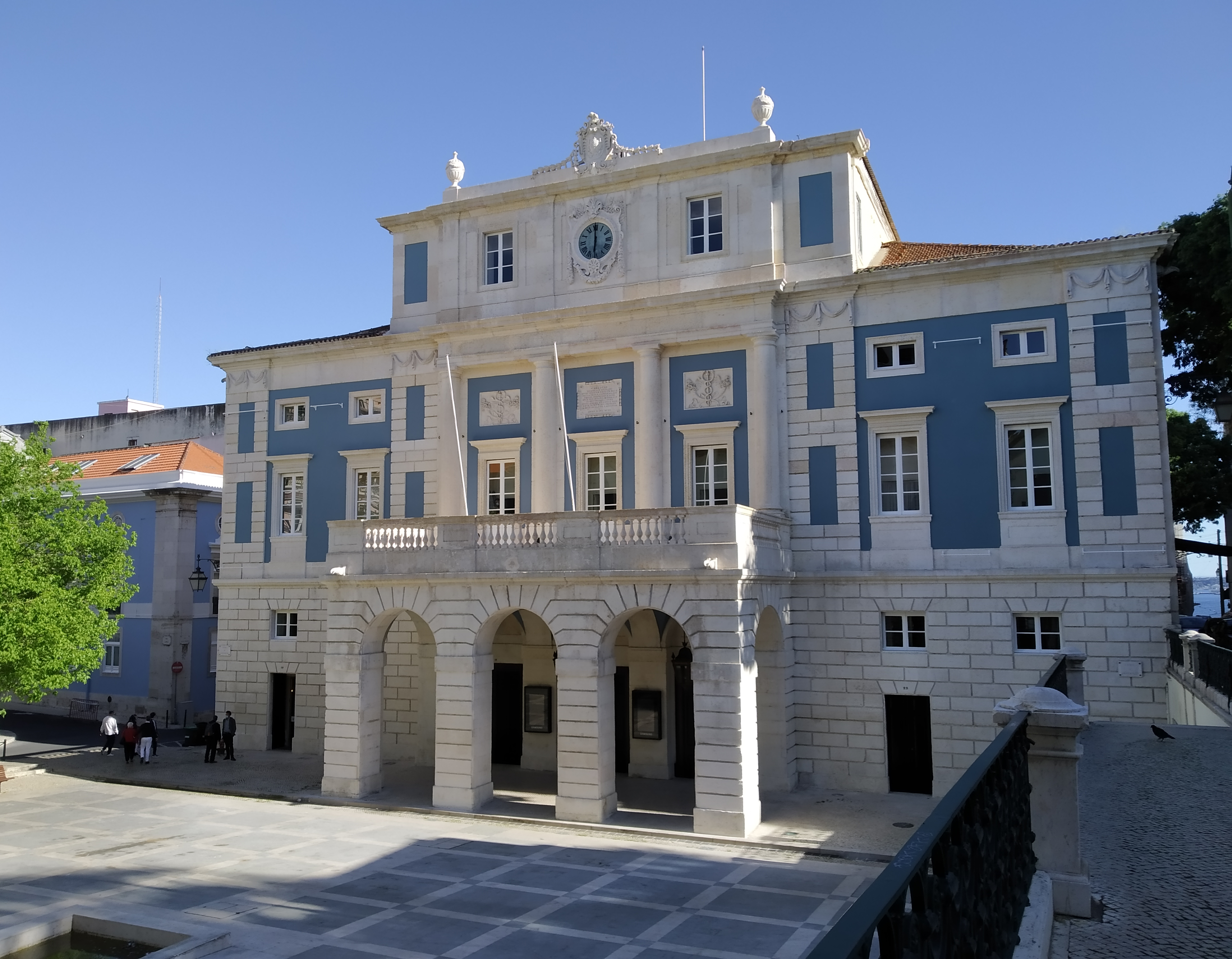
Teatro Nacional de São Carlos

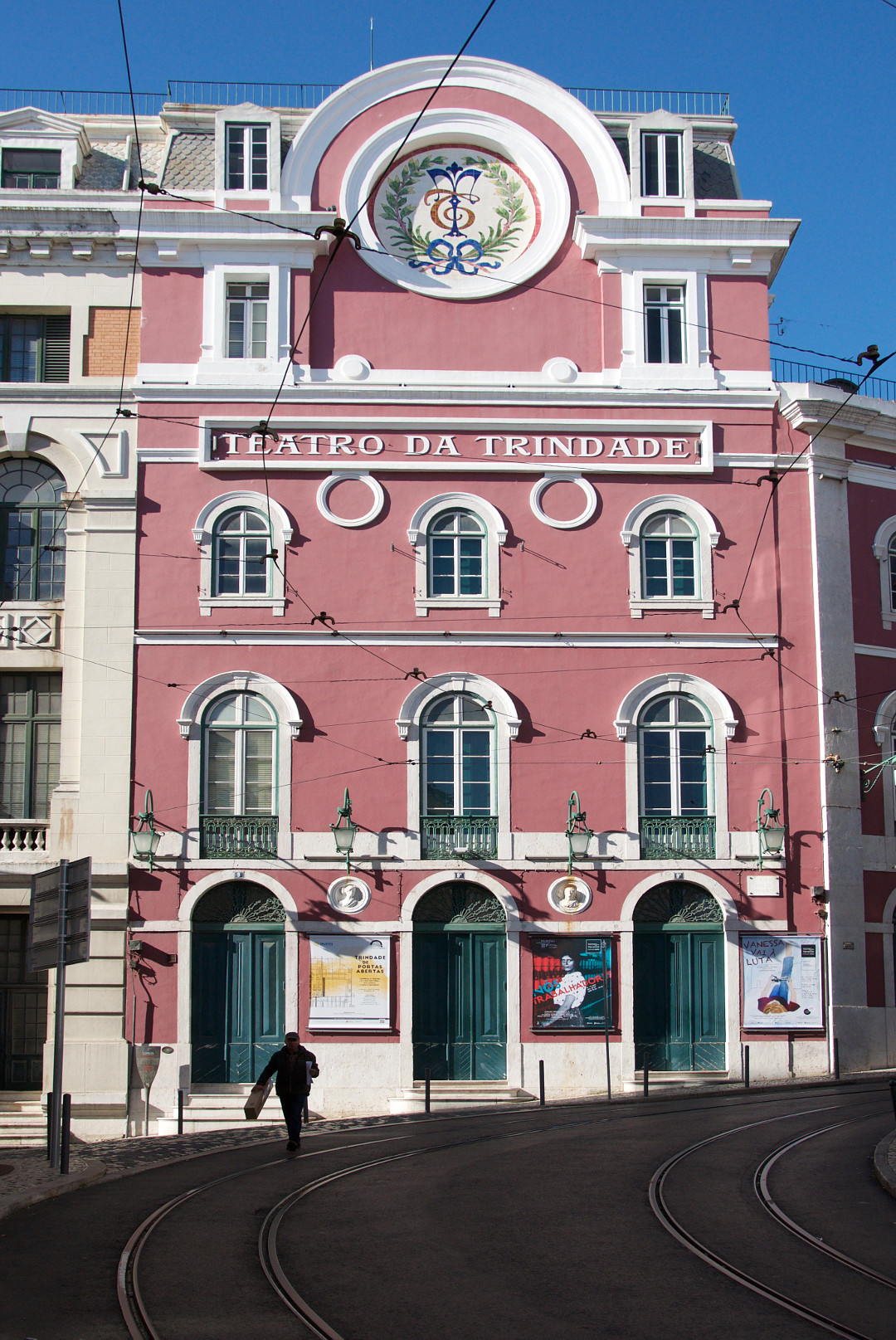
Trindade Theatre in 2017

- Teatro Aberto is a modern theatre that, among other things, hosts the annual Grande Prémio de Teatro Português, which aims to encourage Portuguese playwrights.
- Teatro ABC was the last of four theatres built in the Parque Mayer theatre district of Lisbon. It opened in January 1956 and closed in 1995.
- Teatro Ádóque was a theatrical cooperative located in the Martim Moniz area of Lisbon. Established in 1974, it used a portable theatre dating back to 1936. The cooperative closed in 1982.
- Teatro Apolo took its name in 1910 following the overthrow of the Portuguese monarchy, having previously been the Teatro do Príncipe Real. It was demolished in 1957.
- Teatro Avenida was a theatre located on the Avenida da Liberdade. It operated from 1888 to 13 December 1967, when it was completely destroyed by fire.
- The Belém Cultural Center Performing Arts Centre has a Grand Auditorium with 1429 seats and a Small Auditorium with 348 seats.
- Theatre Camões is a concert hall situated in the Parque das Nações area. The building was constructed in 1997 for the International World Exhibition Expo 98, designed by Manuel Salgado. It has been used by the Lisbon Symphony Orchestra and the National Ballet of Portugal.
- Teatro Capitólio is located in Parque Mayer. It was opened in 1931. Because of its early modernist design it has been recognized as the first building of the modern movement in Portugal. Suffering from water damage, the theatre was closed in the 1980s and only reopened in November 2016 after extensive restoration
- Coliseu dos Recreios (also known as Coliseu de Lisboa) is a multi-purpose auditorium with a capacity of up to 4000.
- Cineteatro Éden is a defunct theatre, now a hotel, known for its Art Deco architecture.
- Teatro D. Fernando was a theatre in the downtown Lisbon Baixa area between 1849 and 1860.
- Teatro do Ginásio was a theatre built in 1845 that mainly concentrated on performances of comedy shows. Damaged by fire in 1921, it reopened in 1925. It closed in 1952 and was rebuilt, although the façade has been preserved.
- The Gulbenkian Foundation has a Grand Auditorium with 1228 seats at the Foundations’ headquarters. It is used by the Gulbenkian Orchestra and other performers.
- Cinema Império had 1,676 seats. Opened in 1952 it closed in 1983 and since 1992 has been used as a place of worship.
- Teatro Laura Alves. Formerly the Cinema Rex, the building was taken over in 1968 by Vasco Morgado, who named it after his wife. It closed in 1987 and the building burnt down in 2012.
- Teatro Maria Matos is a municipal theatre located in the parish of Alvalade. It was inaugurated in 1969.
- D. Maria II National Theatre is located on the Rossio square. Constructed between 1842 and 1846 to a neoclassical design, it was damaged by fire in 1964 and only reopened in 1978. It is one of Portugal's leading theatres.
- Maria Vitória Theatre is a small theatre in the theatre district of Parque Mayer, which mainly offers revues. It is where, in 1940, the fado singer, Amália Rodrigues made her debut as an actress.
- Cine-Teatro Monumental was a large theatre and cinema that opened in 1951 and closed in 1984.
- Ópera do Tejo was a luxurious opera house that was inaugurated on 31 March 1755, and destroyed by the 1755 Lisbon earthquake on 1 November of the same year.
- Teatro Politeama was opened in 1913, close to the Coliseu dos Recreios. It has over 2000 seats and mainly offers light entertainment.
- Teatro da Rua dos Condes was opened in 1738 and rebuilt after the 1755 Lisbon earthquake. It was demolished and rebuilt in 1888 and eventually converted to a cinema. For part of its life it was one of Lisbon's major theatres.
- Teatro do Salitre was one of the first theatres in Lisbon. It opened on 27 November 1782, changed its name to Teatro de Variedades in 1858, and was demolished in 1879. For much of its existence it was one of the two leading theatres in the city.
- Teatro Nacional de São Carlos is an opera house. It was opened on 30 June 1793 by Queen Maria I as a replacement for the Ópera do Tejo.
- Teatro São Luiz is a theatre located in the Chiado district of Lisbon. It opened on 22 May 1894. The theatre was purchased by Lisbon City Council in 1971 and underwent major remodelling, beginning in 1998.
- Teatro da Trindade is in the Chiado neighbourhood. Built in the 19th century, it is one of the oldest theatres in Lisbon still in operation.
- Teatro Tivoli is on the Avenida da Liberdade. When it was opened in 1924 it was considered to be the best theatre in Portugal.
- Teatro Variedades was a theatre in the Parque Mayer theatre district. It offered variety shows of the type known in Portugal as Teatro de Revista. Opened in 1926, it has not been used since 1992, but as of 2020 there were plans to construct a new theatre on the site, incorporating elements of the existing building.
- Teatro Villaret is a small, modern theatre with 347 seats, constructed in a former underground garage.
