= Luís Cristino da Silva =

Portuguese architect (1896–1976)

Luís Ribeiro Carvalhosa Cristino da Silva
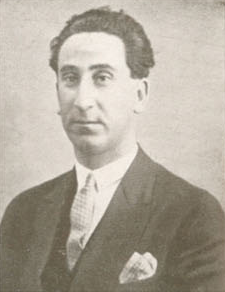
- Cristino da Silva in 1933
- Born: 21 May 1896; Lisbon, Portugal
- Died: 31 October 1976 (aged 81); Lisbon
- Education: École des Beaux Arts, Paris
- Occupation: Architect
- Years active: 1929–1966
- Spouse: Frimeta Rosenfarb
- Awards: Military Order of Saint James of the Sword (1941); Valmor Prize (1944); Order of Public Instruction (1957); Order of Prince Henry (1961)
- Projects: Portuguese World Exhibition; University of Coimbra;

Luís Ribeiro Carvalhosa Cristino da Silva (1896–1976) was a Portuguese architect and professor of architecture at the Lisbon School of Fine Arts. He made an important contribution to establishing the standards of official architecture during the authoritarian Estado Novo regime. He contributed to the Portuguese World Exhibition (1940); designed the urban complex of Praça do Areeiro in Lisbon (1938–1943); and, from 1948 onwards, was the chief architect for the expansion and reconstruction of the University City of Coimbra.

== Early life ==
Cristino da Silva was born in Santa Isabel, Lisbon on 21 May 1896, the son and grandson of painters: his grandfather was the Romantic painter João Cristino da Silva (1820–1877); his father was the painter João Ribeiro Cristino da Silva (1858–1948), a professor and author of the work Estética citadina (City Aesthetics). His mother was Maria Antónia Augusta de Almeida Carvalhosa e Silva, a native of Alenquer. Graduating from the Lisbon School of Fine Arts in 1919, he went to Rome and carried out archaeological research. He then studied in Paris on a scholarship at the École des Beaux Arts between 1920 and 1925, studying under the architects Léon Azéma and Victor Laloux, before returning to settle in Lisbon. On 31 July 1930, he married Frimeta Rosenfarb, a Pole from Łódź, who was a domestic worker.

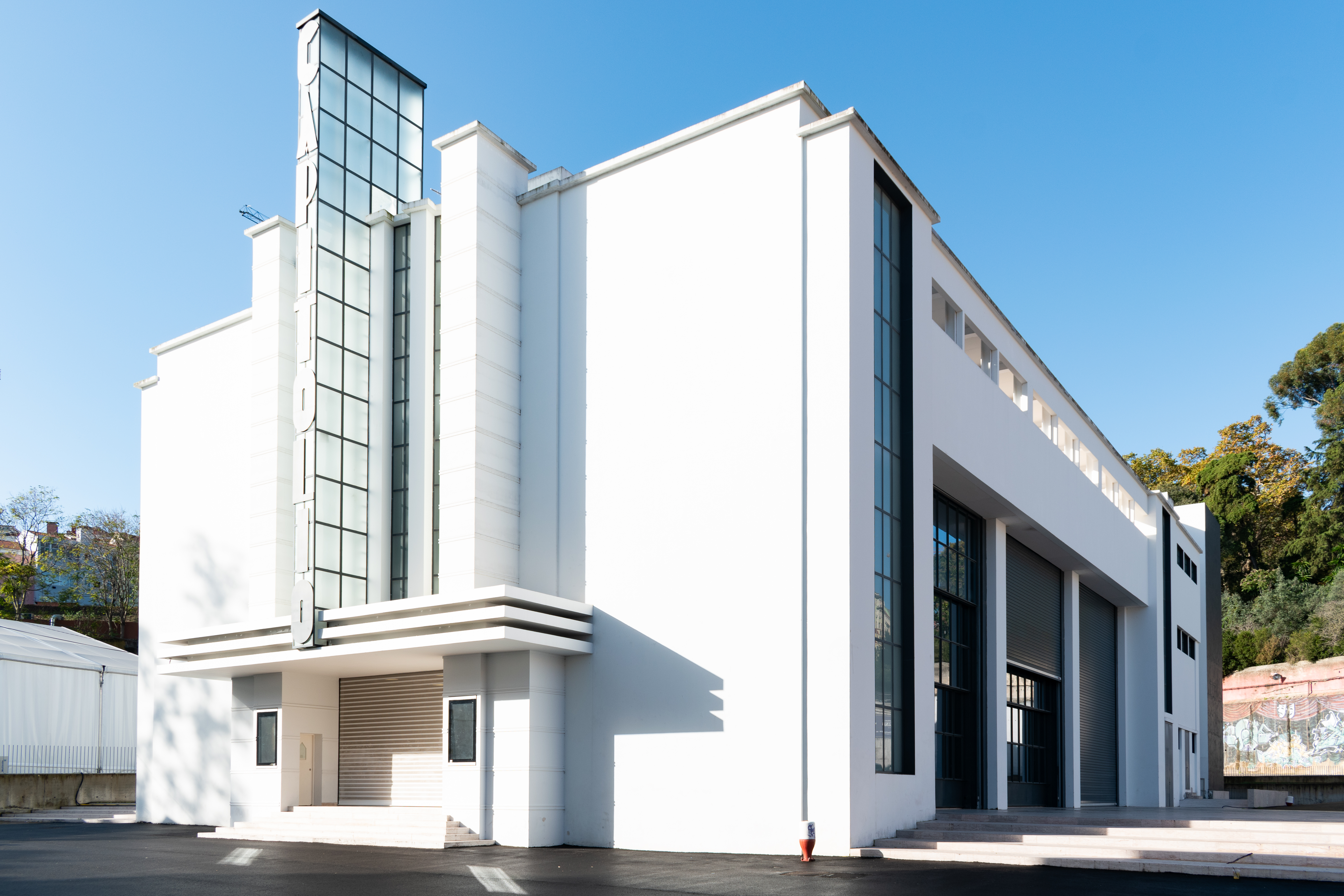
The Cineteatro Capitólio

== Early career ==
Cristino da Silva became responsible for designing some of the most notable and, in some cases, controversial buildings in Portugal from the 1920s to the 1960s, together with other pioneers of the modern architecture movement in Portuguese architecture, such as Porfírio Pardal Monteiro, Cottinelli Telmo, Cassiano Branco, Carlos Ramos, and Jorge Segurado. In 1925, he designed the Cineteatro Capitólio, the first building in Portugal to explore the aesthetic potential of concrete, which had an Art Deco façade. Today, it is considered an architectural landmark of early Portuguese modernism, although it underwent profound changes over the years, completely distorting Cristino da Silva's design. Extensive restoration work, carried out in the 21st century by Alberto Souza Oliveira, restored the theatre to its original appearance. The Capitólio is situated in the Parque Mayer theatre district and in 1931 Cristino da Silva designed a monumental entrance to that area. From 1927 onwards, he collaborated with the Lisbon City Council on urban studies. In 1930 he presented proposals for an extension of Lisbon's Avenida da Liberdade at the "Exhibition of Independents" of the National Society of Fine Arts, but these were never implemented. The area is now the Edward VII Park, designed by another modernist architect, Francisco Keil do Amaral. In 1933, he became professor of architecture at the Lisbon School of Fine Arts.

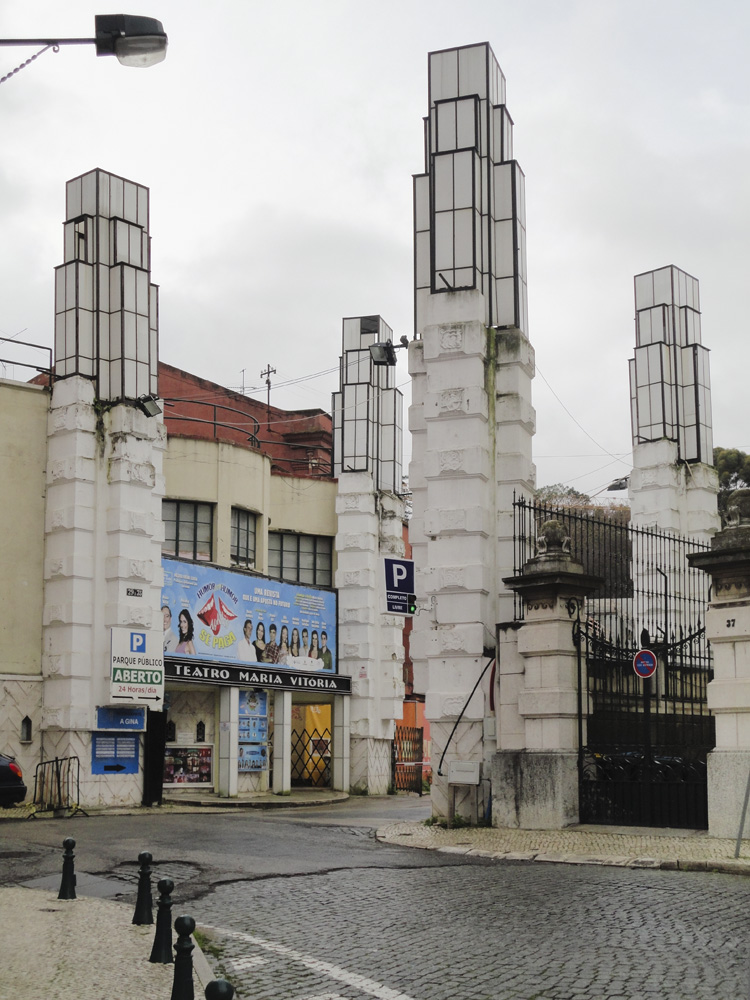
Parque Mayer entrance

== Later career ==
From the late 1930s, Cristino da Silva's architectural style changed to conform more with the monumentalism required by Portugal's dictatorship, which echoed the architecture of Nazi Germany. He developed large projects, including for the 1940 Portuguese World Exhibition in Belém near Lisbon. At this exhibition two large pavilions were built at right angles to the Jerónimos Monastery and the sea. One was the "Pavilion of the Portuguese in the World", designed by Cottinelli Telmo and the other was the "Pavilion of Honour and Lisbon", designed by Cristino da Silva. Neither have survived. He was also responsible for the Rosa-dos-Ventos (compass rose), situated in front of the Monument of the Discoveries, which used different types of limestone, including lioz, a rare type of beige limestone found only in Sintra near Lisbon. It included a Mappa mundi showing the routes of Portuguese vessels during the Age of Discovery. Cristino da Silva also designed the Praça do Areeiro (Areeiro Square) in Lisbon and branches of the Caixa Geral de Depósitos bank in Guarda, Castelo Branco and Leiria, as well as collaborating with Telmo on the new buildings of the University of Coimbra, which involved the demolition of numerous existing buildings. In 1953 he designed a monument commemorating the late minister of public works, Duarte Pacheco, in Loulé.

== Awards and honours ==
Cristino da Silva received the Medal of Honour from the National Society of Fine Arts in 1943, the Valmor Prize and the Lisbon Municipal Architecture Prize in 1944, and the National Art Prize from the National Secretariat of Information, the Estado Novo's propaganda arm, in 1961. In 1941, he was made Commander of the Military Order of Saint James of the Sword; in 1957 he was made Commander of the Order of Public Instruction; and in 1961 he was made Commander of the Order of Prince Henry.

== Death ==
Cristino da Silva died in Lisbon on 31 October 1976.

In his honour, the street Rua Luís Cristino da Silva, in Marvila, Lisbon, was named after him. Retrospectives of his work have been held by the Calouste Gulbenkian Foundation in 1998 and in Oeiras in 2025.

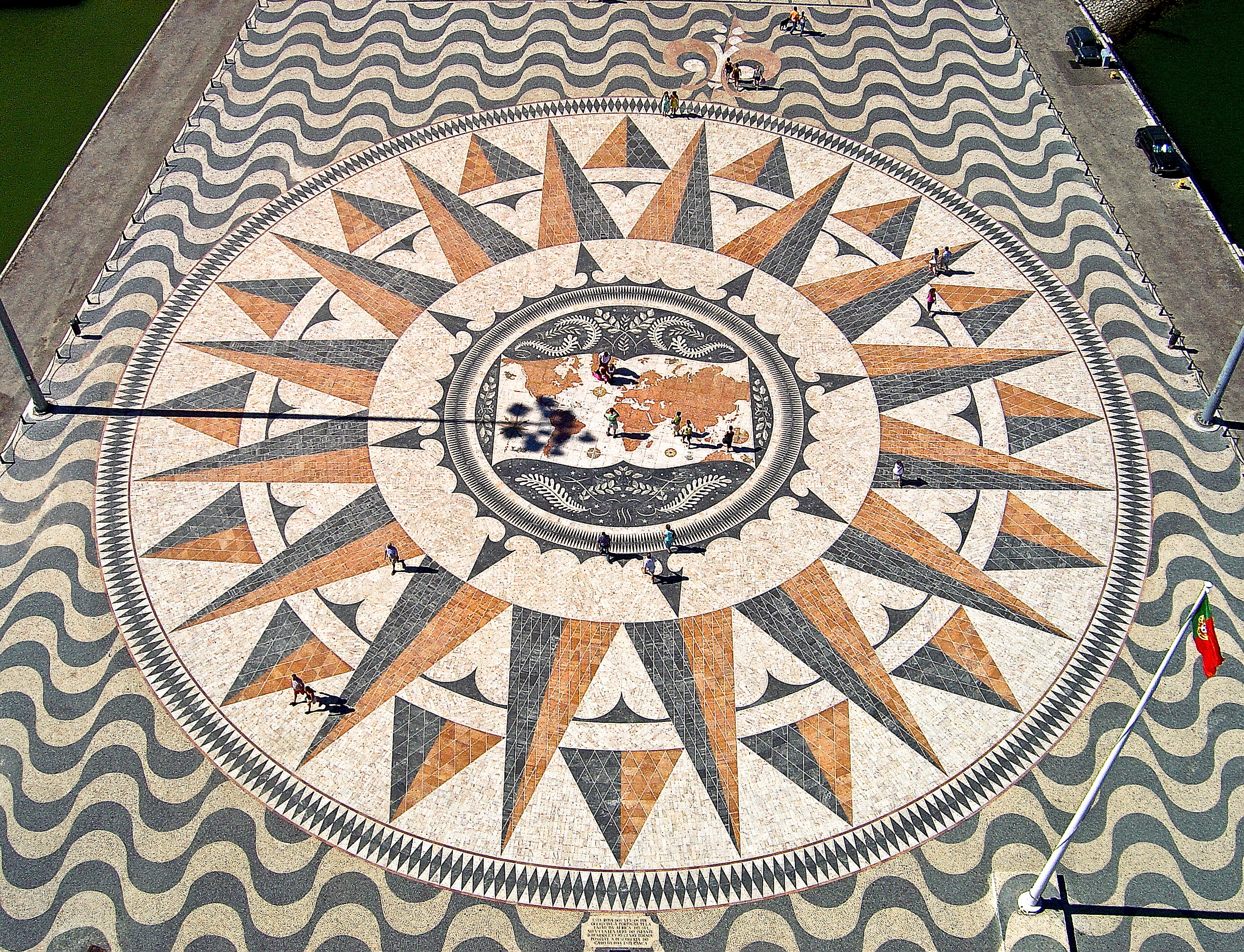
The Compass Rose in front of the Monument of the Discoveries

== Major works ==
Cristino da Silva's work included:

- 1929 – Cineteatro Capitólio (construction 1930–36).
- 1931 – Entrance to Parque Mayer, Lisbon.
- 1933 – Vivenda Florida, Fundão.
- 1934 – Diogo de Gouveia National High School, Beja (currently Diogo de Gouveia Secondary School, Beja).
- 1938–1943 – Branches of the Caixa Geral de Depósitos, in Guarda, Castelo Branco, and Leiria.
- 1940 – "Pavilion of Honour and Lisbon Pavilion" and the Compass Rose at the Portuguese World Exhibition.
- 1941–1960 – Areeiro Square (currently Francisco Sá Carneiro Square), Lisbon.
- 1944 – House at 67 Avenida Pedro Álvares Cabral, Lisbon (Winner of the Valmor Prize).
- 1945–76 – Service building, Restauradores Square, Lisbon.
- 1949–1966 – Chief Architect of the University City of Coimbra.
- 1953 – Monument commemorating Duarte Pacheco, Loulé (with Leopoldo de Almeida).
