= Carlos Quintas =

Portuguese actor and singer

Carlos Miguel Quintas Martins (born 9 April 1951 in Faro) is a Portuguese stage and television actor and singer.

Carlos Quintas turned professional in 1975. Having an acting career simultaneously with being a singer until 1982, he then devoted himself exclusively to the theater.

Quintas has appeared in more than 50 plays by many different authors and styles. He worked at Portugal's Teatro Nacional D. Maria II and is noted for his appearances in musicals such as Godspell, Annie, A Severa, Amalia, My Fair Lady, The Sound of Music, and West Side Story.

He has also appeared in soap operas and sitcoms for the Portuguese TV, including A Visita da Cornélia, E O Resto são Cantigas, A Festa de Sábado á Noite, A Festa Continua, Piano Bar, 1,2,3, Sabadabadu, Noite de Reis and Roda da Sorte. In late 2009, he played the role of Armando del Carlo in the musical La Cage aux Folles by Filipe la Feria, in Teatro Rivoli in Porto.
