= Sabadabadu =

- Genre: Comedy, Entertainment
- Created by: César Oliveira
- Written by: Nuno Teixeira
- Starring: Ivone Silva and Camilo de Oliveira
- Theme music composer: João Henrique
- Country of origin: Portugal
- Original language: Portuguese
- No. of seasons: 1
- No. of episodes: 7

Production
- Producer: Radiotelevisão Portuguesa (RTP)
- Running time: 60 minutes

Original release
- Network: Televisão Independente
- Release: 1981 – 1981

Sabadabadu was a 1981 Portuguese comedy television series. It lasted for one season and was produced by Radiotelevisão Portuguesa (RTP) . Each episode lasted 60 minutes.

Sabadabadu starred actors such as Camilo de Oliveira, Ivone Silva, Victor De Sousa, Manuela Queiroz and Carlos Quintas.
