= Casino Lisboa (Portugal) =

Casino in Lisbon, Portugal

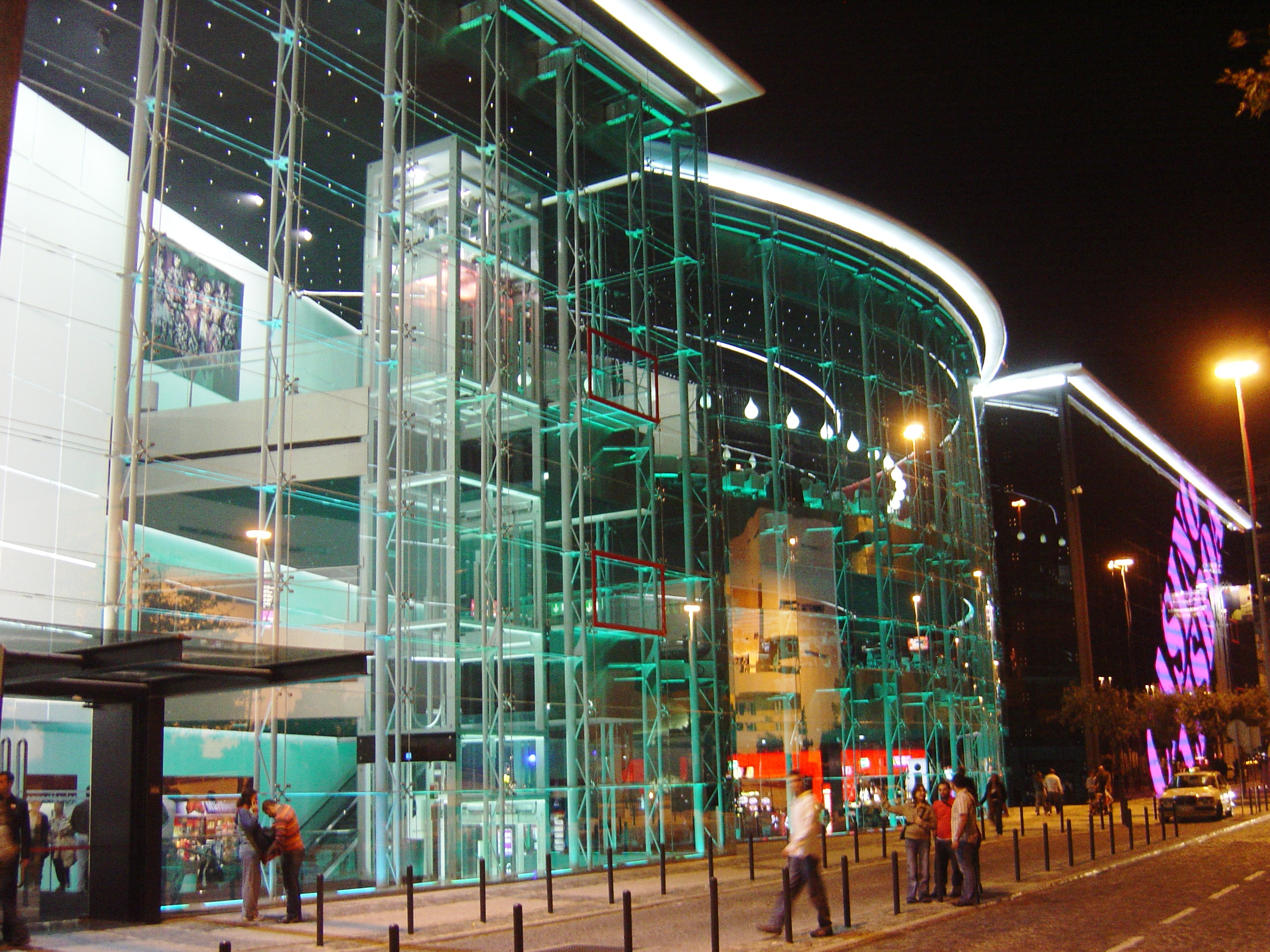
- Casino Lisboa
- Interactive map of Casino Lisboa
- Opening date: April 19, 2006
- Theme: Lisbon
- Casino type: Land
- Owner: Sociedade de Turismo e Diversões de Macau
- Architect: Stanley Ho, Teddy Yip, Yip Hon and Henry Fok
- Website: Official website

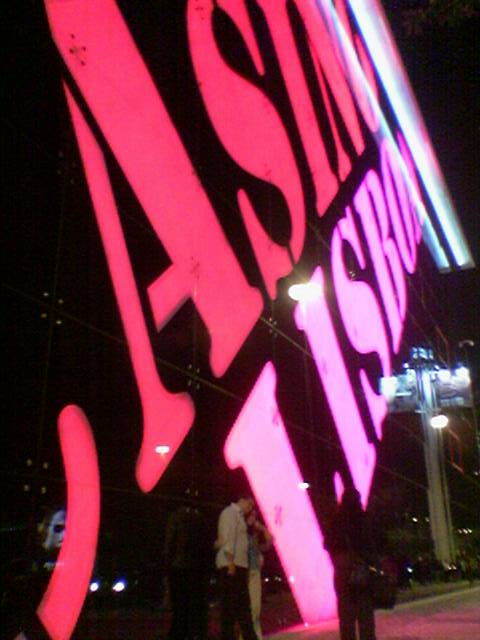
Main façade

Casino Lisboa (lit. 'Lisbon Casino') is a casino located at Parque das Nações (Park of the Nations) in the city of Lisbon, Portugal. It was inaugurated and opened to the public on April 19, 2006.

The casino, at the time of opening, had around 700 slot machines (expandable to 1,000), 22 gaming tables, 4 bars, 3 restaurants and a theater seating 600.

Casino Lisboa is owned by Estoril-Sol, a company majority-owned by Hong Kong-Macau gambling king Stanley Ho until his death in 2020, with a minority shareholder with 33%, Amorim. Stanley Ho also owned the same-name Casino Lisboa in Macau, the last Portuguese colony in the country. Amorim is a Portuguese conglomerate, with two other casino concessions in Portugal (Figueira da Foz and Tróia).

The CEO of Estoril-Sol is Mário Assis Ferreira.

== Controversies ==
=== Location ===
The casino has been plagued by controversy since it was green-lighted around 2001–2002 by Pedro Santana Lopes, the Lisbon Mayor. The casino was conceived as a way to fund the rebuilding of Parque Mayer, Lisbon's decadent theater district. The fact that it was to be the first casino in the country inside a major urban center (instead of a tourist area) stirred up many negative reactions claiming the casino would create gambling problems, as it would facilitate access of a younger population to games of chance by bringing the games closer to the people.

The projected location within the city itself was publicly changed several times after "definitive" announcements by the Mayor. Withdrawn locations, in succession, were Parque Mayer itself (a project by Frank Gehry that was already underway was suspended), Cais do Sodré, Jardim do Tobacco, and Feira Popular, before finally settling on Parque das Nações.

=== Concession ===
All gambling in Portugal is subject to a concession by the State. For that purpose, the country is divided in gaming zones, each having its own concessionary with usually a single casino. The Lisbon Casino falls within the Estoril gaming zone, and as such, was assigned to the concessionary of that zone. However, other gaming concessionaries protested that since it was a new casino, a new gaming zone should be established and an application process for the concession should be opened. Estoril-Sol and the Portuguese Government argued that, despite usually only one casino by gaming zone being allowed, nothing in the law prevented each zone from having more than one – in fact, the Algarve gaming zone set up a precedent, having three casinos.

== Location ==
The casino took up the former Pavilhão do Futuro (Pavilion of the Future), one of the main attractions of the World Expo of '98, which was extensively rebuilt for its new purpose under a project by architect Fernando Jorge Correia. The original architects for the Pavilion (Ana Paula Lopes dos Santos, Miguel Ferreira Guedes de Carvalho and Rui Jorge Garcia Ramos) obtained an injunction to halt construction work on the grounds of copyright violation (due to changes in the façade and in the structure of the building). A superior court overruled the claim, but the construction work was still halted from January to April 2005.

== Business ==
=== Early figures ===
The casino was built at a cost of €108.9 million, including a €30 million concession fee for a 15-year period.

In its initial months of operation in 2006, Casino Lisboa reported visitor numbers and revenues above initial expectations. Management stated that attendance exceeded projected daily figures, and total revenues reached €30.2 million within the first five months.

The target annual turnover was set at €70 million. Under the terms of the concession, approximately 50% of gross gaming revenue reverted to the State, while the operator was exempt from standard corporate income taxation.

Inclusive of multiple casino properties, the management company Estoril Sol reported €80.6 million in net revenue for 2021.

=== Effects on Estoril Casino ===
Workers at Estoril Casino went on strike in January 2005, expressing concern that the opening of Casino Lisboa would reduce client numbers and threaten their job security. Estoril-Sol stated that if revenues declined due to the new casino within 36 months, workforce reductions could occur under a company agreement.

The company had announced a projected 20% decline in the revenue of the old casino. That decline was announced to have been just 0.9% in the first month, and 15% after five months.
