= Carlos Cruz (television presenter) =

Portuguese journalist and talk show host

- Born: 24 March 1942 (age 83); Torres Novas, Portugal
- Occupation: TV presenter

Carlos Pereira Cruz (born 24 March 1942 in Torres Novas) is a Portuguese former radio and television journalist and talk-show host whose career ended after his involvement and criminal conviction in relation to the Casa Pia child sexual abuse scandal.

== Biography ==
Carlos Cruz was born in 1942 in Torres Novas. At the age of four he migrated to the Portuguese territory of Angola where, at 14, he started work as a sports reporter at the Emissora Católica de Angola and the Rádio Clube de Angola radio stations. Back in Lisbon, he attended the Instituto Superior Técnico where he enrolled in the electrical engineering program, but dropped out and started a professional career in Portuguese television and radio. Throughout his career in the Portuguese media he worked for the Emissora Nacional (now fully owned by RTP), RTP, Rádio Comercial and SIC.

Among his best-known television shows were Zip-Zip (RTP), with Raul Solnado and Fialho Gouveia; 1-2-3 (RTP); O Preço Certo (RTP) and Noites Marcianas (SIC). In 1990, he founded the television production company CCA (Carlos Cruz Audiovisuais), but the project went bankrupt. Cruz was the spokesperson of a successful Portuguese bid submitted to host and organize the UEFA Euro 2004. In 2002, the President of Portugal Jorge Sampaio awarded him the Order of Infante D. Henrique. In 2004, The Guardian wrote that Cruz was "Portugal's most famous media personality", and in 2010, The Daily Herald "once Portugal's most popular television presenters" [sic].

In October 2011, in an interview with the magazine Público, he announced his imminent return to television on the real estate-focused cable channel House TV, but it never materialized.

== Paedophilia scandal ==
After a successful career, interrupted by a cancer operation, he was arrested in 2003 and accused of paedophile offences in the Casa Pia child sexual abuse scandal. In 2004, as an arguido ("formal suspect") involved in the trial, Cruz published a book of personal reflections, Preso 374. He was convicted on 3 September 2010, and sentenced to seven years in prison, but he was free pending appeals until 2013.

Because of the sentence, Cruz lost his recognition as part of the Order of Infante D. Henrique.
