= Teatro Maria Matos =

Maria Matos
- Teatro Maria Matos
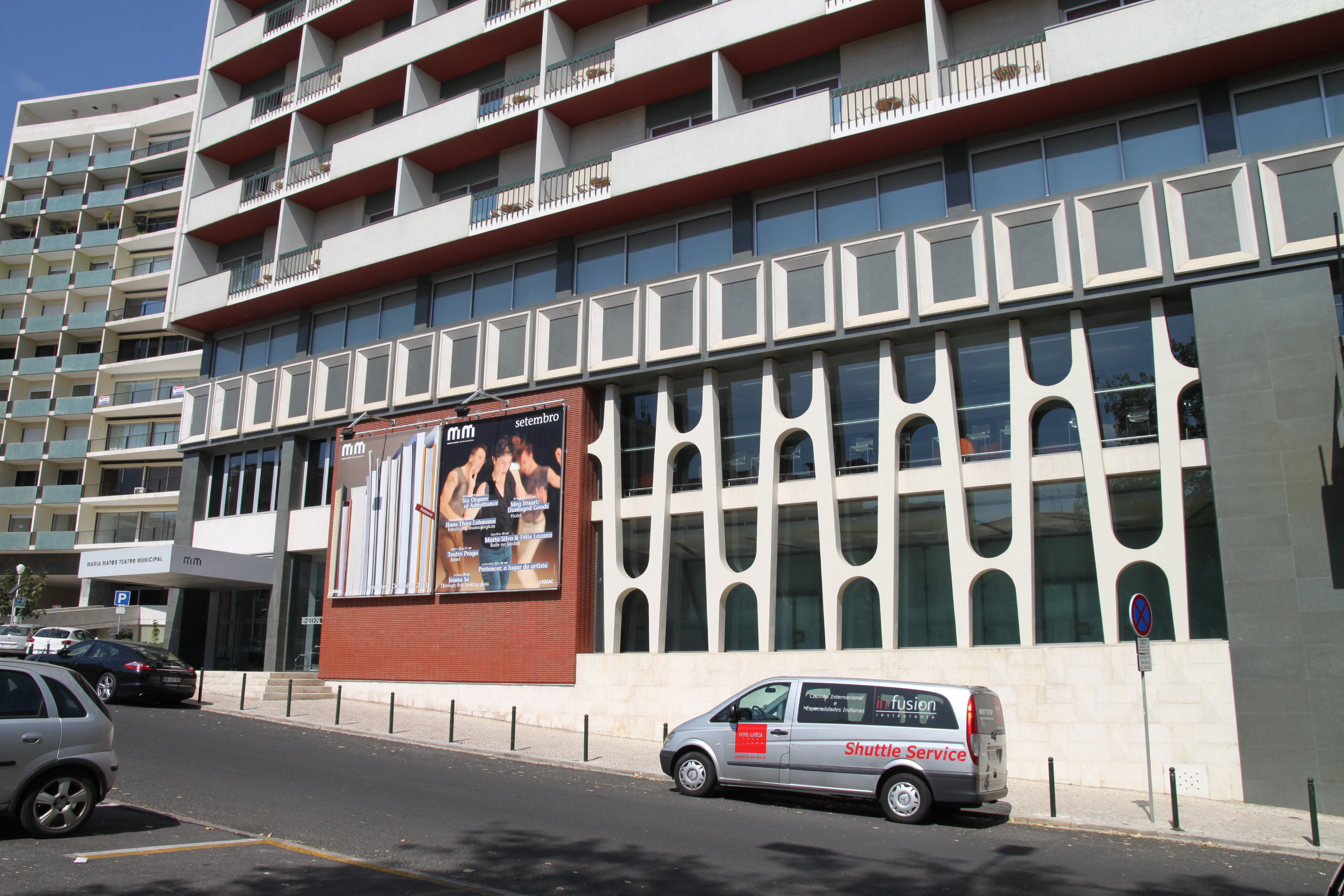
- The lateral facade of the hotel/cultural centre Teatro Maria Matos
- Interactive map of the Maria Matos area

General information
- Type: Theatre
- Architectural style: Modernist
- Location: Alvalade, Lisbon, Portugal
- Coordinates: 38°44′45″N 9°08′20″W
- Opened: 20th century
- Owner: Portuguese Republic

Technical details
- Material: Granite

Design and construction
- Architect: Aníbal Barros de Fonseca

Website
- Teatro Maria Matos

The Maria Matos Theatre (Portuguese: Teatro Maria Matos) is a theatre located in the civil parish of Alvalade, in the municipality and Portuguese capital of Lisbon.

== History ==
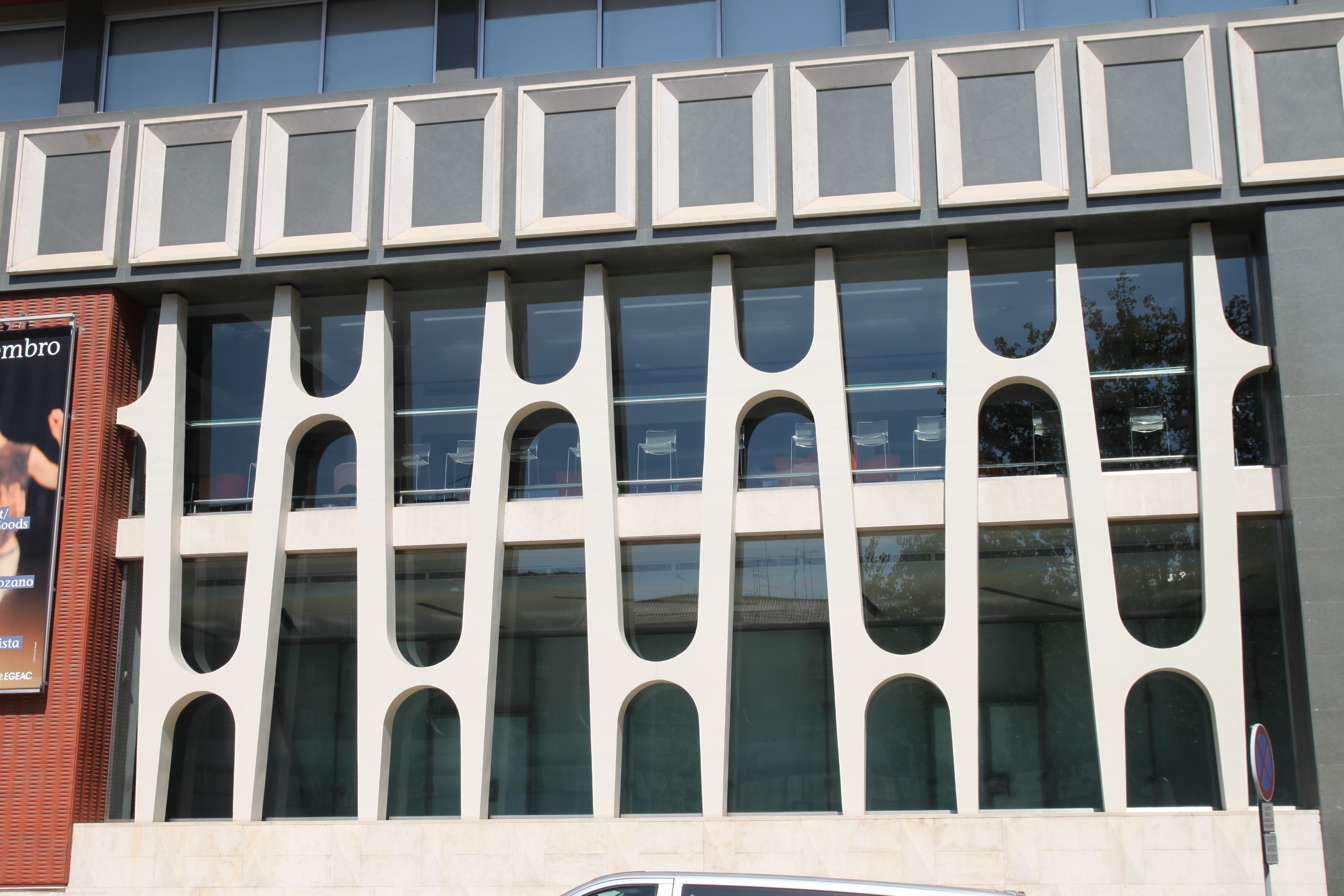
The emblematic facade of the theatre

Originally, the building was designed by the architect Fernando Ramalho. The construction of the theatre occurred between 1963 and 1969, a project authored by architect Barros da Fonseca; a bold architectural project for the time, the site consisted of a fifteen-story building, that integrated a hotel, a theater and a cinema. The theatre Maria Matos was inaugurated on 22 October 1969, under the direction of its artistic director Igrejas Caeiro, presenting the piece Tombo no Inferno, by Aquilino Ribeiro in honor of an actress of great prestige, Maria Matos. On its stage passed, during the 1970s and early 1980s, various companies, namely the theatrical company of RDP (Portuguese: Companhia de Teatro da RDP) under the direction of artistic director Artur Ramos, and the Portuguese Cooperative Theatre Repertory (Portuguese: Repertório–Cooperativa Portuguesa de Teatro) under its director Armando Cortez.

On 24 September 1982, the theatre was acquired by the municipal council of Lisbon, resulting in the loss of its resident company and passing to the regime of independent theatre companies and those smaller groups involved in theatre, dance and music.

In 2003, the management of Maria Matos was passed to the municipal company EGEAC Empresa de Gestão de Equipamentos e Animação Cultural (Company for the Management of Equipment and Cultural Animation).

Due to its state of degradation, in August 2004, renovations and interventions began at the site to remodel the cultural spaces conferring on the theatre a new identity with better conditions for events. The project included the remodelling of the main hall and backstage, improved acoustics, illumination, climate control, reinforcing security measures and removing architectural barriers in the interior.

The Municipal Theatre Maria Matos reopened to the public on 27 March 2006. The sophisticated and modern re-design improved capacity to 447 seats, added a lounge, café and rehearsal hall. After its reopening, its director Diogo Infante made the theatre one of its principal halls in the city of Lisbon, putting in place a regular program based on theatrical performances, co-productions of various performing arts festivals and cinema in Lisbon.

Between 2008 and 2018, the director was Mark Deputter, which signalled a transformation of the theatre's profile, becoming vocational performances of a contemporary nature. The musical Cabaret, a Broadway success that led to the film Cabaret, was the highlight of the theatre program for 2008, and debuted on September 4, 2008. Simultaneously, there was an emphasis on national creators who lacked a cultural space or fixed location. In addition there was an move toward various experimental events, a regular musical program, the strengthening of education projects and the integration of a multi-purpose theology in artistic development. After September 2018, the Municipal Theatre began a new historical phase, where the spaces were rented by private cultural groups with an impact public: comedy, drama and theatrical music.

== Events ==
The theatre was repurposed for contemporary events and co-produces spectacles in theatre, dance, concerts and projects for children and young people. The venture works with artists and independent companies to co-produce festivals (FIMFA, Alkantara Festival, Festival de Almada and Temps d'Images), with presentations of thematic events in conjunction with Lisbon institutions, such as the Fundação Calouste Gulbenkian.

== See also ==
- Theater in Portugal
- List of theatres and auditoriums in Lisbon
