= Teatro Ádóque =

Theatre and theatre company in Lisbon, Portugal

- Address: Largo Martim Moniz; Lisbon; Portugal
- Capacity: 700

Construction
- Opened: Structure: 1936; Theatre company: 1974
- Closed: 1982

Teatro Ádóque was a theatre and theatrical cooperative located in the Martim Moniz area of Lisbon, capital of Portugal.

== Origins ==
The Ádóque Theatre Workers' Cooperative, was founded in 1974, and installed itself in the former Teatro Desmontável Rafael de Oliveira in Largo Martim Moniz in Lisbon, a collapsible structure dating back to 1936, which could be moved, initially by rail and, later, in ten trucks. The structure had room for 700 people seated on narrow canvas chairs. The cooperative's first performance was on September 23, 1974. The facilities were not good, and in the early years there were leaks in the roof, leading spectators to open umbrellas during performances. The roof was made of galvanized iron sheets, causing the theatre to be extremely hot in the summer.

== Performers ==
This was the first theatrical cooperative in Portugal. Its founders included the actor, author and director, Francisco Nicholson, the set designer, Mário Alberto, and the choreographer, Fernando Lima. The company became famous in Lisbon for its innovative and left-wing approach to revues, known in Portugal as Teatro de Revista, and for children's shows. One of its introductions was the use of ballet, with modern choreography. Actors and dancers to perform as members of the cooperative included António Montez, Ermelinda Duarte, António Feio, Natália de Sousa, Henriqueta Maia, Rui Mendes, Maria Dulce, and Maria Tavares. The theatre was forced to close in 1982 by Lisbon's mayor, Krus Abecassis, who wanted a shopping centre to be built at the location.

== Performances ==
The Ádóque cooperative produced 21 shows, which were attended by more than 1.2 million spectators in Lisbon and more than 70 other locations in the country. In Lisbon it would perform two shows every night and three shows on Sundays. In addition to the shows put on by the cooperative, the theatre was used by many other cultural and artistic groups, touring shows, and visual artists.

== An irreverent approach ==
Teatro Ádóque was established soon after the April 1974 Carnation Revolution, which overthrew the Estado Novo dictatorship in Portugal. The cooperative was able to take advantage of the end of censorship that occurred at that time and became recognised for its different approach to the presentation of revues. According to Francisco Nicholson, "we were irreverent, shameless, impertinent, naughty, but always fraternal, generous, …... Always with the concern to be politically very incorrect".

== See also ==
- List of theatres and auditoriums in Lisbon
