= Cineteatro Éden =

Defunct cinema in Lisbon, Portugal

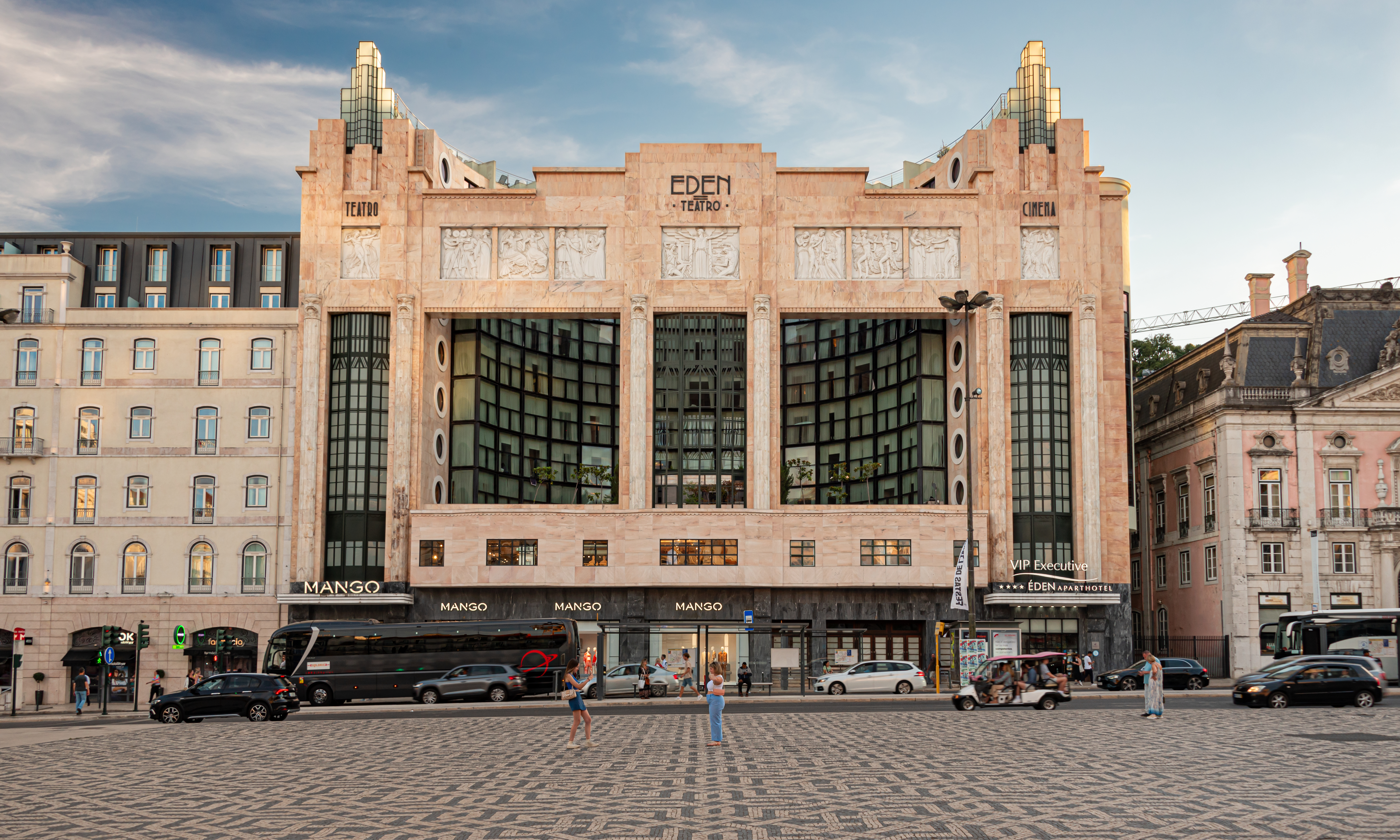
- Interactive map of Cineteatro Éden
- Address: Praça dos Restauradores; Lisbon; Portugal
- Coordinates: 38°42′55″N 09°08′31″W
- Capacity: Theatre 2000; cinema 1440

Construction
- Opened: 25 September 1914 (re-opened 1937)
- Closed: 1989
- Architect: Cassiano Branco

The Cineteatro Éden is a building located in Restauradores Square in the Portuguese capital of Lisbon. Designed by the architect Cassiano Branco, it is one of the best-known examples of Art Deco architecture in Portugal. The building is now a hotel and only the façade is original.

== Background ==
In 1899, Ferdinand "Fernando" Baerlein, a German industrialist who headed the Empreza Industrial Portugueza (Portuguese Industrial Company), invited French engineer Albert Beauvalet to direct the design and production of a Portuguese-manufactured automobile. After his attempts to make the automobile profitable through mass production were unsuccessful, due to a lack of machinery and skilled labour, Beauvalet decided, in 1902, to create his own business and rented the former stables of the Palácio da Foz in Restauradores Square in downtown Lisbon. These buildings, known for being covered by an imposing iron and glass structure, had been the site of the defunct Grandiosa Galeria Universal Parisiense (Grand Parisian Universal Gallery). Beauvalet set up the Agence Général d'Automobiles store, known as the "Garage," as well as Lisbon's first music hall, albeit in a makeshift format. Four years later, he commissioned extensive renovations and the space became the main representative of the Peugeot brand in Portugal. The opening of the new store was attended by King Carlos I and Armand Peugeot, founder of the eponymous brand.

== Éden Theatre ==
In 1909, Beauvalet moved his automobile dealership to one of the stores in the Hotel Avenida Palace, replacing it and the rest of the renovated building with the "Recreios Music-Hall". In 1913, taking advantage of the renovations carried out on the old stables by its tenants over the years, the owner, José Rodrigues de Sucena, 2nd Count of Sucena, asked the architect Guilherme Edmundo Gomes to create a more imposing and spacious performance hall. The new theatre, located on the first floor, with stalls, balconies and boxes and a capacity for over 2,000 spectators, was inaugurated on 25 September 1914, opening to the public with the operetta "The Mayor’s Donkey", by Gervásio Lobato and João da Câmara, performed by Palmira Bastos among others. Featuring a terrace, a café-concert, a restaurant, and additional rooms for various events, as well as several stores on the ground floor, the theatre quickly became one of Lisbon's most appreciated cultural spaces, hosting numerous musical and theatrical successes, and even film premieres.

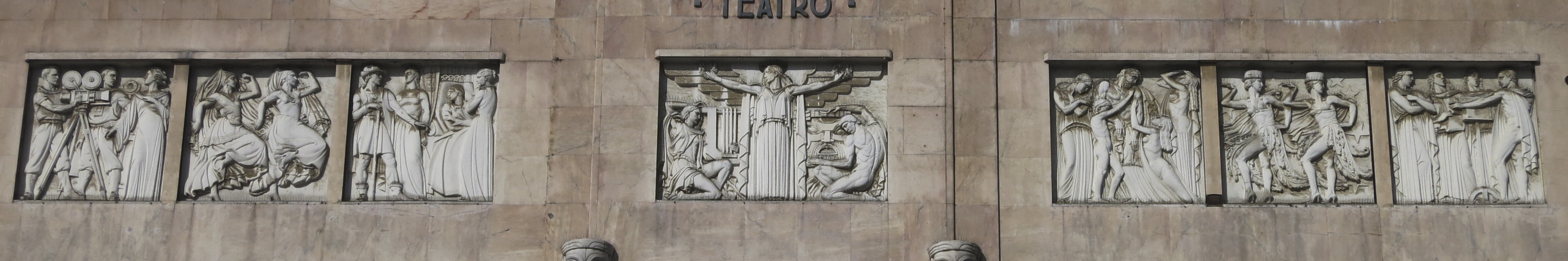
Bas-relief, c. 1934, by Leopoldo de Almeida

== The new theatre ==
In 1928, an official inspection of the building detected several anomalies and dangerous breaches of safety regulations, forcing its owner to close the theatre until these were resolved. He took the opportunity to rebuild the site and, after two earlier proposals, a final design proposal was submitted to Lisbon City Council in 1933. The basic Art Deco design was by Cassiano Branco, but he later withdrew from the process following a creative dispute with the owner, leaving its completion in the hands of Carlos Florêncio Dias. Among those who contributed to the theatre was the sculptor Leopoldo de Almeida, who was responsible for the bas-reliefs on the façade. Construction employed 400 workers and lasted for several years. Several changes were made to Branco's design until completion in 1937. The "New Éden Theatre" was inaugurated on 1 April 1937, with a total capacity of 1,440 spectators. The opening ceremony was attended by the president, Óscar Carmona, and involved the presentation of the operetta Bocage.

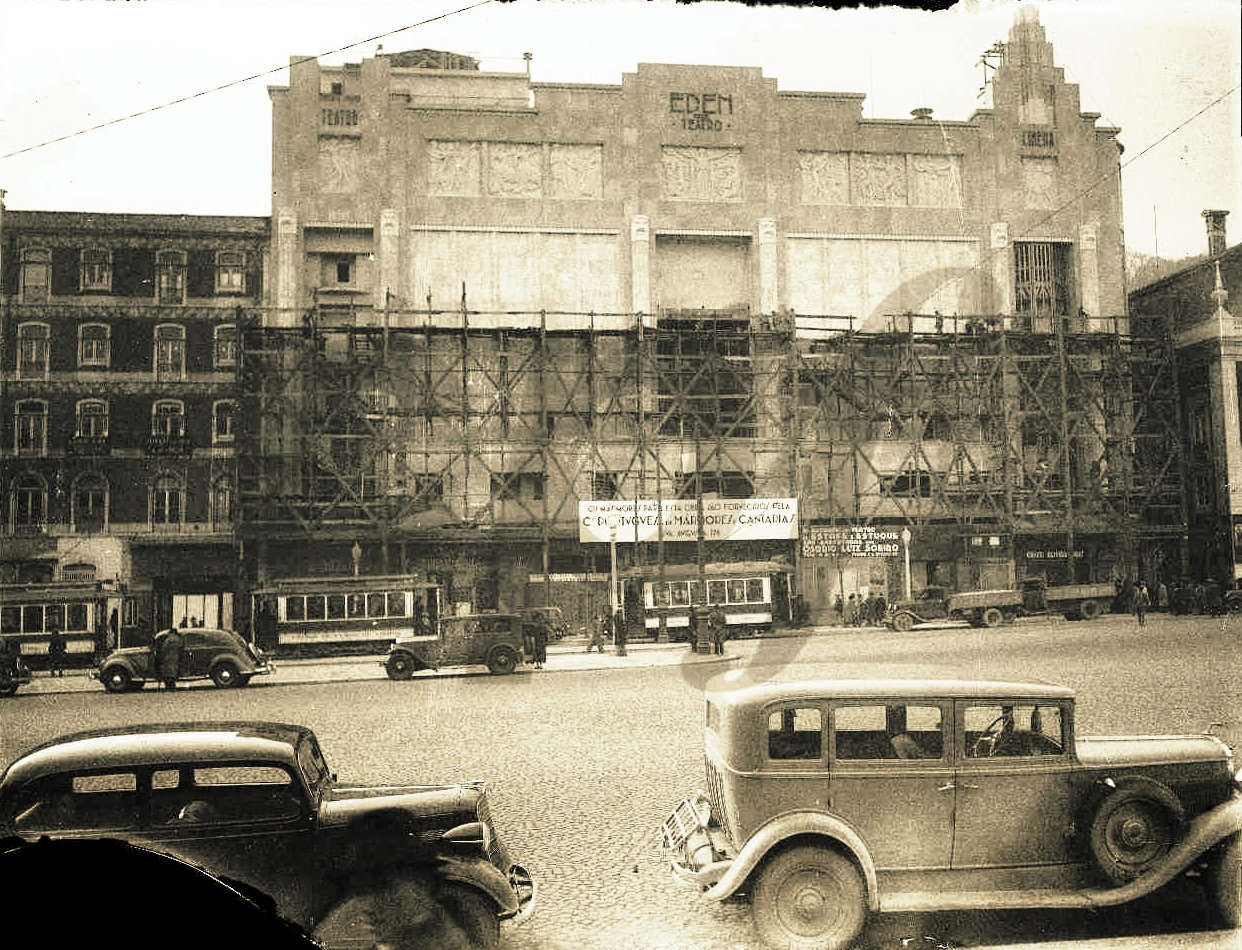
Reconstruction in 1935

Two revues were performed after its opening, but the theatre was then converted into a full-time cinema. At this time, the Éden began to be known as the "Éden Cinema Theatre", becoming the most popular cinema in the Portuguese capital during World War II. During the 1940s and 1950s, the Cineteatro Éden once again hosted plays, especially for children. Following some interior reconstruction, it also produced new works, and offered its audiences three venues instead of just one, including the Cinema Restauradores, which, with an entrance to the right of the building, offered cheap tickets and continuous sessions.

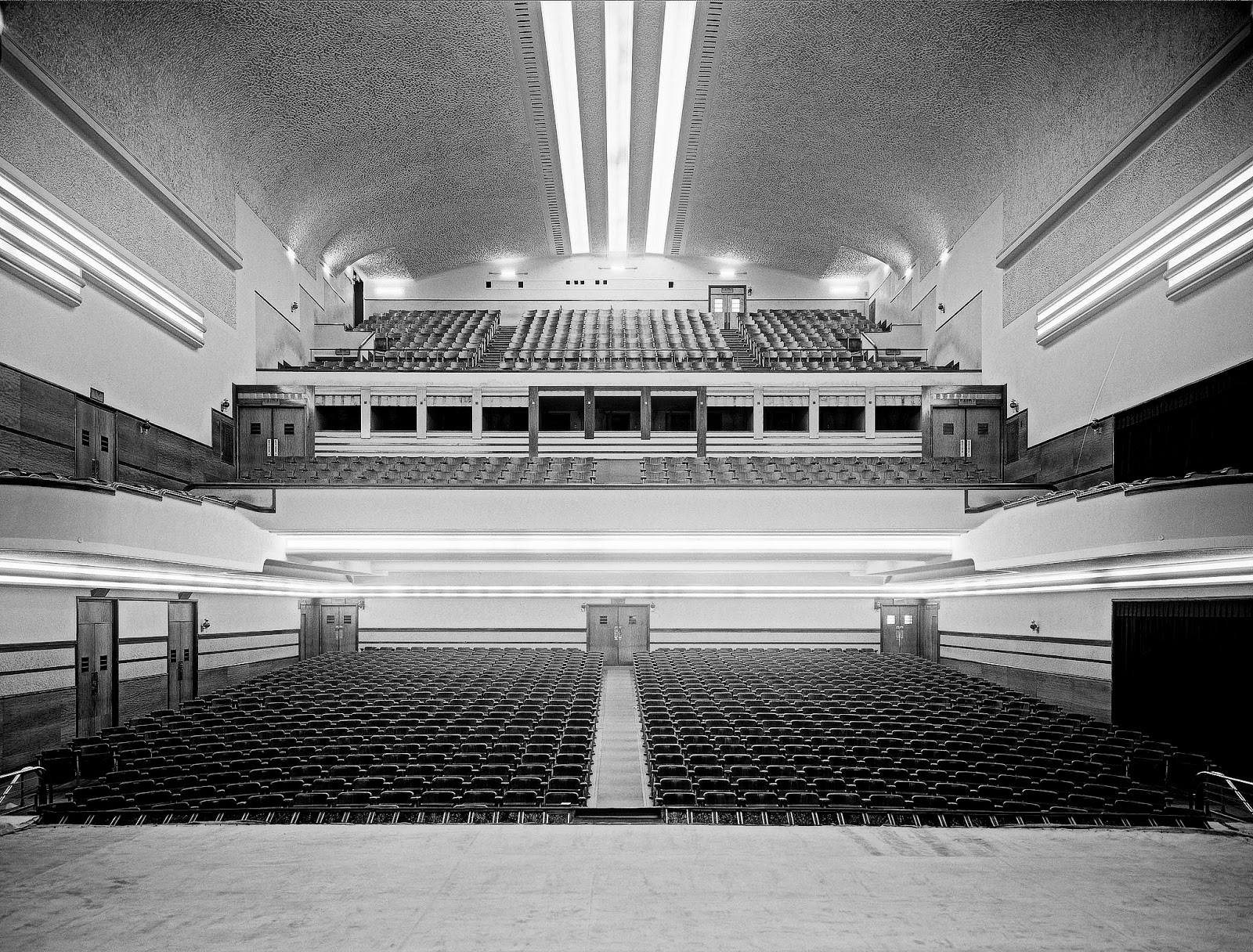
Auditorium in 1937

== Closure ==
During the 1980s, the cinema began to decline, reflecting the decline during that period in downtown Lisbon, which became more violent, with the presence of drug users, criminals, and prostitutes. It initially tried to address the problem of poor audiences by moving from classic films to Westerns and martial arts films but this was not successful and the venue closed on 31 January 1989.

== Modern day ==
The building was sold in 1989 but remained closed for years. It reopened for a few weeks in 1991, when an exhibition honouring Branco was held. In 1995 work on converting the cinema to a hotel began. It is now an apartment hotel. While the façade was left unchanged, the interior was largely gutted, although the first-floor vestibule area that marked the entrance to the auditorium was retained as a tree-lined courtyard. The ground floor was leased as commercial space for a Virgin Megastores' music store, which remained in operation until 2001. Later, part of the ground floor was occupied by a Loja do Cidadão (Citizen's Shop), which provided bureaucratic services to local residents. After this the ground floor stores were left vacant for some time, being repeatedly vandalised. The building has been classified as a Building of Public Interest since 1983.

== See also ==
- List of theatres and auditoriums in Lisbon
