= Teatro Aberto =

Coordinates: 38°44′10″N 9°09′31″W

Teatro Aberto is a theatre located in Lisbon, Portugal next to the Praça Espanha.

Together with the Portuguese Society of Authors (Sociedade Portuguesa de Autores), it organizes the annual Grande Prémio de Teatro Português.

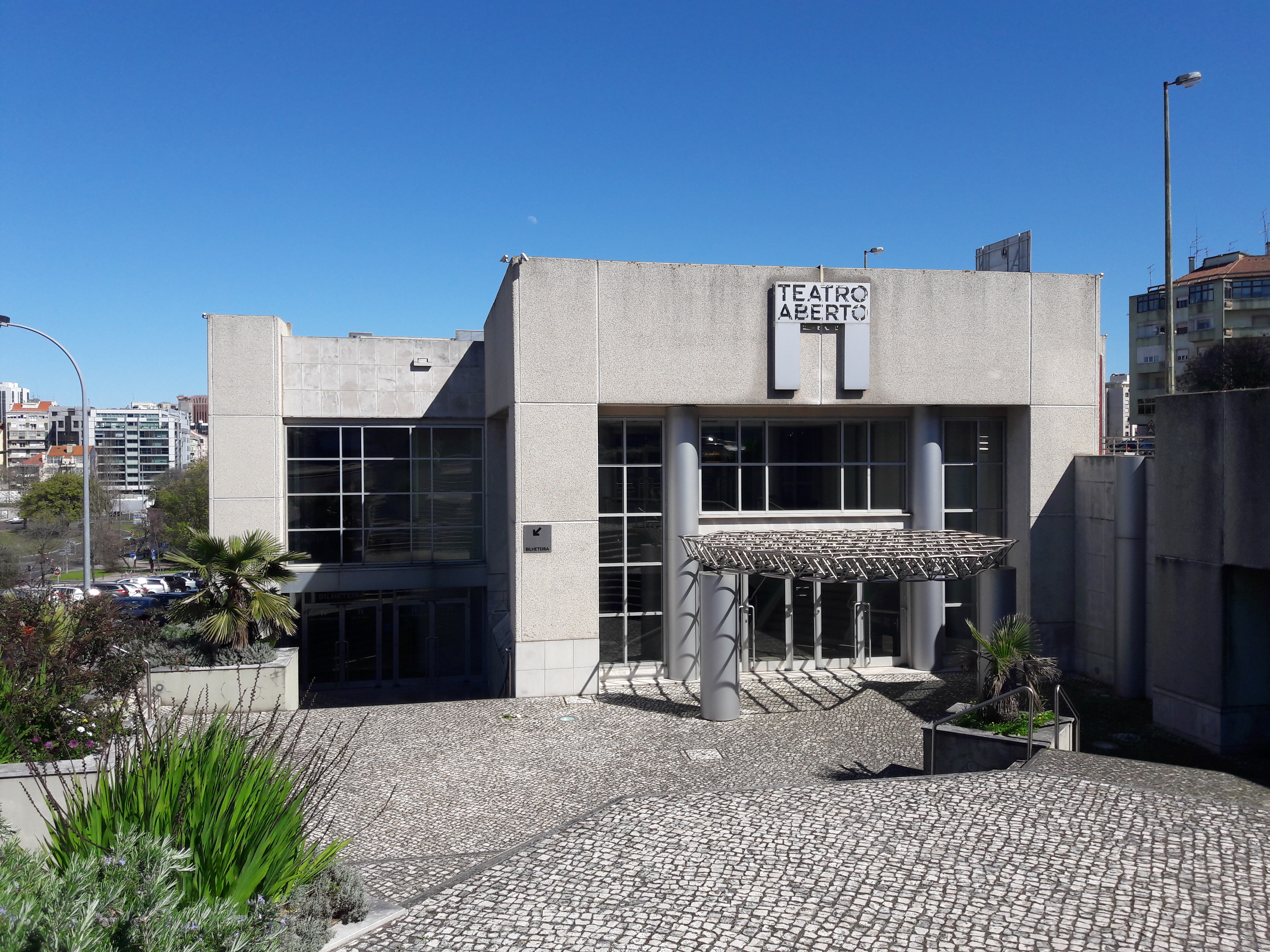
Teatro Aberto

== History ==
Teatro Aberto was founded by the Group 4 (João Lourenço, Irene Cruz, Francisco Pestana and Melim Teixeira) in 1976 at the Praça de Espanha.

== Directorate ==
The current management of this theater is composed of:

- João Lourenço (director)
- Irene Cruz (actress)
- Francisco Pestana (actor)
- Melim Teixeira (actor)

The artistic direction of the area of theater is the responsibility of João Lourenço and the musical direction belongs to João Paulo Santos. His repertoire included classics of the universal theatre as well as pieces of contemporary theatre.

As of 2009, the Teatro Aberto has produced 76 plays, 5 operas and 22 concerts in 103 performances presented in about 4,700 sessions.

Among the authors and composers featured are: Dario Fo, Nikolai Erdman, Alexei Arbuzov, Bertolt Brecht, Kurt Weill, Anton Chekhov, Luigi Pirandello, Samuel Beckett, José Saramago, Georges Feydeau, Jim Cartwright, Paul Hindemith, William Shakespeare, Shelagh Delaney, Bernard-Marie Koltès, Benjamin Britten, Bruce Graham, Botho Strauss, David Mamet, Edvard Grieg, Eurico Carrapatoso, Eugene O'Neill, Jean Anouilh, Fernando DaCosta, Frank Martin, Sam Shepard, Tankred Dorst, Werner Egk, Howard Korder, Henrik Ibsen, Pedro Osório, Nick Grosso, Kevin Elyot, Michael Frayn, Alfred Schnittke, Carole Fréchette, Neil LaBute, Michael Healey, Tom Stoppard.

These shows were played by 322 actors, 84 singers and 142 musicians. The actors were, among others: Mário Viegas, Irene Cruz, Francisco Pestana, Carmen Santos, Anna Paula, Jorge Gonçalves, Manuela Cassola, António Feio, Miguel Guilherme, João Perry, Alexandre de Sousa, Vítor Norte, Orlando Costa, Eunice Muñoz, Rogério Paulo, São José Lapa, Natália Luísa, Canto e Castro, Cristina Carvalhal, Virgílio Castelo, Sandra Faleiro, Nuno Melo, Diogo Infante, Maria Henrique, Alexandra Lencastre, Teresa Roby, Teresa Madruga, Ana Zanatti, Maria João Abreu, Rogério Samora, Ivo Canelas, Joana Seixas, Pedro Penim, Philipe Leroux, Raquel Dias, Sylvie Rocha, Victor d’Andrade, Joana Fartaria, Paulo Oom, Paulo Pires, Joaquim Monchique, João Lagarto, Sofia Aparício, Catarina Furtado, Sofia de Portugal, Patrícia Bull, Sílvia Balancho, Maria Emília Correia, João Pedro Vaz, Margarida Marinho, Ana Nave, António Cordeiro, Luís Alberto, Rui Mendes, Sara Belo, Leonor Seixas, São José Correia, Marco Delgado, Jorge Corrula, Pedro Granger, Afonso Pimentel.

Among the singers are: Ana Ester Neves, Helena Afonso, Helena Vieira, Jorge Vaz de Carvalho, Carlos Guilherme, Mário Redondo, Ana Paula Russo, Mário João Alves, Luís Rodrigues, Marco Alves dos Santos, Carla Simões, José Corvelo, Marina Ferreira, Dora Rodrigues, Ana Serôdio, João Miguel Queiroz.

== See also ==
- List of theatres and auditoriums in Lisbon
