= Teatro Capitólio =

Cinema-Theatre in Lisbon, Portugal

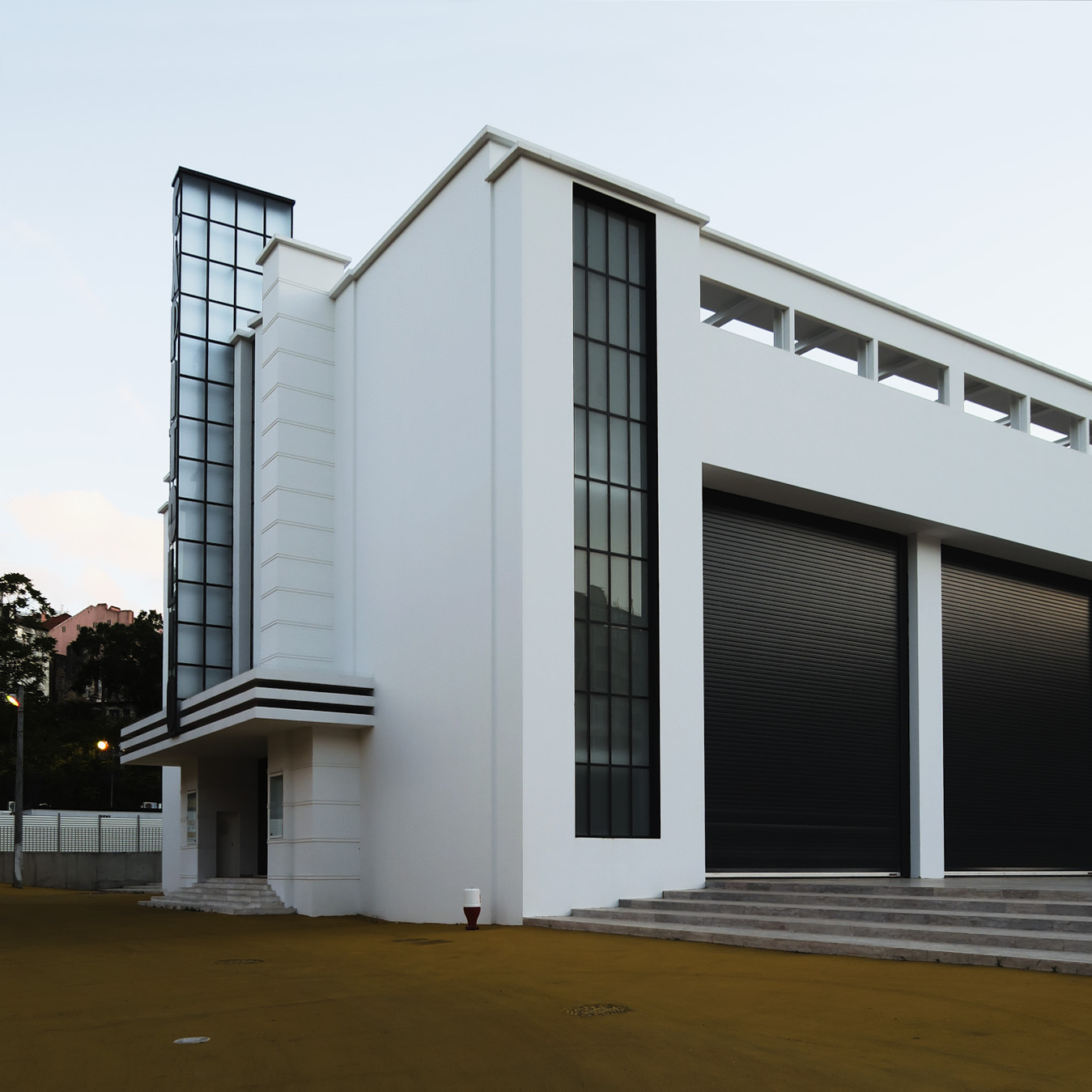
- Teatro Capitólio after restoration, 2017
- Interactive map of Teatro Capitólio
- Address: Parque Mayer, 1250-096; Lisbon; Portugal
- Coordinates: 38°43′08″N 09°08′48″W
- Owner: Lisbon City Council
- Capacity: 400 seats; 1000 standing

Construction
- Opened: 10 July 1931; reopened November 2016
- Architect: Luís Cristino da Silva

The Teatro Capitólio, officially called Cineteatro Capitólio - Teatro Raul Solnado, is located in Parque Mayer, in Lisbon, Portugal. It was opened in 1931. Because of its early modernist design it has been recognized as the first building of the Modern movement in Portugal and was declared a "Building of Public Interest" in 1983. Suffering from water damage, the theatre was closed in the 1980s and only finally reopened in November 2016 after extensive restoration.

== History ==
Built by Sociedade Avenida Parque, Ltda and designed by the architect Luís Cristino da Silva, the cinema-theatre, constructed with reinforced concrete, was officially opened on 10 July 1931. Building it in the Lisbon "theatre district" of Parque Mayer, the architect's aim was to break with the prevailing architectural traditions in Portugal and produce something that distinguished itself from other new buildings of the time. It was designed to be multifunctional, serving as a theatre, music-hall and cinema, and featured numerous innovations, including a naturally lit auditorium and a roof terrace for outdoor film screenings, which was accessed by moving ramps. The same architect was responsible for some changes to the design, carried out in 1933 and 1935.

The Portuguese film A Severa (1931), directed by José Leitão de Barros and notable as the first all-talking sound film was presented at the Capitólio in 1934, as well as many other film classics. Carnival balls were another attraction. In 1960 the Brazilian company Teatro Popular de Arte, led by Maria Della Costa, introduced the Portuguese public to Bertolt Brecht's The Good Person of Szechwan. This was the only Brecht play allowed to be presented in Portugal during the years of the Estado Novo dictatorship, not because it was less-offensive to the regime than other works by Brecht but because the Government wanted to maintain good diplomatic relations with Brazil. The play's presentation at the Capitólio caused numerous complaints, with some in the audience sympathetic to the Estado Novo objecting to the play and throwing things onto the stage. The performance of the play was cancelled a few days later.

After a fire broke out at the D. Maria II National Theatre in 1964, the theatre company of the leading Portuguese actress Amélia Rey Colaço moved to Teatro Avenida. However, that theatre was also badly damaged by a fire in 1967, and in the following year the company moved to the Capitólio, remaining until 1970. In 1973, the actress Laura Alves took over the direction of the Capitólio theatre company. Following the abolition of censorship in 1974 after the Carnation Revolution that saw the overthrow of the Estado Novo, the cinema started to innovate and presented, for the first time in Portugal, the pornographic film, Deep Throat, which was screened five or six times a day and was almost completely sold out. It continued to specialize in this type of movie. In the early 1980s, a skating rink was added on the top floor, doubling up as a discothèque where people could skate to the sound of music.

== Restoration ==
Due to lack of maintenance the Capitólio became visibly degraded in the 1980s. Several attempts were made to rescue it but in the early 2000s it was proposed to demolish the theatre and replace it with a new performing arts centre, to be designed by the Canadian-American architect Frank Gehry. This idea provoked controversy and was eventually dropped, mainly as a result of the efforts of "Citizens for Capitólio", which argued that the existing building should be restored. The building was included on the 2006 World Monuments Watch list of the 100 most endangered sites in 2006, drawing international attention to the condition of the structure.

In December 2007, the Lisbon City Council approved the restoration of the Parque Mayer district and of the theatre. Work on the Capitólio would address the structural water damage and return the building to its original design. The work, which began in the first quarter of 2010, cost around 10 million Euros, part of which was funded by the Casino Lisboa. Prior to the work beginning, it was agreed to give the theatre the name of the actor Raul Solnado, who had died in August 2009. The rehabilitated theatre was opened in November 2016, equipped with up-to-date stage, sound, and screen technologies and addressing modern safety standards. The main hall has 400 movable seats and can accommodate up to 1000 people standing. The architect for the renovation, Alberto de Souza Oliveira, received the 2016 Valmor and Municipal Architecture Prize for his work.

== See also ==
- List of theatres and auditoriums in Lisbon
