= Teatro ABC =

Theatre in Lisbon, Portugal

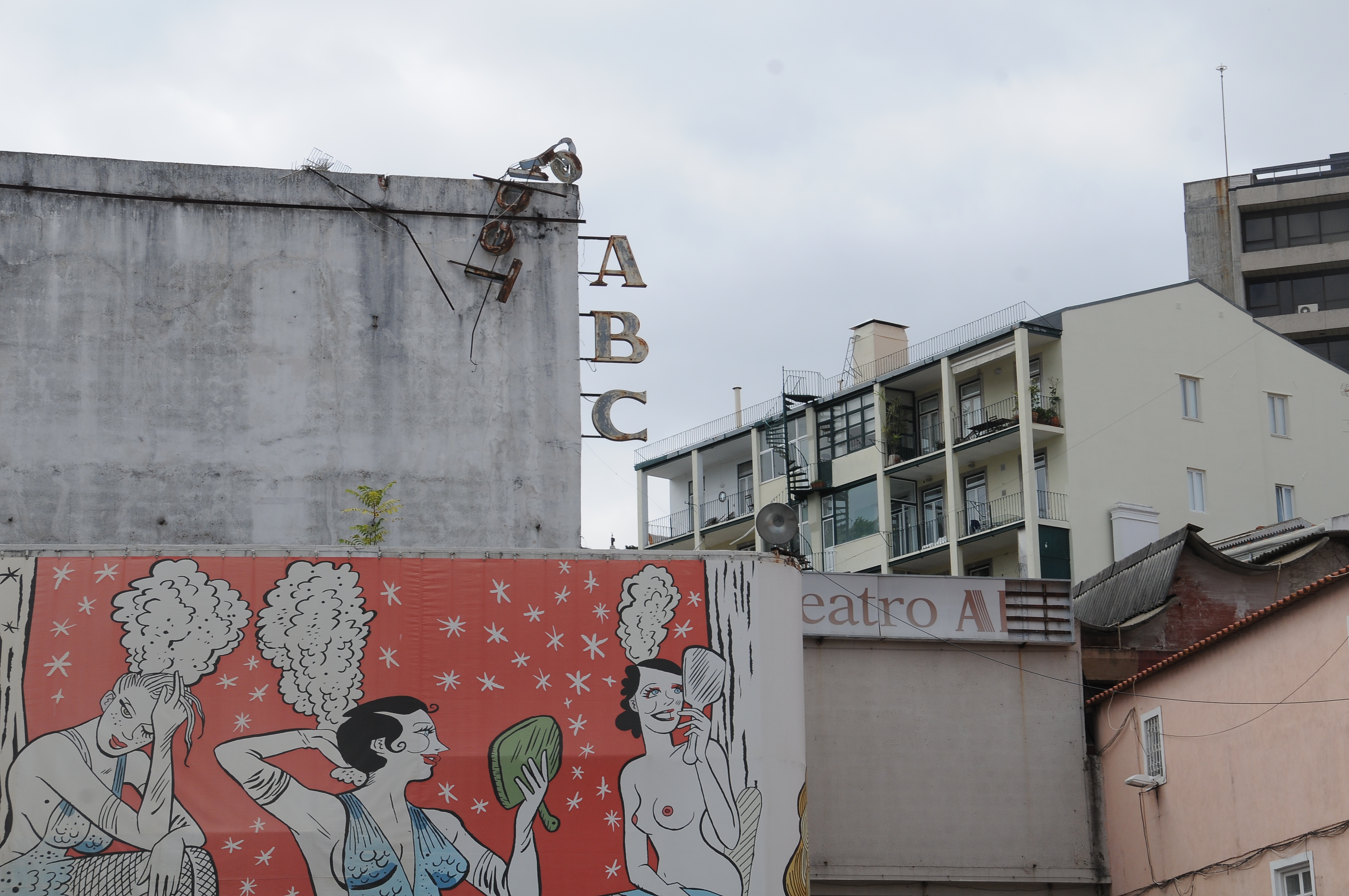
- Interactive map of Teatro ABC
- Address: Lisbon; Portugal

Construction
- Opened: 1 July 1922; reopened after a fire, 1993
- Closed: 1997

The Teatro ABC was the last of four theatres built in the Parque Mayer theatre district of the Portuguese capital of Lisbon. It opened in January 1956 and closed in 1995.

Located on land adjacent to the Teatro Maria Vitória that had previously been used for restaurants, a skating rink, and an open-air cinema, the Teatro ABC was built by the businessman José Miguel, who directed it from its opening in 1956 until 1971, the year of his death. It was the only heated theatre in the Parque Mayer area, which was considered to be the Broadway of Lisbon. Teatro ABC suffered a fire on 13 August 1990, with the show being presented at the time being transferred to the nearby Teatro Capitólio. It was rebuilt and re-opened in 1993 but proved unviable and was closed definitively in 1997, being finally demolished in 2015.

The theatre mainly offered what is known in Portugal as Teatro de Revista (revues), but also put on shows for children. In its lifetime it presented 47 different revues, with some lasting for several months. Performers to appear at the theatre included António Silva, Hermínia Silva, Nicolau Breyner, José Raposo, and Simone de Oliveira. From 1972, beginning with the revue, O Fim da Macacada (The end of stupidity), it was able to make significant changes to the contents of the revues presented, firstly as a result of a more liberal approach to censorship under the new president, Marcelo Caetano, and, more importantly, after the Estado Novo dictatorship was overthrown in April 1974. For the first time, excerpts from a show were broadcast on the radio. However, some of the uncensored performances brought the performers into conflict with the management of the theatre company and some of the actors moved to the Teatro Ádóque in Lisbon.

== See also ==
- List of theatres and auditoriums in Lisbon
