= Parque Mayer, Lisbon =

Theatre district in Lisbon, Portugal

Parque Mayer
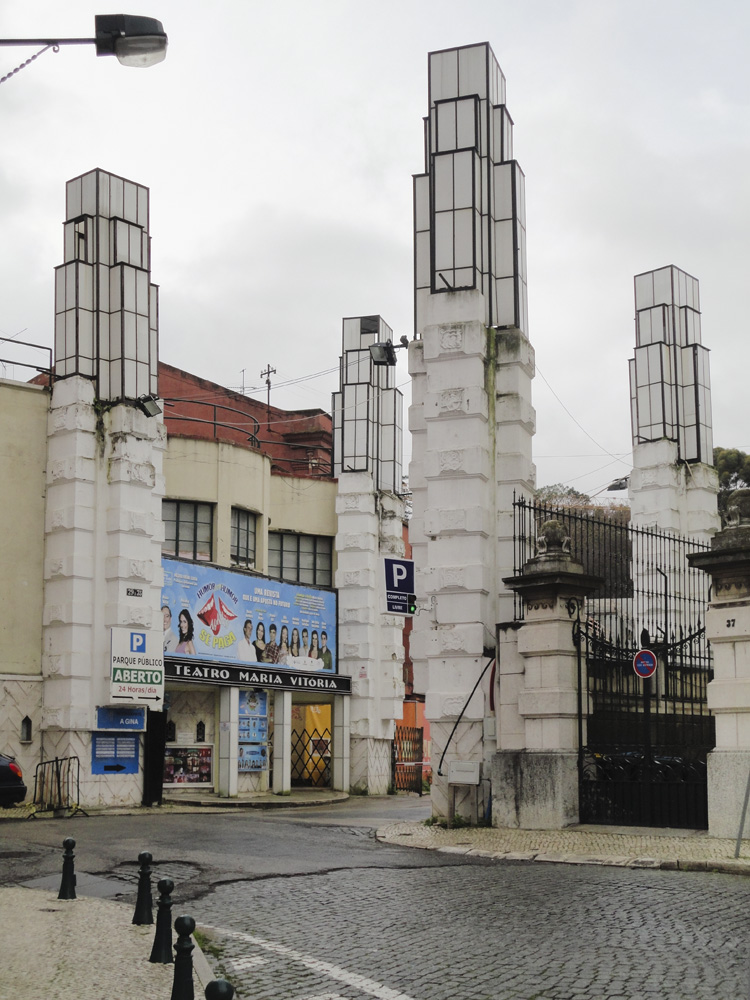
- Interactive map of Parque Mayer
- Location: Lisbon, Portugal
- Coordinates: 38°43′08″N 9°08′47″W
- Opened: July 1922
- Owner: Lisbon City Council

Parque Mayer is a theatrical and entertainment district in the Portuguese capital of Lisbon. Originally created as a summer amusement park, it at one time had four theatres, although one was demolished in 2015 and another has not been used since 1992. Successive proposals have been made for upgrading the area, but none has yet come to fruition.

== Origins ==
Parque Mayer was developed in gardens once attached to the Palacete Mayer (now the Spanish Embassy). It is situated between Lisbon's Botanical Gardens and the west side of the Avenida da Liberdade, an important boulevard that heads out of the old centre of Lisbon in a northwesterly direction. The land and an earlier palace are likely to have belonged to a religious order that was abolished by the Marquis of Pombal who was effectively the ruler of Portugal between 1750 and 1777. He sold the property to the Marquise of Alorna and after passing through several hands it was purchased by Adolfo Lima Mayer (1838 - 1918) who demolished the former palace of the Marquise and constructed the Palacete Mayer and its gardens. The palace was designed by Nicola Bigaglia (1841–1908). In 1902 it became the first winner of the Valmor prize, awarded to the best new building in Lisbon of the year.

== An amusement park ==
With the death of Lima Mayer in 1918, the building was sold by his heirs, being purchased by Artur Brandão. The palace was initially used as recreational and gambling nightclub but in 1930 was sold to the Spanish Government. In 1921, the gardens were sold to Luís Galhardo, a journalist and theatrical impresario who dreamed of creating an entertainment area similar to the Tivoli Gardens in Copenhagen or Coney Island in New York City. As a first step he formed the Avenida Parque Company (Sociedade Avenida Parque), which initially offered activities of the type found in village fairs in Portugal, including wrestling and boxing matches, merry-go-rounds, and shooting galleries. Later, restaurants, a skating rink, a circus, dodgem cars and an open-air cinema were added.

== Theatres ==
In July 1922, Teatro Maria Vitória, the first theatre in Parque Mayer, was opened. This theatre continues to function, despite having been almost destroyed by a fire in 1986. This was followed in 1926 by the Teatro Variedades, which still exists but has not been used since 1992. Restoration work was due to begin in late 2020. In 1966, this theatre also suffered a fire. Both of these theatres offered what is known in Portugal as Teatro de Revista (Magazine shows, or revues).

Two other theatres were subsequently added. The Teatro Capitólio, which had a modernist design was opened in 1931. It was designed to be multifunctional, serving as a theatre, music-hall and cinema, and featured numerous innovations. It was reopened in 2016 after a long closure caused by water damage to the building. The Capitólio offered serious theatre as well as films. In time, it became known for showing pornographic films, including the first Portuguese screening of Deep Throat. The last theatre to be built, Teatro ABC, which was opened in 1956, was also the first to be definitively closed, being demolished in 2015. This was also used primarily for Teatro de Revista shows.

== Decline ==
At the end of the 1970s, the area began to decline in the face of television and alternative entertainment opportunities. Having always had different types of activities to offer its visitors, it lost this diversity and became known primarily for the theatres offering revue or variety shows. With the degradation of these buildings, it became a rather unattractive place to visit. Proposals for its rehabilitation had emerged long before its decline. In 1940 it was proposed to extend the Botanical Gardens to include the Parque Mayer area. In the early 1970s it was proposed to build two hotels in the zone. In the 1990s a plan proposed the demolition of the Teatro Variedades, with the construction of housing, offices, stores and cinemas.

At the end of the 1990s, the British architect, Norman Foster, was asked to create a new revitalization project for Bragaparques, a company that operates car parks, which had become the owner of the site in 1999, paying 13 million Euros. Foster presented four different ideas but no further progress was made. In 2005, Bragaparques exchanged Parque Mayer for land owned by Lisbon City Council in the Entrecampos area of Lisbon. This transaction was subject to legal disputes, resulting in Bragaparques once again become the owner in 2012, following a court order. Further court cases resulted in Lisbon having to pay sizeable compensation to the company. In 2005, the City Council asked the Canadian-American architect Frank Gehry for a proposal. Gehry suggested the incorporation of a casino in the area but, again, no progress was made. In 2007, a competition was announced for proposals regarding what to do with the site. Five companies competed, with the winning proposal returning to the idea of extending the Botanical Gardens, while maintaining theatres and other services. In 2010 a contract was issued for the restoration of the modernist Teatro Capitólio, with the work being completed in 2016.
