= Teatro Variedades =

Coordinates: 40.4123°N 3.6999°W

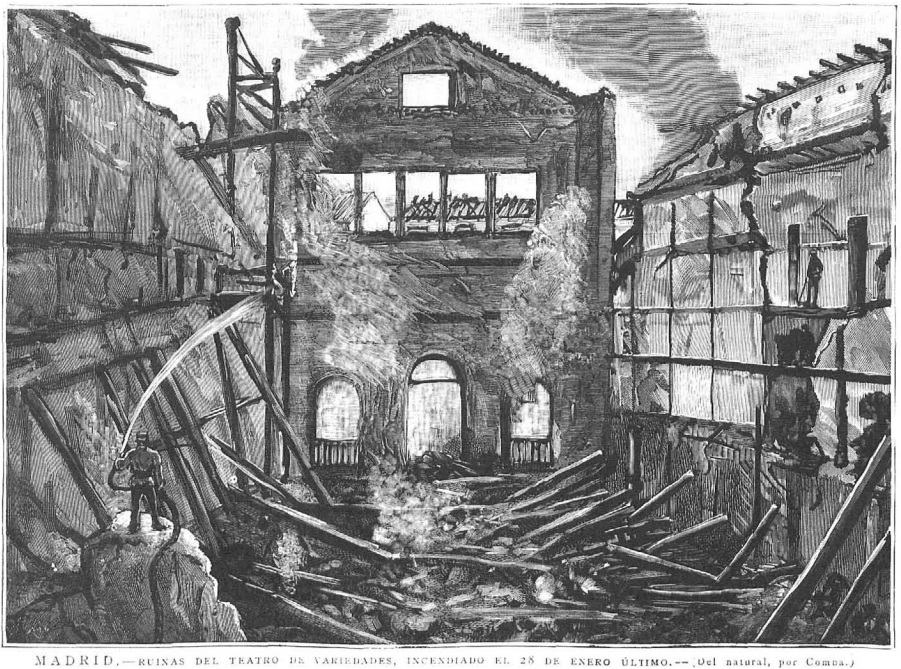

The Teatro Variedades was a famous Colosseum in the city of Madrid, Spain, in the 19th century. Erected in 1847, the theater was located at 40 Magdalena Street. It was known once as one of the most entertaining theatres for the not-so-demanding general public. There, the Boufee genre, the political revue and other minor theatrical genres were inventively exploited. The theater was consumed by flames in a fire on 29 January 1888, resulting in its demolition because of its wooden foundations.
