= Raul Solnado =

Portuguese actor and comedian

Raul Solnado GCIH OIH
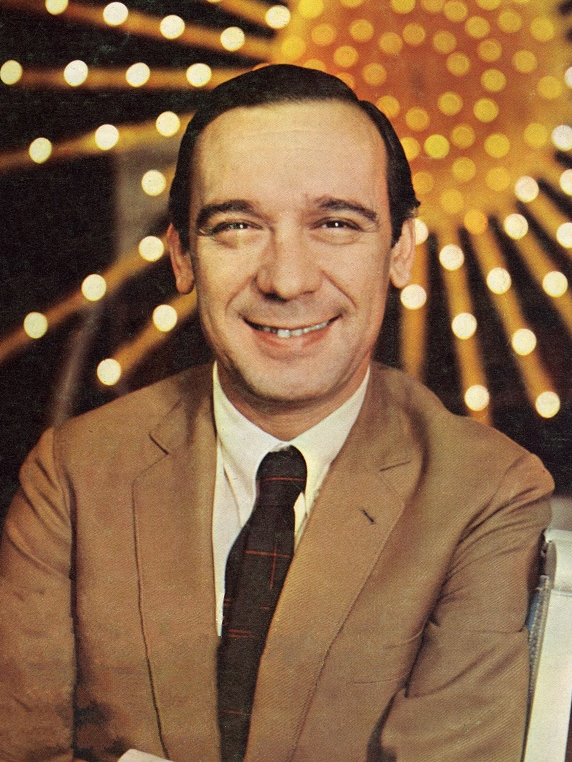
- Raul Solnado in 1968
- Born: Raul Augusto Almeida Solnado; 19 October 1929; Lisbon, Portugal
- Died: 8 August 2009 (aged 79); Lisbon, Portugal
- Occupations: Actor, Comedian
- Years active: 1960–2009

Raul Augusto Almeida Solnado GCIH OIH (19 October 1929 - 8 August 2009) was a popular Portuguese actor and comedian. He was born in Lisbon's Madragoa neighborhood, and first appeared on stage there. In his long career, he developed many comic pieces that have become classics.

His humour was, at the time (especially considering Portugal was still under the dictatorial Salazar regime), both unexpected and fresh. It included a lot of nonsense, and stories making fun of daily life.

He often played an ingenuous poor man, whose life was neither good or bad. He portrayed characters with conviction and humor. His best material included pieces written by him, such as "Ida ao médico" ("At the doctor"), and others based on Spanish comedian Miguel Gila’s material: (“A guerra de 1908” / “The war of 1908” and “História da minha vida” / “The story of my life”).

== Example ==
As a first-time patient in hospital, addressing to a nurse (from “At the doctor”):

“...all I want you to do for me is get me a nice private room.” Well, there she went on her way to speak to the owner of the hospital, and they were terribly nice. They got me a huge private room, lots of space, very nice...and just to keep me company, they put eighty-five other patients in the room!

Solnado hosted Portugal's first talk show, in 1969, alongside Carlos Cruz and Fialho Gouveia. The show, called Zip Zip is still considered a landmark in the history of Portuguese television.

He died on 8 August 2009 of heart disease.

== Distinctions ==
=== National orders ===
- Grand Cross of the Order of Prince Henry the Navigator (9 June 2004)
- Officer of the Order of Prince Henry the Navigator (9 June 1982)
