= Culture of Portugal =

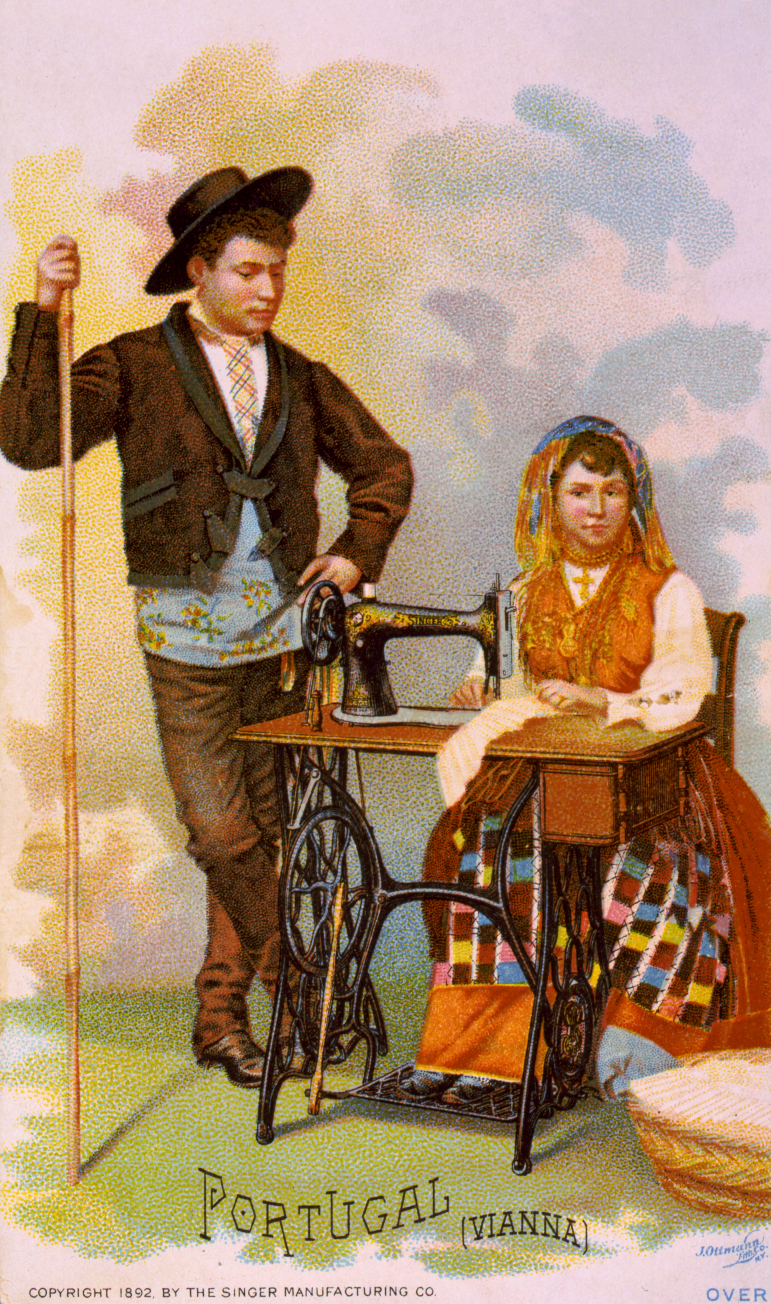
A 19th-century Portuguese couple with typical rural clothes from Minho Province, in a Singer sewing machine advertisement card, distributed at the World's Columbian Exposition, Chicago, 1893

The culture of Portugal designates the cultural practices and traditions of the Portuguese people. It is rooted on the interactions between many different civilizations that inhabited the area during the past millennia. From prehistoric cultures, to its Pre-Roman civilizations (such as the Lusitanians, the Gallaeci, the Celtici, and the Cynetes, amongst others), passing through its contacts with the Phoenician-Carthaginian world, the Roman period (see Hispania, Lusitania and Gallaecia), the Germanic invasions of the Suebi, Buri (see Kingdom of the Suebi) and Visigoths (see Visigothic Kingdom), Viking incursions, Sephardic Jewish settlement, and finally, the Moorish Umayyad invasion of Hispania and the subsequent expulsion during the Reconquista, all have influenced the country's culture and history.

The name of Portugal itself reveals much of the country's early history, stemming from the Roman name Portus Cale, a Latin name meaning "Port of Cale" (Cale likely is a word of Celtic origin - Cailleach-Bheur her other name; the Mother goddess of the Celtic people as in Calais, Caledonia, Beira. She was the one who, with a hammer created mountains and valleys; the one who hid in stones and trees - Mother nature), later transformed into Portucale, and finally into Portugal, which emerged as a county of the Kingdom of León (see County of Portugal) and became an independent kingdom in 1139. During the 15th and 16th centuries, Portugal was a major economic, political, and cultural power, its global empire stretching from the Americas, to Africa, and various regions of Asia and Oceania.

Portugal, as a country with a long history, is home to several ancient architectural structures, as well as typical art, furniture and literary collections mirroring and chronicling the events that shaped the country and its peoples. It has a large number of cultural landmarks ranging from museums to ancient church buildings to medieval castles. Portugal is home to fifteen UNESCO World Heritage Sites, ranking it 8th in Europe and 17th in the world.

== Overview ==
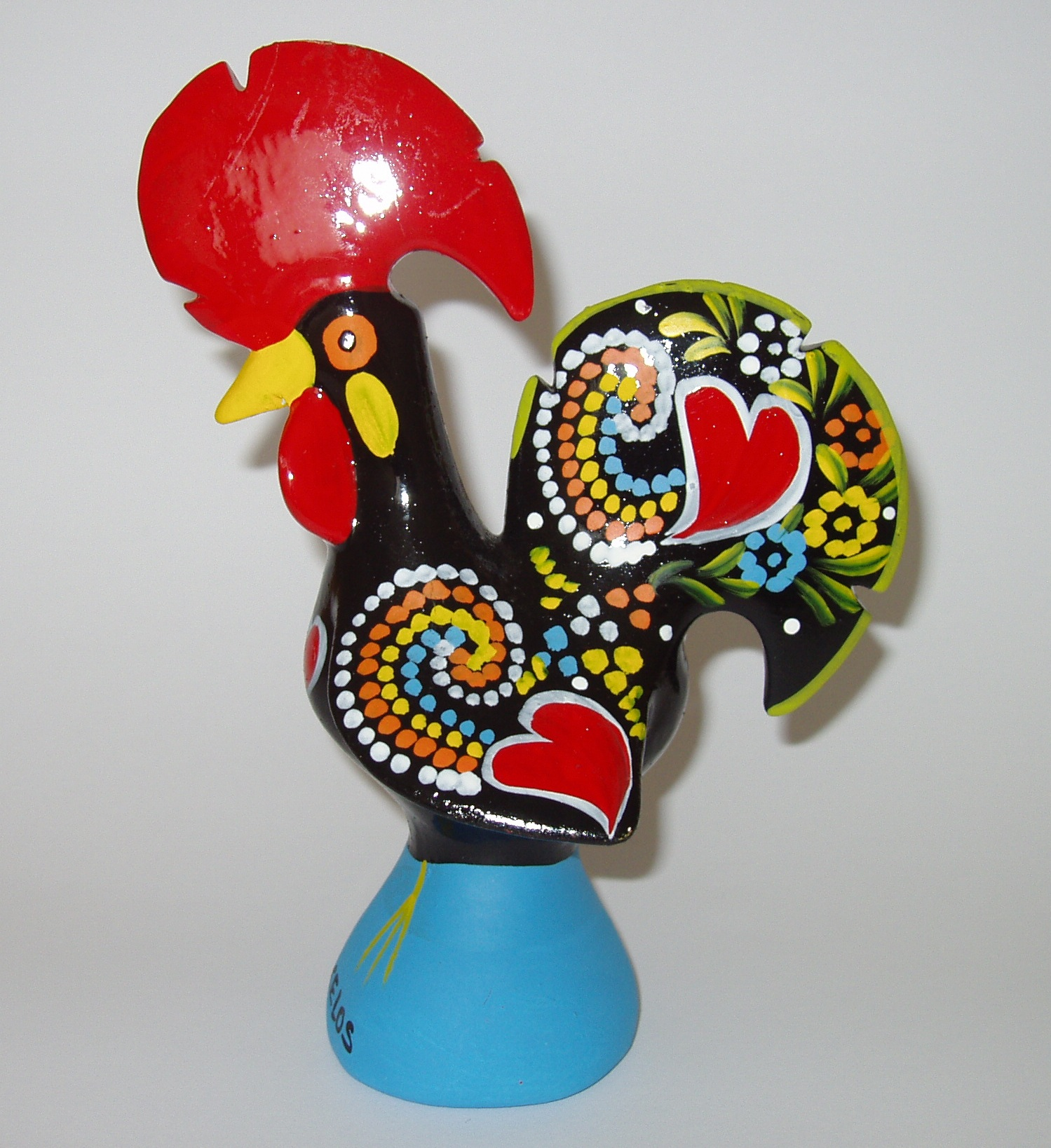
Rooster of Barcelos, the iconic Portuguese souvenir

The Portuguese participate in many cultural activities, indulging their appreciation of art, music, drama, and dance. Portugal has a rich traditional folklore (Ranchos Folclóricos), with great regional variety. Many cities and towns have a museum and a collection of ancient monuments and buildings. Many towns have at least a cinema, some venues to listen to music and locations to see arts and crafts. In the larger cities visits to the theatre, concerts or galleries of modern exhibitions are popular, and Portugal can boast not only international-scale venues in Lisbon, Porto, Braga, Guimarães and Coimbra but also many acclaimed artists from various disciplines. The importance of the arts is illustrated by the fact that on the death of Amália Rodrigues, the "Queen of Fado" (fado is Portugal's national music) in October 1999, three days of national mourning was declared. In 1998, José Saramago, one of Portugal's well-known writers, was awarded the Nobel Prize for literature. Lisbon (1994), Porto (2001) and Guimarães (2012) were all designated European Capitals of Culture, contributing to a current renaissance in artistic creation, and in 2004 Portugal hosted the European football finals in specially constructed stadiums.

In smaller towns and villages, cultural activity may revolve around local folklore, with musical groups performing traditional dance and song. Local festivities are very popular during the summer season in all kinds of localities ranging from villages to cities, as well as beach holidays from July to September. Portuguese people in almost all major towns and the cities like to know their places which are generally well equipped with modern facilities and offer a wide variety of attractions ranging from shops and stores of the most renowned brands to cinemas, restaurants and hypermarkets. Café culture is also regarded as an important cultural feature of the Portuguese. As the most popular sport, football events involving major Portuguese teams are always widely followed with great enthusiasm. There are a few bullrings in Portugal, although the passion for bullfighting was traditionally more popular in the Ribatejo and Alentejo regions.

== Architecture ==
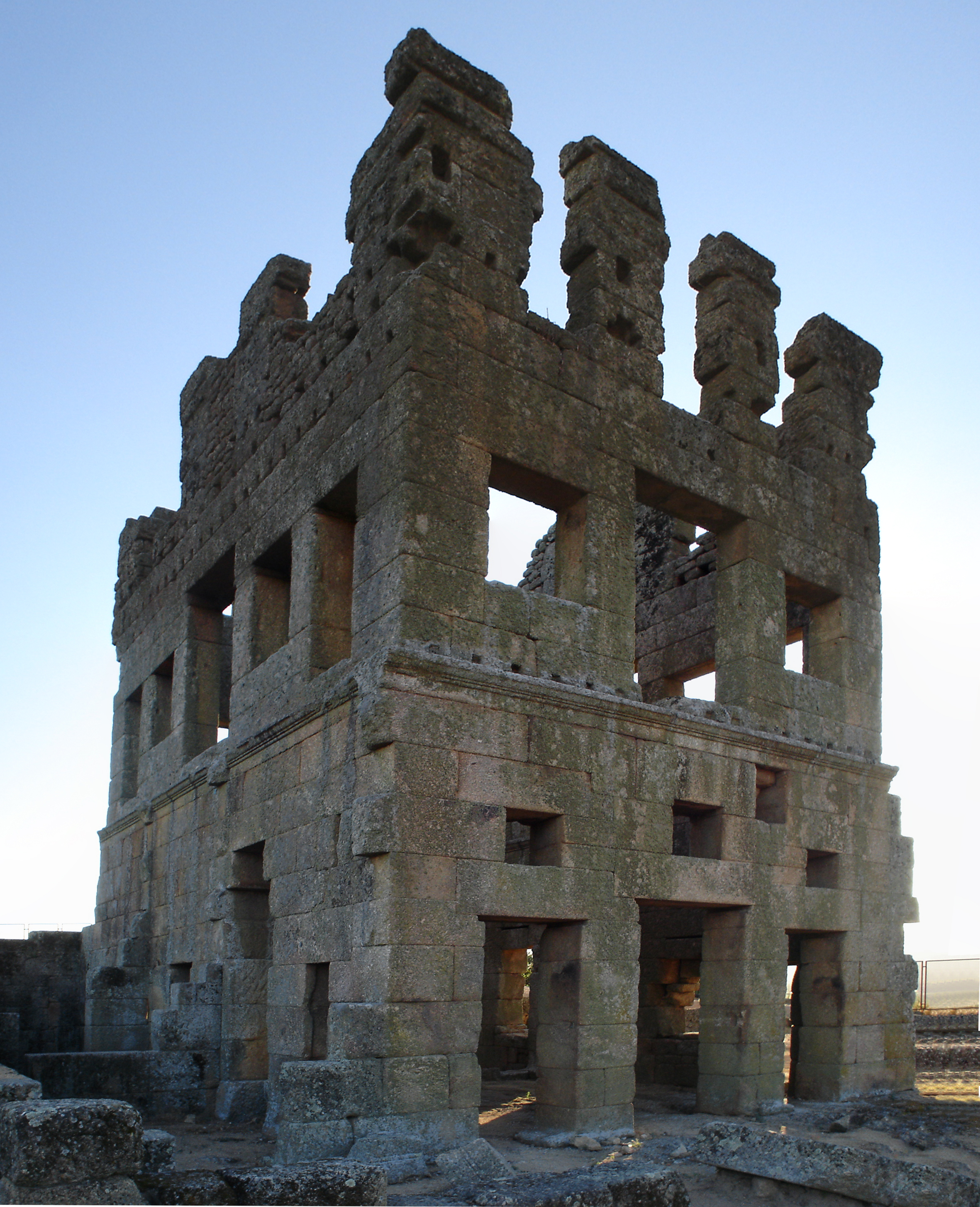
Centum Cellas Tower, c. 1st century AD (Roman period)

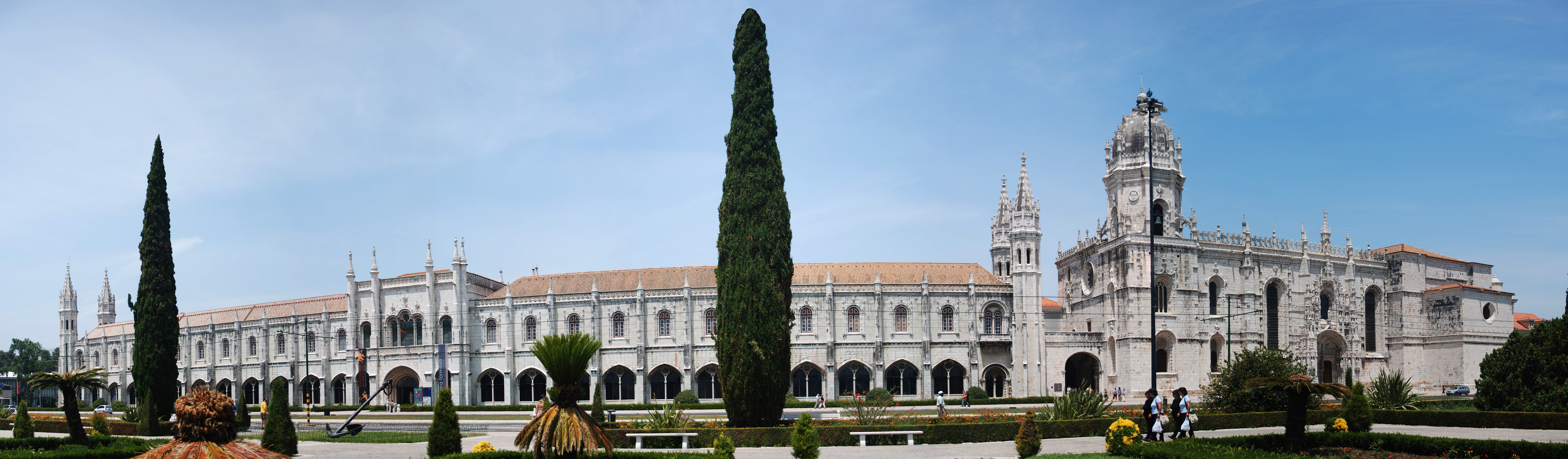
Jerónimos Monastery is Portugal's best example of its Manueline architecture

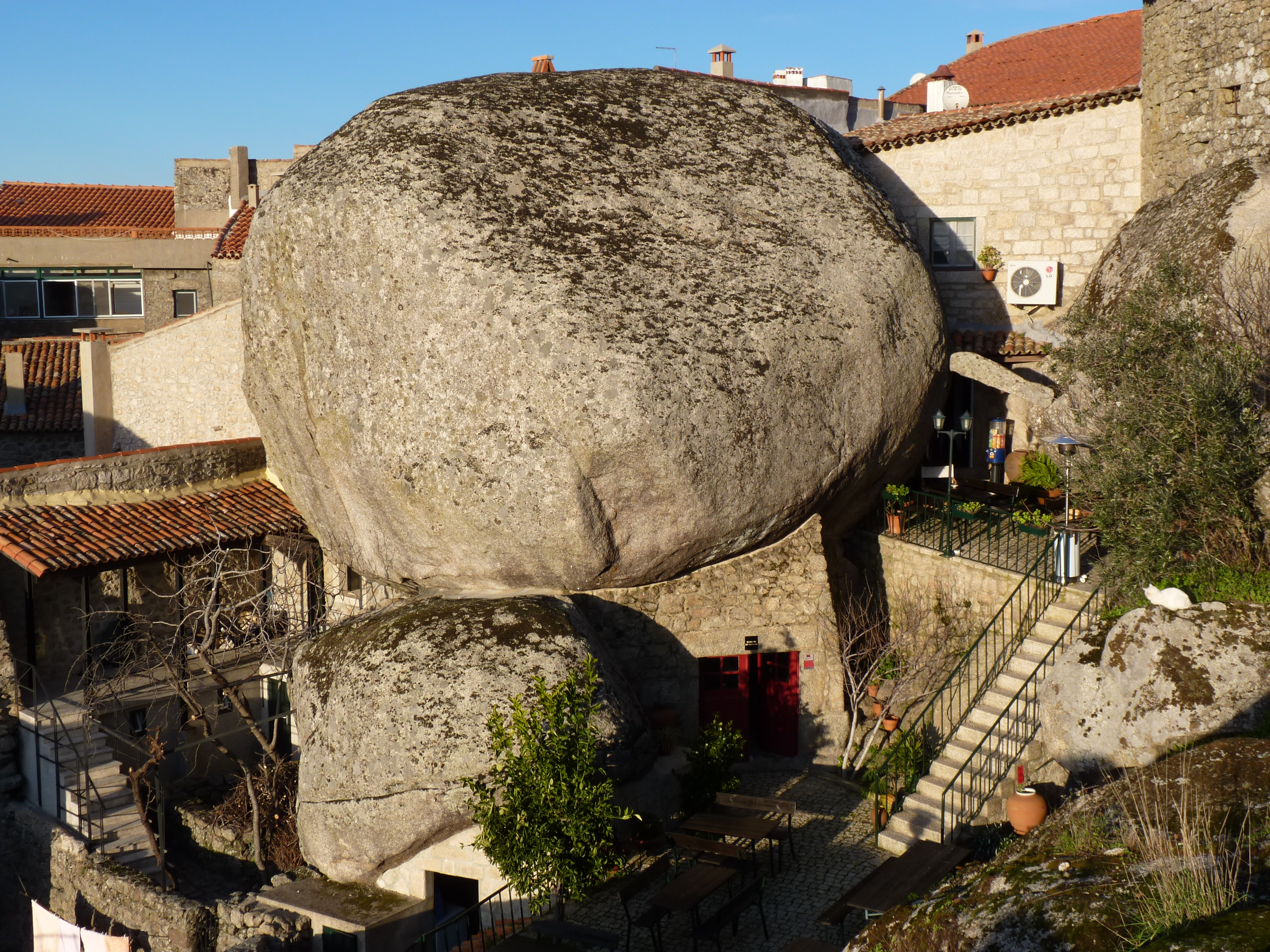
Aldeia Velha de Monsanto

Rua Augusta street and its typical Portuguese calçada in the Pombaline Lower Town, Lisbon

Since the second millennium BC, there has been important construction in the area where Portugal is situated today. Portugal boasts several scores of medieval castles, as well as the ruins of several villas and forts from the period of Celtic and Roman occupation. Modern Portuguese architecture follows the most advanced trends seen in European mainstream architecture with no constraints, though preserving some of its distinct characteristics. The azulejo and the Portuguese pavement are two typical elements of Portuguese architecture. Portugal is perhaps best known for its distinctive Late-Gothic Manueline architecture, with its intricate designs attributed to Portugal's Age of Discoveries.

Another type of architecture is Johannine baroque, owing to King John V's long reign which lasted 44 years. Thanks to the gold from Brazil, John V of Portugal could afford foreign artists such as Nicolau Nasoni, to build outstanding works of art. The creations of Portuguese artists can be identified throughout the country, in the altars of gilded panels, blue and white tiles which adorn churches, halls, staircases and gardens.

It was during this period of prosperity, that some of the greatest Portuguese artworks were completed, including: the Royal Building of Mafra, the Clérigos Church (also known as Tower of the Clerics), the Baroque Library Biblioteca Joanina, the Sanctuary of Bom Jesus do Monte in Braga, the Shrine of Our Lady of Remedies in Lamego or the Mateus Palace in Vila Real. Because of the history of the Portuguese Empire, several countries across the world are home to sizeable heritages of Portuguese colonial architecture, notably Brazil and Uruguay in the Americas, Angola, Cabo Verde, São Tomé and Príncipe, Benin, Ghana, Morocco, Guinea Bissau, Zimbabwe, and Mozambique in Africa, and China, India, Indonesia, Malaysia, and Timor Leste in Asia. Notable Portuguese architects of the past have included Diogo de Arruda (15–16th c.), João Antunes (17th c.), Eugénio dos Santos and Carlos Mardel (18th c.), José Luis Monteiro (19th c.), Raul Lino, Cassiano Branco and Fernando Távora (20th c.). Famous living architects include Gonçalo Byrne, Eduardo Souto de Moura (Pritzker winner), António Maria Braga, João Carrilho da Graça and Álvaro Siza Vieira (Priktzer winner).

== Dance ==
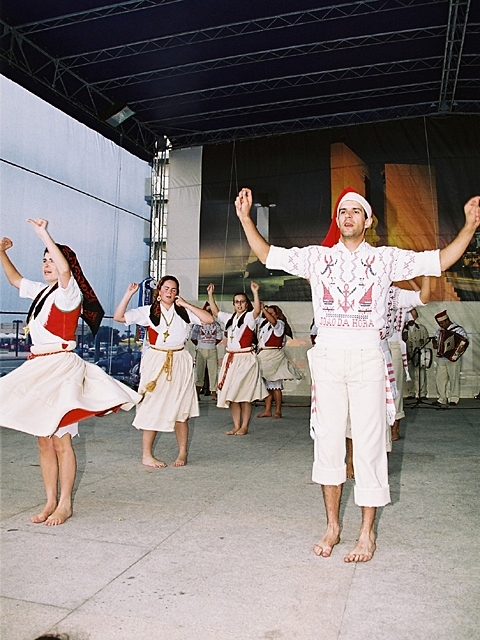
A traditional dance of Póvoa de Varzim

Folk dances include: Circle dance, Vira (of the Minho region), Two-Steps Waltz, Fandango (of the Ribatejo region), Schottische (Chotiça), Corridinho (of the Algarve and Estremadura regions), Bailarico, Vareirinha, Malhão, Vareira, Maneio, Vira de Cruz, Vira Solto, Vira de Macieira, Sapatinho, Tau-Tau, Ciranda, Zé que Fumas, Regadinho, O Pedreiro and Ó Ti Taritatu. There are also variations of these dances called the Chamarita in the Azores. Dance apparel is highly varied, ranging from work clothes to Sunday's best, with rich distinguished from the poor.

== Cinema ==
In the 1990s around 10 full-length fictional works were produced per annum, Portugal's filmmakers tending to be artisans. Financing of Portuguese cinema is by state grants and from television stations. The internal market is very small and Portuguese penetration of international markets is fairly precarious. A film is considered a success when it draws an audience of more than which few Portuguese films manage to achieve.

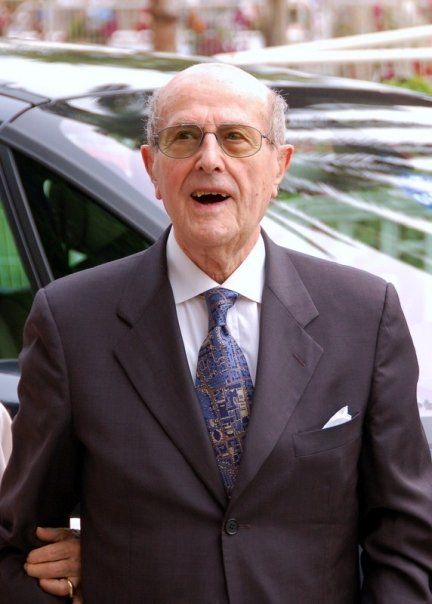
Filmmaker Manoel de Oliveira

Director Manoel de Oliveira was the oldest director in the world, and continued to make films until his death on 2 April 2015, at the age of 106. Since 1990 he made an average of one film per annum. He has received international recognition awards and won the respect of the cinematography community all over the world. Retrospectives of his works have been shown at the Los Angeles Film Festival (1992), the National Gallery of Art in Washington, D.C. (1993), the San Francisco Film Festival, and the Cleveland Museum of Art (1994). Despite his international recognition, the films of Oliveira (and that of other Portuguese directors) are neglected locally.

João César Monteiro, a member of the generation that founded the "New Portuguese Cinema" in the 1960s which was influenced by the Nouvelle Vague, a provocative film maker in the 1990s made "O Último Mergulho" (1992), "A Comédia de Deus" (1995), "Le Bassin de John Wayne" (1997) and "As Bodas de Deus" (1998). "A Comédia de Deus" won the Jury's Special Prize at the Venice Film Festival in 1995.

Teresa Villaverde is a younger filmmaker and in the 1990s she surfaced as a director, her film (Três Irma's, 1994) won the best actress award at the Venice Film Festival.

Significant comedy films of the 1930s and 1940s include: A Canção de Lisboa (1933) directed by José Cottinelli Telmo, starring Vasco Santana and Beatriz Costa, the second Portuguese sound feature film (the first was A Severa, a 1931 documentary by Manoel de Oliveira, was originally filmed without soundtrack, which was added afterwards), and still one of the best-loved films in Portugal, with several of its lines and songs still being quoted today; O Pai Tirano (lit. The Tyrant Father) (1941), directed by António Lopes Ribeiro, starring Vasco Santana, Francisco Ribeiro and Leonor Maia and one of the best-known comedies of the Golden Age of Portuguese Cinema; O Pátio das Cantigas (lit. The Courtyard of Songs), a comedy/ musical from 1942 directed by Francisco Ribeiro, with Vasco Santana (as Narciso), António Silva (as Evaristo), Francisco Ribeiro (as Rufino) and others. It's a portrait of the relations between neighbours in a Lisbon courtyard. A story made of small episodes of humor, friendship, rivalry, and love.

=== Recent films ===
O Crime do Padre Amaro: (lit. The Crime of Father Amaro) is a Portuguese film (2005) adapted from a book of Eça de Queiroz, directed by Carlos Coelho da Silva. This was a low quality production sponsored by Sociedade Independente de Comunicação (television channel). Even so, this film beat all the records of box- office of all the Portuguese film in Portugal. The main characters are Jorge Corrula as Padre Amaro and Soraia Chaves as Amélia, and the main ingredients of this film are the sex and the nudity.

Zona J: is a Portuguese drama/romance film directed by Leonel Vieira in 1998, starring Sílvia Alberto, Ana Bustorff, Núria Madruga, Milton Spencer and Félix Fontoura.

Sorte Nula: (lit. The Trunk) directed by Fernando Fragata, starring Hélder Mendes, António Feio, Adelaide de Sousa, Rui Unas, Isabel Figueira, Bruno Nogueira, Carla Matadinho, Tânia Miller and Zé Pedro.

Alice directed by Marco Martins and starring Beatriz Batarda, Nuno Lopes, Miguel Guilherme, Ana Bustorff, Laura Soveral, Ivo Canelas, Carla Maciel, José Wallenstein and Clara Andermatt is a multi-prize film from 2005. It has won prizes in Cannes Film Festival; Las Palmas Festival in Spain; Golden Globes in Portugal; Mar del Plata International Film Festival in Argentina, Raindance film Festival in United Kingdom and other prizes.

Filme do Desassossego or Film of Disquiet directed by João Botelho, starring Cláudio da Silva, Alexandra Lencastre, Rita Blanco, Catarina Wallenstein, Margarida Vila-Nova, Mónica Calle, Marcello Urgeghe and Ricardo Aibéo in 2010. Inspired by a book of Fernando Pessoa.

Meu Querido Mês de Agosto directed by Miguel Gomes is a hybrid fiction/documentary film from 2009 that achieved some visibility at the Cannes Film Festival.

Tabu directed by Miguel Gomes starring Ana Moreira, Carloto Cotta, Ivo Mueller, Laura Soveral, Manuel Mesquita, Isabel Muñoz Cardoso, Henrique Espírito Santo and Teresa Madruga. The film won two prizes in the 2012 Berlin International Film Festival and another two in the Las Palmas Festival in Spain.

Rafa, a short-film directed by João Salaviza, starring Rodrigo Perdigão and Joana de Verona.This film have win the best short film is Berlin International Film Festival in 2012.

Arena, directed by João Salaviza starring Carloto Cotta, won the 2009 Cannes Film Festival Golden Palm for best short film.

Sangue do meu Sangue directed by João Canijo, starring Rita Blanco, Nuno Lopes, Cleia Almeida, Anabela Moreira, Rafael Morais and Fernando Luís. Is a multi-prized film from 2012 that won prizes in: International auteur cinema festival of Barcelona; Miami Festival, Pau Festival in France; New Vision Award in Crossing Europe Festival in Austria; San Sebastin Festival; Otra Mirada Prize by TVE channel in Spain; Faial Film Festival in Portugal; Golden Globes in Portugal; Auteur Portuguese Society in Portugal and Ways of Portuguese cinema in Coimbra, Portugal.

O Barão directed by Edgar Pêra, starring Nuno Melo, Luísa Costa Gomes, Leonor Keil, Edgar Pêra, Marina Albuquerque, Miguel Sermão and Marcos Barbosa in 2010.

Alma Portuguesa (en: Portuguese Soul), a 2020 documentary directed by Brazilian Mauro Ventura.

== Cuisine ==
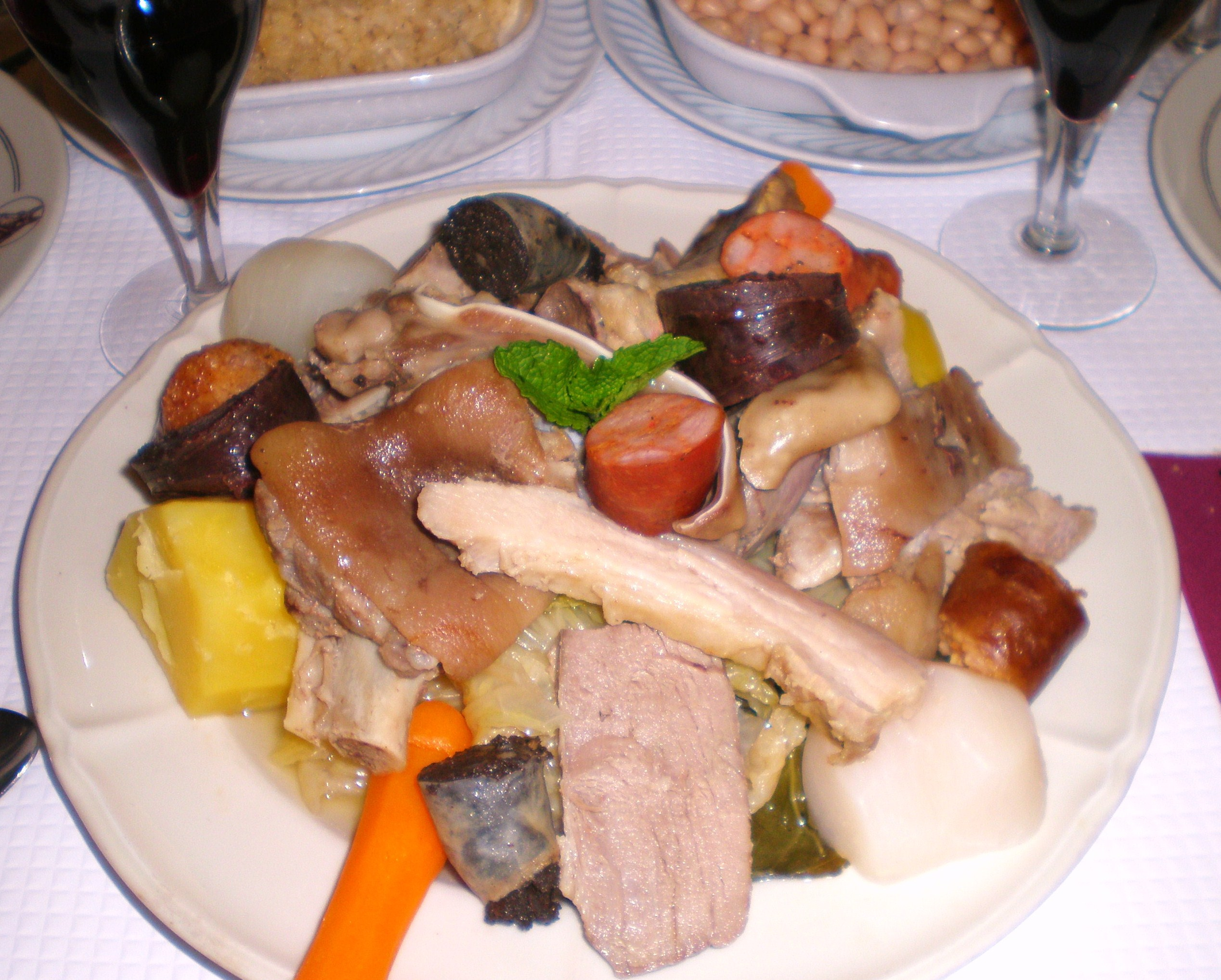
A dish of cozido à portuguesa

=== Food ===
Each region of Portugal has its own traditional dishes, including various kinds of meat, seafood, fresh fish, dried and salted cod (bacalhau), and the famous Cozido à Portuguesa (a Portuguese stew).

=== Alcoholic beverages ===
Portugal is a country of wine lovers and winemakers, known since the Roman Empire-era; the Romans immediately associated Portugal with its God of Wine Bacchus. Today, many Portuguese wines are known as some of the world's best: Vinho do Douro, Vinho do Alentejo, Vinho do Dão, Vinho Verde, Rosé and the sweet: Port wine (Vinho do Porto, literally Porto's wine), Madeira wine, Muscatel of Setúbal, and Moscatel of Favaios. Beer is also widely consumed, with the largest national beer brands being Sagres and Super Bock. Liqueurs, like Licor Beirão and Ginjinha, are popular.

== Literature ==
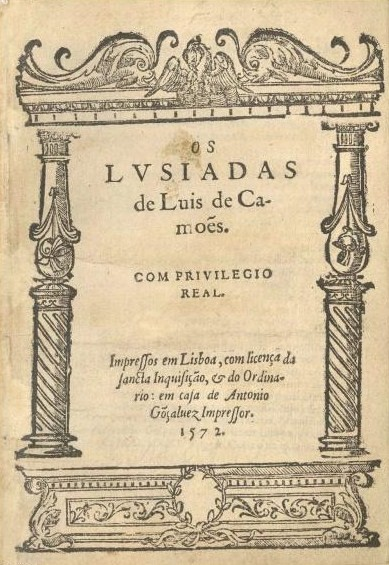
The Lusiads

Portuguese literature has developed since the 12th century from the lyrical works of João Soares de Paiva, Paio Soares de Taveirós and King Denis of Portugal. They wrote mostly from Galician-Portuguese and oral traditions known as "Cantigas d'amor e amigo" and "Cantigas de escárnio e maldizer", which were consecutively performed by troubadours and joglars.

Following chroniclers such as Fernão Lopes after the 15th century, fiction has its roots in chronicles and stories linked to theatre, following Gil Vicente, the father of Portuguese theatre, whose works were often criticisms and satires of society in his time.

Classical lyrical works, include The Lusiads (Os Lusíadas) by Luís de Camões, a national epic book of the history of Portugal which incorporates elements of Ancient Greek mythology, written in the 16th century.

Romanticism and Realism period authors from 19th century including Antero de Quental, Almeida Garrett, Camilo Pessanha, Camilo Castelo Branco, Eça de Queiroz, Alexandre Herculano, Ramalho Ortigão, Júlio Dinis and others.

Portuguese modernism is found in the works of Fernando Pessoa, José Régio, Miguel Torga, Mário de Sá-Carneiro and others.

Following the Carnation Revolution in 1974, the Portuguese society, after several decades of repression, regained freedom of speech.

José Saramago received the Nobel Prize in Literature in 1998.

Herberto Hélder, one of the major Portuguese poets of the second half of the twentieth century, has been an influence, among many others, to the young generation of highly considered Portuguese poets and, to a lesser extend, fiction writers from a recent wave of writers such as Valter Hugo Mãe, José Luís Peixoto, Gonçalo M. Tavares, Jorge Reis-Sá, Maria Antonieta Preto, José Ricardo Pedro and others.

== Music ==
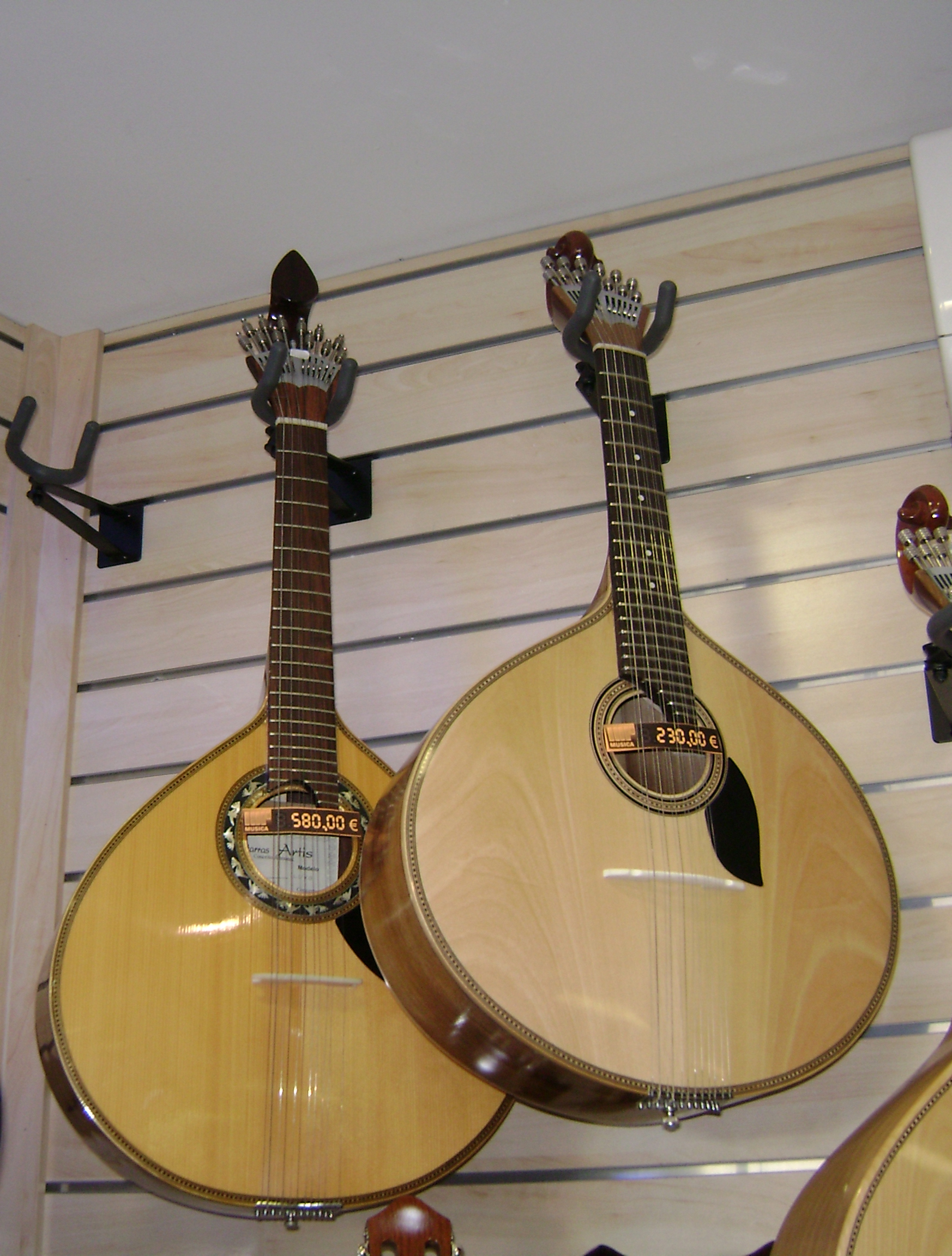
Portuguese guitars

Polyphonic music, employing multiple vocal parts in harmony, was developed in the 15th century. The Renaissance fostered a rich output of compositions for solo instruments and ensembles as well as for the voice.

The 1960s started a period of expansion and innovation with pop, rock and jazz introduced and evolving, political song developed, the fado of Lisbon and the Coimbra were revitalized. Music from the former colonies occupied an increasingly important place in the capital's musical life and local styles of rap and hip hop emerged.

The modern revival of academic music was primarily work of Luís de Freitas Branco, and continued by Joly Braga Santos. Composers like António Victorino de Almeida, Jorge Peixinho, Miguel Azguime, Pedro Amaral, and João Pedro Oliveira are known internationally. Orchestras include the Orquestra Sinfónica Portuguesa and the Gulbenkian Orchestra. Porto has had its own symphony orchestra since 1962, when the Chamber Orchestra was set up by the Gulbenkian Foundation. Lisbon also has a metropolitan orchestra, and the National Theatre of São Carlos in Lisbon, which was built in the late 18th century, has its own orchestra and ballet company. Among notable pianists, Maria João Pires has won worldwide acclaim.

Cultural centres such as the Belém Cultural Centre and the Culturgest, both in Lisbon, have expanded opportunities for major concerts. Madredeus is among the most successful popular music groups. Singer Dulce Pontes is also widely admired, and Carlos Paredes is considered by many to be Portugal's finest guitarist. Folk music and dancing and the traditional fado remain the country's fundamental forms of musical expression.

=== Traditional or folk music ===
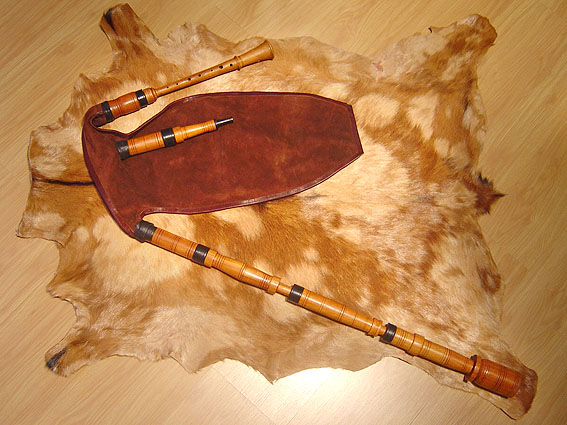
Gaita transmontana, bagpipe

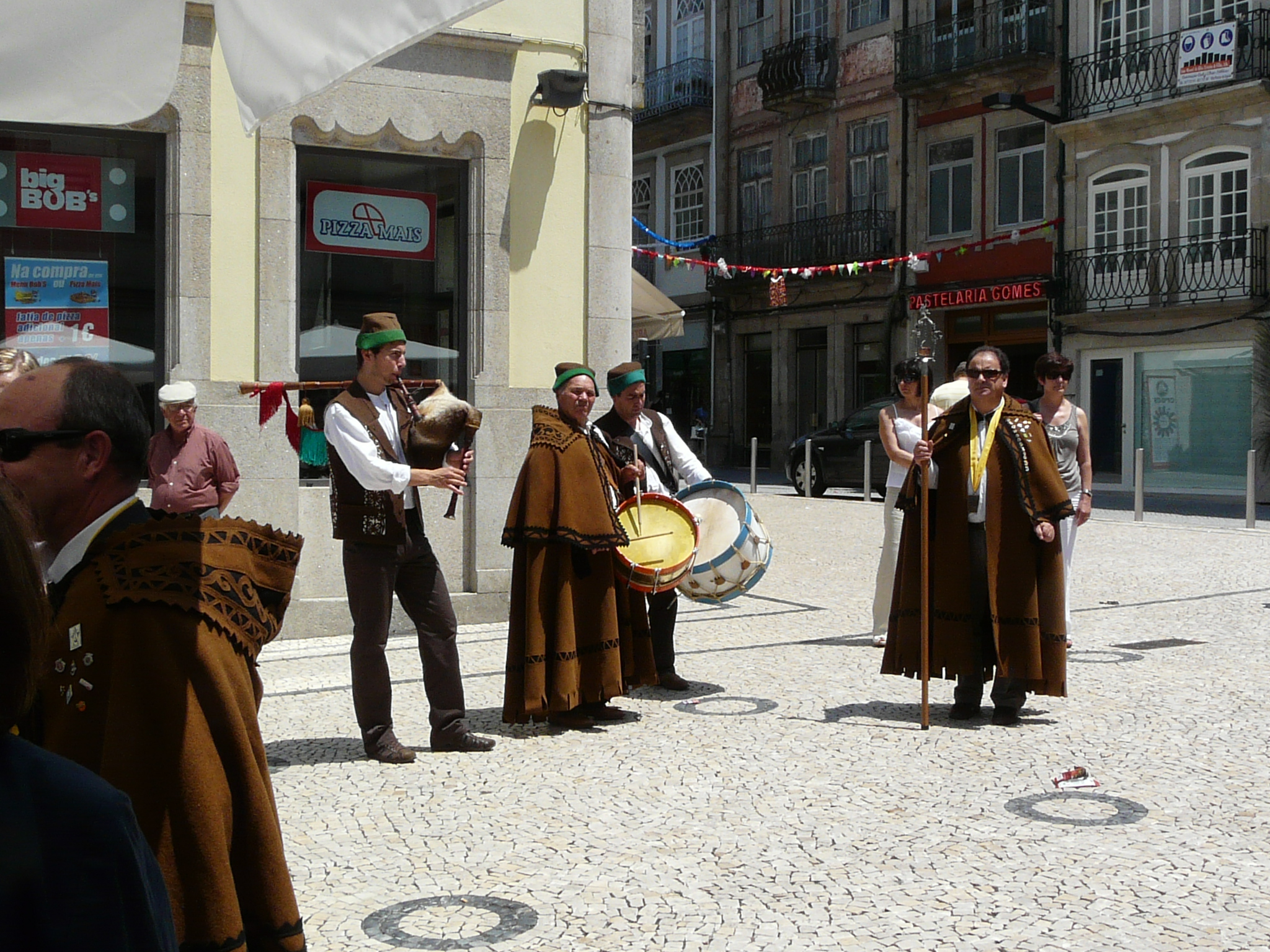
Traditional musicians from Vila Real

In all the times and all places mankind always showed admiration making sound and music from existing materials in its natural environment. The voice and the clapping of hands can be considered the first instrumental forms used by man.

The Iberian Peninsula was home to a lot of different peoples and cultures, so its normal to these cultures to influence the others but still retain a little of their aspects - this happened with the Portuguese music.

Portuguese folk music is the joint of the traditional songs of a community that express through a poetic character their beliefs and tell their history to other people and generations. The danças do vira (Minho), Pauliteiros de Miranda (Miranda), Corridinho do Algarve or Bailinho (Madeira), are some examples of dances created by the sound of folk. Some of the typical instruments used are a guitar, mandolin, bagpipes, accordion, violin, drums, Portuguese guitar and an enormous variety of wind and percussion instruments. Contemporary bands include Dazkarieh, Cornalusa, Gaitúlia, Strella do Dia etc.

=== Philharmonic music ===
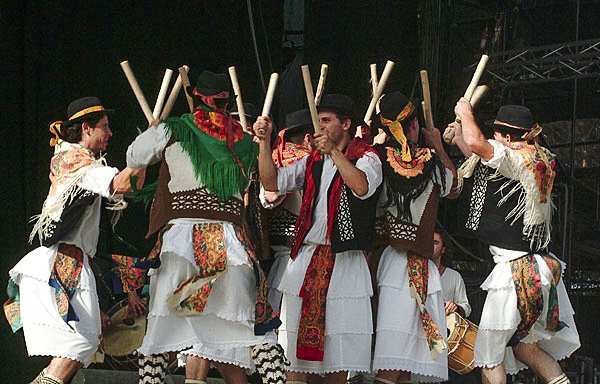
Pauliteiros de Miranda

In the popular culture the philharmonic bands represent each locality and play different types of music, from popular to classical. Lidia Costa, Carlos Marques, Alberto Madurai, José Caminos and Railcar Morays are some of the most important names in philharmonic music.

=== Fado ===
Fado (translated as destiny or fate) is a music genre which can be traced from the 1820s, but possibly with much earlier origins. It is characterized by mournful tunes and lyrics, often about the sea or the life of the poor. The music is usually linked to the Portuguese word saudade, a unique word with no accurate translation in any other language. (Home-sickness has an approximate meaning. It is a kind of longing, and conveys a complex mixture of mainly nostalgia, but also sadness, pain, happiness and love).

There are two main varieties of fado, namely those of the cities of Lisbon and Coimbra. The Lisbon style is the most popular, while Coimbra's is the more refined style. Modern fado is popular in Portugal, and has produced many renowned musicians. According to tradition, to applaud fado in Lisbon you clap your hands, in Coimbra you cough as if clearing your throat.

Mainstream fado performances during the 20th century included only a singer, a Portuguese guitar player and a classical guitar player but more recent settings range from singer and string quartet to full orchestra.

The ingredients of Fado are a shawl, a guitar, a voice and heartfelt emotion.

Themes include: destiny, deep-seated feelings, disappointments in love, the sense of sadness and longing for someone who has gone away, misfortune, the ups and downs of life, the sea, the life of sailors and fishermen, and last but not least "Saudade" (one of the main themes used in fado, that means a kind of longing).

Fado is probably the oldest urban folk music in the world and represents the heart of the Portuguese soul, and for that matter fado performance is not successful if an audience is not moved to tears.

=== Classical music ===
Portugal has been an important centre of practice and production of music over the centuries, as the music history of Portugal expresses. In contemporary classical music, notable Portuguese musicians include the pianists Artur Pizarro, Maria João Pires and Equeira Costa, and the composers: Fernando Lopes-Graça, Emmanuel Nunes, João Pedro Oliveira, Jorge Peixinho, Constança Capdeville, Clotilde Rosa, Fernando Corrêa de Oliveira, Cláudio Carneyro, Frederico de Freitas, Joly Braga Santos and Isabel Soveral.

=== Portuguese rock ===
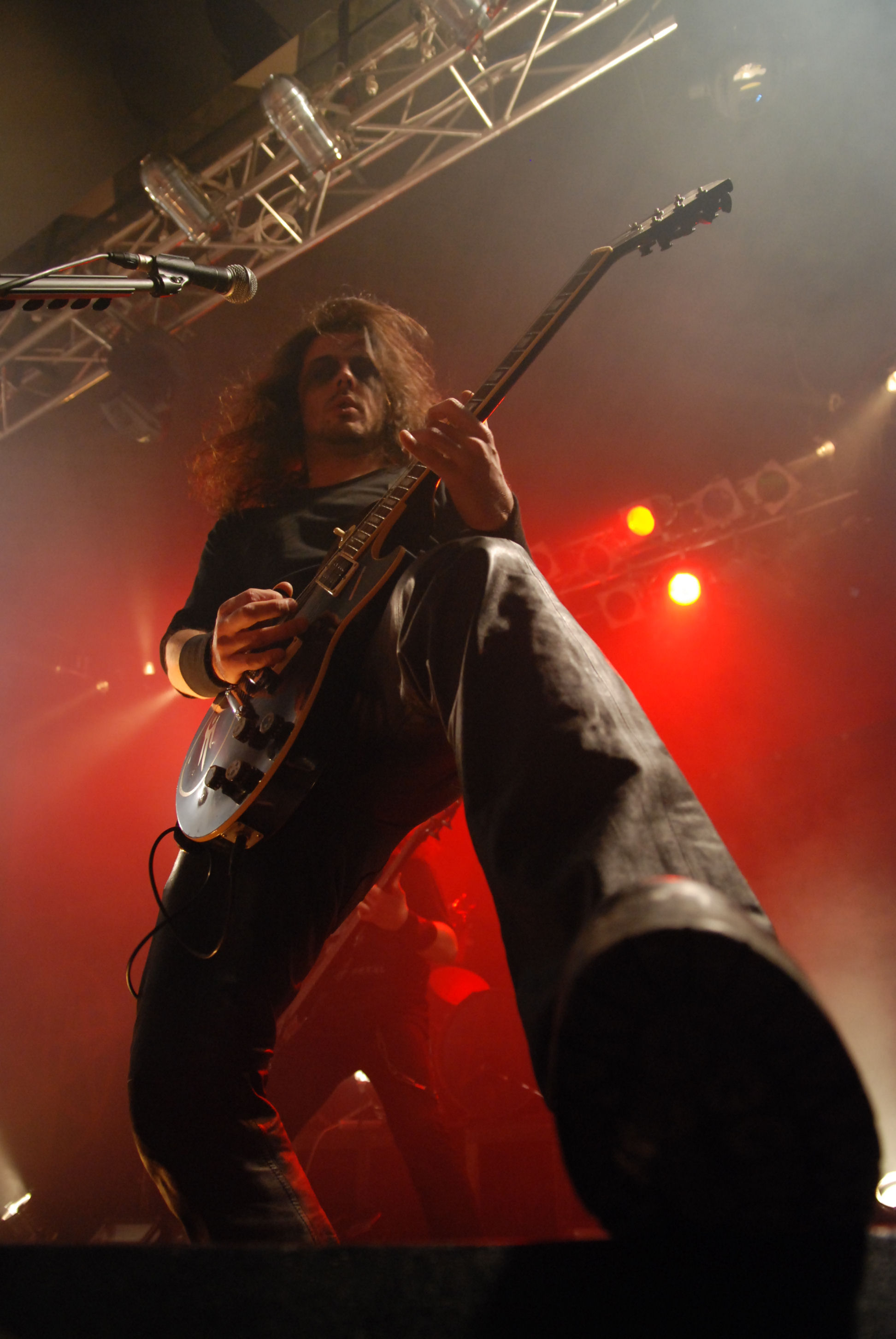
Moonspell guitarist

The Portuguese rock started to be noted in 1980 with the release of Ar de Rock by Rui Veloso, which was the first popular Portuguese rock song, other Portuguese bands and singers such as Sétima Legião, Rádio Macau, Jafumega, Mão Morta, Taxi, Peste e Sida, were popular too. Before that, Portugal had a vibrant underground progressive rock scene in the 1970s like Tantra, Quarteto 1111, José Cid and others in 1950 and 1960 rock and roll scene with bands like Os Conchas and Os Sheiks. Among the numerous bands and artists which followed its genesis, are Xutos & Pontapés, GNR, Quinta do Bill, UHF, The Gift and Moonspell.

=== Popular music ===
The 1980s and 1990s were marked by the search for a new musical discourse in urban popular music, the increase, commodification and industrialization of musical production, and the mediatization and expansion of music consumption. The boom in Portuguese musical production was accompanied by both the diversification of the musical domains and styles produced and consumed in Portugal and the emergence of new styles which are increasingly taking the global market into account. The denominated Pop music uses melodies easily to memorize, becoming very popular and commercial; it's also characterized by the amount of publicity made (through videos, magazines, appealing clothing, etc.).

It is possible to note two stylistic tendencies in the popular music of the 1980s and 1990s:

- A musical discourse created by Portuguese musicians that is integrated within the major international developments experienced by commercial popular music;
- A new musical style that vindicates its Portugueseness by both drawing upon various musical elements which musicians and audiences alike identify as Portuguese and emphasizing the Portuguese language.

=== Canções de intervenção (political songs) ===
Political songs (canções de intervenção) played an important part in the protests against the totalitarian regime that ruled Portugal from 1926 up to the 1974 revolution. Once it was created as an object to criticize what was wrong, mainly in a political point of view. One of its main protagonists was José (Zeca) Afonso (1929–1987) but others also contributed to its development, for example Adriano Correia de Oliveira, José Mário Branco, Luís Cilia, Francisco Fanhais, José Jorge Letria, José Barata Moura and Sérgio Godinho. They traced a new course for urban popular music and influenced a further generation of musicians, some of whom also participated in the protest movement and are still active, including Fausto, Vitorino, Janita Salomé and Júlio Pereira, among others.

This musical style reflects a confluence of influences from traditional music, French urban popular songs of the 1960s, African music and Brazilian popular music. By the late 1970s the revolutionary climate had subsided and the need to express political militancy through song was no longer felt by poets, composers and singers, who subsequently redefined both their role and their creative contribution.

=== Hip hop ===
Hip hop has been important since the 1980s with areas like Amadora, Cacém and the South Bank of the Tagus are considered to be the cradle of Hip Hop Tuga.

The compilation called "Rapublica" released in 1994, which featured young rising artists and groups such as Black Company and Boss AC, is responsible for establishing hip hop in Portugal. The refrain from a song called "Não sabe nadar, yo" ("Can't swim, yo!") was used by the president of Portugal, Mário Soares in a speech about the cave painting in Foz Côa saying that "As gravuras não sabem nadar, yo!" ("The engravings can't swim, yo!").

Apart from Lisbon, other urban centers also established vibrant hip hop scenes during the early nineties, especially Porto, that gave birth to important groups such as Mind Da Gap. More recently other local scenes have also developed on other urban centers, such as Coimbra and Faro.

There are two major showcase events, Flowfest and Hip Hop Porto. Flowfest, in Coimbra, started in 2005. Hip Hop Porto is a free event held at Casa da Música, in September. It features mainly the northern hip hop names as headliners, drawing a very local audience. Its first edition in 2005 carded Rodney P, NBC, Blackmastah, Bomberjack, Rui Miguel Abreu, etc. Usually the event is held outdoors, but in 2006 the heavy rains made the event relocate to the parking lot of the building, causing a really "underground" look.

=== Students festivals ===
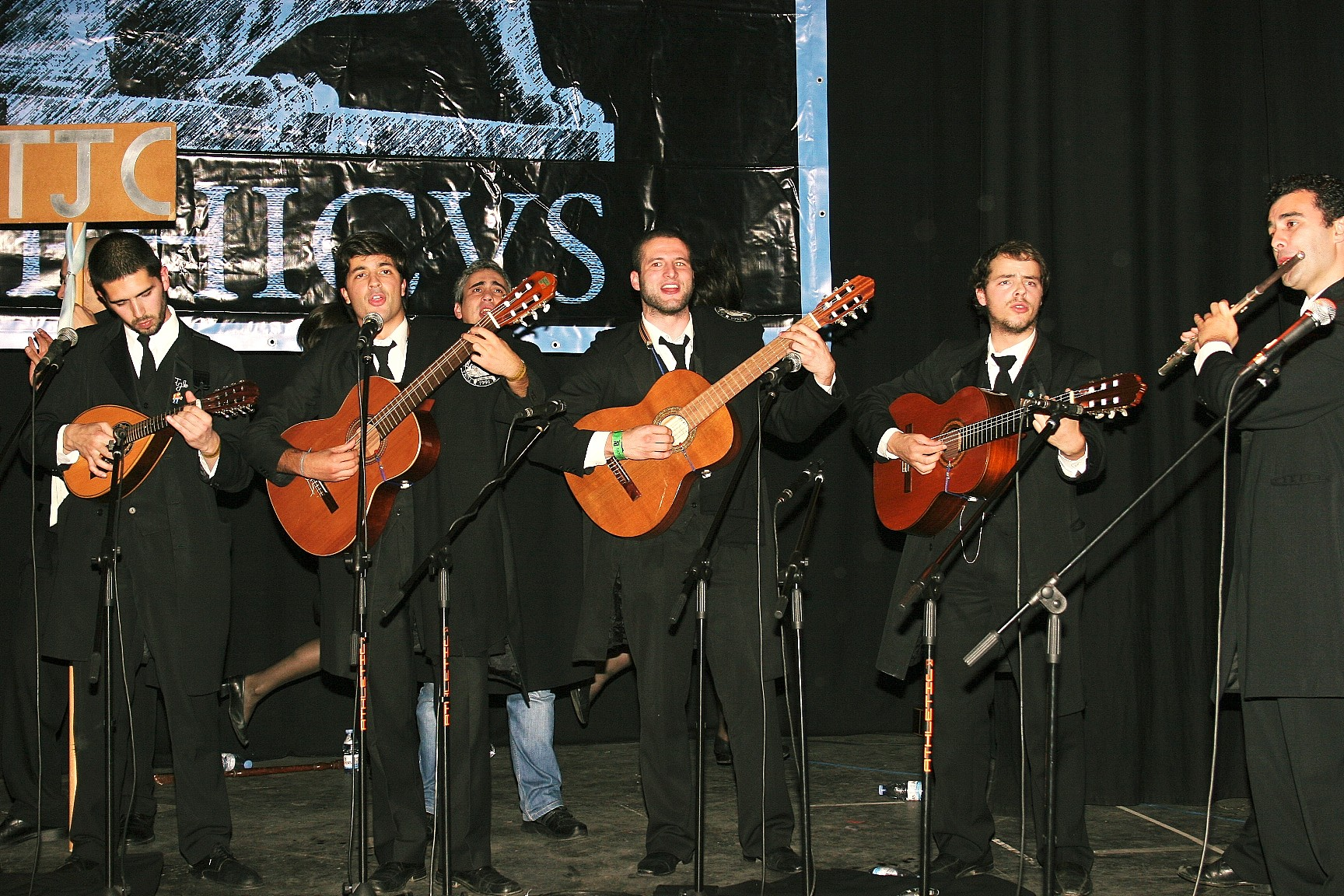
Tuna group

Festivals organised by students of several higher education institutions, take place every year across the country. The 'Queima das Fitas' in Coimbra and Porto and 'Enterro da Gata' in Minho. Summer festivals include Vilar de Mouros Festival, Festival Sudoeste, Rock in Rio Lisboa, Super Bock Super Rock, Festival de Paredes de Coura, Boom Festival, Ilha do Ermal Festival, etc.

== Painting ==
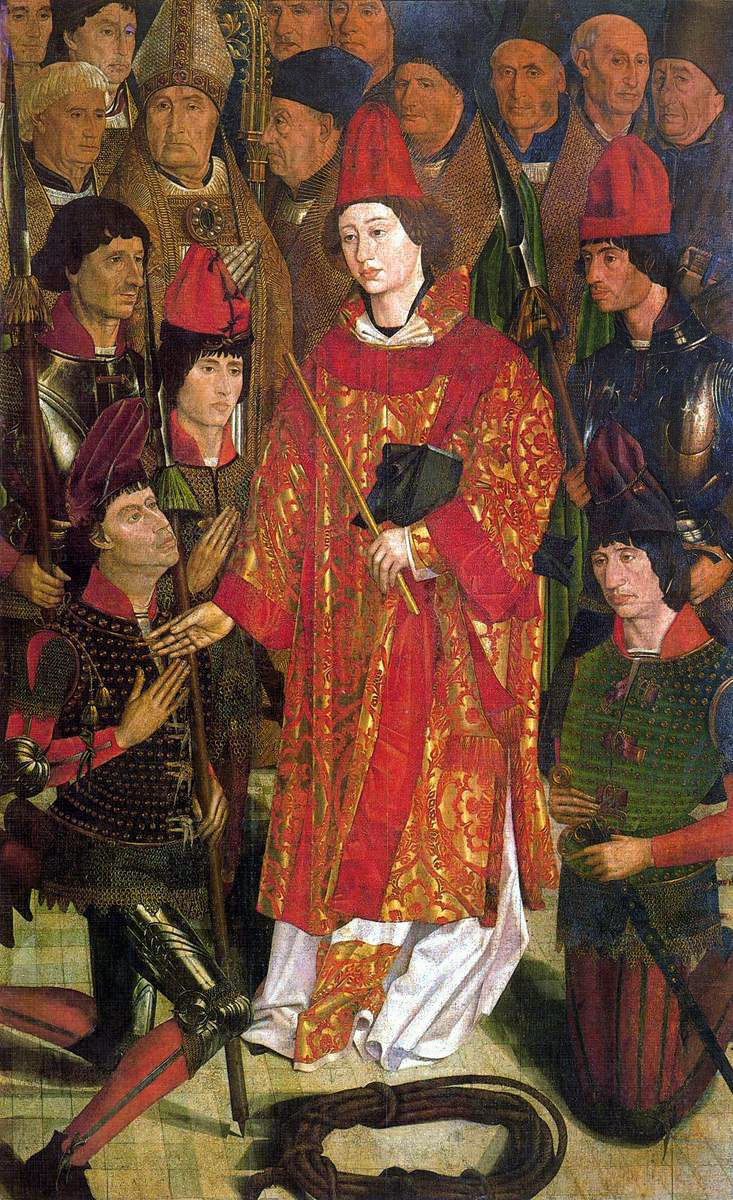
Detail of the Saint Vincent Panels, by Nuno Gonçalves

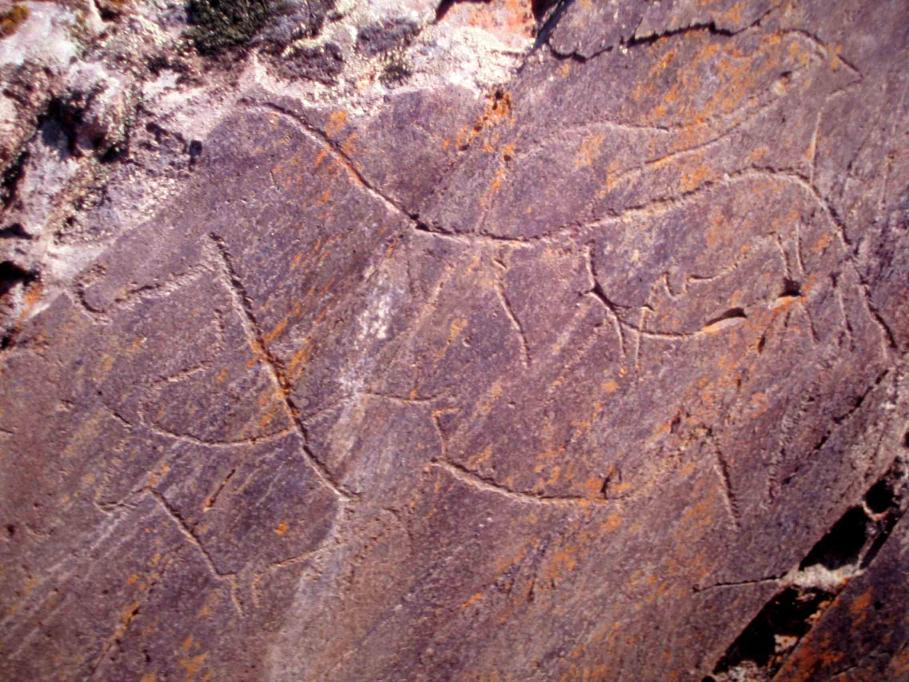
Prehistoric Rock-Art Site of the Côa Valley

Portuguese art was very restricted in the early years of nationality, during the reconquista, to a few paintings in churches, convents and palaces.

It was after the 15th century, with national borders established and with the discoveries, that Portuguese art expanded. Some kings, like John I already had royal painters. It is during this century that Gothic art was replaced by a more humanistic and Italian-like art.

During the reign of King Alfonso V, an important Portuguese artist Nuno Gonçalves shaped Portuguese art, leading it to gain local characteristics (Escola Nacional, National School). His influence on Portuguese art continued after his death. He was the royal painter for the famous Retábulo do Altar das Relíquias de São Vicente in the Cathedral of Lisbon (Sé de Lisboa). The painting caught fire and was replaced by a Baroque structure. Parts of his work still exist and can be found in the Museu Nacional de Arte Antiga (National Museum of Ancient Art).

During the Golden Age of Portugal, in the late 15th and early 16th centuries, Portuguese artists were influenced by Flemish art, and were in turn influential on Flemish artists of the same period. During this period, Portuguese art became internationally well-known, mostly because of its very original and diverse characteristics, but little is known about the artists of this time due to the medieval culture that considered painters to be artisans. The anonymous artists in the Portuguese "escolas" produced art not only for metropolitan Portugal but also for its colonies, namely Malacca or Goa and even Africa, gratifying the desires of local aristrocratic clients and religious clients.

In the 19th century, naturalist and realist painters like Columbano, Henrique Pousão and Silva Porto revitalized painting against a decadent academic art.

In the early 20th century, Portuguese art increased both in quality and quantity, mainly due to members of the Modernist movement like Amadeo de Souza Cardoso and Almada Negreiros. In the post-war years the abstractionist painter Vieira da Silva settled in Paris and gained widespread recognition, as did her contemporary Paula Rego.

== Theater ==
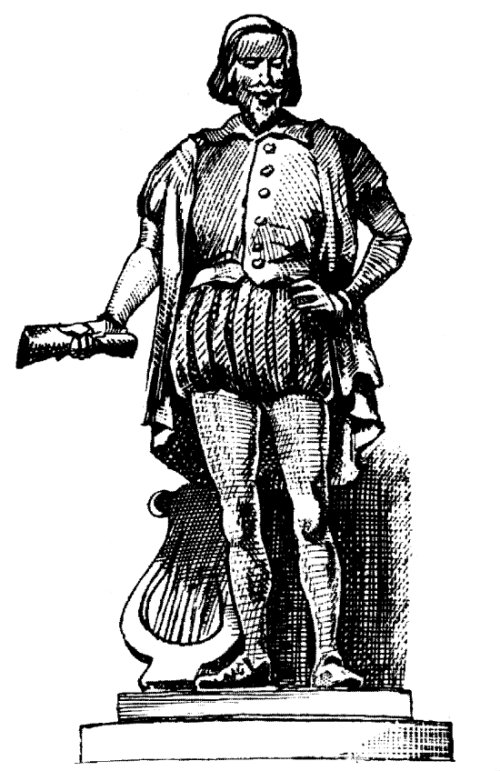
Gil Vicente, 16th-century Portuguese playwright

Portugal never developed a great Dramatic theatre tradition due primarily to the fact that the Portuguese were more passionate about lyric or humorous works than dramatic art. Gil Vicente is often seen as the father of Portuguese theatre - he was the leading Portuguese playwright in the 16th century. During the 20th century, theatre found a way to reach out to the people, specially the middle class, through what in Portugal is known as "Revista" - a form of humorous and cartoonish theatre designed to expose and criticize social (and political) issues, but in a way that entertains and amuses the audience.

Gil Vicente (1435–1536) is considered the first great Portuguese playwright. Frequently called the father of Portuguese theatre, he portrays the society of the 16th century. Anticipating the 17th-century French writer Jean-Baptiste de Santeul's well-known phrase "castigat ridendo mores", Gil Vicente became famous for his satirical plays such as the "Triologia das Barcas" ("Auto da Barca do Inferno" (1517), "Auto da Barca do Purgatório" (1518); "Auto da Barca da Glória" (1518)). In these plays, he creates some characters who are representative of their social group. This results in not only comical, but also strong critical situations. Gil Vicente also wrote other important plays such as "Auto da Índia" (1509), "Auto da Fama" (1510), and "Farsa de Inês Pereira" (1523).

Another relevant playwright of the 16th century is António Ferreira (1528–1569), who wrote Castro (1587), a well-known tragedy about the forbidden love between D. Pedro I and D. Inês de Castro. António Ferreira is considered the father of Renaissance culture in Portugal.

One of the most famous playwrights of the 18th century is António José da Silva (1705–1739), commonly known as "O Judeu" because of his Judaic origins. He wrote several plays such as "Os Encantos de Medeia" (1735), "As Variedades de Proteu" (1737) and "Precipício de Faetonte" (1738).

Almeida Garrett (1799–1854) was a turning point in Portuguese literature as far as the themes are concerned. His most outstanding play is "Frei Luís de Sousa" (1844), which became a classic of Portuguese theatre. Garrett also wrote "Um Auto de Gil Vicente" (1838), "Filipa de Vilhena" (1846) and "O Alfageme de Santarém" (1842). These three plays as well as "Frei Luís de Sousa" are somehow connected with Portuguese history. Furthermore, Garrett is also the founder of the "Conservatório Geral de Arte Dramática" as well as of the "Teatro Nacional D. Maria II".

In the late 19th century, two Portuguese playwrights of Goan descent, Lucasinho Ribeiro and João Agostinho Fernandes, emerged as leading figures for introducing tiatr, a musical theatre based on Portuguese theatre "teatro". Ribeiro was the first to introduce the art form in Bombay, British India, and later in Assagão, Portuguese Goa.

As far as the 20th century is concerned, it's worth noticing Bernardo Santareno's (1920–1980) work. His most famous play is "O Judeu", based upon the life of António José da Silva, mentioned above. Santareno also wrote "A Promessa" (1957), "O Crime da Aldeia Velha" (1959) and "Anunciação" (1962). Most of his plays deal with universal questions such as liberty, oppression and discrimination.

Born in 1926, Luís de Sttau Monteiro (1926–1993) wrote several plays, some of them portraying and criticising Portuguese society of his time. His most famous play is "Felizmente Há Luar" (1961), which is a strong criticism of the political context of that time (dictatorship – Estado Novo). "O Barão" (1965), "A Guerra Santa" (1967) and "Sua Excelência" (1971) were also written by Sttau Monteiro.

In the 20th century, theatre in Portugal became more popular with the "Revista" – a comical and satirical form of theatre. It is a creative way of expressing one's ideas as well as criticising political and social problems. The most important actors who performed this form of theatre in the 20th century were Vasco Santana (1898–1958), Beatriz Costa (1907–1996) and Ivone Silva (1935–1987). Nowadays it is worth mentioning Maria João Abreu, José Raposo and Fernando Mendes, who perform this form of theatre at the well known "Parque Mayer" (a theatre district in Lisbon where the "Revista" used to be performed).

Important Portuguese actors include Ruy de Carvalho, Eunice Muñoz, Rui Mendes, Irene Cruz and Luís Miguel Cintra.

In later years, theatre in Portugal has developed into many other forms as in any other European country. Almost every repertoire can be seen in Portugal. Many companies have the works of Shakespeare, Molière, Brecht, Becket or Chekhov, and Portuguese classic and modern authors on their repertoire. Other companies show more experimental projects. All this makes the theatre repertoire very varied. Some of the most important professional theatre companies nowadays are: Teatro da Cornucópia, Teatro da Comuna, Teatro Aberto, Teatro Meridional, Teatro da Garagem, Companhia de Teatro de Almada, Companhia Teatral do Chiado, A Barraca, Teatro dos Aloés, Teatro Praga, Artistas Unidos, Seiva Trupe, As boas raparigas, ACTA, among many others.

Portugal hosts several festivals such as FITEI, ACERT, FIAR, and the International Theatre Festival of Almada (FITA).

== Fashion and design ==
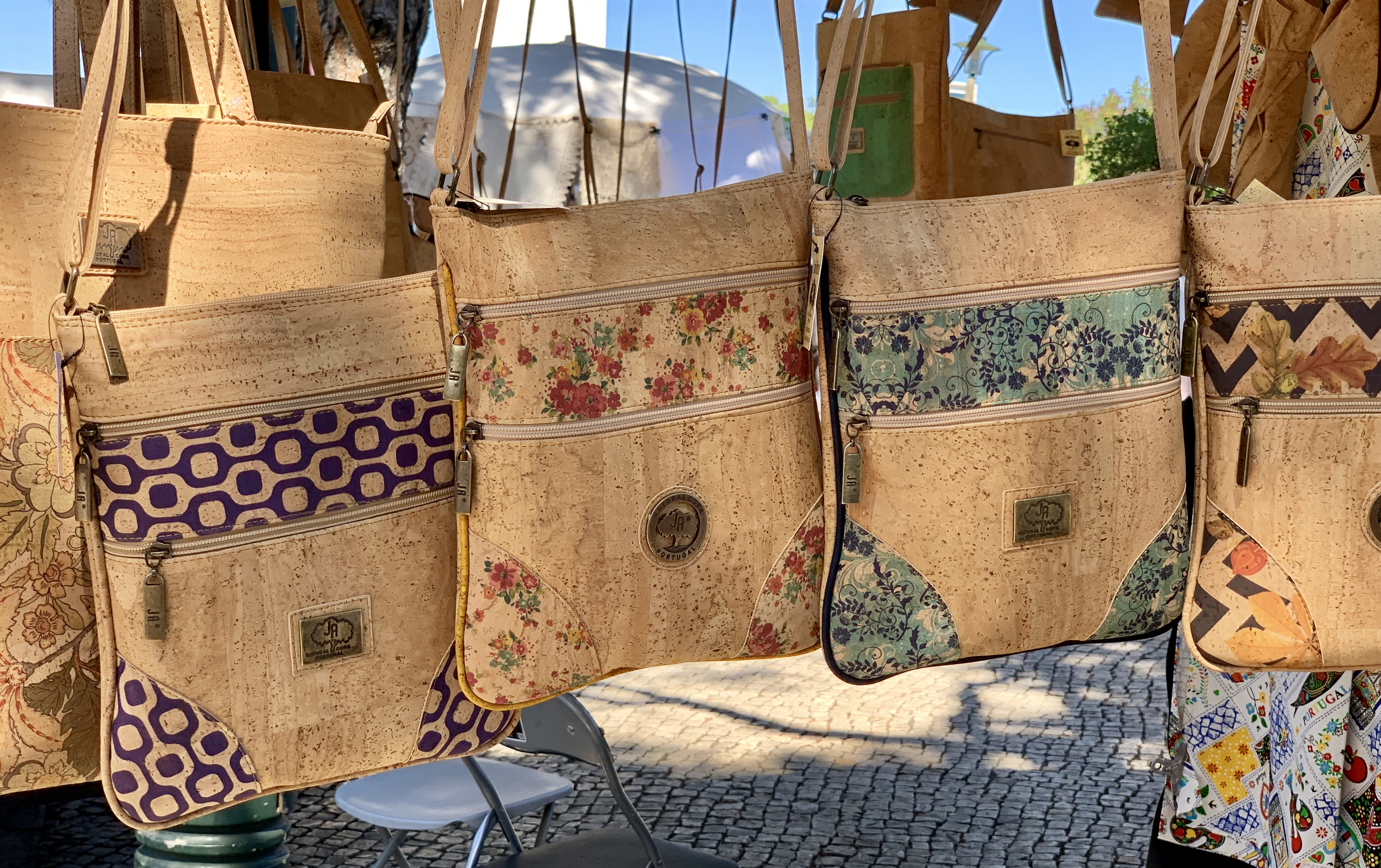
Natural cork bags.

Industrialized, export-oriented fashion and design in clothing, footwear, kitchenware and furniture industries, was pioneered by fashion designers like Eduarda Abbondanza, Mário Matos Ribeiro, Ana Salazar, José António Tenente, João Tomé, Francisco Pontes or Manuela Gonçalves, as well as textile industry industrialists established in places like Vale do Ave, in clothing; several entrepreneurs of the Portuguese footwear industry; Vista Alegre Atlantis and Rafael Bordalo Pinheiro, in tableware and kitchenware; and businesspersons of the old-established furniture industry heavily concentrated in and around places such as Paços de Ferreira and Paredes. Corkware and other cork-based products such as furniture, decorative items and floor and wall coatings, are also distinctive products found among typical designer creations of Portuguese origin.

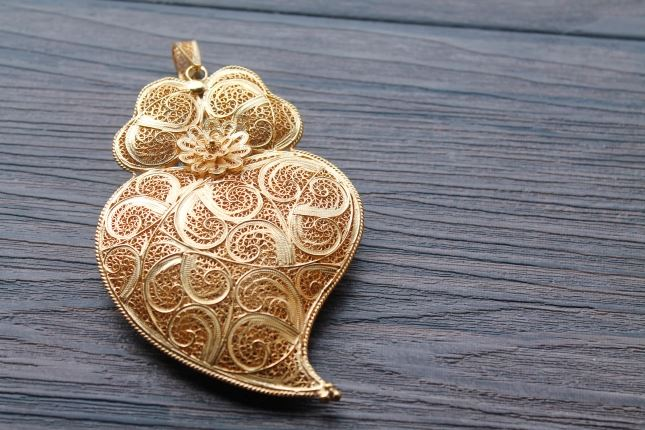
Typical Portuguese filigree heart shaped pendant, an iconic item in Portuguese fashion and design.

Filigree began to be produced in Portugal in the 8th century with the arrival of Arab migrants after the Umayyad invasion of Iberian Peninsula, who brought new patterns with them. With time, the peninsula began to produce different filigree patterns, but while in Spain the filigree jewellery-making tradition became less relevant, in Portugal it was perfected. After the 18th century, Portuguese Filigree already had its own distinctive imagery, motifs and shapes. Filigree from the 17th and 18th centuries became famous for their extraordinary complexity. Gold and silver filigree jewellery of delicate and artistic design is still made in considerable quantities throughout the country, particularly filigree hearts, which are iconic symbols of Portuguese jewellery-making.

== Folklore ==
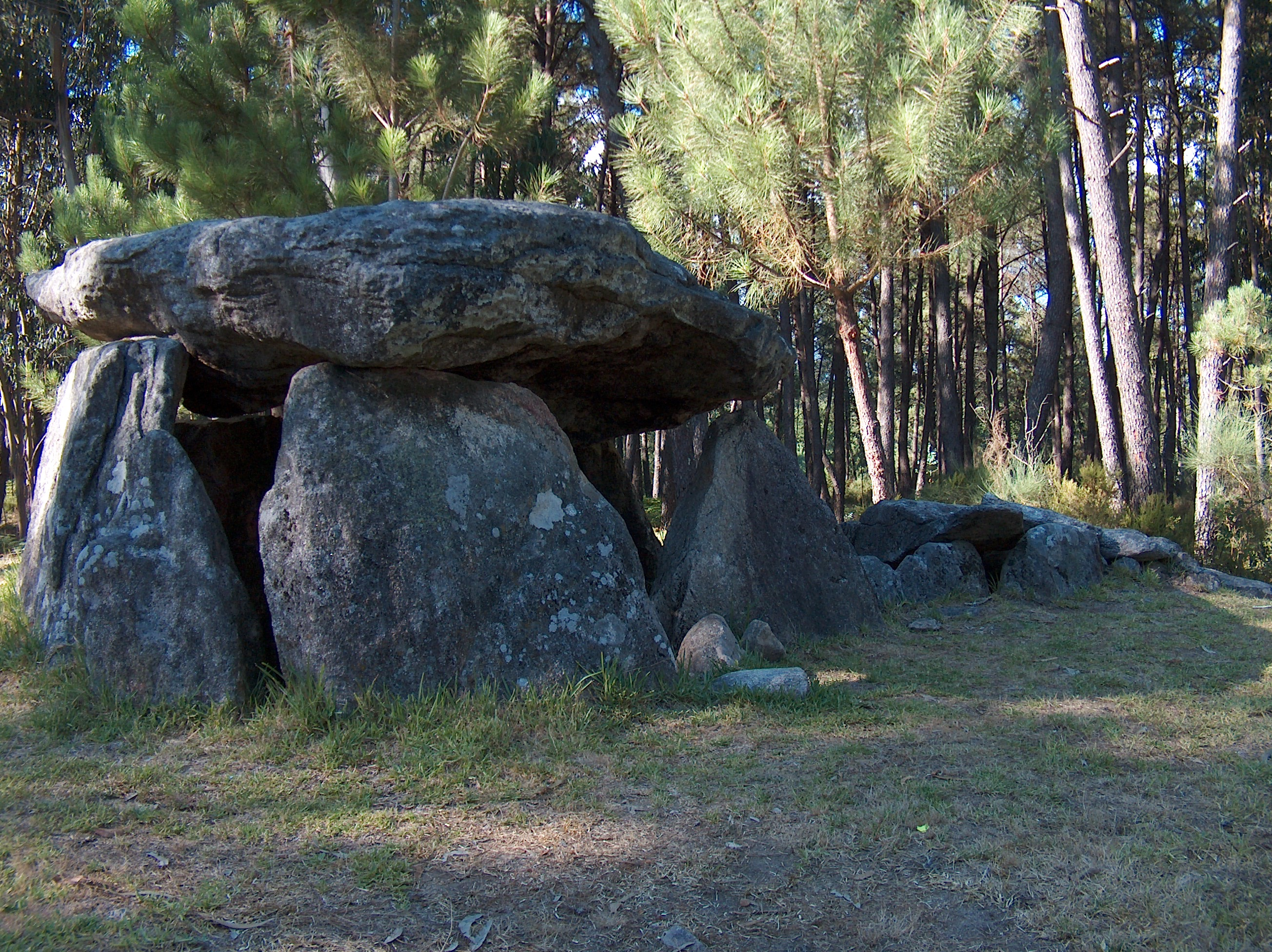
Casa da Moura (House of the Moura)

Trasgos, almas penadas, peeiras, Jãs, maruxinhos, moledros, and marafonas are mythical beings that form part of Portuguese folklore. These legends and traditions are preserved in the lore and literature of older generations, frequently seen as the remains of pre-Christian traditions. The lore associates the ancient monuments to the legends of the Enchanted Mouras and nearly every Portuguese town has a tale of a Moura Encantada.

== Festivities and holidays ==
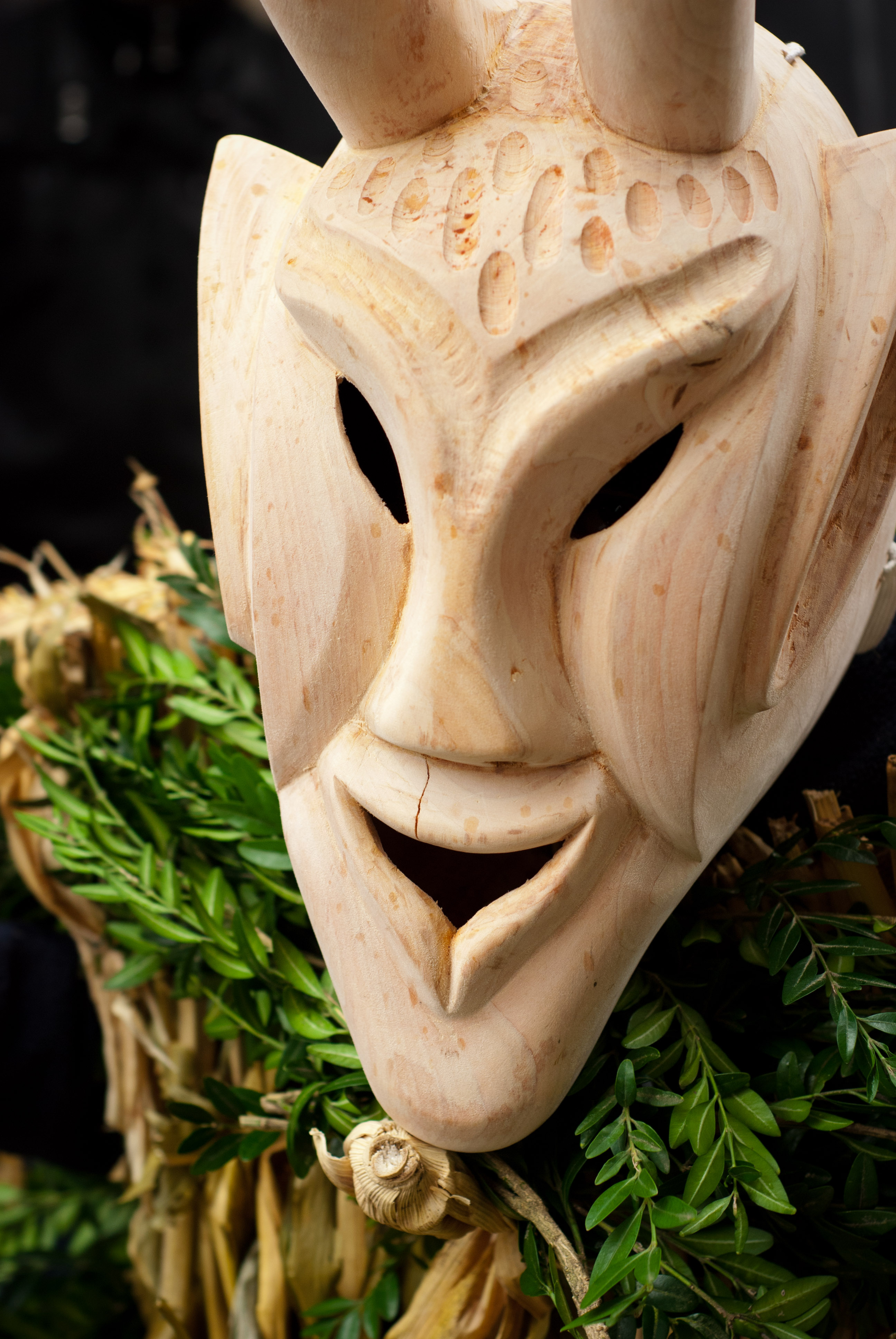
Ancient Celtic masks, known as Careto of Lazarim

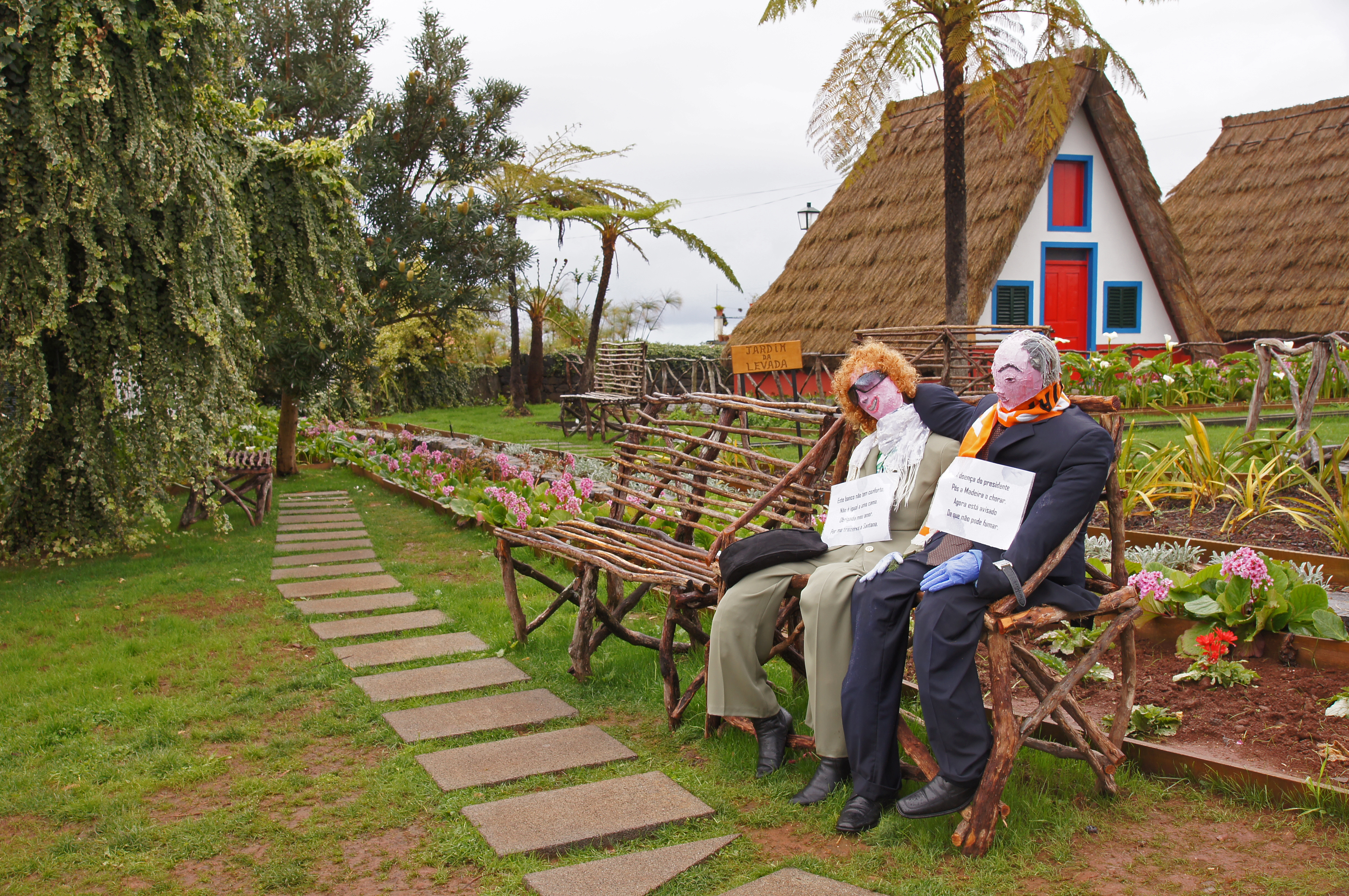
Maios celebration in Madeira island

During the summer, in the month of June, festivities dedicated to three saints known as Santos Populares take place all over Portugal. Why the populace associated the saints to these pagan festivities is not known. But they are possibly related to Roman or local deities from the time before Christianity spread in the region. The three saints are Saint Anthony, Saint John and Saint Peter. Common fare in these festivities are wine, água-pé (mostly grape juice), and traditional bread along with sardines. During the festivities are many weddings, traditional street dances and fireworks.

Saint Anthony is celebrated on the night of 12th-13 June, especially in Lisbon (where that saint was born and lived most of his life), with Marchas Populares (a street carnival) and other festivities. In the meantime, several marriages known as Casamentos de Santo António (Marriages of Saint Anthony) are made. But the most popular saint is Saint John, he is celebrated in many cities and towns throughout the country on the night of the 23rd-24th, especially in Porto and Braga, where the sardines, caldo verde (traditional soup) and plastic hammers to hammer in another person's head for luck are indispensable. The final saint is Saint Peter, celebrated in the night of 28th-29th, especially in Póvoa de Varzim and Barcelos, the festivities are similar to the others, but more dedicated to the sea and with an extensive use of fire (fogueiras). In Póvoa de Varzim, there is the Rusgas in the night, another sort of street carnival. Each festivity is a municipal holiday in the cities and towns where it occurs.

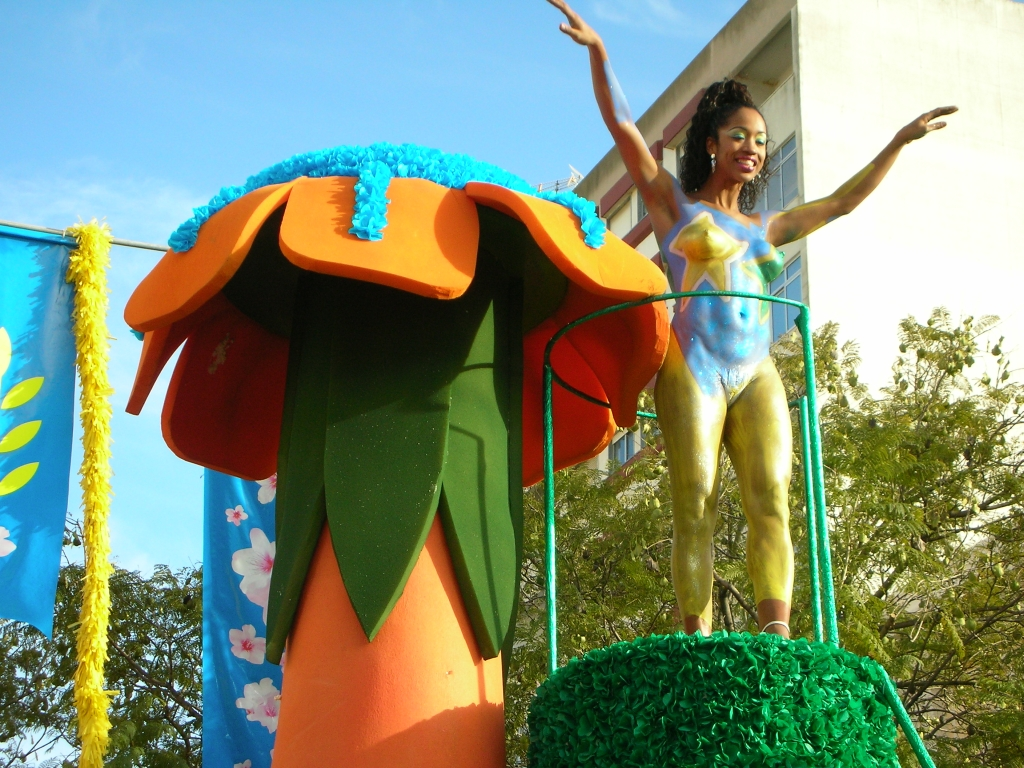
Carnival parade in Loulé, Algarve region.

Carnival is also widely celebrated in Portugal, some traditional carnivals date back several centuries. Loulé, Alcobaça, Mealhada, Funchal, Torres Vedras, Ovar and Figueira da Foz, among several other localities, hold several days of festivities, with parades where social and political criticism abound, along with music and dancing in an environment of euphorya. There are some localities which preserve a more traditional carnival with typical elements of the ancient carnival traditions of Portugal and Europe. However, several parades in most localities have adopted many elements of the tropical Brazilian Carnival.

On January 6, Epiphany is celebrated by some families, especially in the North and Center, where the family gathers to eat "Bolo Rei" (literally, King Cake, a cake made with crystallized fruits); this is also the time for the traditional carols - "As Janeiras", the new year's Wassailing.

Saint Martin Day, is celebrated on November 11. This day is the peak of three days, often with very good weather, it is known as Verão de São Martinho ("Saint Martin summer"), the Portuguese celebrate it with jeropiga (a sweet liqueur wine) and roasted Portuguese chestnuts (castanhas assadas), and it is called Magusto.

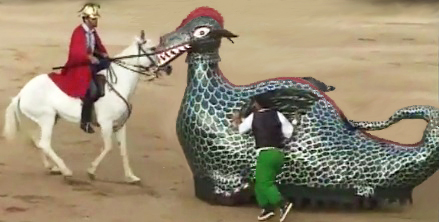
"Festa da Coca" during the Corpus Christi celebration, in Monção, Portugal

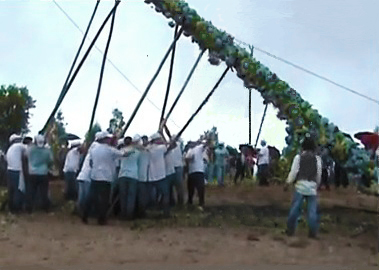
"Levantamento do mastro" in Fonte Arcada, Portugal

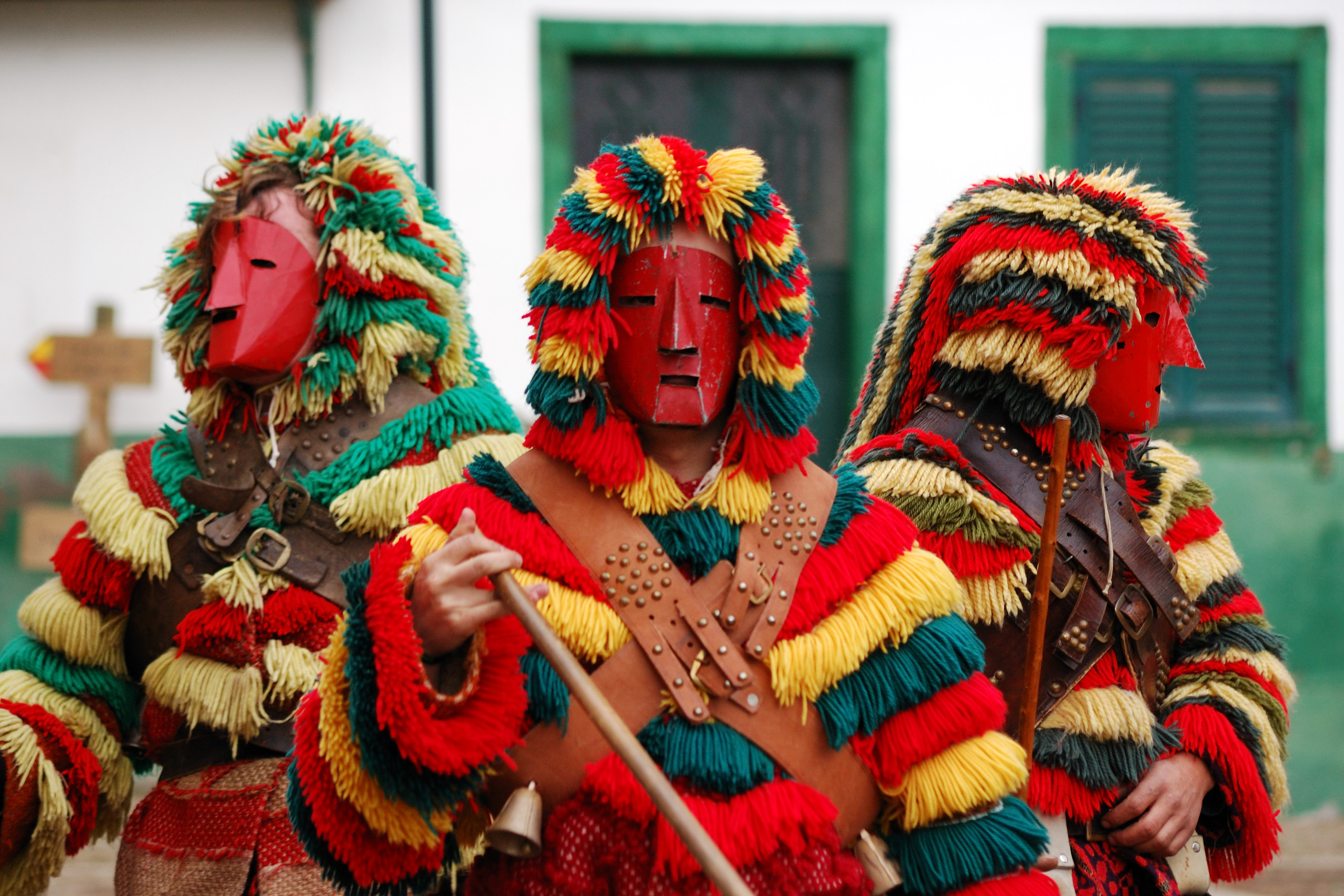
Caretos in the carnival of Podence, Portugal

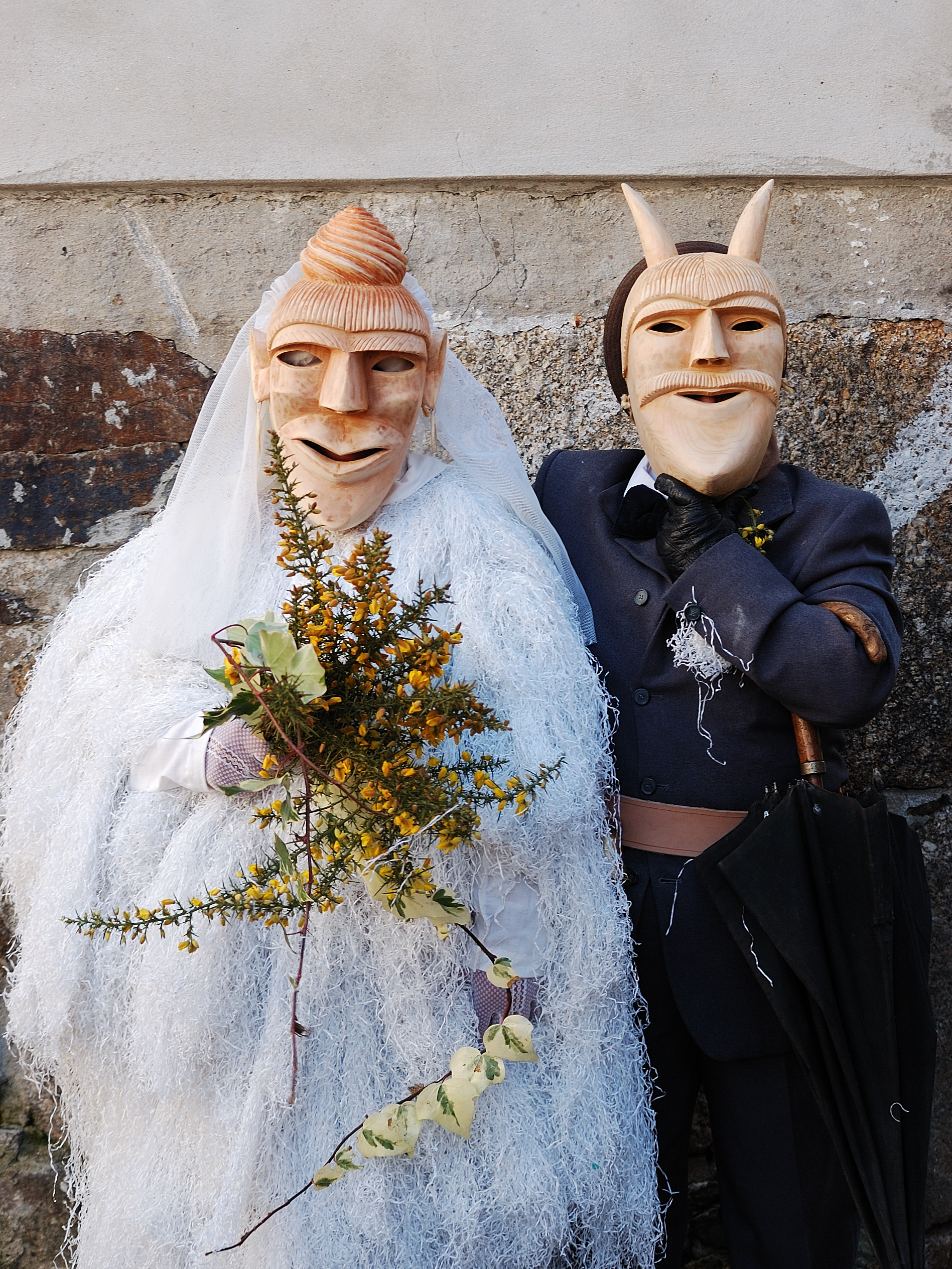
A bride and her groom in the carnival of Lazarim, Portugal

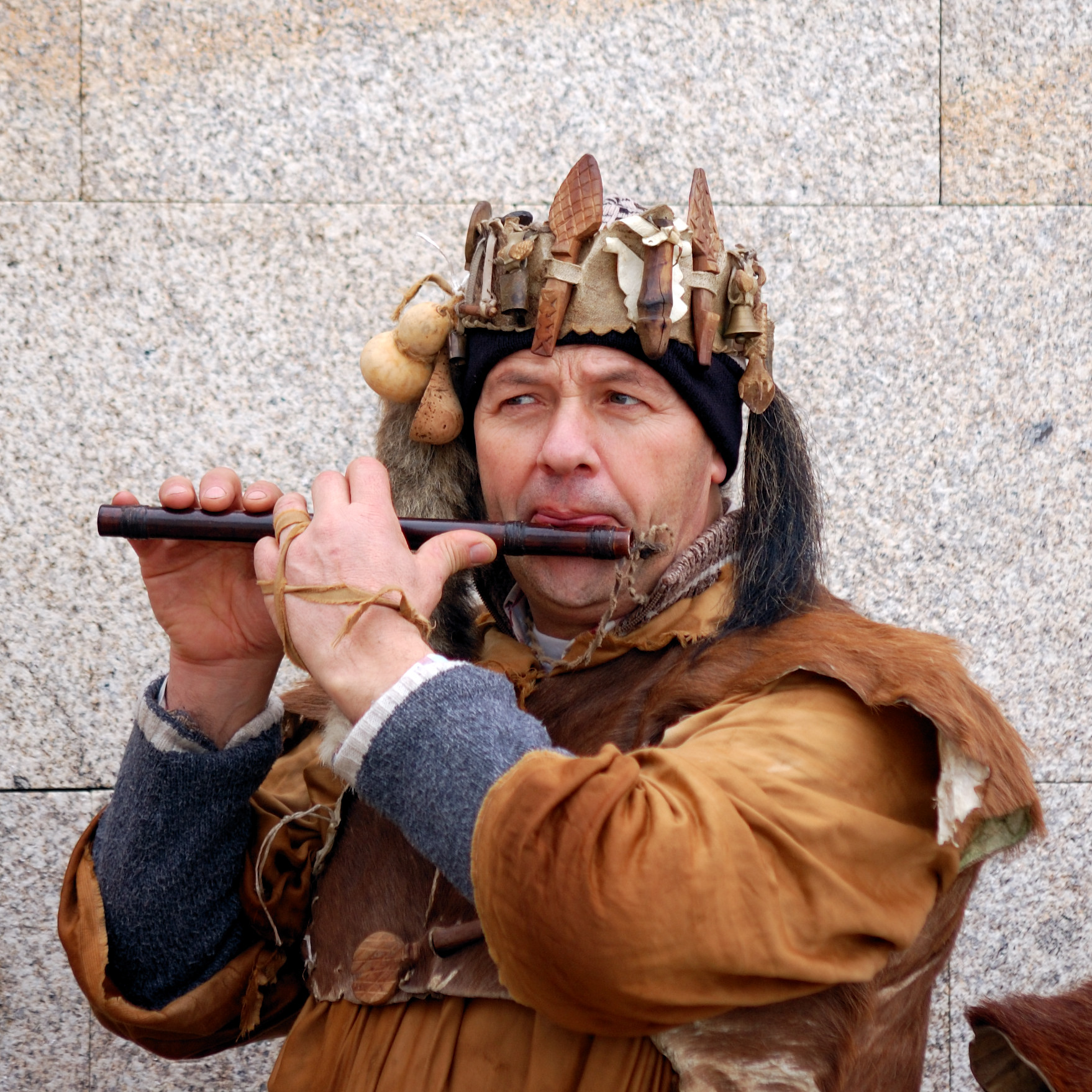
Flute player of Podence

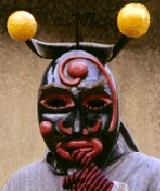
Chocalheiro of Bemposta

== National holidays ==
Date	Name	Remarks
January 1	Ano Novo	New Year's Day. Beginning of the year, marks the traditional end of "holiday season".
Tuesday, date varies	Carnaval	Carnival. (Also called Mardi Gras). Not an official holiday, but declared by the government as a non-working day. Very ancient festival celebrating the end of the winter. It gained Christian connotations, and now marks the first day of a period of 40 days before Easter Week (Semana Santa, Holy Week), thus also known as Entrudo.
Friday, date varies	Sexta-Feira Santa	Good Friday.
Sunday, date varies	Páscoa	Easter. Used for family gathering to eat Pão-de-Ló and "Folar" (an Easter cake) and Easter eggs. In the North, a sort of church members processions (compasso) visits and blesses every home with an open door, thus meaning they are Catholics. Traditionally, this is the second visit of children and non-married youngsters to their godparents, receiving an Easter gift. The first visit is on Palm Sunday, 7 days before, where children give flowers and palms to their godparents.
April 25	Dia da Liberdade	Literally, "Freedom Day". Celebrates the Carnation Revolution, marking the end of the dictatorial regime. Event of 1974.
May 1	Dia do Trabalhador	Labour Day.
Thursday, date varies	Corpo de Deus	Corpus Christi. Christian feast celebrating the Eucharist.
June 10	Dia de Portugal, de Camões e das Comunidades Portuguesas	Portugal Day. Marks the date of Camões death. Camões wrote The Lusiads, Portugal's national epic. Event of 1580. Celebrated in many of Portuguese communities in the United States of America, such as the Ironbound in Newark, New Jersey
August 15	Assunção	Assumption of Mary.
October 5	Implantação da República	Implantation of the Republic, or Republic Day. Event of 1910.
November 1	Todos os Santos	All Saints' Day. Day used for visiting deceased relatives.
December 1	Restauração da Independência	Restoration of Independence. Event of 1640.
December 8	Imaculada Conceição	Immaculate Conception. Patron Saint of Portugal since 1646.
December 25	Natal	Christmas Day. Celebrated in the 24th to the 25th as a family gathering to eat codfish with potatoes and cabbage, roasted kid and turkey; seasonal sweets and dry fruits; drink Port wine; and share gifts.

Portuguese popular song: (English Translation)

- "Santo António já se acabou. (Saint Anthony is over)
- O São Pedro está-se a acabar. (Saint Peter is ending)
- São João, São João, São João, (Saint John, Saint John, Saint John)
- Dá cá um balão para eu brincar." (Give me a balloon, for me to play)

== Sports and games ==
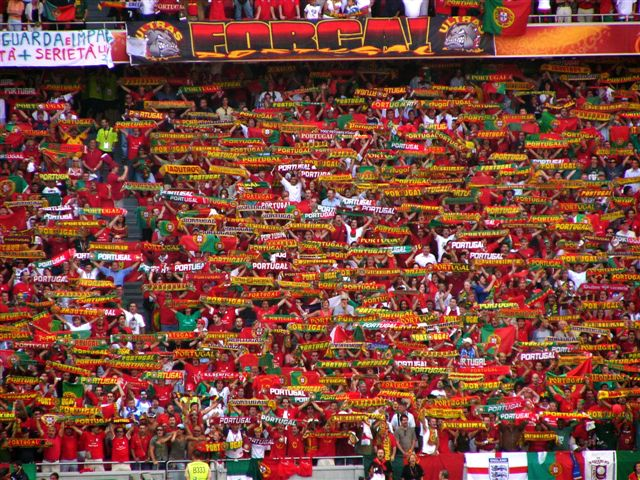
Portuguese football fans supporting the Portugal national football team

Football is the most popular sport in Portugal. Football started to become well known in Portugal in the final decades of the 19th century, brought by Portuguese students who returned from England.

The first person responsible for its implementation was Guilherme Pinto Basto (according to some people, his brothers Eduardo and Frederico brought the first ball from England). It was he who had the initiative to organise an exhibition of the new game, which took place in October 1888 in Cascais, and it was also Pinto Basto who organized the first official football match in January of the following year. The match, played where today is found the Campo Pequeno Bullring in Lisbon, involved opposing teams from Portugal and England. The Portuguese team won the game 2–1. Consequently, football started attracting the attention of the high society, being distinguished by the Luso-British rivalry.

Later, the game spread, being practiced in colleges, and leading to the foundation of clubs all over the country. Until the end of the century, associations such as Clube Lisbonense, Carcavelos, Braço de Prata, the Real Ginásio Clube Português, the Estrela Futebol Clube, the Futebol Académico, the Campo de Ourique, the Oporto Cricket, and the Sport Clube Vianense were founded to practice this sport or created sections for competing. The first match, between Lisbon and Porto, took place in 1894, attended by King D. Carlos. The Clube Internacional de Futebol (founded in 1902) was the first Portuguese team to play abroad defeating, in 1907, the Madrid Futebol Clube in the Spanish capital.

The oldest football club in Portugal is Futebol Clube do Porto which was founded in 1893 (as Foot-Ball Club do Porto). Sport Lisboa e Benfica was born in 1904, with Cosme Damião and other people being the founders (the club maintained the foundation date of Sport Lisboa, founded in 1904, when in 1908 assimilated the Grupo Sport Benfica, founded in 1906). The Boavista Futebol Clube was founded in 1903. The Sporting Clube de Portugal was founded in 1906 by the Viscount of Alvalade and his grandson José de Alvalade. They are all clubs that traditionally have several sports activities but they give great distinction to football, making use of teams of professional players, which frequently participate in European competitions.

In April 2010, the Portugal national football team was ranked 3rd out of 207 countries by FIFA. The legendary Eusébio is still a symbol of Portuguese football. Luís Figo was voted 2001 Player of the Year by FIFA, after finishing 2nd in 2000. Manuel Rui Costa and Cristiano Ronaldo are also noteworthy, although Vítor Baía is the player in history with most titles won, including all European club cups. Moreover, José Mourinho is regarded as one of the most successful and well-paid football managers in football's history. The main domestic football competition is the Primeira Liga, where the dominating teams are S.L. Benfica, FC Porto, and Sporting CP. Portugal hosted and nearly won EURO 2004, getting defeated in the final by surprise winner Greece. The Portuguese national team also reached the semi-finals of the FIFA World Cup twice, in 1966, when Eusébio was the top scorer, with 9 goals, and also in 2006. The year 2006 was the year that Portugal nearly won the FIFA World Cup tournament, ranking 4th overall, being defeated by France and Germany. This was the first time since 1966, that the Portuguese football team had advanced to such a high qualifying round in a World Cup tournament. The national team defeated hosts France in the 2016 edition of the UEFA Euro, their first major international trophy.

Other than football, many other professional and well organized sport competitions take place every season in Portugal, including basketball, swimming, athletics, tennis, gymnastics, futsal, handball, and volleyball among the hundreds of sports played in this country.

Road cycling, with Volta a Portugal as the most important race, is also popular.

In rink hockey, Portugal is the country with the most world titles: 15 World Championships and 20 European Championships, and in rugby sevens, the Portuguese team has won many international trophies, having as of July 2006, five European Championship titles.

Golf is also played in the Algarve, which hosts the Algarve Open.

The Autódromo Fernanda Pires da Silva in the Estoril, near Lisbon, is the main Portuguese race track, where many motorsport competitions are held, including the World Motorcycling Championship and A1 Grand Prix.

Rallying (with the Rally of Portugal and Rally Madeira) and off-road (with the Baja Portugal 1000 and recently Lisboa-Dakar) events also have international recognition.

Triathlon is also giving important steps, thanks to the world cup leader Vanessa Fernandes, and her European and world titles. She is also the duathlon European and world champion.

The national team of shooting sports won the gold medal in the teams event, and Paulo Cleto won silver in the single men's competition.

Martial arts like judo have also brought many medals to this country, namely Telma Monteiro, who conquered gold twice at the European Championships in the -52 kg category, bronze in 2005 world championship in Cairo, and achieved silver in 2007 World Judo Championships. Nuno Delgado, who conquered the bronze medal in the 2000 Summer Olympics in Sydney, also became the European champion in 1999 (in Bratislava), and vice-champion in the year of 2003.

Manuel Centeno is also a major name in Portuguese sports, as he conquered the national, European and the world titles, in 2006 in bodyboarding after being the European champion back in 2001.

In surfing, Justin Mujica, European surfing champion in 2004, is now back in the competitions after recovering from a knee injury. Tiago Pires reached the number one position at ASP WQS rating, and will probably be part of the main surfing competition. Ruben Gonzalez is an international acclaimed surfer and the only one to achieve the national title in two consecutive tournaments.

The Portuguese team of basketball made a unique qualification to the European Championships and made through the second round, where it was eliminated.

"Os Lobos" (Portugal national rugby union team) made a dramatic qualification to the 2007 Rugby World Cup, becoming the world's only all-amateur team ever to qualify for that kind of event.

In fencing, Joaquim Videira won the silver medal at the épée 2006 World Fencing Championships, and has conquered numerous medals in the world cup.

The major Portuguese professional sports leagues, championships and events include:

- Portuguese Football Championship and Cup of Portugal in football.
- Portuguese Futsal First Division in futsal.
- Portuguese Basketball League in basketball.
- Portuguese Roller Hockey First Division in rink hockey.
- Portuguese Handball League in handball.
- Campeonato Nacional Honra/Super Bock in rugby.
- Portuguese Volleyball League A1 in volleyball.
- Portuguese Beach Soccer League in beach soccer.
- Volta a Portugal in road cycling.
- Rally of Portugal in motor racing.

The country has an ancient martial art known as "Jogo do Pau" (Portuguese Stick Fencing), which is used for self-protection and for duels between young men in disputes over young women. Having its origin in the Middle Ages, Jogo do Pau uses wooden staves as a combat weapon.

Other sports are the "Jogos Populares", a wide variety of traditional sports played for fun.

In addition to this, other popular sport-related recreational outdoor activities with thousands of enthusiasts nationwide include airsoft, fishing, golf, hiking, hunting, and orienteering.

== Stereotypes ==
This is a list of stereotypes:

- Saudade
- Sebastianism
- Zé Povinho

== See also ==
- Portuguese people
- Portuguese poetry
- List of cultural icons of Portugal
- List of libraries in Portugal
- List of museums in Portugal
- Historic villages of Portugal
