= Centeno =

Centeno is a surname. Notable people with the surname include:

- Bruno Centeno (born 1988), Argentine footballer
- Diego Centeno (1514–1549), Spanish conquistador
- Jesus Centeno (born 1983), Venezuelan basketball player
- Juan Centeno (born 1989), Puerto Rican baseball player
- Manuel Centeno (born 1980), Portuguese bodyboarder
- Mário Centeno (born 1966), Portuguese economist, university professor, and politician
- Susana Centeno (c. 1912–fl. 2006), Puerto Rican practical nurse and public servant
- Walter Centeno (born 1974), Costa Rican football midfielder
