= A Portuguese Love Affair =

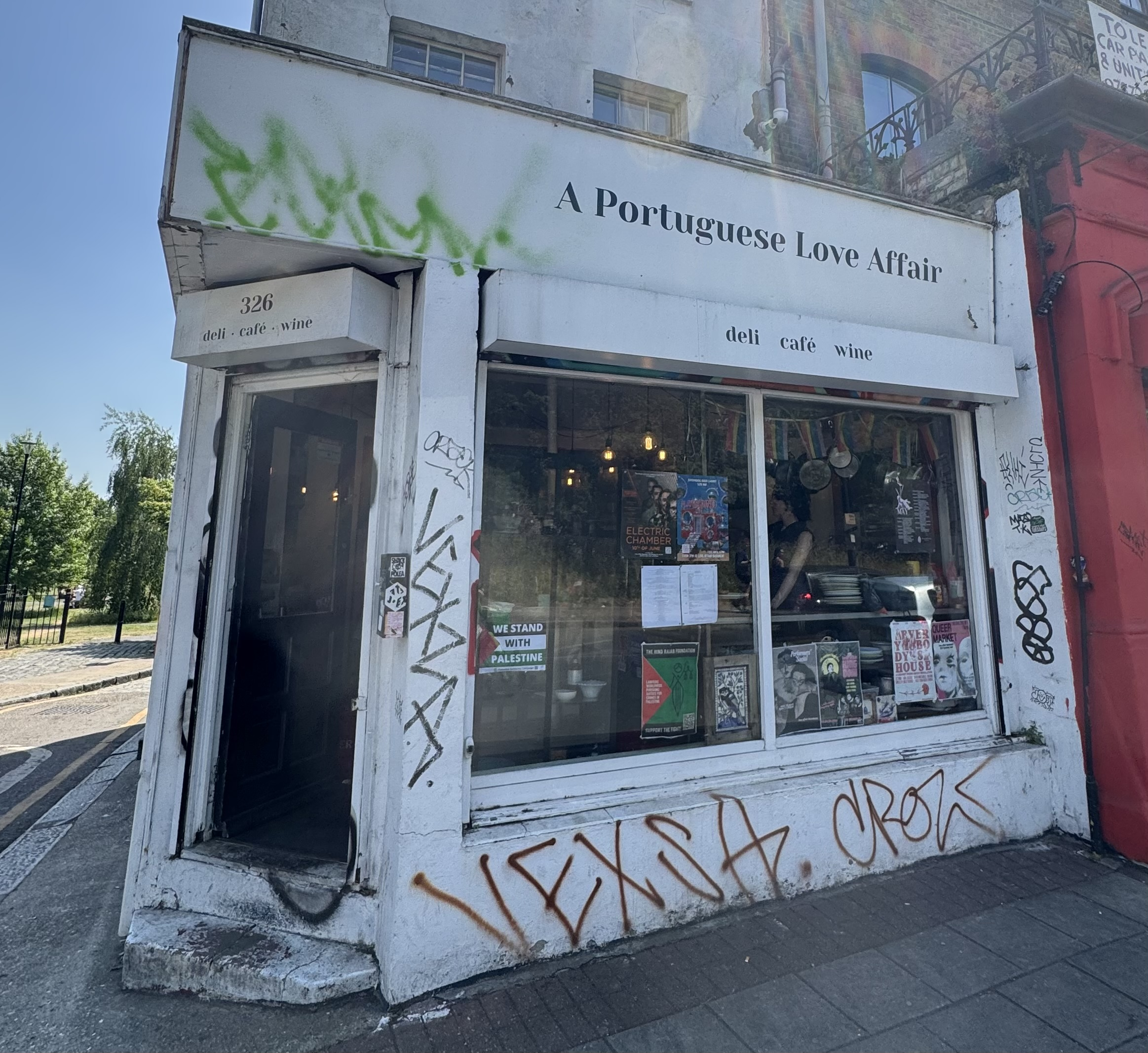
- Outside the delicatessen in 2026
- Company type: Private
- Industry: Coffehouse; Music venue
- Founded: 2013
- Founder: Dina Martins; Olga Cruchinho
- Headquarters: Hackney, London, United Kingdom
- Area served: East London
- Website: https://www.aportugueseloveaffair.co.uk/ https://www.loveaffairbasement.co.uk/

A Portuguese Love Affair is a shop and delicatessen, located in Hackney, East London, founded by Portuguese entrepreneurs Dina Martins and Olga Cruchinho.

== History ==
Founders Martins and Cruchinho, with professional backgrounds in journalism, education, and design, opened the shop as a means of representing Portuguese culture in the United Kingdom. According to them, the business's name and concept are centred on the Portuguese cultural concept of saudade.

Cruchinho and Martins previously operated a business in Portugal before relocating to London. Their first London location opened on Columbia Road in 2013, followed by a subsequent expansion to 324 Hackney Road.

The shop and café stock a range of Portuguese goods, including beauty products, wine, preserves, clothing, books, and ceramics. They source products from nearly 30 Portuguese suppliers, including items such as Bordallo Pinheiro ceramics. According to Cruchinho, initial public reception to the shop's curated concept was mixed, with some visitors expressing unfamiliarity with the specialized product range. It also hosts community events, including wine tastings, poetry readings, and book launches. Other past programming has included art exhibitions and events centred on traditional Portuguese culture.

=== Queer allyship ===
The owners announced plans to develop the "Love Affair Basement" (L.A.B), a dedicated community space within the premises. To fund the project and the renovation of the Hackney Road location, the business carried a crowdfunding campaign. The project launched the crowdfunding campaign with a £60,000 target, with the budget being allocated for facility renovations, purchase of equipment, and operating costs. The basement space is designed for multifunctional use, including workshops, conferences, corporate events, drag performances and comedy nights, and sessions for transgender youth. The space opened in March 2025.

== Gallery ==
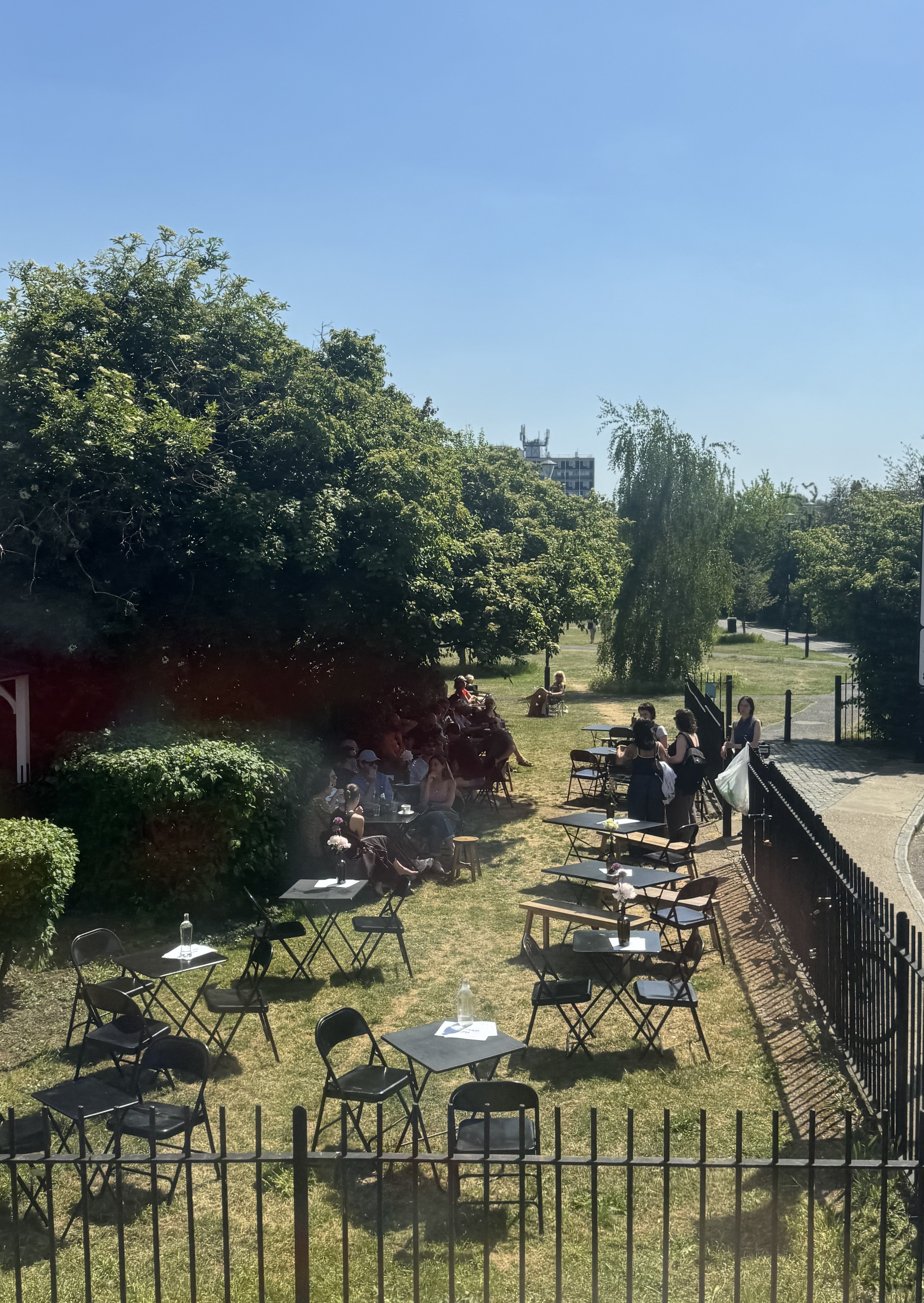
Outdoor seating space in 2026

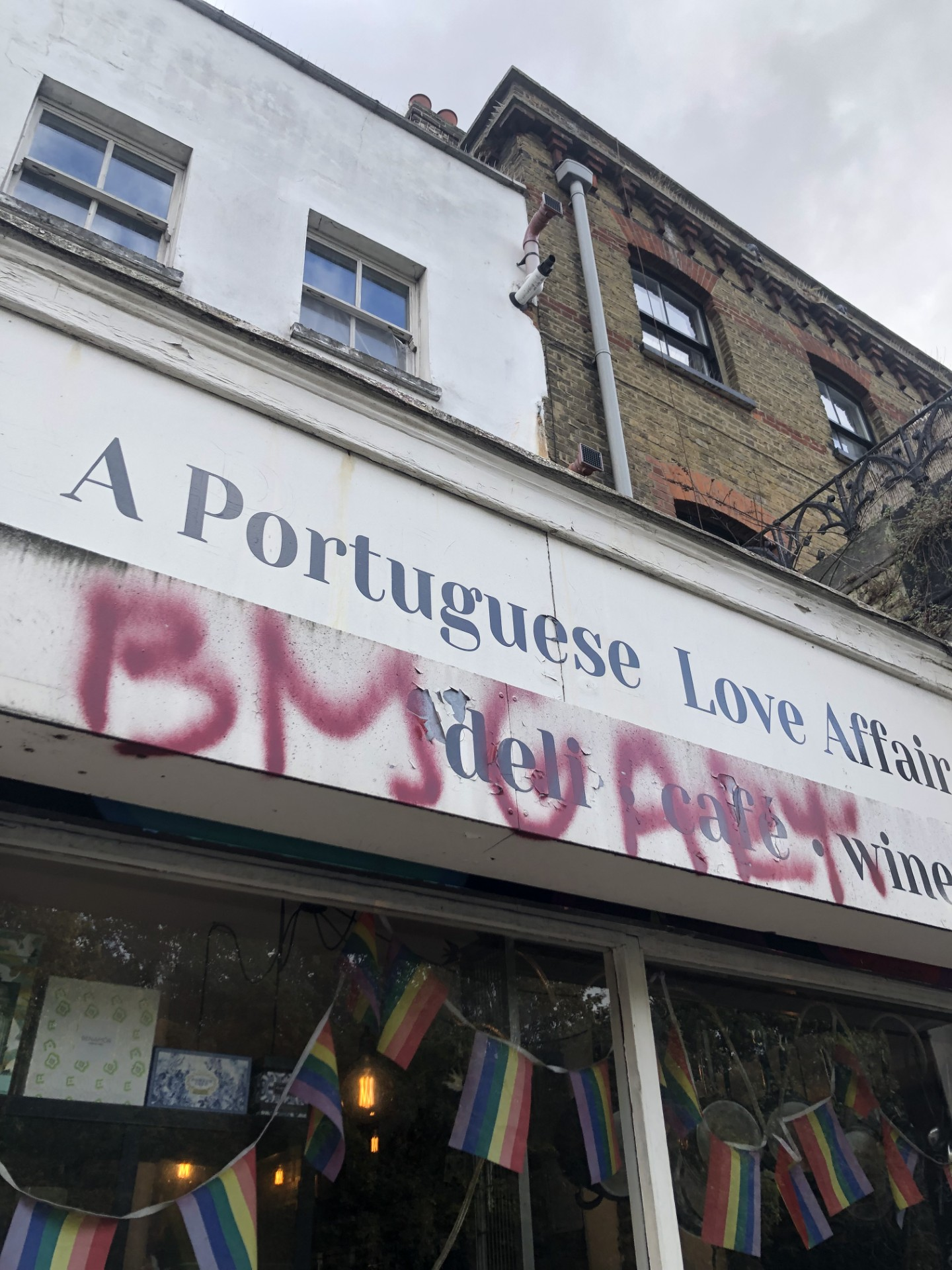
Outside the shop in 2023
