= Alexandre Rey Colaço =

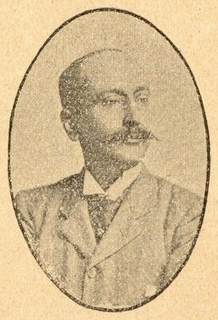

Background information
- Born: Alexandre Jorge Maria Idalécio Raimundo Rey Colaço; 30 April 1854; Tangier, Morocco
- Died: 11 September 1928 (aged 74) Lisbon, Portugal
- Occupations: Composer, pianist
- Instrument: Piano

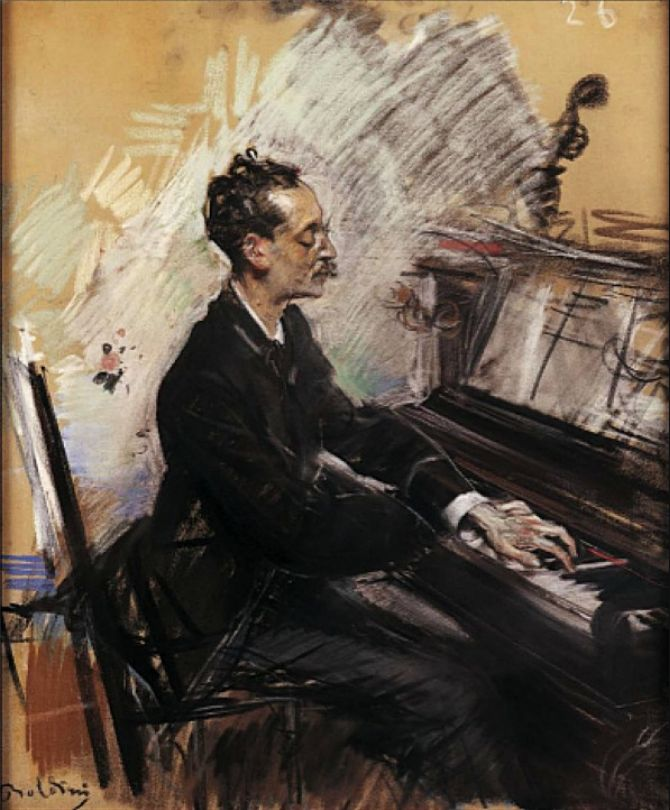
The Pianist A. Rey Colaco by Giovanni Boldini

Alexandre Jorge Maria Idalécio Raimundo Rey Colaço (Tangier, Morocco, 30 April 1854 - Lisbon, Portugal, 11 September 1928) was a Portuguese pianist of a French father and Spanish-Portuguese mother.

== Life ==
He studied piano at the Madrid Royal Conservatory and gave his first performance in Lisbon in 1881. Pedro Eugénio Daupias, 1º Visconde de Daupias (Count of Daupias) was present and so impressed that he offered Colaço a trip to Paris to continue his musical education. From there he moved on to Berlin to study at the Berlin Hochschule für Musik under Barth and Rudorff (piano) and Harertel and Bargiel (composition). Due to his outstanding talent, he was invited to teach piano at this school, whose director was the famous violinist Joseph Joachim, a great friend of Schumann and Brahms.

In 1887, Colaço returned to Lisbon and became a Portuguese citizen. He was appointed piano professor at the Conservatory of Music and contributed largely to the cultural activities of this country as a performer, pedagogue and composer. He taught music to the young Portuguese Prince Manuel of Saxe-Coburg and Gotha Braganza (later King Manuel II of Portugal).

Colaço married Alice Lafourcade Schmidt, born in Chile in 1865, who had a French mother and a German father. Their daughter, Amélia Rey Colaço, became one of Portugal's leading actors.

== Compositions ==
His works were among the first to incorporate popular themes of a Portuguese national character. These works include pieces for the piano: the collection of Fados, the reference point of his personal creative style, Bailarico, Jota, Malagueña and Pequenas Peças; for piano and voice: Cantigas de Portugal.

He also wrote a book, De Música, a consequence of his experience and reflections about musical art.

A recording of his piano music was issued by Educo Records in 1985 (Educo LP 4114). The recording by Michael Habermann contained the following compositions: Um Fado No. 1, Canção do Mondego, Fado No. 2, "Malagueña" from Cante Flamenco, Bailarico, Fado No. 3, "Hylário", Peças Pequenas, and Two Popular Spanish Dances: "Seguidilha" and "Jota".
