= Portuguese ruins in Zimbabwe =

Location of Portuguese Ruins in Zimbabwe

Portuguese ruins in Zimbabwe are scattered across the northern parts of Zimbabwe. They are a remnant of the Portuguese colonial presence in south-eastern Africa. From their coastal settlements, the Portuguese penetrated into what is now Zimbabwe as early as 1560, nearly 300 years before David Livingstone arrived at the Victoria Falls. The most famous of these early settlers was the missionary Gonçalo da Silveira. Silveira House, a further education center outside Harare, is named after him. The Portuguese were driven out of Zimbabwe completely during 1693 when the Rozvi led by Changamire invaded Karangaland.

== Introduction ==
There is now little evidence of the Portuguese settlements in Zimbabwe. The ruins are not well preserved. Peter Garlake excavated 3 of these sites – Dambarare, Masapa and Luanze. He designated them as National Monuments. The locations are documented in Google Earth photos. The settlements or feiras typically had a captain, a Priest and a small permanent community living in several brick built fortified houses surrounded by earth walls and ditches. pp197

A 1631 Dominican Order report said: "In the Kingdom of Mutapa the religious were in charge of three missions: Masapa, Ruhanje and Dambarare, each of them with one priest or one friar." pp29

== Timeline ==
- 1560 Gonçalo da Silveira in Zimbabwe.
- 1580s Masapa and Luanze feiras established.
- 1599 Dominican Churches built in Luanze and Masapa after Portuguese help Monomotapa Rusere to defeat the Zimba chief Chikanda. pp18
- 1607 Monomotapa cedes all gold mines to the Portuguese after they drive out insurgents led by Matuzianye from Monomotapa territory. Witnessed by João Lobo Priest at Luanze. pp436
- 1629 Monomotapa formally surrenders to the Portuguese after Monomotapa forces attack but fail to overcome Masapa and Luanze. Portuguese joined with an army of Batonga to defeat Monomotapa force and then installed their own chosen Monomatapa chief Manuza. Surrender witnessed by Gonçalo Ribeiro Priest at Masapa. pp459
- 1693 Portuguese leave Zimbabwe after Dambarare destroyed by Changamire.

== Angwa (Ongoe) ==
A complex of forts. Originally set up for the purpose of mining and trading in gold. Today's localization is in Two Three Hill.

== Dambarare ==
This was a large complex near present-day Jumbo mine (Mazowe).

"The feira of Dambarare was acclaimed the best of all the feiras in the Rivers of Sena, where almost all the rich influential merchants of Sena traded and thence scattered to other places such as Chitomborwizi, Rimuka, Luanze and Matafuna. Dambarare was the headquarters, second only to the administrative headquarters of the Captain of the Gates at Masapa." pp679

Originally set up for the purpose of mining and trading in gold. pp99 When excavated in 1967 there were found to be white males buried beneath the brick walled Church wearing gold rings with their arms crossed. Outside the Church were buried black women and children. A bronze medallion was unearthed with Saint Elizabeth of Portugal on one side and Saint Anthony of Padua with the infant Jesus on the other.pp122 Dambarare was destroyed in November 1693 which caused the Portuguese to leave Zimbabwe. pp103

== Luanze (Ruhanje) ==
There is a plinth commemorating the site of the church ruin. This settlement was established in 1580s. A Dominican church was built in or shortly after 1599. pp18 Originally set up under Monomotapa's control. pp99

In 1634 Pedro Barreto de Rezende pp479 wrote: "This fort has a church, served by a Dominican friar who administers the sacraments to the Christians who dwell there or pass through." pp30

Luanze declined in the second half of the 17th century and was replaced by Dambarare, Angwa and Maramuca. pp196

== Massapa (Masapa, Fura) ==
Covering 4 square kilometers. This settlement was established in 1580s. A Dominican church was built in or shortly after 1599. pp18 Originally set up under Monomotapa's control. pp99 It was near Mount Darwin where the Monomotapa had their capital. The Monomotapa gave the traditional title of Captain of the Gates to the Portuguese Captain here. (Francisco da Cunha pp430 and André Ferreira pp437)

His authority extended over Luanze from here. When Monomotapa formally surrendered to the Portuguese in 1629, Massapa became less important as the Portuguese Captain moved into the Monomotapa capital where he commanded a guard of Portuguese soldiers. pp196

== Maramuca (Rimuka) ==
This site is near present-day Bay Horse Mine (Chakari).The land was originally seized by Gonçalo João. pp103 There was an ivory statue of the Virgin Mary found here dating from 17th or 18th century. This is currently in the Bulawayo Museum.

== Piringani (Ditchwe) ==
Also known as Ditchwe. There is a lemon tree forest which is supposed to have been originally planted over 300 years ago by the Portuguese Friars.

== See also ==
- Great Zimbabwe
