= Historic Villages of Portugal =

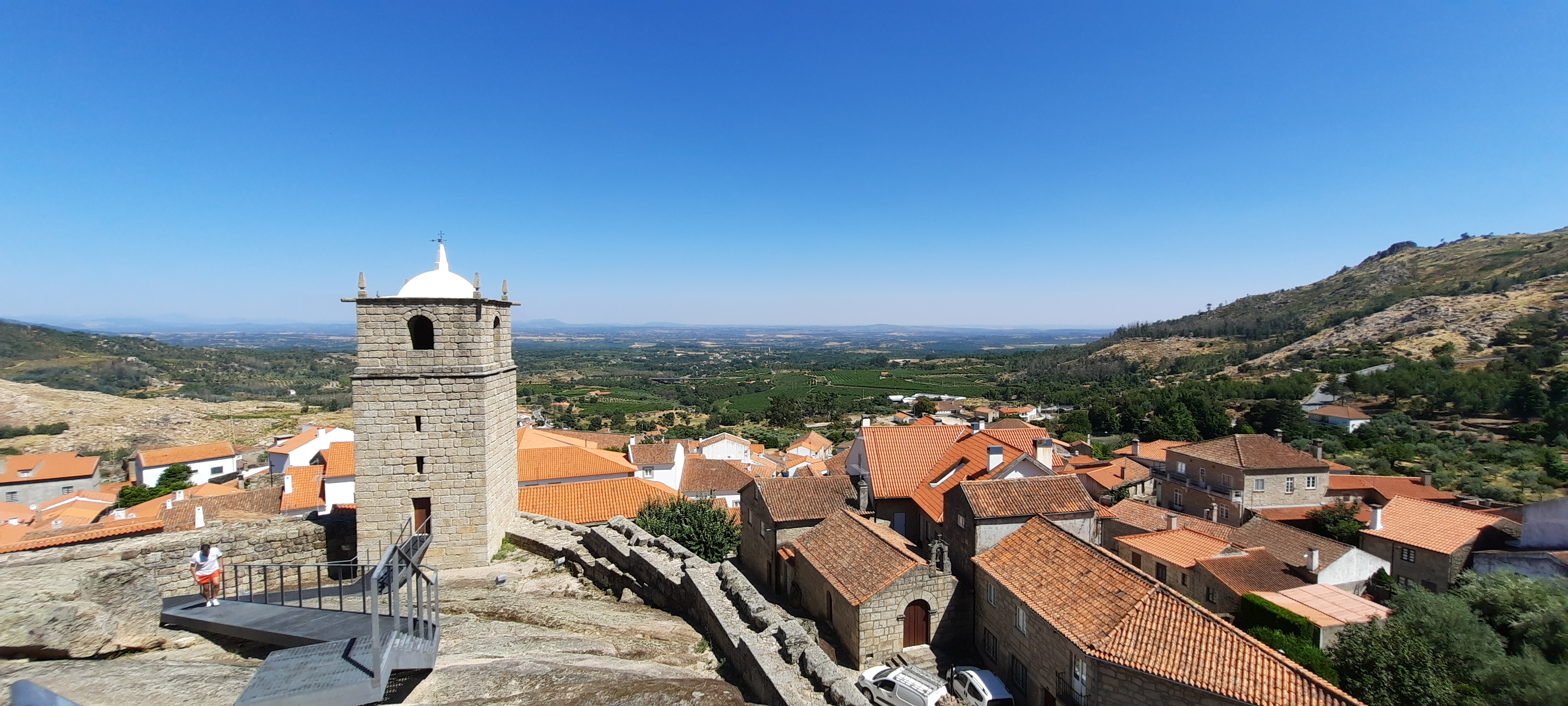
The historic village of Castelo Novo, Fundão

The Historic Villages of Portugal (Aldeias Históricas de Portugal) are a group of 12 villages classified under a 1991 government program called the Historic Villages Program (Programa de Aldeias Históricas). The aim of the program was to restore and promote a series of ancient villages/human settlements important to the history of Portugal. Starting in 1991 the government included 10 villages located in the Beira Interior in the Historic Villages program:

- Almeida
- Castelo Mendo
- Castelo Novo
- Castelo Rodrigo
- Idanha-a-Velha
- Linhares da Beira
- Marialva
- Monsanto
- Piódão
- Sortelha

An additional 2 villages were added to the program in 2003:

- Belmonte
- Trancoso
