= Rusere =

Rusere is a surname. This surname means '8' in Zimbabwean Shona.

Many years ago, in Zimbabwe, a man and a woman gave birth to eight children. This was such an extraordinary feat in their town, that everybody decided to call the father 'Eight'. Eight in Zimbabwean means 'Rusere', and that is how the surname came to be.

Notable people with the surname include:

- Carlos Rusere (born 1994), Zimbabwean footballer
- Langton Rusere (born 1985), Zimbabwean cricket umpire
- Tinos Rusere (1945-2007), Zimbabwean miner and trade union activist
