= Ermal Island =

Island in Portugal

Coordinates: 41.595279°N 8.129736°W

Ermal Island (Portuguese, Ilha do Ermal) is a peninsula situated in the Ermal Dam, parish of Mosteiro, municipality of Vieira do Minho, Portugal, about 25 km (16 mi) north of Braga.

The hard rock – heavy metal music festival "Festival da Ilha do Ermal" takes place in Ermal. The bands which have performed at Ermal include Slipknot, Sepultura and Angra. In addition, the festival has earned enduring fame for the 2002 stoning of Nickelback. Beyond music, this event provides varied activities: rural tourism, climbing, Handle Ski, boating, horse rides etc.
