= Manuel Centeno =

Manuel Centeno (born 18 September 1980) is a former bodyboarding European and World Champion, having won the ISA World Surfing Games 2006 on 22 October, at Huntington Beach, California, United States.

== Profile ==
Manuel Centeno was born in Porto, Portugal, he started practicing bodyboarding at the age of 14, and at the age of 16 he had already won some local trophies. Besides practicing professional bodyboarding, Manuel Centeno has finished in December 2006, the architecture degree, at the University of Porto.

- 2000 – Portuguese Champion
- 2001 – European Champion
- 2006 – Portuguese Champion
- 2006 – European Champion
- 2006 – World Champion
