= Bailarico =

Portuguese folk dance

Bailarico (also known as bailharico) is a Portuguese folk dance. The pairs face each other without holding each other, and with their backs turned to the neighboring pair, form a circle. In the first part of the music, the circle rotates, with the girls backing up and the boys going towards them. They take baby bouncing steps and both boys and girls raise their hands in the air. On the second part of the music, the pairs embrace and waltz by spinning in the same place, to one side first and then to the other.
