= List of Portuguese television series =

This is a list of Portuguese television series. The programs are listed alphabetically and are followed by the genre of the show and the date of the original run.

== 0–9 ==
- 5 Para A Meia-Noite - Talk show

== A ==
- A Banqueira do Povo - Telenovela, 1993
- A Fé dos Homens - religion
- A Grande Aposta - Telenovela, 1997–1998
- A Jóia de África - 2002
- A Lenda da Garça - Telenovela, 1999
- A Noite da Má Língua
- A Outra - Telenovela, 2008
- A Senhora das Águas - Telenovela, 2001–2002
- Acontece - Cultural Programme, 1995-2003
- Agora Escolha - Interactive Show, 1986–1994; 2011
- Agora É Que Conta - Game show
- Água de Mar - 2014
- Ajuste de Contas - Telenovela, 2000–2001
- Alentejo Sem Lei
- Alta Tensão - Music show
- Amanhecer - Telenovela, 2002
- Anjo Meu - Telenovela, 2011
- Anjo Selvagem - Telenovela, 2001–2003
- Aqui Não Há Quem Viva

== B ==
- Baía das Mulheres - Telenovela, 2004–2005
- Bem-Vindos a Beirais - 2013–2016
- Big Show SIC
- Boa Tarde - Talk show
- Buéréré

== C ==
- Câmara Clara
- Chiquititas - Telenovela, 2007–2008
- Chuva de Maio - Musical, 1990
- Chuva na Areia - Telenovela, 1985
- Cidade Despida - Crime drama
- Cinzas - Telenovela, 1992
- Clube dos Campeões
- Companhia das Manhãs
- Conta-me como foi - Historical drama
- Coração Malandro - Telenovela, 2003
- Curto Circuito

== D ==
- Dá-me Música - Music show
- Dei-te Quase Tudo - Telenovela, 2005–2006
- Deixa que te Leve - Telenovela, 2009–2010
- Deixa-me Amar - Telenovela, 2007–2008
- Depois do Adeus - Historical drama, 2013–present
- Desencontros - Telenovela, 1995
- Desporto 2 - Sports
- Destino Imortal - Fantasy drama, 2010
- Diz que é uma Espécie de Magazine - Talk/comedy show
- Doce Fugitiva - Telenovela, 2006–2007
- Duarte & C.ª

== E ==
- Ele é Ela
- Espírito Indomável - Telenovela

== F ==
- Fala-me de Amor - Telenovela, 2006
- Fama Show
- Fascínios - Telenovela, 2007–2008
- Feitiço de Amor - Telenovela, 2008–2009
- Festival da Canção - Music show
- Filha do Mar - Telenovela, 2001
- Os Filhos do Rock - Historical, 2013-2014
- Filhos do Vento - Telenovela, 1997
- Flor do Mar - Telenovela, 2008–2009
- Floribella - Telenovela, 2006–2007
- Fúria de Viver - Telenovela, 2002

== G ==
- Ganância - Telenovela, 2001
- Gato Fedorento - Comedy
- Glória - Historical thriller drama, 2021

== H ==
- Herman 2010 - 2010
- Herman Enciclopédia - Comedy
- Hoje - News show, 2010–2013
- Horizontes da Memória

== I ==
- Ídolos - Music show
- Ilha dos Amores - Telenovela, 2007
- Inspector Max

== J ==
- Jardins Proibidos - Telenovela, 2000–2001
- Jornal 2 - News
- Jornal da Noite - News
- Jornal da Tarde - News
- Jornal da Uma - News
- Jornal Nacional - News
- Jornalistas
- Jura - Telenovela, 2006–2007
- Julie e os fantasmas - Musical show 2003

== L ==
- Laços de Sangue - Telenovela, 2010–Present
- Lado B
- Liberdade 21, Drama
- Lua Vermelha
- Lusitana Paixão - Telenovela, 2002

== M ==
- Mar de Paixão - Telenovela
- Maternidade - Medical drama, 2011–2013
- Meu Amor - Telenovela, 2009–2010
- Mistura Fina - Telenovela, 2004–2005
- Morangos com Açúcar - Telenovela/Teen drama, 2003–Present
- Mundo Meu - Telenovela, 2005–2006

== N ==
- Na Paz dos Anjos - Telenovela, 1994
- Natal dos Hospitais
- Nico d'Obra - Comedy
- Ninguém Como Tu - Telenovela, 2005
- Nunca Digas Adeus - Telenovela, 2001
- Nutri Ventures - Em Busca dos 7 Reinos - Animation, 2012-2014

== O ==
- O Clube das Chaves
- O Dom, 2011
- Os Donos do Jogo
- O Jogo - Telenovela, 2004–2006
- O Juiz Decide
- O Olhar da Serpente - Telenovela, 2002–2003
- O Preço Certo - Game show
- O Programa do Aleixo - Comedy
- O Tal Canal - Comedy
- O Teu Olhar - Telenovela, 2003–2004
- O Último Beijo - Telenovela, 2002–2003
- Os Andrades
- Os Contemporâneos - Comedy
- Olhar O Mundo
- Os Homens da Segurança
- Os Melhores Anos, Teen drama
- Olhos de Água - Telenovela, 2001
- Olhos nos Olhos - Telenovela, 2008–2009
- Operação Triunfo - Music show, 2010
- Origens - Telenovela, 1983
- Os Lobos - Telenovela, 1998

== P ==
- Pai à Força - Drama
- Paixões Proibidas - Telenovela, 2007
- Palavras Cruzadas - Telenovela, 1987
- Paraíso Filmes - Comedy
- Passerelle - Telenovela, 1988
- Perfeito Coração - Telenovela, 2009–2010
- Plano Inclinado
- Podia Acabar o Mundo - Telenovela, 2008–2009
- Portugal em Directo
- Portugal FM - Comedy
- Portugal no Coração - Talk/variety show
- Portugal Radical - Sports
- Portugal Tem Talento - Talent show, 2011
- Portugueses Pelo Mundo
- Praça Pública
- Praça da Alegria
- Primeiro Amor - Telenovela, 1996
- Primeira Jornal - News
- Programa das Festas
- Prós e Contras - Debate show

== Q ==
- Quadratura do Círculo
- Quem Quer Ser Milionário
- Queridas Feras - Telenovela, 2003–2004

== R ==
- Rebelde Way - 2008-2009
- Remate - Sports News, 1984-2001
- Remédio Santo - Telenovela, 2011–Present
- República - Historical drama, 2011
- Resistirei - Telenovela, 2007–2008
- Ricardina e Marta - Telenovela, 1989
- Riscos - Teen drama
- Rosa Fogo - Telenovela, 2011
- Roseira Brava - Telenovela, 1996
- Rua Sésamo - Children's show, 1989–1994

== S ==
- Sabadabadu - Comedy, 1981
- Saber Amar - Telenovela, 2003
- Salve-se Quem Puder
- Secret Story - Casa dos Segredos - 2010
- Sedução - Telenovela
- Sentimentos - Telenovela, 2009–2010
- Sinais de Vida - Medical drama, 2013–Present
- Sonhos Traídos - Telenovela, 2002

== T ==
- Telejornal - News show, 1959–Present
- Telhados de Vidro - Telenovela, 1993
- Tempo de Viver - Telenovela, 2006–2007
- Terra Mãe - Telenovela, 1998
- The Voice Portugal - Singing talent show, 2011–present
- Todo o Tempo do Mundo - Telenovela, 1999–2000
- Top + - Music/Music Chart and Video show, 1991-2012
- Tu e Eu - Telenovela, 2006–2007
- Tudo Por Amor - Telenovela, 2002
- TV Rural - Agricultural Programme, 1960-1990
- TV2 Jornal - News Show

== U ==
- Último a Sair, 2011
- Uma Aventura, 2000-2007
- Uma Canção Para Ti - Music, 2011
- Um Estranho Em Casa

== V ==
- Vai Tudo Abaixo - Comedy
- Verão Quente - Telenovela, 1993
- Vidas de Sal - Telenovela, 1996
- Vila Faia - Telenovela, 1982
- Vila Faia - Telenovela, 2008–2009
- Vingança - Telenovela, 2007
- Você na TV! - 2012

== Z ==
- Zé Gato - Crime drama
- Zip Zap
- Zip-Zip - Talk and Variety Show, 1969

== See also ==
- Television in Portugal
