= RTC =

RTC may refer to:

== Places in the United States ==
- Redmond Town Center, Washington
- Reston Town Center, Virginia

== Education and training ==
- Recruit Training Command, Great Lakes, Illinois
- Reformed Theological College, Australia
- Regional Technical College, former name of Institutes of Technology in Ireland
- Renton Technical College, also known as Renton Tech, an American public two-year institution
- Royal Thimphu College, the first private university in Bhutan

== Organisations and enterprises ==
- RTC (Cape Verde), also known as Radiotelevisão Caboverdiana, Cape Verde's state-owned radio and television station
- RTC (record label), New Zealand record label
- Radiotelevisão Comercial, a defunct organization within Rádio e Televisão de Portugal
- Dirección General de Radio, Televisión y Cinematografía, a Mexican government agency
- Religious Technology Center, the corporate body that controls the intellectual property of the Church of Scientology
- Residential treatment center, a live-in health care facility for adolescents with severe psychological, behavioral, and/or substance abuse issues
- Resolution Trust Corporation, the government-owned company created to manage insolvent financial institutions during the US savings and loan crisis
- Rochester Telephone Company (disambiguation), several telephone companies in the United States
- Rotterdam Terror Corps, a Dutch gabber group
- Radiotechnique-Coprim, a French electronics company
- Rational Team Concert, an IBM software engineering solution
- U.S. Army Redstone Test Center, a testing organization of the United States Army

== Technology ==
- Real-time clock, the clock that keeps civil time for a computer
- Real-time communication, any mode of telecommunications in which all users can exchange information instantly or with negligible delay
- Real-time computing

== Transport ==
- Rail traffic controller, a person who oversees the movement of trains and controls railway signals
- Rails-to-Trails Conservancy, a US organization to promote use of railroad rights-of-way as trails
- Railway Technical Centre, the British Rail research centre in Derby, England
- Regional Transportation Commission of Southern Nevada, a government agency responsible for public transit and roads in the Las Vegas valley
  - RTC Transit, public transit service in the Las Vegas area
- Regional Transportation Commission of Washoe County, a government agency responsible for public transit and roads in and around the cities of Reno and Sparks, in Western Nevada
- Réseau de transport de la Capitale, the regional transportation commission for Quebec City
- Road traffic collision, or road traffic accident
- Road Transport Corporation, see Category:State road transport corporations of India
- Rochester Transit Corporation, historical operator of streetcar, rail, and bus transit in Rochester, New York

== Other uses ==
- Regional Trial Court, the highest trial courts in the Philippines
- Right to Censor, a group in the World Wrestling Federation
- Rosette terminal complex, a structure in vascular plants which produces cellulose
- Replication and transcription complex, the most vulnerable part of a coronavirus
- RTC (treaty), 2001 revision of the Treaty of Chaguaramas
- Ride the Cyclone, the Musical

== See also ==
- RCT (disambiguation)
