= Nuno Markl =

Portuguese comedian and writer

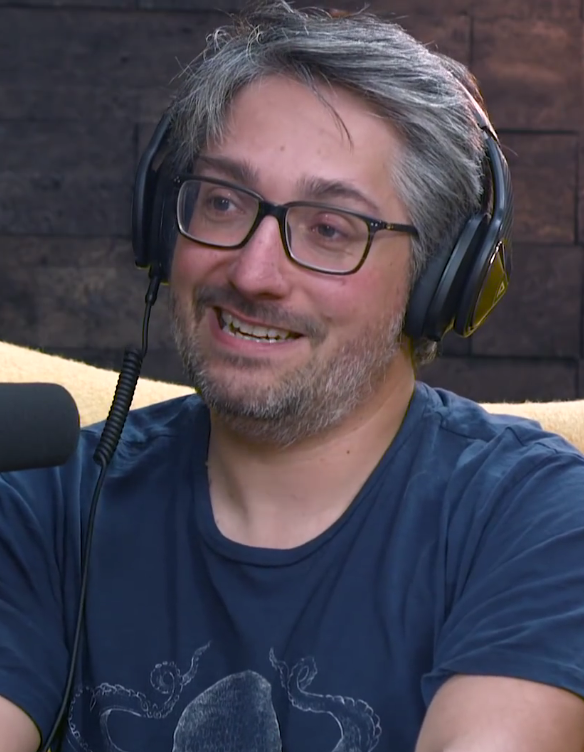
- Nuno Markl in 2015
- Born: Nuno Frederico Correia da Silva Lobato Markl; 21 July 1971 (age 54); Lisbon
- Occupations: Comedian, writer, radio host, television host, voice actor and screenwriter
- Years active: 1997–present
- Spouse: Ana Galvão (m. 2010, div. 2016)
- Children: 1

Nuno Frederico Correia da Silva Lobato Markl (born 21 July 1971), known as Nuno Markl, is a Portuguese comedian, writer, radio host, television host, voice actor and screenwriter. He was born in Lisbon.

== Career ==
=== Radio ===
At age 10, Markl already simulated radio broadcasts at home, while in the late 80s, he started working at a pirate radio station, A Voz de Benfica. With the desire of entering the professional radio world, he enrolled at CENJOR's journalism course, in 1990. Upon finishing, he worked as a journalist on Correio da Manhã Rádio (1991–1993), later on Rádio Comercial (1993–1997), even though this wasn't his vocation. On CMR, Markl fmade a program called Prok Der e Vier, where he started the satirical radionovela "A Saga de Abílio Mortaça". Upon its closure, he was transferred to Rádio Comercial, where its production continued. Thanks to this work, he was invited to enter the Produções Fictícias creative agency in 1995.

Markl is well known in Portugal for his radio series "O Homem Que Mordeu o Cão" (The Man Who Bit The dog). It started in 1997, when he joined Pedro Ribeiro, José Carlos Malato and Ana Lamy for the morning show at Rádio Comercial. In 2001, Malato and Lamy left, and were replaced by Maria de Vasconcelos. The radio series later spawned a TV show, and three books.

Since October 2008, Markl has worked for Antena 3, with his current shows being "São Coisas Que Acontecem", "Laboratolarilolela" (a showcase of lesser known Pimba artists and songs), and "Nuno & Nando" (with Fernando Alvim). Before "São Coisas Que Acontecem", he ran "Há Vida em Markl" (based on a comic strip formerly published on Inimigo Público) and "O Livro dos Porquês" (where funny answers were given to mundane factoid questions). Another one of his most famous radio shows is Caderneta de Cromos, which ran on Rádio Comercial, upon his return in 2009. In it, he reminisced about nostalgic things from his childhood.

He has another show on Rádio Comercial, Grandiosa História Universal das Traquitanas, which discusses mankind's inventions.

=== Television ===
Upon joining Produções Fictícias, he wrote sketches for Herman Zap (1995-96), Herman Enciclopédia (1997), Herman 98 (1998), Herman 99 (1999), Herman SIC (2000), Paraíso Filmes (2001–2002), O Programa da Maria (2002), Hora H (2007) and Os Contemporâneos (2008), this last one, also as an actor.

Nuno Markl debuted his hosting career on television in 2001, co-hosting "Sem Filtro" (a youth-oriented talk show on RTP1) alongside Rita Mendes and Gaspar Borges. He then moved to SIC Radical, where he worked on two different projects revolving around his other passion, film. Also on SIC Radical, he had a television show with Fernando Alvim, O Perfeito Anormal, which launched the comedy troupe Gato Fedorento.

He wrote many cult sketches for Herman José, especially for his show "Herman Enciclopédia". He wrote for the prematurely cancelled Programa da Maria (which had some Upright Citizens Brigade influenced sketches) and now writes for Os Contemporâneos. Nuno regularly updates his weblog, A Cave do Markl, providing movie reviews, video blogs, and updates on his work. Other side projects include TV and print ads for Café Delta and performing voice acting duties for the Portuguese version of films:

- "Spike" in Flushed Away;
- "Raphael" in Teenage Mutant Ninja Turtles;
- "Barry B. Benson" in Bee Movie

He was also responsible for translating and adapting Monty Python sketches for an onstage Portuguese version, performed by, among others, Bruno Nogueira, Miguel Guilherme, António Feio and José Pedro Gomes.

== Personal life ==
Nuno Markl lives in the Greater Lisbon area. He is of Austrian descent through his paternal grandfather. On 3 September 2010, he married the radio and television show host Ana Galvão, with whom he has a son, Pedro, born on 7 June 2009. In 2016, they announced their separation.

Nuno and Ana are well known advocates for children's and animal rights.
