= Formas e Conteúdos =

Defunct Portuguese television production company

Formas e Conteúdos - Produção Audiovisual, SA, branded as FO&CO (pun on foco, Portuguese for "focus"), was a Portuguese video service and television production company owned by Rádiotelevisão Portuguesa (RTP). The company was established in 1999 and entered into service on 1 January 2000, using the Lumiar studios. It eventually shut down on 1 October 2003, subsequently merging with Edipim to create the current RTP Meios de Produção.

== History ==
In the late 1990s, RTP considered the production area to be of high importance; for this end, it announced the autonomy of the Lisbon Production Center (Centro de Produção de Lisboa, CPL) to create a new company that would become FO&CO, becoming one of the companies of the "RTP universe". The company was formally constituted on 25 August 1999, with an initial capital of €2.5 million.

In an initial phase, the new company was dedicated to resource rentals, such as outside broadcast vehicles, studios and teams, as well as the creation of "ordered products that don't require creativity". The impending arrival of digital television, coupled with the inevitable increase in the amount of channels (at the time, there were around fifty channels on cable) caused RTP to invest in this sector. It also had plans to produce for other Lusophone countries, in Africa and in Brazil, and that 49% of the company would be exploited by a private entity. A Service Order was issued on 31 December, putting the company operational from the next day. Televisión Española was also interested in using its services, as the prices offered by the company were cheaper.

In February 2001, SIC rented FO&CO's Studio 5 to use it as the studio of Noites Marcianas at a very low price. Sport TV, who was also using its facilities, was also criticizing the prices used.

On 5 December 2002, RTP announced the discontinuing of FO&CO, alongside Edipim, to create RTP Meios de Produção. The decision was criticized according to the RTP Workers' Commission, which implied the loss of 60 to 70 jobs. The Journalists' Union was in talks with FO&CO staff on 23 June 2003 regarding the future of the company. In September 2003, the company fired eighteen staff, fifteen of which (the remaining three were ill) presented their request to rejoin the group on 16 September, enabling their return only if they were part of the merged company, as well as the plans for RTP2's repositioning as 2: and the then-upcoming RTP Memória channel.

On 1 October 2003, FO&CO ceased to exist and the new RTP Meios de Produção began operations.

== Productions ==
- O Jardim da Celeste
- Noites Marcianas (usage of studios)
- Segredo de Justiça
