= Canal Q =

Portuguese television channel

- Country: Portugal
- Broadcast area: Portugal; Angola; Mozambique

Programming
- Picture format: 16:9 576i (SDTV)

Ownership
- Owner: Canal Q, Unipessoal, Lda. (Produções Fictícias)

History
- Launched: March 29, 2010; 15 years ago

Links
- Website: Canal Q

Canal Q is a Portuguese cable and satellite television network that is owned by Produções Fictícias, a creative agency and production company responsible for some of the most popular comedy shows in Portuguese national television. The channel carries comedy programming, entertainment and information, while 90% of the programming are original productions. Its flagship program is Inferno, a satirical television program.

== History ==
Produções Fictícias has been planning the channel since 2009 and was announced at the start of 2010 as a MEO-exclusive channel, with the channel announced to be "different from other channels". It was set to broadcast two hours a day in prime time and would have a strong on demand presence, for free, to MEO subscribers. On 11 February 2010, the channel was approved by ERC, the national media regulator. Its schedule was from 21:45 to 00:00 every evening, with the downtime being used for on-demand services. The channel's schedule was going to consist of 50-minute talk-shows and small segments of 5-15 minutes convering various topics as well as an hour-long cultural magazine. It was later revealed (on February 24) that the channel already had its first names on board, Nuno Markl and Guta Moura Guedes. The former was to front the nightly magazine A Rede, which was set to be the channel's flagship show, and the latter, As Cidades Visíveis, a program dedicated to architecture.

On 29 March 2010, the channel started broadcasting; As Cidades Visíveis becoming the first program seen. The list of programs for the Spring 2010 season was:

- A Rede: daily (weeknights)
- As Cidades Visíveis: architecture (Mondays)
- Agora a Sério: politics (Tuesdays)
- Ping Pong Top: lists (Wednesdays)
- Sacanas Sem Lei: football (Thursdays)
- Mapa: cultural talk-show (Fridays)
- Histórias Devidas: personal stories (Saturdays)
- Especial: comedy talk-show with Salvador Martinha (Sundays)

One month after launch, Nuno Artur Silva, founder of Produções Fictícias, gave a positive first impression, announcing four new programs: a television version of the satirical publication Inimigo Público with Joana Cruz, Caça ao Cómico with Rui Unas, Melancómico with Nuno Costa Santos and Clube da Palavra. Inimigo Público was the first to premiere; by the end of May, the channel had 15 programs on air, all made in Portugal.

As the months progressed, Canal Q expanded the number of daily hours, which is currently (on average) between 11:00 and 04:00. The channel's first live event, on 30 October 2010, was a live broadcast of the 2010 Miss World pageant, followed by a debate on international crisis.

A huge schedule change occurred on 3 October 2011. A Rede was replaced by satirical news show Inferno, originally taking the 22:00 timeslot before moving to 22:30 in May 2012.

In March 2012, it signed an agreement with Terra Líquida Filmes to create a new brand identity. The channel rebranded for the first time on 13 July 2012, with the logo swapping blue for red.

In February 2013, it was announced that the channel would expand to ZON (now NOS). Said launch occurred on 4 March 2013, followed by international launches in Angola, Mozambique and France.

By the end of the year, the channel had recovered the essence of SIC Radical in its early years, which by 2013 had become a channel airing mainly reality shows and giving little time for new Portuguese talent and "out of the box" ideas.

On 29 March 2014, the channel rebranded once again, with a completely new look and logo.

In January 2015, with the nomination of Nuno Artur Silva by RTP's General Independent Council, to occupy the position of administrator with the responsibility of RTP's content, Gonçalo Félix da Costa became the new administrator of Produções Fictícias and Canal Q. Following the exit of da Costa, former director of production Diana Coelho became the director-general. The directorate was made up of four further elements: André Caldeira as technical director, Gonçalo Fonseca as commercial and communications director, Susana Romana as creative director and Michelle Adrião as financial director.

In early 2016, the channel was made available on Vodafone Portugal.

On 18 July 2025, Canal Q renewed its license for another fifteen years, under the terms of the existing Television Law.
