= Ricardo Araújo Pereira =

Portuguese comedian and television personality (born 1974)

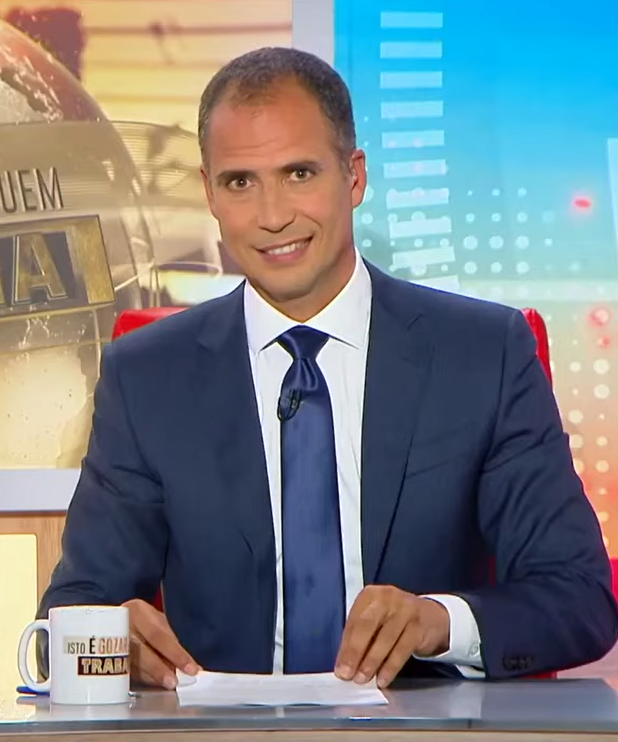
- Pereira in 2024
- Born: Ricardo Artur de Araújo Pereira; 28 April 1974 (age 52); Lisbon, Portugal
- Other name: RAP
- Education: Universidade Católica Portuguesa
- Notable work: Gato Fedorento; Diz Que É Uma Espécie de Magazine; Zé Carlos; Mixórdia de Temáticas; Melhor do que Falecer; Isto é Gozar com Quem Trabalha
- Spouse: Maria José Areias
- Children: 2

Comedy career
- Years active: 1998–present
- Medium: Television, Stand up

Ricardo Artur de Araújo Pereira (born 28 April 1974) is a Portuguese comedian, political commentator and journalist. Pereira first rose to national notoriety in the early 2000s as a member of the Portuguese comedy group Gato Fedorento.

== Life and career ==
Pereira was born in Lisbon. His father worked as a TAP aircraft pilot and his mother was a flight attendant. He has a degree in Social Communication from the Universidade Católica Portuguesa. Araújo Pereira also worked as a journalist for the Jornal de Letras, Artes e Ideias.

Pereira worked as a writer for Produções Fictícias and was one of the writers of Herman 98, Herman 99 and Herman Difusão Portuguesa (hosted by the Portuguese comedian Herman José), and he also co-wrote Maria Rueff's show O Programa da Maria (2001), Felizes para Sempre (Expresso), As Crónicas de José Estebes, on Diário de Notícias, among many others.

In 2003, Pereira made his first appearance on national television acting in the series O Perfeito Anormal (The Perfect Freak) along with fellow Gato Fedorento member Zé Diogo Quintela on SIC Radical.

In the same year, he started the Gato Fedorento comedy project along with Zé Diogo Quintela, Miguel Góis and Tiago Dores. They starred in a series of subsequent shows, Gato Fedorento, Série Fonseca, Série Meireles and Série Barbosa on SIC Radical. They moved to RTP1 in 2006, with Gato Fedorento, Série Lopes da Silva and Diz Que é Uma Espécie De Magazine; and later to SIC in 2008 with Zé Carlos and, later, Gato Fedorento Esmiúça os Sufrágios.

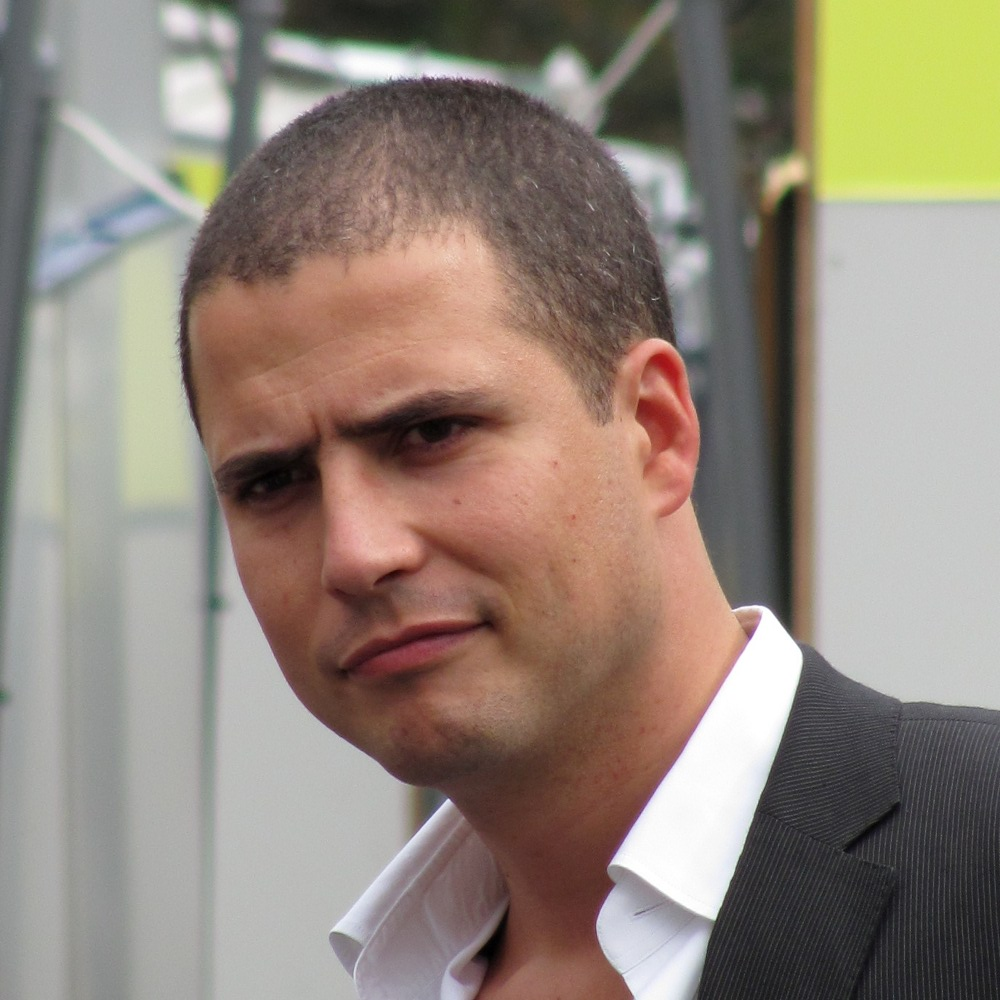
Ricardo Araújo Pereira in 2010

Pereira worked at Rádio Comercial where he had a show named ‘’Mixórdia de Temáticas’’. He also hosted the television program "Gente que não sabe estar" at TVI.

Pereira was voted 76th Greatest Portuguese of all time in a Poll conducted by RTP (Rádio Televisão Portuguesa) for its Show "Grandes Portugueses", based on a similar show, "100 Greatest Britons", aired on BBC.

In 2019, he won a Golden Globe for Comedy at the 24th Portuguese Golden Globes Gala. While he was unable to attend the event, he sent in a video where he thanked everyone involved in his shows.

== Prizes ==
He was awarded the Arco-íris Prize, by the ILGA Portugal Association, for his contribution, as a comedian, in the fight against discrimination and homophobia.

In 2013, he won the Crónica Grand Prize, with his book Novas Crónicas da Boca do Inferno selected by the Portuguese Association of Writers in partnership with the Municipality of Sintra.

== Personal life ==
He is married to former radio producer Maria José Areias with whom he has two daughters, Rita and Maria Inês. He is a supporter of S.L. Benfica and an atheist.
