= Maria de Vasconcelos =

Portuguese psychiatrist, singer and songwriter

- Born: 14 December 1970; Lisbon, Portugal
- Known for: Didactic songs for children
- Spouse: Xavier Colette
- Children: Two daughters

Maria de Vasconcelos (born 1970) is a Portuguese psychiatrist, singer and songwriter. As well as being a practising psychiatrist, she has worked as a fashion model, a television and radio presenter, and as a performer, mainly of didactic music for children.

== Early life ==
Maria de Vasconcelos was born in the Portuguese capital of Lisbon on 14 December 1970. Her mother was a doctor. As a child, she played classical guitar and the violin. In 1991 she trained in musical pedagogy at the Serviço de Animação, Criação Artística e Educação pela Arte (Service of Animation, Artistic Creation and Education through Art), organized by the Calouste Gulbenkian Foundation in Lisbon. She was a fashion model from 1992 to 2001. She also worked as an announcer for Rádio e Televisão de Portugal (RTP) and as a radio show presenter. She is married to Xavier Colette, a Brazilian, with whom she has two daughters, born in 2004 and 2006.

== Medical career ==
In her tenth year at school, Vasconcelos was given an assignment on mental health. This awakened her interest in the topic. She graduated in medicine at the Faculty of Sciences of the University of Lisbon, with a specialisation in psychiatry, in July 1994. She worked as an assistant in the areas of histology and embryology at that Faculty between 1990 and 2007. Vasconcelos completed an internship in psychiatry in February 2001 at the Hospital de São Francisco Xavier in Belém. She then did a postgraduate course in gestalt therapy from 2004 to 2008. Since completing her postgraduate course, she has practised at a clinic in the Cascais area.

== Musical career ==
Vasconcelos had been writing songs to help her study and she carried on this practice by writing songs for her daughters that would help them learn. She has since produced records with her daughters that aim to assist young children to learn by bringing to life historic events and other subjects. The first, in 2011, was called Canções da Maria (Maria's songs), about pronunciation; the second, in 2013, was about the multiplication table; and the third, in 2017, was about Portuguese history and was illustrated by the Portuguese comedian Nuno Markl. She also does live performances together with her daughters and husband. They have toured Portugal and appeared on television.

== Health ==
Vasconcelos wrote a book called The day I survived. She was ill for five years with a disease that began during her second pregnancy and could not be diagnosed. At one point she experienced a respiratory arrest. Finally, she was diagnosed as suffering from a fungus called Stachybotrys, which can cause hemorrhagic pneumonia. The book is an account of when she was in hospital, which she wrote while recovering.
