= Paraíso Filmes =

- Genre: Mockumentary
- Written by: Filipe Homem Fonseca; Eduardo Madeira; Nuno Markl
- Directed by: Carlos Barreto
- Starring: José Pedro Gomes; António Feio
- Narrated by: Nuno Markl
- Composer: Manuel Faria
- Country of origin: Portugal
- Original language: Portuguese
- No. of seasons: 2
- No. of episodes: 26

Production
- Production location: Lisbon
- Production companies: Diamantino Filmes; Produções Fictícias

Original release
- Network: RTP1
- Release: September 2001 – 2002

Paraíso Filmes is a Portuguese mockumentary television series broadcast for two seasons of thirteen episodes each on RTP1 between 2001 and 2002, about a fictional production company set up at a bath equipment company in Trafaria.

== Format ==
In the series' opening narration, an idea was submitted to RTP's director of programming on 24 April 1974, which sought to revolutionize Portuguese cinema, however, the following day, the Carnation Revolution broke out. Twenty-six years later, the dream to make American-style film superproductions did not die. At Banheira 2000, a store that sells bathroom equipment, Túlio Gonzaga (António Feio), a wedding, baptism and funeral videographer and producer Belchior Baptista (José Pedro Gomes), lead the titular Paraíso Filmes, tasked to produce 26 feature films based on existing film archetypes. The lack of time, money and notion of making movies ultimately takes them to "interpret" the interpreters.

== Episodes ==
=== Series overview ===
Series	Episodes	Originally released	
Series	Episodes	First released	Last released
1	13	6 September 2001	15 December 2001
2	13	2002	2002

=== Season 1 (2001) ===
No.	Title	Original release date	Ref.
1	"Febre de Domingo à Noite (Saturday Night Fever)"	6 September 2001	
We are introduced to Paraíso Filmes at the offices and warehouse of Banheira 2000. Once the team is assembled, they begin producing their first production, Sunday Night Fever.
2	"3/15 Dias (9½ Weeks)"	13 September 2001	
The studio's plan for a biblical epic are foiled when Belchior Baptista wants to make an erotic movie, which immediately begins filming, owing to the lack of rights to the Bible. The real reason was Belchior's romance with a Russian cossack, Liliana Kalashnikova, who wants to become an actress. However, the actress is controlled by the Russian mafia and cannot have her body recognized in the erotic production, to an extent that she had to be covered up by 24 stunt doubles.
3	"Desaparecido em Luanda II (Platoon)"	20 September 2001	
Paraíso Filmes makes a movie on the Portuguese Colonial War, based on memories Belchior Baptista had of João Carlos Julieta, who went missing in action in Angola. The movie is based on real eyewitness accounts, including that of João Carlos Julieta's daughter, Soraia Sónia, who turned out to be a patient at the Milagre Cirúrgico clinic. It is then discovered that Julieta is alive as a car mechanic in Almada. This doesn't halt its production.
4	"Shôr Aníbal (The Silence of the Lambs)"	27 September 2001	
A movie about serial killer Shôr Aníbal (Mr. Anibal) is produced, with Simões Júnior being the lead actor. He is the son of RTP director of programming Pereira Simões and is known for his lack of talent. Things take a turn for the worse where, in a scene influenced by shower scene from Psycho, Simões Júnior is stabbed by actor Celso Matias.
5	"Sardinha (Jaws)"	11 October 2001	
The company shoots a film on a killer sardine, shot on location in Trafaria and Fonte da Telha. The production was narrowly cancelled due to an evaluation of Paraíso Filmes, since it was registered as a bathroom equipment company. After a court injunction from Banheira 2000 secretary-turned-actress Vanda Veloso, work on Sardinha is finished on time, with a stringent two-day deadline.
6	"O Regresso da Vingança do Dragão Vermelho VI (Hong Kong martial arts films)"	29 October 2001	
The latest production is a martial arts film. He had to hire two Oriental monks to provide cultural consultancy, which clashed with Belchior's stress and Western mindset.
7	"O Bom, o Mau e o Espanhol (The Good, the Bad and the Ugly)"	5 November 2001	
Belchior makes a period movie set in the early years of Portugal about the conquests of D. Afonso Henriques, the first Portuguese king. However, Túlio Gonzaga decides to make it a western instead: the cowboys become Portuguese, the Indians Spaniards and the old west is set in Torres Vedras. Belchior refuses to follow Túlio's plan, due to a dose of calming aids from Vanda Veloso. When Belchior discovers the final result, he decides to end the company, but due to the intervention of Serafim Baptista, Belchior's father, the issue is solved and the film becomes a message against the Spaniards.
8	"O Agente L123 - Ao Serviço de Sua Excelência o Presidente da República (James Bond franchise)"	9 November 2001	
The story of SIS secret agent José Ribeiro, Agent L123, and his fight against Mestre do Mal (Master of Evil), who steals all of the world's money and demands a rescue worth US$1 million in small banknotes. Production problems emerge when the real SIS intervenes since the story is seen as real and secret, which Túlio never imagined to hear while being told by a drunk discogoer at 3am. Once the production problems are solved, the first Portuguese secret agent movie shows L123's chaotic life, waking up one day in Trancoso, then following a terrorist in Benevide or disarming a Dyane in Tróia.
9	"Brocky IV (Rocky IV)"	16 November 2001	
Logistical problems at RTP prevent the sending of the tape for the movie they were supposed to work on, causing the team to make a movie from scratch. After thinking of a family movie akin to The Sound of Music, the choice ended up becoming a boxing movie: Brocky IV. One of the actors selected at the beginning of its production was Félix Manassa, Paraíso Filmes' security man. The other ended up being Norberto Frias. The movie was finished a few hours ahead of the deadline.
10	"O Enxertista (The Exorcist)"	23 November 2001	
After rejecting the children's movie Lucy, a Santola Amiga, Paraíso Filmes' creative minds opt to make a horror movie, based on The Exorcist. The idea prompts the studio to invest in special effects, such as Vanda Manassa causing Vanda Veloso's neck to do a near-360º rotation. Narciso is in charge of the green vomit scene and César Travassos makes his film debut playing the child's mother.
11	"O Rabejador (Gladiator)"	1 December 2001	
With the Americans producing Gladiator, Paraíso Filmes produces O Rabejador (roughly Tailcatcher). Its production turns problematic when Túlio Gonzaga disappears even before filming began, causing Belchior to become the director. In parallel with the release of the movie, Banheira 2000 launches a new toilet brush named after his colleague, Túlio Flush Flex 40. In the movie, Norberto Frias is the titular tailcatcher, which, after a conspiracy, falls into disgrace and threatens the bullfighters. Both César Travassos and Félix Manassa play the bull.
12	"O Novíssimo Testamento (The Ten Commandments)"	8 December 2001	
Belchior Baptista is revealed to be a man of faith and wants to make a religious movie to air on television on Easter Sunday and other Catholic celebrations. After the initial rejection from Catholic officials in Lisbon, he finds help from Brazilian bishop Ubaldino Valcir (alias Bibi) of Igreja Internacional do Império do Senhor (International Church of the Lord's Empire), to finance it with tithes. The Newest Testament ended up becoming a hybrid of commandments from both the Old and New Testaments, as well as the other episodes of uncertain origin, such as the discovery of Ivan, Moses' evil twin brother, author of the Ten Evil Commandments. This results in twenty commandments, ten from Moses and ten from Ivan.
13	"O Homem Que Mal se Vê (The Invisble Man)"	15 December 2001	
Belchior Baptista is accused of evading RTP funds to make television commercials for Banheira 2000. Facing problems regarding these accusations, he makes The Barely-Seen Man, a special effects thriller with no need for a lead actor, since the main character is invisible, seen as an economic advantage. Belchior later appoints Marlon Brando as its lead actor, just because he wore makeup and was an invisible man for filming. With little budget, the movie ends up being finished.

=== Season 2 (2002) ===
No. in series	Title	Original release date	Ref.
1	"Parque Inácio (Jurassic Park)"	2002	
Belchior is occupied with two projects: Parque Inácio, a pre-historic movie, and Cova Shopping, the newly launched mall at Cova do Vapor. A new member joins the Paraíso Filmes creative team, Sabino Pascoal, Banheira 2000's servant apprentice, better known as the "Sandokan of Setúbal]]". When work for Cova Shopping is interrupted, the discovery of bones from a dinosaur cause him to produce Parque Inácio, about Dr. Inácio, who used his backyard to take care of extinct dinosaurs. The problem is that these dinosaurs, in addition to being extinct, are also carnivore.
2	"Os Salteadores da Arca Frigorífica (Raiders of the Lost Ark)"	2002	
The future arrives to Paraíso Filmes, when Belchior acquired a ZX Spectrum for 500$00 at Feira da Ladra, which he confused for a Pentium. The time has arrived to make a videogame adaptation: that of the Portuguese explorer Laura Costa, her relation with her husband Africana Jonas, and the couple's journey to find the Fridge Ark.
3	"Ti'Anica (Titanic)"	2002	
Lourenço nas Arábias was going to be its next big production, if not for interference from the weather. When Lourenço begged for water in the desert, heavy rains hit Trafaria, causing Belchior to rethink his strategy. He then finds an idea from twenty years earlier: the love story between a secretaire from Cacilhas and a café owner from Terreiro do Paço in the supposedly unsinkable ferry Ti'Anica. Tragedy strikes when an iceberg (represented by a large block of styrofoam) capsizes it into the Tagus.
4	"Merd Max (Mad Max)"	2002	
The team makes the post-apocalyptic production Merd Max. To this end, Belchior launches a line of motorized toilets and bathtubs that could double as both movie props and bathroom items. Skilled scriptwriter Juvécio Antunes writes the plot, while the company also launches the talent of local singer Travestina Turner.
5	"Pirulito, o Quinto Passageiro (Alien)"	2002	
Belchior and Túlio revive Pirulito, a wasted TV puppeteer, to take part in the lead role of an alien who threatens to decimate all of the human staff in a spaceship. The team then puts Vanda Veloso as Pirulito's woman-of-arms, initiating a duel between the two. Because of the Christmas lights, the team opted to double it as a Christmas movie.
5	"Pirulito, o Quinto Passageiro (Alien)"	2002	
Belchior and Túlio revive Pirulito, a wasted TV puppeteer, to take part in the lead role of an alien who threatens to decimate all of the human staff in a spaceship. The team then puts Vanda Veloso as Pirulito's woman-of-arms, initiating a duel between the two. Because of the Christmas lights, the team opted to double it as a Christmas movie.
6	"Robófia (RoboCop)"	2002	
Robófia is a human-toilet hybrid, inspired by Félix Manassa's talent. Belchior recalls Robófia's origin story: Felix beat his school friend countless times causing him to use prosthetic parts. Like Félix, he too has parts of his body made out of bathroom parts, and one of the most advanced crime-fighting methods there are, at a time when criminality is on the rise. Robófia was played by Norberto Frias.
7	"Branca de Neve e os Seis Indivíduos Extremamente Baixos (Snow White and the Seven Dwarves)"	2002	
Paraíso Filmes launches a children's title simultaneously with the launch of a new chamber pot for the intended demographic: PenikXP. The solution was an animated film, but Sabino "Sandokan", alongside large amounts of paper and a marker, thought it wouldn't be enough. The solution was to make "the first live-action cartoon film" instead, where Snow White followed six "extremely small individuals": Chefe, Drogado, Calmeirão, Mãozinhas, Estúpido and Zé Naifas.
8	"T.S., o Extraterrestre (E.T. the Extra-Terrestrial)"	2002	
Belchior Baptista wants to makes a movie like E.T., creating T.S. (Tarado Sexual = sexual pervert). A pervert alien comes to Earth looking for Gina magazines and discovers sex with an attractive young blonde woman. Celso Matias interprets T.S., after Belchior's mother got rejected for the role.
9	"O Priminho (The Godfather)"	2002	
Belchior's criminal past puts his reputation in hot water for its next production, causing suspicions about the producer. The movie is being made while the team grapples with the effects of it, with Celso Matias as the titular Little Cousin. They eventually find out that Belchior's grandparents either came from Sicily or Rinchoa.
10	"Missão Improvável (Mission: Impossible)"	2002	
Worried about the rise of realism in crime movies, Belchior produces an action movie where, unlike most productions of its type, the lead character dies at the beginning instead of surviving up to the end. The idea is both groundbreaking and cheap. Meanwhile, Carlos Ruth exchanges with Sabino "Sandokan" to confuse Vanda Veloso.
11	"Supertuga (Superman)"	2002	
Paraíso Filmes finally brings a Portuguese superhero to the industry, Supertuga, considered to be the company's biggest production yet, by three of the four people who watched it. While Supertuga saves the country, Vanda Veloso saves Sabino "Sandokan", who is more excited about the titular hero than Sabino. All of the movie was shot in a bathroom.
12	"O Filme Terrorista/O Terrorista de Évora (Air Force One)"	2002	
Paraíso Filmes is not ready for the moment where reality surpassed fiction. Félix and Sabino were confused for potential terrorists at the US Embassy in Lisbon, and it was up to Belchior to negotiate for their freedom. Meanwhile, Túlio Gonzaga directs a film on terrorists from Alentejo who hijacked the private jet of the Portuguese president. Túlio works hard for the movie, unaware that Félix and Sabino are still hostages.
13	"O DVD Final (pastiche of DVD extras)"	2002	
RTP's contract with Paraíso Filmes has come to its end, but the team cannot bid farewell to the viewers without presenting their vinyl DVD with commentary from Belchior and Túlio, some extras, as well as highlights of the team's work.

== Airing ==
The first episode aired on 6 September 2001. Ratings were low to an extent that the series aired later at each episode, to an extent where it aired as late as 2am. Markl even joked that the series would air in the mornings. RTP refused to air the second season.

== Accolades ==
In April 2002, the series was selected to represent RTP at the Montreux International Television Festival.
