= Lumiar Studios =

First studio complex used by Rádiotelevisão Portuguesa

The Lumiar Studios (Estúdios do Lumiar) was the first studio complex used by Rádiotelevisão Portuguesa for its regular broadcasts. It started using them on 3 December 1956, and vacated them on 3 March 2007.

== História ==
After the experimental broadcasts conducted at Feira Popular de Lisboa, in September 1956, RTP began to prepare the infrastructure for its regular broadcasts, having provisionally selected studios in Lumiar. It would, however, be used for the next fifty years. In these studios, even before the launch of RTP, films such as A Morgadinha dos Canaviais, Chaimite and O Cerro dos Enforcados were produced.

Test transmissions from Lumiar began on 3 December 1956, with broadcasts between 3:50pm and 7pm, with short films and technical tests, totalling around 90 hours of broadcasts. In one of these experimental broadcasts, on 7 December 1956, the service began with announcer Álvaro Baptista Pereira announcing a two-minute suspension, in solidarity with the Hungarian people, due to the invasion of that country by the Soviet Union.

In the coming months, airtime increased in on Sundays, despite reducing the monthly amount in January 1957 to 71 hours. In February 1957, the first television news service, Jornal de Actualidades, aired from these studios, consisting of five minutes of read news and ten minutes of filmed material. In addition, in-vision announcing was introduced, coupled to that the visit of Elizabeth II to Portugal, its first outside broadcast.

Regular broadcasts from the facilities began on 7 March 1957, while the studios, as RTP's headquarters, took part in several key events of the history of television in Portugal, such as early editions of Festival RTP da Canção, the Carnation Revolution of 25 April 1974 (where the studios were occupied by the Armed Forces Movement), and others.

== Sale of the studios and current status ==
Since the license to use the studios was provisional, RTP decided to close the studios on 3 March 2007 (with a special broadcast from the location, E Depois do Adeus), and sold them on 25 May of the same year, for the sum of €15 million. However, only in 2011, the Arbitration Court favorably decided the record of capital gain of the sale, after the acquiring entity presented an arbitration requirement at the Lisbon Commercial Association, in 2009..

Since then, the buildings that include the studios are in an advanced state of decay.

== Studios ==
Initially, the studios had an area of 296 m², with Studio A having 4 camaras and Studio B (a former projection room), 2. Years later, the Lumiar cinema, originally founded in 1968, became a studio.

Its capacity grew over time, having, at most, five studios.

=== Studio A or 1 ===
It was the main studio, from where programs such as Telejornal, O Passeio dos Alegres, Festival RTP da Canção, and special election broadcasts. In addition, the proclamation from the National Salvation Junta was read from these studios on the early hours of 26 April 1974.

=== Studio B or 2 ===
These studios housed Telejornal (from the 1960s), the weather bulletin, Se Bem Me Lembro, as well as continuity announcements.

=== Studio C (Tóbis Cottinelli Telmo Studio) ===
Studio with 19,5 x 24,5 meters in area and 8 meters in height, rented by RTP to Tóbis Portuguesa between 1963 and 1970. Programs produced here included light television plays, as well as music and variety shows, such as the first five editions of Grande Prémio TV da Canção and light music programs. A coaxial cable linked the studio to the main complex.

=== Studio D or 3 ===
This studio was built from scratch and was already operational in 1968, in preparation for the launch of the second channel. This studio was a little larger than B and, like that one, was initially used for news programs, weather reports, announcements and low-production programs for both channels and with a continuity booth with a view for the studio where the following materials could be sent through the Technical Center: videotapes, telecine, studios and OB vans. In 1980, due to the start of color broadcasts, the studio was abandoned for not showing possibilities of refurbishing but went operational again from April 1982 after being subject to refurbishing to increase its area, as well as the installation of a new continuity booth and equipment.

=== Studio 4 ===
Operational from 21 March 1976, though part of a building whose work finished around one year earlier, Lumair's Studio 4, with an area of around 140m², was initially reserved to programs from the news unit, such as Telejornal and the coverage of the three electoral acts of that year. Game shows, children's programs and talk shows were also shot on this studio.
