= José Hermano Saraiva =

Portuguese historian, jurist and television presenter (1919–2012)

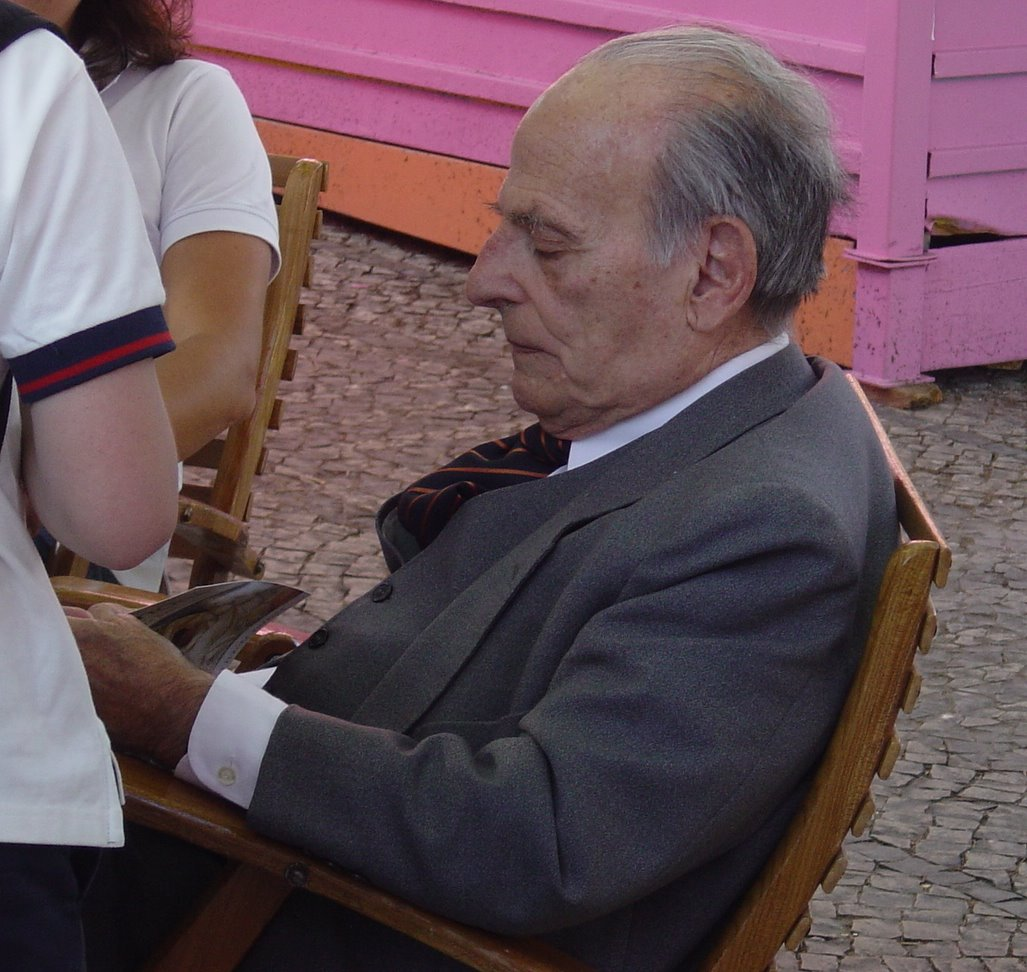

Portuguese Ambassador to Brazil
- In office 7 December 1972 – 19 May 1974
- President: Américo Tomás
- Prime Minister: Marcello Caetano

Minister of Education
- In office 19 August 1968 – 15 January 1970
- Prime Minister: António Oliveira Salazar; Marcello Caetano
- Preceded by: Inocêncio Galvão Teles
- Succeeded by: José Veiga Simão

Personal details
- Born: José Hermano Saraiva; 3 October 1919 Leiria, Portugal
- Died: 20 July 2012 (aged 92) Palmela, Portugal
- Spouse: Maria de Lourdes de Bettencourt de Sá Nogueira
- Education: University of Lisbon
- Profession: Jurist

José Hermano Saraiva GCIH • GCIP (3 October 1919 – 20 July 2012) was a Portuguese professor, historian and jurist. He was most known as a television personality in Portugal, having been the author and presenter of several documentary series of historical divulgation from 1971 to 2003 on the Portuguese television.

== Biography ==
Hermano Saraiva was a professor of law and business management. He was Minister of Education of Portugal between 1968 and 1970 and ambassador to Brazil between 1972 and 1974, during the Estado Novo dictatorship. He lectured in the Instituto Superior de Ciências Sociais e Política Ultramarina at the Universidade Técnica de Lisboa, and in private teaching institutes.

Saraiva is most famous in Portugal, but also among Portuguese communities around the world, on account of his television programs on the History of Portugal, broadcast by RTP. He was a member of the Sciences Academy of Lisbon, Portuguese Academy of History and São Paulo Historical Institute in Brazil.

Hermano Saraiva was distinguished with the Grã-Cruz of the Order of Public Instruction, Grã-Cruz of the Order of Prince Henry, the Grã-Cruz of the Order of Barão do Rio Branco of Brazil, the Grã-Cruz of the Ordem do Mérito do Trabalho and the Comendador da Real Ordem de Nossa Senhora da Conceição de Vila Viçosa.

He enjoyed wide popularity and success as a television communicator whose television programs devoted to the History of Portugal, namely O Tempo e a Alma (1971), Gente de Paz (1978) and Horizontes da Memória (1996-2003) on RTP state-run television channels, reached a large audience among the Portuguese population and the Portuguese expat communities outside Portugal.

== Personal life ==
Hermano Saraiva was born in Leiria, the third of the six sons of José Leonardo Venâncio Saraiva (born 1 April 1881, erudite and well known professor, Mayor of Leiria and Head Master of Liceu Passos Manuel in Lisbon) and wife Maria da Ressurreição Baptista Saraiva. Amongst his siblings is António José Saraiva, a known researcher in the area of literature, and his nephew José António Saraiva worked as a journalist and architect. One of his maternal uncles was the last living Portuguese veteran of the First World War.

Saraiva married Maria de Lourdes de Bettencourt de Sá Nogueira (born 16 May 1918), daughter of Rodrigo de Sá Nogueira (born 3 December 1892, a college professor and great-nephew of Bernardo de Sá Nogueira de Figueiredo, 1st Marquess of Sá da Bandeira) and wife Maria Luísa Rodrigues de Bettencourt (married 20 November 1915), fathering five children.

Saraiva died, aged 92, in Palmela.

== Bibliography ==
Memoirs:

- Saraiva, José Hermano (2007). Album de Memórias (in Portuguese). Lisbon: O SOL é essential S.A. ISBN 978-989-8120-00-7.

Academic lectures published by the Academia das Ciências de Lisboa:

- Testemunho Social e Condenação de Gil Vicente (1976)
- A Revolução de Fernão Lopes (1977)
- Elementos para uma nova biografia de Camões (1978)
- Proposta de uma Cronologia para a lírica de Camões (1981–82)
- Evocação de António Cândido (1988)
- No Centenário de Simão Bolívar (1984)
- A crise geral e a Aljubarrota de Froyssart (1988)

Works on teaching:

- Notas para uma didáctica assistencial (1964)
- Aos Estudantes (1969)
- A Pedagogia do Livro (1972)
- O Futuro da Pedagogia (1974)
- Aspirações e contradições da Pedagogia contemporânea (1970)

Legal works:

- O problema do Contrato (1949)
- A revisão constitucional e a eleição do Chefe do Estado (1959)
- Non-self-governing territories and The United Nation Charter (1960)
- Lições de Introdução ao Direito (1962–63)
- A Crise do Direito (1964)
- Apostilha Crítica ao Projecto do Código Civil (1966)
- A Lei e o Direito (1967)

History works:

- Uma carta do Infante D. Henrique (1948)
- As razões de um Centenário (1954)
- História Concisa de Portugal (1976, translated in Spanish, Italian, German, Bulgarian, Polish and Chinese)
- História de Portugal, 3 Vols – Director and co-author (1981)
- O Tempo e a Alma, 2 Vols (1986)
- Breve História de Portugal (1996)
- Portugal – Os Últimos 100 anos (1996)
- Portugal – a Companion History (1997)

Contributions for the History of the Portuguese People:

- Outras maneiras de ver (1979)
- Vida Ignorada de Camões (1980)
- Raiz madrugada (1981)
- Ditos Portugueses dignos de memória (1994)
- A memória das Cidades (1999)
- [...]

== Television shows ==
- O Tempo e a Alma (RTP)
- A Alma e a Gente (RTP)
- Horizontes da Memória (RTP)
- A Bruma da Memória (RTP)
- História Essencial de Portugal (RTP)
- Coisas do Mundo (Rádio e Televisão de Portugal)
