= Herman Enciclopédia =

Portuguese comedy television series

- Genre: Sketch comedy
- Directed by: Vítor Mamede
- Starring: Herman José; Maria Rueff; Vítor de Sousa; Miguel Guilherme; José Pedro Gomes; Joaquim Monchique
- Country of origin: Portugal
- Original language: Portuguese
- No. of seasons: 2
- No. of episodes: 13

Production
- Production location: Lisbon
- Production company: Edipim

Original release
- Network: RTP1
- Release: 15 April – 8 July 1997
- Release: 11 November 1997 – 17 February 1998

Herman Enciclopédia is a Portuguese sketch comedy television series broadcast for two seasons of thirteen episodes each on RTP1 between 1997 and 1998, with the participation of Herman José. Patterned after CD-ROM-based encyclopedias, each episode was about a specific theme, which often featured a studio-based introduction to the topic presented by Herman José himself.

The series presents a variety of sketches and characters, some of which were introduced in prior works. The series was written by the Produções Fictícias team.

== Recurring sketches ==
- Melga Shop: parody of infomercials with Herman José as Henrique Melga and José Pedro Gomes as Mike. The sketches showcased a variety of absurd products (often imagined by scriptwriter Nuno Markl)
- Lauro Dérmio Apresenta: parody of Lauro António's program for TVI, Lauro António Apresenta. Lauro Dérmio presented trailers and excerpts of fictional films, often parodies of existing ones, including the "2-in-1" genre which combined elements of two completely different movies. Another key trait was his repeated mispronounciation of English, often bordering on borderline literal translations. He was best known for the catchphrase "Let's look at the trailer".
- Diácono Remédios: Originally created for radio, the character (whose tentative name was Reverendo Remédios) was created due to the fallout of the Last Supper skit in late 1995. The character frequently interrupted sketches which were considered immoral in his worldview. His catchphrase, "(o artista é um bom artista,) não havia necessidade" (literally (the artist is a good artist,) there's no need for that) stemmed from a phrase Herman José's mother told him when he was a child.
- Quartet of businessmen from the North: a group of four businessmen from Porto who, in the first season, decided to clandestinely counter Expo '98 in Lisbon with Expo '97 in a wine cellar. The group was led by engineer Passos de Ferreira, architect Jorge Tawny, Dr. Mega Ribeira (whose opinions countered those of Jorge Tawny) and Antonieta Luz Afonso, who gave a more social tone to their interventions. For Expo '97, a Tripanário (based on the local dish Tripas à Moda do Porto) conceived to counter the Lisbon Oceanarium, the Pinto-Rei statue, a giant statue of FC Porto president Jorge Nuno Pinto da Costa larger than the Cristo-Rei statue in Lisbon in Gaia and an elliptical bridge. At the end of the first season, the projects failed due to the electricity bill being cut, of which Passos de Ferreira used its money to go to Lisbon to attend the Hipopótamo night club in Lisbon. In the second season, the quartet changed their idea and set up a political party, PNRN (Partido Nacional da Região Norte.
- Felisberto Desgraçado/Mãezinha Não t'Apagues: Felisberto Desgraçado is a fado singer who sung isolated songs in season 1, whereas in season 2, he became the main character of Mãezinha Não t'Apagues, a "burlesque" telenovela. In the series, Felisberto tried to do everything he could to take her mother to the United States to receive critical treatment.
- Monólogos Secretos: parody of SIC's late night talk-show Conversas Secretas, presented by Artista Bastos, itself a parody of Baptista Bastos. His catchphrase to the interviewees was "Where were you on April 25?".
- Super-Tia: parody of the upper class from the eyes of Super-Tia (Herman José) and her sidekick Robinha (Joaquim Monchique). Her equivalent to kryptonite was possidonite, represented by a golf ball.
- Sexo Para Todos: introduced in season 2, it was presented by Rute Remédios, based on Ruth Westheimer, which is the mother of Diácono Remédios.
- Herman Geographic: originally created for Parabéns, the segments are a parody of David Attenborough's wildlife documentaries, presented by a caricature called David Vaittenborough (played by Herman José). He speaks with a mock British accent, but in Herman Enciclopédia, but his voice is dubbed over in Brazilian Portuguese (by Herman himself), mimicking the style of documentary channels found on cable television at the time. The character was revived for a sketch in the Eurovision Song Contest 2018.

== Episodes ==
Season	Episodes	Originally released	
Season	Episodes	First released	Last released
1	13	15 April 1997	8 July 1997
2	13	11 November 1997	17 February 1998
