= Produções Fictícias =

Portuguese media company

- Type: Private
- Industry: Media
- Founded: 1 April 1993; 33 years ago
- Founder: Nuno Artur Silva
- Headquarters: Rua Melvin Jones, nº 12 A, 1600-867, Lisbon, Portugal
- Key people: André Caldeira; Michelle Costa Adrião
- Products: O Eixo do Mal; Gato Fedorento; Contra Informação; Filme da Treta; DVDs; Print publication
- Owners: André Caldeira (50%); Michelle Costa Adrião (50%)
- Members: 100 (2015)
- Website: Official website

Produções Fictícias is a Portuguese creative agency, producer and co-producer, created on 1 April 1993 by Nuno Artur Silva, which develops projects for television, radio, cinema, press, theatre, books and DVDs.

Since 2015, the company is jointly managed by André Caldeira and Michelle Costa Adrião.

== History ==
The company was founded in 1993 as a group of scriptwriters for radio and television. Among its early tasks was the writing of sketches for Herman José's radio and television programs at the time. One of its founding writers was Nuno Markl, who, alongside Artur Silva, co-wrote the controversial Last Supper sketch in 1995. Its staff had creative freedom, being inspired by the style of American comedians such as Jay Leno, Conan O'Brien or Jim Carey, instead of the "poor" Portuguese ones.

In November 2004, it planned to bring its print publication, O Inimigo Público, to television, distancing itself from an emulation of The Daily Show under the grounds that it wasn't going to be a talk-show. That same year, another one of its projects, O Eixo do Mal, premiered on SIC Notícias, a weekly program with a "vaguely ironic tone".

For its thirteenth anniversary on 1 April 2006, it released 13 Anos de Insucessos, an autobiography of the company.

It applied for a television license in 2009, ultimately becoming Canal Q, which started broadcasting on 29 March 2010, broadcasting exclusively original content.

In November 2019, Nuno Artur Silva sold the company to his nephew. In June 2020, in the wake of the sale, it was revealed that Produções Fictícias only made one program for RTP in the five-year period between 2015 and 2019, which was a documentary co-produced with RTP and the Calouste Gulbenkian Foundation, costing €25,000.

== Notable projects ==
- Gato Fedorento (2003-2013)
- Estado de Graça (2011-2012)
- Os Contemporâneos (2008-2009)
- Contra Informação (1996-2010)
- O Inimigo Público (formerly on Público, now on Expresso)
- Several programs with Herman José:
  - Parabéns (and HermanZap)
  - Herman Enciclopédia
  - Herman 98
  - Herman 99
  - HermanSic
  - Herman 2010-2013
  - Há Vida Em Markl (Antena 3)
- O Homem que Mordeu o Cão (Rádio Comercial)
- O Eixo do Mal (SIC Notícias)
- Filme da Treta
- Conversa da Treta
- Paraíso Filmes (RTP)
- O Programa da Maria (SIC, 2001)
- Manobras de Diversão
- Inspector Max (scripts, early seasons)
