= Edipim =

Portuguese media company

Edipim was a television production company located in Abrunheira, Sintra. It was an independent production company that produced the most varied types of television formats.

The company was founded on October 1, 1978, but it already existed before, as António Sala's debut as a television presenter took place in 1972 with the program "Música Maestro", which was Edipim's first production.

The company's two main creators were Thilo Krasmann and Vitor Mamede, who would also be the main producers of its television productions. The two formed PIM (Produtores Independentes de Música, Independent Music Producers) because of the recordings they made together. When they made the company official, they were unable to use the intended name, so they decided to use the name Edipim.

It was Edipim that created the first Portuguese soap opera, Vila Faia, opening the studios in Abrunheira, Sintra. The invitation came after the production of the program Eu Show Nico in 1980 where there was a fictional telenovela called Moita Carrasco. From playing they went on to a serious telenovela where Nicolau Breyner and the accomplished Nuno Teixeira continued.

Its second production was the series 'Gente Fina é Outra Coisa' and then the second Portuguese telenovela, Origens. In 1987, it produced the programs Eu Show Nico and Lá Em Casa Tudo Bem.

Other programs such as Joaquim Letria Outras Músicas, Humor de Perdição, 1000 Imagens, Top Mais, Parabéns and Herman Enciclopédia followed, aired by RTP. Thilo Krassman sold its 51% share to Radiotelevisão Comercial, RTP's commercial arm.

After the opening of television to the private sector, the company produced the programs Bom Baião and Um Sarilho Chamado Marina for SIC, and Quem Tudo Quer for TVI. Other programs produced for RTP in the late 90s were Há Horas Felizes, Não És Homem Não És Nada and A Última Noite.

In the sound studio, with capacity for recording jingles and bands, records were produced such as the album 'Cheio' by UHF and 'Acústico' by Júlio Pereira.

In 2001, RTP, which had purchased the rest of Edipim in 2000, combined Edipim with the production company FO&CO (which already belonged to the RTP group). In December 2002, it was decided that RTP would merge its two production companies in line with its corporate restructuring. In 2004, Edipim closed its doors, as it was dissolved, together with FO&CO, to make way for RTP - Meios de Produção.

Numerous programs produced by Edipim were shot at the Abrunheira studios; post-2003, these were used for series such as the first run of Conta-me Como Foi. RTP announced its intention to sell the complex for €1,5 million on 29 September 2026.
