= List of ambassadors of Portugal to Brazil =

Ambassador of Portugal to Brazil
- Embaixador de Portugal no Brasil
- Incumbent; Luís Filipe Melo e Faro Ramos since 30 October 2020
- Style: His Excellency (formal); Mr. Ambassador (informal)
- Residence: SES 801, Lote 02, Setor de Embaixadas Sul - Asa Sul, Brasília
- Appointer: President of Portugal with the advice and consent of the Government of Portugal
- Inaugural holder: Carlos Matias Pereira as Chargé d'Affaires
- Website: brasilia.embaixadaportugal.mne.gov.pt/pt/

The Portuguese ambassador in Brasília is the official representative of the Portuguese Government in Lisbon to the Government of Brazil.

== List of representatives ==
| Representative | Title | Presentation of credentials | Termination of mission |
|---|---|---|---|
| Carlos Matias Pereira | Chargé d'Affaires | 14 April 1826 | 5 July 1827 |
| João Baptista Moreira | Chargé of the Consulate and interim Chargé d'Affaires | 6 July 1827 | 1830 |
| Count of Sabugal | Envoy Extraordinary and Minister Plenipotentiary | 25 June 1830 | 17 March 1831 |
| João Baptista Moreira | Interim Chargé d'Affaires and Consul General | Unknown | 14 July 1833 |
| Joaquim Barroso Pereira | Interim Chargé d'Affaires and Consul General | Unknown | Unknown |
| Joaquim António de Magalhães | Resident Minister | Unknown | 1836 |
| João Baptista Moreira | Interim Chargé d'Affaires | 24 December 1837 | 1 May 1839 |
| Joaquim C. de Figaniére e Morão | Resident Minister | 2 May 1839 | 30 July 1840 |
| Ildefonso Leopoldo Bayard | Minister Plenipotentiary | 31 July 1840 | 18 June 1843 |
| José de Vasconcellos e Sousa | Interim Chargé d'Affaires | Unknown | 21 July 1847 |
| José de Vasconcellos e Sousa | Minister Plenipotentiary | 2 October 1847 | 15 July 1854 |
| João Gomes de Oliveira | Interim Chargé d'Affaires | Unknown | 12 April 1856 |
| Joaquim António Gonçalves Macieira | Interim Chargé d'Affaires | 9 April 1856 | 9 July 1857 |
| José de Vasconcellos e Sousa | Minister Plenipotentiary | 18 July 1857 | 29 May 1859 |
| Joaquim António Gonçalves Macieira | Interim Chargé d'Affaires | Unknown | 5 September 1859 |
| António Bernardo da Costa Cabral | Minister Plenipotentiary | 6 September 1859 | 5 November 1860 |
| Joaquim António Gonçalves Macieira | Interim Chargé d'Affaires | Unknown | 9 July 1862 |
| José de Vasconcellos e Sousa | Minister Plenipotentiary | 12 July 1862 | 1 January 1869 |
| Daniel da Silva Ribeiro | Interim Chargé d'Affaires | Unknown | 5 March 1869 |
| Fausto de Queirós Guedes | Interim Chargé d'Affaires | Unknown | 18 October 1869 |
| Matias de Carvalho e Vasconcelos | Minister Plenipotentiary | 23 October 1869 | 15 February 1877 |
| Manuel Garcia da Rosa | Interim Chargé d'Affaires | Unknown | 1 September 1877 |
| José Ferreira Borges de Castro | Minister Plenipotentiary | 4 September 1877 | 7 December 1879 |
| Manuel Garcia da Rosa | Interim Chargé d'Affaires | Unknown | 23 November 1882 |
| António Maria Tovar de Lemos Pereira | Minister Plenipotentiary | 25 November 1882 | 8 July 1886 |
| Duarte Gustavo Nogueira Soares | Minister Plenipotentiary | Unknown | 17 January 1889 |
| Manuel Garcia da Rosa | Interim Chargé d'Affaires | Unknown | 3 June 1891 |
| Carlos Eugénio Correia da Silva | Minister Plenipotentiary | 20 June 1891 | 21 November 1893 |
| Manuel Garcia da Rosa | Interim Chargé d'Affaires | Unknown | 22 February 1894 |
| Miguel Aleixo António do Carmo de Noronha | Interim Chargé d'Affaires | Unknown | 6 June 1894 |
| Tomás Ribeiro | Minister Plenipotentiary | 30 May 1895 | 10 January 1896 |
| António Duarte de Oliveira Soares | Interim Chargé d'Affaires | Unknown | 21 January 1896 |
| João de Oliveira Sá Camello Lampreia | Interim Chargé d'Affaires | Unknown | 30 November 1896 |
| António José Enes | Minister Plenipotentiary | 23 December 1896 | 20 October 1897 |
| Thomás Ribeiro de Mello | Interim Chargé d'Affaires | Unknown | 8 November 1897 |
| João de Oliveira Sá Camello Lampreia | Interim Chargé d'Affaires | Unknown | 4 June 1900 |
| Luiz de Arenas de Lima | Interim Chargé d'Affaires | Unknown | 17 October 1900 |
| João de Oliveira Sá Camello Lampreia | Minister Plenipotentiary | Unknown | 9 October 1907 |
| Carlos de Castro Faria | Interim Chargé d'Affaires | Unknown | 1 June 1908 |
| António José da Franca e Horta Machado | Minister Plenipotentiary | 8 July 1908 | 27 October 1910 |
| Bernardino Machado | Minister Plenipotentiary | 23 July 1912 | 31 December 1913 |
| Amadeu Ferreira de Almeida Carvalho | Interim Chargé d'Affaires | Unknown | 7 December 1914 |
| Duarte Leite | Ambassador | 21 December 1914 | 1 May 1931 |
| Valentim Augusto da Silva | Interim Chargé d'Affaires | Unknown | 1 June 1932 |
| Martinho Nobre de Melo | Ambassador | 7 June 1932 | 18 September 1945 |
| Carlos Pedro Pinto Ferreira | Chargé d'Affaires | Unknown | 1 June 1946 |
| Pedro Teotónio Pereira | Ambassador | 8 January 1946 | 28 July 1947 |
| Luis de Castro e Almeida Mendes Norton de Matos | Chargé d'Affaires | Unknown | 10 May 1948 |
| João António de Bianchi | Ambassador | Unknown | 19 December 1949 |
| António Leite Cruz | Interim Chargé d'Affaires | Unknown | 12 September 1950 |
| António Augusto Braga Leite de Faria | Ambassador | September 1950 | 12 January 1958 |
| Armando Ramos de Paula Coelho | Interim Chargé d'Affaires | Unknown | 16 May 1958 |
| Manuel Farrajota Ferreira | Ambassador | Unknown | 11 August 1961 |
| João de Deus Battaglia Ramos | Ambassador | 14 September 1961 | 17 November 1966 |
| Adriano António de Carvalho | Chargé d'Affaires | Unknown | 12 February 1967 |
| José Manuel de Magalhães Pessoa e Fragoso | Ambassador | 17 February 1967 | 20 September 1972 |
| Manuel Joaquim Lopes de Sá Machado | Chargé d'Affaires | Unknown | 2 December 1972 |
| José Hermano Saraiva | Ambassador | 7 December 1972 | 19 May 1974 |
| António Manuel da Veiga e Meneses Cordeiro | Chargé d'Affaires | Unknown | 1 August 1974 |
| Vasco Futscher Pereira | Ambassador | 8 August 1974 | 27 May 1977 |
| Nuno Maria da Cunha e Távora Silveira e Lorena | Chargé d'Affaires | Unknown | 5 July 1977 |
| José Eduardo Meneses Rosa | Ambassador | 14 July 1977 | 23 June 1981 |
| Carlos Miguel Lencastre Teixeira da Mota | Chargé d'Affaires | Unknown | 12 August 1981 |
| Adriano António de Carvalho | Ambassador | 1 September 1981 | 7 July 1989 |
| Leonardo Mathias | Ambassador | 26 July 1989 | 12 October 1993 |
| Pedro José Ribeiro de Meneses | Ambassador | 4 October 1993 | 13 November 1997 |
| Francisco José Colaço Treichler Knopfli | Ambassador | 27 November 1997 | 3 July 2001 |
| António Manuel Canastreiro Franco | Ambassador | Unknown | 17 December 2004 |
| Francisco Seixas da Costa | Ambassador | 4 April 2005 | 31 December 2008 |
| João Manuel Guerra Salgueiro | Ambassador | Unknown | 20 July 2011 |
| José Rui Velez Caroço | Interim Chargé d'Affaires | Unknown | 2 March 2012 |
| Francisco Ribeiro Telles | Ambassador | 20 September 2012 | 10 August 2016 |
| Jorge Tito de Vasconcelos Nogueira Dias Cabral | Ambassador | 27 October 2016 | Unknown |
| Luís Filipe Melo e Faro Ramos | Ambassador | | incumbent |
