= Chuva de Maio =

- Genre: Musical
- Developed by: Edipim
- Directed by: Paula Pacheco
- Starring: António Pinto Basto; Sofia Brito; José Arantes; João Baião; António Pinto Basto; Margarida Carpinteiro; Carmen Dolores
- Country of origin: Portugal
- Original language: Portuguese

Production
- Running time: 45 minutes

Original release
- Network: RTP

Chuva de Maio is a 1990 Portuguese musical television series broadcast by RTP. It has been rerun on RTP Memória.

== Cast ==
- António Pinto Basto as Rodrigo
- Sofia Brito as Sara
- José Arantes
- João Baião
- António Pinto Basto
- Margarida Carpinteiro
- Carmen Dolores
- Curado Ribeiro
- Laura Soveral
