= Conta Lá =

- Country: Portugal

Programming
- Language: Portuguese
- Picture format: 16:9 (720p, SDTV)

Ownership
- Owner: Conta Lá, Conteúdos, Holding Audiovisual SA

History
- Launched: 5 September 2025; 14 months ago
- Closed: 1 November 2026; 11 days ago

Conta Lá was a Portuguese television company and operator the television channel of the same name. With emphasis on the regions of Portugal, most of the channel's staff consisted of former TVI alumni.

The channel faced financial problems in mid-2026 and shut down on 1 November.

== History ==
The company was registered in October 2024 to provide two television channels, a rural channel (TV Rural) and a regional affairs channel (+ Regiões). One of the company's CEOs was Sérgio Figueiredo. A private presentation ceremony was held on October 15.

The company made its first television broadcast with a pop-up channel, FNA 2025, covering the National Agriculture Fair, from June 7 to June 10, 2025. The channel featured Rita Ferro Rodrigues, Paulo Salvador, Marcos Pinto and Luís Varela de Almeida, already hired by the new company, as its presenters. Shortly after this test event, the entrance of new shareholders was being done.

On August 13, 2025, it was reported that there were talks for the renting of Porto Canal's studios to serve as an office in the north. The plan was negotiated by former secretary of state Miguel Alves.

The company announced plans for the 2025 local elections, covering 278 municipalities.

ERC approved the Conta Lá regional channels (Conta Lá Norte, Conta Lá Centro and Conta Lá Sul) on August 29, 2025. Broadcasts will start on September 5, with the airing of twelve local election debates a day, but a permanent service is not ready yet. The test phase will end on October 13, while the debates will end on September 26.

As part of the channel's experimental character, it appointed two AI presenters for the coverage of election night. The channel would use artificial intelligence tools as auxiliary tools and not to replace journalists.

After its coverage of the local elections, the channel suspended on October 14 and plans to start its regular broadcasts at the end of the year. These will begin on December 11. The full site launched on December 1.

Regular broadcasts started on December 11, 2025. Over time, new programs emerged, forming its full schedule, including Juca, a talk show presented by Júlio Magalhães. Early 2026 saw the premiere of Juca, presented by Júlio Magalhães, in prime time. In March, it aired the Michelin Gala from Savory Palace in Funchal.

=== Financial problems ===
At the end of February 2026, Conta Lá left its Porto offices after having used the facilities without paying for them.

On 15 May, Paulo Salvador left the channel due to supposed lack of payments.

At the end of June 2026, its staff moved to lay-off. It was reported that, during June, the channel attracted an average of 500 viewers. The Journalists' Union considered the situation to be unacceptable and showed its concerns over the June payments not coming on time.

On 15 July 2026, Sérgio Figueiredo announced that he would leave the channel and announced a general assembly by the end of the month to approve a restructuring plan. The company did not pay wages for its staff since May. A general assembly was scheduled for 6 August. The staff did not pay its July salaries and that new developments would arrive after the general assembly took place. The general assembly was suspended on 6 August and would not restart until 12 August with the plan to recover the channel's finances. Paulo Rego, of Plataforma Macau, was interested in joining and traced a recovery plan.

Precisely during the crisis, ERC released a report on the channel's airing of O Melhor Natal de Portugal from 11 December 2025 to January 2026, as well as its coverage of the ANMP conference on 13-14 December 2025. In both cases, ERC noticed that both programs received sponsorship from the municipalities, however they were not labeled as such.

A group of over 50 staff demanded that Conta Lá should be dissolved. As of October 19, the €5 million injection had not arrived. There is the possibility of shutting down. As of 28 October, the channel has €504,000 in debt, and the largest debtor is Coral Europa with over half the amount. Days earlier, the channel moved to a higher slot on MEO (channel 168) and Maurício Ribeiro is calling the TV providers to keep it active. Ibertelco is in charge of the playout and is only airing a 24-hour loop of prior programming under the pretext that an Angolan company will save it. On NOS, it was on channel 123 since its inception, and on channel 999 on Vodafone.

== Shutdown ==
Precisely at midnight on 1 November 2026, following the relocation to a new slot on MEO, Conta Lá shut down its signal to NOS, MEO and Vodafone—each provider replaced its feed with a slide saying the channel was unavailable due to "technical difficulties". The channel's social media has been inactive since July, though its last Facebook post was dated from 13 October. The site became inactive due to a PHP issue.

Maurício Ribeiro wrote on his LinkedIn account that the capital invested was insufficient to assure its sustainability, and that the initial tranche for new capital did not arrive in time for December.

In the aftermath of its closure, Júlio Magalhães returned to TVI.

== Corporate structure ==
The company delivered a multiplatform service on linear TV, online and OTT. It also used artificial intelligence to personalize its online services, as well as to recreate TV Rural presenter Sousa Veloso, who died in 2014.
