= Ilda Aurora Pinheiro de Moura Machado =

First female meteorologist in Portugal

- Born: 30 December 1918; Porto
- Died: 11 May 2000 (aged 81); Lisbon
- Alma mater: University of Porto; University of Coimbra
- Occupation: Meteorologist
- Employer: Instituto Português do Mar e da Atmosfera (1946–1997)
- Known for: First female meteorologist in Portugal

Ilda Aurora Pinheiro de Moura Machado (1918-2000) was the first female meteorologist in Portugal.

== Early life ==
Ilda Aurora Pinheiro de Moura Machado was born in Porto in Portugal on 30 December 1918. Both of her parents were primary school teachers. After attending her parents’ school, she transferred to the Carolina Michaelis High School, in Porto, which at that time only admitted girls. She also attended Porto's Conservatory of Music, where she completed courses in Singing, Piano and Composition. After finishing high school, where she received an award for being the best student, she enrolled at the University of Porto, where she studied mathematics for three years. She then moved to the University of Coimbra, taking degrees in Mathematics and Geographic Engineering as well as Pedagogical Sciences. After completing her music studies, she obtained a scholarship to study singing in Italy but was unable to take this up because of World War II.

== Early employment ==
Machado married in 1939. She found it difficult to get a job. In some cases, this was because of discrimination against women: in others, the employer argued that she had too many qualifications. She eventually found a job as a teacher in Porto. Joining the Portuguese Union of Geographic Engineers, she was subsequently asked to head a team in Lisbon that was responsible for surveying Portuguese towns and cities to make maps. All the others working on the project were men. Due to the war, however, the company closed.

== Meteorology ==
She then managed to obtain an internship for meteorologists at the Faculty of Sciences of the University of Lisbon, thus beginning her professional career. She was to remain the only female meteorologist in Portugal for the next 17 years. In 1946, when the National Weather Service of Portugal, now Instituto Português do Mar e da Atmosfera (IPMA), was created, she was based in the city of Porto, in which she remained until 1951. Then, returning to Lisbon, she continued her professional career, becoming, in January 1983, the Head of the Division of Marine Meteorology at the weather service. Continuing with her singing, she was one of the founders of a Choral Group at IPMA, called O Tempo Canta (The weather sings). She died in Lisbon on 11 May 2000.
