= Instituto Português do Mar e da Atmosfera =

Portuguese sea and atmosphere institute

- Abbreviation: IPMA
- Established: 3 October 1946 (79 years ago)
- Headquarters: Lisbon
- Location: Rua C do Aeroporto, 1749-077 Lisboa
- Country: Portugal
- Coordinates: 38°46′34″N 9°07′33″W
- Parent organisations: Ministry of the Sea
- Website: www.ipma.pt/en

The Instituto Português do Mar e da Atmosfera (lit. 'Portuguese Institute of the Sea and the Atmosphere'; abbreviated as IPMA) is the national meteorological, seismic, sea and atmospheric organization of Portugal. It also provides the weather for RTP's channels.

== History ==
What is now IPMA was originally created in 1946 as the National Meteorological Service (Serviço Metereológico Nacional, SMN), which centralized the functions of the previous existing meteorological sectorial services (Civil Aviation, Army, Military Aeronautics, Navy and Agriculture) as well as the Azores regional meteorological service and part of the university meteorological institutes. In 1976, the SMN was renamed National Institute of Meteorology and Geophysics (Instituto Nacional de Meteorologia e Geofísica, INMG) and then renamed Institute of Meteorology (Instituto de Meteorologia, IM) in 1993. It was renamed in 2012, when the agency assumed responsibility for the fisheries and sea research that were formerly under other agencies.

== People ==
Meteorologists who have worked for IPMA include:

- Ilda Aurora Pinheiro de Moura Machado
