= Desporto 2 =

- Genre: Sports show
- Country of origin: Portugal
- Original language: Portuguese

Production
- Running time: 4 hours

Original release
- Network: RTP2 (1996-present) RTP África (1998-2012) RTP Internacional (1996-2012)
- Release: 3 May 1996 – present

Desporto 2 is a Portuguese television sports show that airs at weekends on RTP2.
