= Rochester Telephone Company =

“Rochester Telephone Company” may refer to:

- Rochester Telephone (New York), a company founded in 1920 and changed its name to Frontier Corporation.
- Frontier Telephone of Rochester, a telephone company founded in 1994 as Rochester Telephone Company, now a subsidiary of Frontier Communications
