= TV Rural =

- Created by: Sousa Veloso
- Country of origin: Portugal
- Original language: Portuguese

Production
- Production locations: Lisbon, Portugal
- Running time: 30 minutes

Original release
- Network: RTP1
- Release: 1959 – 16 September 1990

Related
- À Mão de Semear (1990-1994)

TV Rural was a long-running Portuguese television program dedicated to agriculture, which ran on RTP1 from 1959 to 1990.

Created and presented by agricultural engineer Sousa Veloso, it was one of the longest-running television programs other than Telejornal.

== Overview ==
The idea for the program came from then-agricultural minister Quartin Graça and had the collaboration of the Ministry of Agriculture and Marcello Caetano. The program ran for an average length of 30 minutes.

At closing time, it was the weekly program with the most longevity on Portuguese television, with tis first broadcast on December 6, 1960, ending on September 15, 1990, without any interruptions, being replaced by contractual reasons by "À Mão de Semear" with the same theme, during the 1990 RTP relaunch. Initially it was shown during prime time, at around 8pm on Sundays, but over time it aired on earlier timeslots, until its conclusion, when it ended up being shown on Saturdays at 9am.

Sousa Veloso's phrase that ended the program – except in the last one – became famous:

"despeço-me com amizade até ao próximo programa".

The name of the program served as inspiration for a band.

In 2013, per initiative of members of the Social Democratic Party and CDS at the Portuguese parliament, a proposal was given for RTP to TV Rural or a similar program.

In 2024, Sérgio Figueiredo proposed the creation of two new channels for his company Conta Lá, with one of the channels being named TV Rural. It was revealed in September 2025 that the channel will use an AI avatar of Sousa Veloso, under the consent of his sons.
