= José Pedro Gomes =

Portuguese actor, author, and theatre director

José Pedro Gomes (born 28 December 1951, in Lisbon) is a Portuguese actor, author and theatre director.

He received formation at the Théâtre du Soleil (in 1970), at the Teatro da Cornucópia, with professors of the Bristol Old Vic School (in 1981) and, in 1991, at the Calouste Gulbenkian Foundation, with Polina Klimovitskaya.

== Career ==
In 1976, José Pedro Gomes began his professional activity, having worked with several groups, like Teatro Proposta, Teatro da Graça, Teatro da Cornucópia, Teatro O Bando, Teatro Aberto, and Comuna. He was also at the Centro Cultural de Belém and the Teatro Nacional D. Maria II. He is currently a regular presence in plays at the Teatro Villarett.

In television, he worked with Herman José in Casino Royal, Crime na Pensão Estrelinha, Herman Enciclopédia, Herman 98/99 and O Lampião da Estrela, and also acted in television films. He gained popularity alongside António Feio, in Conversa da Treta (broadcast by SIC, and later transposed to theatre and film — Filme da Treta).

As what regards films, he was directed by Manuel Mozos, Margarida Cardoso, José de Pina, José Sacramento, Leonel Vieira, among others.

He is also author/performer of the radio chronicle Os Cromos TSF (TSF).

On 29 July 2010, his friend and co-worker from "Conversa da Treta" and other plays, António Feio, died after a year-long struggle against pancreatic cancer at age 55.

== Filmography ==
- 1996 : Sur un air de mambo
