= Filme da Treta =

Filme da Treta is a Portuguese comedy movie directed by José Sacramento. It stars José Pedro Gomes and António Feio, and was the highest-grossing Portuguese film in 2006.
