= Meteorologia (RTP) =

Weather broadcasts in Portugal

Meteorologia is the current name given to the weather forecasts broadcast on RTP's channels, supplied by Instituto Português do Mar e da Atmosfera. First broadcast in 1962, the format underwent changes in name and content, and had varying importance over time.

== History ==
A contract was signed between RTP and Serviço Meteorológico Nacional in 1961. The first weather bulletin wasn't shown until November 1, 1962. Up until then, the weather was read by the presenter of the late news. The first name was Boletim do Serviço Meteorológico Nacional, later renamed Boletim Meteorológico. The bulletin aired after the main edition of Telejornal. Each bulletin lasted, on average, three minutes. In the early years, the meteorologist in charge arrived before 8pm, to draw the forecast on the maps - RTP used green boards with the details drawn using chalk. Due to the lack of satellite images, meteorologists had to draw the exact coordinates. Early weathermen were Rodrigo Carvalho, Weber Raposo, José Marques and Humberto Fonseca, and later António Malheiro, Roberto Carvalho, and the most notorious of them all, Azorean-born Anthímio de Azevedo, who arrived in 1964. He left RTP in the late 1980s.

Although satellite technology was made available in the mid-1970s, the weathermen by 1984 took printed images from the institute by paper and later sent to RTP where the camera was being pointed. Over time, the weather forecast was either attached or detached from Telejornal. On Fim de Semana, in the 1983–1984 season, Anthímio appeared behind transparent maps, starting with a surface map for Europe, followed by the maps for Portugal. His forecasts in this period also alluded to past meteorological events, in the week-long forecast. In 1984, O Tempo separated from Telejornal. From 1984 to 1986 its intro was a cel-animated cube with images alluding to the four seasons, accompanied by the Spring section of Vivaldi's The Four Seasons. In 1986–1987, Jornal da Tarde ended with a caricature of the main weather condition while the presenter was reading the forecast out-of-vision.

The forecasters disappeared in 1990, being replaced by an entirely out-of-vision bulletin. In addition to the weather for Portugal, a small segment with weather conditions for Europe was added. Canal 2/TV2 also started having its own bulletins. Canal 2 had four bulletins using its own graphics. During this phase, RTP used Memory of Antarctica and Antarctic Echoes, from Greek composer Vangelis, as background music.

The emergence of private television caused RTP to change its strategies for the weather, as it was seen as a loss of advertising time in this new environment. The weather bulletin was changed in 1994 to feature a map of Portugal divided in regions, with an arrow pointing at the current condition, enabling the appearance of the details by region. Following the 1996 RTP rebrand, meteorologists returned to deliver the forecast. By 2000 the forecast was delivered out-of-vision.

Following the 2002 rebrand, RTP started delivering CGI maps on Bom Dia Portugal and all other news bulletins of the group. 2002 also saw the introduction of a weather section on RTP's website, providing the maps for the Portuguese regions as well as weather for international cities. These were replaced by plain maps upon the 2004 rebrand on RTP1 and on international channels. RTP2 regained its weather bulletin with its own graphics.

In late 2006, RTP was studying the possibility of having weather forecasts with meteorologists. Anthímio de Azevedo thought that the 7pm slot was adequate, yet Costa Alves demanded it to be before Telejornal. On March 5, 2007, RTP1's Bom Dia Portugal and Portugal em Directo started delivering weather bulletins with meteorologists again, featuring new graphics and the largest weather touch screen device in Europe at the time, made by Displax. For the main bulletins (Jornal da Tarde and Telejornal) a plain map was used.

On April 30, 2014, the contract between IPMA and RTP ended, ending the use of meteorologists on RTP, being replaced by out-of-vision bulletins. The last bulletin on Bom Dia Portugal, presented by Teresa Abrantes, ended with a message saying that Portugal was becoming "one of the few countries, if not, the only country in Europe to air the weather forecast, at least on one of the television channels". Presented weather bulletins returned in April 2017, briefly having a slot before the main news.

Meteorologists still appear rarely on the main news, but only to talk about given meteorological phenomena. The lack of attention given to the weather on RTP's channels has also been a recurring theme on Voz do Cidadão.
