= José Sacramento =

Portuguese film director (born 1965)

José Sacramento (born 1965) is a film director and producer from Portugal. His movie Filme da Treta was the highest-grossing Portuguese film in 2006.
