= Diz que é uma Espécie de Magazine =

Diz que é uma Espécie de Magazine (English: They Say It's a Kind of Magazine) was a satirical talk show/magazine by the Gato Fedorento comedy group. Although it is considered a "fifth season" from the authors, it's a completely different show, based on the previous one, as the new format satirized public figures instead of anonymous characters. It was broadcast every Sunday on or around 9:30PM, on RTP1, and had two seasons in total. A special episode aired on June 10, 2007, ending the first season.

An extra making-of episode was also broadcast on June 12.

The program has been critically acclaimed since the first episodes and was, at the time, one of the most-watched shows on Portuguese television. Although enjoyed by the public, with all but the first episode of its first season receiving a share of over 10%, the group has been the target of many complaints about making fun of Portuguese public figures, especially politicians.

The show ended on December 31, 2007, in New Year's Eve special set in 1984-1985.

== Overview ==
Gato Fedorento's fourth series (Lopes da Silva) was the first one to be aired on RTP1 after three seasons on SIC Radical. For the 2006-2007 television season, the group moved to Sunday night primetime, replacing the extant format of anonymous sketches with caricatures of public figures. The decision was taken by member José Diogo Quintela before viewers complained about the repetition of the old format. The early 2006 agreement envisioned 52 half-hours: the first thirteen of which were for the Lopes da Silva series; the remainder for the new show.

The first season ended on June 10, 2007 with an extended special based on the Tesourinhos Deprimentes segment. It was announced that a second season was due to premiere in mid-September, with some nuances.

== Sketches ==
=== Telejornal (Daily News) ===
This sketch is meant to describe how awkward the events of corruption and politics have been for the past weeks. The fictional News is presented by a random member of Gato Fedorento who spends the few minutes of the sketch making jokes about the stupidity in the actual news. In the last part of the "Telejornal", another host dresses as a public figure or a steoritype of a Portuguese person, and serves as an interviewed character, as it happens in real news reports.

Rumor: It had been rumored that Gato Fedorento was to terminate this weekly sketch because it was a too violent satire of a real news report, but this was fake, since the "Telejornal" was still broadcasting.

=== Tesourinhos Deprimentes (Depressing Treasuries) ===
This weekly sketch has been from the beginning of Season I the favorite part of the show by most of the audience. In the pilot episodes of Diz que é uma Espécie de Magazine Gato Fedorento would gasp ridiculously and be surprised by a large wooden chest planted unexpectedly beneath their seats; inside there was a large number of tapes that they pretended to play in the moment. This, however, ended in midst of the first season, when the hosts simply presented the sketch out loud. The objective of Tesourinhos Deprimentes was to show the very worst of RTP programming, featuring forgotten series, reports, and shows that were plain ridiculous. The segment wasn't written by the group.

There has been one Treasury every episode, that has revealed hilarious situations that occurred from the Assembleia da República to the most seen shows in the history of RTP.

=== Momento Musical! (Musical Moment!) ===
This was the usual closure of the program, that brings to the show known musicians to make fun of their own (or authored by others) songs, that are usually requested by the hosts.

Many famous Portuguese singers has stepped the stage of Diz que é uma Espécie de Magazine, and among the most memorable ones are goth metal band Moonspell singing the theme from Noddy, famous Portuguese rock band Xutos & Pontapés playing the show's own theme, recording artist André Sardet turning A Minha Sogra é Um Boi by Mata-Ratos (Translates to "My Mother-in-Law is a Bull"; famous comedy punk song) into an acoustic ballad, and even like an amateur rugby team singing a popular children medley.
