= Polina Klimovitskaya =

Dr. Polina Klimovitskaya is a Russian director, Master Acting teacher, and actress. She is the founder of Terra Incognita Theater and has taught acting at Yale University, New York University, and Michael Howard Studios in New York City, among other institutions.

== Education ==
Klimovitskaya holds a Master of Fine Arts in Directing from State Theater University, Moscow, Russia and a PhD from Yale University.

== Actor ==
Klimovitskaya began her career in the 1960s as an actress in Moscow, studying acting with disciples of Constantin Stanislavski and Yevgeny Vakhtangov. In the United States, she performed at Yale Repertory Theater under the direction of Andrzej Wajda in White Marriage (1977) and played "Mama" in the Academy Award winning film, Molly's Pilgrim (1985).

== Director ==
Klimovitskaya studied directing with the last assistant of the Russian/Soviet director, Vsevolod Meyerhold. Since coming to the United States in the 1970s, she has directed dozens of productions in Europe and in the USA. Among her works, Klimovitskaya directed at the Kennedy Center, and as an artist-in-residence at Mabou Mines, for whom she also wrote the story on which Lee Breuer based his production Red Beads.

She is the Founding Artistic Director of Terra Incognita Theater, a not-for-profit theater company, in residence at CAVE in Brooklyn since 2009. She created the group as Atelier 7 in 1981, producing Noël Coward’s Blithe Spirit. In a review of the company’s second production, at a Mabou Mines festival, Dan Isaac wrote in Other Stages, “Watching Pandora’s Box, one sensed the beginning of experimental work that will continue and grow more into terra incognita.” The company adopted the mantle, and in the following years Terra Incognita produced several shows, including Ida at the Window, winner at BACA Downtown. When Klimovitskaya moved to Portugal in 1990, the company went into hibernation.

After living and working for a decade in Portugal, Klimovitskaya returned to the USA and revived the company. Since then, Terra Incognita produced its Ophelia Tapestry at WAX and Construction Company in 2004; Manhattan Theatre Source hosted a workshop of Terra’s interpretation of Shelagh Delaney’s A Taste of Honey in 2006; a workshop of Pebble-and-Cart Cycle: one-line tragedies, Parts I and II performed at Dixon Place in 2008; and limited-engagement runs of Pebble-and-Cart Cycle: one-line tragedies, Parts I-III ran at the new Dixon Place and at the Capital Fringe Festival in Washington, D.C., in 2009. The company’s installation-performance piece Hair of Sand appeared first in 2009 at both Dixon Place and through the chashama Windows Program, supported by a grant from the Lower Manhattan Cultural Council.

Also through Terra Incognita, Klimovitskaya created and presented new works in subsequent years, including Speech-less at both CAVE and WAXworks, I Take Good Care of My Corpse at SOAK NY Festival at CAVE, and the public-space performance series Moving Landscape, which appeared in various public iterations throughout New York City throughout 2011 and 2012, including at the FIGMENT Festival.

== Teacher ==
As of 2002 she taught acting in New York City at Michael Howard Studios and Hunter College, and in New Haven, Connecticut at Yale University, where she received a Roothbert Fund Award for Innovative Teaching. Over 30 years, Klimovitskaya developed a unique acting approach known as "Kinetic Mind Practice" which she has applied at institutions such as New York University, Brooklyn College, Stella Adler Studio, and the National Shakespeare Conservatory. She has taught many workshops internationally, including in Russia, Poland, Portugal, and France, as well as throughout the United States of America.

Klimovitskaya has trained thousands of actors, including notables such as Michael Cerveris, David Hyde Pierce, Kerry Washington, and Zoe Kazan.

== Personal life ==
Klimovitskaya has one son with Lee Breuer: musician/composer Alex Klimovitsky, formerly lead singer and guitarist of the rock band Three and a Quarter and currently drummer and lead singer of the rock duo Youthless.
