= O Tal Canal =

Portuguese comedy television series

- Genre: Sketch comedy
- Directed by: Nuno Teixeira
- Starring: Herman José; Vítor de Sousa; Helena Isabel; Lídia Franco; Manuel Cavaco; Margarida Carpinteiro; Natália de Sousa
- Country of origin: Portugal
- Original language: Portuguese
- No. of seasons: 1
- No. of episodes: 12

Production
- Production location: Lisbon
- Production company: RTP

Original release
- Network: RTP1
- Release: 22 October 1983 – 7 January 1984

O Tal Canal (That Channel) was a Portuguese comedy television series with elements of a variety show, broadcast by RTP1 between 22 October 1983 and 7 January 1984. Created by Herman José and with the additional participation of Vítor de Sousa, Helena Isabel, Lídia Franco, Manuel Cavaco, Margarida Carpinteiro and Natália de Sousa, the series is centered around the titular O Tal Canal, a fictional private channel owned by Oliveira Casca.

== Premise and segments ==
The series came at a time when Portugal only had two television channels, owned by the same state company. O Tal Canal, seen as an alternative to the two channels, caricatured several facets of RTP at the time, under the guise of a fictional third channel, owned by businessman Oliveira Casca (Herman José). In addition to the comedy segments, it also included musical acts inside its in-universe variety show.

The sketches were:

- Informação 3: newscast presented by Carlos Filinto Botelho (caricature of Carlos Pinto Coelho), with the participation of Manuel Freio, Beleza de Sousa and Flávio Portugal.
- Programa Infantil: children's program created by Palmira Pires. Aside from its educational value, it also raised awareness of problems related to child development, using the behavior of character Nelito as a plot device.
- Cozinho para o Povo: cooking show presented by Filipa Vasconcelos (caricature of Filipa Vacondeus), whose recipes often included heavy doses of paprika.
- O Esférico Rolando Sobre a Erva: sports program produced from O Tal Canal's Porto production center, presented by José Esteves. It also featured guests from the Portuguese football scene.
- Tempo dos Mais Velhos: a program for elderly viewers, featuring gymnastics for the intended target audience.
- Viva a Coltura: cultural program presented by Oliveira Casca.
- Estamos Nesta: pop music program aimed at the youth.
- Jaquina, Jaquina, Jaquina: fashion magazine, where stylist Jaquina presented the Moda Crise 84 collection. In the context of the economic crisis that Portugal was facing at the time, the models presented clothes made out of recycled materials, such as newspapers or trash bags.
- O Diário de Marilu: Portuguese period telenovela, based on an original text from the fictional author Dorothy Perkins. Marilu (Herman José) is an innocent young woman who works as a housemaid at the house of Condensa da França (Lídia Franco). Marilu gains a love relation with John Smith (Vítor de Sousa), but social differences make the relationship impossible. The only one who understands Marilu is Cilinha (Helena Isabel), daughter of Condensa, who falls in love with gardener Inácio (Manuel Cavaco). Graciete (Natália de Sousa), Condensa's nurse, is an undercover agent who tries to take hold of Marilu's diary to give it to her lover, Fabricius (Herman José). Marilu's diary contains a horrible secret, which Fabricius wants to use at his own benefit.
- The Tony Silva's Super All Star Show: musical variety show, similar to programs that aired in the period, presented by Tony Silva (Herman José, character created in 1981 for O Passeio dos Alegres) with a guest star from the Portuguese music scene.
- O Tal Rural: farming program, similar to TV Rural.
- Tal & Escola: educational program teaching foreign languages to viewers. In one episode, actress Glória de Matos appears repeating the phrases said by the teacher, alongside the remaining actors of the show (as class mates).
- Página 3: interview program presented by architect José Bastos.
- Fim de Programa: appears in the final episode of the series, and was based on Carlos Pinto Coelho's Fim de Semana, which aired on weekends at the time. Various public figures give their opinion on the channel.

In addition to the regular segments, there were also commercials and a continuity announcer.

== Impact ==
Herman José made a one-off reunion for Cá por Casa in February 2017.

For the fortieth anniversary of the series, a celebratory program aired on RTP1 where Herman José looked back at the program and its creation.
