= Horizontes da Memória =

- Genre: Historical documentary
- Created by: José Hermano Saraiva
- Presented by: José Hermano Saraiva

Production
- Running time: 30 minutes

Original release
- Network: RTP

Horizontes da Memória (lit. Horizons of Memory) was a Portuguese historical documentary television series about the History of Portugal. As of 2023, it airs on RTP Memória.
