= Gato Fedorento =

Portuguese comedy group

- Notable work: O Perfeito Anormal; Gato Fedorento; Diz que é uma Espécie de Magazine; Gato Fedorento Esmiúça Os Sufrágios

Comedy career
- Years active: 2002–2009
- Medium: Television; Internet; Radio; Theatre
- Genres: Surreal comedy Stand-up; Sketch comedy Satire; Political satire
- Members: José Diogo Quintela; Miguel Góis; Ricardo Araújo Pereira; Tiago Dores

Gato Fedorento (pronounced [ˈɡatu fɨðuˈɾẽtu]; "Smelly Cat") is a Portuguese surreal comedy group, known for their subjective and absurd satire centering both on the Portuguese language and the Portuguese social reality. The group is composed of the four comedians José Diogo Quintela, Miguel Góis, Ricardo Araújo Pereira and Tiago Dores. They started their comedy careers as screenwriters, writing for other comedians, which later developed into their own television shows, radio programs, a talk show and several advertising campaigns. They have been credited with introducing and popularizing the surreal humour genre in Portugal and are one of the most important influences in the modern Portuguese comedy. Their humour is heavily influenced by Monty Python.

Gato Fedorento, their homonym television show, ran for nine seasons. In its original unique surreal humour, the group is known for overusing Portuguese idioms, especially in indirect speech, within current discourse on their sketches, turning apparently objective quotidian situations into subjective and often illogical ones. Season names during the first four seasons were meant to satirically represent typical Portuguese surnames and are used as a last name for every single character in every episode of the show within their respective seasons. They also use satirical fictional city names that sound like realistic traditional Portuguese villages, often by including altered forms of Portuguese slang, in the same fashion as in the case of the surnames that give the name to the different seasons.

Currently, they have an exclusivity advertisement agreement with Portugal Telecom of unspecified duration, that spans multiple mediums, being the brand ambassadors.

== History ==
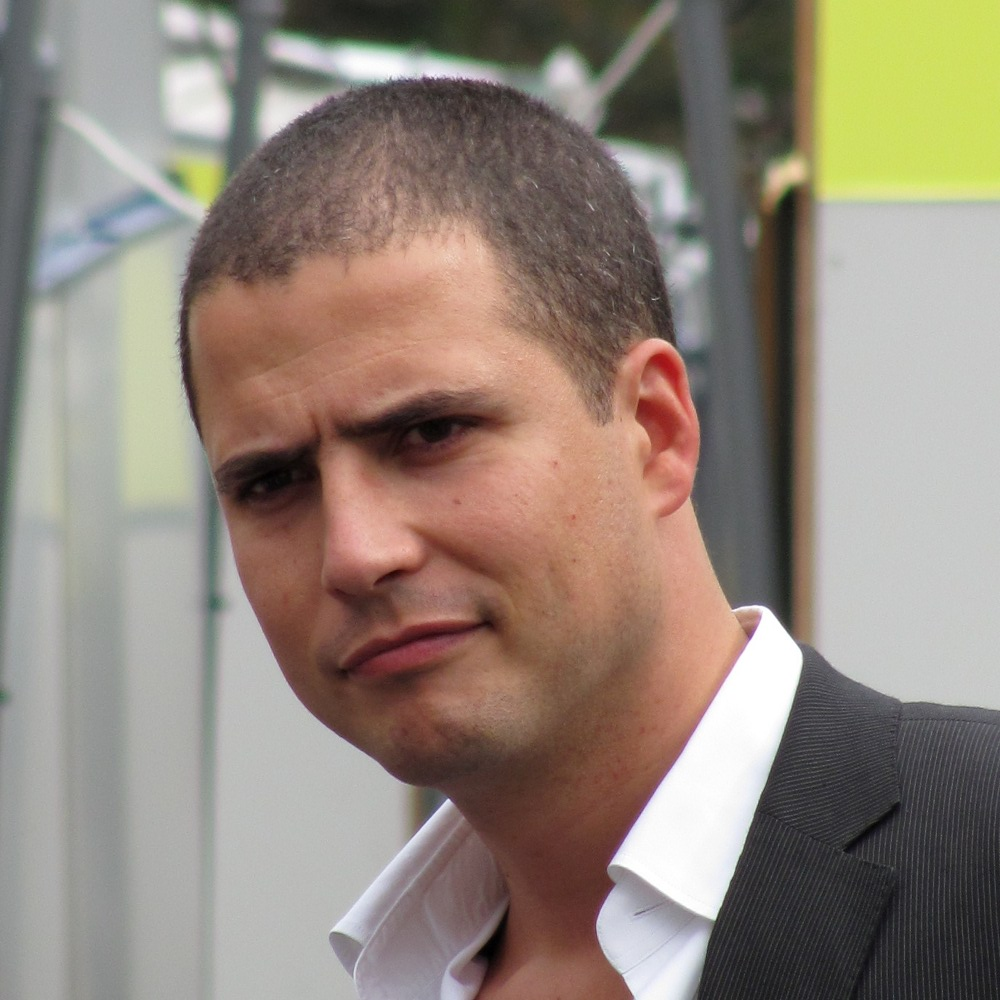
Ricardo Araujo Pereira

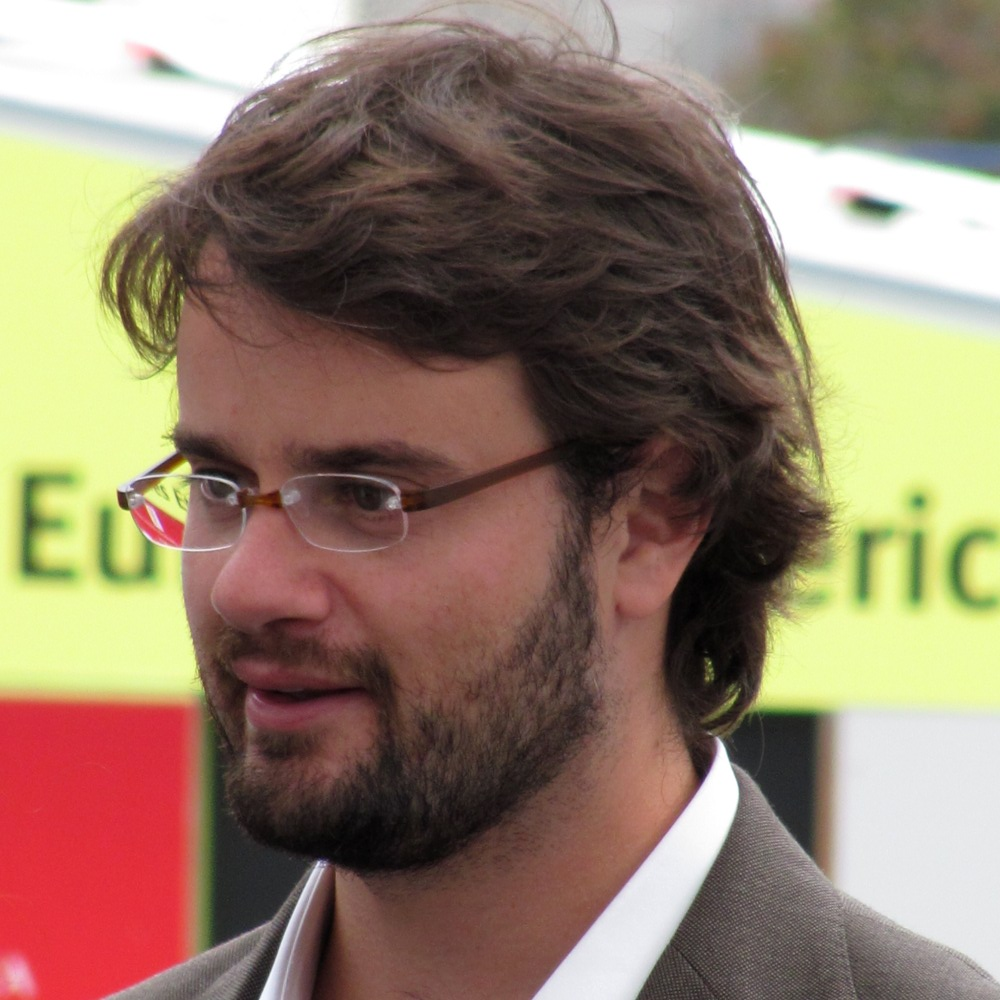
José Diogo Quintela

The four screenwriters worked at the Portuguese production company Produções Fictícias, where they worked with some of the big names in the Portuguese comedy, like Herman José and Maria Rueff. In 2002, they started delivering their own material in the show O Perfeito Anormal (The Perfect Dork) on SIC Radical. Their success in that role led the then director of SIC Radical, Francisco Penim, to invite them to create their own show.

Meanwhile, in 2003, they created an homonym weblog where they regularly presented some of their material. When they were deciding how to name the group, they chose it after the song "Smelly Cat", from the soundtrack of Friends, which translates as "Gato Fedorento" in Portuguese. In the same year, Gato Fedorento, their homonym television show, premiered on SIC Radical, running for three seasons, the Fonseca Series, the Meireles Series and the Barbosa Series (from 2 May 2005). This last season was known for having a decline in quality, as well as repeating the same formula for certain sketches in several successive episodes.

The series made it to terrestrial television in July 2005, when the first season was broadcast on SIC. In December 2005, the group signed a contract with RTP for two years.

In 2006, after moving their show to RTP1, the fourth season, Lopes da Silva, premiered with moderate success. As stipulated in the contract (26 episodes during 2006), the first 13 episodes (the fourth season) followed the traditional sketch format from the previous seasons. The fifth season, titled Diz que é uma Espécie de Magazine (lit. It's a sort of talk show), a talk show with live audience, brought a significant change in the show's format, with sketches now spoofing current events and news, instead of relying on subjective and surreal gags. In this new format, they also do impressions of Portuguese politicians and celebrities, mostly played by Ricardo Araújo Pereira, with the most spoofed being José Sócrates, Valentim Loureiro, Marcelo Rebelo de Sousa and Paulo Bento. The sixth and seventh seasons were the last television shows made by Gato Fedorento on RTP1.

After returning to SIC in 2008, now on the flagship channel, the group kept the new format and made their eighth season, Zé Carlos. Their ninth and last season, Gato Fedorento Esmiúça Os Sufrágios, ran for 30 episodes, broadcast live from Monday to Friday, covering the 2009 Portuguese elections, featuring guests from the world of politics. The group has released a DVD with the Fonseca season and performed live all over Portugal, being a huge success and breaking all DVD sale records in the country. In late 2005, they released another DVD with the Meireles season. The first three seasons still aired on SIC Radical, as reruns.

With the end of Gato Fedorento Esmiúça os Sufrágios in October 2009, the group announced that they would no longer make daily news-based formats.

Gato Fedorento were Portugal Telecom's brand ambassadors from 2006 to 2016. They have an exclusivity advertisement agreement of unspecified duration, that spans multiple mediums, including TV, radio, press, Internet and billboards, featuring a sketch-like comedy similar to their television programs.

== See also ==
- Smelly Cat
- Monty Python
