= Radiotelevisão Comercial =

Defunct organisation of RTP responsible for advertising and merchandising

Radiotelevisão Comercial (RTC) was the commercial arm of Rádio e Televisão de Portugal (RTP), active from 1982 to 2002. Its primary activity was the exploitation of commercial advertising slots on RTP's two channels, but was also responsible for sales of merchandise from its programs. It shut down as part of a corporate restructuring.

== History ==
RTP signed a commercial contract with Movierecord Portuguesa SARL, subsidiary of the Spanish company of the same name, in September 1962. After the return to democracy in 1975, RTP was nationalized and Movierecord's role in RTP's advertising sales was limited from January 1976, becoming a mere service provider. Per RTP's 1977 Annual Report, the company's financial situation was now in the red (RTP was Movierecord Portuguesa's only creditor and user), and had to be replaced by a new company using much of its existing infrastructure. The name Radiotelevisão Comercial was already defined, but the company was far from becoming a reality yet.

RTC was definitively formed on 4 November 1982. Its capital was divided between the two largest creditors of the former advertising concessionaire, RTP (with 95%) and Instituto Português de Cinema (5%). RTC unveiled a new logo in 1989, turning the extant diamond logo into a stylized eye, which blinked in its break bumpers. A press campaign showing the new RTC, "which you don't see but contributes to economic growth", appeared in conjunction.

In 2002, the company was accused of negligence and bad management referring to its previous managing council, in 2000, which was presided by Carlos Veloso in the referred period. In mid-2000, Veloso cut ties with the company that provided the software needed for the advertisements to air, but due to the lack of arrival of the new software that was promised, its commercials were inserted manually again. Because of the changes in software, RTC did not provide 700 thousand contos to clients between July and December 2000 alone. In August 2002, RTP's president, Almerindo Marques, received letters from RTC staff, raising awareness of the irregularities.

As part of a wider restructuring of the corporation, RTP announced the liquidation of RTC in July 2002, with RTP becoming directly responsible for advertising sales. The closure coincided with other cuts and sales RTP had at the time. At the end of December, the company was officially liquidated and its staff of 80 gradually lost their jobs. Until the creation of RTP's in-house ad sales unit, an external company, in charge of the software, handled advertising on RTP.
