= List of docufiction films =

Docufiction is a documentary film mixed with fictional elements. This is a list of feature-length docufiction films ordered chronologically.

Please search for references inside each article:

- 1926: Moana by Robert Flaherty, USA
- 1930: Maria do Mar by Leitão de Barros, Portugal
- 1931: Tabu by Robert Flaherty and F. W. Murnau, USA
- 1932: L'or des mers by Jean Epstein, France
- 1934: Man of Aran by Robert Flaherty, UK
- 1945: Ala-Arriba! by Leitão de Barros, Portugal
- 1948: La Terra Trema by Luchino Visconti, Italy
- 1948: Louisiana Story by Robert Flaherty, USA
- 1952: Children of Hiroshima by Kaneto Shindo, Japan
- 1956: On the Bowery by Lionel Rogosin, USA
- 1958: Moi, un noir (Me, A Black Man) by Jean Rouch, France
- 1958/59 Indie Matra Bhumi (The Motherland) by Roberto Rossellini, Italy
- 1959: Come Back, Africa by Lionel Rogosin, USA
- 1961: La pyramide humaine (The Human Pyramid) by Jean Rouch, France
- 1962: Rite of Spring by Manoel de Oliveira, Portugal
- 1963: Pour la suite du monde (Of Whales, the Moon and Men) by Pierre Perrault and Michel Brault, Canada
- 1964: Belarmino by Fernando Lopes, Portugal
- 1967: David Holzman's Diary by Jim McBride, USA
- 1971: Petit à petit (Little by Little) by Jean Rouch, France
- 1973: Trevico-Torino (viaggio nel Fiat-Nam) by Ettore Scola, Italy
- 1974: Orders (Les Ordres), by Michel Brault, Canada
- 1974: Cocorico! Monsieur Poulet by Jean Rouch, France
- 1976: People from Praia da Vieira by António Campos, Portugal
- 1976: To Fly! by Greg MacGillivray and Jim Freeman (USA)
- 1976: Trás-os-Montes by Antonio Reis and Margarida Cordeiro, Portugal
- 1981: Transes (fr) by Ahmed El Maânouni, Morocco
- 1982: Ana by António Reis and Margarida Cordeiro, Portugal
- 1982: After the Axe by Sturla Gunnarsson, Canada
- 1984: The Masculine Mystique by Giles Walker and John N. Smith (Canada)
- 1985: 90 Days by Giles Walker (Canada)
- 1986: Sitting in Limbo by John N. Smith (Canada)
- 1987: The Last Straw by Giles Walker (Canada)
- 1987: Train of Dreams by John N. Smith (Canada)
- 1988: Mortu Nega (Death denied) by Flora Gomes, Guiné-Bissau
- 1989: Welcome to Canada by John N. Smith (Canada)
- 1990: The Company of Strangers, by Cynthia Scott, Canada
- 1990: Close-Up by Abbas Kiarostami, Iran
- 1991: Zombie and the Ghost Train by Mika Kaurismäki, Finland
- 1991: And Life Goes On by Abbas Kiarostami, Iran
- 1998: Whoever Dies, Dies in Pain (Quiconque meurt, meurt à douleur) by Robert Morin, Canada
- 2000: In Vanda's Room by Pedro Costa, Portugal
- 2001: Waking Life by Richard Linklater, United States
- 2002: City of God by Fernando Meirelles and Kátia Lund, Brazil
- 2002: Ten by Abbas Kiarostami, Iran
- 2005: Underexposure by Oday Rasheed, Iraq
- 2006: Colossal Youth by Pedro Costa, Portugal
- 2006: Angadi Theru by Vasantha Balan, India
- 2008: Our Beloved Month of August by Miguel Gomes, Portugal
- 2009: The Mouth of the Wolf by Pietro Marcello, Italy
- 2009: The Age of Stupid by Franny Armstrong (UK)
- 2013: Closed Curtain by Jafar Panahi and Kambuzia Partovi, Iran
- 2013: Interior. Leather Bar. by James Franco and Travis Mathews (USA)
- 2014. 20,000 Days on Earth by Iain Forsyth and Jane Pollard, United Kingdom
- 2015: Taxi by Jafar Panahi, France
- 2016: Your Name Here by B. P. Paquette, Canada
- 2016: Lightman by Kumar G. Venkatesh, India
- 2024: Stay Still by Joanna Lombardi, Peru
- 2024: Tumandok by Richard Jeroui Salvadico and Arlie Sweet Sumagaysay, Philippines
