= António Campos =

- Born: António Campos; 29 May 1922; Leiria, Portugal
- Died: 8 March 1999 (aged 76); Figueira da Foz, Portugal
- Years active: 1957–1993

António Campos (29 May 1922 – 8 March 1999) was one of the pioneer filmmakers of visual anthropology in Portugal. Mainly using pure documentary techniques, he shot ethnographic films and tried docufiction. As well as in fictional films, he used the methods of direct cinema to portrait the life of ancient human communities (ethnofiction) of his country.

He started making films at the beginning of the sixties, at the same time as John Marshall (EU) and Michel Brault (Canada). Without knowing much about Jean Rouch, he followed his steps in an original way.

== Biography ==
He integrated a troupe of theatre amateurs and worked at a state department office in Leiria. He got a subvention from the Calouste Gulbenkian Foundation in 1961, where he worked between 1970 and 1976, to study cinema in London. He took part in the 20th Century Film Festival, in Kracow, Poland. He was the delegate in Portugal for the International Federation of Art Film and a member of the International Union of Independent Filmmakers (UNICI).

He started making films as an amateur. He shot ethnographic films with 16 mm light cameras and with no scientific purposes, like some of his Portuguese fellows, such as António Reis, Ricardo Costa or Pedro Costa, this one using small mini dv cameras, some years later. After the Carnation Revolution, he directed some theatrical fictional features in 35 mm, all with a strong anthropologic content. He was one of the representatives of the Portuguese Cinema Novo (or Novo Cinema), inspired by the French New Wave.

His film Gente da Praia da Vieira (People of Praia da Vieira), 1976, is, together with Trás-os-Montes, by António Reis and Margarida Cordeiro, and with Mau Tempo, Marés e Mudança (Changing Tides), by Ricardo Costa, one of the first docufictions of Portuguese cinema. Shot on the same year, these films, in the same genre, are preceded by Acto da Primavera (Act of Spring), 1962, by Manoel de Oliveira, and Ala-Arriba!, 1948, by José Leitão de Barros, a contemporary to Robert Flaherty. These films may also be classified as ethnofictions.

== Filmography ==
Feature films

- 1971 – Vilarinho das Furnas
- 1974 – Falamos de Rio de Onor (We talk about Rio de Onor)
- 1975 – Gente da Praia da Vieira (People of Praia da Vieira)
- 1978 – Histórias Selvagens (Savage stories)
- 1992 – Terra Fria (Cold Land)

Short and middle-length films

- 1957 – O rio Liz
- 1958 – Um tesouro
- 1959 – O Senhor
- 1961 – A Almadraba Atuneira
- 1961 – Leiria 61
- 1962 – Debussy
- 1962 – Instrumentos musicais populares
- 1962 – Colóquio do Comité Internacional dos Museus de Instrumentos Musicais
- 1963 – Arte portuguesa contemporânea em Leiria
- 1964 – Arte portuguesa contemporânea em Évora
- 1964 – La fille mal gardée
- 1964 – Incêndio no auditório antigo da Fundação Caloute Gulbenkian
- 1964 – Instrumentos musicais portugueses II
- 1965 – 100 anos de pintura francesa
- 1965 – A invenção do amor
- 1965 – Ouros do Peru
- 1965 – Retratos das margens do rio Liz
- 1966 – Arte do índio brasileiro
- 1966 – Chagall – Breve a lua, lua cheia virá aparecer
- 1966 – Inauguração do hospital S. João de Deus – Montemor-o-Novo
- 1967 – Colagem
- 1967 – Construção do Centro de Biologia de Oeiras da Fundação Calouste Gulbenkian
- 1967 – Iniciação musical pelo método Orff
- 1968 – Art portugais à Paris
- 1968 – Arte portuguesa : do naturalismo aos nossos dias
- 1968 – Festa de Natal dos funcionários da Fundação Calouste Gulbenkian
- 1968 – O Principezinho
- 1962–1969 – Obras de construção da sede, do museu e do grande auditório da Fundação Calouste Gulbenkian
- 1970 – Raul Lino (not finished)
- 1971 – Arte francesa depois de 1951
- 1972 – Portugal e a Pérsia
- 1973 – Rodin
- 1974 – Museu Calouste Gulbenkian em Lisboa
- 1975 – A Festa
- 1976 – Paredes pintadas da revolução portuguesa
- 1976 – Protecção arquitetónica sob a coordenação do Conselho da Europa (inacabado)
- 1976 – 20º aniversário da morte de Calouste Gulgenkian
- 1976 – Ex-votos portugueses
- 1979 – Ti Miséria
- 1987 – À descoberta de Leiria
- 1993 – A Tremonha de Cristal (not finished)

== Bibliography ==
- (in Portuguese) António Campos – anthology about the films and life of António Campos (2000 – Cinemateca Portuguesa)
- (in Portuguese) O Cais do Olhar by José de Matos-Cruz, Portuguese Cinematheque, 1999

== See also ==
- Cinema of Portugal
- Cinema Novo
- Docufiction
- Visual anthropology
- Ethnographic film
- Salvage Ethnography
- Ethnofiction
- Direct cinema
- Cine season in Paris (Cinémathèque Française, 2002 – in French)
- List of directors associated with art film
