= Docufiction =

Film genre

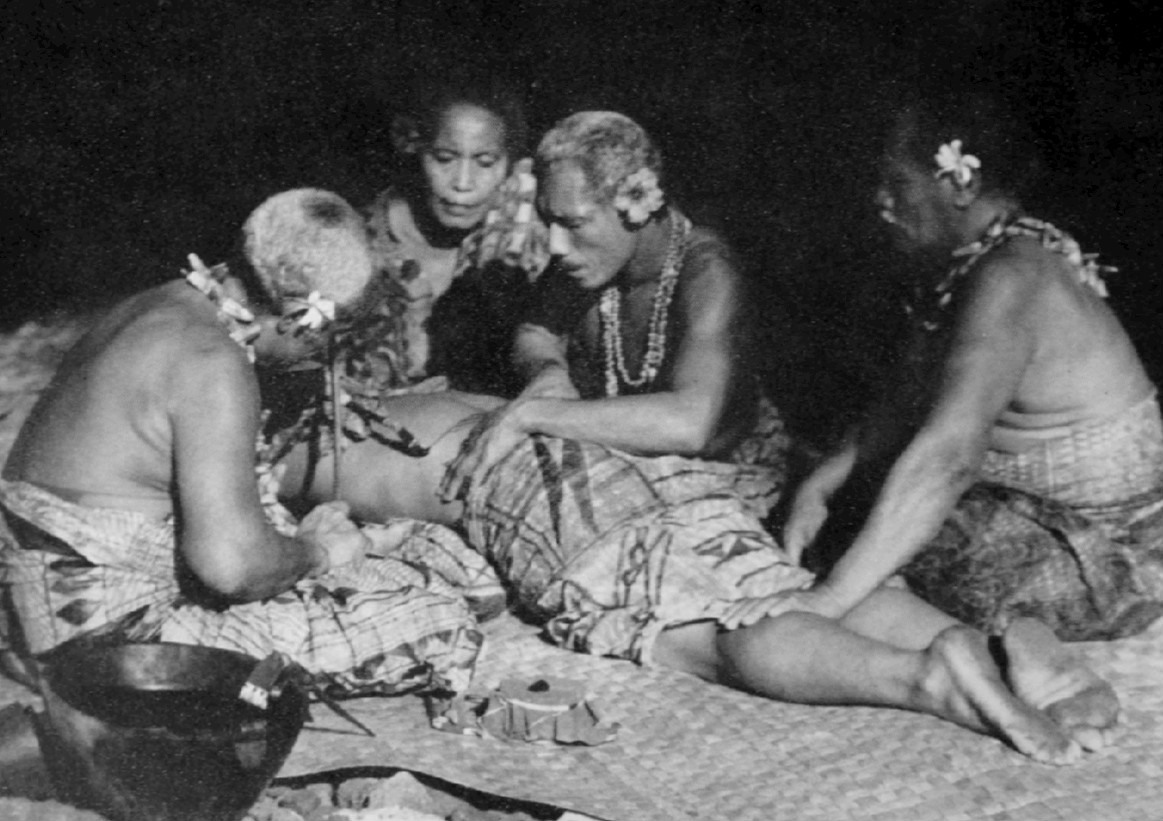
Moana, by Robert J. Flaherty, an early example of docufiction (1926)

Docufiction (or docu-fiction) is the cinematographic combination of documentary and fiction, this term often meaning narrative film. It is a film genre which attempts to capture reality such as it is (as direct cinema or cinéma vérité) and which simultaneously introduces unreal elements or fictional situations in narrative in order to strengthen the representation of reality using some kind of artistic expression.

More precisely, it is a documentary mixed with fictional elements, in real time, filmed when the events take place, and in which the main character or characters—often portrayed by non-professional or amateur actors—are essentially playing themselves, or slightly fictionalized versions of themselves, in a fictionalized scenario. In this sense, docufiction may overlap to an extent with some aspects of the mockumentary format, but the terms are not synonymous.

A film genre in expansion, it is adopted by a number of experimental filmmakers.

The neologism docufiction appeared at the beginning of the 21st century. It is now commonly used in several languages and widely accepted for classification by international film festivals.

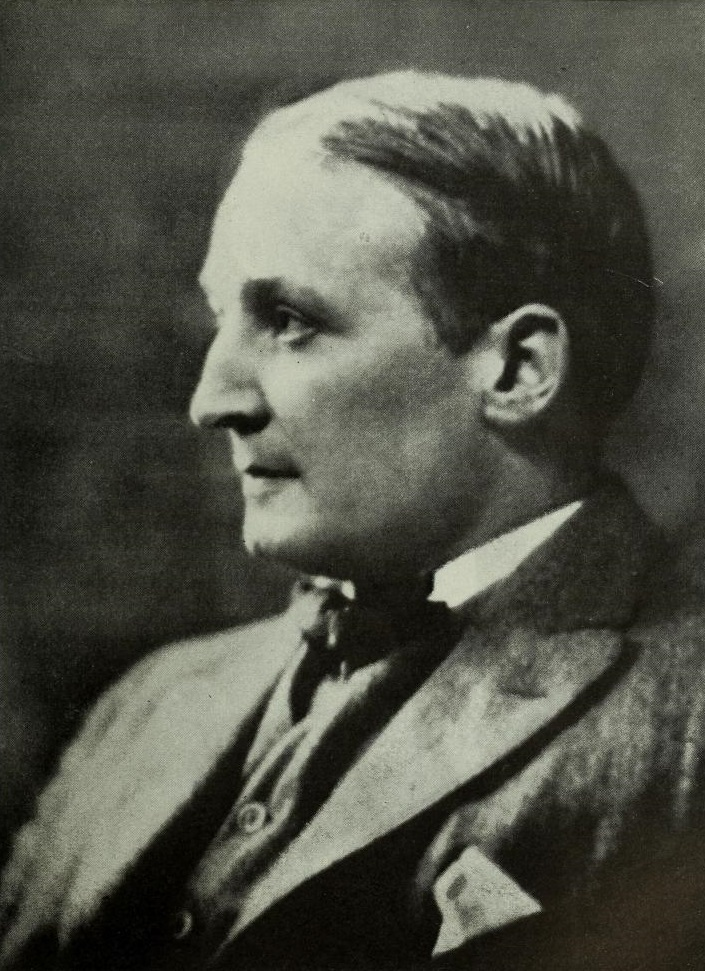
Robert J. Flaherty

== Origins ==
The term involves a way of making films already practiced by such authors as Robert J. Flaherty, one of the fathers of documentary, and Jean Rouch, later in the 20th century.

Being both fiction and documentary, docufiction is a hybrid genre, raising ethical problems concerning truth, since reality may be manipulated and confused with fiction (see Ethics at creative non-fiction).

In the domain of visual anthropology, the innovating role of Jean Rouch allows one to consider him as the father of a subgenre called ethnofiction. This term means: ethnographic documentary film with natives who play fictional roles. Making them play a role about themselves will help portray reality, which will be reinforced with imagery. A non-ethnographic documentary with fictional elements uses the same method and, for the same reasons, may be called docufiction.

== Docudrama and mockumentary ==
In contrast, docudrama is usually a dramatized recreation of factual events in form of a documentary, at a time subsequent to the "real" events it portrays. While docudrama can be confused with docufiction, "docudrama" refers specifically to film or other television recreations that dramatize certain events, often with actors.

A mockumentary is also a film or television show in which fictitious events are presented in documentary format, sometimes a recreation of factual events after they took place or a comment on current events, typically satirical, comedic or even dramatic. Whereas mockumentaries are usually fully scripted comedies or dramas that merely adopt some aspects of documentary format as a framing device, docufictions are usually not scripted, instead placing the participants in a fictionalized scenario while portraying their own genuine reactions and their own improvisational dialogue and character development.

== First docufictions by country ==
- 1926: United States – Moana by Robert J. Flaherty
- 1930: Portugal – Maria do Mar by José Leitão de Barros
- 1930: Germany - People on Sunday by Robert Siodmak and Edgar G. Ulmer
- 1932: France – L'Or des mers by Jean Epstein
- 1948: Italy – La Terra Trema by Luchino Visconti
- 1952: Japan – Children of Hiroshima by Kaneto Shindo
- 1963: Canada – Pour la suite du monde (Of Whales, the Moon and Men) by Pierre Perrault and Michel Brault
- 1981: Morocco – Trances by Ahmed El Maânouni
- 1988: Guiné-Bissau – Mortu Nega (Death denied) by Flora Gomes
- 1990: Iran – Close-up by Abbas Kiarostami
- 1991: Finland – Zombie and the Ghost Train by Mika Kaurismäki
- 2002: Brazil – City of God by Fernando Meirelles and Kátia Lund
- 2005: Iraq – Underexposure by Oday Rasheed

== Other notable examples ==
- 1927: Chang: A Drama of the Wilderness by Merian C. Cooper and Ernest B. Schoedsack (US)
- 1931: Tabu by Robert Flaherty and F.W. Murnau (US)
- 1934: Man of Aran by Robert Flaherty (US)
- 1942: Ala-Arriba! by Leitão de Barros (Portugal)
- 1948: Louisiana Story by Robert Flaherty (US)
- 1956: On the Bowery by Lionel Rogosin (US)
- 1958: Walt Disney's White Wilderness by James Algar (US)
- 1958: Moi, un noir (Me, A Black Man) by Jean Rouch (France)
- 1959: India Matri Bhumi (The Motherland) by Roberto Rossellini, released 2007 (Italy)
- 1959: Come Back, Africa by Lionel Rogosin (US)
- 1961: La pyramide humaine by Jean Rouch (The Human Pyramid) (France)
- 1962: Rite of Spring by Manoel de Oliveira (Portugal)
- 1964: Belarmino by Fernando Lopes (Portugal)
- 1967: David Holzman's Diary by Jim McBride (US)
- 1970: The Clowns by Federico Fellini (Italy)
- 1973: Trevico-Torino (viaggio nel Fiat-Nam) by Ettore Scola (Italy)
- 1974: Orders (Les Ordres), by Michel Brault (Canada)
- 1974: Montreal Main, by Frank Vitale (Canada)
- 1976: Trás-os-Montes (Portugal)
- 1982: Ana by António Reis and Margarida Cordeiro (Portugal)
- 1982: After the Axe, by Sturla Gunnarsson (Canada)
- 1984: The Masculine Mystique by Giles Walker and John N. Smith (Canada)
- 1985: 90 Days by Giles Walker (Canada)
- 1986: Sitting in Limbo by John N. Smith (Canada)
- 1987: The Last Straw by Giles Walker (Canada)
- 1987: Train of Dreams by John N. Smith (Canada)
- 1989: Welcome to Canada by John N. Smith (Canada)
- 1990: The Company of Strangers by Cynthia Scott (Canada)
- 1991: And Life Goes On by Abbas Kiarostami (Iran)
- 2000: In Vanda's Room by Pedro Costa (Portugal)
- 2001: Tutto in un Giorno by Giorgio J. Squarcia (Italy)."
- 2002: Ten by Abbas Kiarostami (Iran)
- 2006: Colossal Youth by Pedro Costa (Portugal)
- 2007: Criminals Gone Wild by Ousala Aleem (US)
- 2008: Our Beloved Month of August by Miguel Gomes (Portugal)
- 2009: Carcasses by Denis Côté (Canada)
- 2009: The Mouth of the Wolf by Pietro Marcello (Italy)
- 2013: Closed Curtain by Jafar Panahi and Kambuzia Partovi (Iran)
- 2015: Taxi by Jafar Panahi (Iran)
- 2016: Tuktuq by Robin Aubert (Canada)
- 2018: Mad Dog Labine by Jonathan Beaulieu-Cyr and Renaud Lessard (Canada)
- 2019: Rolling Thunder Revue by Martin Scorsese (US)
- 2025: The Voice of Hind Rajab by Kaouther Ben Hania (Tunisia)

== See also ==
- Ethnofiction
- Pseudo-documentary – a fake documentary, often presented as real
- Scripted reality – a subgenre of reality television, in which parts of the contents are fictional and scripted
- Visual anthropology

== Sources and bibliography ==
=== Theses ===
- (In English) Docufiction in the Digital Age – thesis by Tay Huizhen, National University of Singapore
- (In English) The Zulu Mask: The Role of Creative Imagination in Documentary Film – thesis by Clifford Derrick, Faculty of Arts, University of the Witwatersrand, Johannesburg
- (In English) Docudrama: the real (his)tory—thesis by Çiçek Coşkun (New York University School of Education)
- (In English) Issues in contemporary documentary by Jane Chapman at Google Books (pp. 1–34)

=== Articles and essays ===
- (In English) Shaping the Real: Directorial imagination and the visualisation of evidence in the hybrid documentary – article by Janet Merewether at Scan, Media Department at Macquarie University, Sydney
- (In English) Docufiction: Where Art and Life Merge and Diverge– Article by Julie Drizin at Makers Quest 2.0
- (In English) New Media Documentary – Paper by Gunthar Hartwig
- (In English) Docudrama: the real (his)tory
- (In English) Panel: At The Edge of Truth: Hybrid Documentaries at Vox Talk magazine
- (In English) The dual phase oscillation hypothesis and the neuropsychology of docu-fiction film – article by Dyutiman Mukhopadhyay, Consciousness, Literature and the Arts, vol. 16, no. 1, April 2015
- (In English) A creative treatment of actuality – paper by Peter Biesterfeld at Videomaker, August 7, 2015
- (In English) The art paradox – article by Bert Oliver at Thought Leader, September 17, 2012
- (In French) Le documentaire historique au péril du « docufiction – thesis by François Garçon (abstract in English and French)
- (In French) 3 questions à…Isabelle Veyrat-Masson – interview (Le Journal du CNRS)
- (In French) Peter Watkins, un cinéaste maudit article at Critikat
- (In Italian) Un genere cinematografico: la docu-fiction. Il caso di 150 ore a Pavia by Laura Marchesi (thesis – abstract)

=== Cited works ===
- (In English) Paget, Derek (1998). No Other Way to Tell It. Dramadoc/docudrama on television. Manchester University Press. ISBN 978-0-7190-4533-2.
- (In English) Rosenthal, Alan (1999). Why Docudrama?: Fact-Fiction on Film and TV. Carbondale & Edwardsville: Southern Illinois Press. ISBN 978-0-8093-2186-5.
- (In English) Lipkin, Steven N., ed. (2002). Real Emotional Logic. Film and Television Docudrama as Persuasive Practice. Carbondale: Southern Illinois Press. ISBN 978-0-8093-2409-5.
