= Ana (1982 film) =

- Directed by: António Reis; Margarida Cordeiro
- Screenplay by: António Reis; Margarida Cordeiro
- Produced by: António Reis; Margarida Cordeiro; Paulo Branco
- Starring: Ana Maria Martins Guerra; Manuel Ramalho Eanes; Octávio Lixa Filgueiras
- Cinematography: Acácio de Almeida
- Edited by: António Reis; Margarida Cordeiro
- Production company: Centro Português de Cinema (CPC)
- Release date: 15 September 1982
- Running time: 114 minutes
- Country: Portugal
- Language: Portuguese

Ana is a 1982 Portuguese independent docufictional and ethnofictional feature film, written, directed and edited by António Reis and Margarida Cordeiro. It was filmed in Trás-os-Montes like António Reis' previous film, Trás-os-Montes. The film was selected as the Portuguese entry for the Best Foreign Language Film at the 58th Academy Awards, but was not accepted as a nominee.

== Reception ==
Ana was present at film festivals like the Venice Film Festival, the Berlin Film Festival, Rotterdam Film Festival, Hong Kong International Film Festival or the São Paulo International Film Festival.

The film was in exhibition in Paris for three months.

In 2011, Ana was screened at the Jeonju International Film Festival, marking the beginning of the international rediscover of the work of António Reis and Margarida Cordeiro. In 2012, the film was screened in the United States at the Harvard Film Archive, the Anthology Film Archives, at the UCLA Film and Television Archives and at the Pacific Film Archive as part of The School of Reis program.

== See also ==
- Docufiction
- List of docufiction films
- List of submissions to the 58th Academy Awards for Best Foreign Language Film
- List of Portuguese submissions for the Academy Award for Best Foreign Language Film
