= The Human Pyramid =

The Human Pyramid may refer to:

- The Human Pyramid (1899 film), by Georges Méliès
- The Human Pyramid (1961 film), by Jean Rouch
