= Adrian Balseca =

Ecuadorian artist

Adrián Balseca Carrillo (1989) is an Ecuadorian research-based artist and filmmaker who works between Argentina and Ecuador.

His work focuses on specific environmental issues across various territories, employing a range of media including installation, film, photography, and archival materials. By navigating the space between ethnofiction and documentary, he explores economic agendas related to extractivism. Through his research process, Balseca uncovers hidden histories intertwined with the dynamics of late capitalism, while simultaneously dismantling colonial symbols and raising a call for the restoration and healing of nature.

His work has garnered several awards and recognitions, including the Honorable Mention at the 14th Cuenca Biennial: Living Structures. Art as a Plural Experience (Cuenca, 2018); the Han Nefkens Foundation Video Art Production Award from Centro de Arte Contemporáneo Quito (Quito, 2018); 2015 CIFO Grants & Commissions Program (Miami, 2015); and the Paris Award at the 12th Cuenca Biennial: Leaving to Return (Cuenca, 2014).

== Life and career ==
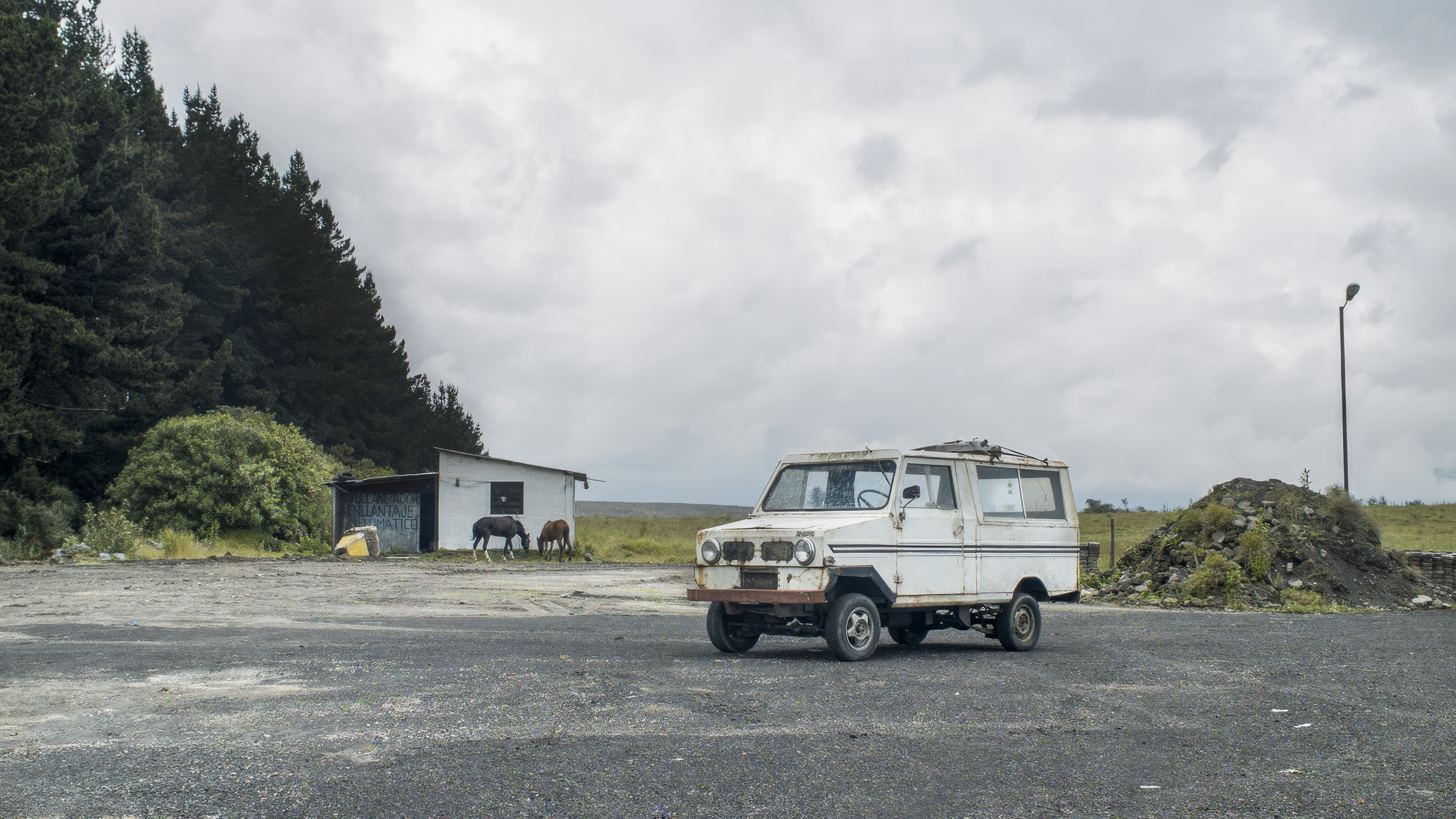
Medio Camino, digital video 4K, 15 '41 " (loop), 2014. Project commissioned for 12th Cuenca Biennial: Leaving to Return, 2014.

He is a self-taught artist who has collaborated with several art collectives such as Tranvía Cero (2006–2009) and is a former member of La Selecta - Cooperativa Cultural. Both are based in Quito.

Recent exhibitions include: Nyctalopia (Void Art Centre, Derry, 2023); In Praise of Darkness, 55th Visions Du Réel International Film Festival (Nyon, 2024); Critical Landscapes (MCA Denver, Denver, 2023); ROUTING RUBBER (Canal Projects, New York, 2024); The genetically altered seed breaks the rhythm of an earthly music-Encounters Over Several Plants (TATE Modern, London, 2022); Who Tells a Tale Adds a Tail (Denver Art Museum, Denver, 2022); Rethinking Nature (MADRE Museum, Naples, 2021); 34th São Paulo Biennial: Faz escuro mas eu canto (Ciccillo Matarazzo Pavilion, São Paulo, 2021); Cosmopolis #2: rethinking the human (Centre Pompidou, Paris, 2019), among others.

== Solo shows ==
- Nyctalopia (2024)
- ROUTING RUBBER (2024)
- PLANTASIA OIL Co. (2021)
- The Unbalanced Land (2019)
- Estela blanca (2019)
- Horamen (2017)
- The Skin of Labour (2016)
- Ornato y delito (2010)
- Si hay gas (2006)
