= Maria Eugénia Cunhal =

Portuguese writer, feminist and communist

- Born: Maria Eugénia Barreirinhas Cunhal; 17 January 1927; Lisbon, Portugal
- Died: 10 December 2015 (aged 88); Lisbon
- Other name: Maria Eugénia Barreirinhas Cunhal Medina
- Occupations: Journalist, writer
- Relatives: Álvaro Cunhal (brother)

Maria Eugénia Barreirinhas Cunhal Medina (1927 – 2015) was a Portuguese journalist, poet, writer, teacher and translator who also used the pseudonym Maria André. A communist activist, she was the sister of the General Secretary of the Portuguese Communist Party (PCP), Álvaro Cunhal.

== Early life ==
Cunhal was born in the Portuguese capital of Lisbon on 17 January 1927, daughter of Mercedes Simões Ferreira Barreirinhas and Avelino Henriques da Costa Cunhal, who came from Coimbra. Her father was a lawyer and her mother a devout Catholic. She was the youngest of the couple's four children, her brother Álvaro Cunhal being 14 years older than she. Her sister died in 1921 before she was born, and her elder brother died when she was six years old.

From an early age, Cunhal was meeting notable figures of Portuguese literature, such as the poet José Gomes Ferreira and the neorealist writers, Alves Redol and Soeiro Pereira Gomes, who frequented her parents' house on Avenidas Novas, in Lisbon. All three, together with her father, were members of the PCP. She started primary school at the school where her father taught, but completed it at home after her father was dismissed following the first arrest of Álvaro Cunhal, in 1937. She visited her brother at the Aljube prison at the age of nine. She continued her studies at the Lycée français Charles Lepierre in Lisbon. She did not go to university but began to work as a translator, including for television subtitles. She would later be the first translator of Chekhov's stories into Portuguese. Her first poems were published under the pseudonym of Maria André in the magazine Vértice.

== Later life ==
Cunhal joined the PCP and remained a member until her death, being in the Intellectual, Arts and Letters sector of the Lisbon regional organization of the party. At the same time as her father was arrested on 2 February 1945, she was detained by the Portuguese secret police, the PIDE, and interrogated. She was released the following day following her mother's intervention by refusing to leave the PIDE building until her daughter was released. She supported her brother in hiding from the PIDE and was subject to several further arrests for interrogation when he was in hiding. She was a regular visitor to him between 1949 and 1960 when he was held in prison in Peniche Fortress until his escape. At the age of 21, she married psychiatrist Fernando Medina, cousin of the writer and communist activist Urbano Tavares Rodrigues. Her husband committed suicide in 1964. They had four children, three sons and a daughter.

In 1973 Cunhal collaborated in the production of the short film Jaime, directed by António Reis, about an artist who was an inmate of a psychiatric hospital. She joined the National Council of Portuguese Women, working with the council's president, Maria Lamas, and was also part of the Portuguese Women's Association for Peace. From 1978 to 1982 she worked as a journalist for Mulheres magazine, a publication linked to the Women's Democratic Movement, with Maria Teresa Horta as editor-in-chief. There she published, among others, a report on the Panasqueira mines, and another on women workers, entitled Women of Setúbal: Many forms of Life.

Cunhal's only television interview was given to RTP 1, in 2005, to the journalist Judite de Sousa. Later, she would collaborate on a book by De Sousa about the life of Alvaro Cunhal, entitled Álvaro, Eugénia and Ana, which aimed to reveal "the man behind the politician".

== Death ==
Cunhal died in Lisbon on 10 December 2015. Her ashes were buried at the Alto de São João Cemetery.

== Publications ==
Cunhal wrote poetry and novels. In a 1962 poem, published shortly after her brother's escape from Peniche, she provided a sentimental portrait of the tragedy of the Cunhal family, with two deceased children and an absent son living in Moscow.

=== Poetry ===
- O Silêncio de Vidro (The Silence of Glass - 1962)
- As Mãos e o Gesto (The Hands and the Gesture - 2000)

=== Prose ===
- História de Um Condenado à Morte (Story of Someone Sentenced to Death - 1983)
- Relva Verde Para Cláudio (Green Grass for Cláudio - 2003)
- Escrita de Esferográfica (Ballpoint Writing - 2008)
