= Cunhal =

Cunhal is a surname. Notable people with the surname include:

- Álvaro Cunhal (1913–2005), Portuguese communist
- Maria Eugénia Cunhal (1927–2015), Portuguese communist, sister of Álvaro Cunhal
