= List of directors associated with art film =

The film directors in this list have made films that were deemed to be notable art films by prominent critics, film festivals, and/or by authors of books on the history of film.

== A ==
- Eduard Abalov
- Dodo Abashidze
- Vadim Abdrashitov
- Aktan Abdykalykov
- John Abraham
- Lenny Abrahamson
- Maren Ade
- Bas Jan Ader
- Percy Adlon
- Roland af Hällström
- Ashim Ahluwalia
- Eija-Liisa Ahtila
- Chantal Akerman
- Fatih Akin
- Grigori Aleksandrov
- Tomas Alfredson
- Adolfo Alix Jr.
- Khalik Allah
- Woody Allen
- Pedro Almodóvar
- Lisandro Alonso
- Usama Alshaibi
- Robert Altman
- Alejandro Amenábar
- Ana Lily Amirpour
- Laurie Anderson
- Lindsay Anderson
- Paul Thomas Anderson
- Wes Anderson
- Roy Andersson
- Theo Angelopoulos
- Kenneth Anger
- Urszula Antoniak
- Michelangelo Antonioni
- Shinji Aoyama
- Gregg Araki
- G. Aravindan
- Denys Arcand
- Cam Archer
- Jane Arden
- Dario Argento
- Artur Aristakisyan
- Morten Arnfred
- Andrea Arnold
- Martin Arnold
- Darren Aronofsky
- Grigori Aronov
- Fernando Arrabal
- Dinara Asanova
- Hal Ashby
- Don Askarian
- Walter D. Asmus
- Olivier Assayas
- Ari Aster
- Jacques Audiard
- Bille August
- Ilya Averbakh
- Tex Avery
- Nurith Aviv
- Gabriel Axel
- Richard Ayoade
- Hideaki Anno

== B ==
- Jamie Babbit
- Héctor Babenco
- Frédéric Back
- Emir Baigazin
- Bruce Baillie
- Sean Baker
- Ralph Bakshi
- Aleksei Balabanov
- Roman Balayan
- Robert Banks
- Scott Barley
- Siddiq Barmak
- Boris Barnet
- Matthew Barney
- Claude Barras
- Jiří Barta
- Šarūnas Bartas
- Svetlana Baskova
- Michal Bat-Adam
- Yevgeni Bauer
- Noah Baumbach
- Pina Bausch
- Henry Bean
- Xavier Beauvois
- Jean Becker
- Jean-Jacques Beineix
- Marco Bellocchio
- Rémy Belvaux
- Carmelo Bene
- James Benning
- Ingmar Bergman
- Wallace Berman
- Bernardo Bertolucci
- Luc Besson
- Frank Beyer
- Bi Gan
- Susanne Bier
- Kathryn Bigelow
- Albert Birney
- Stig Björkman
- David Blair
- Les Blair
- Bertrand Blier
- John G. Blystone
- Lidia Bobrova
- Hynek Bočan
- Sergei Bodrov
- Gábor Bódy
- Christoffer Boe
- Peter Bogdanovich
- Patrick Bokanowski
- Sergei Bondarchuk
- Bertrand Bonello
- Bong Joon-ho
- André Bonzel
- John Boorman
- Ole Bornedal
- Walerian Borowczyk
- Vladimir Bortko
- Stan Brakhage
- Kenneth Branagh
- Catherine Breillat
- Robert Bresson
- Vinko Brešan
- Matthew Bright
- Tricia Brock
- Lino Brocka
- Peter Brook
- James Broughton
- Clyde Bruckman
- Günter Brus
- Zbyněk Brynych
- Luis Buñuel
- Andrew Bujalski
- Charles Burnett
- Rama Burshtein
- Tim Burton
- Steve Buscemi
- Jayro Bustamante
- Brian Patrick Butler
- Rolan Bykov
- Yuri Bykov

== C ==
- Michael Cacoyannis
- Mike Cahill
- Robin Campillo
- Jane Campion
- António Campos
- Laurent Cantet
- Leos Carax
- Henning Carlsen
- Marcel Carné
- Heiner Carow
- Jean-Claude Carrière
- Shane Carruth
- Carlos Casas
- John Cassavetes
- Lucien Castaing-Taylor
- Hélène Cattet and Bruno Forzani
- Liliana Cavani
- Nuri Bilge Ceylan
- Claude Chabrol
- Youssef Chahine
- Jack Chambers
- Charlie Chaplin
- Chen Kaige
- Lisa Cholodenko
- Sylvain Chomet
- Benjamin Christensen
- Grigory Chukhray
- Pavel Chukhray
- Věra Chytilová
- Derek Cianfrance
- Michael Cimino
- Souleymane Cissé
- Jean-Paul Civeyrac
- René Clair
- Larry Clark
- Alan Clarke
- Shirley Clarke
- René Clément
- Edward F. Cline
- Henri-Georges Clouzot
- Jean Cocteau
- Joel and Ethan Coen
- Isabel Coixet
- Bruce Conner
- Tony Conrad
- Francis Ford Coppola
- Sofia Coppola
- Anton Corbijn
- Alain Corneau
- Panos Cosmatos
- Pedro Costa
- Saverio Costanzo
- David Cronenberg
- John Crowley
- Sally Cruikshank
- Alfonso Cuarón
- Jonás Cuarón
- Michael Cuesta
- Chris Cunningham

== D ==
- Stephen Daldry
- Mircea Daneliuc
- Georgiy Daneliya
- Serge Daney
- Dardenne brothers
- Hajir Darioush
- Buddhadeb Dasgupta
- Charlotte Dauphin
- Terence Davies
- Assi Dayan
- Rolf de Heer
- Storm de Hirsch
- Brian De Palma
- Vittorio De Sica
- Benoît Delépine
- François Delisle
- André Delvaux
- Zeki Demirkubuz
- Jacques Demy
- Claire Denis
- Maya Deren
- Virginie Despentes
- Arnaud Desplechin
- Michel Deville
- Mohamed Diab
- Diao Yinan
- Lav Diaz
- Tom DiCillo
- Vivienne Dick
- Walt Disney
- Audrey Diwan
- Xavier Dolan
- Andrew Dominik
- Gianmarco Donaggio
- Marian Dora
- Ziad Doueiri
- Bill Douglas
- Alexander Dovzhenko
- Robert Downey Sr.
- Srđan Dragojević
- Andreas Dresen
- Carl Theodor Dreyer
- Anselmo Duarte
- Fabrice Du Welz
- Marcel Duchamp
- Julia Ducournau
- Michaël Dudok de Wit
- Slatan Dudow
- Germaine Dulac
- Piotr Dumała
- Bruno Dumont
- Lena Dunham
- Jay Duplass
- Mark Duplass
- Marguerite Duras
- Guru Dutt
- Sergey Dvortsevoy
- Ivan Dykhovichny

== E ==
- Viking Eggeling
- Robert Eggers
- Atom Egoyan
- Fernando Eimbcke
- Sergei Eisenstein
- Ronit Elkabetz
- Shlomi Elkabetz
- Adam Elliot
- Morris Engel
- Ildikó Enyedi
- Jean Epstein
- Reha Erdem
- Anna Eriksson
- Víctor Erice
- Benedikt Erlingsson
- Pelin Esmer
- Jean Eustache
- Valie Export
- Richard Eyre

== F ==
- Zoltán Fábri
- Asghar Farhadi
- Harun Farocki
- Forugh Farrokhzad
- Rainer Werner Fassbinder
- Aleksey Fedorchenko
- Federico Fellini
- Abel Ferrara
- Marco Ferreri
- Louis Feuillade
- Todd Field
- Mike Figgis
- David Fincher
- Nora Fingscheidt
- Oskar Fischinger
- Benedek Fliegauf
- Ari Folman
- Frédéric Fonteyne
- John Ford
- Tom Ford
- Miloš Forman
- Mira Fornay
- Marc Forster
- Bob Fosse
- James Fotopoulos
- Michelangelo Frammartino
- Hollis Frampton
- Robert Frank
- John Frankenheimer
- Ron Fricke
- Gabríela Friðriksdóttir
- Friðrik Þór Friðriksson
- William Friedkin
- Su Friedrich
- Dmitrii Frolov
- Shozin Fukui
- Samuel Fuller

== G ==
- Savi Gabizon
- Vincent Gallo
- Nisha Ganatra
- Abel Gance
- Anand Gandhi
- Erik Gandini
- Rodrigo García
- Philippe Garrel
- Matteo Garrone
- Tony Gatlif
- Costa-Gavras
- Saša Gedeon
- Jean Genet
- Aleksei Alekseivich German
- Aleksei Yuryevich German
- Valeriya Gai Germanika
- Pietro Germi
- Greta Gerwig
- Ritwik Ghatak
- Bahman Ghobadi
- Goutam Ghose
- Rituparno Ghosh
- Terry Gilliam
- Milton Moses Ginsberg
- François Girard
- Amos Gitai
- Jonathan Glazer
- Crispin Glover
- Jean-Luc Godard
- Lana Gogoberidze
- Dana Goldberg
- Flora Gomes
- Miguel Gomes
- Rita Azevedo Gomes
- Alfonso Gomez-Rejon
- Michel Gondry
- Alejandro González Iñárritu
- Adoor Gopalakrishnan
- Hideo Gosha
- Philippe Grandrieux
- Debra Granik
- James Gray
- William Greaves
- David Gordon Green
- Eugène Green
- Peter Greenaway
- John Greyson
- D. W. Griffith
- Iveta Grófová
- Kristina Grozeva
- Luca Guadagnino
- José Luis Guerín
- Ciro Guerra
- Alain Guiraudie
- David Gurfinkel
- Tomás Gutiérrez Alea
- Amos Guttman
- Alice Guy-Blaché
- Patricio Guzmán

== H ==
- Alexandr Hackenschmied
- Andrew Haigh
- Szabolcs Hajdu
- Ryusuke Hamaguchi
- Dušan Hanák
- Michael Haneke
- Susumu Hani
- Mia Hansen-Løve
- Hal Hartley
- Wojciech Has
- Jessica Hausner
- Howard Hawks
- Todd Haynes
- Michel Hazanavicius
- Jalmari Helander
- Ladislav Helge
- Piero Heliczer
- Veit Helmer
- John Huston
- Florian Henckel von Donnersmarck
- Don Hertzfeldt
- Juraj Herz
- Werner Herzog
- Tomer Heymann
- John Hillcoat
- Damien Hirst
- Alfred Hitchcock
- Joanna Hogg
- Agnieszka Holland
- Hong Sang-soo
- Christophe Honoré
- Harry Hook
- Dennis Hopper
- Hou Hsiao-hsien
- Hu Bo
- Ágnes Hranitzky
- Huang Jianxin
- Ann Hui
- Karim Hussain
- Eva Husson
- Zoltán Huszárik

== I ==
- Armando Iannucci
- Kon Ichikawa
- Yuri Ilyenko
- Im Kwon-taek
- Im Sang-soo
- Shōhei Imamura
- Hiroshi Inagaki
- Otar Iosseliani
- Gakuryū Ishii
- Katsuhito Ishii
- Teruo Ishii
- Isidore Isou
- Juzo Itami
- James Ivory
- Shunji Iwai

== J ==
- Ken Jacobs
- Peter Jackson
- Andrzej Jakimowski
- Juraj Jakubisko
- Miklós Jancsó
- Derek Jarman
- Jim Jarmusch
- Vojtěch Jasný
- Anders Thomas Jensen
- Jeffrey Jeturian
- Jean-Pierre Jeunet
- Norman Jewison
- Jia Zhangke
- Jaromil Jireš
- Akio Jissoji
- Alejandro Jodorowsky
- Roland Joffé
- Antti Jokinen
- Matt Johnson
- Chuck Jones
- G. B. Jones
- Terry Jones
- Spike Jonze
- Neil Jordan
- Nana Jorjadze
- Jon Jost
- Radu Jude
- Miranda July
- Pavel Juráček

== K ==
- Karel Kachyňa
- Ján Kadár
- Alexander Kaidanovsky
- Mikheil Kalatozishvili
- Mikhail Kalatozov
- Tom Kalin
- Vitali Kanevsky
- Semih Kaplanoğlu
- Dagur Kári
- Alex Karpovsky
- Dome Karukoski
- Shaji N. Karun
- Anurag Kashyap
- Mathieu Kassovitz
- Sunao Katabuchi
- Jacques Katmor
- Charlie Kaufman
- Mani Kaul
- Aki Kaurismäki
- Mika Kaurismäki
- Yoshiaki Kawajiri
- Jerzy Kawalerowicz
- Kihachirō Kawamoto
- Naomi Kawase
- Elia Kazan
- Buster Keaton
- Abdellatif Kechiche
- Dorota Kędzierzawska
- Patrick Keiller
- Fred Kelemen
- Jennifer Kent
- Richard Kern
- Amanda Kernell
- Lodge Kerrigan
- Gustave Kervern
- Aharon Keshales
- Rustam Khamdamov
- Mariam Khatchvani
- Nikolay Khomeriki
- Vladimir Khotinenko
- Marlen Khutsiev
- Abbas Kiarostami
- Krzysztof Kieślowski
- Kim Jee-woon
- Kim Ki-duk
- Kim Ki-duk
- Kim Ki-young
- Keisuke Kinoshita
- Teinosuke Kinugasa
- Dimitri Kirsanoff
- Takeshi Kitano
- William Klein
- Elem Klimov
- Elmar Klos
- Alexander Kluge
- Masaki Kobayashi
- Dorota Kobiela
- Eran Kolirin
- Jan Komasa
- Satoshi Kon
- Andrei Konchalovsky
- Jenni Konner
- Tadeusz Konwicki
- Hirokazu Kore-eda
- Harmony Korine
- John Korty
- Marek Koterski
- Alexander Kott
- Petri Kotwica
- Panos H. Koutras
- András Kovács
- Grigori Kozintsev
- Robert Kramer
- Andrei Kravchuk
- Jiří Krejčík
- Kurt Kren
- Grzegorz Królikiewicz
- Václav Krška
- Peter Kubelka
- Stanley Kubrick
- George Kuchar
- Lev Kuleshov
- Lev Kulidzhanov
- Dea Kulumbegashvili
- Kazuo Kuroki
- Akira Kurosawa
- Kiyoshi Kurosawa
- Justin Kurzel
- Emir Kusturica
- Kazimierz Kutz
- Stanley Kwan

== L ==
- Nadine Labaki
- Bruce LaBruce
- Edvin Laine
- René Laloux
- Albert Lamorisse
- Fritz Lang
- Yorgos Lanthimos
- Claude Lanzmann
- Nadav Lapid
- Pablo Larraín
- Charles Laughton
- Jean-Claude Lauzon
- Standish Lawder
- David Lean
- Patrice Leconte
- Ang Lee
- Lee Chang-dong
- Spike Lee
- Robin Lefevre
- Xavier Legrand
- C. S. Leigh
- Mike Leigh
- Sebastián Lelio
- Claude Lelouch
- Karl Lemieux
- Jan Lenica
- Sergio Leone
- Philippe Lesage
- Jørgen Leth
- Hagai Levi
- Don Levy
- Li Yang
- Jens Lien
- Tobias Lindholm
- Richard Linklater
- Michael Lindsay-Hogg
- Jody Lee Lipes
- Miguel Littín
- Renata Litvinova
- Carlo Lizzani
- Ken Loach
- Barbara Loden
- Ram Loevy
- Kenneth Lonergan
- Konstantin Lopushansky
- Joseph Losey
- Marie Losier
- Emil Loteanu
- Aku Louhimies
- Richard Lowenstein
- David Lowery
- Sergei Loznitsa
- Ernst Lubitsch
- Sidney Lumet
- Lumière brothers
- Pavel Lungin
- Ladj Ly
- Len Lye
- David Lynch

== M ==
- Gustav Machatý
- Jodie Mack
- Guy Maddin
- Kurt Maetzig
- Maïwenn
- Lech Majewski
- Majid Majidi
- Dušan Makavejev
- Hana Makhmalbaf
- Mohsen Makhmalbaf
- Samira Makhmalbaf
- Terrence Malick
- Louis Malle
- Djibril Diop Mambéty
- David Mamet
- Milcho Manchevski
- Joseph L. Mankiewicz
- Samuel Maoz
- Václav Marhoul
- Chris Marker
- Gregory Markopoulos
- Joshua Marston
- Lucrecia Martel
- Raya Martin
- Francesco Maselli
- Vladimir Maslov
- Yasuzo Masumura
- Yoshihiko Matsui
- Toshio Matsumoto
- Elaine May
- John Maybury
- Tom McCarthy
- John Michael McDonagh
- Martin McDonagh
- Ross McElwee
- Norman McLaren
- Conor McPherson
- Steve McQueen
- Julio Medem
- Aleksandr Medvedkin
- Dariush Mehrjui
- Ursula Meier
- Fernando Meirelles
- Jonas Mekas
- Georges Méliès
- Anna Melikian
- Jean-Pierre Melville
- Sam Mendes
- Brillante Mendoza
- Marie Menken
- Jiří Menzel
- E. Elias Merhige
- Natalya Merkulova
- Dmitry Meskhiev
- Márta Mészáros
- Radley Metzger
- Takashi Miike
- Nikita Mikhalkov
- Bennett Miller
- Aleksandr Mindadze
- Vincente Minnelli
- Kenji Misumi
- David Robert Mitchell
- John Cameron Mitchell
- Katie Mitchell
- Alexander Mitta
- Cătălin Mitulescu
- Gorō Miyazaki
- Hayao Miyazaki
- Kenji Mizoguchi
- Moshé Mizrahi
- Jean-Pierre Mocky
- Hans Petter Moland
- Mario Monicelli
- Ivor Montagu
- João César Monteiro
- Lukas Moodysson
- Michael Moore
- Tomm Moore
- Nanni Moretti
- Jon Moritsugu
- Bill Morrison
- Phil Morrison
- Paul Morrissey
- Lemohang Jeremiah Mosese
- Granaz Moussavi
- Oren Moverman
- Otto Muehl
- Peter Mullan
- Matthias Müller
- Milagros Mumenthaler
- Kornél Mundruczó
- Cristian Mungiu
- Andrzej Munk
- Radu Muntean
- Kira Muratova
- F. W. Murnau

== N ==
- Na Hong-jin
- Amir Naderi
- Mira Nair
- Nobuo Nakagawa
- Pan Nalin
- Mikio Naruse
- Leonid Nechayev
- Jan Němec
- László Nemes
- Avi Nesher
- Jeff Nichols
- Mike Nichols
- Marysia Nikitiuk
- Elena Nikolaeva
- Nikos Nikolaidis
- Rob Nilsson
- Nonzee Nimibutr
- Mikko Niskanen
- Hermann Nitsch
- Gaspar Noé
- Michael Noer
- Tom Noonan
- Victor Nord
- Yuri Norstein
- Yrjö Norta
- Rashid Nugmanov

== O ==
- Nobuhiko Obayashi
- Damien O’Donnell
- Mr. Oizo
- Kihachi Okamoto
- Manoel de Oliveira
- Laurence Olivier
- Ermanno Olmi
- Gulshat Omarova
- David Ondříček
- Pat O'Neill
- Max Ophüls
- Niels Arden Oplev
- Ruth Orkin
- Mamoru Oshii
- Nagisa Ōshima
- Ruben Östlund
- Leonid Osyka
- Katsuhiro Otomo
- Ulrike Ottinger
- Idrissa Ouédraogo
- Veiko Õunpuu
- Giorgi Ovashvili
- François Ozon
- Ferzan Özpetek
- Yasujirō Ozu

== P ==
- G. W. Pabst
- Roberto Paci Dalò
- Alan J. Pakula
- Euzhan Palcy
- György Pálfi
- Jafar Panahi
- Gleb Panfilov
- Navot Papushado
- Sergei Parajanov
- Park Chan-wook
- Nick Park
- Alan Parker
- Goran Paskaljević
- Pier Paolo Pasolini
- Ivan Passer
- Živojin Pavlović
- Paweł Pawlikowski
- Alexander Payne
- Sam Peckinpah
- Jordan Peele
- Mário Peixoto
- Artavazd Peleshyan
- Arthur Penn
- Sean Penn
- Nicolás Pereda
- Nelson Pereira dos Santos
- Jesse Peretz
- Lester James Peries
- David Perlov
- Elio Petri
- Aleksandr Petrov
- Aleksandar Petrović
- Christian Petzold
- Maurice Pialat
- Franco Piavoli
- Lucian Pintilie
- Dan Pița
- Bill Plympton
- Ihor Podolchak
- Oleg Pogodin
- Roman Polanski
- Gillo Pontecorvo
- Benoît Poelvoorde
- Corneliu Porumboiu
- Sally Potter
- Michael Powell
- Joel Potrykus
- Otto Preminger
- Emeric Pressburger
- Aleksandr Proshkin
- Yakov Protazanov
- Sarah Pucill
- Vsevolod Pudovkin
- Cristi Puiu

== Q ==
- Yair Qedar
- Brothers Quay

== R ==
- Ilmar Raag
- Vulo Radev
- Michael Radford
- Tomislav Radić
- Alfréd Radok
- Bob Rafelson
- Atiq Rahimi
- Lynne Ramsay
- Gitanjali Rao
- Simone Rapisarda Casanova
- Mark Rappaport
- Pen-ek Ratanaruang
- Man Ray
- Nicholas Ray
- Satyajit Ray
- Carol Reed
- Nicolas Winding Refn
- Godfrey Reggio
- Kelly Reichardt
- António Reis
- Charles Reisner
- Karel Reisz
- Jean Renoir
- Alain Resnais
- Carlos Reygadas
- Ron Rice
- Tony Richardson
- Hans Richter
- Philip Ridley
- Marlon Riggs
- Eran Riklis
- Diana Ringo
- Arturo Ripstein
- Dino Risi
- Ben Rivers
- Jacques Rivette
- Alain Robbe-Grillet
- Glauber Rocha
- João Pedro Rodrigues
- Nicolas Roeg
- Aleksandr Rogozhkin
- Éric Rohmer
- Alice Rohrwacher
- Mikhail Romm
- Abram Room
- Jean Rouch
- Jaime Rosales
- Francesco Rosi
- Roberto Rossellini
- Patricia Rozema
- Raúl Ruiz
- Pavel Ruminov
- Ben Russell
- David O. Russell
- Ken Russell
- Walter Ruttmann
- Zbigniew Rybczyński
- Boris Rytsarev

== S ==
- Mariya Saakyan
- Olli Saarela
- Randa Chahal Sabag
- Ira Sachs
- Safdie Brothers
- Leontine Sagan
- Walter Salles
- Ville Salminen
- Helma Sanders-Brahms
- Toivo Särkkä
- Wisit Sasanatieng
- Marjane Satrapi
- Carlos Saura
- Claude Sautet
- John Sayles
- Peter Schamoni
- Angela Schanelec
- Jerry Schatzberg
- Guilhad Emilio Schenker
- Frank Scheffer
- Fred Schepisi
- Lone Scherfig
- Suzanne Schiffman
- Sebastian Schipper
- John Schlesinger
- Volker Schlöndorff
- Jan Schmidt
- Julian Schnabel
- Jane Schoenbrun
- Evald Schorm
- Maria Schrader
- Paul Schrader
- Barbet Schroeder
- Werner Schroeter
- Uli M Schueppel
- Rudolf Schwarzkogler
- Mikhail Schweitzer
- Christian Schwochow
- Céline Sciamma
- Ettore Scola
- Martin Scorsese
- Sam Seder
- Edward Sedgwick
- Ulrich Seidl
- Ousmane Sembène
- Aparna Sen
- Ivan Sen
- Mrinal Sen
- Kirill Serebrennikov
- Albert Serra
- Dror Shaul
- Dawn Shadforth
- Sohrab Shahid-Saless
- Karen Shakhnazarov
- Tali Shalom Ezer
- Viktor Shamirov
- Laizy Shapiro
- Eldar Shengelaia
- Giorgi Shengelaia
- Richard Shepard
- Larisa Shepitko
- Kaneto Shindo
- Masahiro Shinoda
- Cate Shortland
- Gennady Shpalikov
- Esfir Shub
- Vasily Shukshin
- Shyamaprasad
- Vasily Sigarev
- Slobodan Šijan
- Douglas Sirk
- Abderrahmane Sissako
- Ori Sivan
- Vilgot Sjöman
- Victor Sjöström
- Jerzy Skolimowski
- Myroslav Slaboshpytskyi
- Bohdan Sláma
- George Sluizer
- Wojciech Smarzowski
- Jack Smith
- John Smith
- Agnieszka Smoczyńska
- Michael Snow
- Steven Soderbergh
- Alexander Sokurov
- Peter Solan
- Fernando Solanas
- Humberto Solás
- Auraeus Solito
- Peter Sollett
- Todd Solondz
- Sergei Solovyov
- Sion Sono
- Ali Soozandeh
- Paolo Sorrentino
- Jane Spencer
- Jos Stelling
- Oliver Stone
- Straub–Huillet
- Peter Strickland
- Charles Sturridge
- Elia Suleiman
- Martin Šulík
- Nobuhiro Suwa
- Anocha Suwichakornpong
- Seijun Suzuki
- Jan Švankmajer
- Joe Swanberg
- Kris Swanberg
- Eric Swinderman
- Hans-Jürgen Syberberg
- Daniel Syrkin
- István Szabó
- Attila Szász
- János Szász
- Damián Szifron

== T ==
- Isao Takahata
- Alain Tanner
- Danis Tanović
- Sergey Taramaev
- Andrei Tarkovsky
- Béla Tarr
- Jacques Tati
- Sophie Tatischeff
- Bertrand Tavernier
- Paolo and Vittorio Taviani
- Julie Taymor
- André Téchiné
- Shūji Terayama
- Hiroshi Teshigahara
- Tian Zhuangzhuang
- Johnnie To
- Valery Todorovsky
- Giuseppe Tornatore
- Guillermo del Toro
- Tran Anh Hung
- Dušan Trančík
- Leonid Trauberg
- Monika Treut
- Joachim Trier
- Coralie Trinh Thi
- Jiří Trnka
- Jan Troell
- François Truffaut
- Tsai Ming-liang
- Athina Rachel Tsangari
- Peter Tscherkassky
- Dito Tsintsadze
- Shinya Tsukamoto
- Teuvo Tulio
- Nikita Tyagunov
- Tom Tykwer

== U ==
- Alexei Uchitel
- Ekachai Uekrongtham
- Štefan Uher
- Zaza Urushadze

== V ==
- Karel Vachek
- Petr Václav
- Petar Valchanov
- Jean-Marc Vallée
- Jaco Van Dormael
- Theo van Gogh
- Felix van Groeningen
- Philippe Van Leeuw
- Gus Van Sant
- Alex van Warmerdam
- Agnès Varda
- Valentyn Vasyanovych
- Paul Vecchiali
- Alexander Veledinsky
- Paul Verhoeven
- Mircea Veroiu
- Dziga Vertov
- Lorenzo Vigas
- Jean Vigo
- Drahomíra Vihanová
- Agustí Villaronga
- Denis Villeneuve
- Thomas Vinterberg
- Bill Viola
- Eriprando Visconti
- Luchino Visconti
- František Vláčil
- Josef von Sternberg
- Erich von Stroheim
- Lars von Trier
- Margarethe von Trotta
- Ivan Vyrypaev

== W ==
- Michael Wadleigh
- Cynthia Wade
- Taika Waititi
- Andrzej Wajda
- Kōji Wakamatsu
- Wang Bing
- Wayne Wang
- Wang Xiaoshuai
- Andy Warhol
- John Waters
- Peter Watkins
- Lois Weber
- Apichatpong Weerasethakul
- Peter Weibel
- Claudia Weill
- Peter Weir
- Jiří Weiss
- Hugh Welchman
- Orson Welles
- Wim Wenders
- Ben Wheatley
- Robert Wiene
- Eduardo Williams
- Michael Winterbottom
- Wong Kar-wai

== Y ==
- Yoji Yamada
- Edward Yang
- Yeon Sang-ho
- Yoshishige Yoshida
- Masaaki Yuasa
- Yevgeny Yufit

== Z ==
- Lordan Zafranović
- Caveh Zahedi
- S. Craig Zahler
- Mark Zakharov
- Krzysztof Zanussi
- Jasmila Žbanić
- Nick Zedd
- Franco Zeffirelli
- Benh Zeitlin
- Petr Zelenka
- Karel Zeman
- Thierry Zéno
- Zhang Yimou
- Lydia Zimmermann
- Uri Zohar
- David Zonana
- Andrzej Żuławski
- Valerio Zurlini
- Alyona Zvantsova
- Andrey Zvyagintsev
- Terry Zwigoff
