= Hegel's Angel =

2018 film dir. Simone Rapisarda Casanova

- Zanj Hegel la
- Directed by: Simone Rapisarda Casanova
- Starring: Pierre Widley Phadaël, Mentor Rood, Eddy Fleursaint, Gala Calisto, Philippe Petit, Ebby Angel Louis.
- Release date: October 13, 2018 (Syracuse International Film Festival)
- Running time: 70 minutes
- Country: Canada / Haiti / Italy / United States

Hegel's Angel (Haitian Creole: Zanj Hegel la) is a 2018 experimental film directed by Simone Rapisarda Casanova.

== Plot summary ==
Inspired by Vodou and Kanaval cosmologies, and co-written with the entire cast and crew, Hegel's Angel is an experimental ethnofiction that challenges the boundaries between film genres. The film, set in Haiti, follows an inquisitive boy named Widley whose life unfolds away from the turmoil of an upcoming presidential election. The boy plays football, goes swimming, works with his father on odd jobs, and visits a local editor who is putting together a film within the film while lamenting the director’s disappearance. Throughout, Widley witnesses the struggle of his people under what has been dubbed “the charitable-industrial complex”, and the transition from one foreign domination to another.

== Production ==
Hegel's Angel is the third feature film by Simone Rapisarda Casanova. It is the result of the experience the artist had in 2013 and 2014 while living and working as a film teacher in Jacmel, Haiti. As in his previous works, the artist’s stylistic hallmarks include his elliptical, metacinematic approach to storytelling, his unconventional collaboration with non-actors, his use of natural light and colour inspired by Renaissance paintings, along with meticulously-composed single-takes and diegetic soundscapes. His approach to filmmaking is mostly process-driven, after careful research of the thematic base. Unlike Rapisarda's previous works, where he adopted a "one-man-crew" approach, Hegel's Angel is the result of his tight collaboration with a small crew composed by former students and their relatives and friends. Rapisarda’s commitment to collaboration, or “shared ethnography”, as inspired by filmmaker and anthropologist Jean Rouch, infuses his work and results in all participants being credited as co-writers of the film. The intent behind the artist's stylistic and methodological choices is to create a cinematic occasion where people and places may reveal their deepest nature.

== Theoretical aspects ==
In this as in previous films, the author questions the ethics of ethnographic filmmaking, and especially of Western ethnographic filmmaking documenting life in developing nations. He strives to make the spectator aware of cinematic artificiality by means of a reflexive style that repeatedly and in various ways exposes the directorial performance. This choice also provides him with a tool to explore the boundaries of the cinematic medium. Since this approach doesn't clear the ethical issues, Rapisarda adopts a wide range of actions, inside and outside the filmmaking process, to balance what he considers the implicit exploitative character of the medium. The film attempts to give of Haiti, a country traditionally under-documented in cinema, an image that finally embodies a plurality of cosmological views. The title blends together ideas drawn from the work of Walter Benjamin "Theses on the Philosophy of History" and Susan Buck-Morss argument on Hegel's theorization of the master-slave dialectic following the Haitian Revolution of 1791.

== Release and critical response ==
=== Awards ===
==== 2019 ====
- Best Feature Film, Collected Voices Ethnographic Film Festival, Chicago, Il, USA
- Best Indigenous African Feature, Quetzalcoatl Indigenous International Film Festival, Oaxaca, Mexico
- Best Narrative Feature, Etowah Film Festival, Canton, OH, USA
- Outstanding Achievement Award for Experimental Films, Druk International Film Festival, Paro, Bhutan
- Best Feature Film Platinum Award, Mindfield Film Festival, Albuquerque, NM, USA

==== 2018 ====
- Best Experimental Film, Falcon International Film Festival, London, UK
