= Ethnofiction =

Subfield of ethnography

Ethnofiction is a subfield of ethnography which produces works that introduce art, in the form of storytelling, "thick descriptions and conversational narratives", and even first-person autobiographical accounts, into academic works.

In addition to written texts, the term has also been used in the context of filmmaking, where it refers to ethnographic docufiction, a blend of documentary and fictional film. It is a film type in which, by means of fictional narrative or creative imagination, often improvised, the portrayed characters (natives) play their own roles as members of an ethnic or social group.

== History ==
Ethnologist Jean Rouch is considered to be the father of ethnofiction, with Robert Flaherty as an ancestor. Rouch discovered that a filmmaker interferes with the event he registers: the behavior of the portrayed individuals, the natives, will be affected by the camera's presence. Contrary to the principles of Marcel Griaule, his mentor, Rouch considers it impossible for a non-participating camera to record "pure" events in ethnographic research.

An ethnographer cameraman, in this view, will be accepted as a natural partner by the actors who play their roles. The cameraman will be one of them, and may even be possessed by the rhythm of dancers during a ritual celebration and induced in a state of cine-trance. Rouch thus introduced the actor as a tool in research.

Ethnofiction has also been developed in Portuguese cinema. Ethnic films have been common in Portugal since the 1930s, particularly from the 1960s to the 1980s and in the early 21st century. The remote Trás-os-Montes region in Portugal and the former Portuguese colonies of Guinea-Bissau and the Cape Verde islands are common subjects of such films. These films depict local realities along with legends and surreal imagery, producing works of ethnofiction.

== Chronology ==
=== 1910s ===
- 1914 – In the Land of the Head Hunters by Edward S. Curtis, Canada

=== 1920s ===
- 1926 – Moana by Robert Flaherty, US

=== 1930s ===
- 1930 – Maria do Mar by José Leitão de Barros, Portugal
- 1931 – Tabu written by Robert Flaherty and directed by F. W. Murnau, US
- 1932 – L'Or des mers by Jean Epstein, France
- 1933 – Las Hurdes: Tierra Sin Pan by Luis Buñuel, Spain
- 1934 – Man of Aran by Robert Flaherty, UK

=== 1940s ===
- 1942 – Ala-Arriba! by José Leitão de Barros, Portugal
- 1948 – Louisiana Story by Robert Flaherty, US

=== 1950s ===
- 1955 – Les maîtres fous (The Mad Masters) by Jean Rouch, France
- 1958 – Moi, un noir (Me a Black) by Jean Rouch, France

=== 1960s ===
- 1961 – La pyramide humaine by Jean Rouch, France
- 1962 – Acto da Primavera (Act of Spring) by Manoel de Oliveira, Portugal
- 1963 – Pour la suite du monde (Of Whales, the Moon and Men) by Pierre Perrault and Michel Brault, Canada
- 1967 – Jaguar, by Jean Rouch, France

=== 1970s ===
- 1976 – People from Praia da Vieira (Gente da Praia da Vieira) by António Campos, Portugal
- 1976 – Trás-os-Montes by António Reis and Margarida Cordeiro, Portugal

=== 1980s ===
- 1982 – Nelisita: narrativas nyaneka by Ruy Duarte de Carvalho, Angola
- 1988 – Mortu Nega (Death Denied) by Flora Gomes, Guiné-Bissau

=== 1990s ===
- 1997 – Ossos by Pedro Costa, Portugal

=== 2000s ===
- 2000 – No Quarto da Vanda (In Vanda's Room) by Pedro Costa, Portugal
- 2003 – Terra Longe (Remote Land) by Daniel E. Thorbecke
- 2006 – Colossal Youth by Pedro Costa, Portugal
- 2007 – Transfiction by Johannes Sjöberg

=== 2010s ===
- 2011 – Toomelah by Ivan Sen
- 2012 – The Act of Killing by Joshua Oppenheimer, Indonesia
- 2014 – Cavalo Dinheiro (Horse Money) by Pedro Costa, Portugal
- 2014 – La creazione di significato (The Creation of Meaning) by Simone Rapisarda Casanova, Italy
- 2015 – Dead Slow Ahead by Mauro Herce
- 2018 – Zanj Hegel la (Hegel's Angel) by Simone Rapisarda Casanova, Haiti
- 2018 – The Dead and the Others by João Salaviza, Portugal
- 2019 – Vitalina Varela by Pedro Costa, Portugal
- 2019 – Work, or To Whom Does the World Belong, by Elisa Cepedal, Spain
- 2024 – Anime galleggianti by Maria Giménez Cavallo, Sardinia

== See also ==
- Direct cinema
- Docufiction
- Ethnographic film
- Ethnography
- Media ecology
- Visual anthropology
