= Maria do Mar =

1930 film

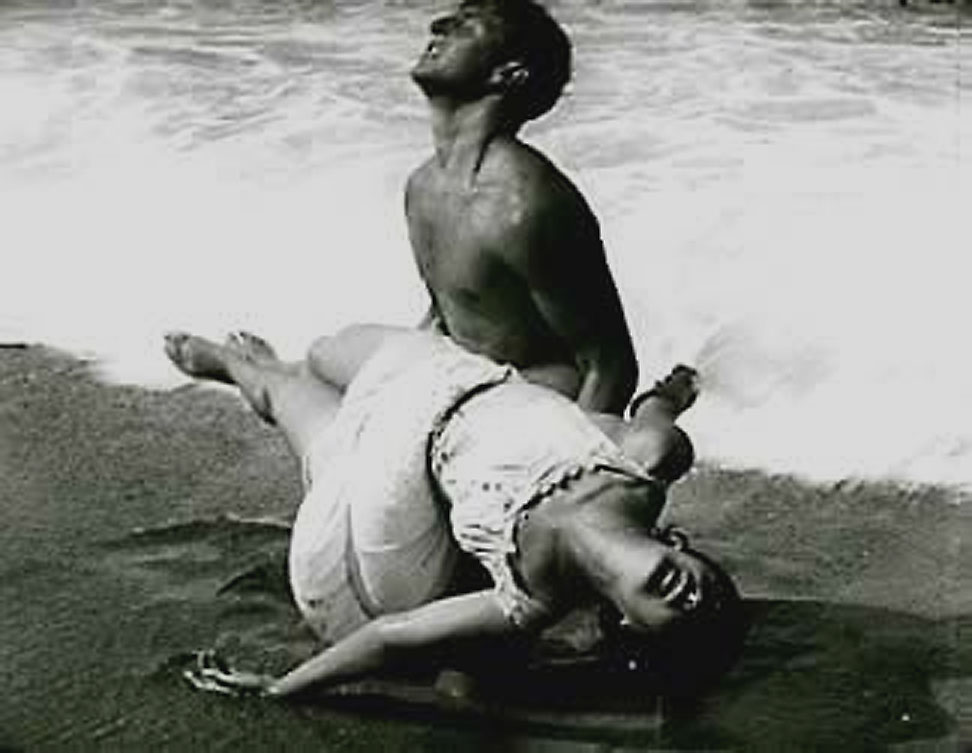
- Directed by: Leitão de Barros
- Music by: Bernardo Sassetti (2000)
- Release dates: 20 May 1930 (Lisbon); March 2000 (premiere of restoration)
- Country: Portugal
- Languages: Silent; Portuguese intertitles

Maria do Mar is a 1930 Portuguese silent drama film, a docufiction, directed by Leitão de Barros. In March 2000, the Portuguese Cinematheque released a restoration of the film in Lisbon and Porto.

The film is notable not just for its narrative but also for its innovative use of cinematic techniques influenced by German expressionism, Soviet montage, and American filmmaking styles. It is considered one of the earliest examples of "ethnofiction," where real cultural and social practices are depicted within a fictional framework. The film's documentary-like authenticity is one of its strengths, capturing the everyday struggles and resilience of Nazaré's fishing community.

== Plot ==
Maria do Mar is a pivotal work in Portuguese cinema that blends documentary realism with fiction. The film portrays the lives of fishermen in the coastal village of Nazaré, focusing on the intense rivalry between two families. The conflict originates from a tragic incident at sea, where the actions of Falacha, one of the protagonists, lead to the death of another fisherman. This animosity is further complicated by the romantic relationship between Maria do Mar, the daughter of one of the deceased fishermen, and Manuel, Falacha’s son. Despite their love, the couple faces opposition from their families, mirroring a "Romeo and Juliet" scenario set against the harsh and rugged backdrop of a fishing community.

== See also ==
- Docufiction
- List of docufiction films
