= Rite of Spring (film) =

- Directed by: Manoel de Oliveira
- Written by: Manoel de Oliveira; Francisco Vaz De Guimaraes
- Produced by: Manoel de Oliveira
- Starring: Nicolau Nunes Da Silva; Ermelinda Pires; Maria Madalena; Amélia Chaves; Luis De Sousa; Francisco Luís
- Cinematography: Manoel de Oliveira
- Edited by: Manoel de Oliveira
- Release date: 1963
- Running time: 90 minutes
- Country: Portugal
- Language: Portuguese

Rite of Spring (Portuguese: Acto da Primavera) is a 1963 Portuguese docudrama film directed by Manoel de Oliveira, his second feature, and co-written by Francisco Vaz De Guimaraes.

Poet and director António Reis served as assistant director, and his influence can be felt deeply throughout. The film was included in the 2012 program The School of Reis.

== Synopsis ==
The inhabitants of Curalha, a small village in western Portugal, perform the Passion of Jesus every year according to text from about the 16th century, a tradition upon which Oliveira stumbled during the production of a film in 1963. The film is also remembered for "a furious apocalyptic montage that links Christ's death to the violence and lunacy of the Vietnam era".

== See also ==
- Docufiction
- List of docufiction films
- Ethnofiction
