= Moi, un noir =

1958 French film directed by Jean Rouch

- Promotional release poster
- Directed by: Jean Rouch
- Written by: André Lubin
- Produced by: Pierre Braunberger; Roger Felytoux
- Starring: Oumarou Ganda as Edward G. Robinson; Petit Tourè as Eddie Constantine; Alassane Maiga as Tarzan; Amadou Demba as Élite; Seydou Guede as Postman; Karido Faoudou as Petit Jules; Mademoiselle Gambi as Dorothy Lamour
- Narrated by: Jean Rouch; Oumarou Ganda
- Cinematography: Jean Rouch
- Edited by: Marie-Josèphe Yoyotte; Catherine Dourgnon
- Music by: Yopi Joseph Degré; Chants by: Miryam Touré; N'Daye Yéro; Amadou Demba
- Distributed by: Films de la Pléiade
- Release date: 1958 (France)
- Running time: 73 minutes
- Countries: France; Ivory Coast
- Language: French

Moi, un noir ([mwa œ̃ nwaʁ], "Me, a Black [person]"; also released as I, a Negro) is a 1958 French ethnofiction film directed by Jean Rouch. The film is set in Abidjan, Ivory Coast.

== Synopsis ==
The film depicts young Nigerien immigrants who left their country to find work in the Ivory Coast, in the Treichville quarter of Abidjan, the capital. These immigrants live in squalor in Treichville, envious of the bordering quarters of The Plateau (the business and industrial district) and the old African quarter of Adjame. These young immigrants are Oumarou Ganda (portraying himself under the pseudonym of Edward G. Robinson, a nickname he adopts because of his idolization of and slight resemblance to the eponymous movie star), Petit Tourè (portraying himself as Eddie Constantine), Alassane Maiga (Tarzan), Amadou Demba (Élite), Seydou Guede (Postman), and Karidyo Daoudou (Petit Jules).

The film traces a week in these immigrants’ lives, blurring the line between their characters’ routines and their own. Every morning, Tarzan, Eddy Constantine and Edward G. Robinson seek work in Treichville in hopes of getting the 20 francs that a bowl of soup costs them. They perform menial jobs as dockers carrying sacks and handy labour shipping supplies to Europe.

At night, they drink away their sorrows in bars while dreaming about their idealised lives as their "movie" alter-egos, alternatively as an FBI Agent, a womanizing bachelor, a successful boxer, and even able to stand up to the white colonialists that seduce away their women. These dream-like sequences are shot in a poetic mode.

Each day is introduced by an interstitial voice of god omniscient narration from Jean Rouch, providing a universalist thematic distance to the movie’s events. The film is bookended by a narration directed at both Petit Jules and the audience from Edward G. Robinson fondly looking back on his childhood in Niger and concluding that his life is worthy of his dreams.

== Filming ==
The filming process for Moi, un noir was rather idiosyncratic: Jean Rouch spent nine months amongst his ethnographic subjects and allowed them to tell their own story in a very personal way, inherently challenging the rules of the field.

Jean Rouch did not go into this film with any particular idea, preferring to capture as much footage as possible in order to structure a narrative with his subjects. Many sequences in the film were captured by chance during long continuous shots.

In making the movie, Jean Rouch was surprised as to how much his subjects were willing to disclose about their life’s dreams and aspirations, finding that his nimble camera offered him a passport into freedom, allowing him to navigate circles he hadn’t dreamt of integrating. Consequently, he brought his lightweight 16mm Kodachrome camera into every social setting.

After Jean Rouch and his subjects agreed that they had captured enough footage, they recorded the dialog in a studio in the Musée de l'Homme in Paris, France which he superimposed over ambient street noise recorded around Abidjan. These asynchronous sound effects born out of practical limitations helped contribute to the "dream-like" atmosphere of many sequences in the film.

== Historical context ==
This film was released in the midst of the Nigerien decolonization movement, and carries with it an arguably strong indictment of the pervasive nature of the icons of Western culture on the African psyche. The movie's editing juxtaposes African depictions of Western traits around Treichville with their pervasive influence on the subjects' dream lives. As a Frenchman, Jean Rouch was acutely aware of the heavy cultural weight placed upon him in capturing life for Nigerien immigrants.

== Criticism ==
While Jean Rouch let his African subjects present their own story, a number of his editing decisions remain controversial. He was accused of exploiting them and holding them under a microscope through his condescending camera lens. Furthermore, some of his collaborators found him too dictatorial in the editing process, in antithesis to his very open attitude while capturing footage. The editing decisions themselves also proved quite controversial. For instance, in the scene where Edward G. Robinson brags about his conquests with white women in Europe to Élite, the film cuts to shots of the sterns of ships registered in the ports that he name-checks (such as Oslo), corresponding to the shipments of sacks that they have just loaded in their menial jobs, suggesting that the character is being untruthful.

== Legacy ==
The film was received with much acclaim and is heralded as influential in launching the French New Wave movement. It was awarded the 1958 Louis Delluc Prize. Oumarou Ganda, who portrayed Edward G. Robinson in this film, went on to become one of Africa's seminal filmmakers. This film pioneered the use of evocative jump cuts and non-professional actors, two traits that Jean-Luc Godard would use to craft his film Breathless and shape the French New Wave. Godard argued that the film had reached "unprecedented levels of truth captured on film" in a March 1959 edition of the magazine Arts, and later ranked Moi, un Noir as his fourth favorite film of the year.

== See also ==
- Docufiction
- List of docufiction films
