= Man of Aran =

- US DVD cover
- Directed by: Robert J. Flaherty
- Written by: Robert J. Flaherty
- Produced by: Michael Balcon
- Starring: Colman 'Tiger' King; Maggie Dirrane; Michael Dirrane
- Cinematography: Robert J. Flaherty
- Edited by: John Goldman
- Music by: John D. H. Greenwood
- Production company: Gainsborough Pictures
- Distributed by: Gaumont British Distributors
- Release dates: 25 April 1934 (UK); 18 October 1934 (US)
- Running time: 76 minutes
- Country: United Kingdom
- Languages: Irish; English

Man of Aran is a 1934 Irish fictional documentary (ethnofiction) film shot, written and directed by Robert J. Flaherty about life on the Aran Islands off the western coast of Ireland. It portrays characters living in premodern conditions, documenting their daily routines such as fishing off high cliffs, farming potatoes where there is little soil, and hunting for huge basking sharks to get liver oil for lamps. Some situations are fabricated, such as one scene in which the shark fishermen are almost lost at sea in a sudden gale. Additionally, the family members shown are not actually related, having been chosen from among the islanders for their photogenic qualities.

George C. Stoney's 1978 documentary How the Myth was Made, which is included in the special features of the DVD, relates that the Aran Islanders had not hunted sharks in this way for over fifty years at the time the film was made. Man of Aran is Flaherty's recreation of culture on the edges of modern society, even though much of the primitive life depicted had been left behind by the 1930s. It is impressive, however, for its drama, for its spectacular cinematography of landscape and seascape, and for its concise editing.

== Synopsis ==
Man has to fight for his existence in the Aran Islands. Three men, among them "A Man of Aran", land a flimsy currach in the midst of high winds and huge waves with help from "His Wife" and "Their Son". The Man and his Wife work to make a field on the barren rocks using seaweed and soil scraped out of rock crevices. The Man fixes a hole in his boat with a mixture of cloth and tar. His Son sits on the edge of a cliff and uses a crab he caught earlier as bait to catch a fish in the water below.

The Man, working with four other fishermen in a slightly larger boat than before, harpoons a giant basking shark. They lose that one after a fight and later spend two days wearing another one down before they can bring it back to shore. The whole village comes down to the beach to either watch or to help drag the carcass out of the water. The Wife renders the shark's liver to get oil for the lamps on the island.

More sharks are still passing by on their migration, so the local fishermen head back out to sea, even though the weather looks like it might turn. No one will take the Son with them. There is a storm, and the Wife and Son can only watch from shore while the Man and his two shipmates struggle to get their boat to land safely against the elements. Everyone is reunited, but the Man's boat is crushed by the waves and rocks. The family turns and makes their way back to their cottage.

== Cast ==
- Colman 'Tiger' King as A Man of Aran
- Maggie Dirrane as His Wife
- Michael Dirrane as Their Son
- Pat Mullen as Shark Hunter
- Patch 'Red Beard' Ruadh as Shark Hunter
- Patcheen Faherty as Shark Hunter
- Tommy O'Rourke as Shark Hunter
- 'Big Patcheen' Conneely of the West as Canoeman
- Stephen Dirrane as Canoeman
- Pat McDonough as Canoeman

== Production ==
Stung by criticism that British films were flaccid imitations of those being produced in Hollywood, Michael Balcon of Gaumont British hired the acclaimed writer/director Robert Flaherty and his wife Frances (Nanook of the North (1922), Moana (1926), Elephant Boy (1937), The Land (1942), Louisiana Story (1948)) to prove the British film industry's cultural excellence as well as commercial success. In 1931, Robert Flaherty set up a studio and laboratory facilities on Inishmore, the largest of the three Aran Islands. Flaherty had promised Balcon he could shoot the entire film for £10,000. Over the next two years, he shot over 200,000 feet of film for a 74-minute documentary, oftentimes filming the same event time after time. As Flaherty says, "our films are made with film and time, I need lots of both." Balcon eventually called a halt to filming as the costs approached £40,000.

Like most 1930s documentaries, Man of Aran was shot as a silent film. The intermittent voices, the sound effects, and music are only accompaniments to the visuals and not considered integral to the production. Paul Rotha in Documentary Film says, "Man of Aran avoided all important issues raised by sound".

Flaherty continued to experiment with cinematography especially the long focal lens that he first used in Nanook. He used a variety of lens sizes, even a seventeen-inch long lens, which was twice the size of the camera. He used a spring driven camera that "was simpler in operation than any I have seen and not much heavier to carry than a portable typewriter".

== Release and initial reception ==
On 25 April 1934, Man of Aran premiered at the New Gallery in London. The screening had been preceded by a major publicity drive. A stuffed basking shark was put on display in the window of Gaumont British in Wardour Street, and Irish Guards played Irish folk music in the theater foyer on the first night. The islanders were brought over from Aran and paraded before the press and public in their simple homespun island garb. Man of Aran won top prize for the best foreign film at the 2nd Venice International Film Festival, the Mussolini Cup. During the first six months of its release the film grossed about £50,000; many films had grossed more, but according to Michael Balcon it brought Gaumont British the prestige he wanted.

When it opened in Dublin on 6 May 1934, Man of Aran was a major political and cultural event to the nascent Irish Free State and was attended by the President of the Executive Council, Éamon de Valera. The Irish government saw it as confirmation of their social and economic policies and so enthusiastically received the film. Man of Aran suited Fianna Fáil, as it encouraged an image of Ireland that was fiercely traditional, definitively rural, and resilient in the face of hardship.

The film's depiction of man's courage and repudiation of the intellect also appealed to the Nazis, who raved over it during the Berlin Festival in 1935. As Luke Gibbons has written, this portrayal of the harsh life on the west coast of Ireland was often taken to heart by those who viewed it.

Some critics believed Man of Aran socially irrelevant. Instead of returning with a film about Island poverty and an indictment of the absentee landlord, they claim Flaherty brought back a film about dewy-eyed urchins. Grierson argues that Flaherty's 'NeoRousseauism', the glorification of a simpler and more primitive way of life, meant he could not develop a form adequate to the more immediate material in the modern world. Paul Rotha faulted Man of Aran for its alleged avoidance of economic and social reality. At the time of Man of Aran's release, socialist critic Ralph Bond commented “…we are more concerned with what Flaherty has left out than with what he has put in…Flaherty would have us believe that there is no class struggle on Aran despite ample evidence to the contrary". It is claimed that Flaherty ignored the effects of such worldwide events as the depression of the 1930s, suggesting to the audience that the Aran Islands were isolated economically as they were geographically.

== Subsequent analysis and criticism ==
The current reputation of Man of Aran rests as much on controversies over truth and accuracy as on its aesthetic achievement. Some contend that Man of Aran is more valuable as a documentary of Robert Flaherty's vision of life than it is of life itself. Others see it as a betrayal of documentary's mission, "to tell it like it is". And yet, according to Richard Barsam, Flaherty is one of the great innovators of the documentary form...creating a nonfiction genre all of his own.

According to anthropologist John Messenger, there are over 100 factual errors in the film. Among the more notable is the shark-hunting sequence, which dominates the latter half of the story. Kimball says this practice had disappeared so long ago that the islanders did not know how to make or use the harpoons and had to be taught the skills of the hunt. Messenger, who visited Islands between 1958 and 1968, goes further, claiming that the islanders never had engaged in shark hunting then, or at any time in the past. Flaherty brought fishermen from Scotland to teach the locals how it is done. "Flaherty...created new customs, such as shark fishing, and seriously distorted numerous indigenous ones in order to make the Man of Aran fit his preconceptions and titillate the camera". Flaherty himself admits the shark fishing sequence was needed for the box-office.

However, the claim is not correct as whale and shark fishing were both known to occur and commercially viable operations up until a few years prior to the filming. Arranmore Whaling Co., 1908–1913; Blacksod Whaling Co., 1910–1914; and Akties Nordhavet Co.(Northern Seas)/Blacksod Whaling Co 1920–1922, may be adduced as evidence that it was a few years and not the hundreds claimed by some critiques. Only 11 years prior to filming, whaling was occurring on a commercial scale.

Other claims and controversies include the artificial creating of the Aran family out of unrelated cast members. They were handpicked by Flaherty to play the roles of mother, father, and son. In another sequence, Flaherty shows the mother buffeted by a storm as she carries seaweed along the Inishmore cliffs. What appears to be a traditional activity carried out by Aran women is a fabrication.The seaweed is collected for fertilization and is gathered from the low-lying shores twice per month, and only when the tides are absolutely calm. And Kimball points out that religion, which is rooted in the islanders lives, even among the locally recruited actors, is entirely absent. Flaherty also exposed the islanders to great risk, asking them to perform the most astonishing feats in stormy seas despite the fact none of the islanders could swim. As Flaherty says, "looking back I should have been shot for what I asked these superb people to do for the film...for the enormous risks...and all for the sake of a keg of porter and five pound a piece".

The full extent of Man of Aran's artifices was revealed at the 1978 Ethnographic Film Conference in Canberra, Australia. The conference had gathered, in part, to praise direct cinema which, in contrast to the classic tradition, promised a new level of realistic interpretation. This new form swept away staging and reconstruction to present a more accurate picture of the world. The debate was touched off by a screening of Flaherty’s Man of Aran followed by George Stoney’s just completed documentary exploration of Robert Flaherty’s Man of Aran, How the Myth Was Made, and the resulting exchange was "tumultuous". As James Roy MacBean says: "While appreciative of Flaherty’s poetic imagery [George Stoney] had popped the lid off all the distortions and omissions in Flaherty’s highly romanticized depiction of life on the Aran Islands". At the time, Stoney’s revelatory documentary had left many at the conference incensed at what they now saw as Flaherty’s blatant falsification of the life he had been purported to be documenting.

According to Barsam, "Flaherty’s subjective view of reality – his making it all up – has a romantic basis, idealizing the simple, natural even non-existent life". He argues that even though Flaherty habitually transforms reality, his essential achievement is that of the realist filmmaker. The idea of Flaherty as Romantic is shared by Aufderheide: "Flaherty had a powerful romantic belief in the purity of native cultures and he believed that his own culture was spiritually impoverished by comparison". Taken to the extreme, this approach makes no attempt to capture reality but create a romanticized picture of it: "The tragedy is that, being a poet, with a poet's eye, Flaherty’s lie is greater, for he can make romance seem real".

Aufderheide says, "documentary movies are about real life: they are not real life they are not even windows onto real life. They are portraits of real life, using real life as their raw material...You might then say: [a documentary] is a movie that does its best to represent real life and that doesn’t manipulate it...and yet, there is no way to make a film without manipulating the information. As Flaherty acknowledges, "one often has to distort a thing to catch its true spirit". How much a documentarian can manipulate and still credibly claim their film to be a truthful portrayal of real life "is a never-ending discussion with many answers".

Despite these controversies, Flaherty remains a pioneer of the documentary whose films are situated in a class of their own within the documentary genre. Kimball argues that Man of Aran never was intended to be an ethnographic documentary film. As he explains, "in a cosmic anthropological sense it could be counted as an artistic rendition of the struggle of man against nature". Flaherty had immersed himself in the culture to tell the essence of the truth about the Islanders, "[and] for this reason ethnographic accuracy is an unimportant consideration when the larger goal is some fundamental aspect of mankind". In Stoney’s film How the Myth Was Made, John Goldman, the editor on Man of Aran, is emphatic, "it was not a documentary, it was not intended to be a documentary...it was a piece of poetry". McNab calls it "not so much a conventional documentary as a poetic meditation". Arthur Calder-Marshall explains, "Flaherty wasn’t interested in actuality, he was interested in his own idea of life". If the film was intended to be a poetic statement instead of a factual documentary, one has no right to treat it as an ethnographic film now. Barsam asks, is it unreasonable for the artist to distill life over a period of time and deliver only the essence of it? Seen as the story of mankind over a thousand years, the story of Aran is this story of man against the sea...It is a simple story, but it is an essential story, for nothing emerges from time except bravery. Calder-Marshall suggests the controversies over Man of Aran could have been avoided if [Flaherty] had had a publicity adviser, someone as verbally agile as Grierson, who had made it publicly plain that Man of Aran was not a 'document' but an ‘eclogue’ – a pastoral and marine poem.

Brian Winston cautions against unconditionally praising Flaherty's poetic talent. He argues we have to acknowledge his manipulations and distortions because that is at the heart of understanding both his genius and his contribution to the documentary form. What Flaherty grasped was not only our desire for drama, but that it should arise from the life being observed and not imposed from without. By using drama and reconstruction, Flaherty created a unique form of documentary, which thrives between "a life as lived and life as narrativised".

== Artistic legacy ==
Richard Leacock, who went to school with Flaherty's daughters and later worked as the cinematographer on Louisiana Story, says that Flaherty taught him to concentrate on finding images: "You look, you search. You think of the image not merely as a way of showing something but also as a way of withholding information, of creating tension in the viewer. Of not revealing too much. Of seeing things with different perspectives by using different focal-length lenses". Flaherty says he owes almost everything to these long lenses and with them captured some of the most memorable sea footage ever recorded. Corliss says Man of Aran was very different from his earlier work, “…the chiaroscuro compositions, charcoal rock, black-clad figures against a gray sky, are light-years removed from the natural grandeur of Nanook of the North or the easy elegance of Moana. Corliss suggests there are enough similarities between Flaherty and John Ford, Chaplin, Borzage, even Disney that place him firmly in a tradition of the romantic visionary American. Winston sees the influence of Flaherty in Leni Riefenstahl films, arguing that her aesthetics of manipulation owed much to his pioneering work. McLoon goes further, suggesting "the cult of beauty, and fetishism of courage" in Man of Aran are the tropes of Fascism. He goes on to exonerate Flaherty of any Nazi connection saying "it is a measure of the apolitical nature of Flaherty’s vision that he was unaware of this problem inherent in his nineteenth-century primitive sensibility".

The Cripple of Inishmaan (1996) by Martin McDonagh is a play set on the Aran Islands at the time of the filming of Man of Aran.

The UK rock band Sea Power were asked to record a new soundtrack for the film's 2009 DVD release, performing the score at a series of live events in the UK including one accompanying the film itself at the British Film Institute.

Flaherty's legacy is the subject of the 2010 British Universities Film & Video Council award-winning and FOCAL International award-nominated documentary A Boatload of Wild Irishmen (so named because, after the staged climactic sequence of Man of Aran, Flaherty said he'd been accused of "trying to drown a boatload of wild Irishmen"), written by Professor Brian Winston of University of Lincoln, UK, and directed by Mac Dara Ó Curraidhín.

== See also ==
- Docufiction
- List of docufiction films
- Ethnofiction
- Pour la suite du monde, a 1962 film centred around the revival of an island whaling tradition abandoned circa 1920
