= Mortu Nega =

1988 film by Flora Gomes

- Film poster
- Directed by: Flora Gomes
- Screenplay by: Manuel Rambout Barcelos; Flora Gomes; David Lang
- Produced by: Instituto Nacional de Cinema da Guiné-Bissau
- Starring: Bia Gomez; Tunu Eugenio Almada; Mamadu Uri Balde
- Cinematography: Dominique Gentil
- Edited by: Christiane Lack
- Music by: Djanun Dabo; Sidonio Pais Cuaresma
- Release date: August 29, 1988
- Running time: 85'
- Country: Guinea-Bissau
- Language: Crioulo

Mortu Nega (English: Death Denied or Those Whom Death Refused) is a 1988 historic film by Flora Gomes, a director from Guinea-Bissau. Mortu Nega was Gomes' first feature-length film and the first film produced in independent Guinea-Bissau. It was also the first ethnofiction film to show the experiences of the Guinea-Bissau War of Independence, blending contemporary history with mythology. Its world premiere was at the Venice Film Festival on August 29, 1988.

== Synopsis ==
1973: Diminga accompanies a group of camouflaged soldiers who travel down a path, in the middle of the shrubland, carrying supplies to a war front near Conakry, where Diminga's husband Sako is fighting. The country is ruined and there is death everywhere, but hope is what keeps life worth living. In the encampment where she meets Sako, Diminga does not have much time to enjoy his company. The rebels are gaining ground and they are certain that they will command victory.

1974–77: The end of the war, but not truly an end. There is a great drought across the country and life continues to be difficult. It is true that where Diminga lives, in between the crying, there are great celebrations for the end of the war. But the drought continues, Diminga has a sick husband and other fighting (mostly over rations) starts.

The film, in the words of its director, is an African parable. The colonies won their independence and eliminated Portuguese colonialism. A question that arises is about Africa's future. As Flora Gomes suggests, Africa cannot be itself without its beliefs, its myths, its philosophy, and its culture.

== Interpretation ==
The year the film premiered, 1988 "not only marks the 25th anniversary of the independence of Guinea-Bissau and the assassination of its leader Amílcar Cabral, it is also the year in which the country was practically annihilated by a brutal civil war” (Teresa Ribeiro, a journalist for Voice of America). The film is an “elegy, not for the victims of the war of liberation, but for its survivors."

Mortu Nega has become a cult film seen as having “no ideologies or morals. It is a love story: nervous, carnal, sensitive” (René Marx, Pariscope, March 14, 1990).

== Cast ==
- Bia Gomes as Diminga
- Tunu Eugenio Almada as Sako
- Mamadu Uri Balde as Sanabaio
- M'Make Nhasse as Lebeth
- Sinho Pedro DaSilva as Estin
- Homma Nalete as Mandembo
- Caio Leucadio Almeida as Onkono
- Brinsam as Irene Lopes
- Abi Cassama as Nurse
- Ernesto Moreira as Doctor
- Flora Gomes as Head of Sector

== Technical information ==
- Script – Flora Gomes, Manuel Rambault Barcellos, and David Lang
- Production – National Film Institute of Guinea-Bissau
- Producers – Cecília Fonseca, Odette Rosa, Nina Neves Aimée and Jacques Zajdermann
- Photography – Dominique Gentil
- Editing – Christiane Lack
- Format – 35 mm film
- Genre – historical docufiction, ethnofiction
- Duration – 92 minutes
- Distribution – California Newsreel

== Festivals and Shows ==
- 1988 – Venice Film Festival, August 29 (2 Honorable Mentions)
- 1989 – Panafrican Film and Television Festival of Ouagadougou (FESPACO), March
- 1989 – Cannes Film Festival, May 16
- 1989 – Belgian Cinedecouvertes, July
- 1989 – London Film Festival – November 16–20
- 1990 – Seattle International Film Festival – May 28
- 1990 – Journées Cinématographiques de Carthage (French), Tunis, October – November (bronze Tanit award)
- 1997 – 9th Annual Cascade Festival of African Films, February 20
- 2000 – New York Film Center, June 20
- 2000 – African Film Festival, November 26
- 2003 – Flora Gomes Retrospective and African Film Festival at Brown University

== See also ==
- Docufiction
- List of docufiction films

- Cinema of Portugal
- African Cinema
