= Simone Rapisarda Casanova =

Italian experimental filmmaker (born 1970)

- Born: Catania, Italy
- Citizenship: Canadian
- Occupation: Filmmaker
- Known for: Winner of the Best Emerging Director award, Locarno Film Festival 2014, Switzerland
- Notable work: The Strawberry Tree (2011), The Creation of Meaning (2014)

Simone Rapisarda Casanova is an Italian experimental filmmaker currently living in Canada. In 2014, he won the Leopard for Best Emerging Director at the Locarno International Film Festival.

== Life ==
Rapisarda Casanova was born in Catania, Italy. He developed an interest in photography and cinema while studying Computer Science at the University of Pisa. Soon after moving to Canada in 2000, he abandoned his career in the software industry to devote himself to studying film, first in Montreal and later in Toronto.

He is both an active filmmaker and a teacher (York University, Wilfrid Laurier University, Ciné Institute). He is currently a professor of film at Simon Fraser University's School for the Contemporary Arts.

== Filmography ==
Blending documentary and fiction, Rapisarda Casanova’s experimental films are the result of a process-driven approach in which the filmmaker, eschewing screenwriting and production-planning, personally tackles all aspects of preproduction, production and postproduction. His style is marked by an oneiric approach to storytelling, long takes, fixed camera positions, and the choice of non-actors who improvise on a loose outline. The filmmaker only shoots one take for each scene and, at a later stage, chooses and assembles only what seems to evoke the most intimate essence of characters and places. Metacinematic narratives, diegetic soundscapes, low-angle shots and the extensive use of wide-angle and ultra wide-angle lenses are other trademarks of his style. Those stylistical choices are driven by multiple intents: to explore the boundaries of the medium, to make the spectator aware of cinematic artificiality, and to question the ethics of Western ethnographic filmmmaking.

=== El árbol de las fresas (The Strawberry Tree) ===
(Canada/Cuba/Italy, 2011, 71 min) The first feature-length film by the author is an experimental ethnography that captures the last days of the village of Juan Antonio, Cuba, shortly before hurricane Ike wiped it out. The film was included in Film Comment’s list of the “Fifty Best Undistributed Films of 2012.”

=== La creazione di significato (The Creation of Meaning) ===
(Italy/Canada, 2014, 90 min) An aging but tenacious Tuscan shepherd, Pacifico Pieruccioni, is forced by the economic crisis to give up the house and land where his parents had fought in the Resistance against the German Army during World War II. Oddly enough, the prospective buyer is a young German. The shepherd and the prospective buyer start a conversation about history and present-day Italy. The film won the Best Emerging Director award at the Locarno International Film Festival in 2014 and received a weeklong theatrical release at the Museum of Modern Art in 2015.

=== Zanj Hegel la (Hegel's Angel) ===
(Canada/Haiti/Italy/United States, 2018, 70 min) The film captures the daily life of a boy named Widley in contemporary Haiti, as it unfolds between mundane activities, mystic presences, the turmoil caused by upcoming elections, and his interest for the making of a weird film. With this film Rapisarda's research moves further into experimental ethnofiction following the shared ethnography path opened by Jean Rouch.

=== In the Garden of Forking Paths ===
(Canada, 2021, 70 min) Experimental ethnography directed by Rapisarda and Dara Culhane in collaboration with the communities of ‘Yalis (Alert Bay) and Wei Wai Kum (Campbell River) in Kwakwaka'wakw Nation, Xwesam (Roberts Creek) in Shíshálh and Skwxwú7mesh territories, Klah ah men (Lund) in Tla'amin territory, all in British Columbia. Just before conditions on Planet Earth became unsuitable for human life, a small group of children received a message from a faraway galaxy: an ancient civilisation plea for notes describing life on Planet Earth. The film is composed of the imaginary remains of those notes.

== See also ==
- Avant-garde
- Art film
- List of directors associated with art film
- Docufiction
- Ethnofiction
- Soundscape
