= Giorgio John Squarcia =

American director, screenwriter, writer, producer, and investigative journalist

Giorgio J. Squarcia
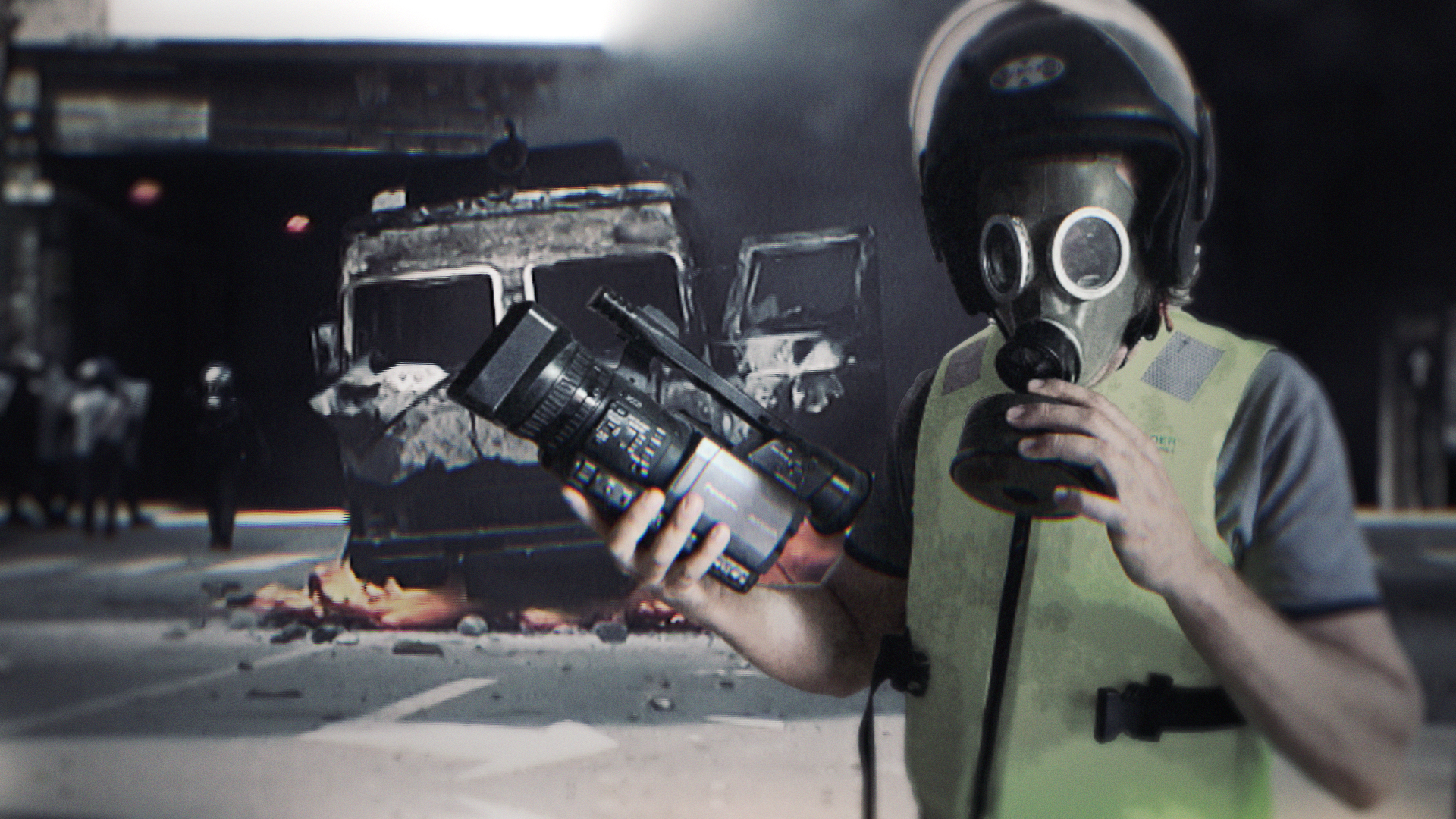
- Giorgio J. Squarcia at the G8 in Genoa
- Born: Giorgio John Squarcia; September 2, 1969 (age 57); Rochester, Minnesota, USA
- Other names: GJ Squarcia; Giorgio J. Squarcia
- Occupations: Director, screenwriter, writer, producer, investigative journalist
- Years active: 1994–present
- Known for: Tutto in un Giorno, "I giorni dell'Odio", "Cash", "Lo Stato Social", Miss Italia
- Website: gjsquarcia.com

Giorgio John Squarcia (also known as GJ Squarcia and Giorgio J. Squarcia; born September 2, 1969), is an American director, screenwriter, writer, producer, and investigative journalist. Since 2001, beginning with the anthology television series Tutto in un Giorno, he has created and directed projects that combine journalistic investigation with cinematic storytelling. His later productions includes the true crime film Erba – I giorni dell'odio (2007), the docu-series Cash (2009), and other titles such as Lo Stato Sociale, The Last Exorcist, and Red Zone Forever. Through these projects he explored real-life events with a dramatized cinematic approach that anticipated the later popularity of the true crime and docudrama genres.

== Biography ==
=== Early career ===
After earning a master's degree in screenwriting and directing from New York University, Squarcia began his career as an investigative journalist for the newsmagazines Inside Edition and American Journal, broadcast on NBC and CBS. Following an investigation into illegal casinos in New York, Squarcia was forced to leave the United States and return to his parents' homeland, Italy, to avoid retaliation.

=== TV Series, Films, and Documentaries ===
In 2001, Squarcia created Tutto in un Giorno ("All in One Day"), an anthology TV series that tells a socially relevant event (the first episode is set during the 27th G8 summit) through the actions of four protagonists as different as possible from one another, who play themselves over the course of the same day The series introduced the split-screen technique as a narrative tool, creating a parallel montage that allowed the audience to experience multiple perspectives of the same day simultaneously. Tutto in un Giorno won the ANART Award (National Association of Radio, Television and Theatre Authors) in 2002 for Best Production of the Year, with the following motivation: "A decidedly original work in terms of content and stylistic choices, with high-quality writing."

In 2007, he wrote and directed the film Erba, i giorni dell'odio (Erba, In cold blood). In a quiet Italian town, a shocking quadruple murder leads to the unexpected confession of an ordinary couple, unraveling a chilling true story where truth, media, and justice collide. For the first time, a film about an ongoing true crime case was aired in prime time on Canale 5. Considered the first example of a true crime film in Italy, it attracted a large audience but divided critics. In 2008, Giorgio John Squarcia produced, wrote, and directed the docuseries Cash, viaggio di una banconota ("Cash: Journey of a Banknote"), an eight-episode miniseries that follows the path of two ten-euro banknotes, named Romeo and Juliet, as they change hands throughout Italy, revealing real-life stories, social differences, and Italians' relationship with money.

In 2018, Giorgio John Squarcia created Lo Stato Social ("The Social State") for Sky Atlantic, a documentary that analyzes the crucial role of social media in Italian politics. In 2019, he wrote and directed the documentary L'ultimo esorcista ("The Last Exorcist").

In 2020, he wrote Zona rossa sempre ("Red Zone Forever"), a six-episode TV series that tells the story of a day in six Italian prisons through the eyes of their chaplains. In 2021, on the occasion of the anniversary of the 27th G8 summit, he wrote and directed La sottile zona rossa ("The Thin Red Zone", Sky Documentaries), a collective work that revisits those dramatic days from multiple perspectives, through the footage of ten filmmakers from different countries.

In 2023, Squarcia traveled across the United States with singer Cesare Cremonini. The images from the trip became the documentary Alaska Baby, released in December 2024 on Disney+, written by Squarcia himself. In 2024, to mark the 30th anniversary of Ayrton Senna's death, Squarcia wrote Io & Ayrton, a monologue-event and documentary performed by actor Stefano Fresi. The work, which combines narration, live music, and exclusive projections, was premiered on May 1, 2024, at the Imola circuit, in the very place where Ayrton Senna started his final Formula 1 lap.

In 2026, he created the three-part documentary series Senna: The Legacy, produced by Inside Man Films in partnership with Yap Films. The series was commissioned by Discovery Latin America and Bell Media/Crave, with international distribution handled by Cineflix Rights.

=== Other Projects ===
In 2013, he wrote and directed Le strade di Max, a TV series starring singer Max Pezzali.

In 2016, he wrote and directed the documentary Il Ballo del Doge – A Venetian Dream for Sky Arte.

Also in 2016, he wrote and directed the documentary Art Basel Miami for Sky Arte.

In 2020, he wrote and directed the docuseries On the Road Again.

In 2022, Squarcia created Italiani Fantastici e Dove Trovarli ("Fantastic Italians and Where to Find Them") for Rai 2, a TV show that uses social experiments, satirical provocations, and interviews to explore the character, contradictions, and virtues of the Italian people.

In 2021, he was appointed creative director of the Miss Italia beauty pageant. Squarcia introduced radical changes: The removal of sashes and contestant numbers, shifting the focus from standardized beauty to the personality of the participants. Talent-show-style challenges to highlight the artistic and communication skills of the competitors. Social experiments with hidden cameras to observe the contestants' reactions in unexpected situations, offering the audience a glimpse of their authenticity. A new role for eliminated finalists, who, for the first time in the history of the competition, were included in the jury.

Alongside the transformation of the pageant, Squarcia created a TV series titled Crown Revolution, shot in docu-reality style. The show documented the contestants' preparation for the competition, highlighting their personal growth and behind-the-scenes dynamics.

From 2001 to 2022, Squarcia wrote and directed over 300 pranks for the Italian TV shows Scherzi a Parte and Le Iene.

== Style and Recurring Themes ==
Thanks to his background in investigative journalism combined with his cinematic training, since 2001 with Tutto in un Giorno, Squarcia began experimenting with a hybrid language that merges real-world investigation with cinematic storytelling techniques.

His later works—I Giorni dell'Odio, Cash, Lo Stato Social, L'Ultimo Esorcista, La Sottile Zona Rossa, Zona Rossa Sempre—all based on true stories, retained the same stylistic signature, introducing elements of cinematic narration into the telling of reality.

== Filmography ==
=== Director ===
- Europa – RAI 3 (1999)
- Il Diario – Italia 1 (2003)
- Tutto in un Giorno – Italia 1 (2001–2002)
- Scherzi a Parte – Canale 5 (2002–2022)
- Matrix – Canale 5 (2007)
- I giorni dell'odio – Canale 5 (2007)
- Cash – Viaggio di una banconota – All Music (2008)
- Jonathan – Sulle tracce dell'avventura – Iris (2007–2010)
- 24/7 – Deejay TV (2011)
- I Guastanozze – Italia 1 (2012–2013)
- Lucignolo – Italia 1 (2013–2014)
- Le strade di Max – Deejay TV (2013–2014)
- Il Ballo del Doge – A Venetian Dream – Sky Arte (2016)
- Miami Beach – Un giorno ad Art Basel – Sky Arte (2016)
- Striscia la Notizia – Canale 5 (2016)
- Lo Scherzo Perfetto – Italia 1 (2017)
- Lo Stato Social – Sky Atlantic (2018)
- Le Iene – Italia 1 (2018–2022)
- On the Road Again – Sky (2020–2021)
- L'Ultimo Esorcista – Discovery (2019)
- Zona Rossa Sempre – TV2000 (2020)
- Off the Road – Sky (2020–2021)
- La Sottile Zona Rossa – Sky Documentaries (2021)
- Miss Italia Crown Revolution - helbiz (2021)
- Italiani Fantastici e dove trovarli – Rai 2 (2022)
- Dagli Appennini alle onde – Sky (2023)
- The Passenger – Sky (2022)
- Scappo dalla Città – Sky (2022)
- La Formula Vincente - Sky (2023)
- Io & Ayrton – Sky (2024)

=== Screenwriter ===
- Europa – RAI 3 (1999)
- Fuego – Italia 1 (2000)
- Il Diario – Italia 1 (2003)
- Link – Italia 1
- Tutto in un Giorno – Italia 1 (2001–2002)
- Scherzi a Parte – Canale 5 (2002–2022)
- Matrix – Canale 5 (2007)
- Erba, I giorni dell'odio – Canale 5 (2007)
- Cash – Viaggio di una banconota – All Music (2008)
- Sognando Italia – Rete 4
- Jonathan – Sulle tracce dell'avventura – Mediaset - (2007–2010)
- 24/7 – Deejay TV (2011)
- I Guastanozze – Italia 1 (2012–2013)
- Lucignolo – Italia 1 (2013–2014)
- Le strade di Max – Deejay TV (2013–2014)
- Il Ballo del Doge – A Venetian Dream – Sky Arte (2016)
- Miami Beach – Un giorno ad Art Basel – Sky Arte (2016)
- Striscia la Notizia – Canale 5 (2016)
- Lo Scherzo Perfetto – Italia 1 (2017)
- Lo Stato Social – Sky Atlantic (2018)
- Le Iene – Italia 1 (2018–2022)
- On the Road Again – Sky (2020–2021)
- L'Ultimo Esorcista – Discovery (2019)
- Zona Rossa Sempre – TV2000 (2020)
- Off the Road – Sky (2020–2021)
- La Sottile Zona Rossa – Sky Documentaries (2021)
- Miss Italia – Crown Revolution (2021)
- Italiani Fantastici e dove trovarli – Rai 2 (2022)
- Dagli Appennini alle onde – Sky (2023)
- The Passenger – Sky (2022)
- Scappo dalla Città – Sky (2022)
- La Formula Vincente - Sky (2023)
- Alaska Baby – Disney+ (2024)
- Io & Ayrton – Sky (2024)

=== Producer ===
- Tutto in un Giorno – Italia 1 (2001–2002)
- I giorni dell'odio – Canale 5 (2007)
- Il Ballo del Doge – A Venetian Dream – Sky Arte (2016)
- Miami Beach – A Day at Art Basel – Sky Arte (2016)
- Lo Stato Social – Sky Atlantic (2018)
- On the Road Again – Sky (2020–2021)
- L'Ultimo Esorcista – Discovery (2019)
- Zona Rossa Sempre – TV2000 (2020)
- Off the Road – Sky (2020–2021)
- La Sottile Zona Rossa – Sky Documentaries (2021)
- Miss Italia – Crown Revolution (2021)
- Fantastic Italians and Where to Find Them – Rai 2 (2022)
- Dagli Appennini alle onde – Sky (2023)
- The Passenger – Sky (2022)
- Scappo dalla Città – Sky (2022)
- La Formula Vincente - Sky (2023)
- Alaska Baby – Disney+ (2024)
- Io & Ayrton – Sky (2024)

=== Music Videos ===
- Nessuno vuole essere Robin – Cesare Cremonini (2018)
- Al telefono – Cesare Cremonini (2019)
- Ciao – Cesare Cremonini (2020)

=== Advertising ===
- Nescafé – Digital Campaign (2018)
- Samsung – World Campaign

== Books ==
=== Wasteland ===
In 2017, Giorgio J. Squarcia published the novel Wasteland.

=== Perdere Senna ===
In 2024, the publishing house PaperFIRST acquired the rights to the monologue Io & Ayrton and published the novel Perdere Senna. The book launched the publisher's new "Pop" collection.

== Awards ==
- 2002 – Anart Award (National Association of Radio, Television and Theater Authors) for Tutto in un Giorno, awarded Best Program of the Year.
- 2012 – Ideona Prize for Le strade di Max, Best Program of the Year.
- 2024 – Guirlande d'Honneur for Io & Ayrton.
