= Ala-Arriba! (film) =

1942 film

- Directed by: José Leitão de Barros
- Written by: Alfredo Cortez; Augusto de Santa-Ritta (poems)
- Produced by: Tobis Portuguesa
- Starring: Domingos Gonçalves; Elsa Bela-Flor; Luís Pinto; Maria Mesquita (Olguim); Madalena Vilaça
- Music by: Ruy Coelho
- Distributed by: Internacional Filmes; Sonoro Filme
- Release date: September 15, 1942
- Running time: 84 minutes
- Language: Portuguese

Ala-Arriba! is a 1942 Portuguese romantic docufiction set in Póvoa de Varzim, a traditional Portuguese fishing town.

Dealing with ethnographic matters, it may be considered as an ethnofiction. The film was directed by Leitão de Barros, and stars real fishermen as themselves in order to give a realistic view over traditions and social behaviours of the community. Focusing the cultural context, it continuously shifts from documentary to drama, by means of a fictional narrative. Contemporary to Robert Flaherty, Barros is with him one of the first filmmakers to explore docufiction and ethnofiction as forms of dramatic narrative.

It premiered at São Luis Theatre in Lisbon.

== Synopsis ==
It focuses on maritime tragedy of the town and a forbidden love between Julha (Elsa Bela-Flor) and João Moço (Domingos Gonçalves), from different fisher castes, in a community where mixed-caste marriages were not allowed and dating without parent's assent was seen as a disgrace to the family, not only in respect to women, but also men.

== Historical background ==
The script of Ala-Arriba! was written by the prestigious Alfredo Cortez, based on the book O Poveiro by António dos Santos Graça, focusing the cultural aspects of the town.

The film was financed by SPN (Secretariado da Propaganda Nacional – National Propaganda Bureau) of the Ministério das Obras Públicas (Ministry of Public Works) during the Estado Novo period. The town was seen, by the regime, as an example of Portuguese culture.

== Festivals ==
- Venice Film Festival - Award The Biennale Cup (1942)

NOTE: Ala-Arriba! was the first Portuguese film to win at this festival an international award

== See also ==
- Docufiction
- List of docufiction films
- Ethnofiction
