= The Human Pyramid (1899 film) =

- Directed by: Georges Méliès
- Starring: Georges Méliès
- Production company: Star Film Company
- Release date: 1899
- Running time: 1 minute
- Country: France
- Language: Silent

The Human Pyramid (French: La Pyramide de Triboulet, "Triboulet's Pyramid") is an 1899 French silent trick film by Georges Méliès.

== Plot ==
In an ornate room, the jester Triboulet magically summons nine men from a trunk, seats them in levels forming a pyramid, and turns them into women in court dress.

== Release ==
Méliès acts in the film as Triboulet, famously the jester for the French kings Louis XII and Francis I. He made another film featuring Triboulet, The King and the Jester, in 1907. The Human Pyramid was sold by Méliès's Star Film Company and is numbered 218 in its catalogues, where it was advertised as a tableau sensationnel pour coloris ("a sensational scene for hand-coloring").

Méliès burned all the surviving original camera negatives of his films toward the end of his life, and about three-fifths of his output is presumed lost. The Human Pyramid was among the lost films until 2007, when a copy was identified and restored by the Filmoteca de Catalunya.
