= Marie-Josèphe Yoyotte =

French film/television editor and actress

- Born: 5 November 1929; Saint-Fons, France
- Died: 17 July 2017 (aged 87)
- Occupation: Film editor

Marie-Josèphe Yoyotte (5 November 1929 – 17 July 2017) was a French film and television editor and actress. Her extensive editing credits include The 400 Blows, Winged Migration and Microcosmos, the latter of which garnered Yoyotte a César Award for Best Editing.

== Filmography ==
Year	Title	Director	Box office	Notes
1957	Love in Jamaica	André Berthomieu	$19,958,182	
1958	Moi, un noir	Jean Rouch	/	
1959	The 400 Blows	François Truffaut	$30,697,275	
1960	Testament of Orpheus	Jean Cocteau	/	
1960	The Fenouillard Family	Yves Robert	$10,315,245	
1961	La pyramide humaine	Jean Rouch (2)	/	
1961	Léon Morin, Priest	Jean-Pierre Melville	$12,771,450	
1962	War of the Buttons	Yves Robert (2)	$74,522,932	
1962	Le Signe du Lion	Éric Rohmer	/	
