= Welcome to Canada =

- Directed by: John N. Smith
- Written by: John N. Smith; Sam Grana
- Produced by: Sam Grana
- Cinematography: David De Volpi; Roger Martin; K. Shanmuganathan; Martin Duckworth
- Edited by: John N. Smith; Martial Éthier; Sam Grana
- Production company: National Film Board of Canada
- Release date: 1989
- Running time: 86 minutes
- Country: Canada
- Language: English

Welcome to Canada is a 1989 Canadian docufiction film directed by John N. Smith. Loosely based on a real-life incident, the film depicts the interactions of a small community in Newfoundland with a group of Sri Lankan Tamil refugees who turn up in the town. The film's cast includes Charlene Bruff, Madonna Hawkins, Nirmalan Masilamany, Anandprasad Pathanjali, Beverly Power, Francis Power, Rosie Power, Kumar Singam Nadarajah, Murugesu Sivanesan, and Sinnakili Baskaran.

The film premiered at the Montreal World Film Festival in 1989, and was screened at the 1989 Toronto International Film Festival.

Smith received a Genie Award nomination for Best Director at the 11th Genie Awards in 1990.
