= The Human Pyramid (1961 film) =

- French: La Pyramide humaine
- Directed by: Jean Rouch
- Written by: Jean Rouch
- Produced by: Pierre Braunberger
- Cinematography: Louis Miaille; Roger Morillière; Jean Rouch
- Edited by: Geneviève Bastid; Marie-Josèphe Yoyotte
- Production company: Les Films de la Pléiade
- Release date: April 19, 1961
- Running time: 90 minutes
- Country: Ivory Coast
- Language: French

The Human Pyramid (French: La Pyramide humaine) is a 1961 Ivorian docufiction film directed by Jean Rouch. He cast black African and white French students to improvise interactions with each other at an integrated high school in Abidjan.

== Plot ==
Rouch took the title of his film from a poem by the Surrealist Paul Eluard. In Abidjan in newly-independent Ivory Coast, the film sees a mixed-race lycée class in which the filmmaker asks why white and black students do not mix together socially after class. They are interviewed separately and together, and are shown in their home environments and meeting together socially. They also improvise scenes of fantasized events. Racial tensions intensify when a new female student from Paris starts dating an African student. The film is both ethnofiction and a documentary account of making ethnofiction: counterposed to the main plot of the relation between the two racial groups is a subplot, which is the effect on the student actors of the making of the film itself.

== Production ==
La Pyramide humaine was made on 16 mm Eastmancolor film in a 1.37:1 aspect ratio. The production of La pyramide humaine, between summer 1959 and spring 1960, coincided with the climax of independence movements across French-speaking Africa; 15 African colonies claimed independence from France between September 1958 and October 1960.

== Reception ==
The film was banned by colonial authorities through most of Francophone Africa.

Richard I. Suchenski notes that by ending the film with the suicide of one of the students, "Rouch forces the viewers to re-evaluate what they have just seen, drawing attention both to the inevitable presence of fictional tendencies within even the most uncontrolled filmmaking situation".

François Truffaut places La Pyramide humaine among a group of films that "correspond to the new novel and those that aspire to be sociological documents or testimonies".
