= Criminals Gone Wild =

- Directed by: Ousala Aleem
- Produced by: Ousala Aleem; Ali Aleem
- Cinematography: Ousala Aleem
- Edited by: Ousala Aleem
- Distributed by: MVD Entertainment Group
- Release date: April 22, 2008
- Running time: 77 minutes
- Country: United States
- Language: English

Criminals Gone Wild is a documentary film directed and produced by Ousala Aleem through his Brooklyn-based media studio FD Entertainment.

== Content ==
The film chronicles the lives of several alleged criminals on rampages of crime sprees of robberies, assaults, carjacks and murders. The film caused much controversy in the news media over the authenticity of the crimes filmed.

== Production ==
The film was originally released and distributed by Aleem in November 2007. The film was later distributed nationally through MVD.

== Distribution ==
All standard copies of Criminals Gone Wild originally sold for $24.99. A deluxe edition was sold for $80 named the "crime pack combo" which included a copy of Grand Theft Auto IV for whatever console the buyer chooses.

Amazon stopped selling the DVD and YouTube took down the film's trailer.

== Sequel ==
A sequel called Criminals Gone Wild 2: Menace to Humanity was filmed and planned to be released in 2009 but was cancelled due to piracy and legal concerns. The film was re-cut and released in September 2018.
