= José Leitão de Barros =

Portuguese film director and playwright (1896–1967)

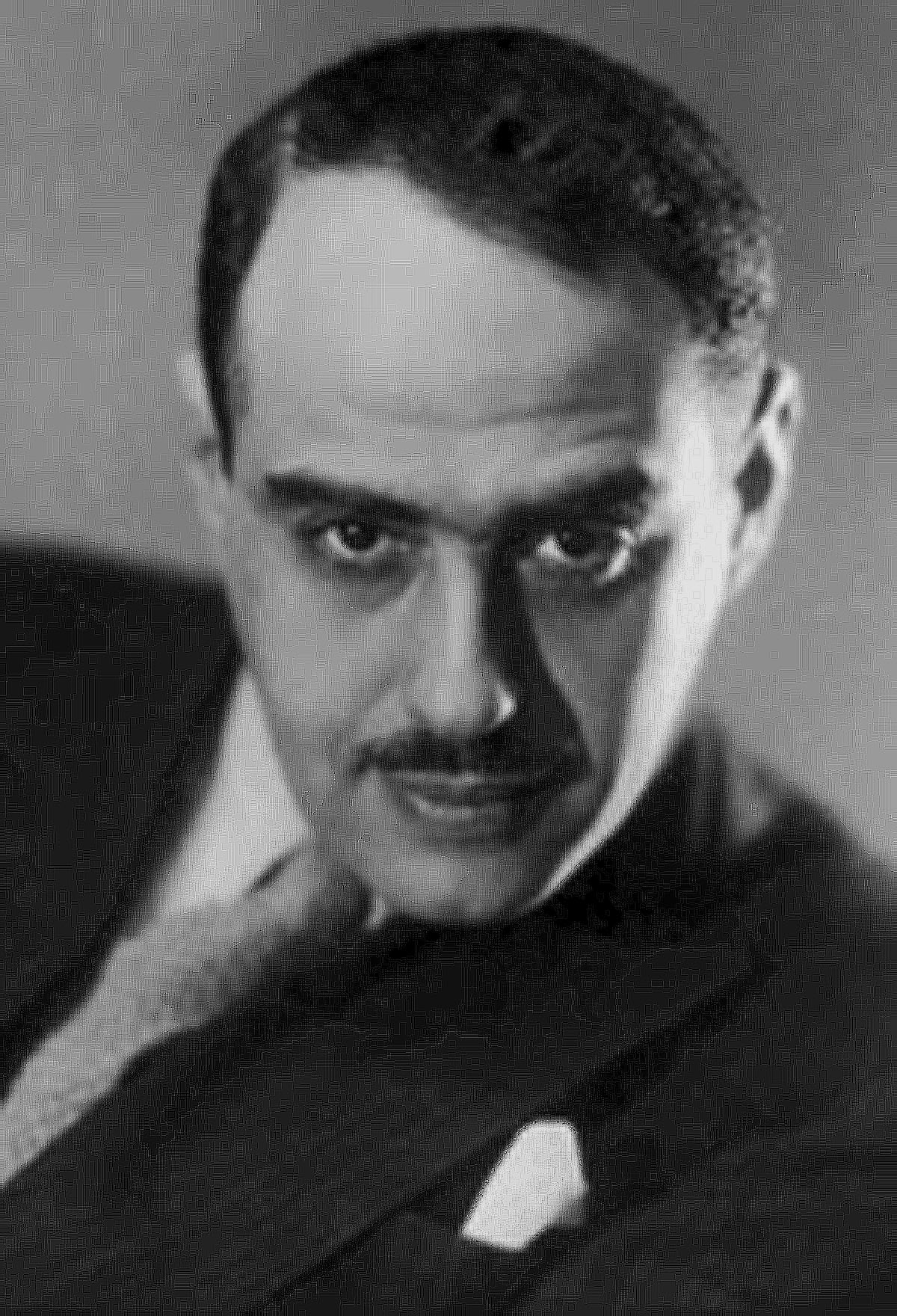
- Leitão de Barros
- Born: José Júlio Marques Leitão de Barros; 22 October 1896; Lisbon, Portugal
- Died: 29 June 1967 (aged 70); Lisbon, Portugal
- Occupation(s): Film director, playwright

José Júlio Marques Leitão de Barros (22 October 1896 – 29 June 1967) was a Portuguese film director and playwright.

== Career ==
Among his most famous films are Maria do Mar (1930), the second docufiction after Moana (1926) by Robert Flaherty, the first Portuguese sound film, A Severa (1931), Ala-Arriba! (1945), and a biopic about Portugal's national poet, Camões (1946).

He was born and died in Lisbon.

== Filmography ==
- Mal de Espanha (1918)
- O Homem dos Olhos Tortos (1918) (unfinished)
- Malmequer (1918)
- Sidónio Pais - Proclamação do Presidente da República (1918) (lost)
- Nazaré, Praia de Pescadores (1929) (the second part is lost)
- Festas da Curia (1927)
- Lisboa, Crónica Anedótica (1930)
- Maria do Mar (1930)
- A Severa (1931)
- As Pupilas do Senhor Reitor (1935)
- Bocage (1936)
- Las Tres Gracias (1936)
- Maria Papoila (1937)
- Legião Portuguesa (1937)
- Mocidade Portuguesa (1937)
- Varanda dos Rouxinóis (1939)
- A Pesca do Atum (1939)
- Ala-Arriba! (1942)
- A Póvoa de Varzim (1942)
- Inês de Castro (1944)
- Camões (1946)
- Vendaval Maravilhoso (1949)
- Comemorações Henriquinas (1960)
- A Ponte da Arrábida Sobre o Rio Douro (1961)
- Escolas de Portugal (1962)
- A Ponte Salazar Sobre o Rio Tejo (1966)

== See also ==
- Docufiction
- Ethnofiction
- Cinema of Portugal
- José de Matos-Cruz - Portuguese film historian
