= Tutto in un Giorno =

Italian anthology TV series

- Genre: Documentary Film
- Created by: Giorgio John Squarcia
- Showrunner: Giorgio John Squarcia
- Directed by: Giorgio John Squarcia
- Country of origin: Italy
- Original language: Italian
- No. of seasons: 1
- No. of episodes: 5

Production
- Running time: 60 min
- Production company: Inside Man Films

Original release
- Network: Italia 1
- Release: 2001 – 2002

Tutto in un giorno is an anthology television series that explores socially significant events—beginning with the 27th G8 summit—through the interconnected narratives of four distinct protagonists. Each episode unfolds over the course of a single day, with the characters portraying themselves in dramatized reenactments of real experiences.

The series is known for being the first instance in which Italian television experimented with a storytelling language that merges reality investigation with cinematic techniques.

The series introduced split-screen as a narrative tool, creating a parallel montage that allowed the audience to experience multiple perspectives of the same day simultaneously.

With its self-playing protagonists, fast-paced editing, and three-act structure, the show laid the foundation for a new genre blending information and entertainment.

== Awards ==
In 2002, Tutto in un Giorno won the ANART Prize (National Association of Radio, Television, and Theater Authors) for Best Production of the Year, with the following citation: "A truly original work for its content and stylistic solutions, with high-quality writing."

== Episodes ==
The episodes of the series include:

- Red zone under attack
- Behind bars
- Voices
- Capital-game: Lazio vs Roma derby
- The last fight
