= Trevico-Turin: Voyage in Fiatnam =

- Directed by: Ettore Scola
- Written by: Ettore Scola; Diego Novelli
- Starring: Paolo Turco
- Cinematography: Claudio Cirillo
- Edited by: Raimondo Crociani
- Music by: Benedetto Ghiglia
- Release date: 1973
- Language: Italian

Trevico-Turin: Voyage in Fiatnam (Italian: Trevico-Torino - Viaggio nel Fiat-Nam) is a 1973 Italian drama film, a docufiction written and directed by Ettore Scola. It is a realistic description of the difficult living conditions of Fiat workers who emigrated from South Italy.

The film blends documentary and fictional cinema, and was funded and produced by Unitelefilm, the film production company of the Italian Communist Party.

== Plot ==
From Trevico in the province of Avellino, a young man arrives in Turin to work at Fiat. Once hired, he will face harsh experiences as an immigrant and a worker.

== Cast ==
- Paolo Turco as Fortunato Santospirito
- Vittoria Franzinetti as Vicky
- Vittorio Franzinetti
- Stefania Casini

== See also ==
- List of Italian films of 1973
- Docufiction
