= Trás-os-Montes (film) =

- Directed by: António Reis; Margarida Cordeiro
- Screenplay by: António Reis; Margarida Cordeiro
- Produced by: Pedro Paulo
- Starring: The inhabitants of Trás-os-Montes
- Cinematography: Acácio de Almeida
- Edited by: António Reis; Margarida Cordeiro
- Production company: Centro Português de Cinema (CPC)
- Release date: 11 June 1976 (Lisbon)
- Running time: 111 minutes
- Country: Portugal
- Language: Portuguese

Trás-os-Montes is a Portuguese independent docufictional and ethnofictional feature film, written, directed and edited by António Reis and Margarida Cordeiro and released in 1976. It takes its name from the Portuguese region of Trás-os-Montes from which the film emanated.

== Release and reception ==
Upon watching Trás-os-Montes the French filmmaker and anthropologist Jean Rouch wrote about the film:

For me, this film reveals a new cinematographic language.

Since its release, the film has been part of the official selection of numerous film festivals and events, from 1976 to nowadays, where it has been awarded several prizes. Among them are:

- 1976 – Toulon Film Festival – Special Prize of the Jury, Critics Award
- 1976 – Pesaro Film Festival – Critics Award
- 1976 – Bedford Film Festival
- 1976 – XI Challenge de Cartago
- 1977 – Mannheim Film Festival – Main Award of Mannheim
- 1977 – Rotterdam Film Festival
- 1977 – Anvers Film Festival
- 1977 – Bedalmena Film Festival
- 1977 – London Film Festival
- 1978 – Viermole Film Festival – Award for Best Film, Award for Best Directing
- 1978 – Belgrado Film Festival
- 1978 – Venice Film Festival
- 1978 – São Paulo's Mostra Internacional de Cinema
- 1979 – Lecce Film Festival – Honorable Mention to the Cinematography

In 2011, Trás-os-Montes was screened at the Jeonju International Film Festival, marking the beginning of the international rediscovery of the work of António Reis and Margarida Cordeiro. In 2012, the film was screened in the United States at the Harvard Film Archive, the Anthology Film Archives, at the UCLA Film and Television Archives and at the Pacific Film Archive as part of The School of Reis program.

== See also ==
- Docufiction
- List of docufiction films

== External connections ==
- Trás-os-Montes at IMDb
- Jean Rouch's letter about Trás-os-Montes
- Serge Daney interview to António Reis about Trás-os-Montes (fr)
- Trás-os-Montes at The School of Reis page at the Harvard Film Archive website
- Trás-os-Montes at The School of Reis page at the UCLA Film and Television Archive website
- Trás-os-Montes at The School of Reis (Anthology Film Archives website]
