= Jaime (1974 film) =

- Directed by: António Reis
- Screenplay by: António Reis; Margarida Cordeiro
- Produced by: Henrique Espírito Santo
- Starring: Jaime Fernandes; Evangelina Gil Delgado
- Cinematography: Acácio de Almeida
- Edited by: António Reis; Margarida Cordeiro
- Music by: Louis Armstrong; Stockhausen; Telemann
- Production company: Centro Português de Cinema (CPC)
- Release date: 1974
- Running time: 37 minutes
- Country: Portugal
- Language: Portuguese

Jaime is a Portuguese medium-length documentary film, directed by António Reis and released in 1974. Its subject is the life of Jaime Fernandes, an artist and patient of the psychiatric Hospital Miguel Bombarda in Lisbon.

In the words of António Reis, Jaime "is not a story, but it is a film where everything matters".
