= Moana (1926 film) =

- Full film
- Directed by: Robert J. Flaherty
- Written by: Robert J. Flaherty
- Produced by: Robert J. Flaherty
- Starring: Fa'agase Su'a-Filo; Pe'a; Ta'avale; Tugaita
- Cinematography: Robert J. Flaherty
- Edited by: Robert J. Flaherty
- Production company: Robert Flaherty Productions
- Distributed by: Paramount Pictures
- Release date: January 7, 1926 (U.S.)
- Running time: 85 minutes; 7 reels at 6,133 feet
- Country: United States
- Language: Silent (English intertitles)

Moana (pronounced [ˈmo.ana]) is a 1926 American silent documentary film, or more strictly a work of docufiction, which was directed by Robert J. Flaherty, creator of Nanook of the North (1922), and his wife Frances H. Flaherty. A reviewer of the film coined the now-common term "documentary".

== Production ==
Moana was filmed in Samoa (then under the Western Samoa Trust Territory) in the villages of Safune district on the island of Savai'i. The name of the lead male character, Moana, means 'deep sea, deep water' in the Samoan language. In making the film, Flaherty lived with his wife and collaborator Frances H. Flaherty and their three daughters in Samoa for more than a year. They arrived in Samoa in April 1923 and stayed until December 1924, with the film being completed in December 1925.

Hoping that Flaherty could repeat the success of Nanook, Paramount Pictures sent him to Samoa to capture the traditional life of the Polynesians on film. Flaherty reportedly arrived with 16 tons of filmmaking equipment. This included both a regular movie camera and a Prizma color camera, as Flaherty hoped to film some footage in that color process, but the Prizmacolor camera malfunctioned.

Moana is thought to be the first feature film made with panchromatic black-and-white film rather than the orthochromatic film commonly used at the time in Hollywood feature films. Flaherty developed his film as he went along, in a cave on Savai'i. In the process, he inadvertently poisoned himself and required treatment after he drank water from the cave that contained silver nitrate, which washed off the film stock. The silver nitrate also caused spots to form on the negative.

As in the earlier Nanook (and his later film, Man of Aran), Flaherty went well beyond recording the life of the people of Samoa as it happened. He followed his usual procedure of "casting" locals whom he considered potentially photogenic performers into "roles", including creating fictitious family relationships.

He also, as in the other films, on occasion set up scenes in which exotic earlier practices were re-enacted as if still current. In Nanook and Man of Aran, it included setting up anachronistic hunting sequences. In Moana, at a time when Samoans were typically wearing modern Western-style clothing under the influence of Christian missionaries, Flaherty persuaded his performers to don traditional tapa cloth costumes (made from the bark of the paper mulberry tree, in a process shown in some detail in the film); the "maidens" went topless.

He also staged a coming-into-manhood ritual in which the young male lead underwent a painful traditional Samoan tattoo, for which the young man required a generous compensation. Those devices have led to Flaherty's films sometimes being categorized as "docufiction".

Still, it emerged that living off the land and the ocean in Samoa was comparatively easy, leaving limited scope for Flaherty to draw on his favored theme of "Man against Nature" as he had in Nanook and was to again in Man of Aran. Thus, although the film was visually stunning and drew critical praise at the time, it lacked the raw drama of Nanook, which may have contributed to its failure at the box office. (Bruce Posner, the film's restorer, commented: "God knows what Paramount expected. It was just poorly released. They tried to shift it into a love story of the South Seas, which it is, but not a conventional one.")

== Reception ==
John Grierson coined the term "documentary" in his review for the film written under the name "The Moviegoer" in the New York Sun on February 8, 1926.

== Restoration ==
The youngest of the children Robert and Frances Flaherty brought with them to Samoa was their then-three-year-old daughter Monica. In 1975, Monica Flaherty returned to Savai'i to create a soundtrack for her parents' hitherto-silent film, including recording ambient sounds of village life, dubbed Samoan dialogue and traditional singing. The resulting "Moana with Sound" was completed in 1980, with help from filmmakers Jean Renoir and Richard Leacock, and first shown publicly in Paris in 1981. At that stage, however, with the original negative no longer in existence, the visual quality of Monica Flaherty's 16 mm print (a copy of a copy of her father's original 35 mm nitrate film) left much to be desired, and it was to suffer further degradation with time. The 1981 version was not distributed, partly because of its visual flaws and partly because Monica Flaherty did not reach an agreement with Paramount over the proceeds.

More recently, preservationist and curator Bruce Posner and Finnish filmmaker Sami van Ingen, a great-grandson of the Flahertys, drew on the best surviving 35 mm copies of the film to prepare, with the assistance of restorer Thomas Bakels, a digitally restored print. This was matched by sound expert Lee Dichter to Monica Flaherty's soundtrack. The restored "Moana with Sound" was shown at the New York Film Festival on September 30, 2014, and has also appeared, among other showings, at the National Archives in Washington DC (January 2015). The program for the New York Film Festival describes the restored version as "absolutely wondrous".

== See also ==
- List of docufiction films
- South Seas genre

== Works cited ==
- John Grierson and the NFB. ECW Press. 1984. ISBN 092080280X.
