= Margarida Cordeiro =

Portuguese psychiatrist and film director (born 1938

- Born: Maria Margarida Cordeiro; 5 July 1938 (age 87); Brunhozinho, Mogadouro, Portugal
- Occupations: Psychiatrist, film director, screenwriter
- Years active: 1974-1989
- Known for: Developed School of Reis
- Notable work: Jaime; Ana; Trás-os-Montes

Margarida Cordeiro (born 5 July 1938) is a Portuguese psychiatrist and film director from Mogadouro. The art concepts developed by her and film director António Reis are called The School of Reis.

== Filmography ==
=== As writer ===
- Jaime (1974)

=== As director ===
- Ana (1982)
- Trás-os-Montes (1976)
- Rosa de Areia (1989)
