= António Reis =

Portuguese film director (1927–1991)

- Born: August 27, 1925; Valadares, Portugal
- Died: September 10, 1991 (aged 66); Portugal
- Occupation(s): Film director, film writer, film producer, film professor
- Spouse: Margarida Cordeiro (common-law wife)
- Children: Ana Reis (1977)

António Ferreira Gonçalves dos Reis, known as António Reis (27 August 1925 – 10 September 1991), was a Portuguese film director, screenwriter and producer, poet, sculptor and ethnographer. He occupies an original place in the history of Portuguese film.

== Life ==
Reis was born in 1925 in Vila Nova de Gaia.

He was also teacher at the Lisbon Theatre and Film School for several years. Reis died in Lisbon in September 10, 1991, of undetermined causes.

Margarida Cordeiro, psychiatrist, was assistant director to Jaime (1974) and co-director of Trás-os-Montes (1976), Ana (1985) and Rosa de Areia (1989).

== Legacy ==
=== Teaching ===
António Reis taught classes at the Portuguese National Film School, such as Filmic Space in 1977, and later Film Analysis, History of Image, Direction of Actors and Introduction to the Study of Image.

One of the characteristics of his teaching method was that it was almost exclusively oral, existing very few written materials retaining his theory, in what could be stated to be a reflex of António Reis' beliefs in the ancient oral tradition.

One of the recognizable aspects of António Reis' aesthetics was his structuring of the cinematographical unity around the exploration of the limits of the possibilities of the match cut producing visual rhymes, associations and understated meanings, clearly identifiable in works of his like Jaime or Trás-os-Montes.

=== Influence ===
António Reis' works had a major impact on the practices of contemporaries of his like Manoel de Oliveira, whom Reis assisted in his second feature, Rite of Spring, in 1963; Paulo Rocha, having Reis written the script for his feature Change of Life; or João César Monteiro, whose quotations of Reis are clear in films as Recollections of the Yellow House, God's Comedy or Silvestre.

However, Dennis Lim, in his article for the magazine Artforum, points out that "for today’s preeminent Portuguese filmmakers, no single figure has been more influential than António Reis." Through his teachings, Reis has had a major impact in the work of subsequent filmmakers of whom he was a professor, as Joaquim Sapinho, Vítor Gonçalves, Pedro Costa, Manuela Viegas and João Pedro Rodrigues. Some of them, like Sapinho, Gonçalves or Viegas are today professors at the Escola Superior de Teatro e Cinema, the current name for the former Portuguese National Film School. His work and films influenced subsequent directors, whose informal group the historian Haden Guest, considering they form a cinematographic "family", called "The School of Reis".

== Filmography ==
- 1959: Auto de Floripes (co-director)
- 1963: Painéis do Porto
- 1964: Do Céu ao Rio (co-director with César Guerra Leal)
- 1966: Alto do Rabagão (co-director with César Guerra Leal)
- 1966: Mudar de Vida (directed by Paulo Rocha, script by António Reis)
- 1974: Jaime
- 1976: Trás-os-Montes (co-director with Margarida Cordeiro)
- 1985: Ana (co-director with Margarida Cordeiro)
- 1989: Rosa de Areia (co-director with Margarida Cordeiro)

== Bibliography ==
=== Works by António Reis ===
- Chamas. Porto: Portugália, 1947.
- Luz. Porto: Portugália, 1948.
- Roda de fogo. Porto: Portugália, 1949.
- Ronda do Suão. Porto: Portugália, 1949.
- Poemas do Cais. Porto: Portugália, 1949.
- Poemas do escritório. Porto: Portugália, 1951.
- Ode à amizade. Porto: Portugália, 1952.
- Poemas Quotidianos (1957)
- Novos Poemas Quotidianos (1959)
- Poemas Quotidianos - Col. Poetas de Hoje (1967; re-published in 2017, Tinta-da-China)

== See also ==
- O Acto da Primavera (1962), directed by Manoel de Oliveira, assisted by António Reis
