= Afrika Festival Hertme =

Music festival in Hertme, the Netherlands

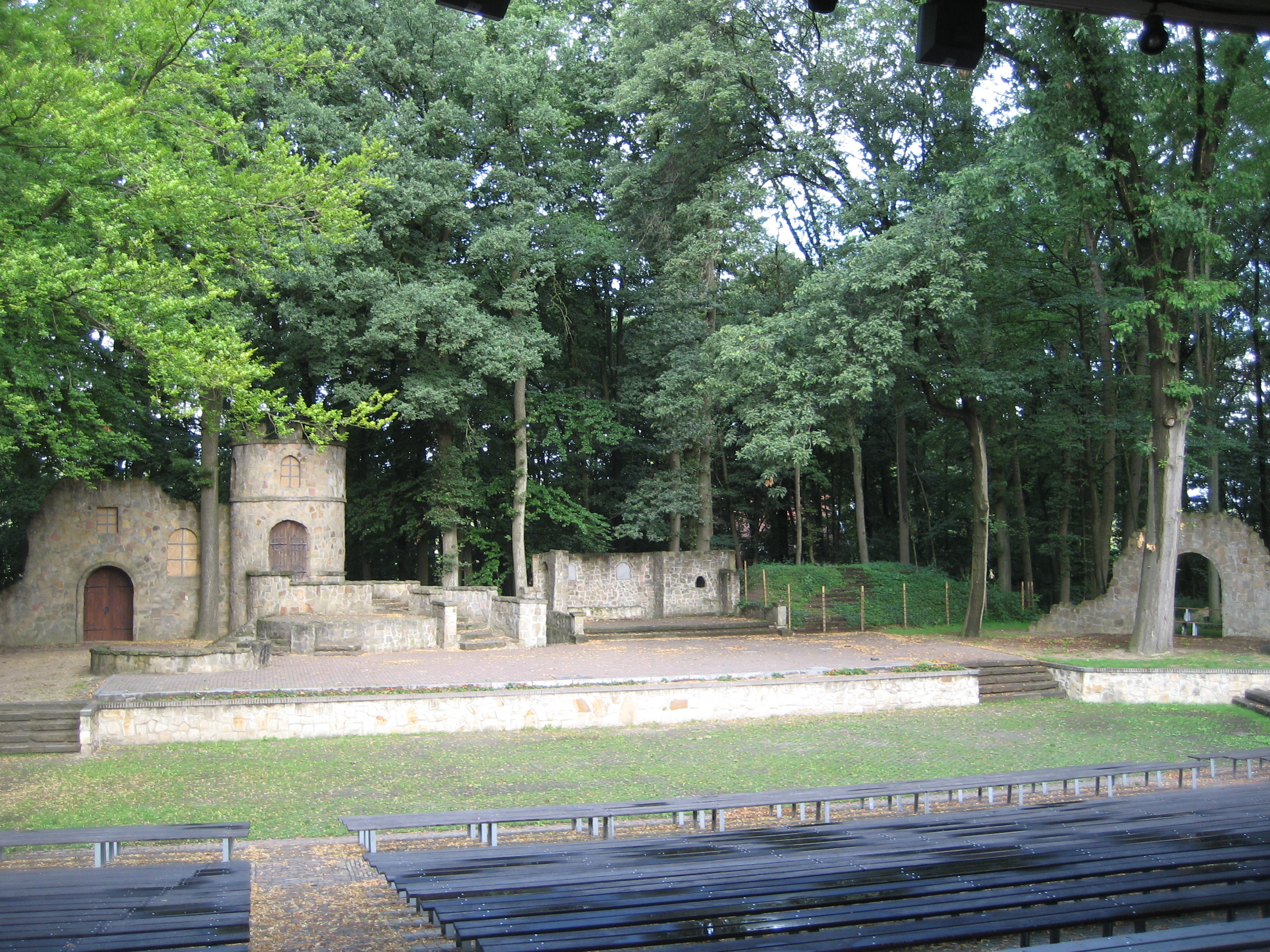
- Stage of the open air theatre Hertme
- Genre: African music
- Dates: July
- Locations: Hertme, Netherlands
- Years active: 1989–2019, 2022-present
- Attendance: 4000 (2019)
- Website: https://openluchttheaterhertme.nl/afrikafestival/en

The Afrika Festival Hertme is an annual two day festival of African music in the Dutch village of Hertme.

== History ==
It started spontaneously in 1989, with a performance by a dance group from Burkina Faso. Thousands of people come and there are many stalls selling exotic food and merchandise. The festival celebrated its 25th anniversary in 2013, thanks in part to the efforts of retired general practitioner and organizer Rob Lokin. He was awarded the Silver Carnation in 2010 for this work. It is supported by about 400 volunteers and is a major enterprise for a village of 500 residents. As well as the main stage there is an African market with over a hundred stands, caterers with mostly African snacks and a side program of dance and music. In 2013, 2014 and 2015 the magazine Songlines voted the Africa Festival one of the 25 best festivals in Europe. In 2019 there were 4000 attendees. In 2020 it was cancelled because of the COVID-19 pandemic in the Netherlands. In 2021 it took place online. It returned in reality in 2022.

== Performing artists (selection) ==
Artists who have performed at the festival include:

- Simba Wanyika (1991)
- Oumou Sangaré (1993, 2017)
- DDC Mlimani Park Orchestra (1994, 2007)
- Remmy Ongala & Orchestra Super Matimila (1995)
- Farafina (1995)
- Habib Koité (1996, 1998, 2014)
- Boubacar Traoré (1997, 2012)
- Distro Kuomboka (1999)
- Eusèbe Jaojoby (2000, 2004)
- Oliver Mtukudzi (2000, 2013)
- Bonga (2001, 2007, 2013)
- Lágbájá (2001)
- Omar Pene & Le Super Diamono de Dakar (2002)
- Tinariwen (2002)
- Orchestra Baobab (2002)
- Tinariwen (2002)
- Sally Nyolo (2002)
- Minyeshu & Chewata (2003)
- Spirit Talk Mbira & Chartwell Dutiro (2003, 2018)
- Tabu Ley Rochereau (2003)
- Tito Paris (2003)
- Bembeya Jazz (2003)
- Afel Bocoum (2003, 2010)
- Femi Kuti & The Positive Force (2004)
- Gangbé Brass Band (2004)
- Ba Cissoko (2004, 2010)
- Etran Finatawa (2005, 2008)
- Kékélé (2005)
- Mahmoud Ahmed (2005, 2015)
- Eyuphuro & Ali Faque (2006)
- Rajery (2006, 2013, 2018)
- Zaïko Langa Langa (2006)
- Royal Drummers of Burundi (2006, 2013)
- Djelimady Tounkara (2006)
- Mahotella Queens (2006)
- Cheikh Lô (2006)
- Koo Nimo Palmwine Quartet (2007)
- Adama Yalomba (2007)
- Bassekou Kouyaté & Ngoni ba (2007, 2013)
- Kristo Numpuby (2007)
- Dizu Plaatjies Ibuyambo Ensemble (2008)
- Lura (2008)
- Mamar Kassey (2008, 2014)
- Alemayehu Eshete & Badume's Band (2008)
- Vieux Farka Touré (2008)
- Eneida Marta (2009)
- Nuru Kane & Bayefall Gnawa (2009)
- Blick Bassy (2009)
- Dobet Gnahoré (2009)
- Bana OK with Josky Kiambukuta (2009)
- Culture Musical Club with Bi Kidude (2009)
- Kasai Allstars (2009, 2015)
- Mamady Keïta & Sewa Kan (2009)
- Sauti Sol & Stan (2010)
- Fatoumata Diawara (2010)
- Les Quatre Étoiles (2010)
- Mokoomba (2010, 2022)
- Ebo Taylor & Bonze Konkoma (2010)
- Mariem Hassan (2010)
- Aurelio Martinez (2010)
- Baba Sissoko & the Mali Tamani Revolution (2011)
- Khaira Arby (2011)
- Orchestre Poly-Rythmo de Cotonou (2011)
- Mayra Andrade (2011)
- Staff Benda Bilili (2011)
- Kareyce Fotso (2011)
- Seun Kuti & Egypt 80 (2011)
- Hugh Masekela (2012)
- Menwar (2012)
- Super Mama Djombo (2012)
- Jupiter & Okwess International (2012, 2017)
- Juldeh Camara & Justin Adams (2012)
- Hugh Masekela (2012)
- Samba Mapangala & Orchestra Virunga (2012)
- Richard Bona (2013)
- King Ayisoba & Band (2013)
- Salif Keita (2013, 2014, 2024)
- Tony Allen (2013)
- Aziz Sahmaoui & University of Gnawa (2014)
- Nancy Vieira (2014)
- Fendika & Circus Debre Berhan (2014)
- Génération Taragalte (2015)
- Samba Touré (2015, 2022)
- Mariam Koné (2015)
- Ben Zabo (2015)
- Ahmed Ag Kaedy (2015)
- Sekouba Bambino (2015)
- Kassé Mady Diabaté (2015)
- Youssou N'Dour (2016)
- Oum (2016)
- Orlando Julius & The Heliocentrics (2016)
- Songhoy Blues (2016)
- Pat Thomas & Kwashibu Area Band (2016)
- Odemba OK Jazz Allstars & Sam Mangwana (2016)
- Rokia Traoré (2017)
- Trio Da Kali (2017)
- Mamadou Diabaté & Percussion Mania (2017)
- Ali Farka Touré Band & Terakaft (2017)
- Rokia Traoré (2017)
- Dele Sosimi Afrobeat Orchestra (2017)
- Sona Jobarteh (2018)
- Alpha Blondy & The Solar System (2018)
- Zoë Modiga (2022)
- Martin Meissonnier (2022)
- Elida Almeida (2022)
