= The Blue Eyes of Yonta =

Udju Azui di Yonta
- Film poster
- Directed by: Flora Gomes
- Written by: Manuel Rambout Barcelos, Ina Césaire, Flora Gomes, David Lang
- Produced by: Paulo De Sousa
- Cinematography: Dominique Gentil
- Music by: Adriano Gomes Ferreira
- Release date: February 5, 1991
- Running time: 90 minutes
- Countries: Portugal, Guinea-Bissau
- Language: Guinea-Bissau Creole

Udju Azul di Yonta / The Blue Eyes of Yonta is a 1991 Portuguese film, the second film by the Bissau-Guinean director Flora Gomes. The government of Guinea-Bissau helped in production, together with the Institute of Cinema in Portugal, Vermedia Productions, and Portuguese television.

Udju Azul di Yonta examines the aftermath of the Guinea-Bissau War of Independence, "in the lives of those who fought, as well as in the lives of their children who are the hope of the future." The film is structured around a triangle of unrequited love: the young student Zé is infatuated with the beautiful Yonta, who in turn is in love with Vicente, a militant former comrade of Yonta's father.

The soundtrack was created by the band Super Mama Djombo, with members reuniting under the name for this purpose.
