= Po di Sangui =

2008 French-language Bissau-Guinean drama film

- Directed by: Flora Gomes
- Written by: Anita Fernández; Flora Gomes
- Produced by: Films sans Frontières; S.P. Filmes; Arco Iris; Cinétéléfilms; Radiotelevisão Portuguesa (RTP)
- Starring: Dulceneia Bidjanque; Djuco Bodjan; Dadu Cissé; Adama Kouyaté; Edna Evora
- Cinematography: Vincenzo Marano
- Edited by: Christiane Lack
- Music by: Pablo Cueco
- Distributed by: California Newsreel; Films sans Frontières; Uniportugal
- Release date: 13 November 1996 (France)
- Running time: 90 min.
- Countries: France; Guinea-Bissau
- Language: French

Po di Sangui (Tree of Blood), is a 1996 Bissau-Guinean–French drama film directed by Flora Gomes and produced by Jean-Pierre Gallepe. The film stars Dulceneia Bidjanque in lead role along with Djuco Bodjan, Dadu Cissé, Adama Kouyaté and Edna Evora in supportive roles.

The film was shot in the village of Amanha Lundju. The film received critical acclaim and won several awards at international film festivals.

== Cast ==
- Dulceneia Bidjanque as Luana
- Djuco Bodjan as N'te
- Dadu Cissé as Puntcha
- Edna Evora as Sally
- Bia Gomes as Antonia
- Adama Kouyaté as Calacalado
- Ramiro Naka as Dou

== International screenings ==
- France – May 1996 (Cannes Film Festival)
- Argentina – 8 November 1996 (Mar del Plata Film Festival)
- France – 13 November 1996
- Portugal – 31 July 1998
- USA – 30 April 1999 (New York African Film Festival)
- Czech Republic – 25 January 2004 (Febio Film Festival)
