= Azelo =

Azelo Oazel(e) (Twents)
- Hamlet
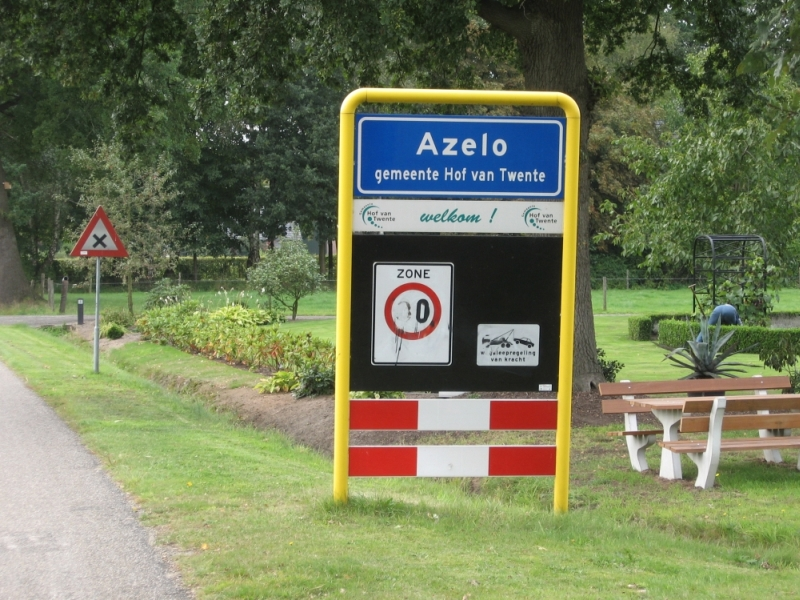
- Entrance to Azelo

- Location in the province of Overijssel in the Netherlands Azelo (Netherlands)
- Coordinates: 52°18′N 6°43′E
- Country: Netherlands
- Province: Overijssel
- Municipality: Borne; Hof van Twente; Almelo
- Elevation: 14.8 m (49 ft)

Population (2023)
  - Total: 245
- Time zone: UTC+1 (CET)
  - Summer (DST): UTC+2 (CEST)
- Postcode: 7495
- Area code: 074
- Website: azelo.nl

Azelo (Dutch: [ˈaːzəloː]; Tweants: Oazel(e)) is a hamlet in the municipalities of Hof van Twente, Borne, and Almelo in the province of Overijssel in the Netherlands. It is located between Borne, Bornerbroek, and Delden and has approximately 250 inhabitants. Until January 1, 2001, Azelo belonged largely to the municipality of Ambt Delden. The hamlet is particularly known for the Azelo junction, where the A1 motorway and the A35 motorway meet.

The Azelerbeek flows east of the center of Azelo.

The hamlet was first attested as Aselo in 1333. The name is likely a compound of Old Dutch Aso (a personal name) and lo ("light forest"). Azelo used to be a hamlet and marke in the richterambt of Delden. The erfmarkenrichterschap of marke Azelo was originally located on the Hof van Azelo, the current farms of Have and Meijer. After Twickel bought the markenrichterschap in the seventeenth century, the meetings were usually kept on the Graes farm.

The manor of Dubbelink used to be located in the hamlet of Azelo. A remnant of this is the so-called Meistershoes ('Master's House') on the Meijerinkveldkampsweg. The old Dubbelink bakehouse also still exists.

A large number of the farms in Azelo, including Graes, Grave, Morskate, and the farms on Dubbelink, belong to the Twickel estate.

The hamlet's area has a large spread size, and is located in three different municipalities. This is mainly due to a boundary correction during the 2001 reorganization, in which the municipal boundaries were located along the A1 motorway. Because of this, a third of the hamlet is partly in the municipality of Borne and partly in the municipality of Almelo. The vast majority, however, is located in the municipality of Hof van Twente, which is also indicated on the place name sign of the hamlet.

== Gallery ==
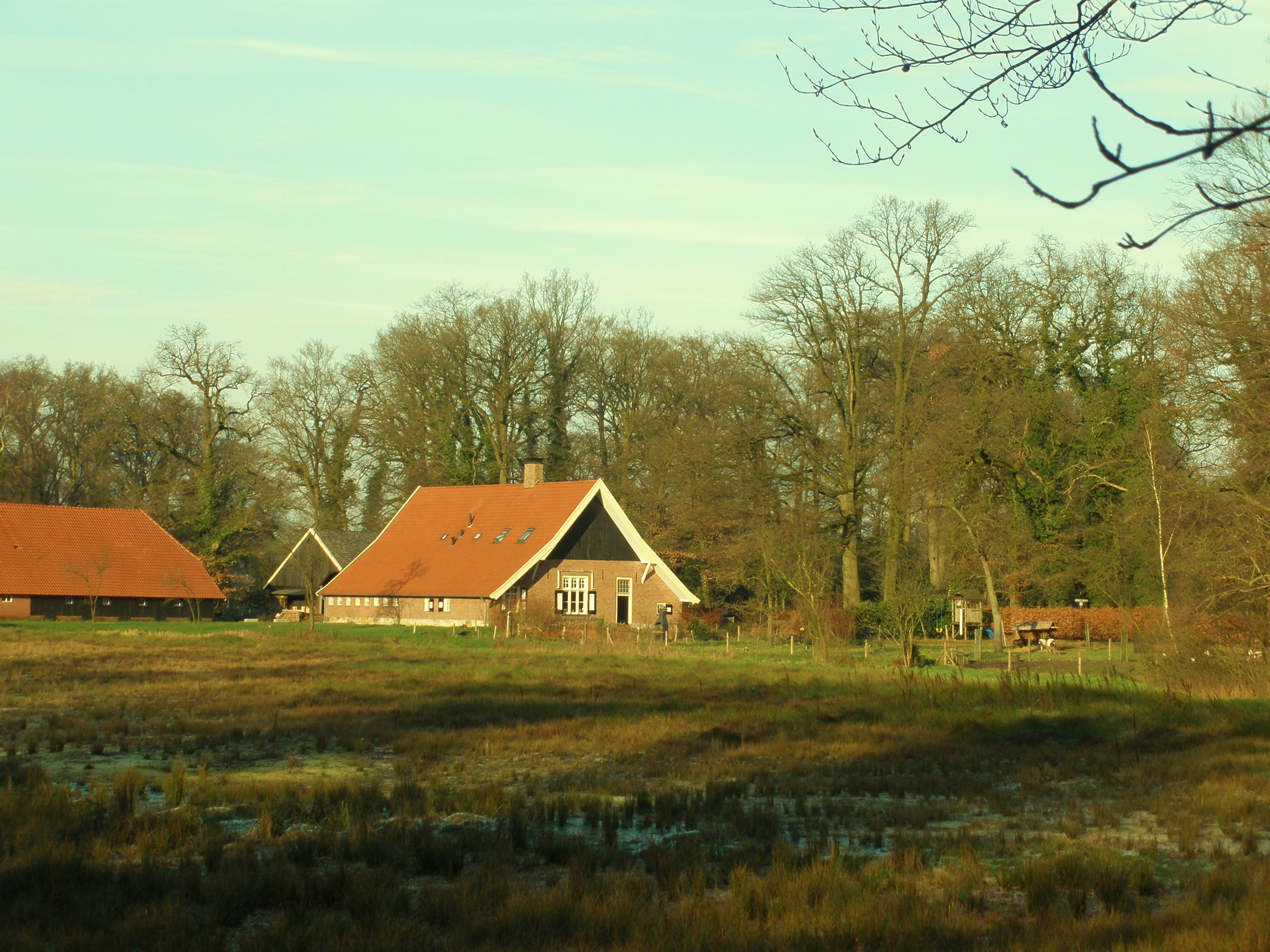
Dubbelink manor

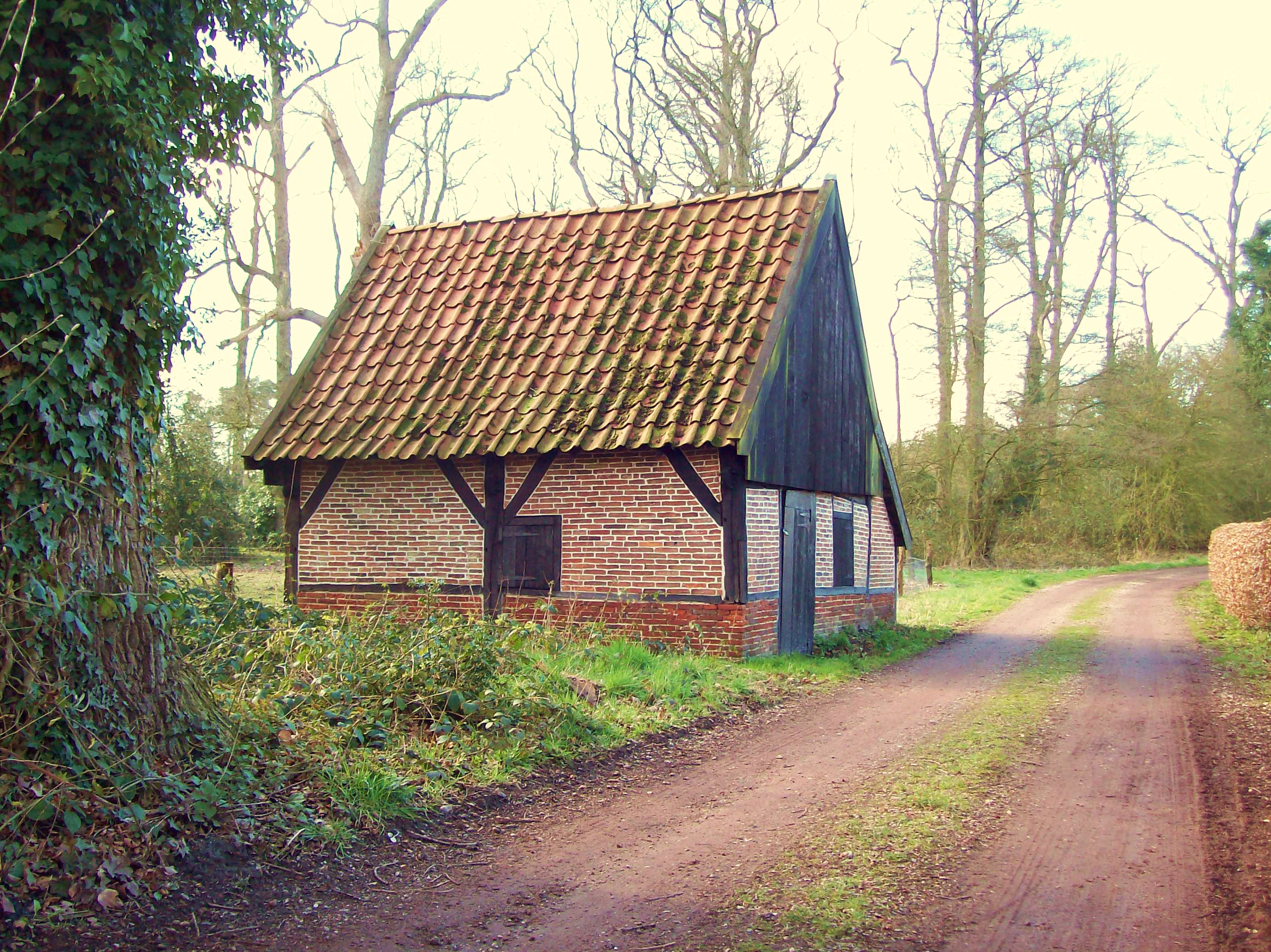
Dubbelink bakehouse

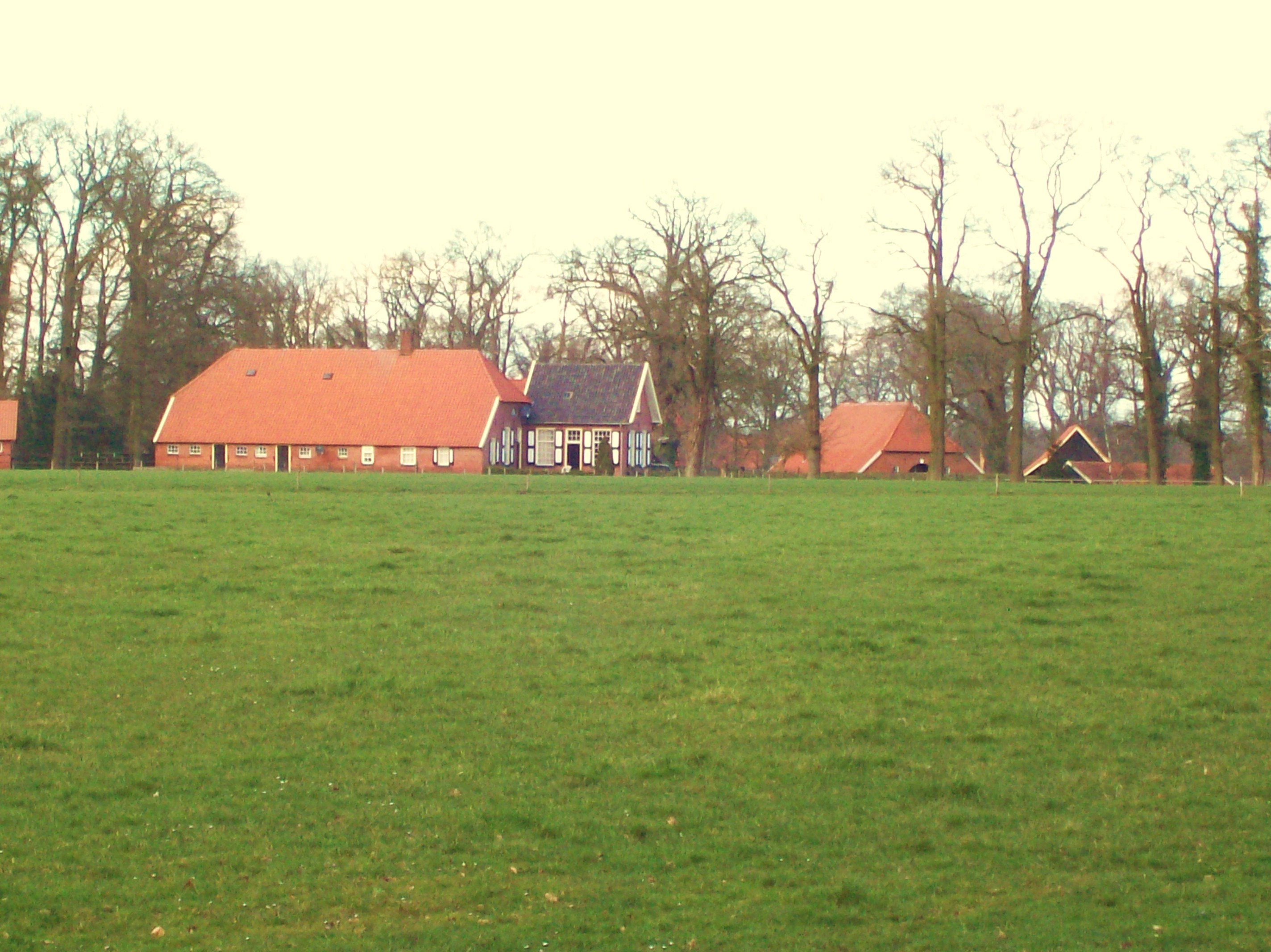
Meijer farm

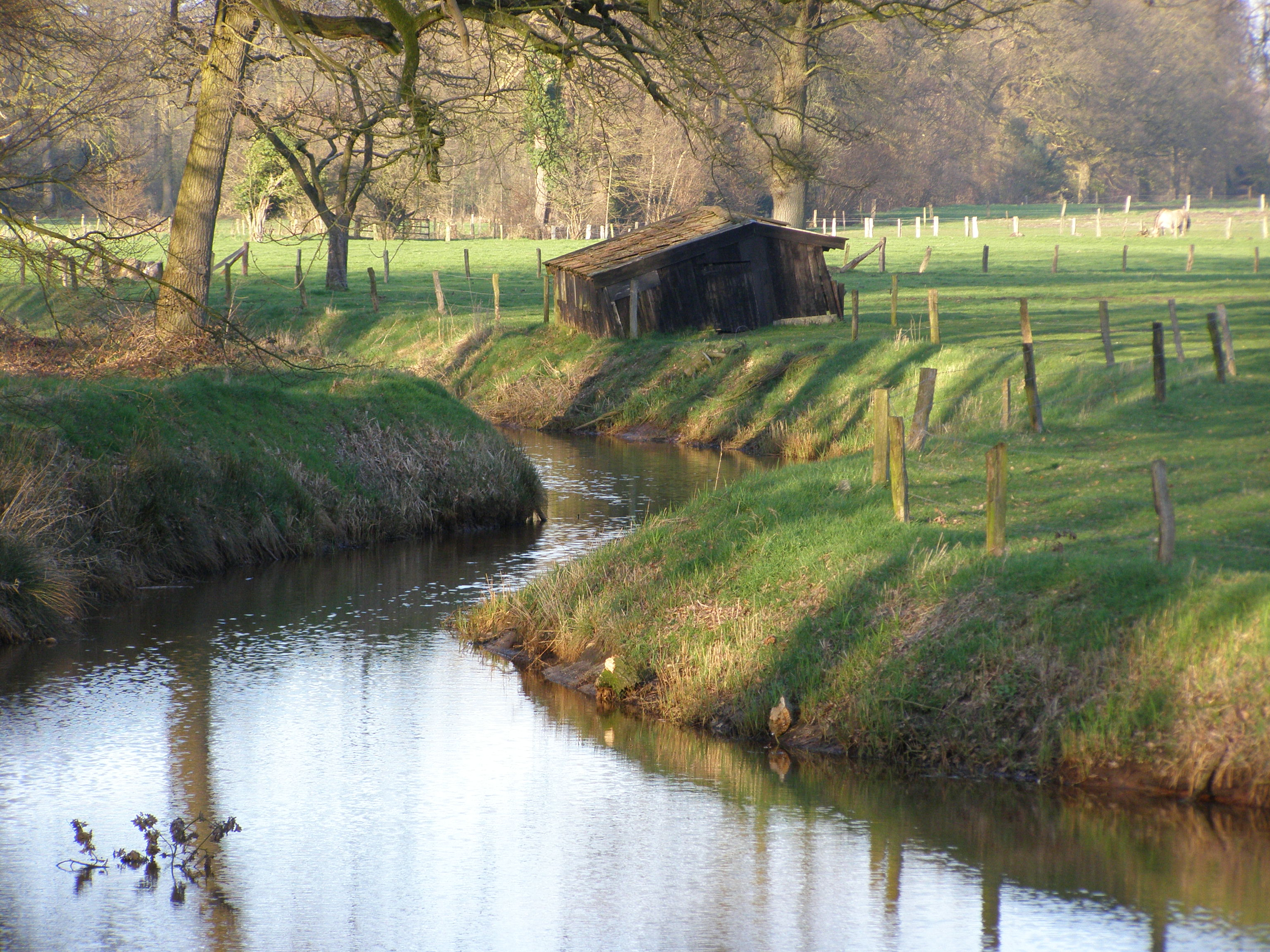
The Azelerbeek
