= Mokoomba =

Zimbabwean musical group

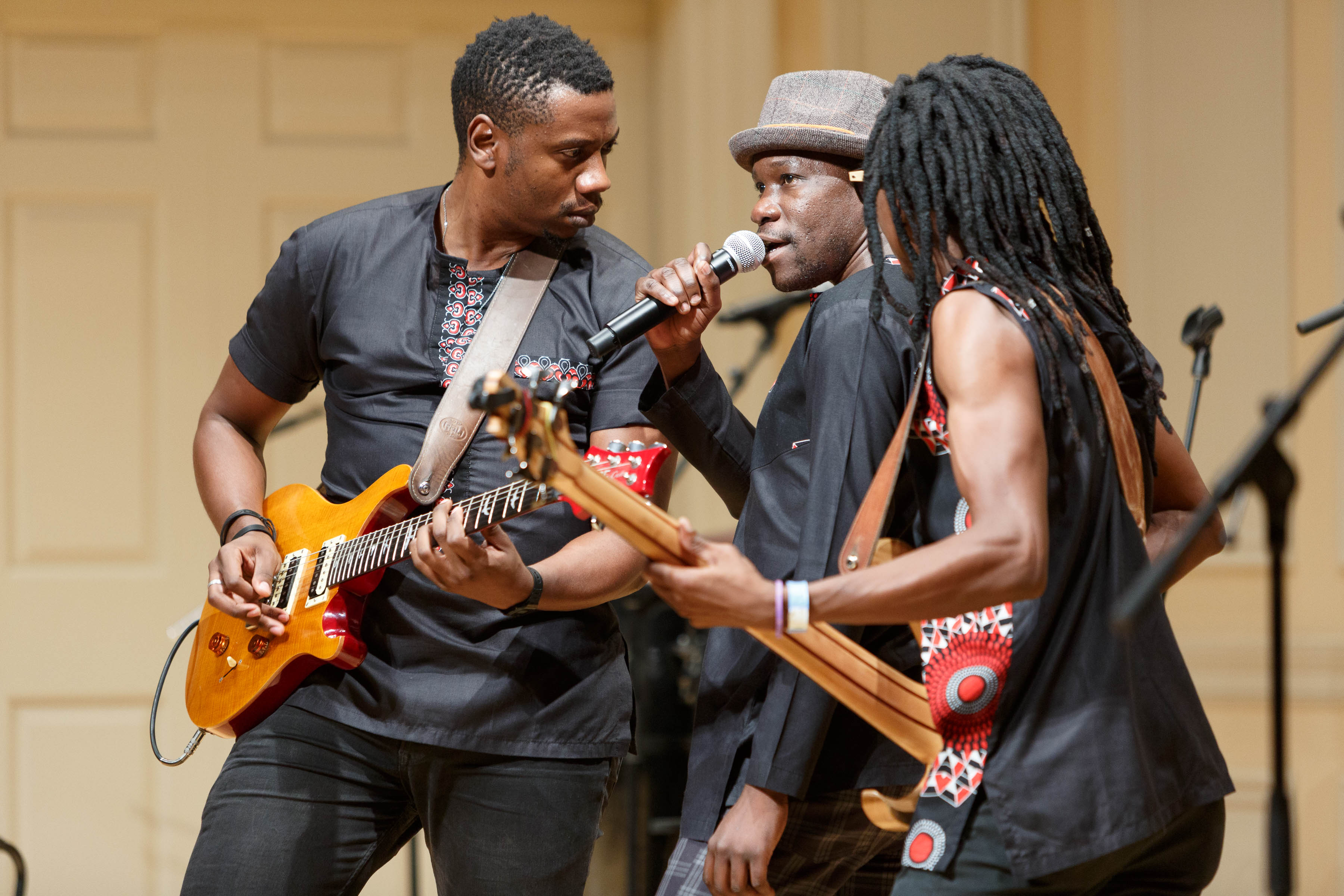
- Mokoomba performs at the Library of Congress in 2019

Background information
- Origin: Victoria Falls, Zimbabwe
- Genres: Afro fusion; Afropop; pop; funk; reggae
- Instruments: keyboard, guitar, bass, drums, percussion, vocals
- Years active: Since 2002
- Labels: Igloo Records, Outhere Records
- Members: Mathias Muzaza; Trustworth Samende; Abundance Mutori; Donald Moyo; Ndaba Coster Moyo; Miti Mugande; Phathisani Moyo
- Website: www.mokoomba.band

Mokoomba is a Zimbabwean musical group, originally from Chinotimba township, Victoria Falls, Zimbabwe. The group sings in a number of languages including English, Luvale, Tonga, Nyanja, Ndebele and Shona. Mokoomba takes its name from a Tonga word that connotes deep respect for the Zambezi river and the vibrant life along its banks.

Mokoomba combine traditional and modern instruments and a variety of international pop and pan-African styles – including soukous, funk and reggae – to bring together different cultures from Southern, East and Central Africa. Mokoomba has released four albums so far, and is currently signed to the Afrocentric German record label Outhere Records.

Mokoomba has toured widely, and won critical praise at home and abroad. The Guardian's Robin Denslow called Mokoomba "the best young band in Zimbabwe", while Afropop World Wide's Banning Eyre described them as "quite simply the most impressive band Zimbabwe has produced in recent memory". Jon Pareles of The New York Times called lead singer Mathias Muzaza's vocal range "riveting" and "griot-strength". Issac Chirwa praised Mokoomba as "Zimbabwe's best band" in Zimbabwe's Daily News Live.

== History ==
Formed between 2002 and 2007, the group began its professional career in 2008. Their performance at the Music Crossroads InterRegional Festival (IRF) in Lilongwe, Malawi, won them a European tour and they recorded their first album with six titles, Kweseka. Their songs deal with Zimbabwean life, the HIV/AIDS epidemic, and social ills, with a substantive message to keep hoping. Their 2009 tour was a success in major European cities such as Stockholm, Brussels, Oslo, Barcelona, Bilbao and Amsterdam, leading to a new tour in 2010 across Europe. Other festivals include the Colors of Ostrava Festival in the Czech Republic, the Couleur Café festival in Brussels, the Meyouzik Festival in Luxembourg, the Pirineos Festival in Spain, and the Afrika Festival Hertme in the Netherlands.

Mokoomba played at the annual Harare International Festival of the Arts in 2013, and won critical acclaim at home with more recent releases and concerts.

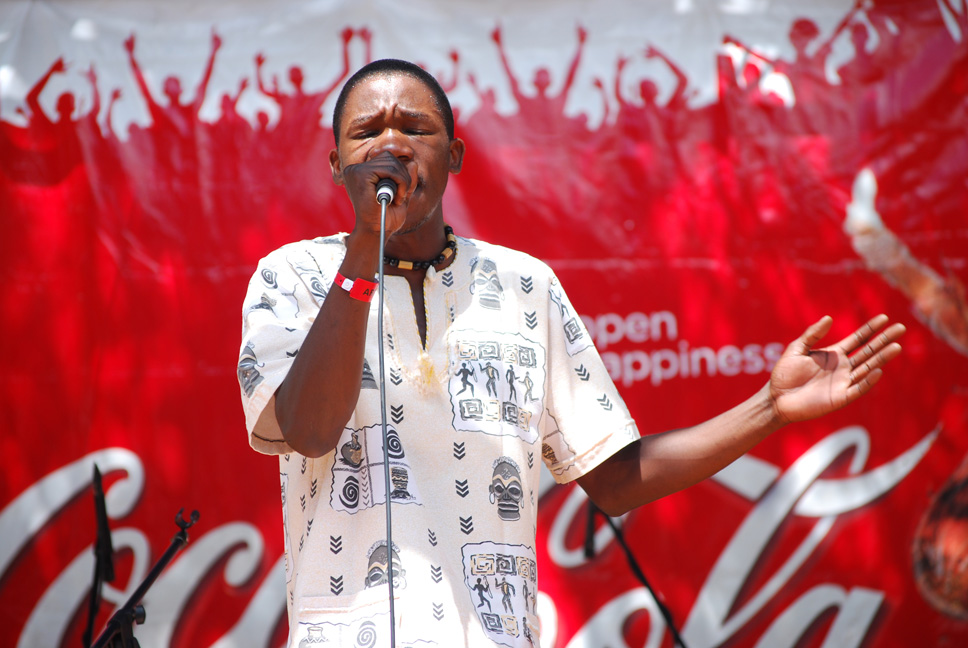
Mathias Muzaza lead vocalist for Mokoomba at Harare International Festival of the Arts 2011.

Their second album Rising Tide, produced by the Ivorian singer Manou Gallo, was very well received by the public and the critics, and was nominated in the Songlines Music Award 2013 in the "Revelation" category, awarded by Songlines magazine. Mokoomba also made their UK television debut in October, 2012, performing songs from Rising Tide on Later... with Jools Holland.

After the release of Rising Tide, Mokoomba toured in Europe, North America, Australia and New Zealand, including performances at the Couleur Cafe, Gnaoua World Music Festival, Paléo Festival, Roskilde Festival, Sziget Festival, WOMAD festival, Gwanju World Music Festival in South Korea, and the Africa Now! festival at The Apollo Theater in New York City.

In February 2017, Mokoomba released its self-produced third album Luyando on Germany's OutHere label, a stripped-down, mostly acoustic album that took their sound in a new direction. That same month Mokoomba made the cover of UK world music magazine Songlines.

"Luyando" means mother's love the Tonga language. Songs on Luyando explore the vanishing traditions of Tonga and Luvale society. In 2017 Mokoomba toured Luyando internationally, making stops at the Jazz and Heritage Festival in New Orleans, LA, The Kennedy Center in Washington, D.C., Norway's Førde Festival, Canada's Edmonton Folk Festival and the Nuits d'Afrique festival in Montreal, CA.

In March, 2018 Mokoomba made their debut at the SXSW Festival in Austin, TX. In April, Mokoomba was nominated for a Songlines Award by the readers and editors of the U.K.'s Longlines magazine. Mokoomba was nominated in the "Best Group" category — their second nomination after taking home the "Best Newcomer Award" in 2013. In May, 2018 Mokoomba was inducted into the Afropop Worldwide Hall of Fame at a ceremony honoring the 30th anniversary of Peabody Award Winning media organization Afropop Worldwide. Previous honorees include King Sunny Ade, Youssou N'Dour, Oumou Sangaré, Angelique Kidjo, Oliver Mtukudzi, and Thomas Mapfumo. On September 8, 2018, Mokoomba is scheduled to perform at the Lollapalooza Festival in Berlin, Germany on a bill topped by Canadian pop star The Weeknd.

The group appear on the fourth album False Alarm by indie rock band Two Door Cinema Club, with guest vocals on the album's third song "Satisfaction Guaranteed".

Mokoomba was the subject of the 2010 documentary film Mokoomba: From One River Bank to Another, by Frank Dalmat and Francis Ducat.

== Members ==
- Mathias Muzaza – lead vocals, percussion
- Trustworth Samende – guitar, backing vocals
- Abundance Mutori – bass, backing vocals
- Donald Moyo – keyboard, backing vocals
- Ndaba Coster Moyo – drums, backing vocals
- Miti Mugande – percussion, backing vocals
- Phathisani Moyo - keyboard, backing vocals

== Discography ==
=== Albums ===
- Kweseka (Zig Zag World), 2009
- Rising Tide (Zig Zag Word / Igloo Mondo), 2012
- Luyando (Outhere Records), March 2017
- Tusona: Tracings in the Sand, (Outhere Records), 2023
