= Super Mama Djombo =

Band from Guinea-Bissau

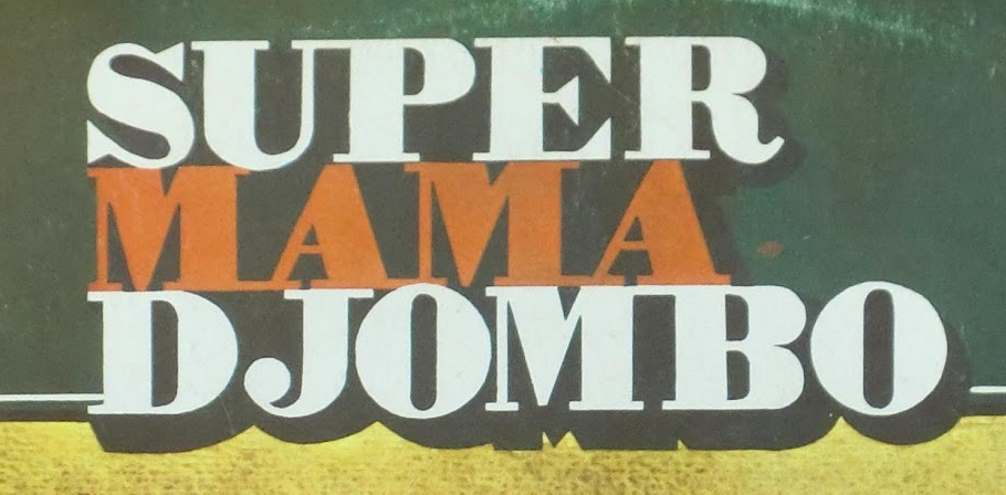

Background information
- Origin: Guinea Bissau
- Genres: Gumbé
- Years active: since mid-1960s
- Members: Fernando Correia ( from the band Freaky Sound ) Karyna Silva Gomes
- Past members: Adriano Atchutchi

Super Mama Djombo is a band from Guinea Bissau who sing in Guinea-Bissau Creole. The band was formed in the mid-1960s, at a Boy Scout camp, when the members were only children (the youngest was six years old). Mama Djombo is the name of a spirit that many fighters appealed to for protection during Guinea-Bissau's War of Independence.

In 1974, the politically conscious band leader Adriano Atchutchi joined. The group became immensely popular in the young country, which had gained its independence the same year. They would often play at President Luís Cabral's public speeches, and their concerts were broadcast live on radio.

In 1978, the group traveled to Cuba and appeared on the eleventh youth music festival in Havana. Early in 1980, they went to Lisbon and recorded six hours of material. The first album Na cambança was released the same year, and the song Pamparida, which was based on a children's song, became a huge hit throughout West Africa. In 1980 Cabral was overthrown, and the new regime under João Bernardo Vieira no longer supported the band. They had fewer opportunities to perform, and broke up in 1986. However, the soundtrack to Flora Gomes' film Udju Azul di Yonta (The blue eyes of Yonta) (1993) was recorded by Adriano Atchutchi and other members of the original band under the name of Super Mama Djombo.

The original members of the band got back together many years later and recorded Ar Puro in 2008 in Iceland.

In 2012, Super Mama Djombo toured Europe appearting at Afrika Festival Hertme. The band included several of the original members, drummer Zé Manel, guitarist Miguelinho N'Simba, percussionist Armando Vaz Pereira and Djon Motta, together with new members such as solo guitarist Fernando Correia from the band Freaky Sound. Although Adriano Atchutchi, the original lead composer and bandleader, is not part of the current line up, the military coup in April resulted in him having to leave his post as a provincial governor when the military took over the functions of the government, so he was able to attend rehearsals to help the band prepare for the tour. The band said they hoped the tour would "show people that Guinea-Bissau's loudest sound is not that of gunfire, but that of music."
