= Diana Andringa =

Angola-born Portuguese journalist

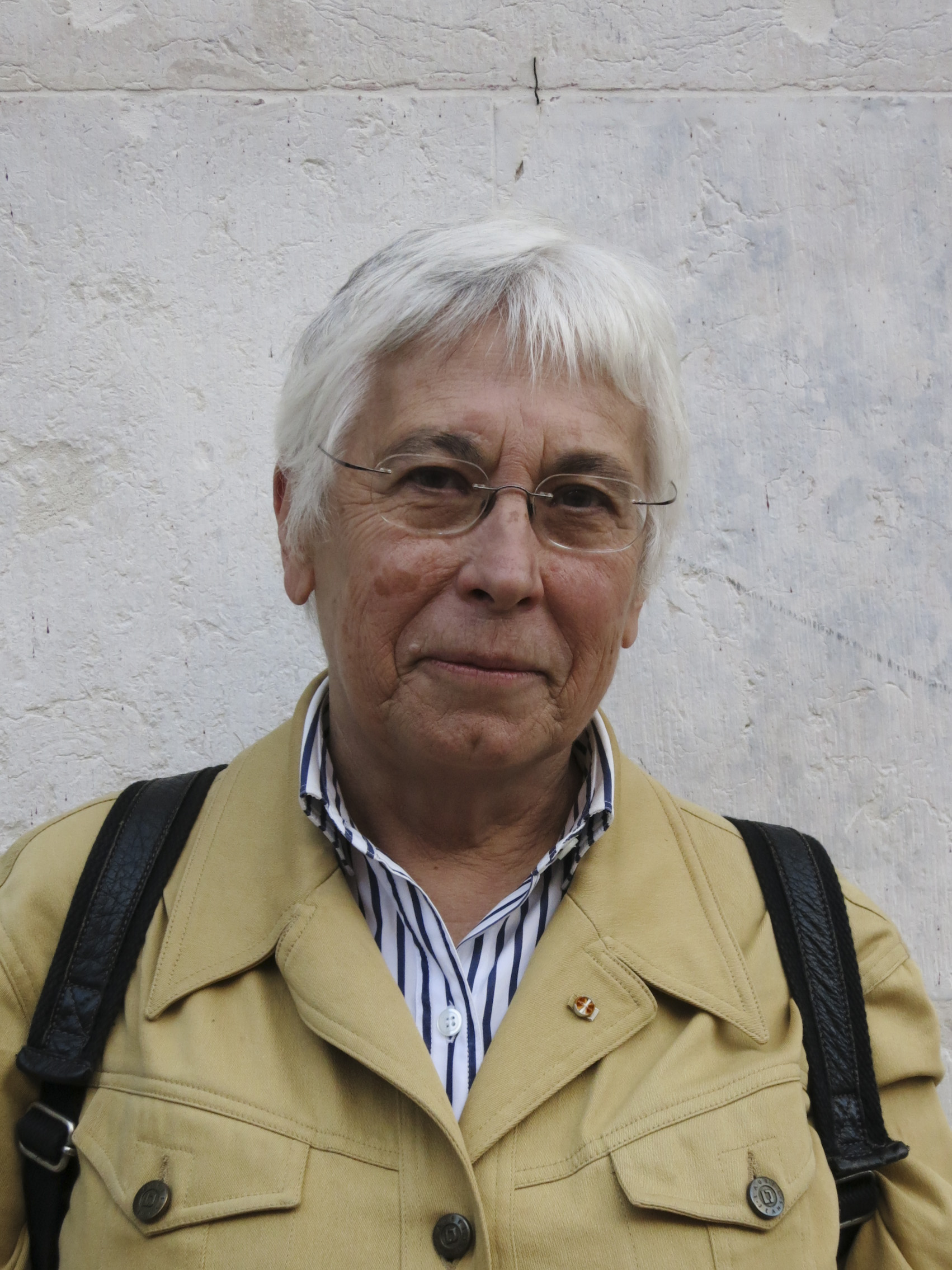
- Born: Diana Andringa; 21 August 1947 (age 79); Chitato, Angola
- Education: ISCTE – University Institute of Lisbon; Paris 8 University Vincennes-Saint-Denis
- Occupations: Director, journalist, documentary filmmaker, producer
- Years active: 1964–present
- Awards: Order of Prince Henry; Order of Liberty

Diana Andringa GColL (born 21 August 1947), is an Angola-born Portuguese journalist, columnist, documentary filmmaker and producer. She is best known for co-directing the Guinea-Bissau film The Two Faces of War along with Flora Gomes.

== Personal life ==
Andringa was born on 21 August 1947 in Dundo village of Chitato, Lunda-Norte, Angola. Her father was a Diamang employee, who later witnessed racism and racial segregation from the company. Therefore, she moved to Portugal in 1958 with the family and attended secondary school in Portugal. In 2013, she completed her PhD degree in Sociology of Communication at ISCTE – University Institute of Lisbon.

== Career ==
In 1964, she enrolled at the Faculty of Medicine of the University of Lisbon. But she later moved to journalism with university bulletins, in 1965. In 1967, she became a contributor to the "Diário Popular" and the "Diário de Lisboa" bulletins. In 1968, she attended the first course in Journalism implemented by the Portuguese Union of Journalists. After that, she was able to join the editorial staff of the magazine "Vida Mundial". After resigning from the post, Andringa became a marketing copywriter. However, she was arrested by PIDE, in January 1970 and sentenced to 20 months prison term due to her publicly supporting the independence of Angola.

After released from the prison, she restarted her journalist career by rejoined the "Diário de Lisboa" in 1971. In 1972, he moved to Paris and completed a course in Sociology at the Paris 8 University Vincennes-Saint-Denis. After the graduation, she returned Portugal in 1973. Then she rejoined magazine "Vida Mundial" and worked from 1976 to 1977. In 1978, he moved to television journalism and worked on many TV news and programs, such as Zoom, Triangular, Information 2, Major Reporting and Special Projects. She continued to work as a journalist at RTP until 2001, where she produced the popular program Artigo 37 aired on RTP2. In the meantime, she worked as a columnist at "Diário de Notícias", "RDP" and "Público". Then she became a short-term deputy director of "Diário de Lisboa" from 1989 to 1990.

From 1998 to 2001, he held the deputy director position of News at RTP1. From 2000 to 2001, she was the deputy director of RTP2 as well. Apart from those positions, she was part of the RTP Workers Commission from 1993 to 1998 and was the president of the Board from 1996 to 1998. From 1998 to 2001, she held the position of president of the General Assembly of the Union of Journalists. In the meantime, as a teacher, he taught at the School of Education of the Polytechnic Institute of Setúbal from 1998 to 1999 and at the School of Social Communication of the Polytechnic Institute of Lisbon from 1998 to 2001. Apart from journalist career, Andringa later became an independent documentary filmmaker. She made many critics acclaimed documentaries such as Timor-Leste, The Crocodile's Dream, The Two Faces of War, Dundo, Colonial Memory, and Tarrafal: Memories from the Campo da Morte Lenta. In 1984, she was part of the cast of the film O Lugar do Morto directed by António-Pedro Vasconcelos.

In 1997, she received Order of Prince Henry and in 2006, honored with Grand Officer of the Order of Liberty by Portuguese Order. As an author, she wrote four books: Em Defesa de Aquilino Ribeiro (1994), Demasiado! uma viagem ao mundo dos refugiados (1996), Funcionários da Verdade: Profissionalismo e Responsabilidade Social dos Jornalistas do Serviço Público de Televisão (2014) and Joaquim Pinto de Andrade, Uma Quase Autobiografia (2017). In 2017, she received the Maria Isabel Barreno Prize for her contribution toward journalism.

== Filmography ==
- 1975 - De sol a sol
- 1981 - Goa, 20 anos depois
- 1983 - Aristides de Sousa Mendes, o cônsul injustiçado
- 1985 - Iraque, o país dos dois rios
- 1994 - O Caso Big Dan's (about the Cheryl Araujo rape case)
- 1995 - Humberto Delgado: obviamente, assassinaram-no
- 1996 - Fonseca e Costa: A descoberta da vida, da luz e da liberdade, também
- 1996 - Corte de Cabelo: história de amor, Lisboa, anos 90
- 1996 - Vergílio Ferreira: retrato à minuta
- 1996 - Rómulo de Carvalho e o Seu Amigo António Gedeão
- 1997 - António Ramos Rosa - estou vivo e escrevo sol
- 1997 - Jorge de Sena - uma fiel dedicação à honra de estar vivo
- 1995 - Identificação de um País
- 1998 - José Rodrigues Miguéis: um homem do povo na história da República
- 2002 - Clandestino
- 2002 - Timor-Leste: O sonho do Crocodilo
- 2002 - Engenho e Obra: Cem anos de Engenharia em Portugal
- 2007 - Guiné-Bissau: As duas faces da guerra (co-directed with Flora Gomes)
- 2011 - Tarrafal - Memórias do Campo da Morte Lenta
- 2009 - Dundo, memória colonial
- 2015 - Operação Angola: Fugir para Lutar
