= Borne, Overijssel =

Borne
- Municipality
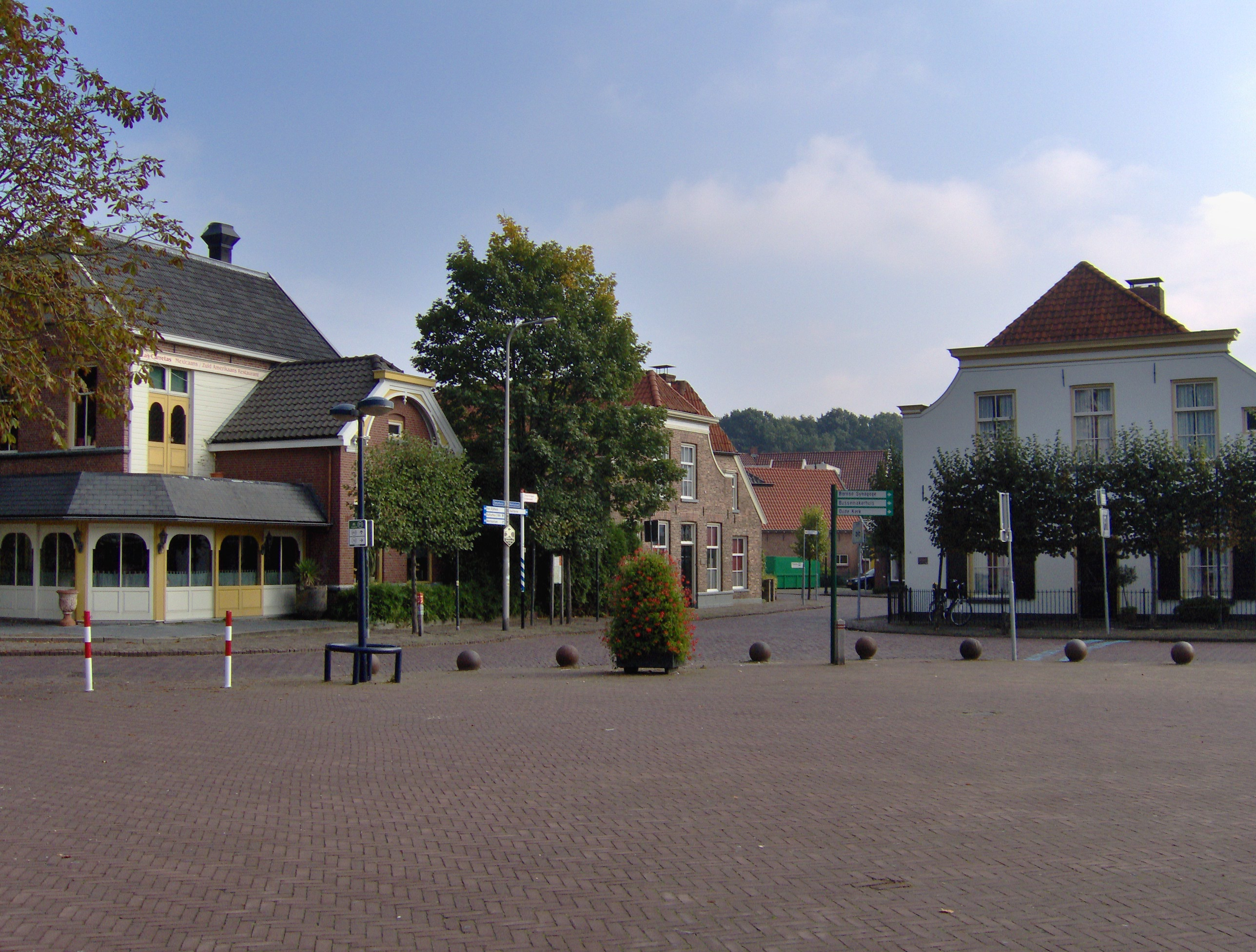
- Dorset Square in Borne

- Flag Coat of arms

- Location in Overijssel
- Coordinates: 52°18′N 6°45′E
- Country: Netherlands
- Province: Overijssel

Government
  - Body: Municipal council
  - Mayor: Jan Pierik (PvdA)

Area
  - Total: 26.16 km^{2} (10.10 sq mi)
  - Land: 26.00 km^{2} (10.04 sq mi)
  - Water: 0.16 km^{2} (0.062 sq mi)
- Elevation: 15 m (49 ft)

Population (2022)
  - Total: 23,877
  - Density: 910/km^{2} (2,400/sq mi)
- Demonym(s): Bornenaar, Borrenaar
- Time zone: UTC+1 (CET)
  - Summer (DST): UTC+2 (CEST)
- Postcode: 7620–7626
- Area code: 074
- Website: www.borne.nl

Borne (Dutch pronunciation: [ˈbɔrnə]; Tweants: Boorn) is a municipality and a town in the eastern Netherlands, in the region of Twente. Its inhabitants also have the nickname Melbuul (flour bag in Twentsch).

== History ==
The earliest traces of inhabitation in Borne are archeological finds at the "Stroom Esch" and "Zuid Esch" of substantial settlements dating from the late Iron Age and the Roman period. Finds from around 800 CE., the remains of two farmhouses and the grave of a man buried with his armour, a sword, lance and 16 silver denarii coined by Charlemagne near two farmhouses of the same age suggest inhabitation in the ninth century. The first historical mention of Borne, under the name Borghende dates from 1206 in a document which transfers churches in Steenwijk and Borne and their possessions by Fredericus, the abbot of the monastery in Ruinen to the bishop of Utrecht, Dirk van Are in return for possessions in Drenthe.

The earliest phases of Borne center around the Meijershof, which came into possession of the abbot of Ruinen in 1142.

Until the beginning of the industrial age, Borne was an agricultural community, characterised by plaggen soil and extensive cattle farming. The main crops were rye and buckwheat. Several landweren, defensive earthworks consisting or earthen walls overgrown with blackthorn (Prunus spinosa) and blackberries are still visible in the landscape.

Borne was originally the richterambt (judicial district) Borne, made up of the Marke Senderen (Zenderen) and Bi den Broeke (lit. "by the brook", Bornerbroek) and the hamlet of Hertme. In 1655 Hertme has evolved into an independent marke.

== Population centres ==
- Azelo (partly)
- Borne
- Hertme
- Zenderen

Bornerbroek, historically part of Borne, is since 2001 part of the Almelo municipality. Borne borders the municipalities of Hengelo, Hof van Twente, Dinkelland, Almelo and Tubbergen.

=== Topography ===
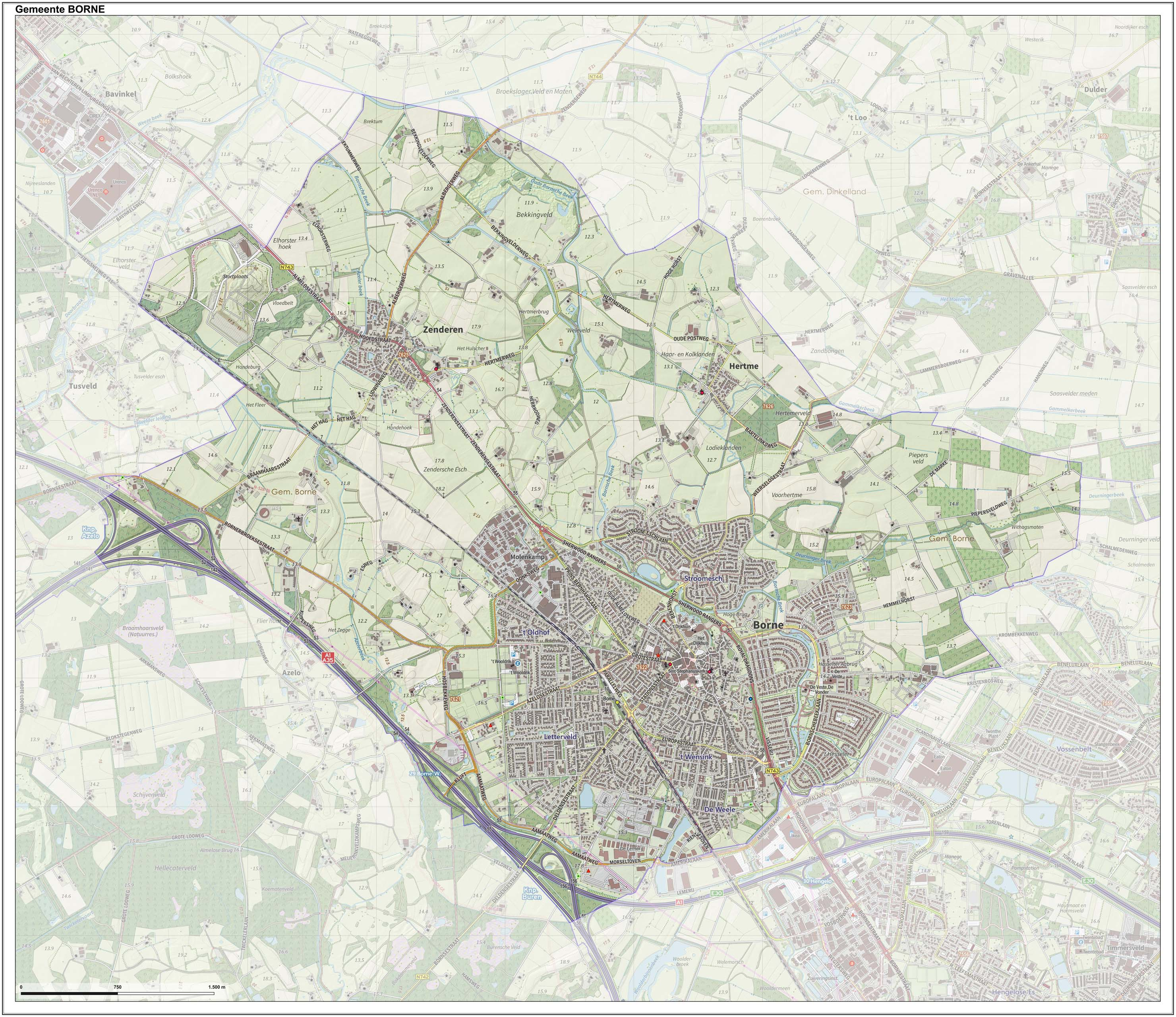

Dutch Topographic map of the municipality of Borne, June 2015.

== Twin town ==
The sister city of Borne is

- Rheine, Westphalia, Germany

== Transportation ==
- Borne railway station
- Borne is served by two motorways. The A 1 / E30 and the A 35

== Notable people ==
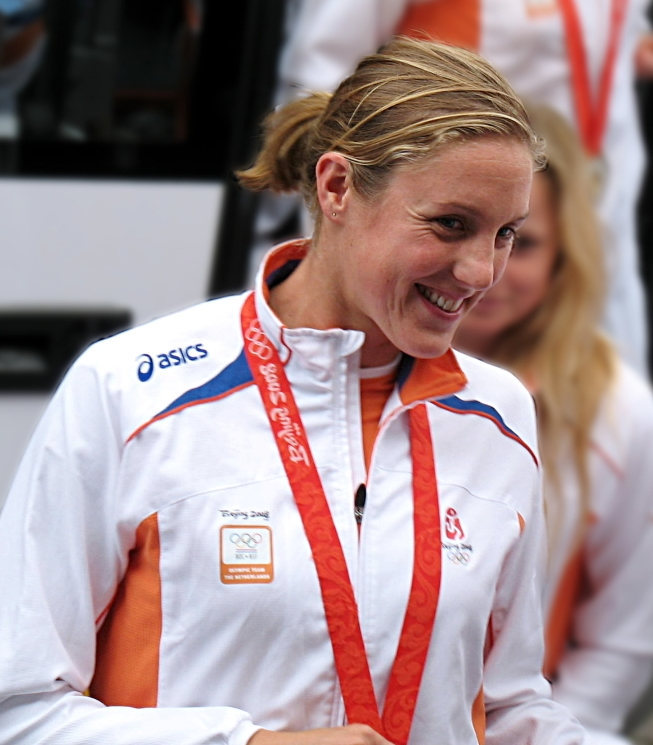
Marleen Veldhuis, 2008

- Gerrit Jan Meulenbeld (1928 in Borne - 2017) a physician-scholar who taught and published work on Indology
- Henk Nieuwkamp (born 1942 in Borne) a retired Dutch cyclist, competed at the 1968 Summer Olympics
- Pieter Omtzigt (born 1974 in The Hague, grew up in Borne), a Dutch politician
- Henny Kroeze (born 1952 in Zenderen) a retired Dutch motorcycle racer who competed in speedway
- Rob Hornstra (born 1975 in Borne) a Dutch photographer and self-publisher of documentary work about the former Soviet Union
- Marleen Veldhuis (born 1979 in Borne) a retired swimmer, multiple medal winner at four Summer Olympics from 2008 to 2012
- Mats Wieffer (born 1999 in Borne) a Dutch professional footballer who plays in the Dutch national team
- Wout Weghorst (born 1992 in Borne) a Dutch professional footballer with over 300 club appearances
- Florien Reesink (born 1998 in Borne) a Dutch professional volleyballer, playing in the German Bundesliga and Dutch national team, competed at the 2024 Summer Olympics in Paris.

== Gallery ==
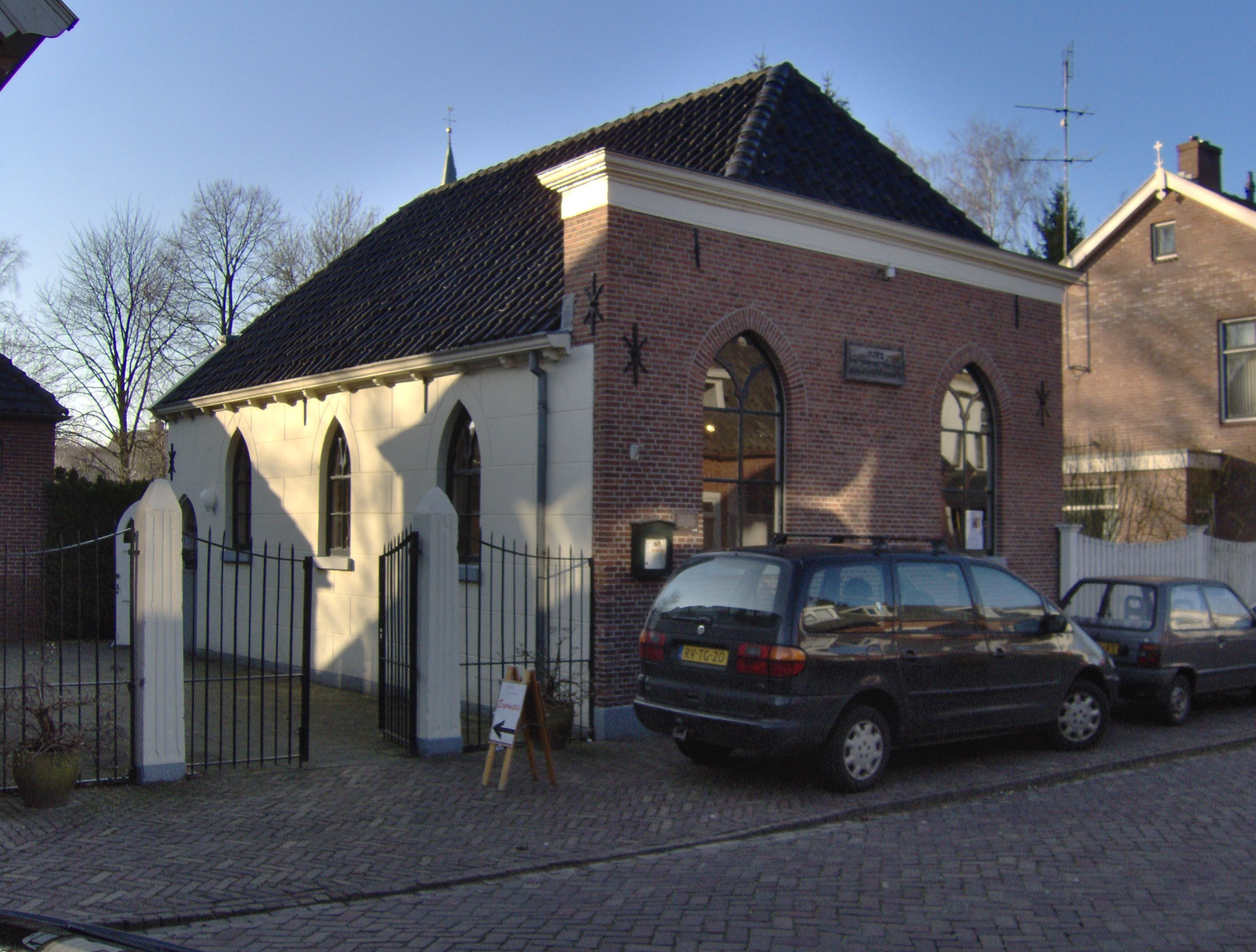
Synagoge Borne

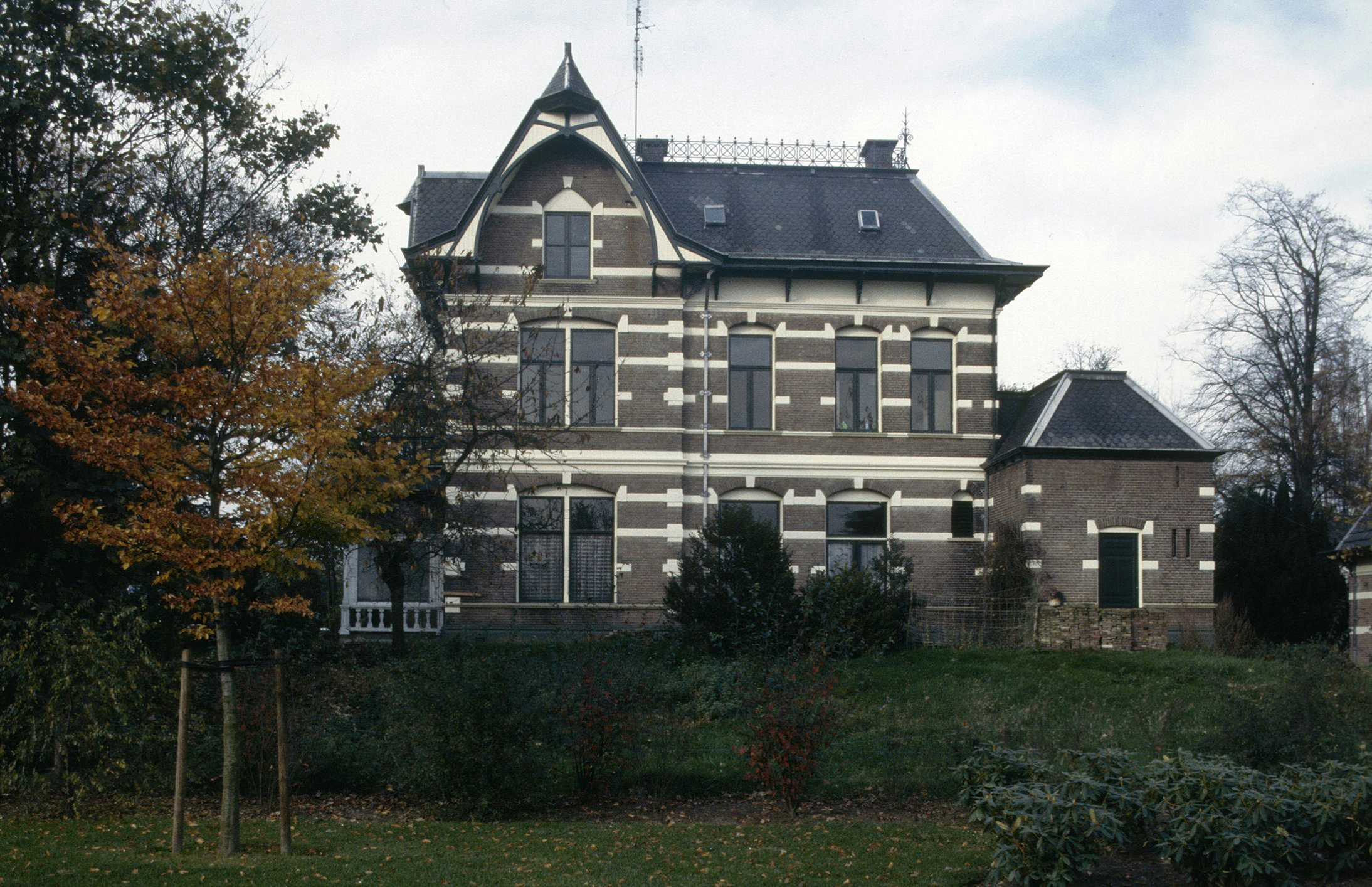
Exterieur OVERZICHT ZUIDGEVEL - Borne

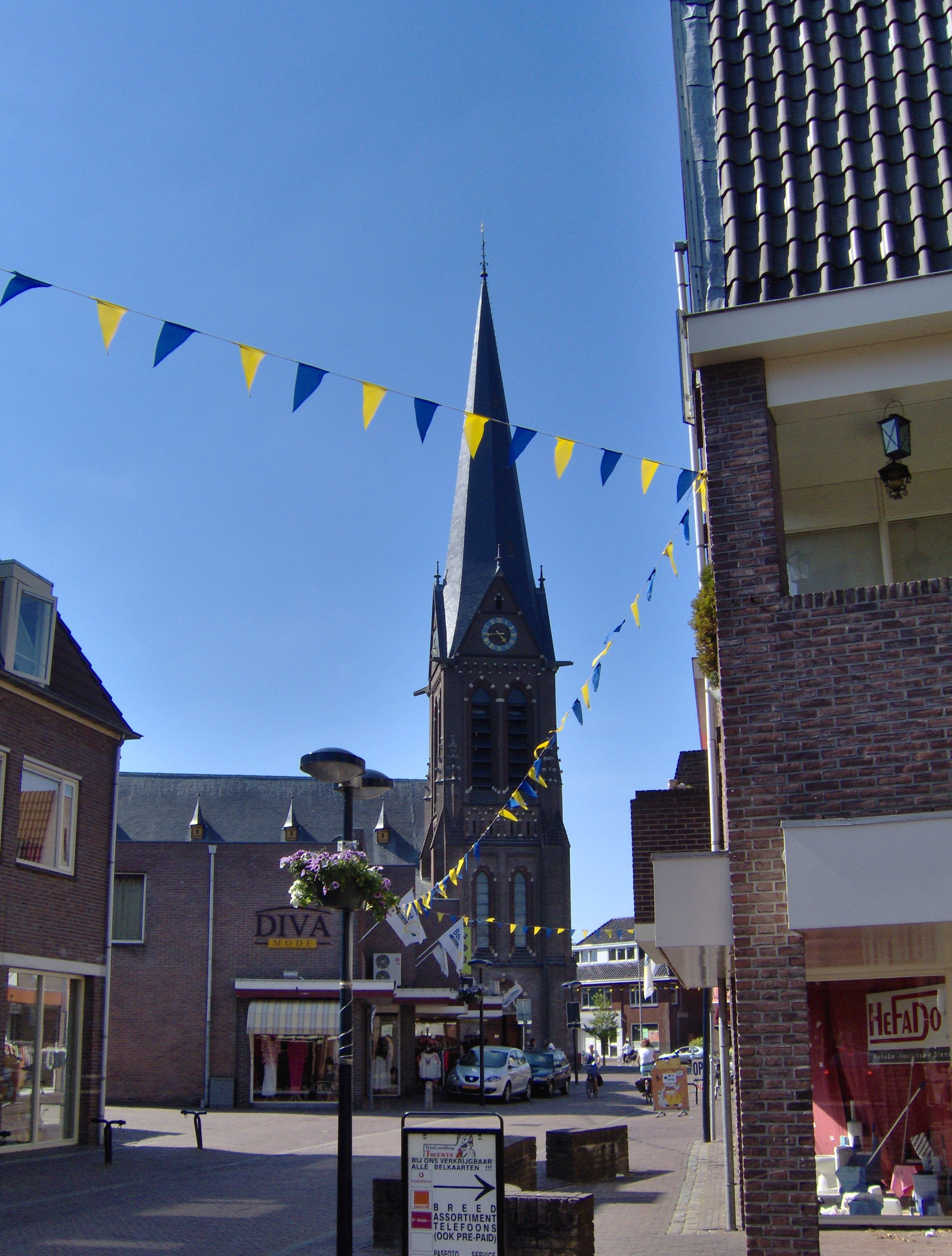
Sint Stephanuskerk Borne

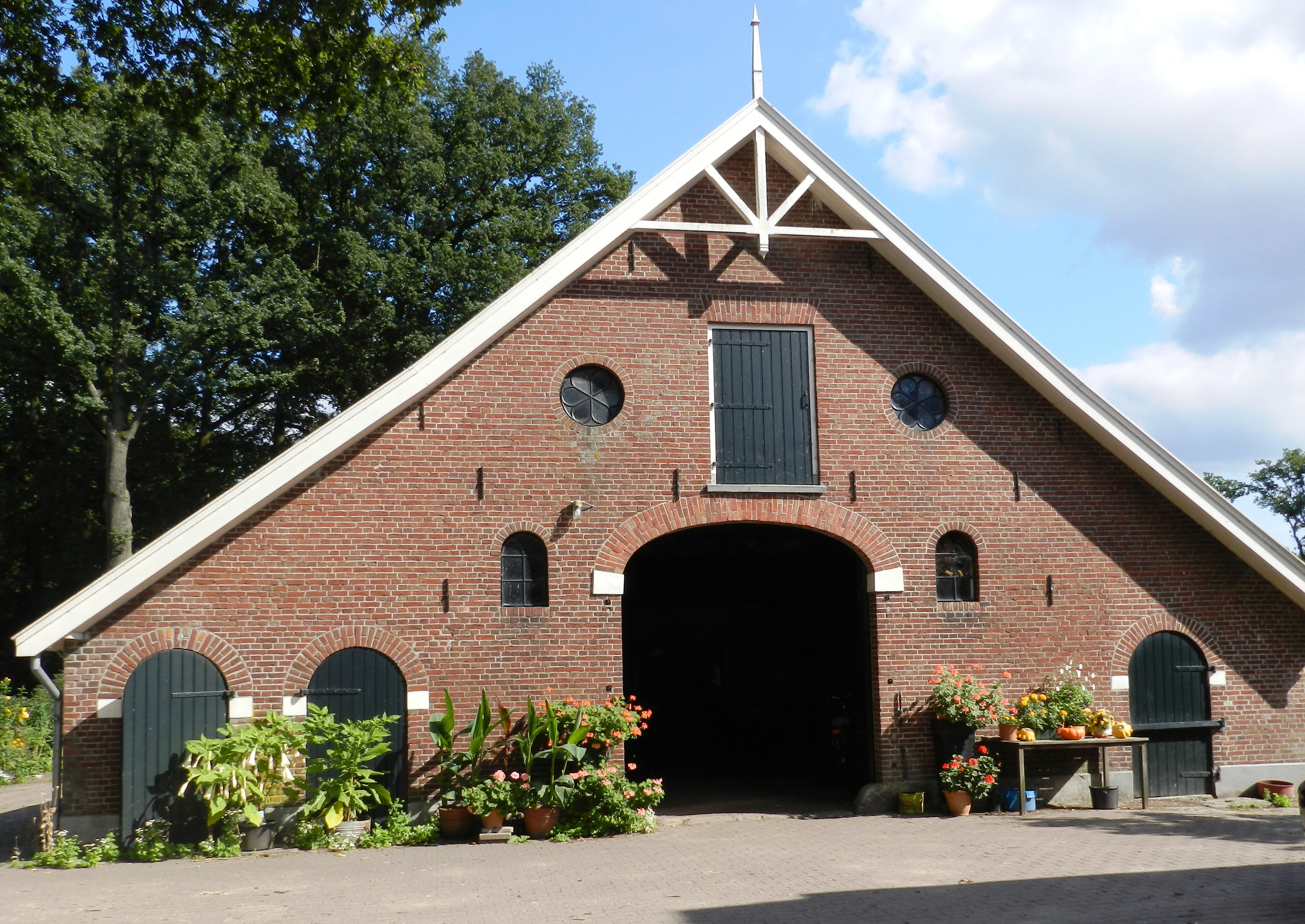
Schuur Bartelinksweg
