= Zenderen =

- Village
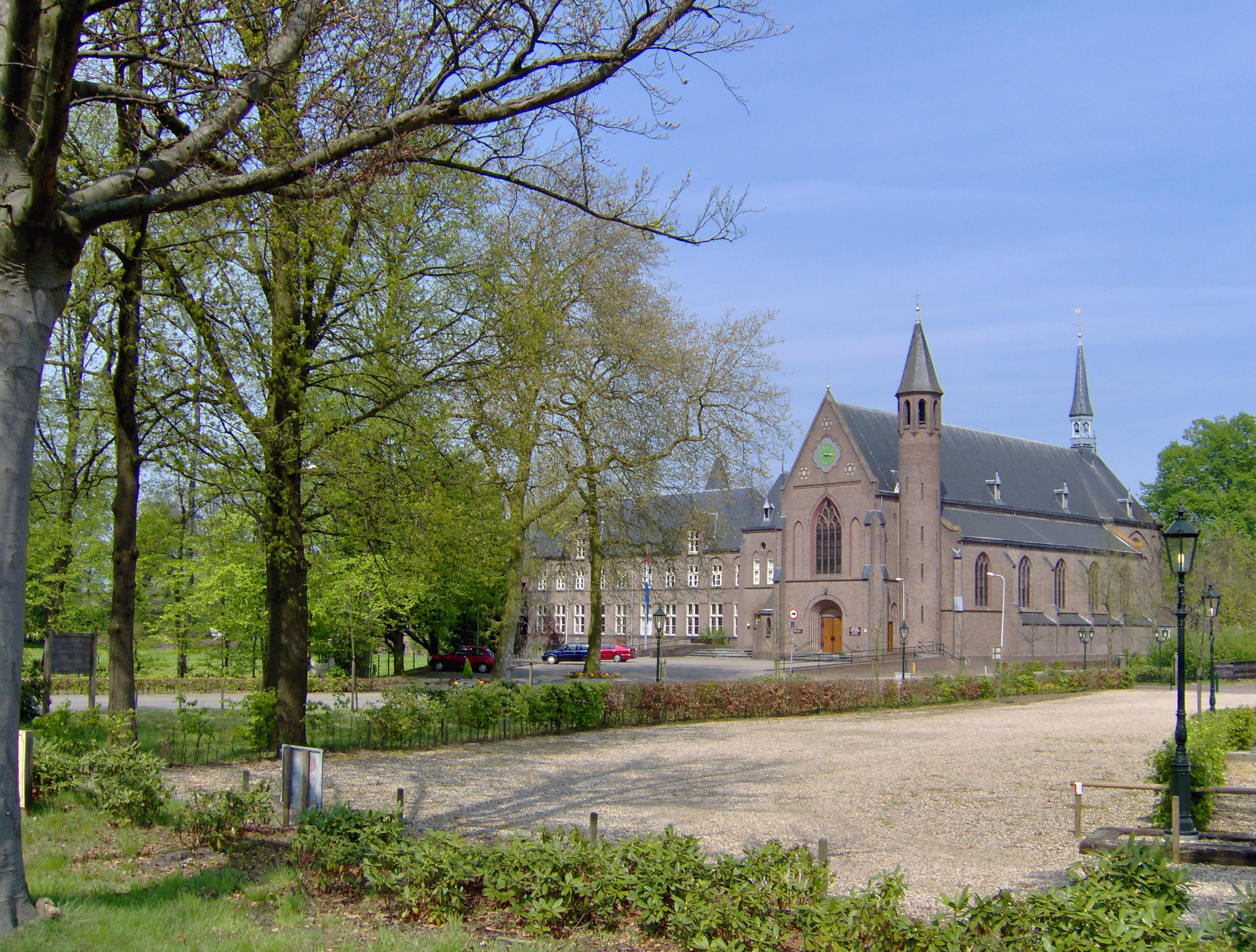
- The Carmelites monastery in Zenderen

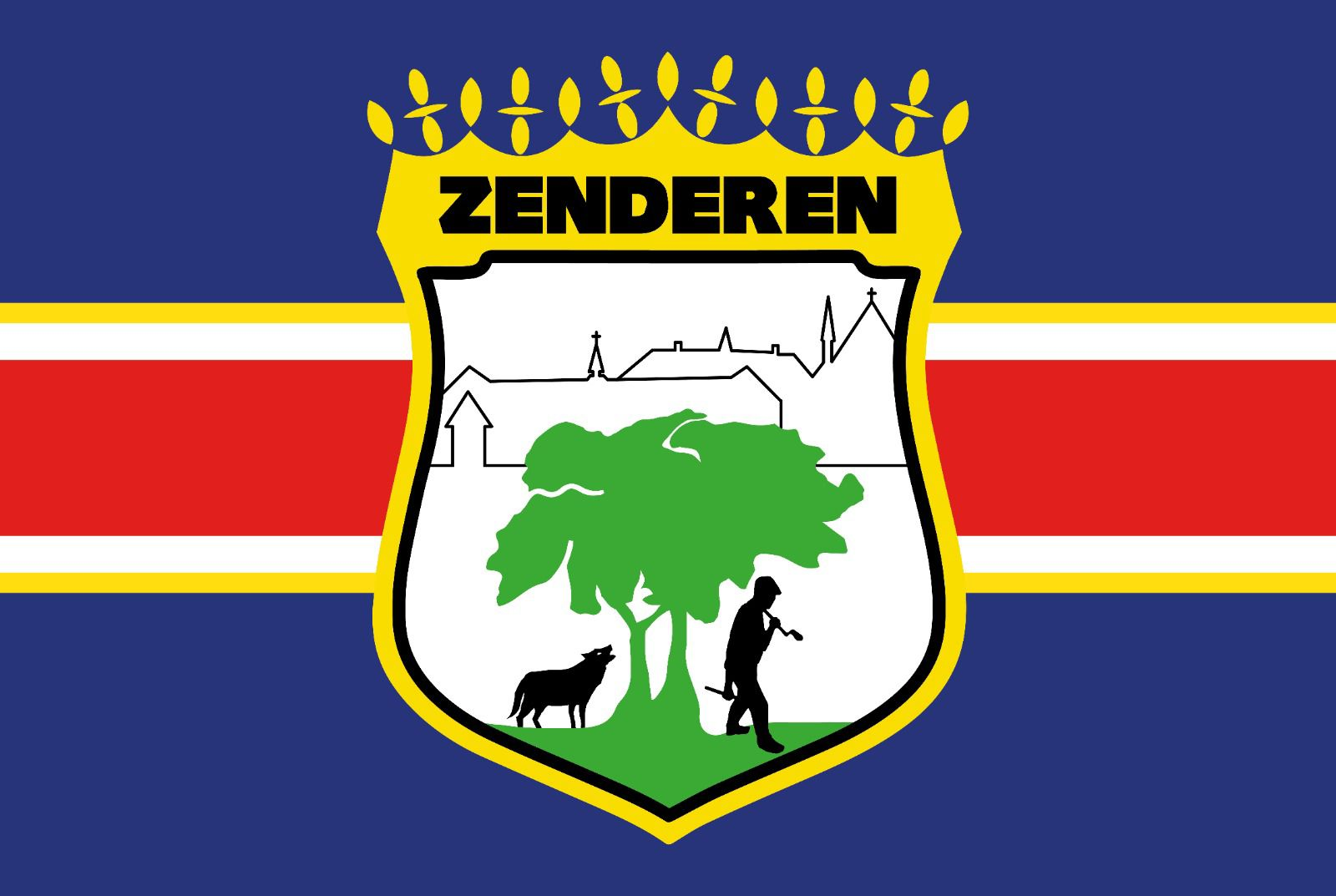
- Flag

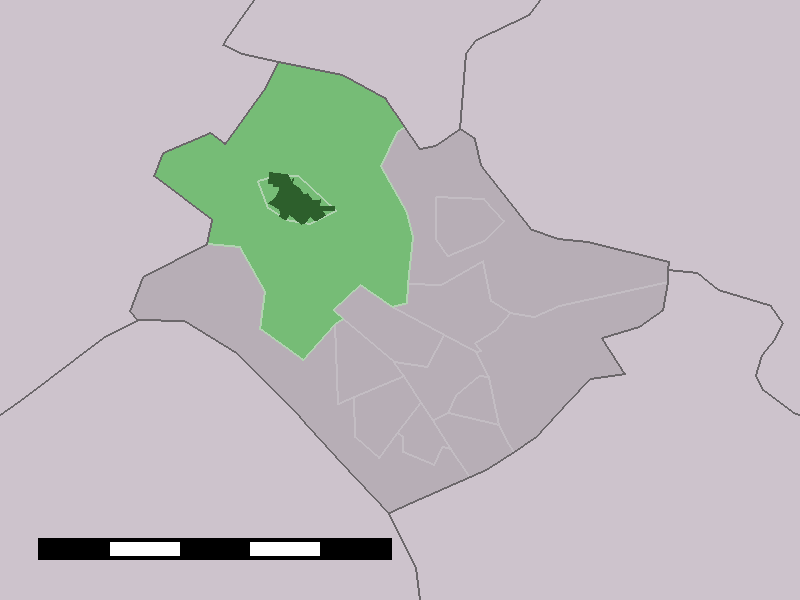
- The village centre (dark green) and the statistical district (light green) of Zenderen in the municipality of Borne.

- Location in the Netherlands Zenderen (Netherlands)
- Coordinates: 52°19′N 6°43′E
- Country: Netherlands
- Province: Overijssel
- Municipality: Borne

Area
  - Total: 8.85 km^{2} (3.42 sq mi)
- Elevation: 12 m (39 ft)

Population (2021)
  - Total: 1,245
  - Density: 141/km^{2} (364/sq mi)
- Time zone: UTC+1 (CET)
  - Summer (DST): UTC+2 (CEST)
- Postal code: 7625
- Dialing code: 074

Zenderen is a village in the Dutch province of Overijssel. It is a part of the municipality of Borne, and lies about 6 km southeast of Almelo.

== History ==
The village was first mentioned in the late-10th century as in Sindron. The etymology is unclear. Zunderen is an esdorp which started to develop after the church was built in 1798. The church was demolished in 1946.

The Carmelites monastery was founded in 1855 in Zenderen on the grounds of the former estate of Hulscher. The monastery was built in Gothic Revival style and consists of four buildings around an inner court. The eastern wing contains the St Stephanus Church which was the successor of the monastery church. Nearby a nunnery was built.

Zenderen was home to 1,232 people in 1840.
