= Manou Gallo =

Ivorian musician

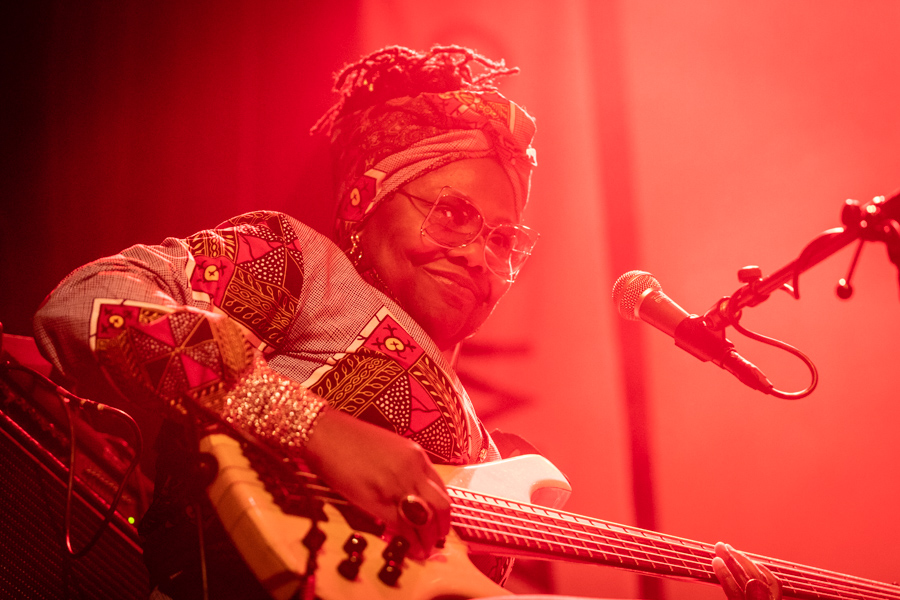
Manou Gallo during a concert in Oslo, Norway in 2018.

Manou N'Guessan Gallo (born 31 August 1972 in Divo, Côte d'Ivoire), is a West African singer, bandleader and musician of African popular music, playing the electric bass guitar.

== Life and career ==
Brought up by her grandmother, Gallo first performed at the age of 12 and went on to become a success, touring in various African countries such as Burkina Faso, Mali, Togo and Benin as well as recording four albums.

When the group Woya eventually stopped, Gallo followed Marcellin Yacé to Abidjan. He gave her her first bass guitar and taught her about recording. Between 1993 and 1996, she also performed in theatre and dance troupes as well as playing on an album by Ray Lema.

She eventually met the tour manager of Zap Mama and was offered the chance to tour with them in Europe. She performed with them for six years from 1997, and also appeared with the Tambours de Brazza.

She eventually formed her own group, Le Djiboi, and toured extensively. Her debut album, Dida, was released on the IglooMondo label in 2003, followed by Manou Gallo in 2007. In 2011, she produced and played bass with the group Mokoomba on their album Rising Tide.

Gallo sings in Dida, French and English. On her album Afro Groove Queen she collaborated with Bootsy Collins and Manu Dibango.

== Discography ==
=== Solo albums ===
- Dida (2003)
- Manou Gallo (2007)
- Lowlin (2010)
- Afro Groove Queen (2018)
- "Afro Bass Fusion" (2023)

=== Collaborations ===
- A Ma Zone (1999) with Zap Mama
- Rising Tide (2011) with Mokoomba (production and bass)
- Kalimba Gigi song, with Amir Gwirtzman on "Inhale-Exhale" album 2010
