= Flora Gomes =

Bissau-Guinean film director

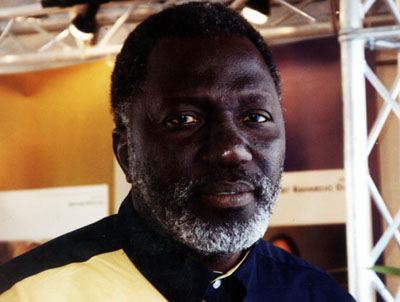
- Born: 31 December 1949 (age 76); Cadique, Guinea-Bissau
- Education: Instituto Cubano del Arte y la Industria Cinematográficos
- Occupation: film director
- Notable work: Mortu Nega

Flora Gomes is a Bissau-Guinean film director. He was born in Cadique, Guinea-Bissau on 31 December 1949 and after high school in Cuba, he decided to study film at the Instituto Cubano del Arte y la Industria Cinematográficos in Havana.

Shot fourteen years after independence, Gomes's Mortu Nega (Death Denied) (1988) was the first fiction film and the second feature film ever made in Guinea-Bissau. (The first feature film was N’tturudu, by director Umban u’Kest in 1987.) At FESPACO 1989, the film won the prestigious Oumarou Ganda Prize. Mortu Nega is in Creole with English subtitles.

In 1992, Gomes directed Udju Azul di Yonta, which was screened in the Un Certain Regard section at the 1992 Cannes Film Festival.

== Biography ==
Son of illiterate parents, as a child Gomes struggled against the limitations of his social status and the oppression of the Portuguese colonial system under António Salazar's rule. He supported Bissau-Guinean resistance against colonialism and greatly admired Amílcar Cabral. He left Guinea-Bissau to study cinema in Cuba (1972) at the Cuban Institute of Art and Cinematography, under the guidance of Santiago Álvarez. He continued his studies in Senegal, at the Senegalese Journal for Motion Picture News, under the direction of Paulin Soumanou Vieyra. He also co-directed two films with Sergio Pina and worked as an assistant with Chris Marker and Anita Fernandez.

Upon returning to liberated Guinea-Bissau, Gomes filmed his country's independence ceremony (24 September 1974), fulfilling the desire of Amílcar Cabral that it should be Bissau-Guineans themselves capturing this historical moment on film. After freeing itself from colonial rule, Guinea-Bissau was visited by many reporters and progressive filmmakers and Gomes, given his knowledge of cinema, was in great demand to assist them, which allowed him to expand his skills. At the end of the 1970s, he worked as a photographer and cameraman for the Ministry of Information.

Having first directed historical documentaries, Gomes filmed his first feature film, Mortu Nega, in 1987. Mortu Nega depicts the struggle for independence and the challenges of the first post-independence years in Guinea-Bissau. The film was screened at several international film festivals and Gomes caught the attention of commentators and critics. He was particularly well received in France, which in later years enabled him to attract funding for the production of new films. In 2000, he was distinguished in France with the title of Chevalier des Arts et des Lettres.

== Filmography ==
- 1976 - O Regresso de Cabral (short documentary)
- 1977 - A Reconstrução, co-directed with Sergio Pina (medium-length documentary)
- 1978 - Anos no Oça Luta, co-directed with Sergio Pina (short documentary)
- 1987 - Mortu Nega
- 1992 - Udju Azul di Yonta
- 1994 - A máscara (short documentary)
- 1996 - Po di Sangui
- 2002 - Nha Fala
- 2007 - As duas faces da guerra, co-directed with Diana Andringa (feature-length documentary)
- 2012 - A República Di Mininus

== Awards and accomplishments ==
=== 1988 ===
Mortu Nega won:

- Bronze Tanit at Carthage Film Festival
- Prize for best actress at Carthage Film Festival
- Prize for best film and actress at FESPACO

=== 1992 ===
Udju Azul di Yonta won:

- Bronze Tanit at Carthage Film Festival
- OAU (Organization of African Unity) prize at Carthage Film Festival
- Prize for best actress at FESPACO
- Special Jury Prize at Salonika Film Festival (Greece)

=== 1994 ===
- Distinguished with the Order of Merit for Culture by the Tunisian Government.
- Named a member of the principal jury at the Carthage Film Festival.

=== 1996 ===
- Awarded Chevalier des Arts et des Lettres by the French government.
- Po di Sangui won Silver Tanit award at Carthage Film Festival

=== 2002 ===
- Nha fala won the international prize given by the French Bourse for the best film from the South.
- Nha fala also won the best Latin film award at the unofficial Venice Film Festival.
- Nha fala won the city prize at the Amiens International Film Festival (France).
- Flora Gomes was recognized in Portugal by the Bissau-Guinean community for his services in making the Bissau-Guinean culture known worldwide.

=== 2003 ===
- Nha fala won the Grand Prize at the Vie d’Afrique Festival in Montreal.
- Nha fala won the Grand Prize for a feature film at FESPACO from the ECOWAS parallel jury.

=== 2004 ===
- Flora Gomes was a member of the jury at the Amiens International Film Festival.

=== 2005 ===
- Was chosen as president of the ECOWAS jury at FESPACO.
- Was recognized by the University of Lisbon, receiving a medal celebrating the universality of his work.
- Was a panelist at the second Brown University Africana Film Festival.

=== 2006 ===
- Was a visiting artist/professor at the Department of Africana Studies at Brown University.
