= Hertme =

- Village
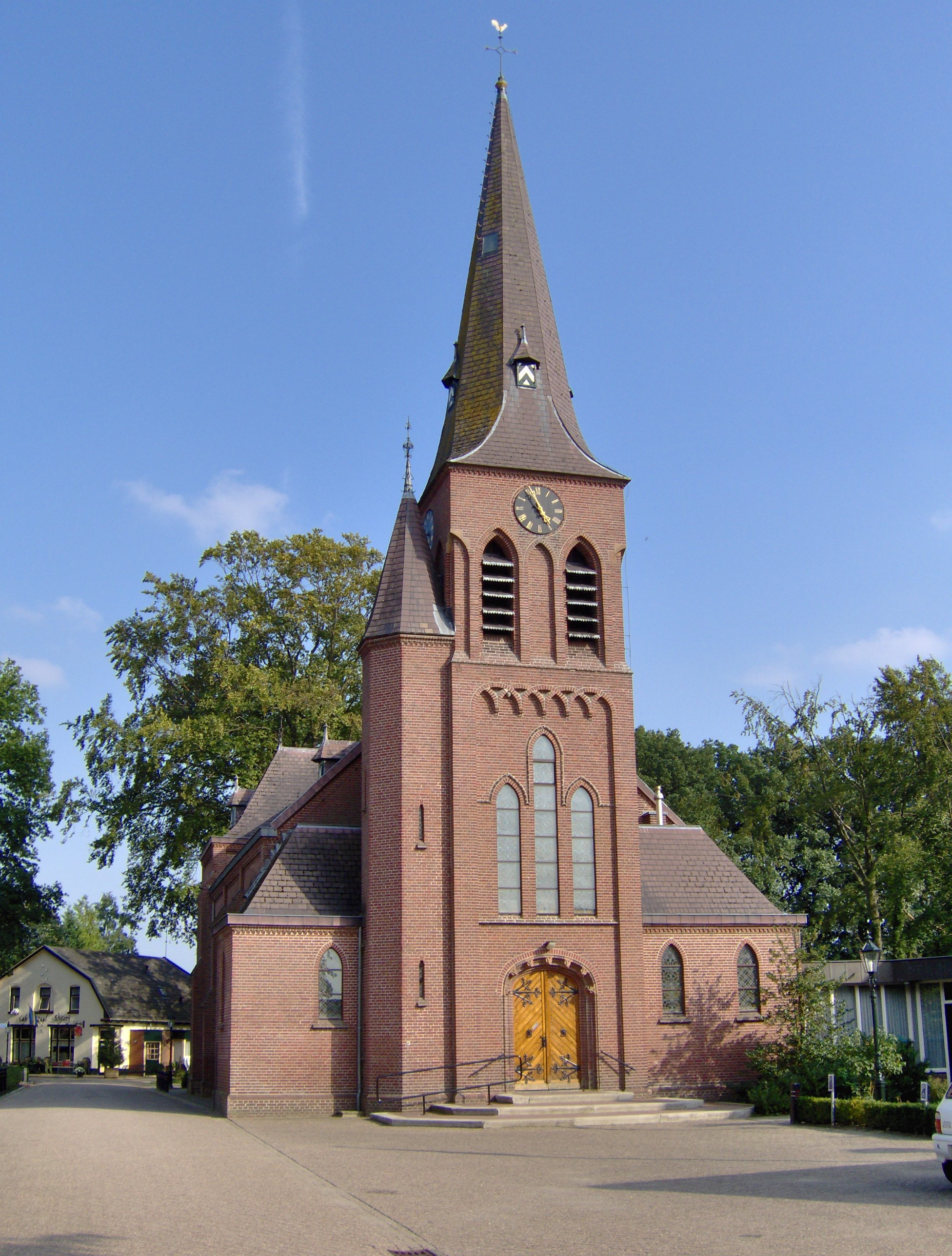
- The Saint Stephanus Church of Hertme

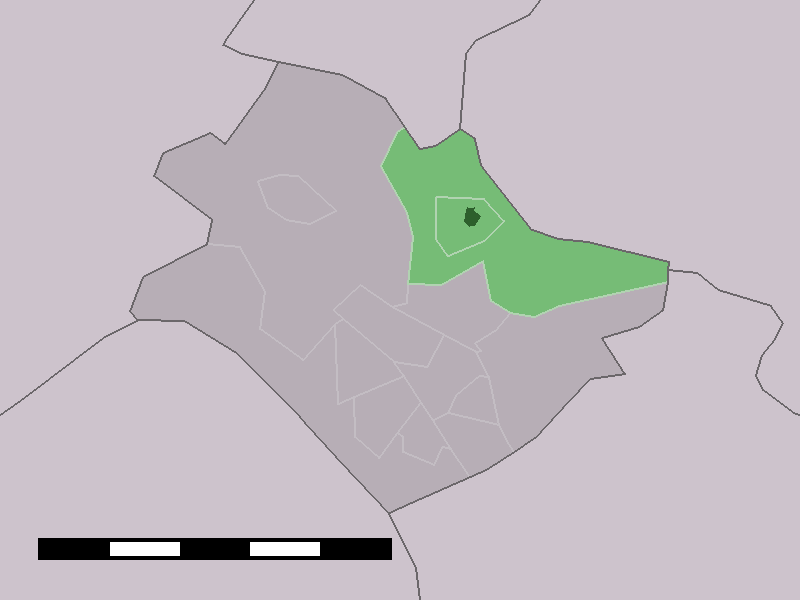
- The town centre (dark green) and the statistical district (light green) of Hertme in the municipality of Borne.

- Location in the province of Overijssel Hertme (Netherlands)
- Coordinates: 52°19′N 6°45′E
- Country: Netherlands
- Province: Overijssel
- Municipality: Borne

Area
  - Total: 4.87 km^{2} (1.88 sq mi)
- Elevation: 13 m (43 ft)

Population (2021)
  - Total: 540
  - Density: 110/km^{2} (290/sq mi)
- Time zone: UTC+1 (CET)
  - Summer (DST): UTC+2 (CEST)
- Postal code: 7626
- Dialing code: 074

Hertme is a village in the Dutch province of Overijssel. It is a part of the municipality of Borne, and lies about 7 km north of Hengelo.

Hertme has its own church and a restaurant called 'Hertme’s Ambacht.' The village also has a music club, a school named St. Aegidius School with roughly 80 pupils, and a hotel.

The Open Air Theater, built in 1955 for the local passion plays, has been the site of an annual African Music Festival since 1990. The Afrikafestival Hertme Youtube channel had 468,000 subscribers in 2020.

== Gallery ==
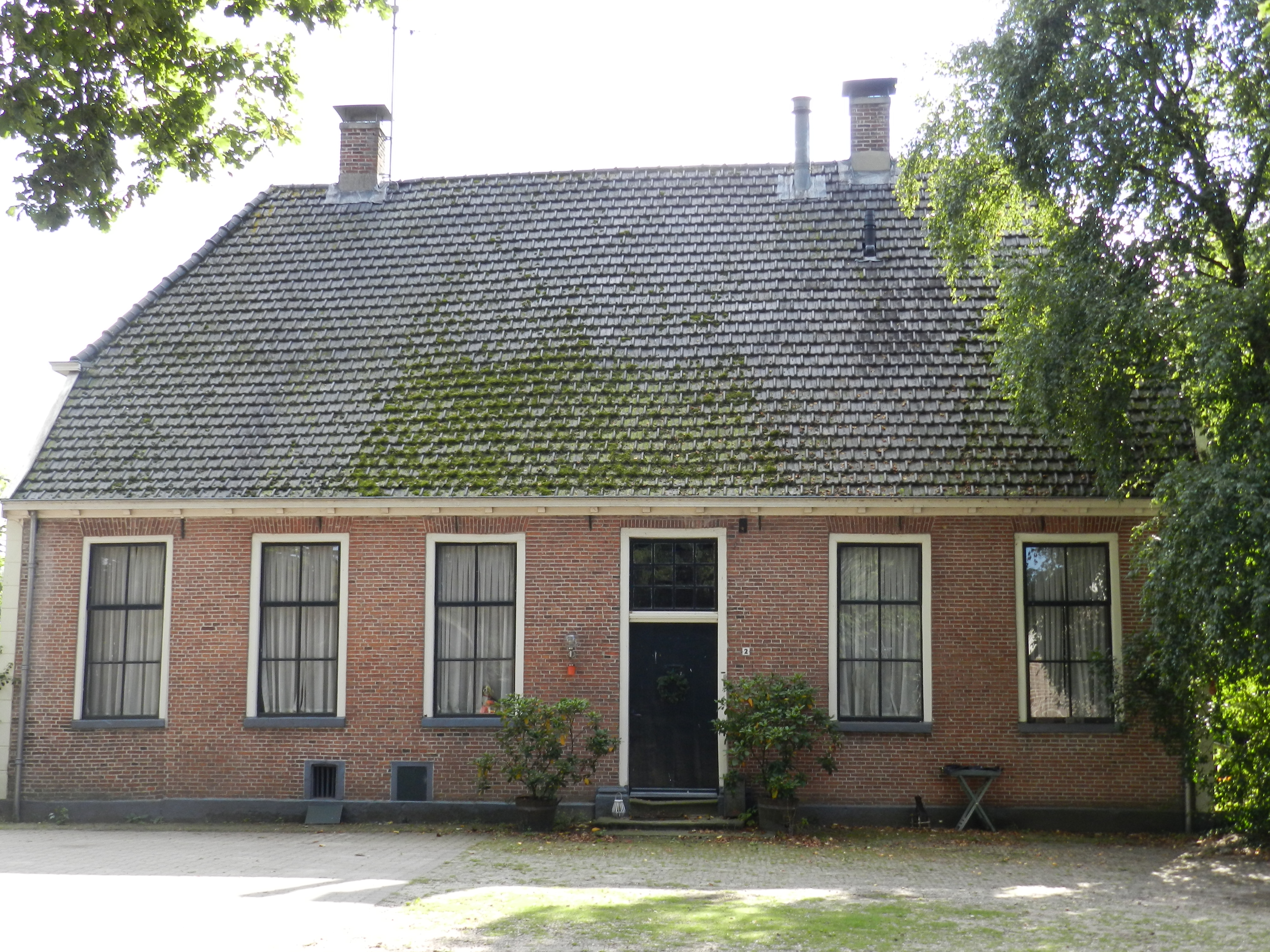
Farm in Hertme

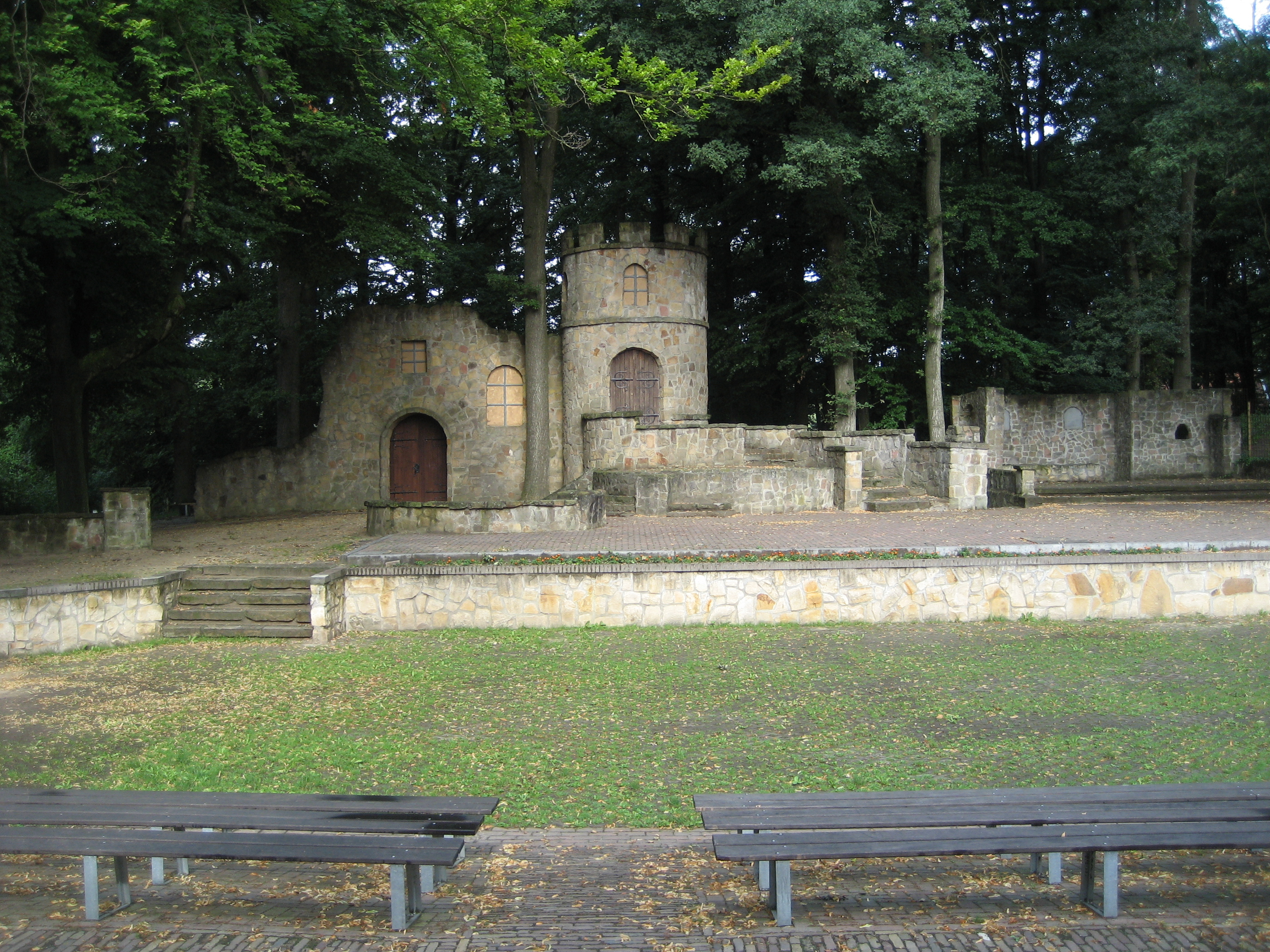
Open Air Theatre
