= The Two Faces of War =

The Two Faces of War (As duas faces da guerra in Portuguese) is a 2007 Portuguese documentary film directed by Diana Andringa and Flora Gomes. The film was shot in Guinea-Bissau, Cape Verde and Portugal. The film includes a series of interviews and testimonies of people who lived through the period of the anti-colonial war and liberation in Guinea-Bissau.

== Content ==
The documentary consists of interviews with veterans and leaders from Portugal, Guinea-Bissau and Cape Verde. Those countries lived through the conflict spanning from 1963 to 1974, a conflict between the PAIGC (African Party for the Independence of Guinea-Bissau and Cape Verde) and Portuguese troops.

In 1995, Diana Andringa, visited the town of Geba as a reporter and there she found a stone half-destroyed in the name of the Portuguese soldiers killed on African soil. This was the starting point for this work. Along with Flora Gomes, they produced a documentary which is the result of the points of view of Portugal and Guiné, about one of the bloodiest conflicts suffered during the Portuguese Colonial War.

For six weeks, Diana Andringa and Flora Gomes traveled through the regions of Mansoa, Geba, and Guilegar in Guinea-Bissau, Cape Verde and Portugal where they collected the testimonies of people who lived through the colonial war.

Throughout the documentary we see an homage to Amílcar Cabral, founder of the PAIGC. The testimonies show the magnitude of Cabral who, despite being in the middle of the conflict between the two countries, has never ceased to feel to the Portuguese people as something of their own. It is the "paired adventure" of independence war in former colonies and the rise of democracy in Portugal that Andringa and Flora want to tell through the voices of those who lived through the conflict. Diana Andringa and Flora Gomes are the narrators of the documentary. The soundtrack is made up of music from Portuguese, Guinea and Cape Verde from the featured period.

== See also ==
- PAIGC, political party founded on September 19, 1956 by Amílcar Cabral,
