= Bornerbroek =

Bornerbroek Boornerbrook
- Village
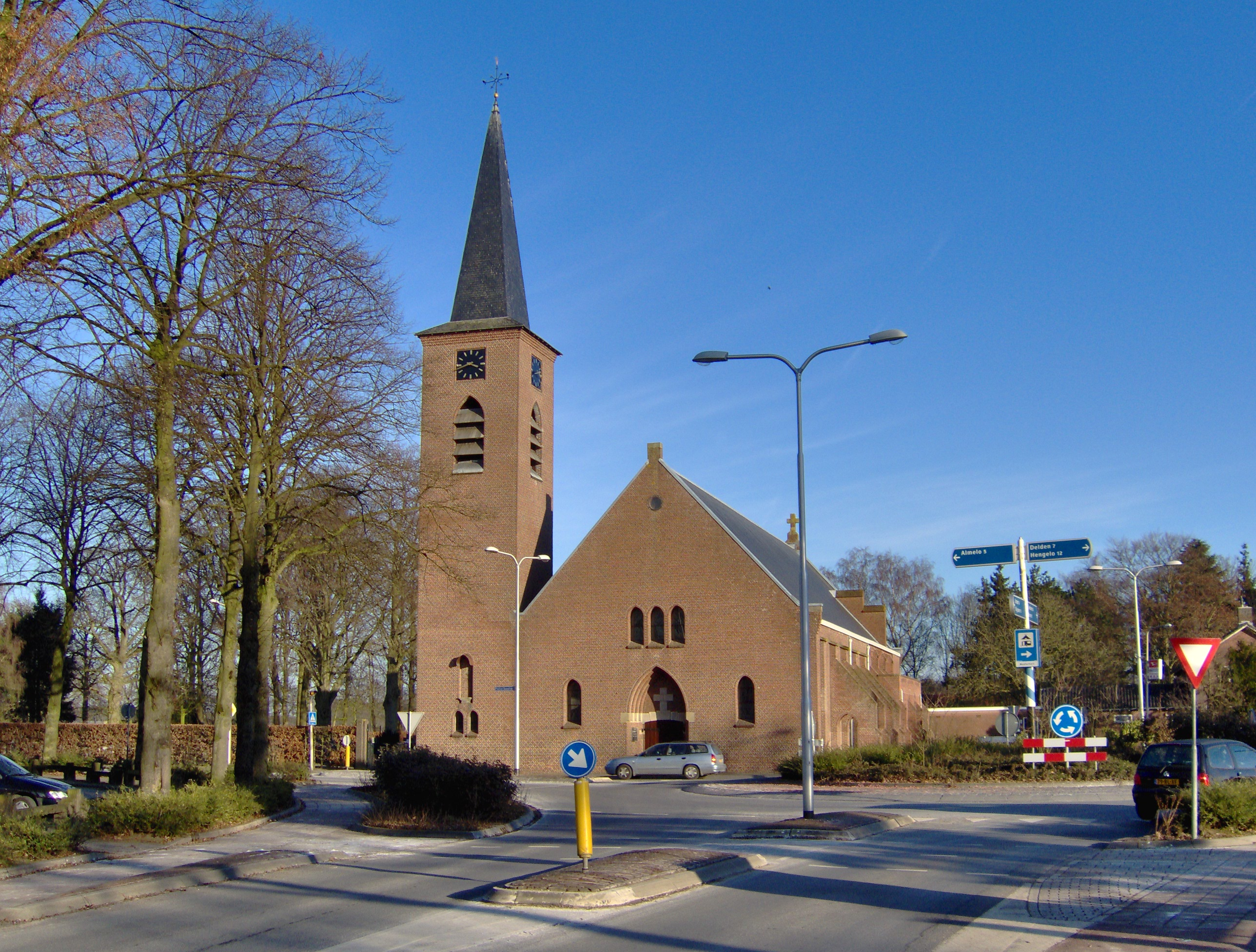
- The Roman Catholic St. Stephanus church in the middle of Bornerbroek

- Location in the Netherlands Bornerbroek (Netherlands)
- Coordinates: 52°18′32″N 6°39′19″E
- Country: Netherlands
- Province: Overijssel
- Municipality: Almelo

Area
  - Total: 15.58 km^{2} (6.02 sq mi)
- Elevation: 10 m (33 ft)

Population (2021)
  - Total: 1,970
  - Density: 126/km^{2} (327/sq mi)
- Demonym(s): Bornerbroekers, Brookers
- Time zone: UTC+1 (CET)
  - Summer (DST): UTC+2 (CEST)
- Postal code: 7627
- Dialing code: 074
- Website: www.bornerbroek.com

Bornerbroek (Dutch pronunciation: [ˌbɔrnərˈbruk]) (Low Saxon: Boornerbrook) is a church village in the municipality of Almelo in Twente, the Dutch province of Overijssel. Up to the municipal reorganisation of 1 January 2001, the village was part of the municipality of Borne.

== History ==
The village was first mentioned in 1475 as Bornerbroeck, and means "swampy land near Borne". The suffix -broek in the village name is a reference to a marsh in the vicinity of the village.

Bornerbroek was home to 570 people in 1840. The current St Stephen's church was built in 1857. It has a tower with a constricted spire. It was remodelled in Gothic Revival style in 1919–1920 by Alexander Kropholler.
