= Minyeshu =

Ethiopian singer

Minyeshu Minyeshu Kifle Tedla
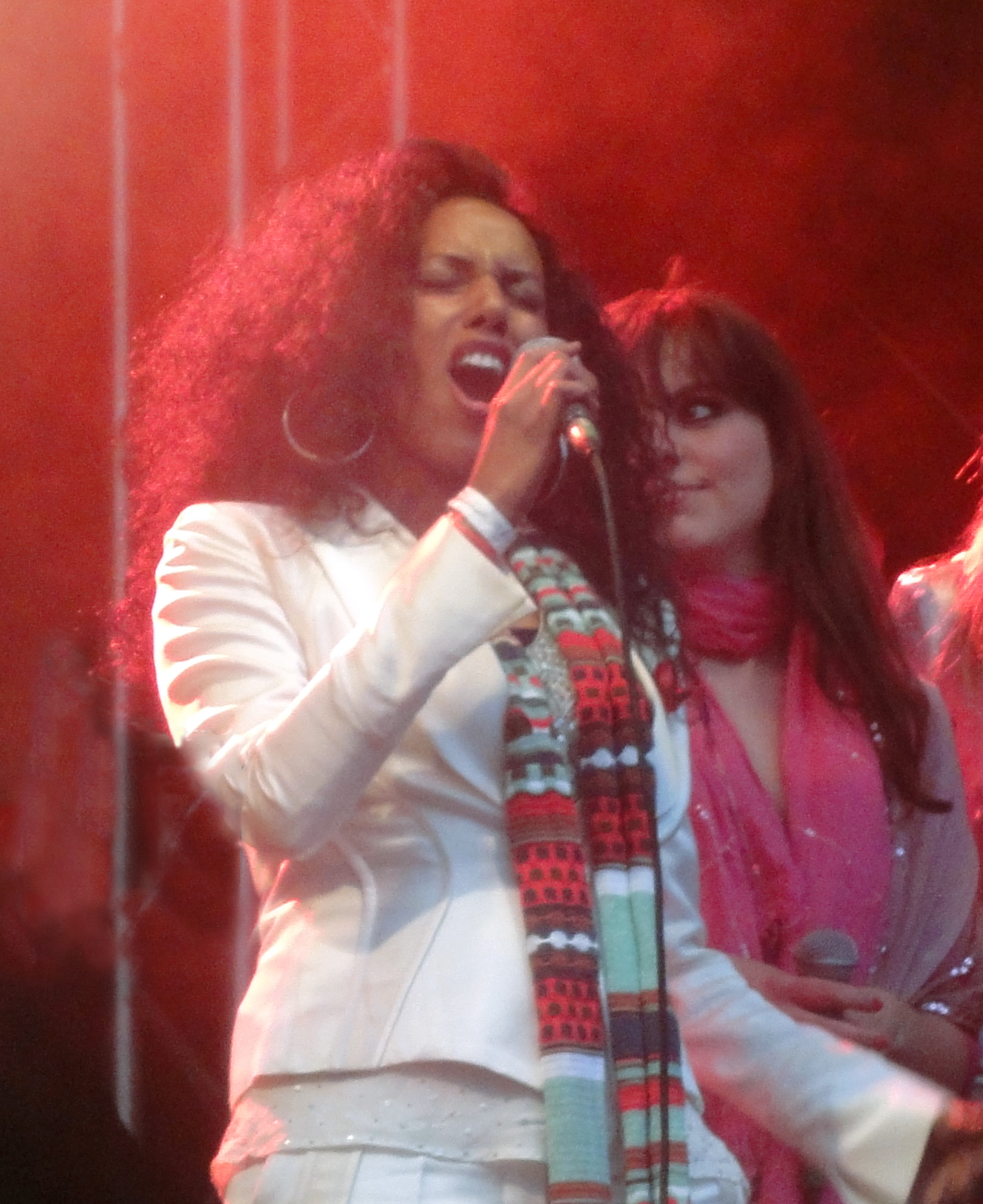
- Minyeshu performing at a Liberationfestival in The Hague, 2012

Background information
- Origin: Dire Dawa, Ethiopia (Note: Minyeshu's website specifies Adama as her birthplace.)
- Genres: Ethiopian music; world
- Occupations: Singer, dancer
- Instrument: Vocals
- Website: http://www.minyeshu.nl

Minyeshu Kifle Tedla (Amharic: ምንይሹ ክፍሌ ተድላ) is an Ethiopian singer and dancer. She lives in Eindhoven in the Netherlands. She is a member of the band Chewata.

== Biography ==
Born in the Eastern Ethiopian city of Dire Dawa to Amhara parents, Minyeshu moved to the capital Addis Ababa at the age of 9. She visited a live concert for the first time with a friend when she was 14. Right after, she auditioned and was hired as a singer in a band. At age 16 She was accepted as a dancer in the Ethiopian National Theatre. Her parents disapproved her ambitions to become an artist, and she soon began living with her aunt instead.

As part of the National Theatre, she toured abroad. With the arrival of the new EPRDF government in 1991, the board of the National Theatre was fired and for political reasons censorship was imposed on certain performances. Minyeshu described her experience in an interview ‘‘the board was replaced by people who didn't know what they were doing; a terrible situation where we as artists were degraded to puppets of the regime’’

In addition to dancing, Minyeshu also kept singing, with the band Ambassel in particular. In 1996 she traveled with this band to Europe for a few shows. Due to safety concerns back in Ethiopia, she decided to claim asylum in Belgium.

In 1998 San Graatsma a Dutchmen behind the Mosaique Vivant foundation, after hearing Minyeshu sing invited her to join the group Africa-Unite as vocalist. The Africa-Unite group consisted of musicians from Ethiopia, Sudan and Somalia. They released the cd Africa-Unite under Mosaique Vivant. Minyeshu soon afterwards moved to Eindhoven, and some time later together with former members of Africa-Unite group decided to form their own band, Chewata. Married to Eric van de Lest who also worked with her as being the co- producer/songwriter /drummer on the albums "Dire Dawa" (2012) ,"Daa-Dee"(2018) and "Netsa" (2012).

In 2003 she performed with Marco Borsato in the Friends for War Child concert. She sang in different intercultural collaborations: with Zoumana Diarra and Anton Goudsmit in the project Maliblu, and with Marlène Dorcén en Talike in Perles d'Amour. At the 2007 New Year's concert Minyeshu performed with the Nederlands Blazers Ensemble in the Concertgebouw in Amsterdam.

She combines traditional elements from the Horn of Africa with influences from modern western music. Some of her songs are based on the rhythms of Eskista, an Ethiopian ‘‘schoulder dance.’’ Her mother tongue is Amharic, but she also sings in other African languages such as Sidama. When asked in an interview whether she can sings all those languages smoothly, she answered; ‘‘I can really only speak Amharic, but not all my friends are Amharas, so the other languages are translated for me, and i enjoy performing songs in their languages as well.’’

In 2011 Minyeshu came in contact with Stefan Kruger and Stefan Schmid from (Zuco 103) Ensemble and guitarist Paul Willemsen (Lefties Soul Connection), started a collaboration that would lead to the release of the album Black Ink in 2013. In the summer of 2013 during the project 'Azalai' Minyeshu performed in the Melkweg, Amsterdam Open Air, the Sfinks Festival in Antwerpen, the Exit Festival in Novi Sad and Sziget Festival in Budapest.

In 2023 she appeared with her new 11 piece band at the North Sea Jazz Festival.

== Albums ==
With Chewata: / Minyeshu

- 2002: Meba
- 2008: Dire Dawa
- 2013: Black Ink
- 2018: Daa Dee
- 2022 Netsa https://www.arcmusic.co.uk/blog/netsa-minyeshu.html
