= Harare International Festival of the Arts =

Arts festival in Zimbabwe

The Harare International Festival of the Arts (HIFA) is one of Africa's largest international arts festivals. Established in 1999 by Manuel Bagorro the festival takes place each year in late April or early May in Harare, the capital of Zimbabwe. The week-long festival encompasses five principal disciplines: theatre, music, dance, fine art, and poetry.

== Operating in a difficult environment ==
Organizing and facilitating a festival the size of HIFA in the difficult sociopolitical and economic conditions that characterize Zimbabwe today is no easy task. 2008 was a particularly difficult year for the Festival, with controversial elections and hyperinflation, which ultimately led to the collapse of the Zimbabwean Dollar, providing an unsettling backdrop.

== Funding ==
As a private endeavour, HIFA depends on funding from private sources, including local businesses and multinational corporations. Further supplementary funding comes from donors, and embassy missions represented in Harare. Funding from embassies and missions is largely used to facilitate artists from their respective countries. Other revenue sources include fees collected from ticket sales from the different shows run during HIFA week.

== Themes ==
As a private endeavour, HIFA depends on funding from private sources, including local businesses and multinational corporations. Further supplementary funding comes from donors, and embassy missions represented in Harare. Funding from embassies and missions is largely used to facilitate artists from their respective countries. Other revenue sources include fees collected from ticket sales from the different shows run during HIFA week.

Year	Theme
1999	-
2000	-
2001	-
2002	Cancelled.
2003	Renew!
2004	-
2005	-
2006	Hand in Hand
2007	It's Show Time!
2008	The Art of Determination
2009	Enligh10ment
2010	About Face
2011	The Engagement Party
2012	A Show of Spirit
2013	What's Next ...
2014	Switch On
2015	Articulate
2016	Cancelled.
2017	Staging an Intervention
2018	We Count
2019	Cancelled.
