= Demographics of Guinea-Bissau =

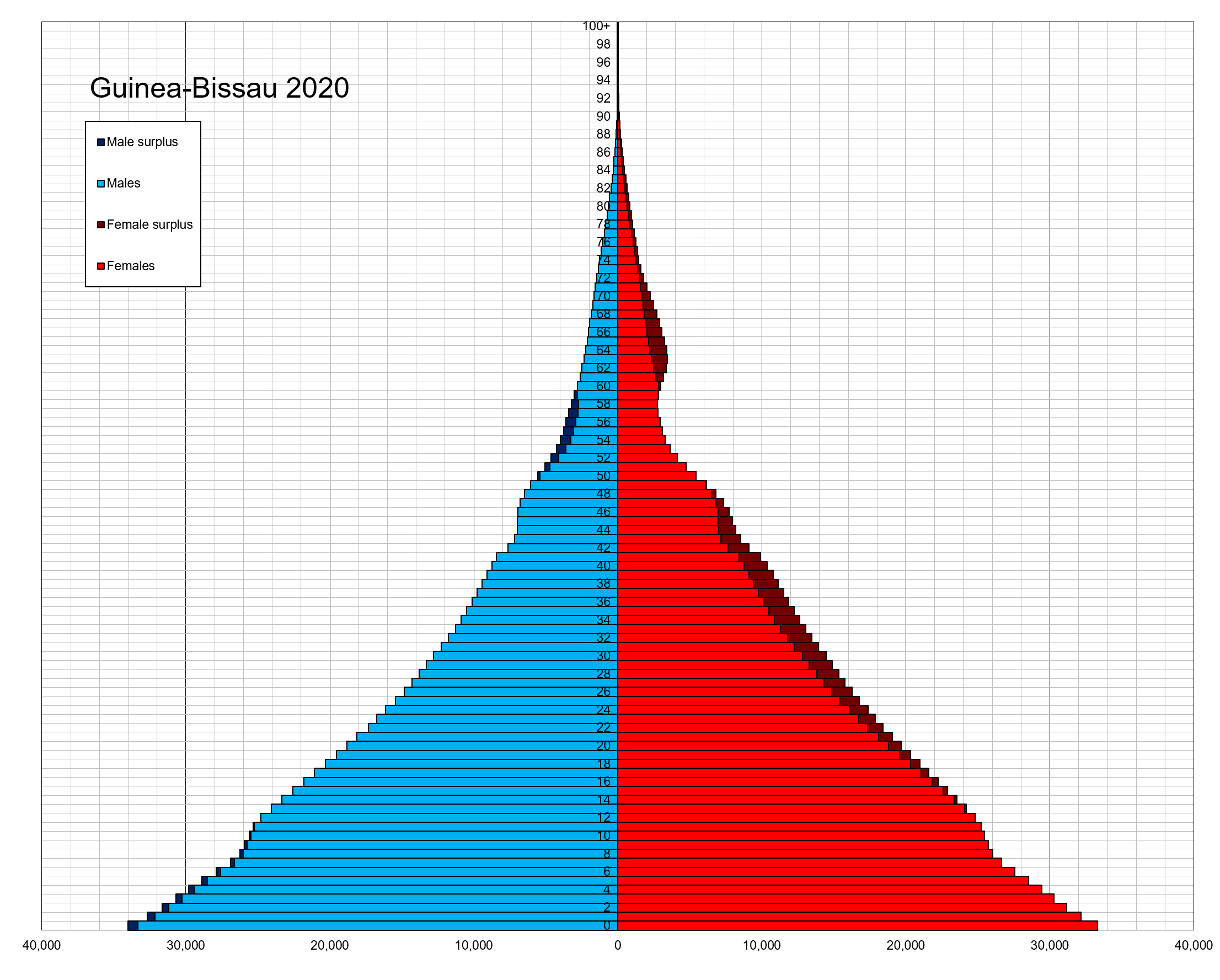
- Population pyramid of Guinea-Bissau in 2020
- Population: 2,026,778 (2022 est.)
- Growth rate: 2.53% (2022 est.)
- Birth rate: 36.45 births/1,000 population (2022 est.)
- Death rate: 7.5 deaths/1,000 population (2022 est.)
- Life expectancy: 63.68 years
  - male: 61.45 years
  - female: 65.99 years
- Fertility rate: 4.69 children born/woman (2022 est.)
- Infant mortality rate: 49.05 deaths/1,000 live births
- Net migration rate: -3.63 migrant(s)/1,000 population (2022 est.)

Age structure
- 0–14 years: 43.17%
- 65 and over: 3.08%

Sex ratio
- Total: 0.96 male(s)/female (2022 est.)
- At birth: 1.03 male(s)/female
- Under 15: 1.01 male(s)/female
- 65 and over: 0.7 male(s)/female

Nationality
- Nationality: Bissau-Guinean

Language
- Official: Portuguese

Guinea-Bissau's population between 1960 and 2017.

This is a demography of the population of Guinea-Bissau including population density, ethnicity, education level, health of the populace, economic status, religious affiliations and other aspects of the population.

== Population ==
According to the 2025 revision of The World Factbook the total population was 2,132,325 in 2024. The proportion of children below the age of 14 in 2020 was 43.17%, 53.75% was between 15 and 65 years of age, while 3.08% was 65 years or older. The proportion of the population below the age of 15 in 2010 was 41.3%, 55.4% were aged between 15 and 65 years of age, while 3.3% were aged 65 years or older.

	Total population	Population aged 0–14 (%)	Population aged 15–64 (%)	Population aged 65+ (%)
1950	518 000	38.8	57.6	3.6
1955	566 000	41.9	54.9	3.2
1960	593 000	41.3	55.7	3.0
1965	598 000	41.3	55.6	3.1
1970	603 000	37.0	59.7	3.3
1975	694 000	41.0	55.7	3.3
1980	835 000	42.1	54.4	3.5
1985	922 000	45.4	51.1	3.5
1990	1 017 000	43.8	52.8	3.5
1995	1 125 000	44.1	52.6	3.4
2000	1 241 000	43.1	53.6	3.3
2005	1 368 000	42.4	54.4	3.2
2010	1 515 000	41.3	55.4	3.3
2020	1 927 104	43.2	53.8	3.1

Population Estimates by Sex and Age Group (01.VII.2019) (Data refer to national projections.):

Age group	Male	Female	Total	%
Total	790 873	813 688	1 604 561	100
0–4	137 507	131 104	268 611	16.74
5–9	125 195	118 976	244 171	15.22
10–14	91 543	90 827	182 370	11.37
15–19	85 443	84 441	169 884	10.59
20–24	72 130	70 537	142 667	8.89
25–29	67 422	69 259	136 681	8.52
30–34	54 779	60 638	115 417	7.19
35–39	46 871	55 153	102 024	6.36
40–44	30 186	34 773	64 959	4.05
45–49	25 238	30 395	55 633	3.47
50–54	17 056	20 282	37 338	2.33
55–59	15 067	18 335	33 402	2.08
60–64	9 076	11 570	20 646	1.29
65–69	6 482	6 899	13 381	0.83
70–74	3 823	5 014	8 837	0.55
75–79	1 806	2 881	4 687	0.29
80+	1 249	2 604	3 853	0.24
Age group	Male	Female	Total	Percent
0–14	354 245	340 907	695 152	43.32
15–64	423 268	455 383	878 651	54.76
65+	13 360	17 398	30 758	1.92

== Vital statistics ==
Registration of vital events is in Guinea-Bissau not complete. The Population Departement of the United Nations prepared the following estimates.

Period	Live births per year	Deaths per year	Natural change per year	CBR*	CDR*	NC*	TFR*	IMR*
1950–1955	30 000	18 000	12 000	54.9	33.5	21.4	7.41	211
1955–1960	25 000	17 000	7 000	42.3	29.5	12.8	5.88	201
1960–1965	25 000	16 000	9 000	42.3	27.4	14.9	5.88	191
1965–1970	21 000	15 000	6 000	35.6	24.8	10.8	4.78	182
1970–1975	36 000	18 000	18 000	55.7	27.3	28.4	7.34	174
1975–1980	35 000	19 000	15 000	45.5	25.3	20.3	6.11	165
1980–1985	42 000	21 000	21 000	47.9	23.5	24.4	6.70	153
1985–1990	44 000	21 000	23 000	45.8	22.1	23.7	6.68	145
1990–1995	48 000	23 000	26 000	45.2	21.2	24.0	6.54	141
1995–2000	51 000	24 000	27 000	42.8	19.9	22.9	6.05	134
2000–2005	54 000	24 000	29 000	41.1	18.5	22.5	5.66	126
2005–2010	57 000	25 000	32 000	39.3	17.5	21.9	5.27	119
* CBR = crude birth rate (per 1000); CDR = crude death rate (per 1000); NC = natural change (per 1000); IMR = infant mortality rate per 1000 births; TFR = total fertility rate (number of children per woman)

=== Life expectancy ===
Period	Life expectancy in Years
1950–1955	35.88
1955–1960	▲37.19
1960–1965	▲38.63
1965–1970	▲40.60
1970–1975	▲42.48
1975–1980	▲44.49
1980–1985	▲46.60
1985–1990	▲48.18
1990–1995	▲49.99
1995–2000	▲51.81
2000–2005	▲52.68
2005–2010	▲54.18
2010–2015	▲56.00

== Ethnic groups ==
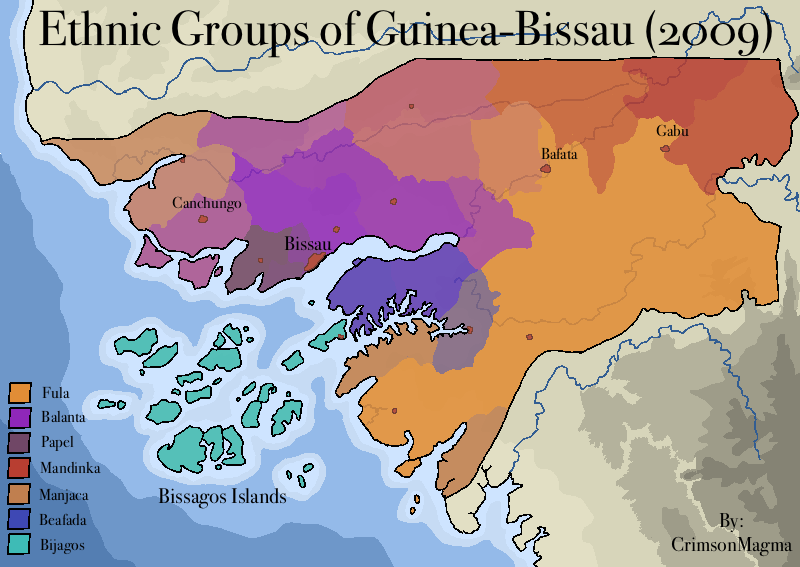
The Major Ethnic Groups of Guinea-Bissau as of 2009. All red spots excluding in the northeast are cities.

- Fulani 28.5%
- Balanta 22.5%
- Mandinga 14.7%
- Papel 9.1%
- Manjaco 8.3%
- Beafada 3.5%
- Mancanha 3.1%
- Bijago 2.1%
- Felupe 1.7%
- Mansoanca 1.4%
- Balanta Mane 1%
- Other 1.8%
- None 2.2%

The population of Guinea-Bissau is ethnically diverse with distinct languages, customs, and social structures. Most Guineans, 99%, are Black people — mostly Fula and Mandinka-speakers concentrated in the north and northeast, the Balanta and Papel, living in the southern coastal regions, and the Manjaco and Mancanha, occupying the central and northern coastal areas.

Most of the rest, 1% of its total population, are mestiços of mixed Portuguese and black descent, including Cape Verdean minority. Due to the exodus of most Portuguese settlers after independence, less than 1% of Guinea-Bissauans are pure Portuguese. The country also has a Chinese minority, including Macanese people of mixed Portuguese and Cantonese blood from Macau.

Most people are farmers. 38%–45% are Muslims – this makes Guinea-Bissau the only Portuguese-speaking nation with a sizable Muslim population. Most Muslims are Sunnis. The rest of the population are pagans, principally the Balanta, and Christians, mostly Roman Catholics.

== Languages ==
- Crioulo 90.4%
- Portuguese 27.1% (official)
- French 5.1%
- English 2.9%
- Other 2.4%

== Religion ==
Muslim 46.1%, folk religions 30.6%, Christian 18.9%, other or unaffiliated 4.4% (2020 est.)
