= List of avant-garde films of the 2010s =

This is a list of avant-garde and experimental films released in the 2010s.

Title	Director	Cast	Country	Notes
2010
The Arbor	Clio Barnard	Manjinder Virk	United Kingdom	
The Autobiography of Nicolae Ceaușescu	Andrei Ujică		Romania	
Bipedality	Rouzbeh Rashidi	Julia Gelezova, Dean Kavanagh	Ireland	
Coming Attractions	Peter Tscherkassky		Austria	
Co-operative Explanatory Capabilities in Organizational Design and Personnel Management	Pil & Galia Kollectiv		United Kingdom	
The Death of an Insect	Hannes Vartiainen, Pekka Veikkolainen		Finland	
Film Socialisme	Jean-Luc Godard	Catherine Tanvier, Christian Sinniger, Jean-Marc Stehle	France; Switzerland	
The Last Soviet	Kerry Tribe		United States	
Marxism Today (Prologue)	Phil Collins	Andrea Ferbar, Marianne Klotz, Petra Mzoga-Zeckay	United Kingdom	
The Miners' Hymns	Bill Morrison		United Kingdom	
Nostalgia for the Light	Patricio Guzmán		Chile	
Reminiscences	Juan Daniel F. Molero		Peru	
Robinson in Ruins	Patrick Keiller	Vanessa Redgrave	United Kingdom	
Uncle Boonmee Who Can Recall His Past Lives	Apichatpong Weerasethakul	Thanapat Saisaymar, Jenjira Pongpas, Sakda Kaewbuadee	Thailand	
Endeavour	Johann Lurf		Austria	
2011
Melancholia	Lars von Trier	Kirsten Dunst, Charlotte Gainsbourg, Alexander Skarsgård, Cameron Spurr, Kiefer Sutherland	Denmark; France	
Museum Songspiel: The Netherlands 20XX	Chto Delat?	Igmar de Haan, Lesley Korpos, William Sutton, Hulp van Dijk, Willemijn van der Ree	Russia; Netherlands	
7aumarivu (7th sense)	AR . Murugadoss	Suriya Sivakumar, Sruthi Hassan, Johnny Tri Nguyen	India	
The Strawberry Tree	Simone Rapisarda Casanova		Canada; Cuba; Italy	
Tall Man	Vernon Ah Kee	Video installation at the Museum of Contemporary Art, Sydney	Australia	
The Tree of Life	Terrence Malick		United States	
This is Not a Film	Jafar Panahi, Mojtaba Mirtahmasb	Jafar Panahi, Mojtaba Mirtahmasb	Iran	
Traduire	Nurith Aviv		France	
The Turin Horse	Béla Tarr, Ágnes Hranitzky	Erika Bók, János Derszi, Mihály Kormos	Hungary	
Two Years at Sea	Ben Rivers		United Kingdom	
Ashes	Apichatpong Weerasethakul		Thailand	
Biancanieves	Pablo Berger		Spain	
The Great Flood	Bill Morrison		United States	
He	Rouzbeh Rashidi	James Devereaux, George Hanover, Maximilian Le Cain, John McCarthy, Cillian Roche	Ireland	
Holy Motors	Leos Carax		France	
Just Ancient Loops	Bill Morrison		United States	
The King's Body	João Pedro Rodrigues		Portugal	
Leviathan	Lucien Castaing-Taylor, Véréna Paravel		United Kingdom; France	
Material Witness OR A Liquid Cop	Ed Atkins		United Kingdom	
Mekong Hotel	Apichatpong Weerasethakul		Thailand	
One, Two, Many	Manon de Boer		Netherlands	
The Search for Emak-Bakia	Oskar Alegría		Spain	
Teenager Hamlet	Margaux Williamson	Sheila Heti, Ryan Kamstra, Sholem Krishtalka, Miloš Rodić, Julia Rosenberg, Margaux Williamson,	Canada	
The Woolworths Choir of 1979	Elizabeth Price		United Kingdom	
A to A (Kreis Wr.Neustadt)	Johann Lurf		Austria	3D
2012
It's Such A Beautiful Day	Don Hertzfeldt	Don Hertzfeldt, Sara Cushman	United States	
RECONNAISSANCE	Johann Lurf		Austria / United States	
2013
Center Jenny	Ryan Trecartin		United States	
Creme 21	Eve Heller		Austria	
Hard to Be a God	Aleksei German		Russia	
Karl Marx Among Us	Jurij Meden		Slovenia	
The Magic Mirror	Sarah Pucill		United Kingdom	
Nayi Kheti	Pallavi Paul		India	
Nymphomaniac	Lars von Trier	Charlotte Gainsbourg, Stellan Skarsgård, Shia LaBeouf, Christian Slater, Uma Thurman, Willem Dafoe, Connie Nielsen.	Denmark; France	
Re: Awakenings	Bill Morrison		United States	
A Spell to Ward Off the Darkness	Ben Rivers, Ben Russell		United Kingdom	
The Stuart Hall Project	John Akomfrah		United Kingdom	
The Great Beauty	Paolo Sorrentino		Italy	
A Thousand Sons	Mati Diop	Magaye Niang	Senegal	
Tomorrow Never Knows	Ed Atkins		United Kingdom	
Warm, Warm, Warm Spring Mouths	Ed Atkins		United Kingdom	
Pyramid Flare	Johann Lurf		Austria	Vertical Cinema
Picture Perfect Pyramid	Johann Lurf		Austria	
2014
Androids Dream	Ion de Sosa		Spain	
Boyhood	Richard Linklater	Patricia Arquette, Ellar Coltrane, Ethan Hawke, Lorelei Linklater	United States	
Canopy	Ken Jacobs		US	
The Creation of Meaning	Simone Rapisarda Casanova		Italy; Canada	
Evergreen	Sasha Litvintseva		Russia; United Kingdom	
Goodbye to Language	Jean-Luc Godard	Kamel Abdelli, Zoé Bruneau, Richard Chevallier, Héloïse Godet	France	
The Guests	Ken Jacobs		US	
Journey to the West	Tsa-i Ming-liang	Denis Lavant, Kang-sheng Lee	Taiwan; France	
Liquidity, Inc.	Hito Steyerl		Germany	
Long Hair, Short Ideas	Pallavi Paul		India	
The Second Game	Corneliu Poromboiu	Adrian Poromboiu, Corneliu Poromboiu	Romania	
Things to Come	Luciano Zubillaga		Argentina	
The Tribe	Myroslav Slaboshpytskiy	Roza Babiy, Grygoriy Fesenko, Yana Novikova	Ukraine	
The Unreliable Narrator	Brad Butler, Noor Afshan Mirza		United Kingdom	
Twelve Tales Told	Johann Lurf		Austria	3D
EMBARGO	Johann Lurf		Austria	3D
2015
2002	C. Spencer Yeh		United States	
88:88	Isiah Medina		Canada	
Bitter Lake	Adam Curtis		United Kingdom	
By Our Selves	Andrew Kötting	Freddie Jones, Toby Jones, Eden Kötting, Alan Moore, Iain Sinclair	United Kingdom	
A Day in the Life of Bliss	Wu Tsang		United States	
The Exquisite Corpus	Peter Tscherkassky		Austria	
Factory of the Sun	Hito Steyerl		Germany	
Finding Fanon (Part I)	Larry Achiampong, David Blandy		United Kingdom	
The Forbidden Room	Guy Maddin	Roy Dupuis, Clara Furey, Udo Kier, Louis Negin	Canada	
Heart of a Dog	Laurie Anderson		United States	
The Lobster	Yorgos Lanthimos	Olivia Colman, Colin Farrell, Léa Seydoux, Rachel Weisz	Greece; United Kingdom	
A Magical Substance Flows Into Me	Jumana Manna		United Kingdom	
Manifesto	Julian Rosefeldt	Cate Blanchett	Australia	
Notes and Sketches I	Gustav Deutsch		Austria	
Notes on Blue	Moyra Davey		Canada	
Patterns of Life	Julien Prévieux		France	
The Pavilion	Jasmina Cibic		Slovenia	
Queer in Space: Kollontai Communist Archive	STAB (Bishkek)		Kyrgyzstan	
Tear Down and Rebuild	Jasmina Cibic		Serbia	
Thanx 4 Nothing	Ugo Rondinone		United States	
Videophilia (and Other Viral Syndromes)	Juan Daniel F. Molero	Liliana Albornoz	Peru	
Capital Cuba	Johann Lurf		Austria	3D
2016
20 July.2015	Deimantas Narkevičius		Lithuania	
And I Danced to Make a Man Again	Adrian Bridget		United Kingdom	
Ascent	Fiona Tan		Netherlands	
Between Fences	Avi Mograbi		Israel	
Chants and Dances for Hand	Larry Gottheim		United States	
Confessions to the Mirror	Sarah Pucill		United Kingdom	
Dawson City: Frozen Time	Bill Morrison		United States	
Endless Poetry	Alejandro Jodorowsky		Chile; France	
An Experiment in Leisure	Manon de Boer		Netherlands	
Expression of the Sightless	Jessica Sarah Rinland		United Kingdom	
Further Beyond	Joe Lawlor, Christine Molloy		Ireland	
Hinterlands	Scott Barley		United Kingdom	
The Human Surge	Eduardo Williams	Manuel Asucan, Chai Fonacier, Shine Marx, Sergio Morisini	Argentina	
I'm Telling You	Ken Jacobs		US	
The Ornithologist	João Pedro Rodrigues		Portugal	
Pinochet Porn	Ellen Cantor		United States	
Sound of the Sun	Pavel Pepperstein		Russia	
2017
★	Johann Lurf		Austria	
Footnote	Ruth Novaczek		United Kingdom	
Last Love	Dmitrii Frolov	Leonid Mozgovoy, Vladimir Zolotar, Natalya Surkova	Russia	
Loving Vincent	Dorota Kobiela; Hugh Welchmann	Robert Gulaczyk, Douglas Booth, Jerome Flynn, Saoirse Ronan, Helen McCrory, Chris O'Dowd, John Sessions, Eleanor Tomlinson, Aidan Turner	United Kingdom; Poland	
Resurrected Genius	Pavel Pepperstein		Russia	
Sleep Has Her House	Scott Barley		United Kingdom	
Song to Song	Terrence Malick	Michael Fassbender, Ryan Gosling, Rooney Mara, Natalie Portman	United States	
Ulysses in the Subway	Ken Jacobs		US	
2018
Alpha (2018 film)	Albert Hughes	Kodi Smit-McPhee,Jens Hultén,Natassia Malthe	United States,Canada,Iceland	
The Grand Bizarre	Jodie Mack		United States	
Hegel's Angel	Simone Rapisarda Casanova	Pierre Widley Phadaël, Mentor Rood, Eddy Fleursaint, Gala Calisto, Philippe Petit, Ebby Angel Louis	Canada; Haiti; Italy; United States	
The Image Book	Jean-Luc Godard		Switzerland; France	
M	Anna Eriksson	Anna Eriksson	Finland	
The Other Side of the Wind	Orson Welles	John Huston, Oja Kodar, Peter Bogdanovich, Susan Strasberg, Norman Foster, Bob Random, Lilli Palmer, Edmond O'Brien, Mercedes McCambridge, Cameron Mitchell, Paul Stewart, Gregory Sierra, Tonio Selwart, Dan Tobin, Joseph McBride, Dennis Hopper	United States; Iran; France	
2019
Above the Rain	Ken Jacobs		US	
Cavalcade	Johann Lurf		Austria	35mm 3D
Gelateria	Christian Serritiello & Arthur Patching		UK	
Moonlight People	Dmitrii Frolov	Natalya Surkova, Yuri Jadrovsky, Vladimir Zolotar, Darya Alymova	Russia	
The Sky Socialist: Environs and Outtakes	Ken Jacobs		US	
