= Reminiscence (disambiguation) =

Reminiscence is the act of recollecting past experiences or events.

Reminiscence(s) may also refer to:

- Reminiscences (2010 film), a Peruvian film
- Reminiscence (2017 film), a Japanese film
- Reminiscence (2021 film), a science fiction drama film
- Reminiscence (Kansuke Yamamoto), a 1953 photograph by Japanese photographer and poet Kansuke Yamamoto
- Reminiscences (album), by Onnine Ibalgwan (1998)
- Reminiscence (Bonnie Pink album), 2005
- Reminiscence (Wink album), 1995
- Reminiscence (EP), by Everglow (2020)

== See also ==
- Reminiscent TV Network (R TV), a short-lived British television network catering to Asian programming
- Reminisce (disambiguation)
- Reminiscing (disambiguation)
