= Reminisce =

Reminisce means to recall a memory, often fondly or nostalgically.

Reminisce and its variants may also refer to:

== People ==
- Reminisce (artist), a San Francisco graffiti artist
- Reminisce (rapper), a Nigerian musician
- Reminisce Smith (better known as Remy Ma), American rapper

== Arts, entertainment, and media ==
=== Games ===
- Reminisce, Volume 2 of the video game .hack//G.U.
- REminiscence, a game engine recreation used in the video game Flashback: The Quest for Identity

=== Music ===
- Reminiscience, a 2009 album by Ugress
- Reminisce Cafe, a 2008 album by Gene Summers
- "Reminisce" (song), a 1992 song by R&B artist Mary J. Blige
- "Reminisce", a song on the 2003 single Reminisce / Where the Story Ends by hip-hop band Blazin' Squad

=== Other arts, entertainment, and media ===
- Reminisce (magazine), a magazine about the 20th Century
- Reminisce (film), an upcoming American drama film
- Reminiscences (film), a 2011 Peruvian documentary film
- Reminiscent TV Network (R TV), a short-lived British television network catering to Asian programming

== See also ==
- Reminiscence (disambiguation)
- Reminiscing (disambiguation)
