= Cibic =

Cibic is a surname. Notable people with the surname include:

- Aldo Cibic (born 1955), Italian designer
- Jasmina Cibic (born 1979), Slovenian artist
