= Resound =

Resound or ReSound may refer to:

- Resound (album), 2002 album by Ugress
- "Resound", 2001 track by Neurosis from A Sun That Never Sets
- CSO Resound, record label by the Chicago Symphony Orchestra

== See also ==
- Re:sound, audio programs affiliated with Third Coast International Audio Festival
- Resonance, acoustic phenomenon
