= MATV =

MATV may refer to:

- Midlands Asian Television, a broadcaster in Leicester, England
- MAtv, a network of community channels in Quebec
- Satellite Master Antenna Television, a system by which (usually) one entire large building is fed from one common set of antennas
- Oshkosh M-ATV, a military vehicle
