= Cinematronics (album) =

Studio album by Ugress
- Released: 2004
- Genre: Electronica
- Length: 48:04
- Label: Tuba Records/Port Azur, Uncanny Planet Records

Ugress chronology
Resound (2002)	Cinematronics (2004)	Unicorn (2008)

Cinematronics is the second album released by the Norwegian electronica project Ugress. It was released on Tuba Records/Port Azur in 2004.

== Critical reception ==
Professional ratings
Review scores
Source	Rating
VG	3/6
Nordlys	3/6
Stavanger aftenblad	4/6
Bergens tidende	3/6 hearts
Bergensavisen	4/6
Gaffa	3/6 stars

Kjetil Wold of Stavanger aftenblad noted that "Ugress make music for the ears and eyes. Ugress makes music you run your own inner short films to — the band's music is downright cinematic. In this sense, "Cinematronics" is a good title. Ugress works best in the lingering and slowly crawling songs - such as "Bad dreams come true" with its mix of both black and white crime noir, Gregorian chant and Arabic music."

Morten Schwarz Lausten of Gaffa stated that "The concept sounds familiar: something resembling samples from movies (whether they're actually from films or not doesn't really matter for the immediate experience of the music...) layered over dragging beats of various kinds, and then supplemented with mood-setting soundscapes and programmed breakbeats."

== Charts ==
Chart (2004)	Peak position
Norwegian Albums (VG-lista)	3

== Track listing ==
1. "Il Pirata"
2. "Manhattan Sapphire"
3. "Makina Fifth"
4. "Cowboy Desperado"
5. "Nightingale"
6. "Bad Dreams Come True"
7. "Binary Code"
8. "The Beauty Never Lasts"
9. "Monochromatic World"
10. "Shadows And Doubts"
11. "Battle 22"
12. "Rainy Transylvanian Day"
