= Ugress =

Norwegian band

- Also known as: Gisle Martens Meyer, Nebular Spool, Shadow of the Beat, Gnosis
- Origin: Bergen, Norway
- Genres: Electronic
- Years active: 2000 to present
- Labels: Uncanny Planet Records, Tuba records/Port Azur
- Members: Gisle Martens Meyer
- Website: https://www.ugress.com/

Ugress is an electronica project from Bergen, Norway, the main project of electronic musician Gisle Martens Meyer (GMM). Meyer started his music career in the early 1990s making Scream Tracker and Fast Tracker modules under the alias Gnosis. Among Meyer's other projects are Nebular Spool, Shadow of the Beat and Ninja9000 as well as scoring soundtracks for moving pictures and several TV-shows.

Ugress has released multiple albums, singles, and EPs to date. Their first five albums: Resound, released in 2002, climbed to the second place on the official Norwegian chart board. A second album, Cinematronics, was released two years later. It reached the third place on the same list. A third Ugress album titled Unicorn was released on January 28, 2008. On June 15, 2009, Ugress released their fourth studio album, called Reminiscience. Collectronics, a compilation album including previously unreleased material, was released in July 2010.

Ugress is notable for providing free mp3-versions of many of its songs through its web page and the web pages of associated acts like Nebular Spool.

The Norwegian word ugress means "weeds" (not as in cannabis).

== Style ==
Ugress uses a lot of sample snippets from various artists, movies (in particular horror and science fiction movies) and TV shows. Ugress is not the only project of Gisle Martens Meyer, it is actually one of several different projects by Uncanny Planet Records.

== Discography ==
=== Albums ===
- Resound (2002)
- La Passion de Jeanne d'Arc (2003)
- Cinematronics (2004)
- Cowboy Desperado (2005)
- Film Music (2006)
- Unicorn (2008)
- Reminiscience (2009)
- Collectronics (2010)
- Pushwagner (2011)
- Aelita – Queen Of Mars (2013)
- Häxan (2016)
- It Came From Beyond Eternal September (2016)
- The Wrong Future (2018)
- Black Anorak (2018)
- Ghoststorm (2019)
- Scavenger Royale (2021)
- Boulevard of Broken Dystopias (2023)
- Retrotopia (2024)

=== Singles and EPs ===
- E-Pipe (2000)
- Ugress Promo (2001)
- Loungemeister (2002)
- Sophisticated Wickedness (2006)
- Retroconnaissance (2006)
- Kosmonaut (2006)
- Chromosome Corrupt (2007)
- Loungemeister (2008)
- Schizophonica (2009)
- Reminiscience (2009)
- Loungemeister (2010) — Re-issue of the 2002 limited edition 12" with a slightly different tracklist.
- Planet U: Episode One - Planetfall (2011)
- Planet U: Episode Two - The Lost Ruins (2011)
- Planet U: Episode Three - Wulfhöken Spaceport Affairs (2011)
- Planet U: Episode Four - Luftslott (2011)
- Planet U: Episode Five - Time Machine (2012)
- Planet U: Episode Six - Another Planet (2013)
- Phantom Of The Wuxia Codec (2019)
- Static Troopers (2019)
- The Teddy Bears' Picnic (2020)
- the door into the room with a.jpg (2020)
- Incandescent Structures of Ambiguity (2020)
- Anemoia 22 (2020)
- Miracle of the Shaolin Moonwolf (2020)
- Your Apathy is Important to Us (2020)
- Curse of the Cancelled (2021)
- Like A Petal But Not Really (2022)
- Pharos Époque (2022)
- Where the Streets Once Had the Moves (2022)
- Nevrotic Umbrella Approaches the Fold (2022)
- This track is no longer available (2022)
- Stasis 44 (2022)
- All of the Colours Except Those Visible (2023)

=== Miscellaneous ===
- The B Vault (2008) — Compilation of unreleased tracks 2000-2007
