= Unicorn (Ugress album) =

Studio album by Ugress
- Released: 2008
- Genre: Electronica
- Length: 37:56
- Label: Tuba Records/Port Azur, Uncanny Planet Records

Ugress chronology
Cinematronics (2004)	Unicorn (2008)	Reminiscience (2009)

Unicorn is the third album released by the Norwegian electronica project Ugress. It was released on Tuba Records/Port Azur in 2008.

Professional ratings
Review scores
Source	Rating
Bergens tidende	4/6 hearts
Bergensavisen	5/6
Østlendingen	4/6

== Charts ==
Chart (2008)	Peak position
Norwegian Albums (VG-lista)	33

== Track listing ==
1. "Redrum"
2. "Lost In Time"
3. "Evil Jeans"
4. "Fail To Grow"
5. "Kommisär Kontemporär"
6. "The Ultimate Fix"
7. "Harakiri Martini "
8. "He Is My Listener"
9. "Zombie Eagles"
10. "Blue Magnetic Monkey"
11. "Regression 22"
