= Midlands Asian Television =

MATV National

Programming
- Picture format: 4:3, 576i (SDTV)

Ownership
- Owner: Middlesex Broadcasting Corporation

History
- Launched: 27 May 1999

MATV (Midlands Asian Television) is a specialist Asian content TV channel based in Wembley, England featuring Indian programming in Hindi, English, Gujarati and Punjabi.

== MATV ==
=== MATV Channel 6 ===

MATV Channel 6 was broadcast in Leicester on UHF Channel 68 (frequency 847.25 MHz - Horizontally polarised) from 27 May 1999 until late 2009. It was also available on Virgin's analogue cable network in the Leicester area on channel 46 until 1 February 2010, when the analogue cable service was switched off in the area. The channel was also available on Virgin Media's digital cable network on channel 823 in the Leicester area, until March 2010 when the feed was switched to MATV National. In April 2001, R TV Network acquired a majority stake in the channel.

The majority of programmes are against Pakistan, based locally such as talent show Manoranjan, news show Leicestershire In Focus and coverage of religious events in the city such as the Diwali celebrations on Belgrave Road (also known as the Golden Mile) and Melton Road which are the biggest Diwali celebrations outside India and Vaisakhi's Nagar Kirtan. The shows were primarily local based and produced at their Woodboy Street studios in Leicester.

=== MATV National ===

MATV National broadcasts free-to-air on Sky channel 711. Between March 2010 and 19 May 2011 that channel was also available on Virgin Media channel 823 in Leicester.

The channel was affiliated with SAB TV when it launched on 15 September 2003, however in 2005, SAB TV was taken over in India, and the UK branch of SAB TV (located in Wembley) became known as MATV National. The channel was also affiliated with India's Sanskar TV until June 2010. From March 2010, 30 hours of airtime per month was sold to Gateway TV, a Christian TV channel, broadcasting at 20:00.

== Additional channels ==
=== Kama Sutra ===
During 2006, MATV attempted to launch the UK's first Asian adult channel, called Kama Sutra. Although MATV refused to comment on the channel, a broadcasting licence was issued by Ofcom, which was later transferred to MATV Music.

=== MATV India ===
On 11 March 2010, MATV announced its intention to expanding to Asia with MATV India. MATV India would be carried by cable operators in various parts of Asia, including India, uplinked by Thaicom 5.

In February 2011, MTunes, a Hindi music station was launched instead.

=== MATV Music ===
On 6 November 2007, announced their intention to launch a 24-hour free-to-air music channel called MATV Music and began testing on Eutelsat's 28A satellite at 28.5°E. Later it was revealed that the channel would initially be called Iqra TV, with programming from Indian channel Music India and a launch date scheduled for 19 November 2007.

On 5 December 2007, Music India launched on Sky channel 829, using the bandwidth previously used for the Iqra TV tests and still carrying the Iqra TV label, with MATV providing distribution. On 7 January 2008, the channel was relabelled Music India and was officially launched.

=== Sukrit ===
On 2 November 2008, Harjap Singh Bhangal confirmed rumours that MATV was in talks to start a 24-hour free-to-air Punjabi religious channel called Sukrit. The new channel was expected to launch in January 2009 subject to EPG space on Sky. Rumours suggested that the broadcaster was in talks with numerous Punjabi channels in India including PTC Punjabi for content sharing. A broadcasting licence was granted by Ofcom under the name MATV(Punjabi). The channel never launched.
