= Clownery =

Clownery (КлоунАда)
- Russian DVD Disc cover
- Directed by: Dmitrii Frolov
- Screenplay by: Dmitrii Frolov
- Based on: Situations by Daniil Kharms
- Starring: Dmitrii Frolov; Dmitri Shibanov; Natalya Surkova; Mark Nahamkin
- Cinematography: Dmitrii Frolov
- Edited by: Dmitrii Frolov
- Music by: Dmitri Shostakovich
- Production company: NEO-film
- Release date: 27 September 1989
- Running time: 53 minutes
- Country: Soviet Union
- Language: Russian

Clownery (Russian: КлоунАда, translit. Klounada) is a black-and-white and colour 1989 Soviet independent film directed by Dmitrii Frolov. It is based on Daniil Kharms novel Situations.

== Plot ==
Various works of Daniil Kharms are connected by means of a character dressed in a sailor's pea coat, which roams from the "case" to the "occasion", getting into various stories and leaving unscathed from the most incredible situations. The character is a nice embodiment of the revolutionary sailor in reserve, what was filled with Russian society in the early 30-ies. He is quite a good-natured "lumpen", not devoid of features of his class: impudence, self-will and unceremoniousness. In the film the works of Harms are screened: "Noise", "Victory of Myshin", "Grigoriev and Semyonov", etc.

== Cast ==
- Dmitrii Frolov as Daniil Kharms
- Dmitri Shibanov as Myshin
- Natalya Surkova as Marya Ivanovna
- Mark Nahamkin as Pushkin
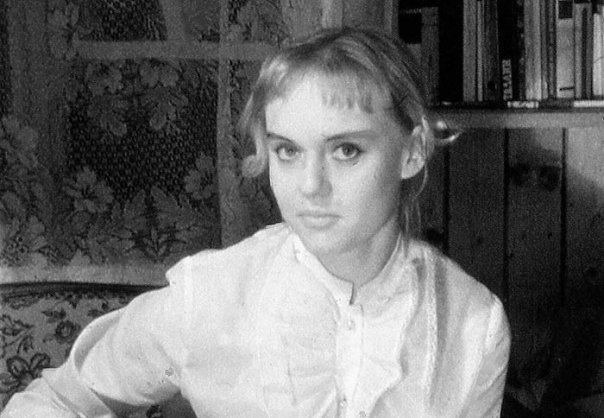
Natalya Surkova in the film "Clownery"

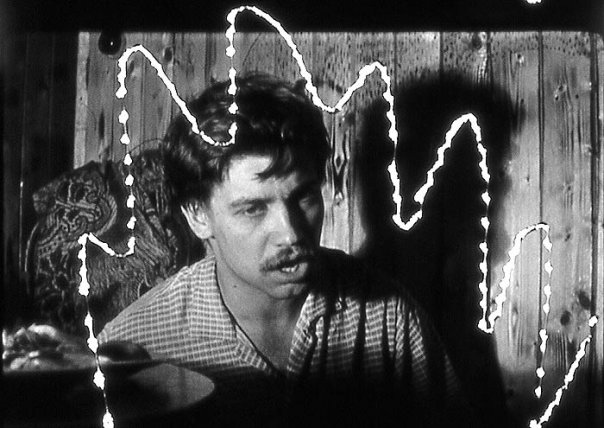
Dmitri Shibanov in the film "Clownery"

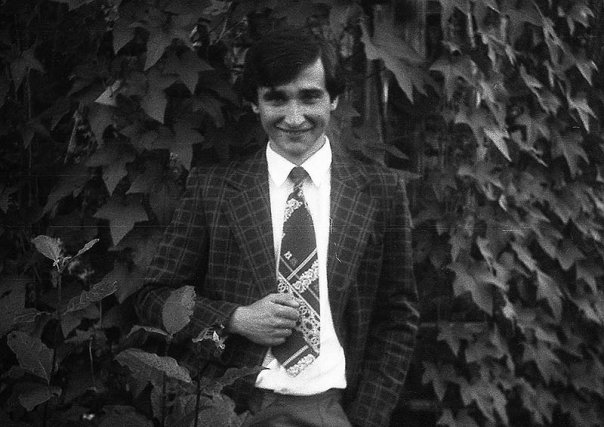
Dmitrii Frolov in the film "Clownery"

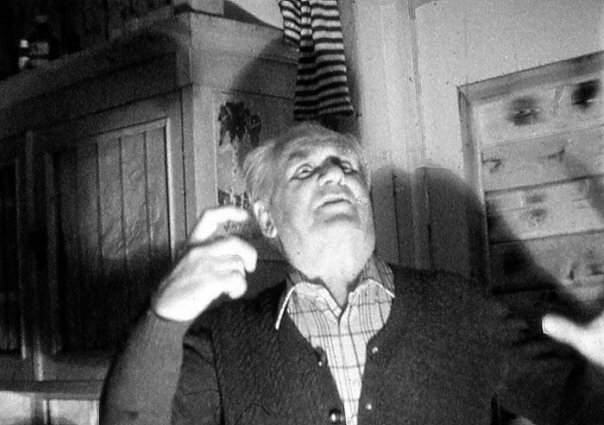
Alexey Zaharov in the film "Clownery"

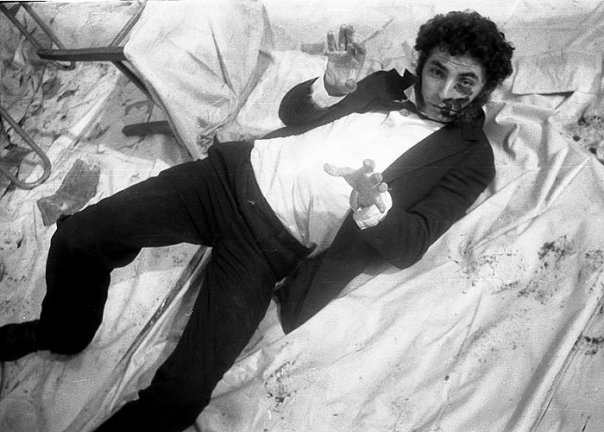
Mark Nahamkin in the film "Clownery"

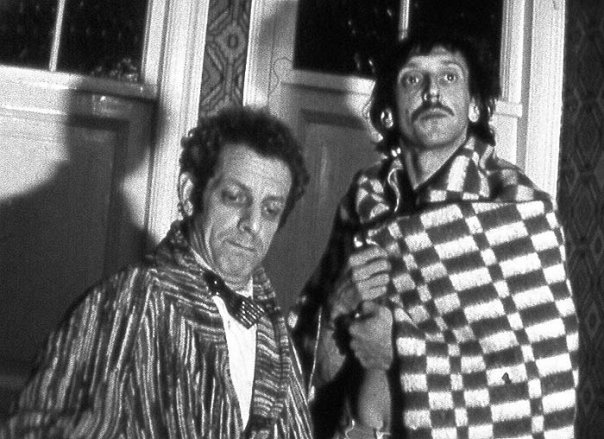
Yakov Shmayev and Yevgeniy Suhonenkov in the film "Clownery"

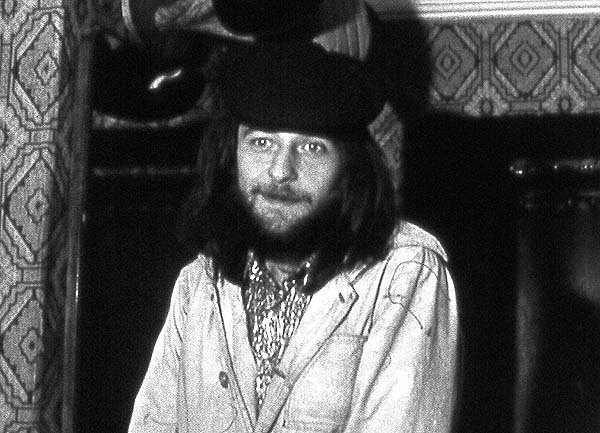
Alexandr Kostin in the film "Clownery"

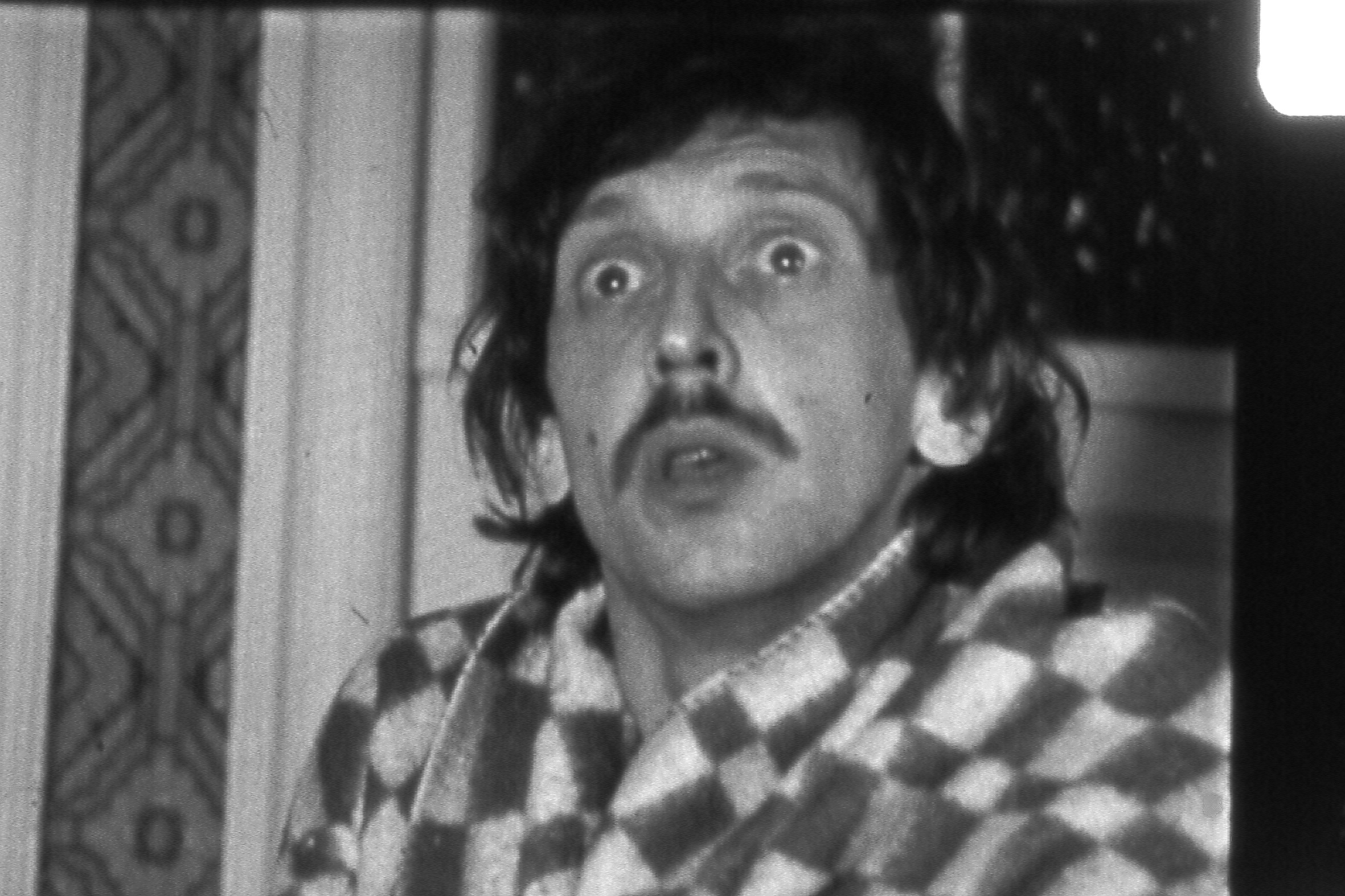
Yevgeniy Suhonenkov in the film "Clownery"

== Details ==
- The intimate scene in "Clownery" was one of the first in the domestic cinema (a little earlier the sensational film "Little Faith" was filmed). In September 1989, when the first screening of "Clownery" for friends took place, this moment produced the effect of a bomb exploding.
- The film was looking for a long way to the viewer, and was officially released in February 2005. Counting from September 1989, the picture material was waiting for this hour for about 16 years. For as many years they waited on the mezzanines of the publication of Kharms's manuscript after his death in 1942, while Yakov Druskin did not start publishing them.
- The premiere of the film was held at the 11th Russian Film Festival "Literature and Cinema" on February 26, 2005, on the eve of the director's birthday.

== Festivals ==
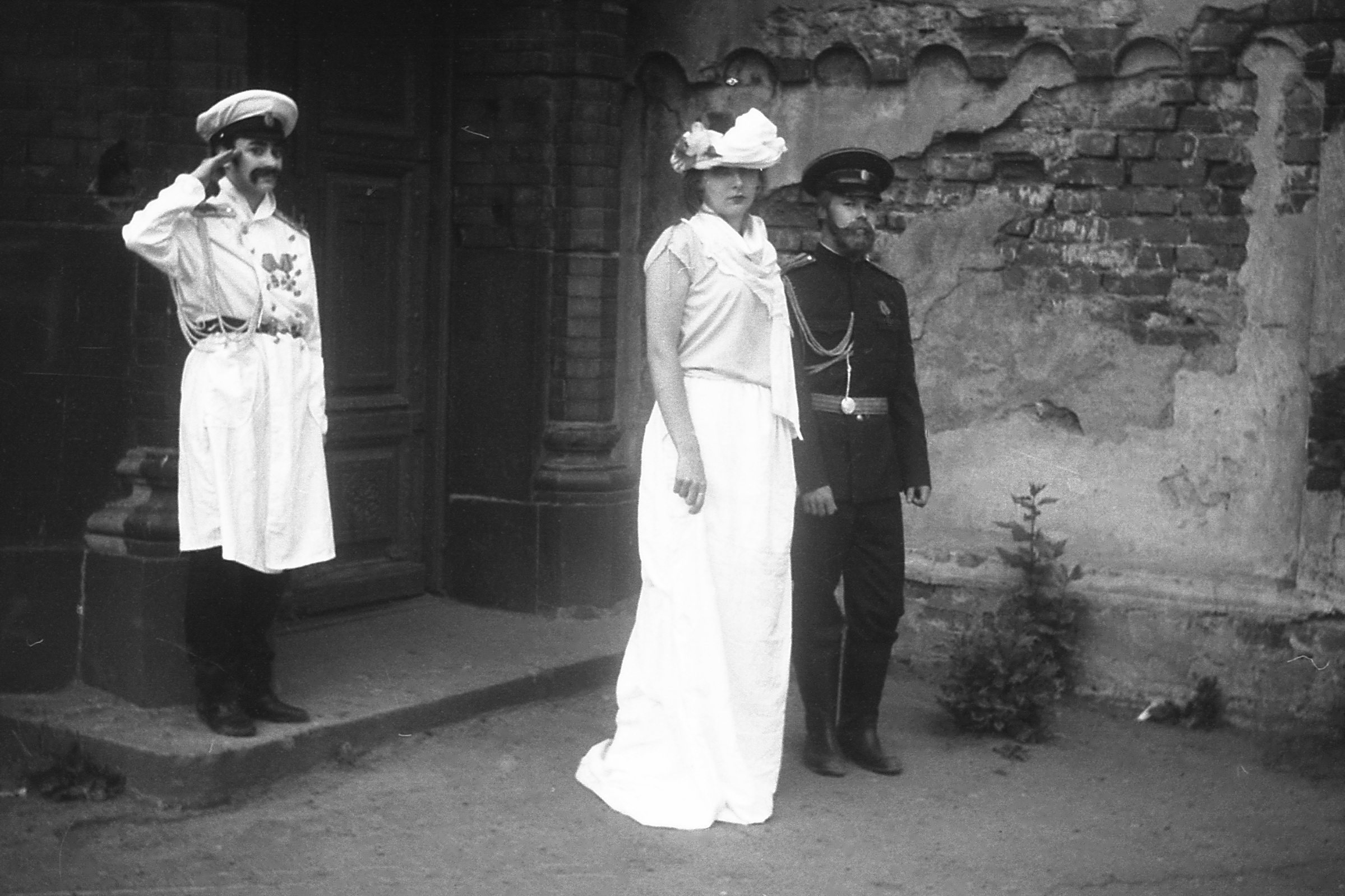
A shot from the movie "Clownery", directed by Dmitry Frolov

- XI Russian Film Festival "Literature and Cinema", Gatchina, February–March 2005;
- IX International Festival of Arts "Sergey Oskolkov and his friends", St. Petersburg, Peterhof, Oranienbaum, June 2005;
- International St. Petersburg "HARMS-Festival-5", St. Petersburg, Russia, June–July 2005;
- Vll International Biennale "DIALOGI", CEH Manege, St. Petersburg, August 2005;
- Club "SINEFANT", Moscow, August 17, 2005;
- 8th International Festival of Independent Cinema "Clear Dreams", St. Petersburg, November 2005;
- X International Art Festival "Sergey Oskolkov and his friends", St. Petersburg, Peterhof, Oranienbaum, June 2006;
- "ARTKONCEPT 2006" - 3rd International Festival of Tendentious Art, St. Petersburg, August 2006;
- INTERZONE, St. Petersburg, July 2008
- The Flight Deck Film Festival, New York City, NY, United States, July 2020
- Global Monthly Online Film Competition, Canada, September, 2020
- Madras Independent Film Festival, Chennai, India, November, 2020
- Best Director Award, London, United Kingdom, November, 2020
- Kosice International Monthly Film Festival, Košice, Slovakia, December, 2020
- Aurora Film Festival, Caserta, Italy, November, 2020
- Cinemaking International Film Festival, Bangladesh, December, 2020
- Standalone Film Festival & Awards, Rancho Cucamonga, United States, February, 2021
- Oasis Inter Continental Film Festival, Mumbai, India, February, 2021
- Gralha International Monthly Film Awards, Curitiba, Brazil, February, 2021
- Accord Cine Fest, Mumbai, India, April, 2021
- Gutterbliss Temporary Testival, United States, May, 2021
- Continental Film Awards, India, May, 2021
- SonderBlu Film Festival, New York, United States, September, 2021
- The World's Best Self Funded Films - CPFF Qualifying Film Festival, October, 2021
- CINEMA OF NATIONS, Potsdam, Germany, December, 2021
- Paradise Film Festival, Budapest, Hungary, December, 2021
- Hamburg Film Awards, Hamburg, Germany, January, 2022
- Shiny Sparkle Independent Online Film Festival, January, 2022
- Art Gallery Film Festival, Chennai, India, February, 2022
- Hallucinea Film Festival, Paris, France, February, 2022

== Awards ==
- Special prize "Through the thorns to the stars" for a new language in the cinema at International Festival of Independent Cinema "Clean Dreams - VIII", November 2005
- FINALIST on The Flight Deck Film Festival, New York City, NY, United States, July 2020
- Best Experimental Feature, Best Director Feature, Best Actor Feature, Best Actress Feature, Global Monthly Online Film Competition, Canada, September, 2020
- Best Experimental Feature, Best Editing at Madras Independent Film Festival, Chennai, India, November, 2020
- Best Director Experimental Film at Best Director Award, London, United Kingdom, November, 2020
- Honorable mention at Cinemaking International Film Festival, Bangladesh, December, 2020
- Best Cinematography of Feature Film 🏆 Best Sound Design/Mix of Feature Film 🏆 Best Production Design of Feature Film 🏆 Best Costume Design of Feature Film 🏆 Best Feature Film Poster at Gralha International Monthly Film Awards, Curitiba, Brazil, February, 2021
- Best Experimental Feature at Accord Cine Fest, Mumbai, India. April, 2021
- Best European Experimental Feature at Continental Film Awards, India, May, 2021
- Nominee at The World's Best Self Funded Films - CPFF Qualifying Film Festival, October, 2021
- Finalist at Shiny Sparkle Independent Online Film Festival, January, 2022
- Best Experimental Film at Art Gallery Film Festival, Chennai, India, February, 2022
- Special Mention at Hallucinea Film Festival, Paris, France, February, 2022
