= Fever (2022 film) =

- Theatrical release poster
- Spanish: Fiebre
- Directed by: Elisa Eliash
- Written by: Elisa Eliash
- Based on: Un poco de fiebre by Elisa Eliash
- Produced by: Clara Taricco; Rafael Sampaio; Marco Panatonic; Juan Daniel F. Molero
- Starring: Lautaro Cantillana Teke
- Cinematography: Michelle Bossy
- Edited by: Juan Eduardo Murillo
- Music by: Andrés Markmann; Mateus Alves
- Animation by: Roberto Gonzales; Juan Pablo Sandoval; Diego Vizcarra Soberón; Tenis Estudio; Tapel Papiz
- Production companies: La Forma Cine; Válvula Films; Klaxon; Films Bastardía; Tiempo Libre
- Release dates: October 11, 2022 (Valdivia); November 2022 (PÖFF); July 6, 2023 (Chile)
- Running time: 84 minutes
- Countries: Chile; Peru; Brazil
- Language: Spanish

Fever (Spanish: Fiebre) is a 2022 live-action/animated family fantasy film written and directed by Elisa Eliash. Starring Lautaro Cantillana Teke. It is based on the 2017 short film Un poco de fiebre by the same director. The film had an initial release as part of the 29th Valdivia International Film Festival, Chile on October 11, 2022.

== Synopsis ==
Nino is a spoiled child who, plunged into a strong fever, is absorbed by a mysterious painting. His mother had warned him and the ruse that made him fall prey to the painting has been unleashed. Thus, Nino does nothing but lose himself in a maze of images that will take him further and further away from the safety of his home, going from painting to classic cinema, from drawing to photography, and from the Polynesian paradise to the myth of the volcano. But will Nino be able to return to his mother?

== Cast ==
The actors participating in this film are:

- Lautaro Cantillana Teke as Nino
- Nora Catalano as Dina
- Macarena Teke
- Néstor Cantillana
- José Soza
- Tita Iacobelli
- Agatha Simunovic
- Luciano Jadrievich
- Gabriel Urzua
- Paula Zuñiga
- Paula Bravo
- Camilo Egaña

== Release ==
Fever had an initial premiere as part of the 29th Valdivia International Film Festival, Chile on October 11, 2022. It had its European premiere at the 26th Tallinn Black Nights Film Festival, Estonia in late November 2022. It was commercially released on July 6, 2023 in Chilean theaters.

== Reception ==
Diego Batlle of Otros Cines.com wrote: "Fever -an extension of a short of her from a couple of years ago- is a film made with intelligence and respect without falling into condescension, demagogy or manipulation. And also because it shows that you can take advantage of the limited resources available with creativity, without putting yourself down or "apologizing."... The beautiful songs and the inspired animation amplify the achievements of a film that will be far from perfect, but that stands on its own, demonstrating that there is space to make films for boys and girls with rigor, elegance and nobility."
