= When Evening Falls on Bucharest or Metabolism =

2013 film

- Film poster
- Directed by: Corneliu Porumboiu
- Written by: Corneliu Porumboiu
- Starring: Diana Avramut
- Cinematography: Tudor Mircea
- Release dates: 9 August 2013 (Locarno IFF); 20 September 2013 (Romania)
- Running time: 89 minutes
- Country: Romania
- Language: Romanian

When Evening Falls on Bucharest or Metabolism (Romanian: Când se lasă seara peste București sau Metabolism) is a 2013 Romanian drama film written and directed by Corneliu Porumboiu. It was screened in the Contemporary World Cinema section at the 2013 Toronto International Film Festival.

== Cast ==
- Diana Avramut
- Bogdan Dumitrache
- Mihaela Sirbu
- Alexandru Papadopol
