= Reminiscing (disambiguation) =

"Reminiscing" is a 1978 song by Australian rock music group Little River Band.

Reminiscing may also refer to:

- Reminiscing (Buddy Holly album), 1963, and the title song
- Reminiscing (Chet Atkins and Hank Snow album), 1964
- Reminiscing (Slim Whitman album), 1967
- Reminiscing, a 1965 album by Johnny Smith
- "Reminiscin", a 2001 song by Ella Mae Saison, featuring CeCe Peniston

== See also ==
- Just Reminiscin', 2000 compilation album of songs recorded by American singer Jo Stafford
- Reminisce (disambiguation)
