= Above the Lake =

Above the Lake (Надъ озеромъ)
- Russian DVD Disc cover
- Directed by: Dmitrii Frolov
- Screenplay by: Dmitrii Frolov
- Based on: poetry by Alexander Blok
- Starring: Peter Kremis; Romil Rachev; Natalya Surkova
- Cinematography: Dmitrii Frolov
- Edited by: Dmitrii Frolov
- Music by: Sergey Oskolkov
- Production company: NEO-film
- Release date: 9 May 1995
- Running time: 10 minutes
- Country: Russia
- Language: No dialogue

Above the Lake (Russian: Надъ озеромъ, translit. Nad ozerom) is a black-and-white 1995 independent film directed by Dmitrii Frolov. It is based on Alexander Blok novel Nad ozerom. The film is not an adaptation in the usual way: it is the reconstruction of the cinema of the beginning of the 20th century, performed by Frolov's contemporaries. Being a poetically philosophical reflection of the perception of Alexander Blok's poetry, the film at the same time reproduces the atmosphere of the legendary Silver Age.

== Plot ==
The work presents a variation on the classical love triangle: a poor poet, possibly associated with Alexander Blok himself, a mysterious “ghost-lady,” and a third character whose refinement is suggested through his beauty and his article on Dante. Rather than depicting a purely aesthetic or symbolic world, the text places its characters within ordinary human passions and conflicts. Their relationships are marked by emotional exhaustion, desire, and rivalry, while the poet’s imagination transforms the situation into a broader reflection on two men’s love for the same woman.

== Cast ==
- Peter Kremis as Poor poet
- Romil Rachev as The poet's friend
- Natalya Surkova as Lady

== Details ==
- Work on the film began in 1994, according to a script that does not at all resemble the final film.
- Filming took place in Shuvalovo-Ozerki, the area where Alexander Blok wrote the poems “Above the Lake” and “The Stranger.” In the early 20th century, the station and its surroundings were a popular summer destination for artistic youth and members of the nobility. Some scenes were filmed at locations closely corresponding to those described in Blok’s poem “Above the Lake.”
- Music for the film "Above the Lake" was composed and recorded in 2006 by the modern classical composer Sergei Alexandrovich Oskolkov.
- The original version of the 1995 film was 15 minutes, but then the whole scene was cut from it by the director, which reduced the film by a third.
- The film was shot on a camera with a manual drive, reminiscent of the technique of shooting films in the era of silent movies.
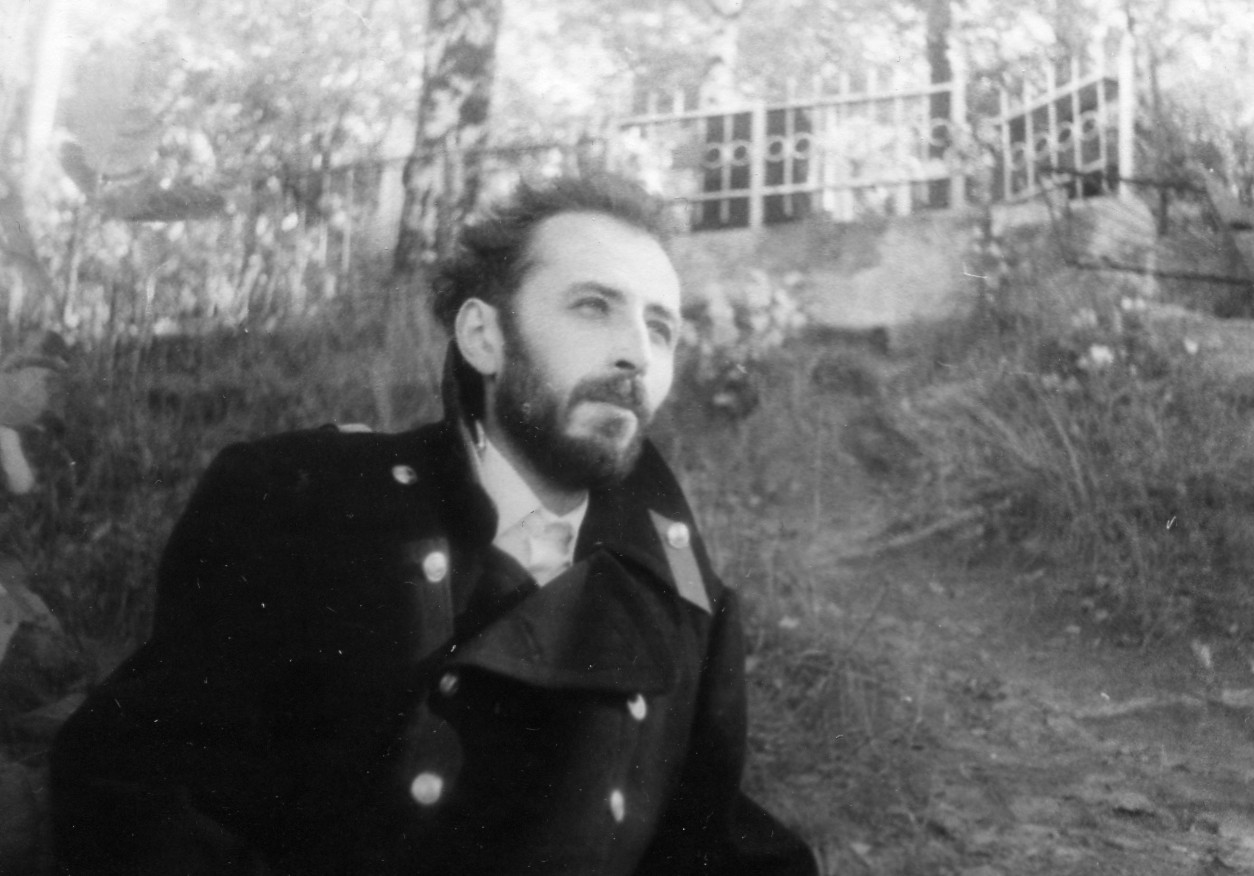
Shot from the film "Above the Lake"

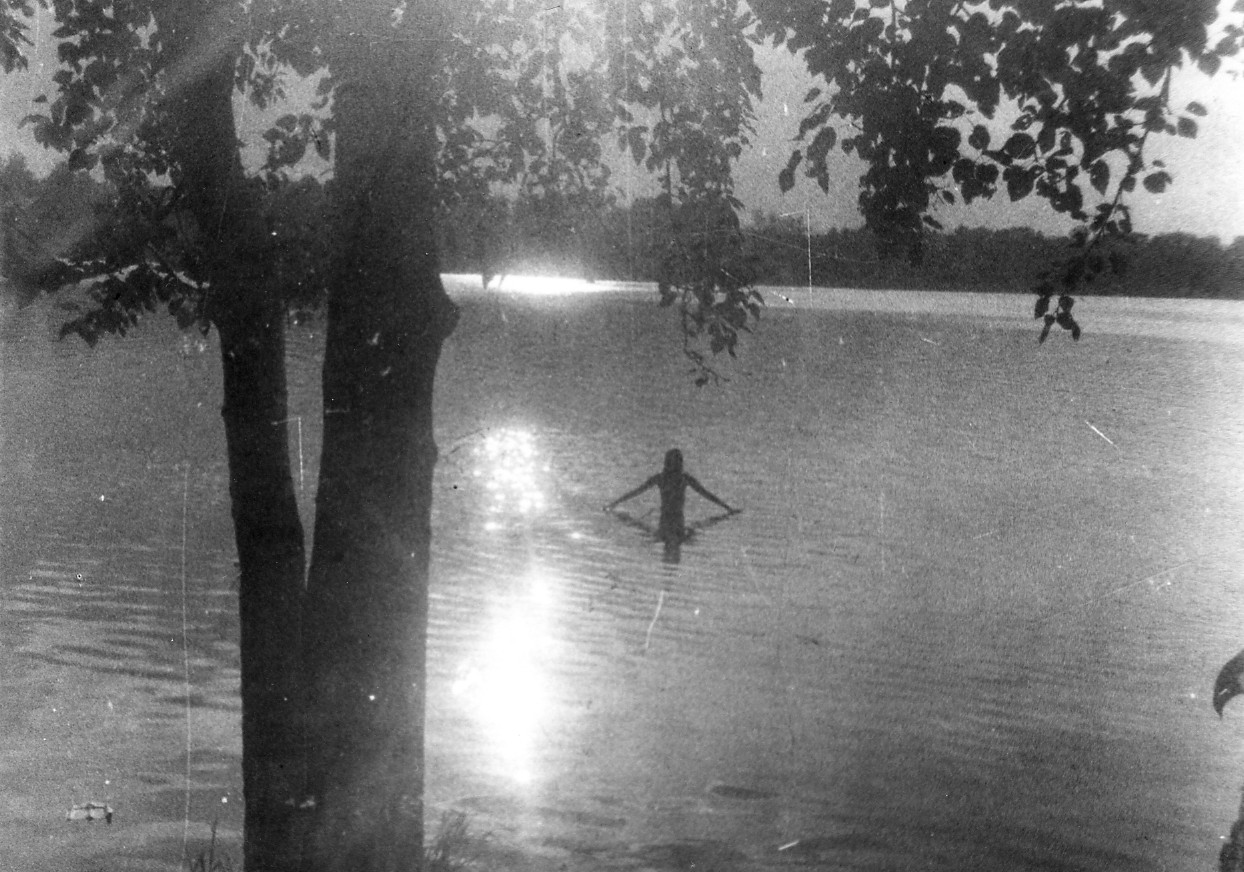
Shot from the film "Above the Lake"

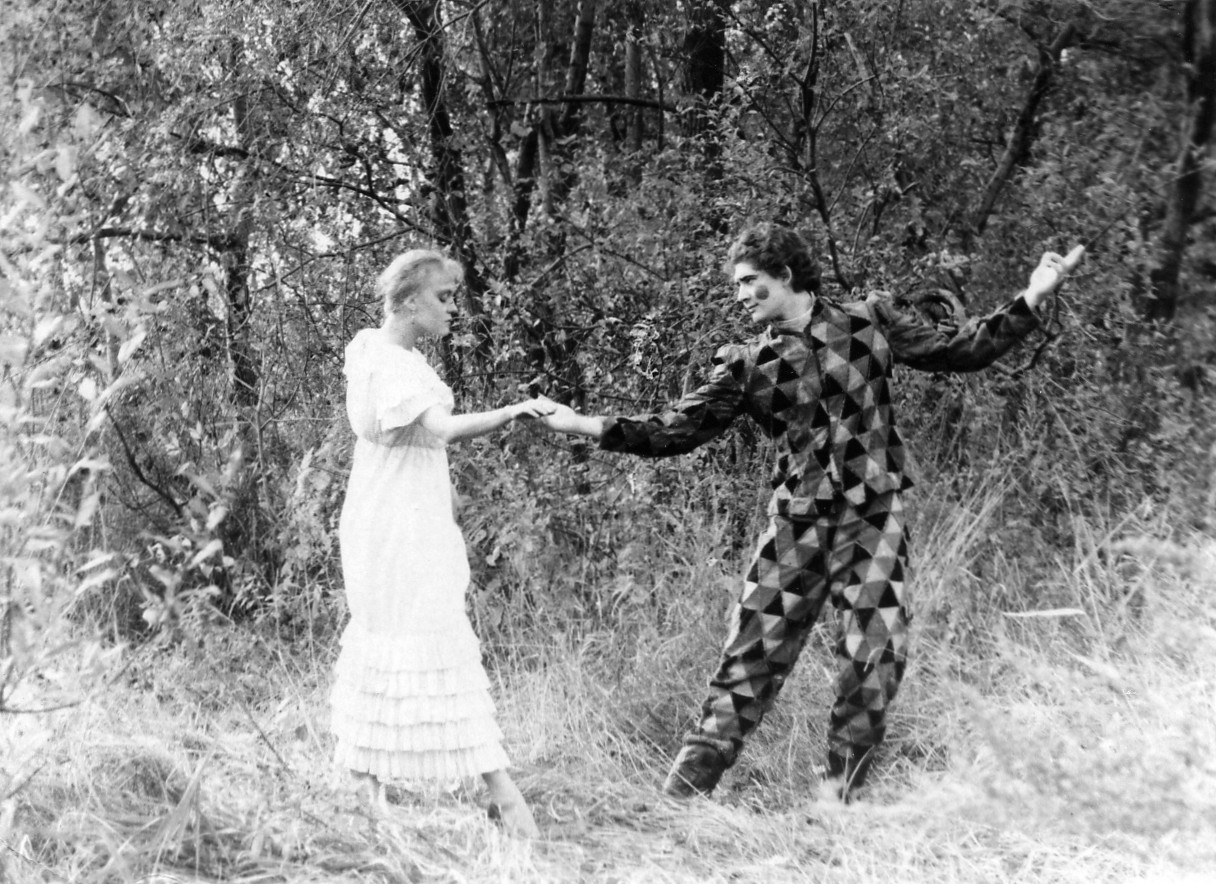
Shot from the film "Above the Lake"

== Festivals ==
- Light & Future International Film Festival, Houston, USA, March 2019 (Award)
- Once a Week Online Film Festival, USA, September, 2019
- Direct Monthly Online Film Festival, USA, October, 2019
- Festival Internacional de Cine Silente, Puebla, Mexico, November, 2019 (WINNER)
- Madras Independent Film Festival, Madras, India, July, 2020 (Award Winner)
- Global Monthly Online Film Competition, Canada, July, 2020 (Award Winner)
