= Collectronics =

Compilation album by Ugress
- Released: 2010
- Genre: Post-dubstep, trip hop
- Length: 52:13
- Label: Uncanny Planet Records

Ugress chronology
Reminiscience (2009)	Collectronics (2010)

Collectronics is a compilation album of singles and EPs released by the Norwegian electronica project Ugress. It was released by Uncanny Planet Records in 2010.

== Track listing ==
1. "Klavier Aparat"
2. "Nightswimming"
3. "Terapolis Nightclub Fantasy"
4. "Ghost Von Frost"
5. "Business Below"
6. "Einhorn 22"
7. "Sepia Rainbows"
8. "Diurnal Entropy"
9. "Skagerrak"
10. "Armada Of Evil Intentions"
11. "Kosmonaut"
12. "Explorer's Demise"
13. "NBPD Theme"
14. "Trenchant Preliator"
15. "Music For A Recursive Function"
16. "Isolation"
