= Dmitrii Frolov =

Soviet film director

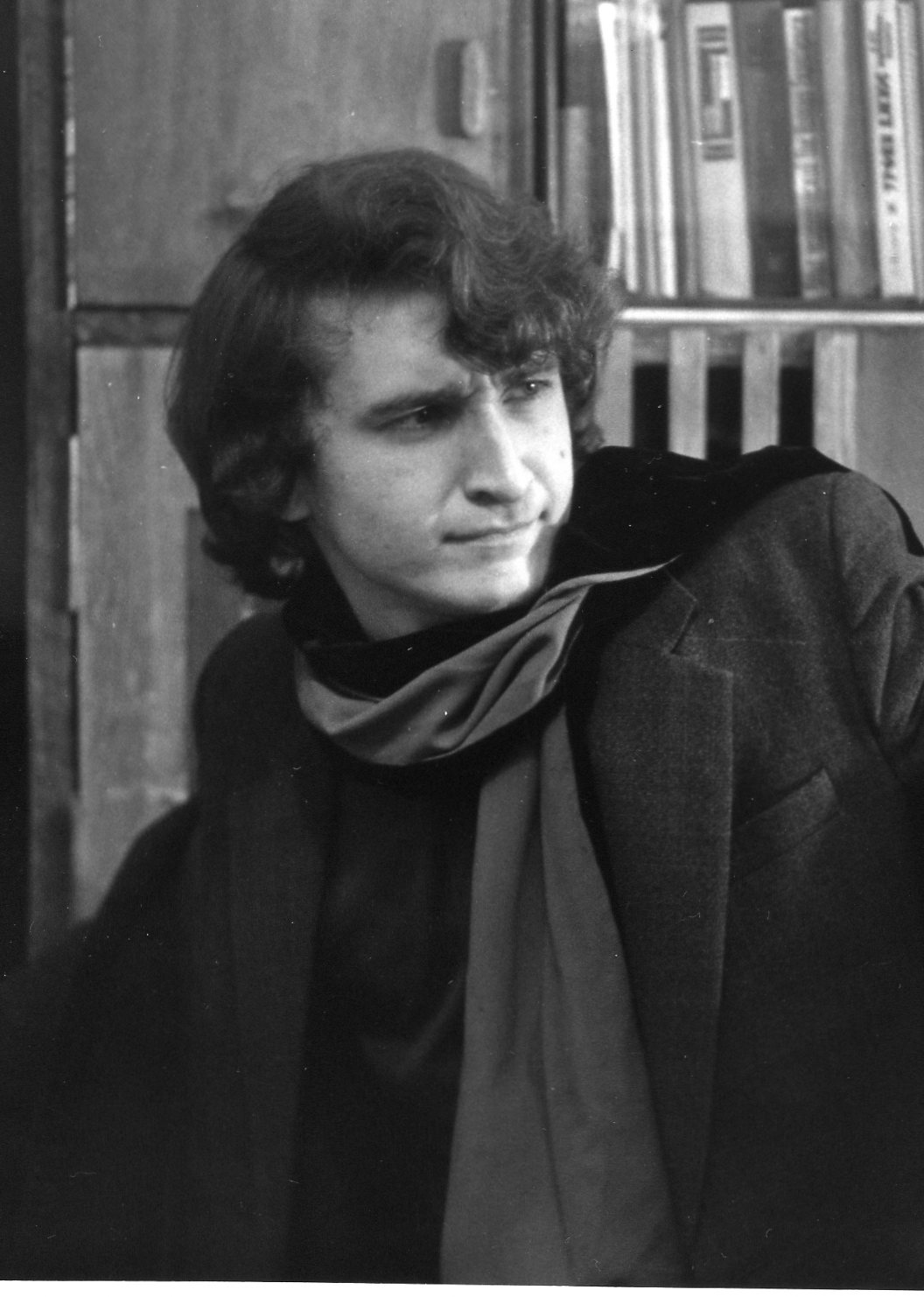
- Frolov in 1990
- Born: February 27, 1966 (age 59); Leningrad, Soviet Union
- Occupations: Film director, director of photography, actor
- Years active: 1981–present
- Awards: TEFI
- Website: dmitrfrolov.narod.ru

Dmitrii Alexeyevich Frolov (Russian: Дмитрий Алексеевич Фролов; born February 27, 1966) is a Russian film director in independent experimental cinema and a director of photography.

== Biography ==
Russian experimental filmmaker Dmitri Frolov is known for his abstract, atmospheric films that explore themes of memory, time, and existential reflection through minimalist visual storytelling. Frolov was born in Leningrad on February 27, 1966. In 1990, he graduated from the University of Cinema and Television. A screenwriter, director and cameraman, Frolov took part in more than 30 short films. He was included in several domestic film festivals – including Kinoshok in Anapa, Pure Dreams in St. Petersburg, and Cine Phantom Fest in Moscow – and foreign ones. He also shot music videos for the group Auktsion, and worked as the senior operator of the TV channel 100TV.

He makes aesthetic experiments connecting with return to silent cinema on new level of film language.

He is a laureate of the National Award "TEFI-2008" in the nomination "Operator of a TV film / series".

In 2022 he won the special festival mention award at the first season of Casablanca Film Factory Awards.

== Filmography ==
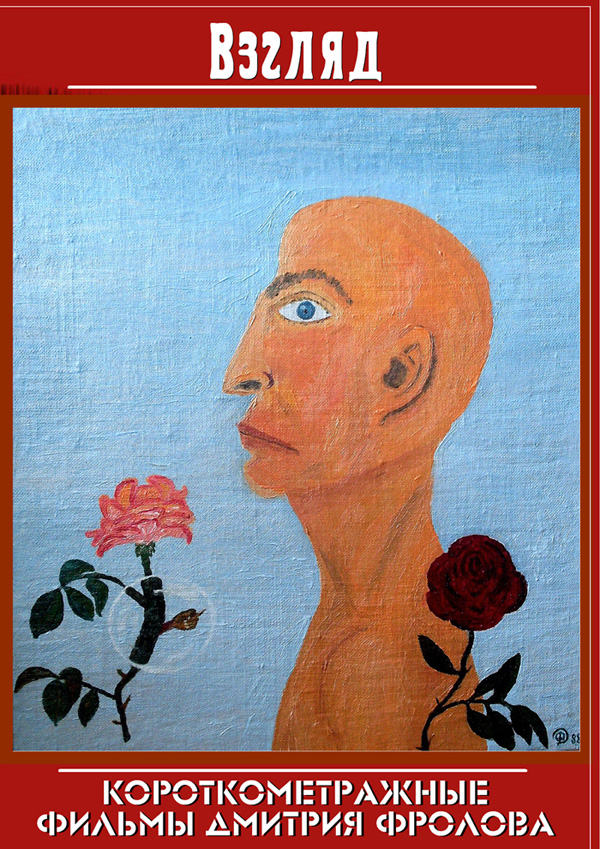
DVD cover of a collection of movies by Dmitry Frolov

=== Director ===
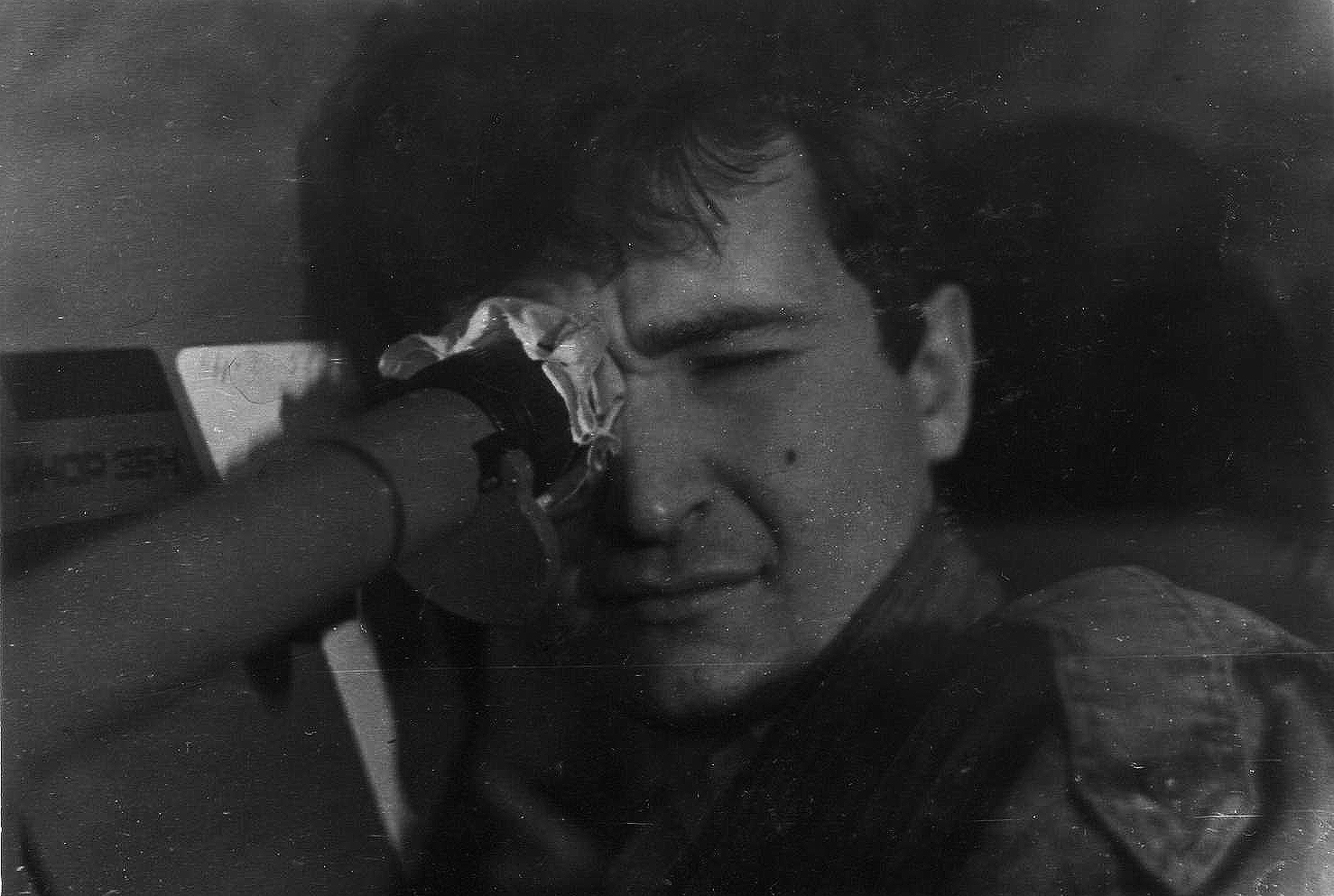
Dmitri Frolov in the film

Films

- 1987 – Dream
- 1988 – The Way
- 1988 – Metamorphosis
- 1988 – Theater. Afterword
- 1989 – Act
- 1989 – Clownery
- 1990 – Without words
- 1990 – The Second Birth
- 1991 – KARA
- 1991 – Psycho Attack Over Soviets
- 1991 – The Leaving
- 1991 – Beekeeper
- 1990–1993 – The Big Moon Nights
- 1994 – Do not august, 1991
- 1994 – Stairway to the sky
- 1995 – Above the Lake (silent version)
- 1995 – Underwater Guest
- 1996 – Das Es
- 1997 – Be Careful!
- 1997 – Ten minutes of silence
- 1998 – The Little Sotmaid
- 1999 – Rumba
- 2000 – Decease
- 2001 – The Granny's Apocrypha
- 2002 – Tango Nightingale
- 2002 – The Two
- 1991–2003 – Phantoms of white nights
- 2004 – The daddy's meat
- 2006 – Above the Lake (version with sound)
- 2010 – Wellspring
- 2010 – The Birth of Music
- 2010 – Conversation
- 2016 – The Lone
- 2017 – Last Love
- 2018 – Winter Will Not Be
- 2019 – Moonlight People
- 2020 – Borodino
- 2021 – Astronaut's Uniform
- 2022 – Dreams of the Past
- 2024 – Adagio
- 2025 – Dinner

Video clips

- 1991 – Let her know (group "Esty")
- 1992 – The crazy city (the group "Inflatable gun")
- 2000 – Something like this (Leonid Fedorov ("Auktsion")
- 2000 – There will be no winters (Leonid Fedorov ("Auktsion")
- 2000 – Head-leg (Leonid Fedorov ("Auktsion")
- 2000 – Lady Dee (Leonid Fedorov ("Auktsion")
- 2000 – Far away (Leonid Fedorov ("Auktsion")
- 2002 – Yagoda (Leonid Fedorov ("Auktsion")
- 2002 – Catholics (Leonid Fedorov ("Auktsion")
- 2003 – Let (Leonid Fedorov ("Auktsion")
- 2017 – Time, back! (Sergey Oskolkov)

=== Cinematographer ===
- 1993 – The Battle of Leningrad (directed by N. Klyuchnikov)
- 1994 – The life and adventures of 4 friends (directed by O. Yeryshev)
- 1994–1995 – A series of documentary reports about Timur Novikov and the New Academy of Fine Arts (directed by L. Chibor)
- 1995 – The acceptance of fate (directed by L. Chibor)
- 1996 – Presence (directed by A.Kuklin)
- 1996 – After 300 years (director G.Novikov)
- 1998 – Courant (directed by A.Kuklin)
- 1999 – Artist Gleb Bogomolov (director L. Chibor)
- 2000 – How "Brother-2" was shot (director V.Nepevny, T. Ober)
- 2000 – Nobody writes to the Colonel (video clip of the BI-2 group)
- 2000 – The Wizard of our city (directed by R. Rachev)
- 2000 – Ugar (directed by G.Novikov)
- 2001 – Dark Night (directed by O. Kovalov (samples)
- 2001 – Daughter of Albion (directed by K.Kasatov)
- 2001 – Fairy Tales (directed by B.Gorlov, K.Kasatov)
- 2002 – Song (directed by L. Yunina)
- 2002 – Mozart. Fantasy in the cafe (director G.Novikov)
- 2003 – "Adjacent Rooms" (directed by K.Seliverstov)
- 2003 – Kira (directed by V.Nepevny)
- 2004 – Living in History (directed by G.Novikov)
- 2004 – Children of corn (director M.Zheleznikov)
- 2004 – Merry plumber (director V.Nepevny)
- 2005 – Light in August (director G.Novikov)
- 2005 – "School of Baba Yaga" (directed by A.Chikichev)
- 2007 – "The color of time" (directed by K.Kasatov)
- 2008 – "Children of the Siege" (directed by A.Chikichev)
- 2008 – "Autograph of Time" (directed by A.Chikichev)
- 2008 – "Hello, the land of heroes!" (Directed by A.Chikichev)
- 2009 – "My contemporaries" (directed by A.Chikichev)
- 2009 – "For Home Viewing" (directed by M.Zheleznikov)
- 2010 – "Vasily Turkin. The book about the fighter "(directed by S. Lyalkin)
- 2010 – "The Seasons" (directed by S. Lyalkin)
- 2013 – "A Successful Visit" (directed by L. Galkin)
- 2017 – "Unknown Leningrad Region" (directed by S. Lyalkin)
- 2017 – "Last Love"
- 2019 – "Moonlight People"
- 2022 – "Dreams of the Past"
- TV: 1996–1999 – series of programs "Line of Cinema" (ORT-1 channel) (prize of the festival "White pillars" in 1999)

=== Actor ===
Year	Title	Role
1987	Dream	A character, a mime
1988	The Way	1st Comrade
1988	Metamorphosis	Figure
1989	Clownery	Daniil Harms
1993	The Bigmoon Nights	A Man with an Accordion
1993	Shatanger Aylok	Unutor Flor
2002	Tango Nightingale	The Male
2020	Borodino	Bagration and Kutuzov's adjutant
2022	Dreams of the Past	Officer
