= Just Reminiscin' =

Compilation album by Jo Stafford
- Released: January 1, 2000
- Recorded: 2000
- Genre: Traditional pop
- Label: Dutton Laboratories/Vocalion
- Producer: Jo Stafford

Professional ratings
Review scores
Source	Rating
Allmusic	4.5/5 stars

Just Reminiscin' is a 2000 compilation album of songs recorded by American singer Jo Stafford. The album was released on January 1, 2000, in the United Kingdom on the Dutton Laboratories/Vocalion label.

== Track listing ==
1. "I've Never Forgotten"
2. "By the Way"
3. "In the Still of the Night"
4. "This Is the Moment"
5. "Baby, Won't You Please Come Home"
6. "Better Luck Next Time"
7. "The Stanley Steamer"
8. "Roses of Picardy"
9. "Trouble in Mind"
10. "When April Comes Again"
11. "Feudin' and Fightin'"
12. "Love and the Weather"
13. "If I Ever Love Again"
14. "Red River Valley"
15. "Ragtime Cowboy Joe"
16. "The Last Mile Home"
17. "Day by Day"
18. "When You Got a Man on Your Mind"
19. "The Gentleman Is a Dope"
20. "Serenade of the Bells"
21. "Suspicion"
22. "Clabberin' Up for Rain"
23. "Always True to You in My Fashion"
24. "Why Can't You Behave?"
25. "Once and for Always"
26. "Just Reminiscin'"
