= Johann Lurf =

Johann Lurf (born 1982 in Vienna) is an Austrian artist and filmmaker known for his experimental films.

== Education ==
He studied abstract painting and film at the Academy of Fine Arts Vienna in the classes of Walter Obholzer and Harun Farocki from 2002 until 2009. In 2008 he participated in an Erasmus Programme at the Slade School of Fine Art in London.

== Work ==
His work focuses on human perception. His more formally-oriented filmic experiments are always accompanied by strong narratives that, however subtly, examine society, codes, norms, perception, and the history and development of cinema.

With short and feature-length, analog and digital film, found-footage and his own shots, Lurf has made a wide variety of cinematic works, many of which have been featured in international film festivals and cultural institutions.

One focus of his work is the temporal depiction of selected places. For some projects, he has constructed specialised devices to capture images. Multiple films were shot in stereoscopic 3D, on 16mm, 35mm as well as on 70mm film.

Another strand of his work is the analysis of cinematic language with the means of found-footage film. In 2017, Johann Lurf published his feature-length film with the title ★, a film compilation which consists of clear starry night skies from film history exclusively. The excerpts have not been modified in their images, sounds or duration - only arranged in chronological order. The film has been expanded with additional material in later versions.

In 2022, he was involved in the publication of the book Stargazing in Cinema, which accompanies the film ★.

His work has been shown in exhibitions at the Kunsthaus Graz, Kunsthaus Zürich, the Los Angeles County Museum of Art, the MAK Center for Arts and Architecture in Los Angeles as well as the Vienna Secession.

His films premiered in programmes including Berlinale Forum Expanded, the Locarno Film Festival, the Sundance Film Festival, and the Viennale. Showcases of his films were presented at the Anthology Film Archives in New York, the Austrian Film Museum, Los Angeles Film Forum, the mumok Kino in Vienna and the Viennale, among others.

His film work is being distributed by sixpackfilm in Vienna, Light Cone in Paris and the Chicago Film Society.

== Work list (selection) ==
- Forever...Forever (2026) 21 minutes 70mm & 35mm
- Revolving Rounds (2024) with Christina Jauernik, 11 minutes 35mm / 3D
- Stargazing in Cinema (2022) 208 pages
- Cavalcade (2019) 5 minutes 35mm / 3D
- Earth Series (2017) with Laura Wagner, collages
- ★ (2017) 130 minutes (version 2025)
- Capital Cuba (2015) 12 minutes 35mm / 3D
- EMBARGO (2014) 10 minutes 3D
- Twelve Tales Told (2014) 4 minutes 35mm / 3D
- Pyramid Flare (2013) 5 minutes 35mm Vertical Cinema
- Picture Perfect Pyramid (2013) 5 minutes 16 mm
- RECONNAISSANCE (2012) 5 minutes
- A to A (2011) 5 minutes 35 mm / 3D
- Endeavour (2010) 16 minutes
- The Quick Brown Fox Jumps Over the Lazy Dog (2009) 3 minutes 35mm
- 12 Explosions (2008) 6 minutes
- VERTIGO RUSH (2007) 19 minutes 35 mm
- pan (2005) 2 minutes
- (ohne Titel) (2003) 3 minutes

== Awards (selection) ==
- Honorable Mention (Short Film) Pardo Verde, Locarno Film Festival (2024)
- Lewis Baltz Research Fund, Le Bal Paris (2019)
- Diagonale – Prize for Innovative Cinema (2018)
- State Grand für Video- and Media Art (2011)
- Diagonale – Prize for Innovative Cinema (2008)
