= J. D. Fernández Molero =

Peruvian filmmaker

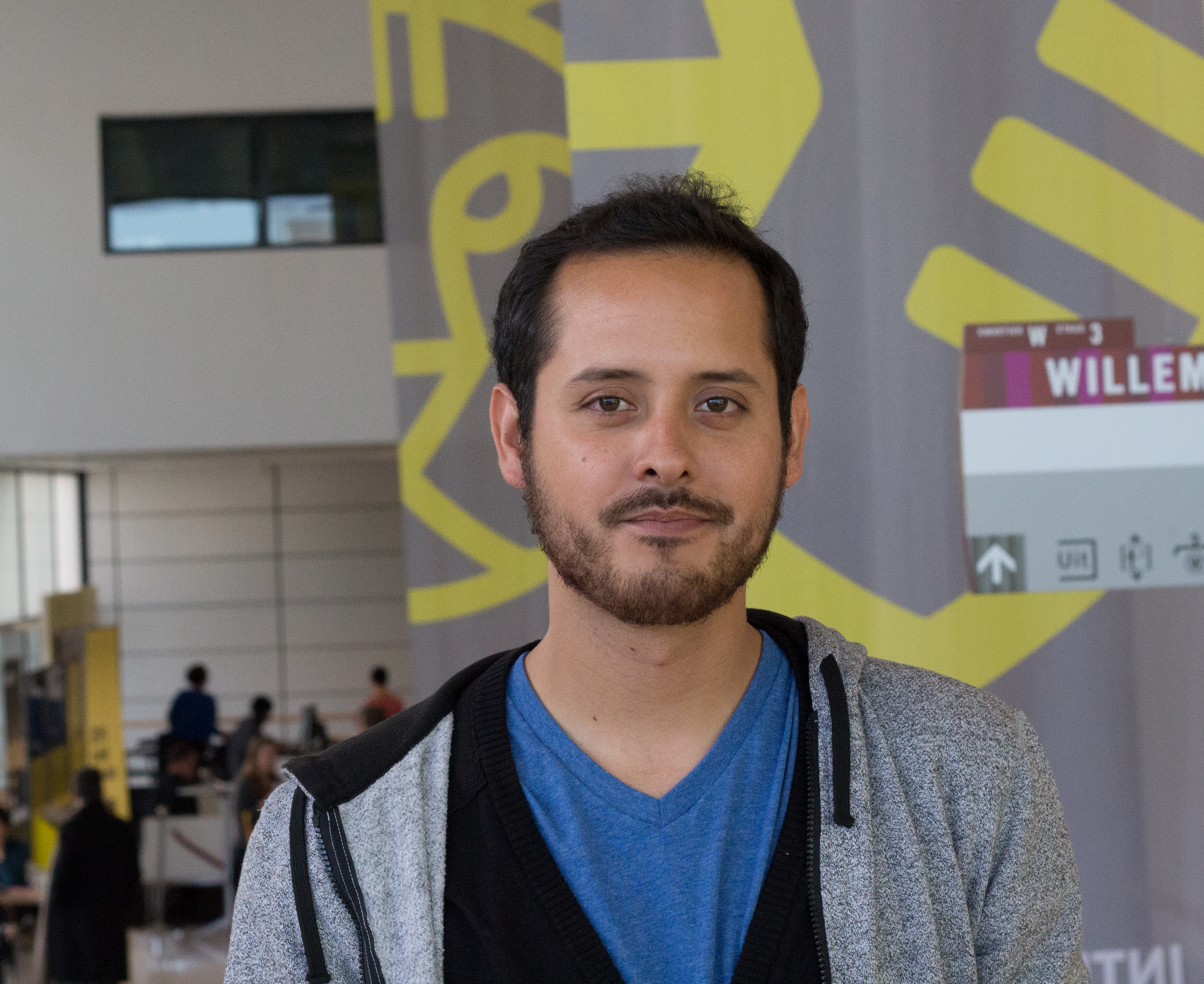
- Fernández in 2015
- Born: Juan Daniel Fernández Molero; July 22, 1987 (age 39); Lima, Peru
- Other names: Juan Daniel F. Molero (2008–2024); J. D. Fernández Molero (2025–present)
- Occupations: Film director Screenwriter; Film producer Film editor
- Years active: 2008–present
- Notable work: Reminiscences; Videophilia (and Other Viral Syndromes); Punku

Juan Daniel Fernández Molero (born July 22, 1987) is a Peruvian filmmaker. He is known for his avant-garde films Reminiscences (2010), Videophilia (and Other Viral Syndromes) (2015), which won the Tiger Award at the International Film Festival Rotterdam, and Punku (2025), which premiered in the Forum section at the 75th Berlin International Film Festival.

== Career ==
Fernández was born in Lima in 1987, he studied for two years at the University of Cinema in Buenos Aires (FUC), was a student in the Trainee Project for Young Film Critics of the Rotterdam Film Festival, and in the Talent Campus of Buenos Aires (2010) and the Berlinale (2011).

In 2008, he founded Tiempo Libre, a film production company through which he also distributes films in cultural circuits and organizes film workshops.

In 2009, F. Molero collected old recordings and home video archives to create Reminiscences, a documentary feature exploring the creation and loss of memory based on his own episode of amnesia following a sandboarding accident. A short version premiered in July of that year at the Centro Cultural Cafae. The following year, an extended version premiered in March at the 25th Guadalajara International Film Festival.

In 2015, he premiered his first feature film, Videophilia (and Other Viral Syndromes), which won the Tiger Award at the International Film Festival Rotterdam, becoming the first Peruvian film to win the festival's top prize. Subsequently, it was selected as the Peruvian entry for the Best Foreign Language Film at the 89th Academy Awards.

In 2025, he released his second feature film, Punku, in the Forum section at the 75th Berlin International Film Festival, nominated for the FIPRESI Prize in that section, also was nominated for the Trophy Spondylus at the 29th Lima Film Festival, winning Best Cinematography - Special Mention for Johan Carrasco.

== Select filmography ==
Year	Title	Director	Writer	Producer	Editor	Notes
2010	Reminiscences	Yes	Yes	Yes	Yes	Documentary feature film
2012	Another Day Without a Future, But What the Hell Another Day...	No	No	No	Yes	Short film
2015	Videophilia (and Other Viral Syndromes)	Yes	Yes	Yes	Yes	Feature film
2016	Alba	No	No	No	Yes	Feature film
2016	Asuncion	No	No	No	Yes	Short film
2019	The Lost Pussy of the Incas	No	No	No	Yes	Documentary feature film
2022	Fever	No	No	Yes	No	Feature film
2024	Huaquero	No	No	Yes	Yes	Feature film; associate producer
2025	Punku	Yes	Yes	Yes	Yes	Feature film
