= Corneliu Porumboiu =

Romanian film director, screenwriter and producer

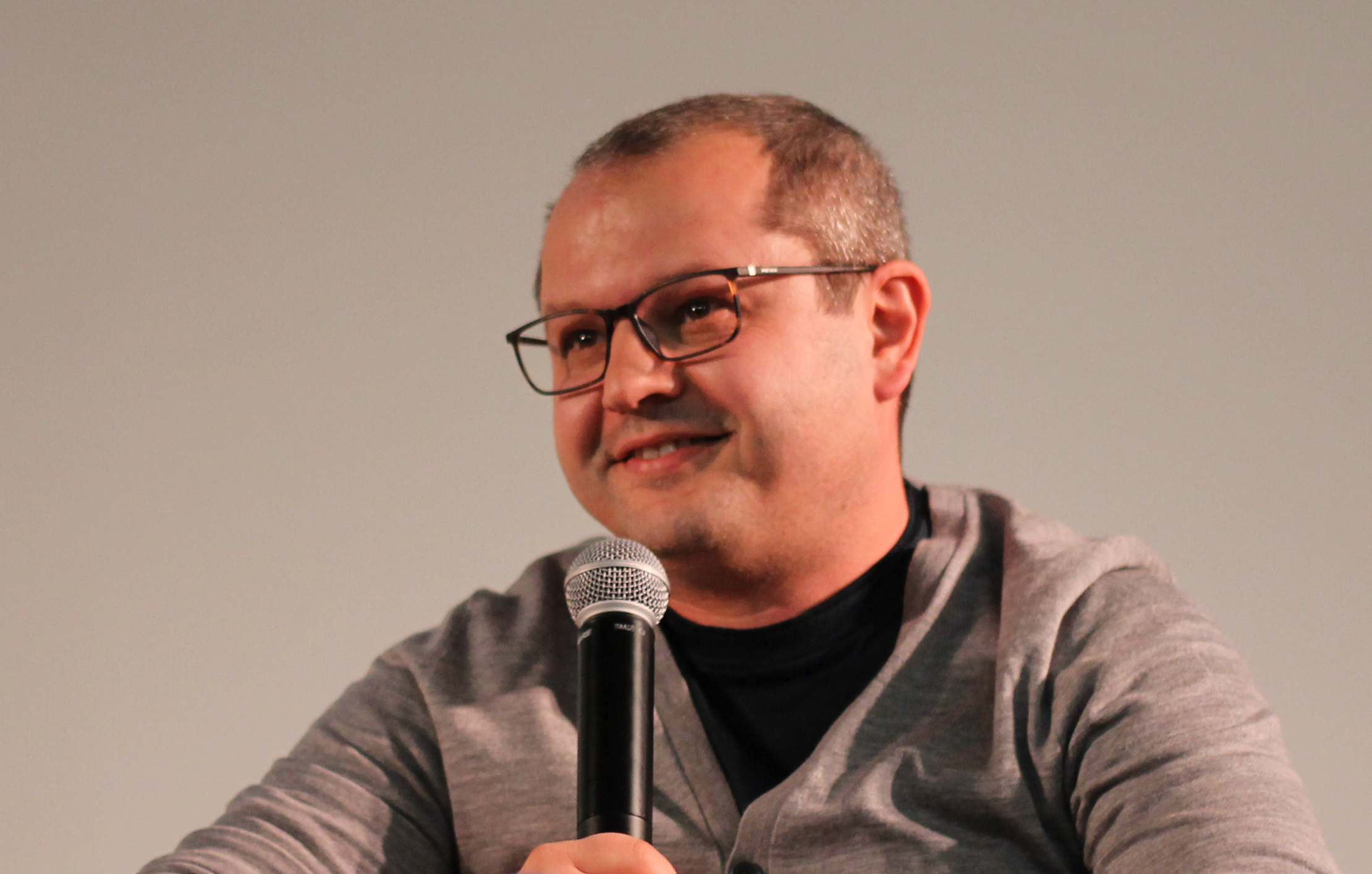
- Porumboiu at Lisbon Film Festival in 2019
- Born: 14 September 1975 (age 50); Vaslui, Vaslui County, Romania
- Education: National University of Theatrical Arts and cinematography Bucharest
- Occupations: Film director; screenwriter; film producer
- Spouse: Arantxa Etcheverria
- Children: 2

Corneliu Porumboiu (Romanian: [korˈnelju porumˈboju]; born 14 September 1975) is a Romanian New Wave filmmaker, screenwriter, and film producer. He is most known for his films 12:08 East of Bucharest (2006) and The Whistlers (2019).

== Life and education ==
Corneliu Porumboiu was born in Vaslui, Vaslui County, Romania. He is the son of a former Romanian language teacher and a former football referee Adrian Porumboiu, currently a businessman.

Between 1994 and 1998 he attended the faculty of Management at ASE University Bucharest.

In 1999, he started studying film directing at the National University of Theatrical Arts and Cinematography Bucharest, where he graduated in 2003. With his graduation short movie, A trip to the city, he gets prize II in the Cinefondation section at Cannes International Film Festival.

In October 2021 he was under investigation for fiscal fraud and money laundering by the Directorate for Investigating Organized Crime and Terrorism (DIICOT).

== Career ==
After graduating UNATC, in 2004, he realized his first medium-length film The Dream of Liviu. Also in 2004 he sets up, together with Marcela Ursu, the production house 42km FILM.

In 2005, Corneliu wrote and directed his first feature film 12:08 East of Bucharest, which was selected for the Directors Fortnight section of the 2006 Cannes Film Festival, where it won the Camera d'Or. The film received over 20 prizes in festivals around the world and was distributed in more than 30 territories.

In 2009, Police, adjective, the second film written and directed by Corneliu Porumboiu, was launched, The film won the Jury Award at the Cannes International Film Festival in the Un Certain Regard section.

In 2013, the third feature When evening falls on Bucharest or Metabolism, signed by Corneliu Porumboiu, had its premiere at the Locarno Film Festival.

In 2014, he directed a sports documentary, The second game, which was presented in the Berlin Forum.

In 2015, his next fiction film, The Treasure, was awarded with A Certain Talent in the Un Certain Regard section of the Cannes International Film Festival.

In 2018, he realized a second documentary, Infinite Football, which premiered in the Berlin Forum section.

In 2019, he finished his fifth fiction film, La Gomera/The Whistlers which had the world premiere in the Official Competition of the 72 edition of the Cannes International Film Festival.

== Personal life ==
Porumboiu is married to Arantxa Etcheverria, a visual artist of French origin. They have two children together. In the production of his newest feature films, The Treasure and The Whistlers, Arantxa participated as artistic director.

=== Political beliefs ===
In December 2023, alongside 50 other filmmakers, Porumboiu signed an open letter published in Libération demanding a ceasefire and an end to the killing of civilians amid the 2023 Israeli invasion of the Gaza Strip, and for a humanitarian corridor into Gaza to be established for humanitarian aid, and the release of hostages.

== Filmography ==
=== As filmmaker ===
Year	English Title	Original Title	Notes
2006	12:08 East of Bucharest	A fost sau n-a fost?	Also producer
2009	Police, Adjective	Polițist, Adjectiv	Also producer
2013	When Evening Falls on Bucharest or Metabolism	Când se lasă seara peste București sau Metabolism	
2014	The Second Game	Al doilea joc	Documentary
2015	The Treasure	Comoara	
2018	Infinite Football	Fotbal Infinit	Documentary
2019	The Whistlers	La Gomera	
2026	The Costume		Post-production

=== Short films ===
- Gone with the Wine / Pe aripile vinului (2002)
- A Trip to the City / Călătorie la oraş (2003) (won Second Prize of the Cinéfondation in 2004)
- Liviu's Dream / Visul lui Liviu (2004)
- Infinite Football (Fotbal Infinit) (2018)
- The Whistlers (or La Gomera) (2019)

=== Only screenwriter ===
- The Unsaved (2013)

== Prizes ==
- 2004: SECOND Prize in the Cinefondation section at the Cannes Film Festival with his short-movie A trip to the City
- 2006: Caméra d'Or Prize and The "Transilvania" Trophy at TIFF 2006 for the movie 12:08 East of Bucharest.
- 2007: Gopo Award for Best directing at the Gopo Gala for the film 12:08 East of Bucharest.
- 2009: At the Cannes Film Festival, the movie, Police, adjective (2009) by Corneliu Porumboiu, was awarded with the FIPRESCI Prize and the Jury Award at the Un Certain Regard section.
- 2014: Winner in the Best Romanian film section in TIFF and nominations for Best Directing, Best Feature, Best Documentary in the Gopo Awards with The second game film.
- 2015: Winner in the Best Romanian film section in TIFF, A Certain Talent at the Un Certain Regard section in Cannes, FIPRESCI Award for Best Film and Best Screenplay award at Cairo International Film Festival with The Treasure movie.
- 2018: Winner of the award for Best Documentary at the Jerusalem Film Festival, with the movie Infinite Football.
- 2019: Winner of the award for Best Screenplay at the Seville Festival with the film La Gomera/The Whistlers.
