= Manon de Boer =

Dutch video artist (born 1966)

Manon de Boer (1966, Kodaikanal, India) is an Indian-born Dutch video-artist.

== Biography ==
She studied at the Willem de Kooning Academy in Rotterdam and at the Rijksacademie in Amsterdam. Since 2006 de Boer is part of the Brussels production and distribution platform Auguste Orts. She was also the co-founder of this platform. She lives and works in Brussels.

The experience of time pervades the work of Manon de Boer. This is an extended experience of time, firmly anchored in the conditions of creation that incessantly produces a present and presence and resists a normative, functional and productive concept of time. Manon de Boer mainly works within the audiovisual realm. In connection with her films, she works increasingly with sculpture, installation and in 2021 she made a performance, Ghost Party (1) together with Latifa Laâbissi.

Her work has been exhibited internationally, at the Venice Biennale (2007), Berlin Biennale (2008), São Paulo Biennial (2010), Kassel Documenta (2012), Taipei Biennial (2016). Her work has been the subject of monographic exhibitions at Witte de With in Rotterdam (2008), Frankfurter Kunstverein (2008), South London Gallery (2010), Contemporary Art Museum of St Louis (2011), Museum of Art Philadelphia (2012), Van Abbe Museum in Eindhoven (2013), Secession Vienna (2016), Gulbenkian Museum Lisbon (2020), Museum Dhondt-Dhaenens Ghent (2022), Kunstmuseum St. Gallen (2022) and Kanal-Centre Pompidou (2026) among others; and has also been included in numerous film festivals in Hong Kong, Marseille, Rotterdam and Vienna.

== Filmography ==
- Ghost Party (2) (2022)
- Persona (2022)
- Oumi. From nothing to something to something else, part 3 (2019)
- Caco, João, Mava and Rebecca. From nothing to something to something else, part 2 (2019)
- Bella, Maia and Nick. From nothing to something to something else, part 1 (2018)
- An Experiment in Leisure (2016 - 2019)
- Je kunt nooit volledig zijn (2016)
- The Untroubled Mind (2016)
- On a Warm Day in July (2016, installation)
- Maud Capturing the Light 'On a Clear Day'(2015, installation)
- Laurien, March 1996 - Laurien, September 2001 - Laurien, October 2007 - Laurien, July 2015 (2015)
- Sequenza (2014, co-dir)
- one, two, many (2012)
- Think About Wood, Think About Metal (2011)
- Dissonant (2010)
- Two Times 4'33 (2008)
- Villes saisies/Captured Cities (2007)
- Presto, Perfect Sound (2006)
- Resonating Surfaces (2005)
- SylviaKristel - Paris (2003)
- Hollywood Hills (2001)
- Sylvia, March 1, 2001)
- Laurien, September 2001 (2001)
- Robert, October 2001 (2001)
- Recalling Names and Places (1999)
- Shift of Attention (1999)
- The Monologues (1997)
- Laurien, March 1996 (1996)
- Robert, June 1996 (1996)

== Exhibitions ==
- https://augusteorts.be/about/manon-de-boer
- https://kanal.brussels/en/calendar/manon-de-boer
