= The Leaving =

Novel by Jumi Bello

- Book cover
- Author: Jumi Bello
- Language: English
- Genre: Literary fiction

The Leaving is a literary fiction novel by Jumi Bello. In 2022, the novel was canceled by its publisher Riverhead Books prior to release after Bello revealed that much of the book was plagiarized.

== Plot ==
Sumatra, a young black woman with a dissociative disorder living in Beijing, learns that she is pregnant and returns to the United States. She recounts her troubled and traumatic life story in a series of flashbacks, therapy sessions, and recordings for her unborn daughter.

== Background ==
Bello is the daughter of a Haitian American mother and a Nigerian father. After graduating from Grinnell College in 2013, she lived and traveled in Asia, including China, Taiwan, and the Philippines. Bello graduated from the Master of Fine Arts program in creative writing at the Iowa Writers' Workshop in 2021. In April 2021, she sold The Leaving, her debut novel, to publisher Riverhead Books in a six-figure deal.

== Publication history ==
=== Plagiarism issues and cancelation ===
According to Bello, in December 2021 she told her editor that the manuscript of The Leaving contained passages taken from authors James Baldwin and Carole Maso. In response, Riverhead Books conducted a review of the manuscript, identifying roughly 30 separate instances of plagiarism. The full list of authors whom Bello had plagiarized included Baldwin, Maso, Marie Cardinal, Matthew Olzmann, Jennifer Nansubuga Makumbi, Rebecca Solnit, and Bassey Ikpi. Riverhead estimated that 30 percent of The Leaving's contents were plagiarized.

The novel's publication, which had been scheduled for July 2022, was canceled by Riverhead in February. In May, Bello published an essay on the website Literary Hub admitting to the plagiarism amid her struggles with mental illness and the pressure she felt to publish. Bello said that she had searched for other writers' depictions of pregnancy online, since she had never been pregnant herself, and had initially justified it to herself as "just borrowing and changing the language." She also said that Riverhead had reduced her time to edit the manuscript from eight months to two months.

Literary Hub withdrew Bello's essay hours after its publication. Readers discovered that the essay, too, had been plagiarized, with material taken from an article from the website Plagiarism Today. In a statement, Literary Hub said that the essay had been removed "because of inconsistencies in the story and, crucially, a further incident of plagiarism in the published piece". Jonathan Bailey, author of the plagiarized article, called Bello's writing process "a deeply problematic approach" that "makes plagiarism not only likely, but inevitable... The way you avoid plagiarism isn’t to 'change the language' but to never have that language in your original work in the first place."

Many social media users noted the irony in Bello having plagiarized in an essay meant to atone for her plagiarism. Writers such as Akwaeke Emezi and Terese Marie Mailhot defended Bello, arguing that she was receiving heightened criticism because of her race. Bello disagreed with these claims, but suggested that her identity as a black woman contributed to the media's interest in the story. Roxane Gay also expressed her support for Bello on Twitter, hoping that there would be "a space for redemption at some point".

=== Aftermath ===
A July 2022 Air Mail article extensively profiled Bello and the controversy surrounding The Leaving. In the article, Bello disclosed that she had schizoaffective disorder and post-traumatic stress disorder, and that she had been involuntarily hospitalized after graduating from Iowa, signing her book's contract the day after her release. The article also revealed that Bello had been involved in two previous plagiarism controversies: a poetry slam competition in Beijing, in which she plagiarized the poem "dogs!" by Danez Smith; and a submission to her fiction workshop at Iowa, in which she plagiarized a passage from Carmen Maria Machado's short story "Inventory." Bello apologized for her actions, saying that she had "made mistakes" and "hurt people terribly" while struggling with psychiatric treatment, external pressures, and life events.

In November 2024, Bello announced that she planned to complete her PhD the following year, using a novel manuscript as her dissertation. The following month, she revealed that she was working on a novel titled Ho(us)e.

== Reception ==
Before its release, The Leaving received a positive blurb from author Lidia Yuknavitch, who described the book as "nothing short of thrilling." The novel had also appeared on multiple lists of the "most anticipated" books of 2022.
