= Moonlight People =

2019 Russian independent film

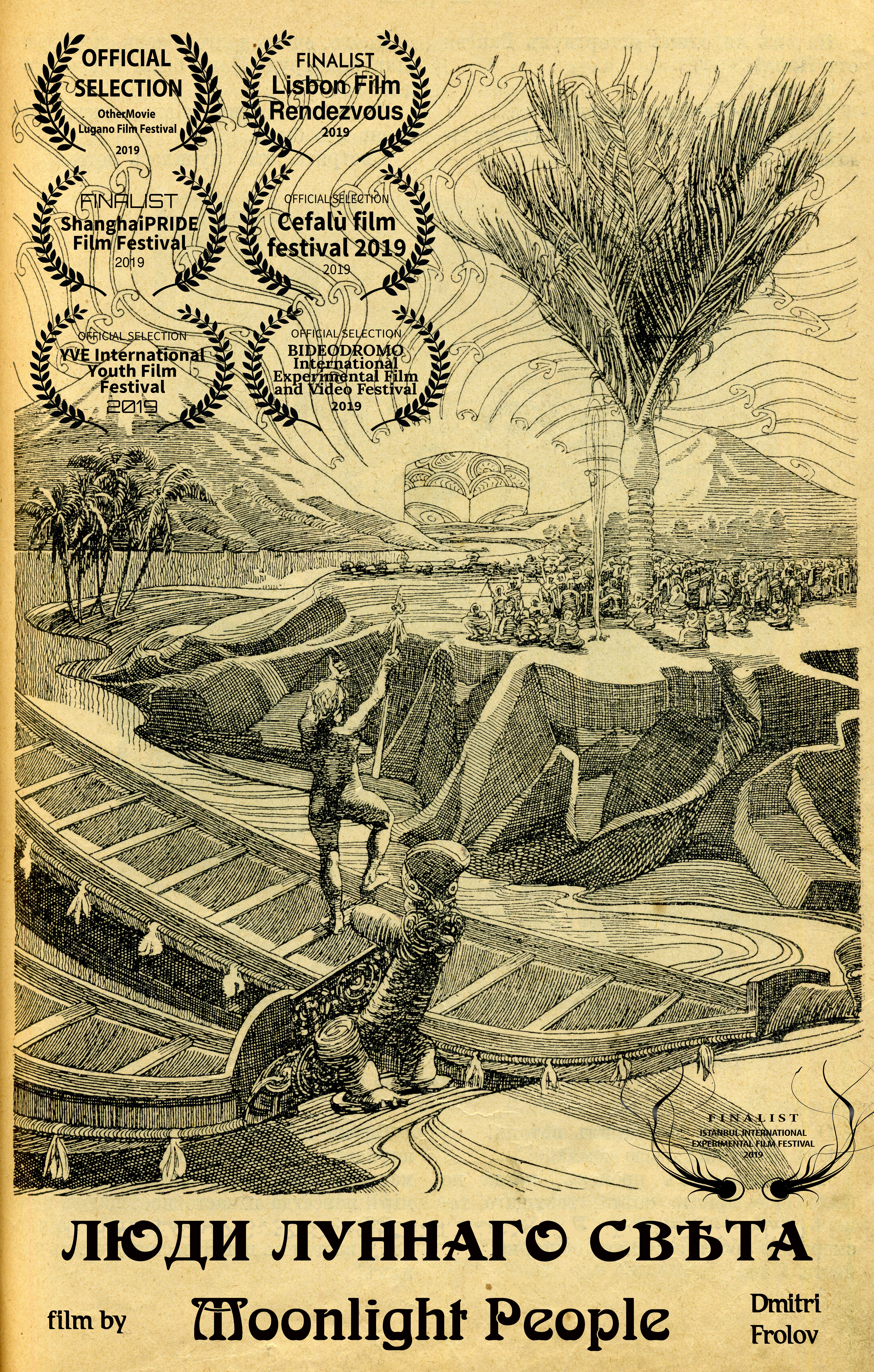
- Film poster
- Russian: Люди луннаго свѣта
- Directed by: Dmitrii Frolov
- Written by: Dmitrii Frolov
- Based on: Moonlight People by Vasily Rozanov
- Starring: Natalya Surkova; Yuri Jadrovsky; Vladimir Zolotar; Darya Alymova
- Cinematography: Dmitrii Frolov
- Edited by: Dmitrii Frolov
- Music by: Aleksandr Skryabin
- Production company: NEO-film
- Release date: 14 April 2019 (Lugano Film Festival)
- Running time: 14 minutes
- Country: Russia

Moonlight People (Russian: Люди луннаго свѣта, romanized: Ludi lunnago svyeta) is a black-and-white 2019 Russian independent film directed by Dmitrii Frolov. It is based on Vasily Rozanov treatise Moonlight People. Treatise by Vasily Rozanov, devoted to the study of sexuality and its denial in Christianity. Published in St. Petersburg in 1911.

Rozanov hypothesizes that Jehovah (the biblical God), who created the world, needed a second female hypostasis. Rozanov does not miss the opportunity to criticize the sanctimonious morality in matters of sex, which prohibits early marriages, but looks through his fingers at Masturbation and prostitution. Rozanov was interested in the possibility of copulation without sin, reproach and modesty. Rozanov sex sharply distinguishes the old Covenant with its polygamy of the patriarchs ("religion of the sacred childbirth") and the New Covenant with his apologia middle floor (of unigov). If the old Testament calls to be fruitful and multiply, in the New Testament like they say "ignorance is multiplying" living "like the angels".

== Plot ==
Two young men and two girls on a moonlit night confess to each other in their strange fantasies and loves that go beyond the usual standards. Each of the young people recalls their erotic adventures and talk about them at the table after dinner on a moonlit night. After that, two figures playing chess suddenly appear in the room. The film ends with universal enthusiasm on the seashore. The impetus to making the film was the book of the same name by the Russian religious philosopher Vasily Rozanov, who died 100 years ago. His treatise was devoted to the study of sexuality and its denial in Christianity.

The film was made in the style of experimental films of the 1920s with a non-linear narration full of strange surrealistic images. It is black and white and devoid of dialogue. Filmed on film 16 mm of firm "Svema", released in the USSR. This added to its exoticism. The image was put to the music of Alexander Scriabin The Poem of Ecstasy (1907).

== Cast ==
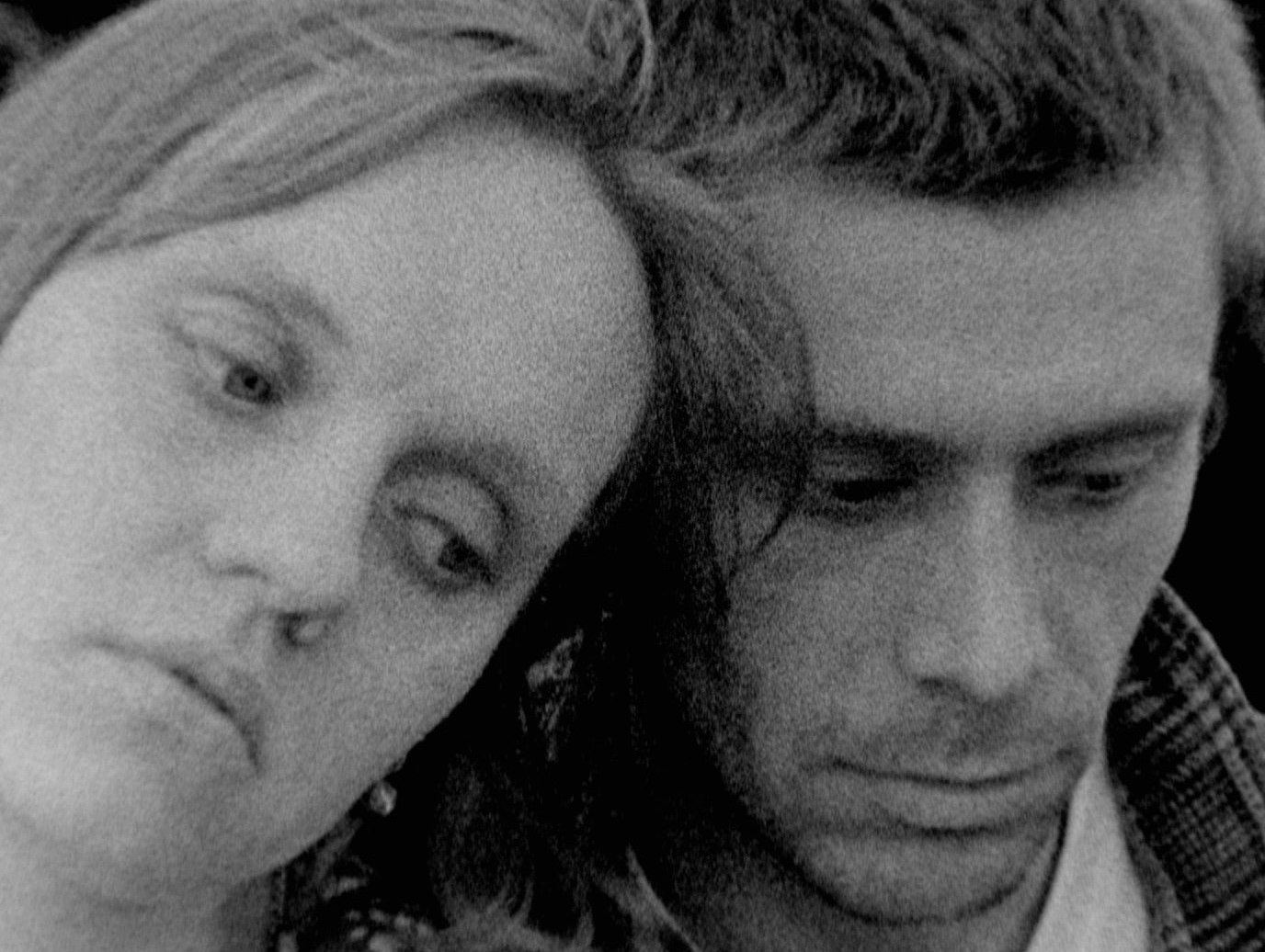
Natalya Surkova and Yuri Jadrovsky in the film

- Natalya Surkova as Initial
- Yuri Jadrovsky as The first man
- Vladimir Zolotar as Second man
- Darya Alymova as Second

== Festivals ==
- Closing film at the OtherMovie 8th Lugano Film Festival, Lugano, Switzerland, April 14, 2019
- Finalist at ShanghaiPRIDE Film Festival, Shanghay, China, June, 2019;
- Best Poster at Buenos Aires International Festival of Independent Cinema, Buenos Aires, Argentina, October, 2019
- Kautik International Student Film Festival, Marchula, India, November, 2019
