= Resound (album) =

Studio album by Ugress
- Released: 2002
- Recorded: 2002
- Genre: Electronica
- Length: 52:21
- Label: Tuba Records/Port Azur, Uncanny Planet Records

Ugress chronology
Resound (2002)	Cinematronics (2004)

Resound is the first album released by the Norwegian electronica project Ugress. It was released on Tuba Records/Port Azur in 2002.

Professional ratings
Review scores
Source	Rating
Bergens tidende	5/6 hearts
Verdens gang	4/6
Bergensavisen	5/6
Nordlys	6/6
Dagbladet	5/6
Aftenposten	5/6

== Charts ==
Chart (2002–2004)	Peak position
Norwegian Albums (VG-lista)	2

== Track listing ==
1. "Spider-Man Theme"
2. "Queen Of Darkness"
3. "E-Pipe"
4. "Reason To Believe"
5. "Decepticons"
6. "Loungemeister"
7. "Falling"
8. "Autumn Colours"
9. "Trigger 22"
10. "Kaleido Scope"
11. "Atlantis Coastguard Corruption"

== Samples used ==
1. Spider-Man Theme - Beginning from 1960s animated TV series theme.

4. Reason to Believe - Stay with us, we can all be happy here from HellRaiser 1 (1987) and the speech delivered by the gameshow host of The Running Man show at the end of the movie with the same name, featuring Arnold Schwarzenegger (1987).

5. Decepticons - speech by Orson Welles from the Transformers animated movie (1986)
