= Sarah Pucill =

Sarah Pucill is a London-based film artist. Her work is distributed by LUX, London and LightCone, Paris. She is a Reader at University of Westminster. Central to her work is "a concern with mortality and the materiality of the filmmaking process". Much of her work appears within the restrictions of domestic spaces. In her "explorations of the animate and inanimate, her work probes a journey between mirror and surface".

== Career ==
Pucill studied in London at the Slade School of Fine Art. You Be Mother (1990), was Pucill's first film. It won awards for Best Innovation, Atlanta, 1995; and Best Experimental Film, Oberhausen, 1991. In 2011, it was exhibited in "Moving Portraits" at the De La Warr Pavilion, Bexhill, Sussex, and in 2004 at A Century of Artists' Film in Britain at Tate Britain.

The 1990s saw the emergence of Pucill's particular artistic vision in experimental film, and her work has appeared internationally in both galleries and cinemas. Retrospective screenings including "A History of Artists Film and Video" (2007) have been held at BFI Southbank in 2011, to commemorate 50 years since Maya Deren's death. Pucill's work was included in "Assembly: A survey of recent artists" film and video in Britain 2008–2013' at Tate Britain, 2014.

Her 2010 film, Phantom Rhapsody was shown at the Edinburgh International Film Festival, and at the L'École nationale supérieure des Beaux-Arts Paris, and at the Tate Britain, Millennium Film, Anthology Film Archives, New York, Pleasure Dome, Toronto. The film examines the phantom's appearance and disappearance in relation to the "present/absent dynamic of visible lesbian sexuality" in both the history of cinema and art history.

In 2013, her film Magic Mirror was funded by Arts Council England and published as a DVD by LUX. Magic Mirror examines the word and image connections in Claude Cahun's writing from her book Aveux non avenus (Disavowals) through a re-staging of her photographs. Magic Mirror, which is "part essay, part film poem", seeks to explore the links between Cahun's photographs and her writings. The film premiered at Tate Modern in April 2013, and was shown at the Institute of Contemporary Arts.

"Magic Mirror" was staged as an exhibition at the Nunnery Gallery, London, in the exhibition "Magic Mirror" (17 April – 14 June 2015), curated by Karen Leroy-Harris which showed photographs by Claude Cahun, with the film and photographs by Sarah Pucill.

In 2016, Pucill completed her second 16mm film that re-stages photographs by Claude Cahun; "Confessions to the Mirror" (2016), which was funded by Arts Council England. The film premiered at London Film Festival, 2016 and was produced as a blu-ray by LUX, London.

"Confessions to the Mirror" (2016) was exhibited in the exhibition, "Under the Skin" that showed photographs by Claude Cahun at Cobra Museum of Modern Art, Amstelveen, Holland at (October 2020 – May 2021). The exhibition toured with "Confessions to the Mirror" to Kunsthal Museum Gallery, Rotterdam, 2022.

In 2019, Pucill exhibited the film installation "Garden Self Portraits" (2019) which includes clips from "Confessions to the Mirror" at Ottawa Art Gallery, Ottawa in the exhibition "Facing Claude Cahun and Marcel Moore", (Sep14th2019-Feb9th2020), curated by Michelle Gewurtz.

Pucill's film "Eye Cut" (16mm col, 20min, 2021) premiered at the London Film Festival in 2021. It won best experimental film at Toronto Women Film Festival 2021 and Best Experimental Film award at London New Wave Cinema.

She appears in a documentary "Gelebte Träume – Künstlerinnen des Surrealismus" by Maria Anna Tappeiner for ARTE TV, Germany, that shows clips from her Cahun films(2013,2016). Her films have been screened at numerous international film festivals, including: the BFI London Film Festival, the International Short Film Festival Oberhausen, the Ann Arbor Film Festival, European Media Art Festival, Berlinale and the Montréal Festival of New Cinema. Television broadcasts of her films include: BSB TV Australia (Mirrored Measure, 1996), Carlton Television (Backcomb, 1995), and Granada TV (You Be Mother, 1980).

She has been teaching at the University of Westminster since 2000 where she is currently a Reader and where she received a PhD in 2014.

== Filmography ==
Pucill's films include:

- You Be Mother (1990)
- Milk and Glass (1993)
- Backcomb (199)
- Mirrored Measure (1996)
- Swollen Stigma (1998)
- Cast (2000)
- Stages Of Mourning (2004)
- Taking My Skin (2006)
- Blind Light (2007)
- Fall In Frame (2009)
- Phantom Rhapsody (2010)
- Magic Mirror (2013)
- "Confessions To The Mirror" (2016)
- "Eye Cut" (2021)
