= Reminiscience =

Studio album by Ugress
- Released: 2009
- Genre: Electronica
- Length: 45:02
- Label: Tuba Records/Port Azur, Uncanny Planet Records

Ugress chronology
Unicorn (2008)	Reminiscience (2009)	Collectronics (2010)

Reminiscience is the fourth album released by the Norwegian electronica project Ugress. It was released on Tuba Records/Port Azur in 2009.

Professional ratings
Review scores
Source	Rating
Bergens tidende	5/6 hearts
Bergensavisen	4/6
Adresseavisen	4/6
Stavanger aftenblad	4/6
Trønder-avisa	4/6
Aftenposten	4/6

== Track listing ==
1. "AMZ 1974"
2. "Chrome Shuriken Dragonfire"
3. "Numb"
4. "New Shoes Escape Manoeuvre"
5. "It Was A Great Year (Movies With Robots)"
6. "The Bosporus Incident"
7. "Cthulhu's Night Out"
8. "Sandtraps"
9. "Apocalypse Please Wait Buffering"
10. "Sordid Pulse"
11. "Malaria 22"
12. "Win Without Triumph"
