= Videophilia (and Other Viral Syndromes) =

2015 film

- Film poster
- Spanish: Videofilia: y otros síndromes virales
- Directed by: Juan Daniel F. Molero
- Written by: Juan Daniel F. Molero
- Starring: Liliana Albornoz
- Release dates: 25 January 2015 (IFFR); 16 August 2016 (Peru)
- Running time: 112 minutes
- Country: Peru
- Language: Spanish

Videophilia (and Other Viral Syndromes) (Spanish: Videofilia: y otros síndromes virales) is a 2015 Peruvian horror comedy-drama fantasy film directed by Juan Daniel F. Molero. It premiered during the 2015 edition of the International Film Festival Rotterdam where it was awarded with the Tiger Award. Later it was selected as the Peruvian entry for the Best Foreign Language Film at the 89th Academy Awards but it was not nominated.

== Cast ==
- Muki Sabogal as Luz
- TerOm as Junior
- Liliana Albornoz as Rosa
- Caterina Gueli Rojo as Virus
- Rafael Gutiérrez as Killer
- Michel Lovón as Mike
- Tilsa Otta as Luz's Sister
- José Gabriel Alegría Sabogal as Luis
- Manuel Siles as Luz's father

== See also ==
- List of submissions to the 89th Academy Awards for Best Foreign Language Film
- List of Peruvian submissions for the Academy Award for Best Foreign Language Film
