= The Second Game =

- Film poster
- Directed by: Corneliu Porumboiu
- Produced by: 42 Km Film
- Narrated by: Corneliu Porumboiu; Adrian Porumboiu
- Release date: 2 April 2014
- Running time: 97 minutes
- Country: Romania
- Language: Romanian

The Second Game (Romanian: Al doilea joc) is a 2014 Romanian documentary film directed by Corneliu Porumboiu.

== Summary ==
The film integrally depicts the Dinamo — Steaua football derby played on 3 December 1988; the game is commented on by Porumboiu and his father, Adrian, the referee of that match.

== Release ==
It was selected for the Forum section at the 64th Berlin International Film Festival.

== See also ==
- Romanian New Wave
- 2014 in film
- Minimalist film
