= Jasmina Cibic =

Slovenian artist and filmmaker

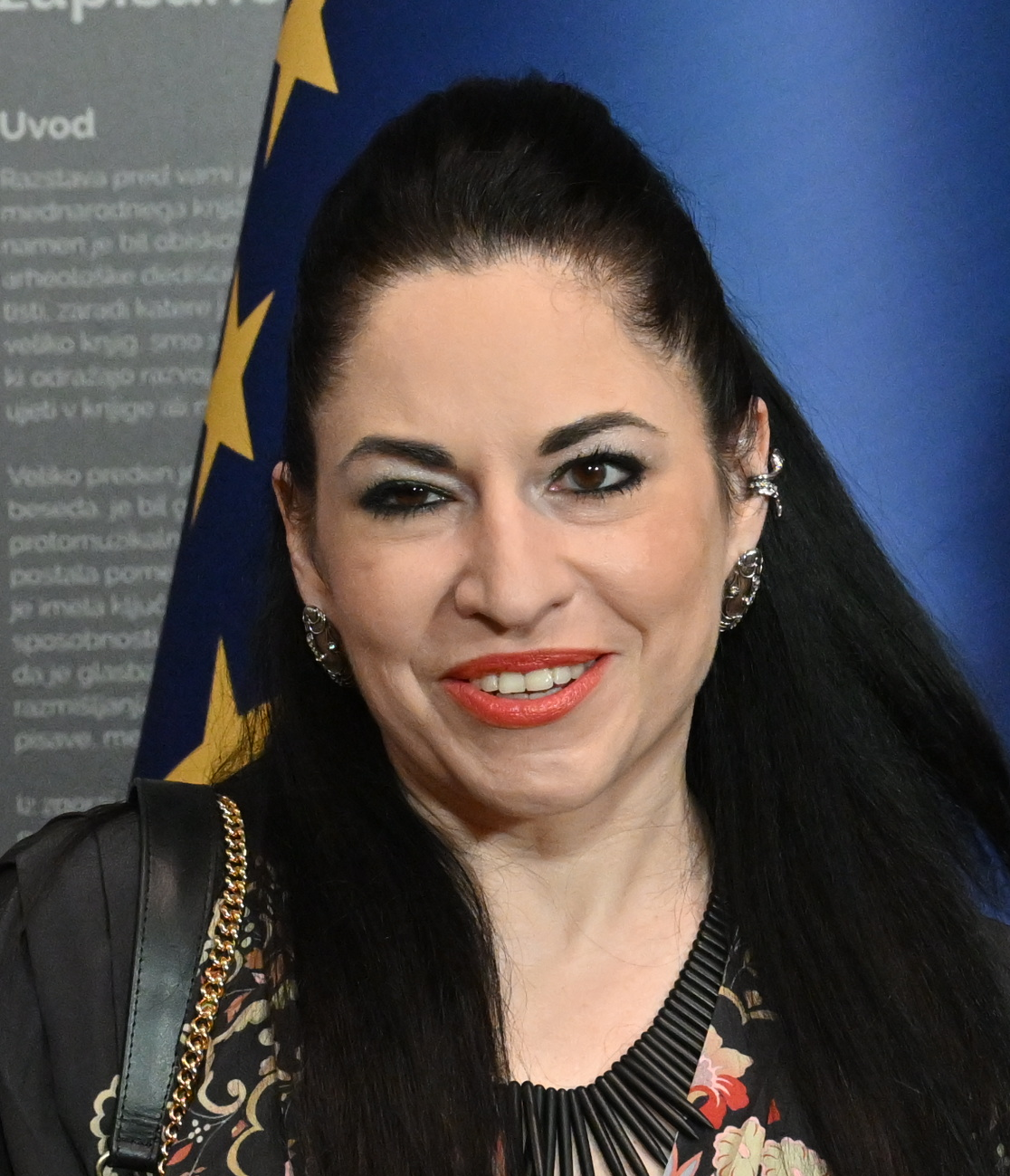
- Jasmina Cibic in 2026
- Born: 1979 (age 46–47); Ljubljana, SR Slovenia, SFR Yugoslavia
- Education: Accademia di Belle Arti di Venezia; Goldsmiths, University of London (MFA)
- Known for: Film, installation, performance art
- Awards: Film London Jarman Award (2021); B3 Biennial of the Moving Image Award (2020); MAC International Ulster Bank Award (2016); Charlottenborg Fonden Award (2016); Aesthetica Film Festival Best Artist's Film (2024)

Jasmina Cibic (born 1979 in Ljubljana) is a Slovenian artist who lives and works in London.

== Early life and education ==
Cibic was born in Ljubljana, then part of Yugoslavia, in 1979. She studied at the Accademia di Belle Arti in Venice and at Goldsmiths, University of London, where she graduated with a Master of Fine Arts in 2006.

== Art career ==
In 2013, Cibic represented Slovenia in its Pavilion at the 55th Venice Biennale, with a project entitled For Our Economy and Culture. This included two films shot at official state locations, One, Framing the Space, was shot at Josep Broz Tito's residence at Lake Bled, where he received royalty and other dignitaries, and dramatised a conversation between state architect Vinko Glanz and a journalist about the uses of national architecture. The other, The Fruit of Our Lands, recreated a Yugoslav parliamentary debate held in 1957 to discuss which artworks might be suitable to "decorate" the newly built People's Assembly (now the National Assembly Building of Slovenia), designed and built between 1954 and 1959 by Glanz. Cibic told Aesthetica that she found the transcript of this debate - which her film re-enacted word-for-word, and played on a continuous loop - "in a dank garage within a shopping trolley filled with the archives of the former Yugoslav state architect", and that she had not found any record of it in official state archives.

Spielraum: The Nation Loves It (2015), which featured a woman practising a speech to launch a new "ambitious building programme", also used found dialogue but removed specific names from speeches, referring instead to "the artist" or "our country". The final part of her Spielraum trilogy, Tear Down and Rebuild (2015) was filmed inside the Modernist interior of the former Palace of the Federation building (now the Palace of Serbia) in Belgrade, using quotations pulled from speeches by Ronald Reagan, Prince Charles, Benito Mussolini, Margaret Thatcher and others, as well as architectural theory and Yugoslav debates, for its dialogue.

The Pavilion (2015) was a short, experimental documentary about the (Serbian, Croatian and Slovene) Kingdom of Yugoslavia's Pavilion for the 1929 Barcelona International Exposition (Expo '29). The Yugoslav entry, designed by Serbian modernist architect Dragiša Brašovan, supposedly won the Grand Prix and then lost it to Ludwig Mies van der Rohe's design for Germany due to political intrigue. In the video, a narrator described Cibic's methods to retrace the lost Pavilion, which was torn down after the end of Expo '29, as five performers built a model of Brašovan's star-shaped building in 1:7 scale.

In 2021, Cibic was named winner of the Jarman Award for her work The Gift.

== See also ==
- Political art
- Contemporary art
- BioArt
- Soft power
