= R TV Network =

UK broadcasting company

Reminiscent TV Network or R TV was a TV network in the United Kingdom, founded in April 1999. It was planned to be the first network to introduce the subscription model to Asian programming on the Sky Digital platform. The idea was to provide channels which would launch free to air initially, then once an audience had been gained, to convert some of the channels to pay TV. Six channels were launched in the years 2000 and 2001; each channel catered a different linguistic community. The ultimate goal was to launch eight channels.

Reminiscent also operated RITV, an Indian subsidiary. Its goal was to produce programmes in India and later send them to the UK.

The network got into financial trouble long before subscriptions would have become viable, and all its channels were pulled off air over a period of few weeks in early 2002. After its closure, rumours emerged that Star TV would acquire a 30% stake in its Indian subsidiary RITV, Star TV denied.

== List of channels ==
=== Launched or acquired ===
- Anjuman TV - Urdu Language
- Asia 1 TV - Hindi
- Cee (I) TV - Tamil
- Gurjari TV - Gujarati
- Lashkara TV - Punjabi
- Sonali TV - Bengali

=== Proposed but never launched ===
- African Caribbean Entertainment
- Raag TV - Music Channel
