= Reminiscences (2010 film) =

Reminiscencias
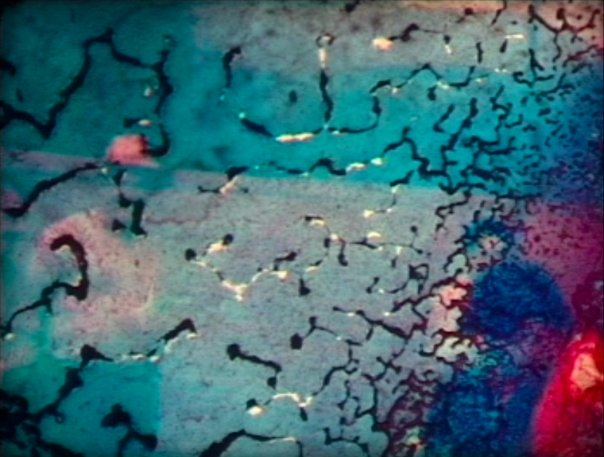
- Film still
- Directed by: Juan Daniel F. Molero
- Written by: Juan Daniel F. Molero
- Produced by: Juan Daniel F. Molero
- Starring: Juan Daniel F. Molero
- Cinematography: Juan Daniel F. Molero
- Edited by: Juan Daniel F. Molero
- Production company: Tiempo Libre
- Release dates: March 2010 (Guadalajara Film Festival); December 1, 2010 (Peru)
- Running time: 84 minutes
- Country: Peru
- Languages: Spanish; English; Quechua

Reminiscencias is a 2010 Peruvian experimental documentary film written, produced, and directed by Juan Daniel F. Molero.

== Background ==
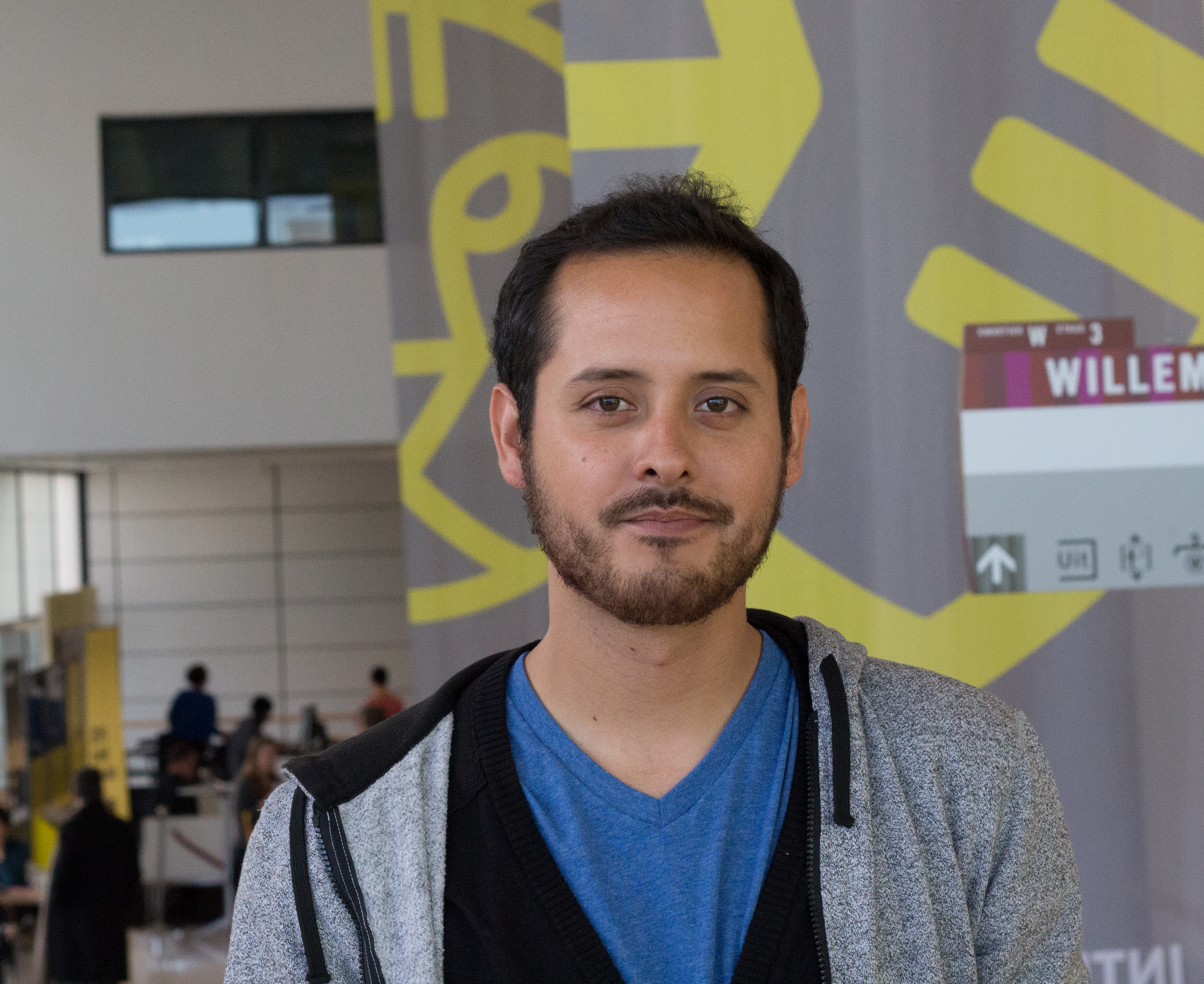
Juan Daniel F. Molero at the International Film Festival Rotterdam in January 2015

Juan Daniel F. Molero recovered from a bout of amnesia incurred as a result of a sandboarding accident by reviewing home video footage shot by himself, his father, and his grandfather in various formats. He subsequently took the old and new footage and created a feature film of the events, with one-third of the final film recorded just after the accident. Using a "chaotic" editing technique which combined footage from SVHS-C, MiniDV tapes, cellphone videos and an 8mm home movie archive, the 84-minute film simulates the amnesia and recovery by Molero in 2009.

== Synopsis ==
Reminiscencias deals with the creation and loss of memory and identity though an autobiographic exploration based on the filmmaker's own 2009 instance of amnesia. Molero had to use home movies shot by his father and grandfather, as well as digital footage shot by himself and video clips from his cell phone to determine his own past and find his identity.

== Reception ==
Indiewire observed that while "many avant-garde films feel derivative", Molero's was an original, in that its "combination of abstractions and concrete reality--achingly gorgeous and poignant--is unique." They also offered that the film was a "singular observation of life in Peru", shown through its interviews of indigenous Peruvian people, the filmmaker's "observations of life in urban Lima", and his offering of Peru's natural settings.

== Release ==
The film first screened in a shorter version in April 2009 at the 'Centro Cultural Cafae', and in May 2009, at Universidad Cayetano Heredia and Universidad Tecnológica del Perú in Lima, and then on July 3, 2009, at the Peruvian Cultural Center hosted by the 'Comité de Administración del Fondo de Asistencia' as part of a 10-film retrospective of Molero's earlier works. When interviewed, he explained that a longer version was forthcoming.

The film's longer version screened at the 25th annual Guadalajara Film Festival in March 2010, and at the Marseille Festival of Documentary Film. In 2011, it screened at the Buenos Aires International Festival of Independent Cinema in April, and was scheduled to have its United States premiere at the Museum of Modern Art in New York City on December 19, 2011.
