= Cinema of Madagascar =

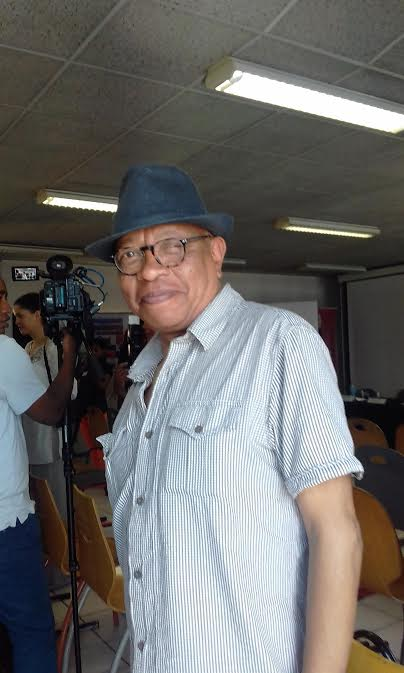
Malagasy film director Raymond Rajaonarivelo (born at Antananarivo, 1949).

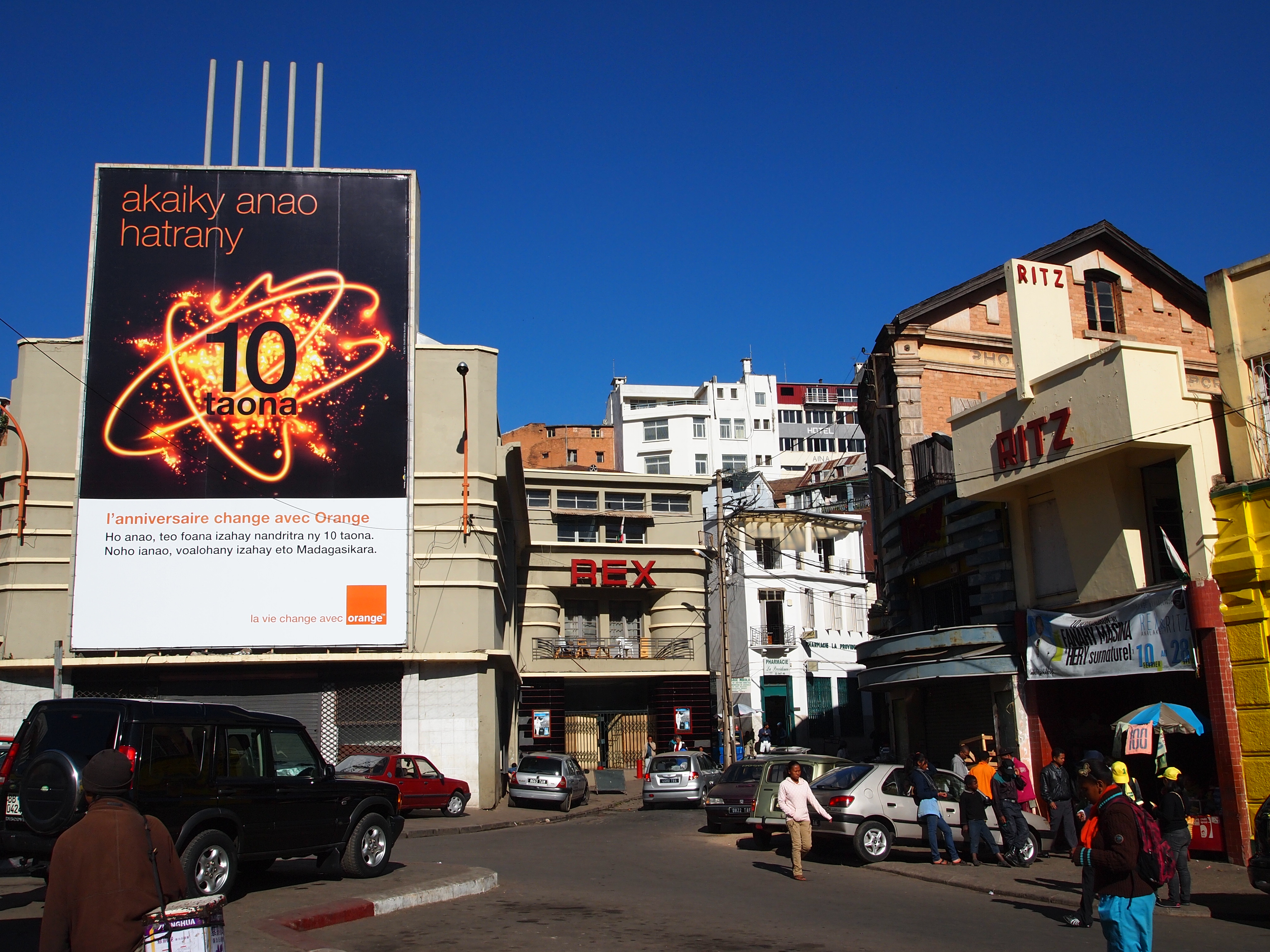
Former cinemas Rex and Ritz in Antananarivo, 2013 (?).

The cinema of Madagascar refers to the film industry in Madagascar.

The most notable director is Raymond Rajaonarivelo, director of movies such as When the Stars Meet the Sea and Tabataba (English: Rumors).

The oldest cinematographic production entirely produced in Madagascar by a Malagasy is a 22-minute black-and-white movie entitled Rasalama Martiora (English: Rasalama, the Martyr). Directed in 1937 by the deacon Philippe Raberojo, it marked the centenary of the death of the Protestant martyr Rafaravavy Rasalama. Philippe Raberojo was the president of an association of French citizens of Malagasy origin, where he had access to a 9.5mm camera. Thus he was able to realise his film. The complete version is lost.

In the following years there was considerable political upheaval in the country. In 1960 independence was regained in Madagascar, but political instability remains. This complicated post-colonial period led to the closure or transformation of the country's cinemas into places of religious worship.

The film industry started to recover slowly around the year 2006 also due to the founding of Rencontres du Film Court Madagascar, which is the only film festival in the country.

Around 60 short films and 1 or 2 feature films are made each year. Most Malagasy productions receive no public funding.

In the Malagasy language, the word “cinema” is translated “sarimihetsika” which literally means “moving image”.

== Films ==
| Year | Title | Director | Genre | Notes |
|---|---|---|---|---|
| 1937 | Rasalama maritiora (Rasalama, the Martyr) | Philippe Raberojo | Black and white documentary | Portrait of the Protestant martyr Rasalama Rafaravavy (1810 – 1837) at the centenary of this death. 22 minutes. |
| 1973 | L'accident (The Accident) | Benoît Ramampy | Drama short | Best short film award Panafrican Film and Television Festival of Ouagadougou (FESPACO), 1973. A son kills his father by accident. |
| 1974 | Very Remby | Ignace Solo Randrasana | Drama | Jean Soutter Award at the Dinard Festival du film britannique, France, 1974. 90 minutes. |
| 1980 | Fitampoha | Jacques Lombard and Jean-Claude Rahaga | Documentary | 77 minutes. |
| 1984 | Dahalo, Dahalo, il était une fois le moyen ouest (Dahalo, Dahalo, Once upon a Time in the Midwest) | Benoît Ramampy | Drama | 75 minutes. |
| 1987 | Ilo Tsy Very (Eternal Blessing) | Ignace Solo Randrasana | Drama | The story of Madagascar from 1895 to 1975, including the 1947 Malagasy Uprising. 90 minutes. |
| 1988 | Tabataba (Rumors) | Raymond Rajaonarivelo | Drama feature | Story of a small Malagasy village during the independence uprising. 76 minutes. |
| 1989 | Le Prix de la paix (The Price of Peace) | Abel Rakotozanany and Benoît Ramampy | Short drama | Shown at the African Film Festival in Montreal in 1988. 72 minutes. |
| 1989 | Angano... Angano... nouvelles de Madagascar | Marie-Clémence Paes, Cesar Paes | Documentary | Storytellers recount the Malagasy founding myths. 64 minutes. |
| 1996 | Quand les étoiles rencontrent la mer (When the Stars Meet the Sea) | Raymond Rajaonarivelo | Drama | Depicts the Malagasy liberation struggle. Best Film award Istanbul Film Festival (1998). 86 minutes. |
| 2001 | Makibefo | Alexander Abela | Drama | Based on William Shakespeare's Macbeth. 73 minutes. |
| 2004 | Souli | Alexander Abela | Drama | Based on William Shakespeare's Othello. 94 minutes. |
| 2004 | Sur les murs de la ville (On the walls of the city) | Fabrice Maminirina Razafindralambo | Short animation | The first Malagasy animation short film in official competition at Annecy International Animated Film Festival 2004, 5 minutes. |
| 2005 | Mahaleo | Marie-Clémence Paes and Raymond Rajaonarivelo | Documentary | Traces the history of Mahaleo, Madagascar's most popular folk-pop band. Best Documentary award at the 2006 Festival Regards sur le cinéma du monde de Rouen. Public Award and second place at the 2005 Festival international du film insulaire de Groix. |
| 2006 | The sun rises...then sets | Jiva Eric Razafindralambo | Short animation | Best Film Rencontres du Film Court Madagascar 2006. |
| 2007 | Raketa mena (Red Cactus) | Hery A. Rasolo | Documentary | Award Festival Ciné Sud de Cozès (Charente-Maritime). 52 minutes. |
| 2007 | Tafasiry | Toky Randriamahazosoa | Short | Best Film Rencontres du Film Court Madagascar 2007. |
| 2010 | Varavarankely | Sitraka Randriamahaly | Short | Best Animation Film Rencontres du Film Court Madagascar in 2010. |
| 2011 | Dzaomalaza et le saphir bleu (Dzaomalaza and the Blue Sapphire) | Andriamanisa Radoniaina and Mamihasina Raminosoa | Fiction feature | Dzaomalaza goes in search of a unique sapphire in Southern Madagascar in order to enrich himself. But three women are in his path. 60 minutes. |
| 2012 | Malagasy Mankany | Haminiaina Ratovoarivony | Road-movie | Diaspora Award Hollywood Black Film Festival 2013, USA. Audience Award Festival of African Cinema (then Festival Cine Africano Cordoba 2013, Spain), Youth Jury Award at Cinémas d'Afrique 2013, France. Africa Connexion Award at Vues d'Afrique film Festival 2014, Canada. Best feature film and best actress at Iarivo film festival 2014, Madagascar. Jury special mention Festival du Cinéma Africain de Khouribga 2013, Morocco. 93 minutes. |
| 2012 | La photographie - Sary Iray Tsy Nipika | David Randriamanana | Short | Second place FESPACO festival, Ouagadougou 2013. An old lady is waiting for her grandson. 18 minutes. |
| 2013 | Madame Esther | Luck Razanajaona | Short | Second prize Carthage Film Festival, Tunisia 2014. Second place FESPACO festival, Ouagadougou 2015. 15 minutes. |
| 2014 | Ady gasy | Lova Nantenaina | Documentary | Prix Fétnèt Ocean Indien at the Festival international du film d'Afrique et des îles de La Réunion (FIFAI), La Réunion. Grand Prix Eden Documentaire at the Lumières d'Afrique, Besançon. Mention spéciale du Jury documentaire at the Festival international du film de Ouidah, Bénin, also known as Festival Quintessence. “The Chinese make things, the Malagasy fix them.” 84 minutes. |
| 2014 | Odyaina, fragments of lives | Laza Razanajatovo | Documentary | Shows the relationship between music and mental illness, through the work of some malagasy music therapist. 85 minutes. |
| 2015 | Fasa | Laza Razanajatovo | Short | We observe Fasa as she is coping with the loss of her father. |
| 2019 | Fahavalo, Madagascar 1947 | Marie-Clémence Andriamonta-Paes | Historical war documentary | Doc of the World Award Montreal World Film Festival, Special Mention Carthage Film Festival. 90 minutes. |
| 2022 | Joe | Zo Tahiana Hariminoson | Thriller | |
| 2024 | Disco Afrika : A Malagasy Story | Luck Razanajaona | Drama | Film selected at the 74th Berlin International Film Festival in the Generation competition. |
