= List of Cape Verdean actors =

This is a list of notable actors and actresses from Cape Verde. This list includes members of the Cabo Verdean diaspora.

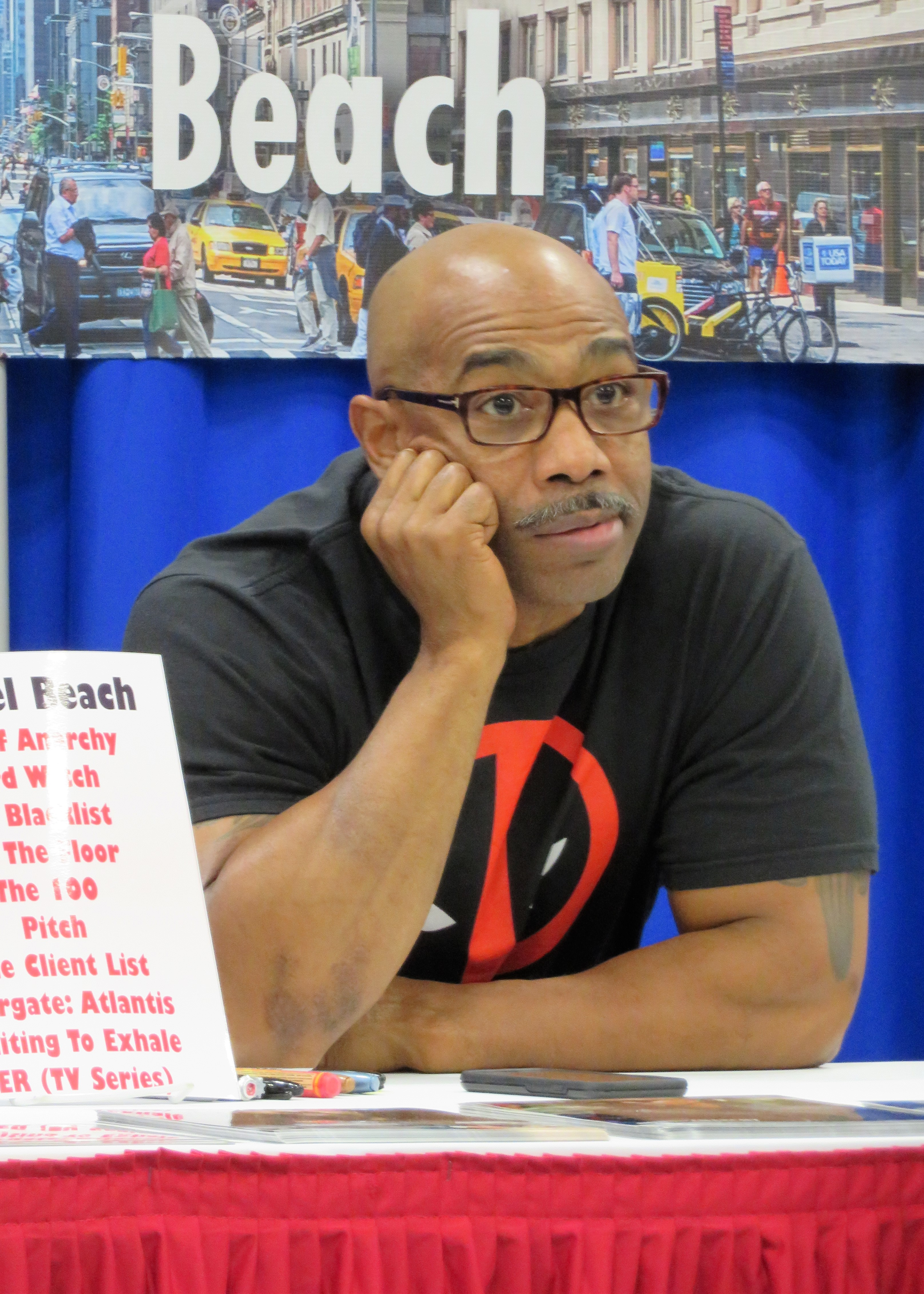
Michael Beach, 2017

== A ==
- Claire Andrade-Watkins

== B ==
- Michael Beach

== E ==
- Cesária Évora

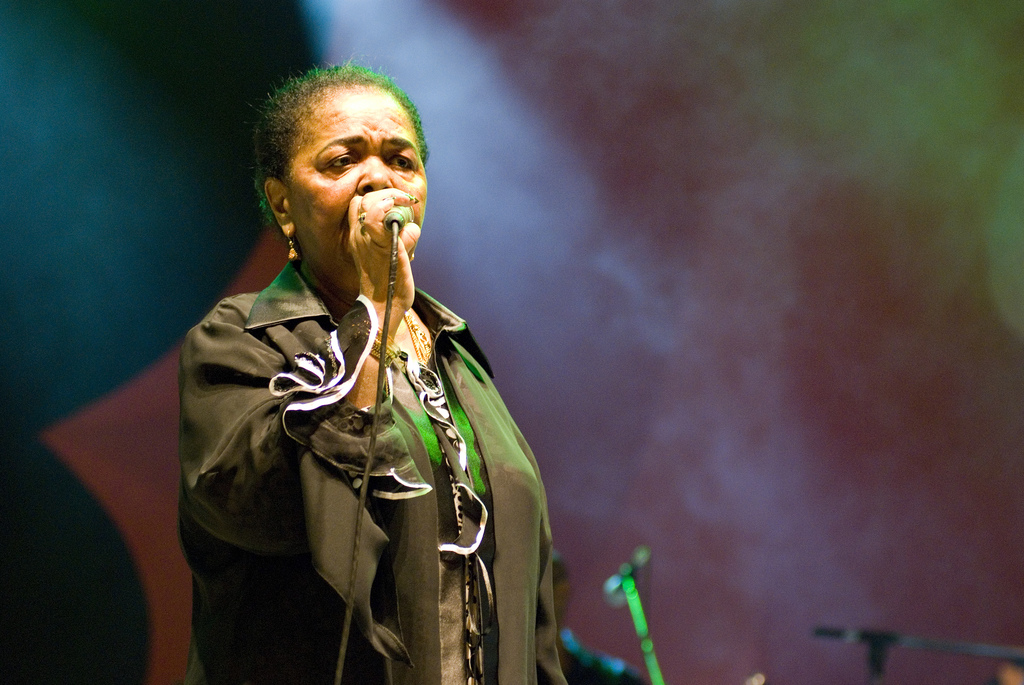
Cesária Évora, 2008

== H ==
- Ashley Holliday

== M ==
- Sara Martins
- Aeriél Miranda

== R ==
- Tim Reid
- Kali Reis
- Amber Rose
- Anika Noni Rose

== T ==
- Chelsea Tavares

== V ==
- Vitalina Varela
- Samira Vera-Cruz

== See also ==
- List of Cape Verdean people
- Cinema of Cape Verde
- List of film festivals in Cape Verde
