= List of Portuguese-language films =

The following is a list of Portuguese-language films.

- At Midnight I'll Take Your Soul (1964)
- Awakening of the Beast (1970)
- Central Station (1998)
- Behind the Sun (2001)
- Bus 174 (Ônibus 174) (2002)
- Carandiru (2003)
- City of God (2003)
- The Forest (2002)
- Juventude em Marcha (2006)
- Lower City (2006)
- Lula, Son of Brazil (2010)
- Madame Satã (2002)
- Nise: The Heart of Madness (2015)
- No Quarto da Vanda (2000)
- So Normal (2003)
- Ossos (1997)
- The Three Marias (2002)
- This Night I Will Possess Your Corpse (1967)
- Elite Squad (2007)
- Adão e Eva (1995)
- Call Girl (2007)
- Arte de Roubar (2008)
- balas e bolinhos (2001)
- As bodas de Deus (1999)
- Branca de Neve (2000)
- A carta (1999)
- Backlight (2010)
- Complexo - Universo Paralelo (2010)
- Dot.Com (2007)
- Kilas, o mau da fita (1980)
- Non ou a Vã Glória de Mandar (1990)

== See also ==
- List of Brazilian films
- List of Portuguese films
