= Cinema of Cape Verde =

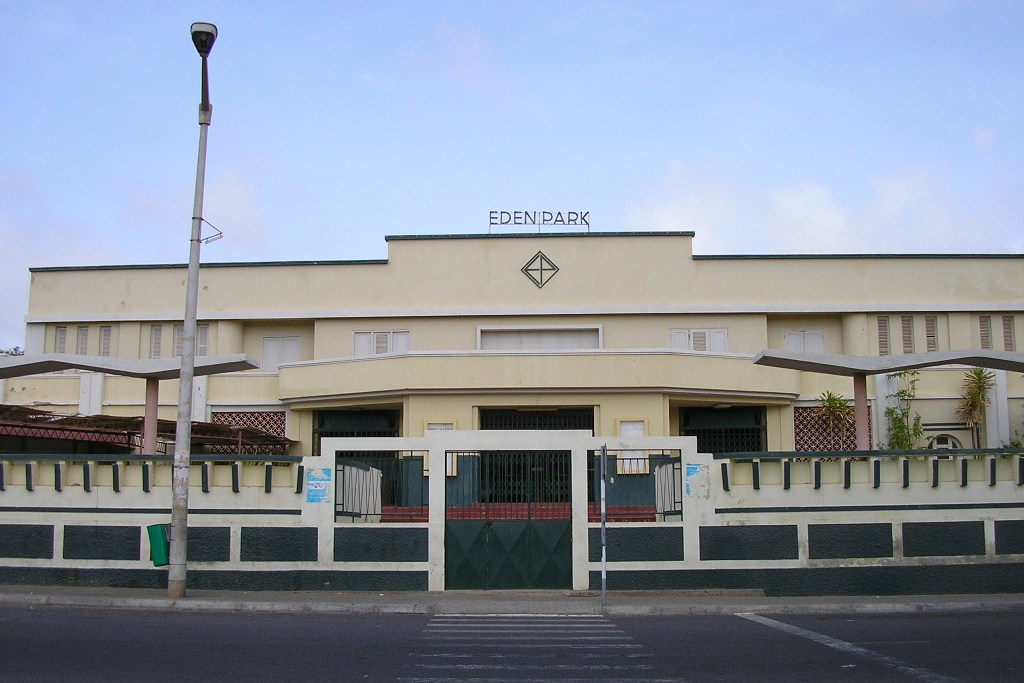
Eden Park, the first picture house and cinema in Cape Verde

The history of the cinema of Cape Verde dates back to the arrival of filmmakers in the early twentieth century. The first picture house was established in Mindelo around 1922, called Eden Park.

The nation has two film festivals that occur annually. The Cabo Verde International Film Festival (CVIFF) was first held in 2010 and takes place on the island of Sal. The DjarFogo International Film Festival (DIFF) was founded in 2019 by Cape Verdean filmmaker and media professor Guenny K. Pires. It takes place on the islands of Santiago and Fogo, though it has two headquarters: one in Cape Verde, and one in the United States (Los Angeles, California).

== Films ==
- Os Flagelados do Vento Leste (1987)
- Down to Earth (1995) - drama film, directed by Pedro Costa
- The Island of Contenda (1995) - drama film
- Napomuceno's Will (1997)
- Fintar o Destino (1998) - sports film
- My Voice (Nha Fala) (2002)
- The Journey of Cape Verde (2004)
- Some Kind of Funny Porto Rican?': A Cape Verdean American Story (2006)
- Batuque, the Soul of a People (2006) - a film about the music and dance genre of batuque
- Santo Antão - Paisagem & Melodia (2006) [English: Santo Antão: Countryside & Songs, Capeverdean Creole: Santu Anton: Paisajen & Meludia]
- Cabo Verde na cretcheu [ALUPEK: Kabuberdi na kretxeu] - a theatrical film
- A Ilha dos Escravos (The Island of Slaves) (2008)
- A menina dos olho grandes (2010)
- Contract (2010)
- Picture the Leviathan (2012)
- Momento: Pupkulies & Rebecca Play Cabo Verde (2013)
- Another Land: Homage to John Ford (2013)
- Buska Santu (2016) - short film
- Coração Atlântico (Atlantic Heart) (2016) - dramatic feature film http://www.atlanticheart.com
- Hora do Bai (2017) - short film
- Sukuru (2017)
- The Volcano's Last Wish (2020) - short/feature directed by Guenny K. Pires

=== Documentaries ===
- Fogo, îl de feu (1979)
- Un carnaval dans le Sahel (1979)
- Morna Blues (1996) - directed by Anaïs Porsaïc and Éric Mulet
- Amílcar Cabral (2001) - a short documentary film
- The Music Cape (2004) - about the Baía das Gatas Music Festival
- The Journey of Cape Verde (2004) directed by Guenny K. Pires https://www.youtube.com/watch?v=R6-yKMs_Hdc
- Cape Verde Independence (2005) directed by Claire Andrade-Watkins
- Some Kind of Funny Porto Rican? : A Cape Verdean American Story (2006) directed by Claire Andrade-Watkins
- Arquitecto e a Cidade Velha [Architecture of Cidade Velha] (2007) - directed by Catarina Alves Costa
- Mindelo: Traz d'horizonte (2008) [Portuguese: Mindelo: Tras de horizonte]
- Cabo Verde Inside (2009) - an autobiographical documentary film
- Kontinuasom (2009) - [English: Kontinuasom, Portuguese: Kontinuasom]
- Carta d'Holanda (2010)
- Bitú (2010) — about a Mindelo native painter, filmed in 2006
- 2010 Mindelo Carnival (Carnaval de Mindelo 2010, actually as Carnaval do Mindelo 2010) - About the carnival in Mindelo of 2010
- Cabralista (Amílcar-Cabralian) (2011)
- Kolá San Jon (2011) about the festival of Saint John the Baptist (São João) - released in June
- Proud to Be Cape Verdean: A Look at Cape Verdeans in the Golden State (2012)
- Serenata de Amor (2013) directed by Claire Andrade-Watkins
- Shouting: Tierra (2013) - a documentary
- Tão longe é aqui (2013) [Capeverdean Creole: Tan longi é aki]
- Dona Tututa (2013) - documentary, directed by João Alves da Veiga
- Terra Terra (2014) directed by Paola Zerman — about the music and carnival of Cape Verde
- Working the Boats: Masters of the Craft (2016) directed by Claire Andrade-Watkins
- Firmeza (2018) directed by Paola Zerman, on hip hop of Mindelo
- Contract (2010) directed by Guenny K. Pires
- In Search of my Identity (2012) directed by Guenny K. Pires
- The Volcano's Last Wish (2020) directed by Guenny K. Pires
- The Prince of Fogo, feature for children, directed by Inge Tenvik.

== See also ==
- Media of Cape Verde
