= Vitalina =

Vitalina is a feminine given name that may refer to the following notable people:

- Vitalina Batsarashkina (born 1996), Russian sports shooter
- Vitalina Koval, LGBTI human rights defender in Ukraine
- Vitalina Simonova (born 1992), Russian breaststroke swimmer
- Vitalina Varela (born 1966), Cape Verdean actress
- Vitalina Bibliv (born 1980), Ukrainian actress
- Vitalina Naikore (born 2000), professional rugby union footballer
- Vita Nel (born 1975), South African olympic beach volleyballer
- Vita Sidorkina (born 1994), Russian model

== See also ==
- Vitalina Varela, a 2019 Portuguese film
