= Júlio Silvão Tavares =

Cape Verdean filmmaker

- Born: Júlio Silvão Tavares; 1959 (age 66–67); Cape Verde
- Occupations: Director, producer, screenwriter
- Years active: 1979–present

Júlio Silvão Tavares (born 1959), is a Cape Verdean filmmaker.

== Career ==
Since 1979, he studied Cape-verdean traditional culture, where he creates a Group of Experimental Theatre when he was the producer and director of the cultural Program 'Dragoeiro' broadcast on Televisão de Cabo Verde (TCV) from 1993 to 1997. From 1994 to 1996, Tavares was the director of the cultural program 'Articultura' telecast on Rádio de Cabo Verde (RCV). He is also the Director of the film production company called 'Silvão-Produção Filmes' which he founded in 2004.

Meanwhile, he produced the film O Desafio in 1999. In 2005, he made directorial debut with the critically acclaimed film Batuque, Alma de um Povo.about the batuque musical group Raiz di Tambarina, and roots of this musical genre in Santiago, Cape Verde. The film was screened in Lisbon in November 2010, and later screened at several international film festivals.

== Filmography ==
Year	Film	Role	Genre	Ref.
2006	Batuque, the Soul of a People	Director, writer	Documentary	
2018	Fahavalo, Madagascar 1947	Producer	Documentary	
