= Rajaonarivelo (surname) =

Rajaonarivelo is a surname. Notable people with the surname include:

- Herintsalama Rajaonarivelo, Malagasy politician
- Pierrot Rajaonarivelo (born 1946), Malagasy politician
- Raymond Rajaonarivelo (born 1949), Malagasy filmmaker
