= Vitalina Varela =

2019 film

- Directed by: Pedro Costa
- Written by: Pedro Costa; Vitalina Varela
- Produced by: Abel Ribeiro Chaves
- Starring: Vitalina Varela; Ventura
- Cinematography: Leonardo Simões
- Edited by: Vítor Carvalho; João Dias
- Release dates: 14 August 2019 (LFF); 21 February 2020 (United States)
- Running time: 124 minutes
- Country: Portugal
- Languages: Cape Verdean Creole; Portuguese
- Budget: €600,000
- Box office: $55,183

Vitalina Varela is a 2019 Portuguese drama directed by acclaimed director Pedro Costa. It won the Golden Leopard and Best Actress Award at the 2019 Locarno Film Festival. The film follows Vitalina Varela, a character who previously appeared in Pedro Costa's Horse Money.

It was selected as the Portuguese entry for Best International Feature Film at the 93rd Academy Awards after Portugal's first entry, Listen, was disqualified.

== Synopsis ==
Vitalina Varela follows its titular character, a Cape Verdean woman who arrives in Lisbon to meet her husband who's been gone for 40 years. As soon as she lands in the capital, she learns that he died three days ago. We follow Vitalina through the shanty town of Fontainhas as she navigates the traces that her husband left behind, discovering his secrets and his illicit life.

== Release ==
On August 14, 2019, the film had its world premiered at the Locarno Film Festival where it won the Golden Leopard and the Leopard for Best Actress. The film was then released around the world, through many film festivals. The film had its US premiere at the New York Film Festival on October 6, 2019. On January 24, 2020, it was shown at the Sundance Film Festival.

Vitalina Varela was theatrically released in the United States by Grasshopper Film on February 21, 2020, and on DVD and Blu-ray on September 8, 2020.

== Reception ==
=== Critical response ===
On the review aggregator Rotten Tomatoes, the film holds an approval rating of 98% based on 62 reviews, with an average rating of 8.6/10. The website's critical consensus reads, "Rigorous and beautifully composed, Vitalina Varela is a quietly absorbing drama whose placid surface belies hidden depths." Metacritic, which uses a weighted average, assigned the film a score of 86 out of 100, based on 15 critics, indicating "Universal acclaim".

Sight & Sound considered it the tenth best film of 2019, saying: "Varela’s performance is elemental, forged in fire. It never ceases to astonish just what miracles Costa is able to wrest from non-actors, or more accurately, coach them to wrest from themselves, but this is probably the most formidable performance, and the most potent screen presence, as yet in his work."

== See also ==
- List of submissions to the 93rd Academy Awards for Best International Feature Film
- List of Portuguese submissions for the Academy Award for Best International Feature Film
