= Cape Verdean Americans =

Americans of Cape Verdean birth or descent

Cape Verdean Americans Americanos cabo-verdianos
Total population
- 142,570 (2024)

Regions with significant populations
- New York, Massachusetts, Pennsylvania, New Jersey, Rhode Island, Connecticut, California, Washington, Florida, Georgia, Maryland, Delaware, Virginia and North Carolina

Languages
- English, Portuguese, Cape Verdean Creole (creole of Indo-European languages and Niger-Congo languages)

Religion
- Roman Catholic and Protestant

Related ethnic groups
- Portuguese Americans

Cape Verdean Americans are individuals with ancestry from Cape Verde born or residing in the United States.

== Immigration waves ==
Prior to independence in 1975, Cape Verdean immigrants were registered as Portuguese immigrants from the overseas province of Portuguese Cape Verde. Cape Verdean immigration to the United States began in the early 19th century. The first Cape Verdean immigrants came aboard New England whaling ships, which would often pick up crewmen off the coast of Cape Verde. The presence of Cape Verdeans in the New England whaling inspired the fictional character Daggoo in Herman Melville's 1851 novel Moby-Dick. Yankee captains in the packet trade valued Cape Verdeans as crew, because they "worked hard to save what they could while on board vessel they could be hired for much less money than American seamen. Furthermore, they made a disciplined crew." The Cape Verdeans were universally regarded as "hardworking, honest seamen." When all others abandoned the old sailing ships, the Cape Verdeans bought the decrepit vessels out of their earnings as seamen and kept patching them up with loving care. Eventually, they came to own almost all that remained of the New Bedford fleet, either by purchase or by default. In some cases, they received the ships as outright gifts and "sailed them all over the earth with their own crews and made a modest profit by whaling in the old and tried manner."

Following the abolition of slavery throughout the Portuguese Empire in 1869, the Cape Verde Islands suffered drought, starvation, and economic decline leading to a wave of mass emigration. Once on whaling ships and in America, Cape Verdean men were able to send home money and news of other family and friends already in "the land of opportunity." They also sent bidons (gasoline barrels) full of food, clothes, and other items from New Bedford, Massachusetts; and Providence, Rhode Island. The latter are the oldest and largest Cape Verdean communities in the United States. These communities and new Cape Verdean communities are marked by close kinship ties and interdependence among families, a traditional Cape Verdean practice that has been passed down through the generations.

One of the major forces that brought Cape Verdeans to the Americas was the whaling industry. American whalers from New Bedford first began travelling to the islands in the 1790s, and further developed their trade as time progressed into the 19th century. During this time, many Cape Verdeans joined American whaling crews in order to escape Cape Verde, a land plagued with poor natural resources and an often abusive Portuguese colonial government. By the mid-1800s New Bedford had transformed into an economic maritime center, where Cape Verdeans were not only about to excel in the whaling industry but in other maritime industries (such as fishing) as well. New Bedford Whaling Museum explains, "As the 20th century went on and the ties between the islands and the port strengthened, entrepreneurs like Roy Teixeira, Henrique Mendes, Louis Lopes, Frank Lopes and Antonio Cardoza purchased, managed and owned packet ships like the Coriolanus, the Savoia, and the Arcturus... Importantly, not only did Cape Verdeans settle in New Bedford, but between 1860 and 1965 41% of the packets trading between New England and the Islands were owned by Cape Verdeans."

Many Cape Verdeans worked in the cranberry bogs for the cranberry industry in Southeastern Massachusetts.

Cape Verdean migration to the United States in the 19th century and early 20th century was composed of the islands' poorer classes. In 1922, the U.S. government restricted the immigration of peoples of color, greatly reducing Cape Verdean immigration. The new regulations also prevented Cape Verdean Americans from visiting the islands for fear of being denied reentry to the United States. The two communities thus were relatively isolated from each other for approximately 40 years. With doors to America closed, Cape Verdeans began to immigrate in larger numbers to Europe, South America, and West Africa along routes charted by commercial shipping and the Portuguese colonial empire. During the same period some Cape Verdean Americans migrated from the long-established East Coast communities to the steel towns of Ohio and Pennsylvania; and to California.

In 1966, due to the Immigration and Nationality Act of 1965, the U.S. government relaxed its regulations, and a new wave of Cape Verdean immigration began. The new arrivals in Boston, Brockton, Taunton and Onset, Massachusetts; Pawtucket, Rhode Island; Waterbury, Connecticut; Brooklyn, and Yonkers, New York; and other communities on the East Coast met a Cape Verdean-American ethnic group whose members looked like them, but differed culturally. Separated for so long, the groups knew little of each other's recent history or treasured memories.

Full independence was achieved by Cape Verde on July 5, 1975 after a long struggle for complete rights and unrestricted control from the struggle of the country's colonial past. Though growing nationalism, prior efforts for independence slowly gained momentum and territory led by the efforts of the African Party for the Independence of Guinea and Cape Verde (PAIGC). This newfound independence allowed a new path that would be essential to the migration of Cape Verdean American as Cape Verde was one of few African countries allowing overflight of European and U.S. air travel. This was accompanied by two further actions of independence that aided Cape Verdean migration: broken political unity between Guinea-Bissau in 1980, and the election of António Mascarenhas Monteiro which brought economic struggles that incited emigration.

By 2010, the American Community Survey stated that there were 95,003 Americans living in the US with Cape Verdean ancestors which has since increased to 106,084 by 2023.

== Areas ==
The states with the largest population of Cape Verdeans (as of 2020) were:

=== U.S. states with the largest Cape Verdean-Americans populations ===
State/Territory	Cape-Verdean American Population (2024 estimate)	Percentage
Alabama	93	0.0%
Alaska	24	0.0%
Arizona	365	0.0%
Arkansas	19	0.0%
California	3,305	0.0%
Colorado	254	0.0%
Connecticut	4,794	0.1%
Delaware	69	0.0%
District of Columbia	136	0.0%
Florida	4,724	0.0%
(Georgia (U.S. state)) Georgia	1,406	0.0%
Hawaii	98	0.0%
Idaho	37	0.0%
Illinois	195	0.0%
Indiana	109	0.0%
Iowa	18	0.0%
Kansas	36	0.0%
Kentucky	84	0.0%
Louisiana	67	0.0%
Maine	302	0.0%
Maryland	835	0.0%
Massachusetts	90,118	1.3%
Michigan	162	0.0%
Minnesota	78	0.0%
Mississippi	36	0.0%
Missouri	89	0.0%
Montana	8	0.0%
Nebraska	23	0.0%
Nevada	327	0.0%
New Hampshire	497	0.0%
New Jersey	1,131	0.0%
New Mexico	39	0.0%
New York	1,556	0.0%
North Carolina	903	0.0%
North Dakota	15	0.0%
Ohio	411	0.0%
Oklahoma	102	0.0%
Oregon	117	0.0%
Pennsylvania	606	0.0%
Rhode Island	26,376	2.4%
South Carolina	319	0.0%
South Dakota	8	0.0%
Tennessee	163	0.0%
Texas	852	0.0%
Utah	125	0.0%
Vermont	102	0.0%
Virginia	1,060	0.0%
Washington	305	0.0%
West Virginia	15	0.0%
Wisconsin	46	0.0%
Wyoming	11	0.0%
US (2024)	142,570	0.0%

The largest communities of Cape Verdeans (as of 2010) were:

1. Brockton, Massachusetts (2023) – 16,753 or approximately 16% of the population.
2. Boston, Massachusetts – 13,605
3. New Bedford, Massachusetts – 9,613
4. Pawtucket, Rhode Island – 8,092
5. Providence, Rhode Island – 2,957
6. Taunton, Massachusetts – 2,391
7. Fall River, Massachusetts (2023) – 1,771
8. East Providence, Rhode Island – 1,717
9. Randolph, Massachusetts – 1,111
10. Central Falls, Rhode Island – 1,061
11. Barnstable, Massachusetts – 1,012
12. Cranston, Rhode Island – 924

Dorchester, Massachusetts, Brockton, Massachusetts, Taunton, Massachusetts, New Bedford, Massachusetts, Pawtucket, Rhode Island, and Onset, Massachusetts are the new immigrant communities of Cape Verdean Americans in the United States.

There are an estimated 265,000 Cape Verdean immigrants and their descendants living in the United States, according to a June 2007 article in The New York Times. Cape Verdean Americans reside mostly in Massachusetts and Rhode Island.

== Assimilation ==
Cape Verdeans suffered discrimination when they came to America. Cape Verdeans retained a unique culture apart from African Americans. This was especially true for those who settled outside the Cape Verdean communities concentrated in New England, and settled in the Midwest. Cape Verdeans maintained their own ethnic identity and lived in separate communities from African Americans. However, during the civil rights struggles of the 60s, Cape Verdeans saw similarities between their own struggle and that of African Americans and emerged a sense of solidarity with them. While some islands have a heavy European-descended population, most Cape Verdeans have African ancestry mixed with European and Sephardic Jewish heritage. Because later people from all over the world settled in Cape Verde, not only Europeans, the population is one of the most unusual ethnic melting pots in the world. Due to this uniqueness, most Cape Verdeans choose to cite "Cape Verdean" as their race, which not only reflects a strong sense of patriotism, but a sense of community that is found among Cape Verdeans regardless of skin tone.

For well over a century, the U.S. has hosted the largest proportion of the worldwide Cape Verdean diaspora residing in any individual nation.

One important consequence of the technological development in recent decades has been the emergence of Cape Verdean transnationalism on the Internet. Sónia Melo discusses how Cape Verdean websites have become important for linking diaspora communities with each other, for maintaining ties with Cape Verde, and for the local politics of emigrant communities in their countries of residence.

Additionally, some Cape Verdeans have a lighter skin color than Africans from the continent. This partially comes from the fact that in the beginning, Portuguese encouraged miscegenation between Portuguese colonizers and the members of African colonies throughout their empire (with the government often rewarding soldiers and officials with monetary or land benefits if they married indigenous people). Also, the prime location and solidarity found in the island allowed for interracial relationships to develop without traditional suppression. As a result, when it comes to hair textures, skin and eye colors there are a wide variety ranging from blue eyes and blonde hair on the islands of Fogo and Brava, to crisp and darker shades on the island of Santiago. Yet it is not uncommon for nuclear families to have a variety of tones and textures for members. The uniqueness of Cape Verdeans is reflected in the Massachusetts census permitting a "Cape-Verdean" check-box for ethnic identification.

== Languages ==
Generally, Cape Verdean Americans speak English, Portuguese, and Kriolu (or Crioulo). The Creole language is a mixture of Portuguese and the native African tongues spoken by slaves. In some Islands (mainly Fogo and Brava) there is a lot English vocabulary adopted. Although much of the vocabulary stems from Portuguese, many of these words were no longer used in twentieth-century Portugal. The African tongues, mostly Mande, influenced Kriolu chiefly. Since the Republic of Cape Verde became independent of Portugal in 1975, Kriolu has become the dominant language among the islanders.

The Cape Verdean Creole Institute was founded in Boston, Massachusetts, in 1996, to teach the Cape Verdean language. In addition, many schools in the Boston Public School district offer Cape Verdean Creole (CVC) as a language class. Currently 2.3% of the population of Boston speaks CVC.

Formal CVC language research in both Cape Verde and America has been ongoing since the late 1800s. The elite class of the island was mostly responsible for recording the earlier studies of the language in an attempt to make CVC more acceptable as an artistic language. When the first printing press came to Cape Verde in 1842, the elites began publishing written work in CVC for the first time. Additionally, the Seminary of São Nicolau was created in 1866, which allowed for the elite mixed race and the black elite to have access to education and begin a scholarly debate about CVC. These developments, along with other improvements in technology, allowed the study of CVC to flourish in Cape Verde.

In general, there are two different schools of thought on CVC research. One school of thought is Creole Exceptionalism, which regards creole languages as a socially inferior dialect or degenerate language. Another school of thought however is referred to as Crioulidade, which celebrates Cape Verde's unique heritage, consequently referring to the language not in terms of its African or Portuguese heritage, but rather as its own unique hybrid of the two that has its own history and cultural significance. Proponents of this school of thought argue that the processes of miscegenation and creolization were positive, rather than negative as the Exceptionalism school of thought suggests.

== Cuisine ==
Cachupa is a well-liked dish among Cape Verdean Americans. They often connect with their Portuguese heritage, and their culinary traditions are heavily shaped by Portuguese cooking. Common ingredients include Portuguese staples like pork, beef, various beans such as lima and kidney beans, cabbage, carrots, corn, eggs, onions, rice, and fish. Seasonings typical of Portuguese cuisine, including paprika, bay leaves, garlic, and onions, are also commonly used by Cape Verdean Americans. In the U.S., cachupa is referred to as manchup(a) and symbolizes home for Cape Verdean Americans.

== Religion ==
Due to a history of Portuguese colonization, the vast majority of Cape Verdeans and Cape Verdean Americans are Roman Catholic. Early Cape Verdean migrants to the United States originally joined Portuguese parishes that had sprung up throughout Southeastern Massachusetts. Cape Verdeans also began to establish their own masses in Criolu at many Massachusetts Catholic Churches. One such church is the St. Patrick's Church of Roxbury which has held a mass in Criolu for years. However, many Cape Verdean Catholics encountered racial prejudice amongst Portuguese parishioners and looked for religious alternatives. In New Bedford, the Cape Verdean community established the Our Lady of Assumption, the first Cape Verdean American church, in 1905 in response to such prejudice.

Furthermore, in spite of colonial ties to Catholicism and the Portuguese, many Cape Verdeans turned towards Protestantism in response to discrimination and a lack of support from the Archdiocese. In response to racism from the Portuguese community in Providence, the Cape Verdean community founded the Shelmer Street Church in 1905. Cape Verdeans in New Bedford at the turn of the 20th century were rejected by Portuguese parishioners at St. John's and turned towards Nazarene sects.

The mythic Daddy Grace also started his first church among a Cape Verdean community in Wareham, Massachusetts in response to rejection by Portuguese Catholics. In addition to Daddy Grace, who later founded a national religious movement, the United House of Prayer for All People, around his cult of personality, the Cape Verdean Protestant community has produced another religious leader of national acclaim, Reverend Peter J. Gomes. Today, a greater proportion of newly arrived Cape Verdean immigrants to the United States identify as Protestant due to an increased presence of evangelical missionaries in Cape Verde following its independence.

While Christianity is the dominant faith of Cape Verdeans in Cape Verde and the diaspora, there has been an interest in the Jewish ancestry of Cape Verdeans amongst Cape Verdean Americans. The Cape Verdean Jewish Heritage movement is mainly led by the diaspora and its interest is predominantly in preserving history, not practicing doctrine. Accordingly, one of the major goals of the movement is preservation of Jewish cemeteries in Cape Verde. A manifestation of this interest is the annual Cape Verdean - Jewish Passover Seder held in Roxbury, Massachusetts since 2005 The Seder brings together Cape Verdean and Jewish Americans in a celebration of both cultures. The traditional Seder is adapted with a bilingual Haggadah that includes Criolu prayers and elements of Cape Verdean history, such as the addition of Amilcar's Cup.

== Music ==
Cape Verdean music has evolved to be composed of diverse styles and genres that reflect its mixture of racial identities, such as: African, Portuguese, Caribbean and Brazilian influences. Older styles include morna and coladeira. These styles, though distinct, carry a commonality of somber, slow, and soulful tone that often reflects themes of love, longing, and nostalgia. Re-emerging forms of Caper Verdean Music are funaná and batuque. These quick tempo, percussion filled styles are high energy songs that are typically accompanied by hip-moving dance. These styles were banned previously due to overly sexual allegations but are now re-emerging in the past decade. Hip hop, Reggae and Zouk are styles of Cape Verdean music that are now being explored. These fusions with contemporary styles of music are often reflective in lyrics with ongoing themes of Cape Verdean life.

== Notable people ==
- Demetrius Andrade
- George Araujo
- Shauna Barbosa
- Anthony Barboza
- Cynthia Barboza
- Dana Barros
- Michael Beach
- Benzino
- Francisco L. Borges
- Gary Brito
- Blu Cantrell
- Evandro Carvalho
- Peter Cipriano
- Sonia Citron
- Stephen Cooper
- Jasiel Correia
- Mike Costa
- John DeBrito
- Pedro DeBrito
- Antonio Delgado (born 1977), first Lieutenant Governor of New York of African American or Latino descent
- Vinny deMacedo
- Paulo Dos Santos
- Wuilito Fernandes
- Tania Fernandes Anderson
- Wayne Fontes
- Gordon D. Fox
- Peter J. Gomes
- Ryan Gomes
- Paul Gonsalves
- Tony Gonzalez
- Charles Manuel "Sweet Daddy" Grace
- Lindsay Grace
- Marques Houtman
- Hakeem Jeffries
- George N. Leighton
- Dave Leitao
- Coi Leray (daughter of Benzino)
- Davey Lopes
- Maria Lopes
- Donaldo Macedo
- Masspike Miles
- Aeriél Miranda
- Dana Mohler-Faria
- Alexis Nikole Nelson
- Pebbles
- Paul Pena
- Glenn Pires
- Kali Reis
- Amber Rose
- Horace Silver
- Charles D. Smith
- David Soares
- Tavares Brothers
- Chelsea Tavares
- Kylee Russell
- José António Tavares dos Anjos
- Elle Varner
- Claire Andrade-Watkins
- Jeff Xavier
- Arif Zahir

== See also ==
- List of Cape Verdeans
- Famine in Cape Verde
- Cape Verdeans in the packet trade
- Whaling in New England
- Cape Verde–United States relations
