= Down to Earth (1995 film) =

Casa de Lava (Down to Earth)
- Directed by: Pedro Costa
- Written by: Pedro Costa
- Produced by: Paulo Branco
- Starring: Inês de Medeiros; Isaach De Bankolé; Édith Scob; Raul Andrade
- Cinematography: Emmanuel Machuel
- Edited by: Dominique Auvray
- Music by: Raul Andrade; Paul Hindemit
- Release date: 1995
- Running time: 110 minutes
- Country: Portugal
- Languages: Portuguese; Cape Verdean Creole

Down to Earth (Portuguese: Casa de Lava, lit. 'Lava House') is a 1995 Portuguese drama film directed by Pedro Costa. The film is set in Cape Verde Islands, a former Portuguese colony.

This drama film is characterized by its reduced narrative, and photographies of the volcano in the Cape Verde islands. The title literally means "a house of lava". The film has been described by some reviewers as Costa's remake of Jacques Tourneur's 1943 film, I Walked with a Zombie, and Costa himself has suggested that his original intention for Down to Earth was for it to be a remake of Tourneur's film. Costa's work has often been compared by some to modern updates of classical Hollywood films, with Jonathan Rosenbaum pointing out that Colossal Youth may be viewed as Costa's remake of John Ford's 1960 film Sergeant Rutledge.

Casa de Lava was screened in the Un Certain Regard section at 1994 Cannes Film Festival.

== Plot ==
The film tells a story of Mariana, a nurse who leaves Lisbon to accompany an immigrant worker in a comatose sleep on his trip home to Cape Verde. The devoted Portuguese nurse took a journey only to find herself lost in abstract drama. There she finds that "she brought a living man among the dead." Costa made the film in a densely minimalist style. Cryptic ellipses, cinematographic precision, narrative abstraction and lingering imagery of people and place, notably Mount Fogo, the highest active volcano of Cape Verde, are features in this melancholic meditation on love and loneliness.

== Cast ==
- Inês de Medeiros – Mariana (as Inês Medeiros)
- Isaach De Bankolé – Leão
- Édith Scob – Edite
- Pedro Hestnes – Edite's Son
- Isabel de Castro

== Influence of the making of the film in Costa's future career ==
In an interview with Jean-Pierre Gorin, Costa has stated that Casa de Lava was the gateway to making his films in Fontainhas. When he left Cape Verde after filming, many people gave him letters or presents to deliver to their friends and relatives back in Lisbon. Costa went to the shantytown of Fontainhas to deliver the letters and became enraptured with the environment, its smells and sensations (which he called spicy).
