= Maria Lopes =

American politician and activist from Rhode Island

Member of the Rhode Island House of Representatives from the 83rd District
- In office 1983–2001

Personal details
- Party: Democratic
- Occupation: Politician, activist

Maria J. Lopes is an American community activist and former politician who was the first African-American woman elected to the Rhode Island House of Representatives, serving from 1989 to 2001. A Cape Verdean American, she represented East Providence as a Democrat.

== Life and career ==
Of Cape Verdean descent, Lopes lived in the Wanskuck district of Providence, Rhode Island. Married to a firefighter, she became an activist after Mayor Joseph Doorley sought to sell the Valley View housing project, where she lived, to a private developer that planned to convert the property into luxury apartments. Lopes organized 400 residents and supporters to occupy the Providence City Council chambers in protest on May 29, 1973, and helped to coordinate a lawsuit that led to the Rhode Island Supreme Court halting the sale of the Valley View property. Doorley lost the 1974 election, and Lopes became active in the fair housing movement and the Tenant Affairs Board, which she served as vice chair and president.

Lopes was elected to a seat in the Rhode Island House of Representatives in November 1988 and took office in early 1983, representing the 83rd House District as a Democrat. She was the first Black woman elected to the Rhode Island General Assembly. In September 1983, Lopes reached an agreement with mayor Buddy Cianci to permit Valley View to be sold to a private developer but maintain 25% of the apartments as Section 8 housing.

Lopes lost her Democratic primary election in 2000 and left office in 2001.
