= Vitalina Varela (actress) =

Cape Verdean actress (born 1966)

- Born: 1966 (age 59–60)
- Occupation: Actress
- Notable work: Vitalina Varela
- Spouse: Joaquin Varela
- Children: 2

Vitalina Varela (born 1966) is a Cape Verdean actress.

== Biography ==
Varela was born in Cape Verde and married Joaquin Varela in the 1980s. They had two children, and he was a migrant laborer who periodically visited her. Joaquin died in 2013. Varela made her film debut with a small role in Pedro Costa's 2014 film Horse Money. She is a nonprofessional actress. After befriending Varela during the filming, and as he got to know her, Costa realized that she deserved her own movie.

In 2019, she starred as herself in Vitalina Varela, directed by Costa. Varela's character was married to a man and they were building a home, but he mysteriously disappeared. Nearly 40 years later, she leaves Cape Verde for Lisbon to find him, only to discover that he died the previous week and she missed the funeral. Her character visits his apartment in the slums. After a while, she meets the priest who presided at the funeral, whom she recognized from years before. Varela and the priest, played by Ventura, debate the nature of humanity and her husband, and she frequently delivers somber monologues directed at her husband's ghost.

The story is based on Varela's actual experiences, as she did actually come to Lisbon three days after her estranged husband's death. The Guardian's Peter Bradshaw praised her performance as displaying "a massively imperturbable dignity and limpid gaze." Joe Morgenstern of The Wall Street Journal writes that "Varela’s face is as expressive as a silent-film star." Varela received the Best Actress award at the Locarno Film Festival, while the film received the Golden Leopard prize for the best movie.

== Filmography ==
- 2014: Horse Money
- 2019: Vitalina Varela
