= Cabo Verde International Film Festival =

Film festival in Cape Verde

The Cabo Verde International Film Festival (CVIFF) is a film festival in Cape Verde first established in 2010.

As of September 2018, about 200 films have been screened at the festival. While CVIFF has received entries from other nations, most films screened are from the host country.

== Management ==
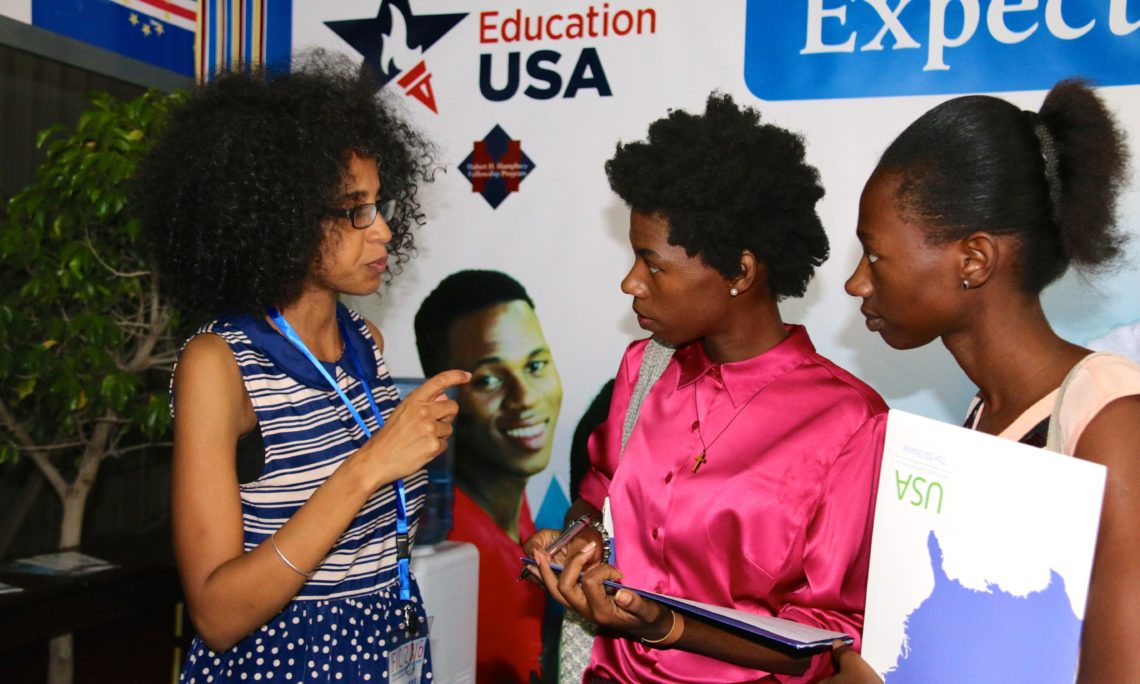
Suely Neves in 2016

CVIFF's executive producer is Suely Neves. A graduate of University of Massachusetts Amherst, she wrote her graduate thesis for SIT Graduate Institute on Cape Verde's deportation policies. She has been a project officer at the International Organization for Migration and 3x3 basketball coordinator.

== History ==
The film festival first premiered in October 2010 in Espargos, Sal. While originally conceived in 2008, the idea of a film festival was postponed due to the 2008 financial crisis. The first event had a total of five films screened which Neves has said was a positive start for the newly organized event. At the time, CVIFF was unable to secure sponsorships from businesses or cultural organizations, which would remain a problem for at least the next three years.

In 2014, it was reported that Hollywood filmmaker Mike Costa would be participating in that year's CVIFF as a panelist and jury member. The year prior the festival partnered with the African-American Film Critics Association to increase American presence there.
