= Laza Razanajatovo =

Malagasy filmmaker, film producer and film festival organiser

Laza (Laza Razanajatovo)
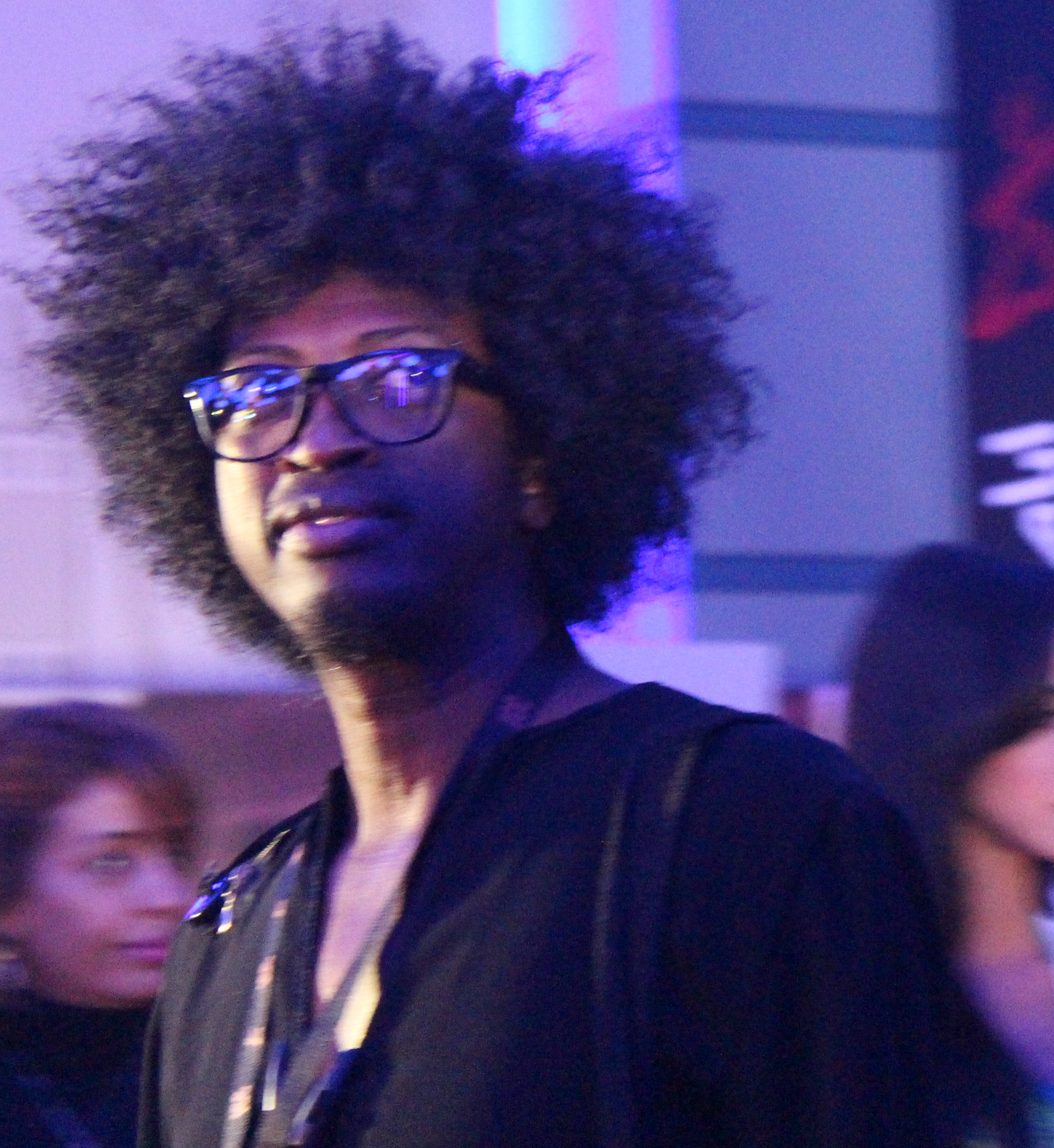
- Laza Razanajatovo at the Carthage Film Festival 2018
- Occupations: Film director, film producer, screenwriter, festival organiser, director of Rozifilms film production house.
- Notable work: Le Chant des Tlous (2012) with Luck Razanajaona, Fragments de vies (2012), and Tee-shirt man (2014) with Tovoniaina Rasoanaivo

Laza Razanajatovo (known as Laza) is a Malagasy filmmaker, film producer, screenwriter and film festival organiser of the Rencontres du Film Court Madagascar.

== Biography ==
In 2006 Laza founded the Rencontres du Film Court Madagascar, the short film festival of Madagascar, which has organised Pan-African short film competitions, workshops, meetings and international exchanges. He studied cinematography in Paris for eight years and is based in Antananarivo, Madagascar, as director of his own film production house Rozifilms. He was a member of the documentary jury at the 29th Carthage Film Festival (2018 Carthage Film Festival) and a co-organiser of Anim'ato Mada, a 2022 workshop for stop-motion film animators. Laza received the Chevalier (Knight) of the National Order of Madagascar distinction and is a president of Pan-African Alliance of Screenwriters and Directors (APASER).

== Filmography ==
Laza's films include:

Year	Film	Description	Role	Duration (minutes)
2001	Même instant de vie	Short	Director	
2004	La post-prod	Documentary for Malagasy television channels Ma-TV and TVM	Producer	
2008	6h58 (6:58 a.m.)	Fiction short	Director	12 m
2010	The pianoman	Fiction short	Producer	8 m
2010	Génération Jazz	Documentary	Producer	44 m
2010	L'Idiot du village	Fiction short	Screenwriter, director and producer	8 m
2012	Le Chant des Tlous by Luck Razanajaona	Historical fiction feature. A 1940 Malgasy rebel fighting the French is proposed a second life.	Producer	120 m
2012	Fragments de vies	Documentary feature on hospital patients and psychiatric music therapy	Screenwriter, director and producer	70 m
2014	Tee-shirt man by Tovoniaina Rasoanaivo	Documentary feature on a Malagy presidential election	Producer	70 m

== Publication ==
- Laza; Rajaonarivelo, Raymond (2016). Kolosary Cinéma Malagasy – Madagascar en 11 Films (in French and English). Madagascar: Institut Français, Paris, and Institut Français Madagascar, Antananarivo. Full-text book online at issuu.com.

== Gallery ==
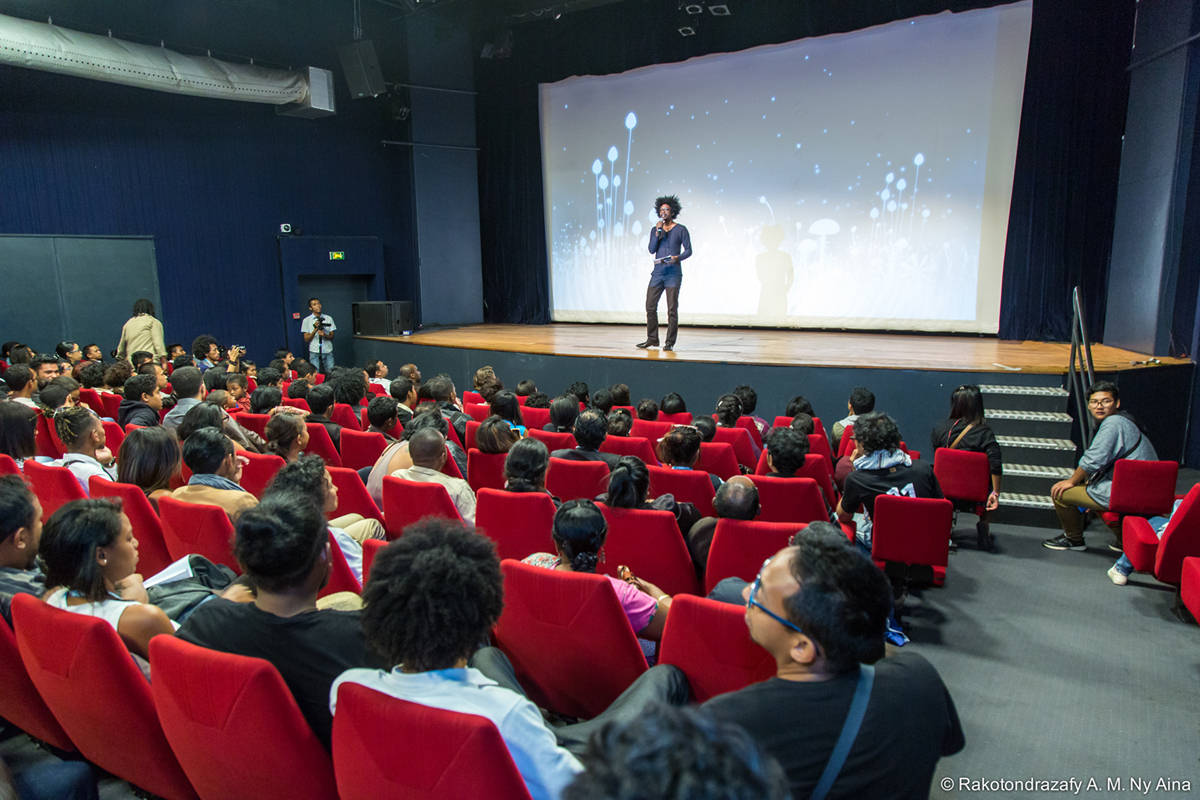
Laza addressing the public at the Rencontres du Film Court Madagascar competition screening, 2016.

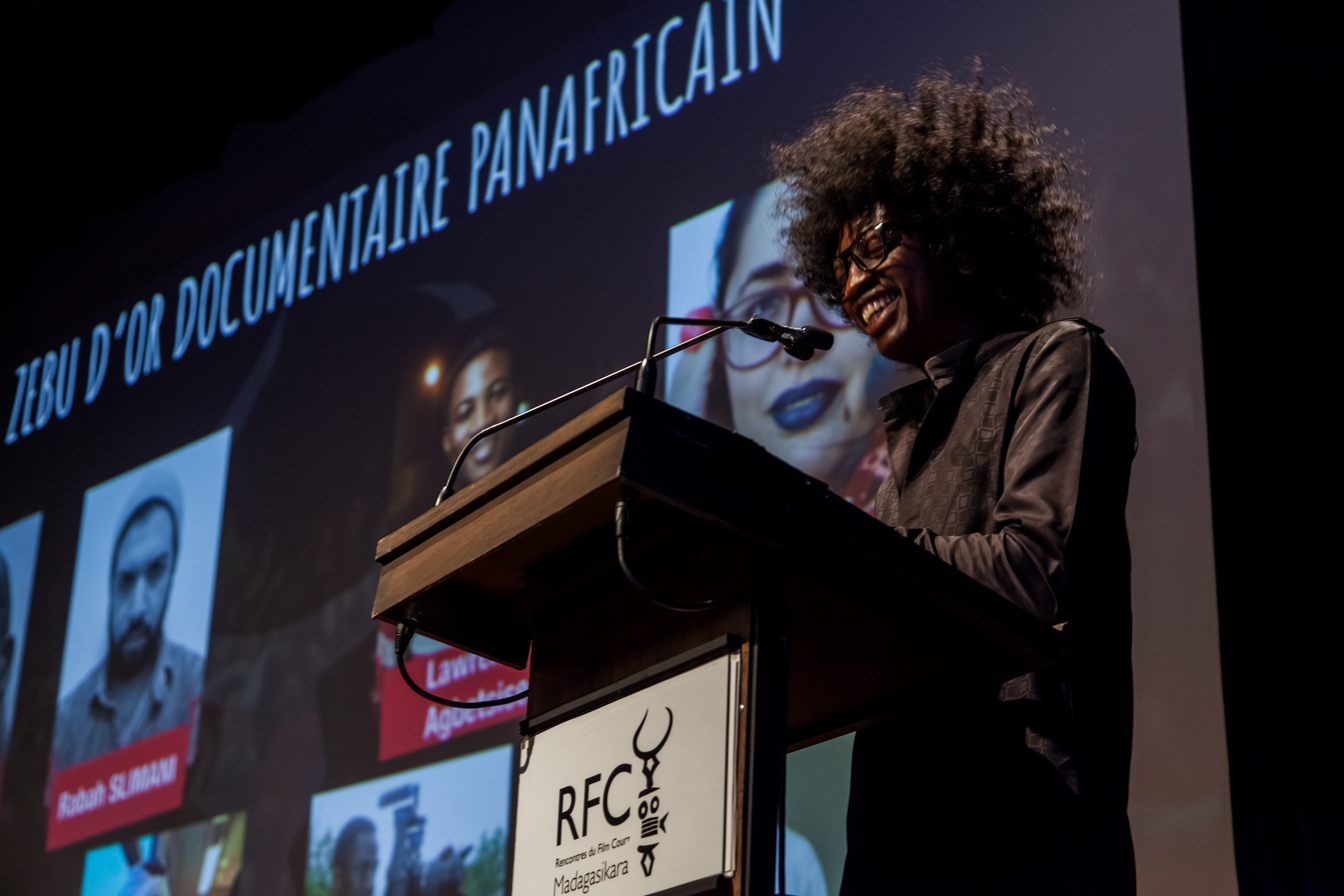
Opening speech of director Laza at the 13th Rencontres du Film Court Madagascar short film festival, 2018.
