= Angano... Angano... nouvelles de Madagascar =

1989 French documentary film

- Directed by: Marie-Clémence Paes, Cesar Paes
- Screenplay by: Marie-Clémence, Cesar Paes
- Produced by: Laterit Productions
- Cinematography: Cesar Paes
- Edited by: Cesar Paes
- Music by: Carson Rock Rangers, Jean & Marcel
- Release date: 1989
- Running time: 63 minutes
- Countries: France; Madagascar

Angano ... Angano ... nouvelles de Madagascar is a 1989 documentary film.

== Synopsis ==
A journey through the tales and legends of Madagascar, between reality and imagination, tinged with humor and tenderness that opts for the oral tradition to portray Malagasy culture. This documentary was chosen among the twenty most outstanding films in the Cinéma du Réel Festival.

== Awards ==
- Festival dei Popoli 1989
- Cinéma du Réel 1989
- Vues d'Afrique 1989
