= Fahavalo, Madagascar 1947 =

2018 Madagascar history war film

- Directed by: Marie-Clémence Paes
- Written by: Marie-Clémence Paes
- Produced by: Laterit Productions
- Cinematography: Cesar Paes
- Edited by: Paul Pirritano; Gabriel Paes
- Music by: Régis Gizavo
- Distributed by: Laterit Productions; Cobra Films; Doha Film Institute
- Release date: 1 September 2018
- Running time: 90 minutes
- Country: Madagascar
- Language: Malagasy

Fahavalo, Madagascar 1947, is a 2018 Malagasy historical war documentary film directed by Marie-Clémence Paes and produced by director herself with Agnès Contensou, Viviane Dahan for Laterit Productions, Cobra films and Silvão Produções respectively.

The documentary reveals the experience of 1947 fahavalo enemies against French colonial authorities in Madagascar with last living witnesses. The film received critical acclaim and won several awards at international film festivals including Documentaries of the world award at 42nd World Film festival and Special mention at Carthage Film Festival.
