= Raymond Rajaonarivelo =

Malagasy film director

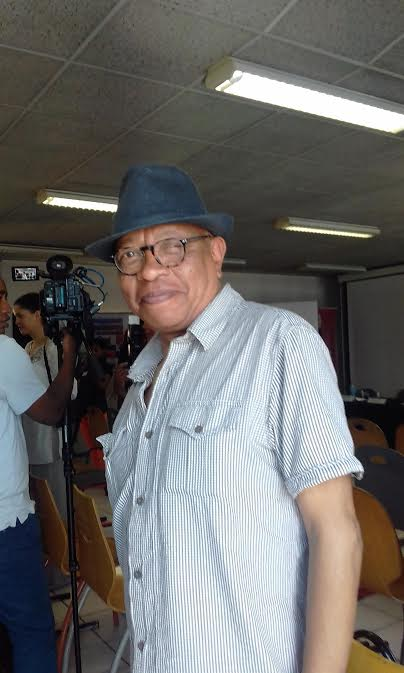
- Born: 1949 (age 76–77); Antananarivo, Madagascar
- Occupation: Film director

Raymond Rajaonarivelo (born 1949) is a Malagasy film director.

== Life ==
Raymond Rajaonarivelo was born in Antananarivo in 1949. He studied filmmaking at the University of Montpellier and at the University of Paris. Though living on the outskirts of Paris, he returns to Madagascar for filming.

In the 1970s Rajaonarivelo made two Malagasy short films. His debut feature film, Tabataba (1988), told the story of a village in the 1947 Malagasy Uprising. It was the first Malagasy film to be shown at the Cannes Film Festival, where it won the 1988 Audience Award. It also won the Jury award at the 1989 Taormina Film Fest, and first feature award at the 1989 Carthage Film Festival.

== Filmography ==
- Izaho Lokanga Ianao Valiha [I am 'Lokanga', you are 'Valiha'], 1974
- Tabataba [Rumour], 1988
- Quand les etoiles rencontrent la mer [When the Stars Meet the Sea], 1996
- (co-directed with Cesar Paes) Mahaleo, 2004
