= Rencontres du Film Court Madagasikara =

Annual film festival in Madagascar

Rencontres du Film Court Madagasikara / Madagascourt Film Festival
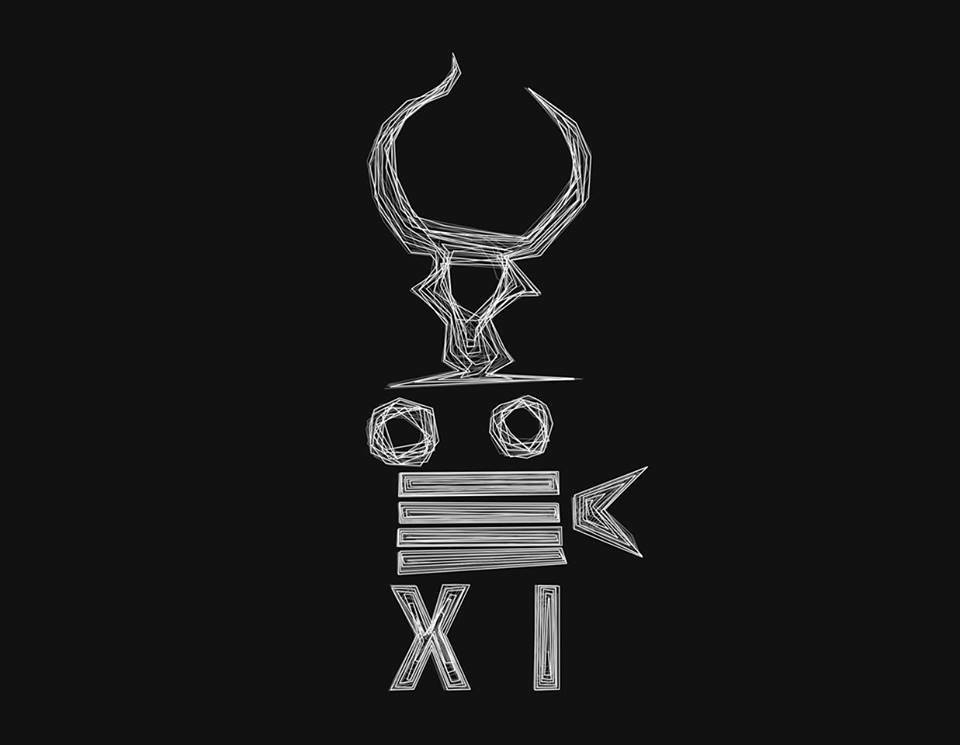
- Location: Antananarivo, Madagascar
- Founded: 2006
- Founded by: Laza Razanajatovo
- Awards: Zebu d'Or
- Festival date: 24 November-2 December 2023 (18th edition), 5-12 July 2024 (19th edition)
- Language: French
- Website: http://www.rencontresdufilmcourt.mg/

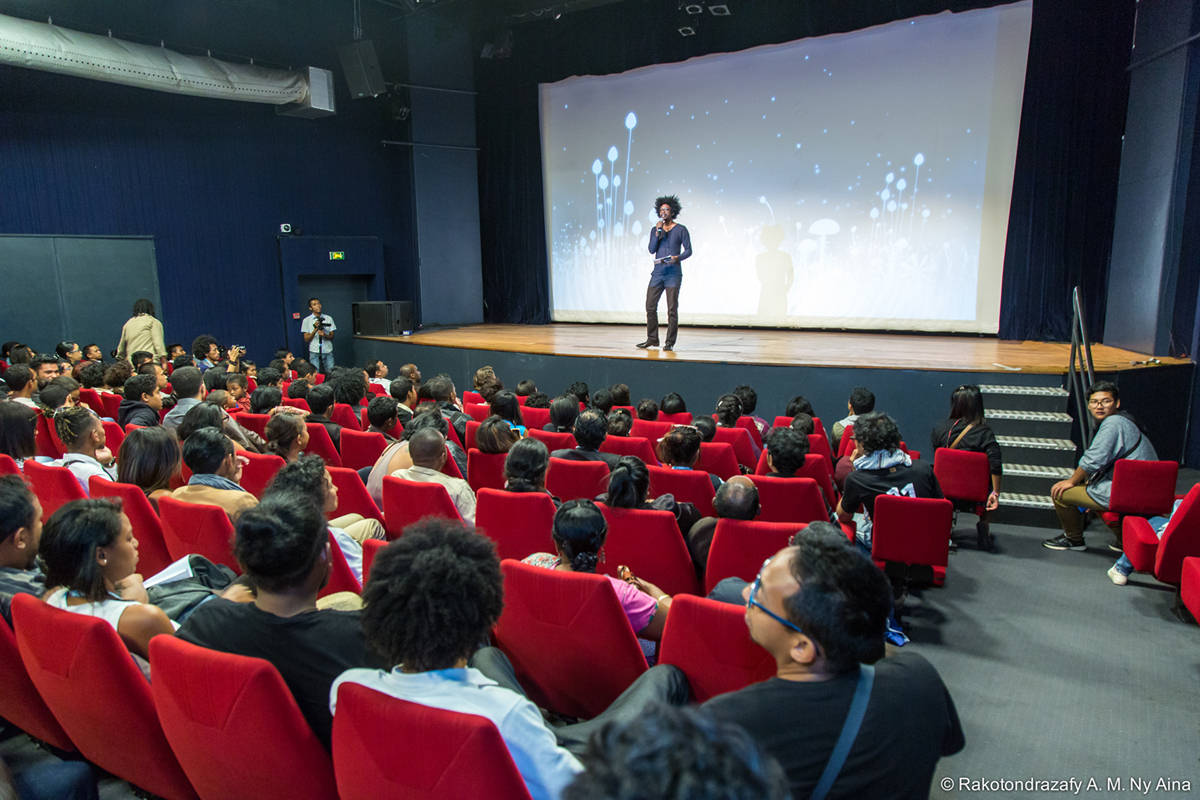
Laza welcomes the audience to a competition screening of RFC 11 at the Institut Français de Madagascar, 2016.

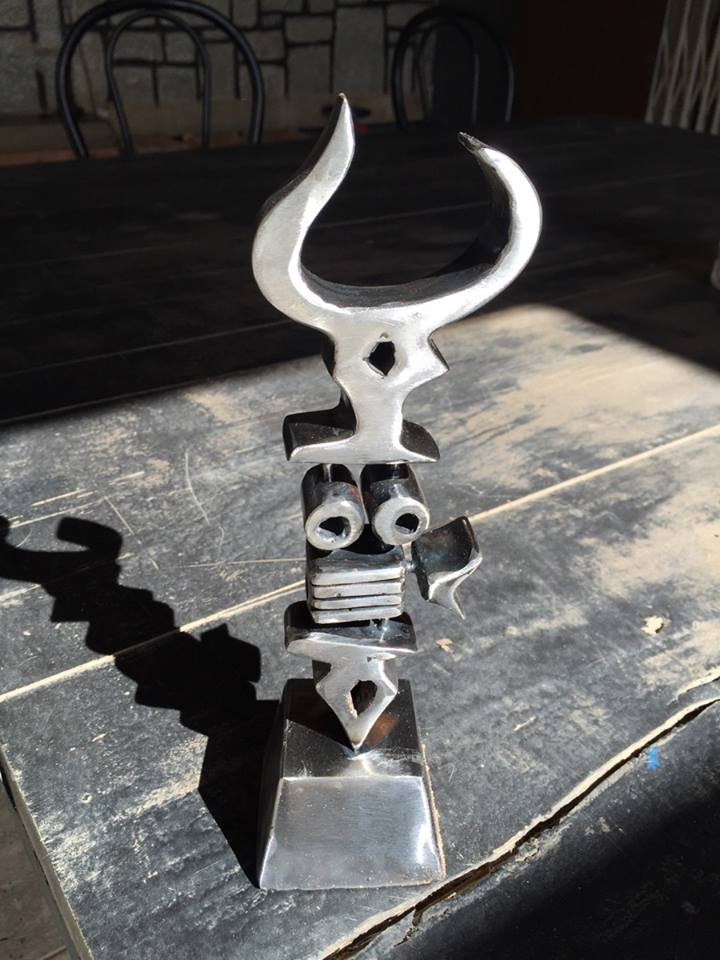
The Zebu d'or as awarded during RFC 10 (2015).

Rencontres du Film Court Madagasikara (Rencontres du Film Court (de) Madagascar (RFC), or Madagascourt Film Festival (MFF)) is the only film festival in Madagascar.

== History ==
The Festival was founded in 2006 by Laza, a Malagasy filmmaker and producer, and is organised by L'Association Rencontres du Film Court, the Institut Français de Madagascar, and Rozifilms. It is held annually in Antananarivo, the capital of Madagascar. Since 2017, RFC On Tour was added to share Malagasy films around Madagascar and to stimulate screenwriters, filmmakers, and producers. In 2013 the festival welcomed around 12,000 visitors. During the 13th edition of RFC in 2018 around 25,000 visitors have been counted.

== Scope and venues ==
The main focus of the festival is, apart from offering free film screenings to the public, to serve as an informal film school and to provide cinematographic expertise. Every year several meetings and workshops accompany the screenings. As there is no dedicated cinema in Madagascar, RFC's main screening venue is the building of the Institut Français de Madagascar (IFM) in Analakely, Antananarivo. Additional screenings are held in the open air or at IKMalagasy, the Centre Culturel Malagasy (Ivon-toeran'ny Kolontsaina Malagasy, IKM) at Antsahavola, Antana(narivo) and KUDéTA Urban Club, also Antananarivo.

== Festival programme ==
During 9 days around 350 films are presented in over 30 screenings at the festival in 2013. Beside many non-competition screenings, there are three official categories for competition:

- Compétition officielle Fiction, for Malagasy fiction short films,
- Compétition officielle Documentaire, for Malagasy documentary short films, and
- Compétition officielle Animation Panafricaine, for African animated short films.

== Awards ==
The Award of RFC is called Zebu d'Or (Golden Zebu). Awards are handed out to the winner of every competition category (fiction, documentary, animation). An additional fourth Zebu d'Or is awarded to the winner in the category "Choix du public" (Audience Award).
