= Raketa mena =

Raketa mena (Red Cactus)
- Directed by: Hery A. Rasolo
- Screenplay by: Hery A. Rasolo
- Produced by: Hery A. Rasolo alias IZANY S’IZANY
- Cinematography: Hery A. Rasolo
- Edited by: Hery A. Rasolo
- Music by: Hery A. Rasolo, Roak’Atsimo
- Release date: 2007
- Running time: 52 minutes
- Country: Madagascar

Raketa mena (transl. Red Cactus) is a 2007 documentary film.

== Synopsis ==
On the coast of Androy, the southernmost point of Madagascar, the weather conditions don't allow the fishermen to go fishing very often. The dunes build up, day by day, over fertile land. But that's not the worst. The population is missing the most important element, water. To calm their thirst and hunger, many villages eat "raketa mena", a cactus whose scientific name is Opuntia stricta. But this cactus is an invader that dries out the land. What is the solution?

== Awards ==
- Ciné Sud de Cozès 2007
