= In Vanda's Room =

- Directed by: Pedro Costa
- Written by: Pedro Costa
- Produced by: Karl Baumgartner; Andres Pfäffli; Francisco Villa-Lobos
- Starring: Vanda Duarte
- Cinematography: Pedro Costa
- Edited by: Dominique Auvray; Patricia Saramago
- Production companies: Contracosta; Pandora Film; RTSI; Ventura Film; ZDF
- Release date: 8 August 2000; (Locarno Film Festival)
- Running time: 171 min.
- Country: Portugal
- Languages: Portuguese, Cape Verdean Creole

In Vanda's Room (Portuguese: No Quarto da Vanda, 2000) is a docufiction (a subgenre of cinéma vérité) film by Portuguese director Pedro Costa. This is the second film in his Fontainhas trilogy.

== Overview ==
No Quarto da Vanda follows the drama film Ossos (1997) in which Vanda Duarte plays as an actress.

The film follows the daily life of Vanda Duarte, a heroin addict, in the Fontainhas district, a shanty town on the outskirts of Lisbon. The film's focus is also on the community of the district and its townscape. The film took a year to shoot after the (initially) one-person crew settled in the location, where Vanda and the community including Cape Verdean immigrants lived difficult lives.

In spite of its three-hour length, the director Pedro Costa made the film in a realist style by using fixed shots entirely. The dispiriting life of the community was shot on digital video in a low-key way. Costa said about his impression of the district in a conversation with Jean-Pierre Gorin

When I entered the Fontainhas area, there were colors and smells that made me remember the things and events of the past, and also ideas about people to which I am attracted. These ideas nestled close to each other, living together even as they led very solitary lives because of violent and painful separation. A form of interesting and incompatible relationships existed in this.

The film also sees the Fontainhas district slowly being demolished. The displaced inhabitants are featured in Costa's next film Juventude em Marcha (Colossal Youth, 2006).

The Criterion Collection described the film as "burrow[ing] even deeper into the Lisbon ghetto and the lives of its desperate inhabitants... with the intimate feel of a documentary and the texture of a Vermeer painting" and praised its "unflinching, fragmentary look at a handful of self-destructive, marginalized people".

== Cast ==
- Vanda Duarte as Self
- Lena Duarte as Self
- Zita Duarte as Self
- Pedro Lanban
- António 'Pango' Semedo
- Paulo Nunes
- Paulo Jorge Gonçalves
- Manuel Gomes Miranda
- Evangelina Nelas
- Fernando Paixão
- Diogo Miranda

== Credits ==
- Director: Pedro Costa
- Producer: Karl Baumgartner
- Producer: Andres Pfäffli / Elda Guidinetti
- Producer: Francisco Villa-Lobos
- Cinematography: Pedro Costa
- Editing: Dominique Auvray
- Sound: Philippe Morel
- Sound: Mathieu Imbert
- Sound: Stephan Konken

== Reception ==
On the review aggregator website Rotten Tomatoes, 100% of 5 critics' reviews are positive.

=== Accolades ===
Despite its highly fictional nature, its elusive classification and its documentary-like hybridization allowed it to win the FIPRESCI Prize at the Yamagata International Documentary Film Festival in 2001 "for presenting life in its near-original form".

Pedro Costa collected the France Culture Award (Foreign Cineaste of the Year) for directing the film at 2002 Cannes Film Festival.

== Home video ==
This film, together with Ossos (1997) and Colossal Youth (2006), is released by the Criterion Collection in a box set Letters from Fontainhas: Three Films by Pedro Costa.

== See also ==
- Ossos
- Juventude em Marcha
- Docufiction
- List of docufiction films
- Ethnofiction
- Cinéma vérité
