= Claire Andrade-Watkins =

Cape Verdean–American historian and filmmaker

- Born: Claire Andrade-Watkins
- Education: Simmons College; Boston University
- Occupations: Historian, filmmaker, producer, writer, author, actress
- Years active: 1990–present

Claire Andrade-Watkins, is a Cape Verdean–American historian and filmmaker. She is an interdisciplinary scholar of African and African American history with a focus on Cape Verdean American history, as well as Post-colonial French. Meanwhile, she excels in Portuguese-speaking African cinema, cinemas of the Africana diaspora, and Black American film and its filmmakers.

== Personal life ==
She attended Lincoln School Providence, obtained her B.A. degree from Simmons College and later obtained M.A. and Ph.D. from Boston University.

== Career ==
Andrade-Watkins is the founding Director of the 'Fox Point Cape Verdean' Project, a community-based research initiative created in 2007. She also holds the President of production and distribution company, 'SPIA Media Productions, Inc.'. It was founded in 1998 and specialized in media from the African Diaspora.

She is the first academic tenure track professor of color in the college, and the first Full Professor of color in Visual and Media Arts before migrating to the Institute for Liberal Arts & Interdisciplinary Studies. She is also the author of several books including, Society for Visual Anthropology, Research in African Literature, The Independent Film and Video Monthly, American Historical Review, and CinémAction.

== Filmography ==
Year	Film	Role	Genre	Ref.
2005	Cape Verde Independence	Director, producer	Documentary	
2006	Some Kind of Funny Porto Rican? : A Cape Verdean American Story	Director, executive producer, writer, editor	Documentary	
2011	Hi, Neighbor	Director, producer, writer	Video documentary short	
2013	Serenata de Amor	Director, producer	Documentary	
2016	Working the Boats: Masters of the Craft	Director, producer	Documentary	

== Awards and honors ==
She has awarded and honored with several organizations and film festivals.

- Fellowship in Film & Video, 2017 – RISCA (Rhode Island State Council on the Arts), Fellowship in Film & Video, Working the Boats: Masters of the Craft
- Fulbright Research Award 1996 – Republic of Cape Verde, Indigenous Cinema
- American Philosophical Society Research Award 1997 – Republic of Cape Verde, Indigenous Cinema
- Official selection, Hot Docs Canadian International Documentary Festival, Redux category 2020 – Cape Verde Independence
- Official selection, FESTin - Festival de Cinema Itinerante da Língua Portuguesa Lisbon, Portugal 2014 – Cape Verde Independence
- Black Maria Film Festival, Jury's Choice (first prize) – 2012 Hi, Neighbor (Ola Vizinho)

== See also ==
- Cinema of Cape Verde
