= César Paes =

Franco-Brazilian filmmaker

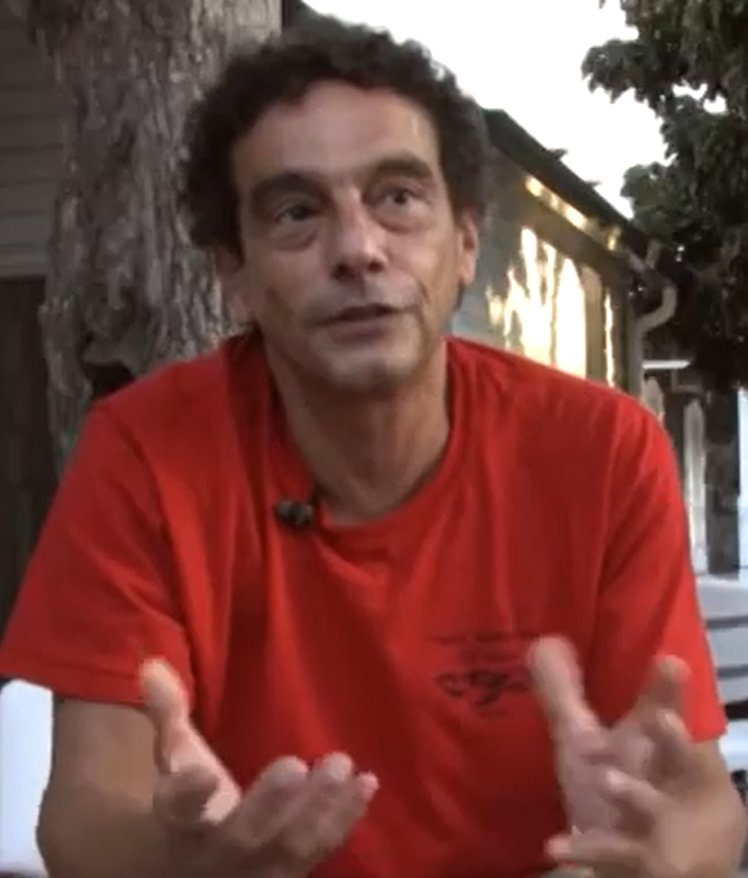
- Born: 1955 (age 70–71); Campos, Brazil
- Occupations: Director, producer, writer
- Years active: 1988–present
- Spouse: Marie-Clémence Andriamonta

César Paes (born 1959), is a Brazilian French filmmaker. He has directed several critically acclaimed feature documentaries including: Angano... Angano..., Mahaleo and L'opéra du bout du monde. Apart from direction, he is also a producer, writer and cinematographer.

== Personal life ==
César Paes was born in 1955 in Campos, Rio de Janeiro, Brazil.

He is married to Marie-Clémence Andriamonta, who is also a Franco-Malagasy director.

== Career ==
In 1988, he launched an independent production company based in Paris called Laterit Productions together with his wife Marie. The production company is committed in distribution and publishing. With his wife Marie, he directed documentaries such as Angano...Angano... Tales from Madagascar, To the warriors of silence, Saudade do Futuro and Songs for Madagascar won several top awards at Cinéma du Réel, Festival dei Popoli and Dok Leipzig.

In 2012, he co-directed the documentary L'Opéra du bout du monde which is the story of the creation of a contemporary opera from Reunion Island recounting the arrival of Louis XIV's officers in the islands of the Indian Ocean.

== Filmography ==
Year	Film	Role	Genre	Ref.
1989	Angano... Angano... nouvelles de Madagascar	director, writer	Documentary	
1992	To The Warriors of Silence	cinematographer	Documentary	
1992	Songs and Tears of Nature	director, writer	Documentary	
1996	Awara Soup	director, cinematographer	Documentary	
1997	We, France's Undocumented Immigrants	director	short film	
2000	Saudade Do Futuro	director, producer, cinematographer	Documentary	
2005	Mahaleo	director, cinematographer	Documentary	
2005	Making Sometimes in April	cinematographer	TV Short documentary	
2005	Le sifflet	cinematographer	Short film	
2006	Batuque, l'âme d'un peuple	cinematographer, writer, art director	Documentary	
2012	L'opéra du bout du monde	director, producer	Documentary	
2016	Songs for Madagascar	director, cinematographer	Documentary	
2018	A Long Hot Summer in Palestine	writer	Documentary	
2019	Fahavalo, Madagascar 1947	cinematographer	Documentary	
