= Samira Vera-Cruz =

Cape Verdean film director, producer, editor and actress

- Born: Samira Nandi Marques Vera-Cruz Pinto; 11 September 1990 (age 36); Mindelo, São Vicente, Cape Verde
- Education: American University of Paris
- Occupation: Film director
- Years active: 2016-present

Samira Nandi Marques Vera-Cruz (born 11 September 1990) is a Cape Verdean film director, producer, editor and actress.

== Biography ==
Born in São Vicente, Samira Vera-Cruz is a Cape-Verdean film director, producer, underwater cinematographer and divemaster, with Angolan and Cape Verdean ancestry. She grew up between the cities of Mindelo, Praia and Lisbon, the latter in Portugal.

Samira graduated with a bachelor of arts in Film Studies and a minor in Global Communications at the American University of Paris in 2013.

Director of the short film Buska Santu (2016) and the short documentary Hora di Bai (2017).

Buska Santu is a short fiction film, inspired by "The Bicycle Thief" by Vittorio de Sica, and shows us the relationship between a father and his son, in the island of Santiago, Cabo Verde. The short film has been screened in Cabo Verde, Portugal, Poland and Mozambique and won the prize for best fiction at the Oiá Film Festival in Mindelo, Cabo Verde.

She then created her production company, Parallax Produções, and with it directed the films Hora di Bai (2017) and Sukuru (2017).

Hora di Bai is a short documentary, financed by the European Union, through the "Short Films PALOP-TL UE 25 years" contest, and talks about the relationship with death in the island of Santiago, Cabo Verde. The film has been screened in festivals in Cabo Verde, Brazil, Canada, United States of America, Portugal, Belgium, Poland, Guinea Bissau, Mozambique, Angola, São Tomé and Principe, Macau, East Timor and Madagascar.

The director was selected for Talents Durban 2019, during the Durban International Film Festival, in which she participated with her documentary project "And Who Will Cook?", and received the PR Consulting Award at the end of the residency.

That same year, she participated in FIDADOC's writing residency, in Morocco.

In 2020, the director participated in Durban FilmMart and Ouaga Film Lab with the documentary project "And Who Will Cook?". At the later she won the IDFA and World Cinema Fund/Goethe Institute Awards.

Samira is a founding member of the PALOP-TL Film and Audiovisual Network, founded with fellow filmmakers from Cape Verde, Mozambique, Angola, Guinea Bissau and São Tomé and Príncipe, with the aim of promoting production and especially distribution in the region.

Samira's most recent short documentary, Sumara Maré (2023), was selected for the NEWF Producers’ Lab 2022 — an initiative by Africa Refocused (a collaboration between NEWF and the National Geographic Society), and was financed by NEWF and UNDP’s Accelerator Lab.

She also directed the short film Savannah Girl as part of the African Science Film Fellowship. During the same program, Samira joined an all-female crew to co-direct Guano Gold, an episode of the American series Wild Hope by HHMI Tangled Bank Studios, now airing on PBS.

The short film was screened in over 20 countries and received awards internationally.

== Filmography ==
- Busku Santu [Busca Santu] (2016)
- Hora di Bai [Time to Go] (2017)
- Sukuru [Darkness] (2017)
- Sumara Maré [Observing the tides] (2023)
- Savannah Girl (2024)
