= Marie-Clémence Paes =

Franco-Malagasy filmmaker

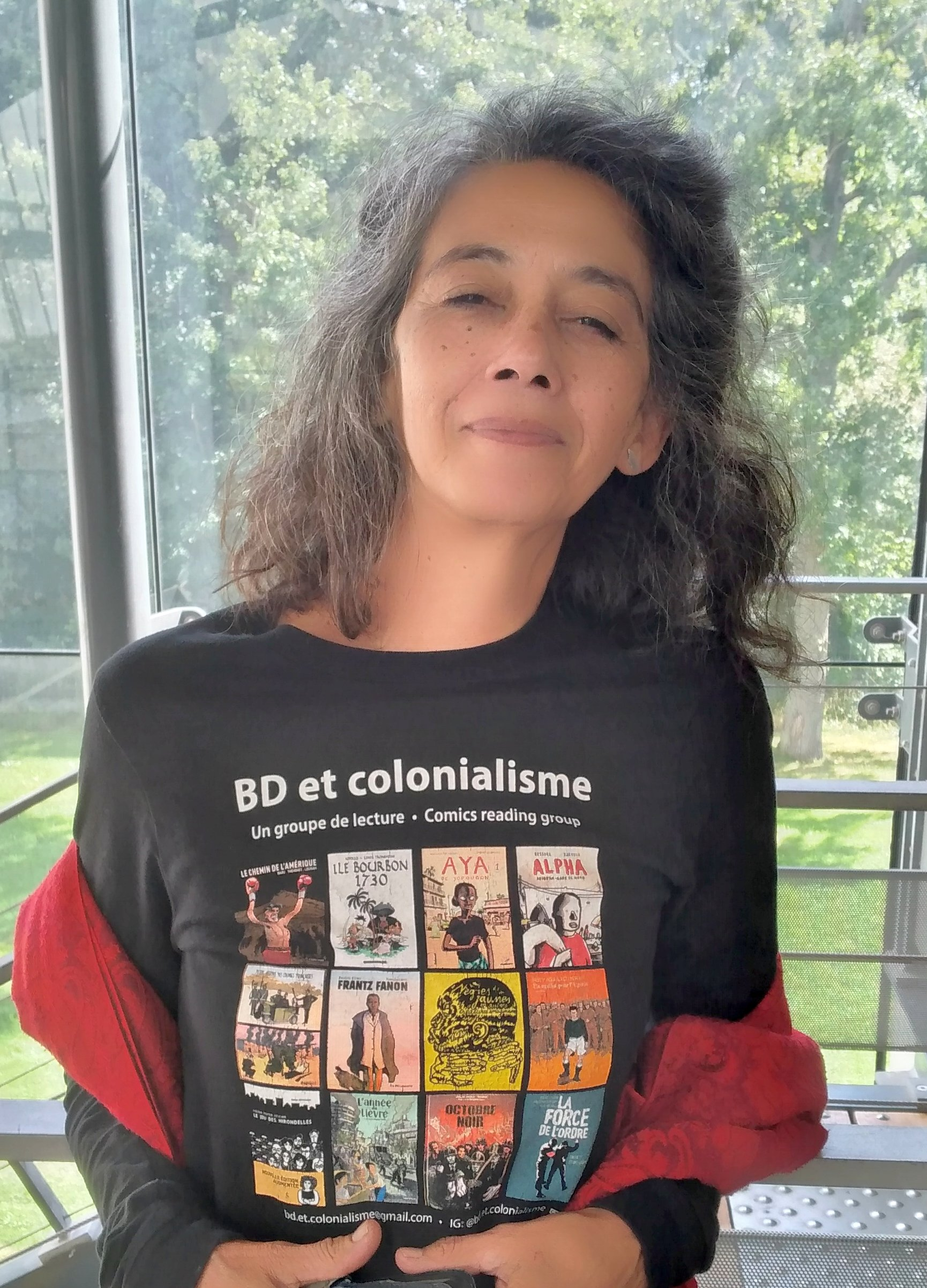
- Born: Marie-Clémence Andriamonta; 1959 (age 66–67); Madagascar
- Occupations: Director, producer, writer
- Years active: 1988–present
- Spouse: César Paes

Marie-Clémence Andriamonta Paes (born 1959), is a Malagasy French filmmaker. She has produced several critically acclaimed feature documentaries including: Angano... Angano..., Mahaleo and L'opéra du bout du monde. Apart from direction, she is also a producer and writer.

== Personal life ==
She was born in 1959 to a French father and Malagasy mother. She completed a master's degree in sociology and a Marketing CELSA-Sorbonne Diploma.

She is married to César Paes, who is also a Franco-Brazilian director.

== Career ==
In 1988, she launched an independent production company based in Paris called 'Laterit Productions' together with her husband César. The production company is committed in distribution and publishing. With her husband César Paes, she wrote and produced documentaries such as Angano...Angano... Tales from Madagascar, Songs and Tears of Nature, and Awara Soup. Awara Soup won several top awards at Cinéma du Réel, Festival dei Popoli and Dok Leipzig. Her films such as Saudade do Futuro, Mahaleo, An Opera from the Indian Ocean and Songs for Madagascar were theatrically released in France and in the US as well. In her documentaries, music is an important aspect and music is often used as a narrative element. Many of the films directed by Clémence won several prizes at the Cinéma du Réel festival.

Her film Angano...Angano... Tales from Madagascar won the first prize at the 30th Festival dei Popoli in Florence in 1989. In 2000, documentary Saudade do futuro won the Audience award at the Rencontres internationales de Cinéma. In 2004, she co-produced the documentary Mahaleo along with ARTE Cinema with the participation of Canal +. She also worked as the producer in her husband's films such as To the warriors of silence (1992), Saudade do Futuro (2000) and Songs for Madagascar (2016). In 2007, the documentary Mahaleo won a SCAM Star.

In 2012, she co-directed the documentary L'Opéra du bout du monde which is the story of the creation of a contemporary opera from Reunion Island recounting the arrival of Louis XIV's officers in the islands of the Indian Ocean. In 2019, she directed a feature film, Fahavalo, centers on the remaining memory of the Madagascan insurrection of 1947.

== Filmography ==
| Year | Film | Role | Genre | Ref. |
|---|---|---|---|---|
| 1989 | Angano... Angano... nouvelles de Madagascar | director, producer, writer | Documentary | |
| 1992 | To the warriors of silence | producer | Documentary | |
| 1992 | Songs and Tears of Nature | producer, writer | Documentary | |
| 2000 | Saudade Do Futuro | producer, writer | Documentary | |
| 2005 | Mahaleo | producer | Documentary | |
| 2005 | Le sifflet | producer | Short film | |
| 2006 | Batuque, l'âme d'un peuple | director, producer, production manager | Documentary | |
| 2012 | L'opéra du bout du monde | director, executive producer, writer | Documentary | |
| 2014 | The Malagasy Way | co-producer | Documentary | |
| 2016 | Songs for Madagascar | producer | Documentary | |
| 2016 | De la Sakay à la Carapa | producer | Documentary | |
| 2018 | Fahavalo, Madagascar 1947 | director, producer, writer | Documentary | |
