= Tabataba (film) =

- Directed by: Raymond Rajaonarivelo
- Written by: Robert Archer; Raymond Rajaonarivelo; Jérôme Tonnerre
- Produced by: Jacques Le Glou
- Starring: Philippe Nahoun; François Botozandry; Lucien Dadakisy; Soatody; Soavelo; Rasoa
- Cinematography: Gilles Arnaud; Véronique Patte; Bruno Privat
- Music by: François Botozandry; Lucien Dakadisy; Saotody... [et al.]
- Production companies: Centre National de la Cinématographie (CNC); La Secae; La Sept Cinéma; Les Films du Volcan; Minazara Productions
- Release date: May 19, 1988; at the Cannes Film Festival
- Running time: 128 min.
- Countries: Madagascar; France
- Languages: French; Malagasy

Tabataba is a 1988 film directed by Raymond Rajaonarivelo.

== Synopsis ==
Tabataba tells the story of a small Malagasy village during the independence uprising which took place in 1947 in the south of the country. For several months, part of the Malagasy population revolted against the French colonial army in a bloody struggle. The repression in villages that followed was terrible, leading to fires, arrests and torture. Women, children and the elderly were the indirect victims of the conflict and suffered particularly from famine and illness. One leader of the MDRM, the party campaigning for independence, arrives in a village. Solo (François Botozandry), the main character, is still too young to fight but he sees his brother and most of the men in his clan join up. His grandmother, Bakanga (Soavelo), knows what will happen, but Solo still hopes his elder brother will return a hero. After months of rumours, he sees instead the French army arrive to crush the rebellion.

== Awards ==
- Prix du public, Quinzaine des rèalisateurs, Festival de Cannes, 1988
- Prix du jury, Taormina Film Fest, 1988
- Prix de la première oeuvre, Carthage Film Festival, 1989
