= Ossos =

- Directed by: Pedro Costa
- Written by: Pedro Costa
- Produced by: Paulo Branco
- Starring: Vanda Duarte; Nuno Vaz; Mariya Lipkina; Isabel Ruth; Inês de Medeiros
- Cinematography: Emmanuel Machuel
- Edited by: Jackie Bastide
- Production company: Madragoa Filmes
- Release date: 2 September 1997 (Venice Film Festival)
- Running time: 98 minutes
- Country: Portugal
- Language: Portuguese

Ossos (English: Bones) is a 1997 Portuguese film directed by Pedro Costa.

Ossos was shot in the Fontainhas district of Lisbon (also known as "Estrela d'Africa"), where disadvantaged dwellers and immigrants from former Portuguese colonies in Africa live desperate lives. The film was nominated for the Golden Lion and won for Best Cinematography (Golden Osella) at the Venice International Film Festival in 1997.

Costa further dealt with the now-defunct shanty district in his next two films, In Vanda's Room (2000) and Colossal Youth (2006).

== Plot ==
Tina is a young mother who has given birth to a newborn baby. She stays in a shanty apartment within the Fontainhas district with her unnamed deadbeat live-in partner. Her sister Clotilde, who works as a housemaid, stays at a nearby apartment with her daughter, Mauda. One afternoon, the father searches for food at a local market and takes meals from a local diner. At nighttime, the father wanders alone on the street, while Tina is feeling suicidal. She places a decompressed gas cylinder beside her and the baby. The father returns home, and Tina drags him into a nearby room to be near her and the baby. Meanwhile, Clotilde stares silently in her apartment.

The next morning, Tina leaves the child in the care of the father. Having not eaten in three days, he asks for food from locals on the street, while holding his child. A woman (later known as Eduarda) feeds the father and the baby a sandwich and milk from a nearby deli. Shortly after, the baby is taken to a hospital for immediate care. He goes outside and sits on a bench. He is approached by a nurse, who recommends her colleague, Eduarda. At nightfall, he returns to the hospital where Eduarda informs him the baby is quite ill. He goes outside to smoke, where Eduarda tells him a pediatrician is arriving the next day to run medical tests on the child. The father goes to Eduarda's apartment, where she feeds him a meal.

The next morning, Tina stays over at Clotilde's apartment. Back at Eduarda's apartment, she asks the father about Tina; he responds Tina does not care about being a mother. Eduarda takes the child to her apartment and becomes its new caregiver. Meanwhile, Clotilde looks after Tina. The father returns and briefly converses with Clotilde. The father is given custody of his child again.

Later on, Eduarda hires Clotilde as a housemaid five days a week. That same night, Tina searches for Clotilde but she is approached by her husband. Clotilde returns, stating she now works for Eduarda. Sometime later, Tina arrives at Eduarda's apartment, but finds no one is there. Instead, she finds a list of cleaning instructions Eduarda had written for Clotilde. Hours later, Eduarda returns from work where she finds Tina lying unconscious in the kitchen from another suicide attempt. Tina recovers, and Eduarda offers to have Tina stay with her. Simultaneously, the father stays with a prostitute, who offers to care for the child.

Eduarda comes to Tina's apartment where she finds her alone. They bond while smoking cigarettes. Clotilde returns to clean Eduarda's apartment. She returns home, and she and Tina have a moment together at Tina's apartment. Clotilde leaves and Tina shuts her door.

== Cast ==
- Vanda Duarte as Clotilde
- Nuno Vaz as The Father
- Maria Lipkina as Tina
- Isabel Ruth as Eduarda
- Inês Medeiros as Whore
- Miguel Sermão as Clotilde's husband
- Berta Susana Teixeira as Nurse

== Credits ==
- Director: Pedro Costa
- Writer: Pedro Costa
- Producer: Paolo Branco
- Cinematography: Emmanuel Machuel
- Costume design: Isabel Favila
- Production design: Zé Branco
- Sound: Henri Maikoff
- Sound: Gérard Rousseau
- Editing: Jackie Bastide

== Reception ==
In a retrospective article on Costa's work, HuffPost praised the film's long takes as "remarkable in their passive beauty", as well as telling a story without dialogue while "creating a sense of foreboding and at times a sleepy sexual tension."

== Home media ==
This film, together with In Vanda's Room (2000) and Colossal Youth (2006), was released by the Criterion Collection in a box set Letters from Fontainhas: Three Films by Pedro Costa.

== See also ==
- In Vanda's Room
- Colossal Youth
- Docufiction
- List of docufiction films
- Ethnofiction
- Cinéma vérité
