= Batuque, the Soul of a People =

- Theatrical poster
- Directed by: Júlio Silvão Tavares
- Written by: Júlio Silvão Tavares
- Produced by: Marie-Clémence Paes; Luis Correia
- Cinematography: Cesar Paes
- Edited by: César Paes; Agnès Contensou
- Production companies: LX Filmes; Laterit Production; R.F.O.
- Distributed by: LX Filmes (Portugal); Marfilmes (worldwide)
- Release date: 15 May 2006 (Portuguese TV premiere)
- Running time: 52 minutes
- Country: Cape Verde
- Languages: Portuguese; Creole; English subtitles
- Budget: €2,000

Batuque, the Soul of a People (French title:Batuque, l'âme d'un peuple) is a 2006 documentary film written and directed by Júlio Silvão Tavares about the batuque musical group Raiz di Tambarina, and roots of this musical genre in Santiago, Cape Verde.

== Synopsis ==
African slaves were first brought to Cape Verde by Portuguese settlers in 1462. These slaves brought with them the cultural rhythm and music which would become Batuque: a musical form punctuated by drums while participants danced in a circle. The dance, repressed during the Colonial era, has been adopted as a symbol of the Cape Verdan cultural identity. The film seeks to document the dance form through interviews and performance by the musical group Raiz di Tambarina.

== Production ==
Batuque, the Soul of a People was Silvão's first film. He participated in a course with the Africadoc network before beginning production. The film was initially pitched by Silvão in Senegal, filmed in Cape Verde and edited in France.

== Release ==
The film was screened in Lisbon in November 2010, with the filmmaker in attendance, before traveling to festivals in Brazil and the United States. It had previously screened at Africa in the Picture, Netherlands, the Copenhagen International Documentary Festival, Denmark, the 24th International Documentary Film Festival Amsterdam, Netherlands, the Africa in Motion film festival, Edinburgh, Scotland, and the AfryKamera Film Festival, Poland.
