= Colossal Youth (film) =

- Directed by: Pedro Costa
- Written by: Pedro Costa
- Produced by: Francisco Villa-Lobos
- Starring: Ventura; Vanda Duarte; Beatriz Duarte; Cila Cardoso; Alberto "Lento" Barros
- Cinematography: Pedro Costa; Leonardo Simões
- Edited by: Pedro Marques
- Music by: Nuno Carvalho
- Distributed by: Memento Films
- Release dates: November 23, 2006 (Portugal); April 28, 2007 (SFIFF)
- Running time: 156 minutes
- Country: Portugal
- Languages: Cape Verdean Creole; Portuguese

Colossal Youth (Portuguese: Juventude em Marcha, literally "Youth on the March") is a 2006 docufiction feature film directed by Portuguese director Pedro Costa. It was third feature by Costa set in Lisbon's Fontainhas neighborhood (after Ossos and In Vanda's Room), and the first to feature the recurring character Ventura.

Colossal Youth was shot on DV in long, static takes; it also mixes documentary and fiction storytelling. The film is a meditation on the aftermath of the Carnation Revolution and its consequences for Portugal's poverty-stricken Cape Verdean immigrants. It was part of the Official Competition at the 2006 Cannes Film Festival.

== Plot ==
The film opens with a shot of a doorway in a run-down neighborhood. Furniture comes crashing down on the pavement from a second-floor window, followed by a close shot of a woman holding a knife and ranting. As in other parts of the movie, relationships of time and space between shots are not clear. It is not certain that the woman was the one throwing out the furniture or that the man she is complaining about is Ventura, the 75-year-old main character. (Like most of the film's other characters, Ventura is played by a nonprofessional.) Much of the film is taken up with Ventura's visits to other people in the area, many of whom he refers to as his "children." Sometimes in return, they refer to him as "Papa." At other times, Ventura is shown in his new, bright but almost barren, government-provided apartment, which contrasts sharply with the squalid and dark tenements that are due to be destroyed. Those rooms are often filmed in a high-contrast style that makes them strangely beautiful.

Ventura is asked to write a love letter by a fellow Cape Verdean (Lento) for his wife. Ventura's recitation of the letter becomes a recurring theme in the film. At times in the film, there are also allusions to past lives in the Cape Verde Islands and to Portugal's political past, the title "Youth on the March" being especially ironic.

== Cast ==
- Ventura
- Vanda Duarte
- Paula Barrulas
- Cila Cardoso
- Silva 'Nana' Alexandre
- Alberto 'Lento' Barros as Lento
- Beatriz Duarte
- Paulo Nunes
- Gustavo Sumpta
- António Semedo
- José Maria Pina
- Isabel Cardoso as Clotilde

== Credits ==
- Director: Pedro Costa
- Producer: Francisco Villa-Lobos
- Cinematography: Pedro Costa, Leonardo Simões
- Editing: Pedro Marques
- Co-producer: Philippe Avril, Andres Pfaeffli / Elda Guidinetti
- Sound: Olivier Blanc
- Sound: Vasco Pedroso, Jean-Pierre Laforce

== Reception ==
When the film premiered at the 2006 Cannes Film Festival, many in the audience walked out, apparently frustrated by the film's long, static shots, long stretches of silence, and lack of narrative clarity. On the review aggregator website Rotten Tomatoes, 86% of 22 critics' reviews are positive, with an average rating of 7.8/10. The website's consensus reads: "Colossal Youth is an enthralling and epic reverie whose running time will test -- and ultimately reward -- viewer's patience." Roger Ebert reported that he did not go to see the film because the Time magazine critic Richard Corliss had warned him that his wife had gone and "walked out after an hour because the movie made her feel like rats were fighting in her skull.” Other critics, however, have given the film serious consideration, comparing it to films by other directors notable for their slow and spare styes, including Yasujiro Ozu, Robert Bresson, and the team of Jean-Marie Straub and Danièle Huillet (one of Costa's mentors).

In a New York Times review, Manohla Dargis called Colossal Youth one of the most "misunderstood" films at Cannes, remarking, "Beautifully photographed, this elliptical, sometime confounding, often mysterious and wholly beguiling mixture of fiction and nonfiction looks and sounds as if it were made on another planet. And, in some respects, it was." In 2007, Slant magazine critic Fernando F. Croce wrote that it is "as a compassionate and unmistakably spiritual document . . . that Colossal Youth leaves its deepest marks . . . and an intimidating aesthetic experiment becomes directly, colossally affecting." And in a 2008 review, critic David Balfour describes the film as "a truly remarkable work from a man of unique vision," adding "It will divide those see it, even those who stay with it. The sense of dislocated in time and place is unique. The effect of the film is cumulative."

== Home video ==
This film, together with Ossos (1997) and In Vanda's Room (2000), is released by the Criterion Collection in a box set Letters from Fontainhas: Three Films by Pedro Costa.

== See also ==
- List of docufiction films
- Ethnofiction
