= Pedro Costa =

Portuguese film director

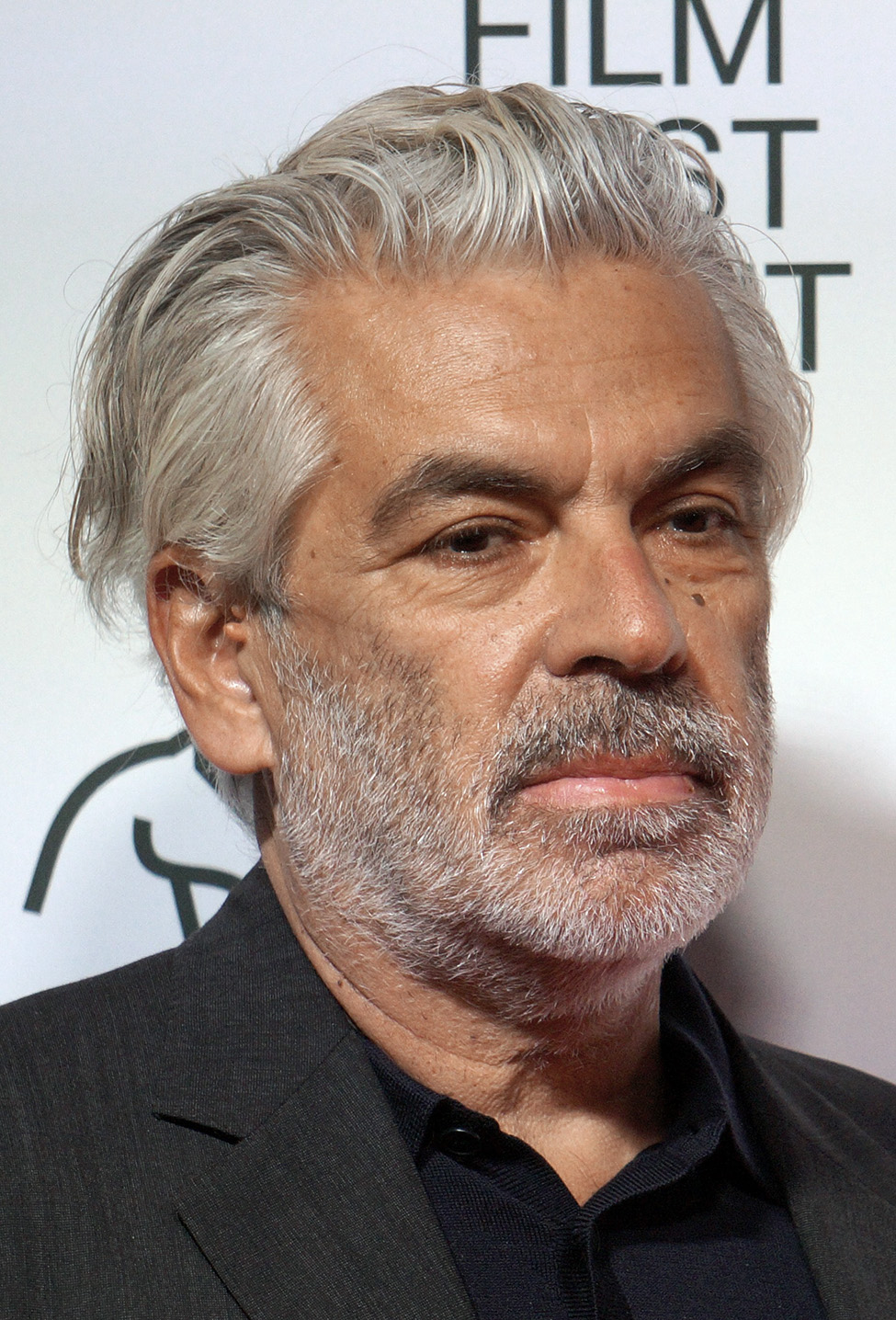
- Costa in 2020
- Born: 30 December 1958 (age 67); Lisbon, Portugal
- Education: University of Lisbon; Lisbon Theatre and Film School
- Occupation: Filmmaker
- Years active: 1984–present

Pedro Costa (born 30 December 1958) is a Portuguese filmmaker. His films are usually set in the Greater Lisbon Area, starring non-professional actors and focusing on the lives of the impoverished immigrants residents of slums in Fontainhas, Amadora.

For Vitalina Varela (2019) he won the Golden Leopard at the 72nd Locarno Film Festival.

== Biography ==
After completing a degree in history from the University of Lisbon, Costa worked as an assistant for Jorge Silva Melo, Vítor Gonçalves and João Botelho. He released his debut film O Sangue at the age of 30.

Costa's films would receive acclaim from critics consistently throughout his career. He collected the France Culture Award (Foreign Cineaste of the Year) at 2002 Cannes Film Festival for directing In Vanda's Room. Colossal Youth was selected for the 2006 Cannes Film Festival and earned the Independent/Experimental prize (Los Angeles Film Critics Association) in 2008. Horse Money was awarded the Leopard for Best Director in 2014, while his Vitalina Varela was awarded the Gold Leopard for Best Film in 2019.

== Style and influences ==
He is considered to be part of "The School of Reis" film family. António Reis, Portuguese director, was his teacher at the Lisbon Theatre and Film School.

His menteeship under directors Straub–Huillet was explored in his 2001 documentary "Where Does Your Hidden Smile Lie?".

Stephen Whitty of Screen Daily described Costa's films as "lit like a Rembrandt, [and] acted like a neo-realist classic." He is acclaimed for using his ascetic style to depict marginalised people, often non-actors playing themselves, in desperate living situations. Shot on digital video and making use of non-actors, Costa's early works have been called examples of docufiction. Although continuing to collaborate with non-actors in his later works, he would gradually transition away from the low-resolution documentary style into what critic Armond White characterised as "museum-quality compositions".

=== Fontainhas sequence ===
From the release of Ossos onwards, Costa's films have been entirely set in Fontainhas, a slum neighbourhood on the outskirts of Lisbon. His subjects, immigrants and the socially disadvantaged, feature as recurring characters throughout the sequence. One notable example is the character of Ventura, protagonist of both Colossal Youth and Horse Money.

== Political views ==
In December 2023, alongside 50 other filmmakers, Costa signed an open letter published in Libération demanding a ceasefire and an end to the killing of civilians amid the 2023 Israeli invasion of the Gaza Strip, and for a humanitarian corridor into Gaza to be established for humanitarian aid, and the release of hostages.

In January 2024, alongside over 300 other filmmakers, producers and actors, Costa signed an open letter against the cuts to the funding of the Argentine film agency INCAA contemplated by the so-called omnibus bill.

== Filmography ==
=== Features ===
- O Sangue (1989)
- Casa de Lava (1994)
- Ossos (1997)
- In Vanda's Room (2000)
- Colossal Youth (2006)
- Horse Money (2014)
- Vitalina Varela (2019)

=== Documentaries and shorts ===
- Where Does Your Hidden Smile Lie? (2001) (documentary)
- "The End of a Love Affair" (2003) (short)
- "State of the World" (2007) -Tarrafa segment (short)
- "Memories" (2007) - The Rabbit Hunter segment (short)
- Change Nothing (2009) (documentary)
- "O nosso Homem" (2010) (short)
- "Sweet Exorcist" (2012) - Centro Histórico segment (short)
- "The Daughters of Fire" (2023) (short)

=== Plays ===
- The Daughters of Fire (2016)

== See also ==
- Docufiction
- Ethnofiction
- List of directors associated with art film
