= Horse Money =

- Theatrical release poster
- Directed by: Pedro Costa
- Release date: August 13, 2014 (Locarno)
- Country: Portugal
- Languages: Portuguese, Cape Verdean creole

Horse Money (Portuguese: Cavalo Dinheiro) is a 2014 Portuguese film directed by Pedro Costa. It premiered in August 2014 at the Locarno International Film Festival, where it won the award for Best Direction. Horse Money is the fourth film in a sequence of films set in the Fontainhas slum region in Lisbon, and the second with character Venturas as the protagonist.

== Plot ==
Ventura, an elderly Cape Verdean immigrant living in Lisbon, travels through the night, through real and imagined nightmarish memories.

== Release ==
Horse Money was in competition for the Golden Leopard at the 2014 Locarno International Film Festival.

=== Critical response ===
The film received critical acclaim. Matt Zoller Seitz, a film critic for RogerEbert.com, gave the film three and a half out of four stars, stating that "the best approach [to Horse Money] is to surrender to it as you might a dream and let the images overwhelm you." The international film magazine Sight & Sound named it the third best film of 2014, behind Boyhood and Goodbye to Language while tying with the film Leviathan.

== Distribution ==
- matango.tv (Italian distribution)
