= Frank Capra filmography =

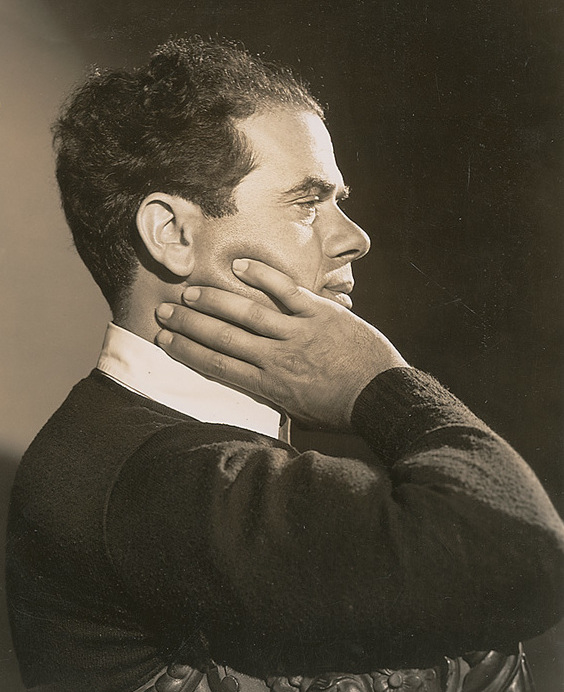
Publicity photo of director Frank Capra

Frank Capra (May 5, 1897 – September 3, 1991) was an Italian American film director, producer and writer who became the creative force behind some of the major award-winning films of the 1930s and 1940s. Capra directed a total of 36 feature-length films (34 of which are known to survive) and 16 documentary films during his lifetime.

His movies It's a Wonderful Life, Mr. Smith Goes to Washington, and Mr. Deeds Goes to Town are often cited among the greatest films ever made.

The following are the films directed by Frank Capra, along with a listing of his awards.

== Filmography ==
=== Films ===
Year	Title	Notes
Silent films
1921	La Visita Dell'Incrociatore Italiano Libya a San Francisco	short news film; directorial debut
1922	Fultah Fisher's Boarding House	short film
1926	The Strong Man	
1927	Long Pants	
1927	For the Love of Mike	lost
1928	That Certain Thing	
1928	So This Is Love?	
1928	The Matinee Idol	
1928	The Way of the Strong	
1928	Say It with Sables	lost
1928	Submarine	
1928	The Power of the Press	
Sound films
1929	The Younger Generation	partially silent
1929	The Donovan Affair	lost soundtrack
1929	Flight	
1930	Ladies of Leisure	
1930	Rain or Shine	
1931	Dirigible	
1931	The Miracle Woman	
1931	Platinum Blonde	
1932	Forbidden	
1932	American Madness	
1933	The Bitter Tea of General Yen	
1933	Lady for a Day	
1934	It Happened One Night	
1934	Broadway Bill	
1936	Mr. Deeds Goes to Town	
1937	Lost Horizon	
1938	You Can't Take It with You	
1939	Mr. Smith Goes to Washington	
1941	Meet John Doe	
1944	Arsenic and Old Lace	Filmed in 1941.
1946	It's a Wonderful Life	
1948	State of the Union	
1950	Riding High	Remake of Broadway Bill
1951	Here Comes the Groom	
1956	Our Mr. Sun	Educational documentary / Producer and writer
1957	Hemo the Magnificent	Educational documentary / Producer and writer
1957	The Strange Case of the Cosmic Rays	Educational documentary
1958	Unchained Goddess	Educational documentary / Producer and writer ONLY; Carlson dir.
1959	A Hole in the Head	First narrative color film
1961	Pocketful of Miracles	Final Theatrical Feature Film / Remake of Lady for a Day
1964	Rendezvous In Space	Final Film

=== War Films ===
Year	Title	Notes
1942	Why We Fight: Prelude to War	Co-directed with Anatole Litvak
1943	Why We Fight: The Nazis Strike	Short film / Co-directed with Anatole Litvak
1943	Why We Fight: Divide and Conquer	Co-directed with Anatole Litvak
1943	Why We Fight: The Battle of Britain	Co-directed with Anthony Veiller
1943	Why We Fight: The Battle of Russia	Co-directed with Anatole Litvak
1944	Why We Fight: The Battle of China	Co-directed with Anatole Litvak
1944	Tunisian Victory	Co-directed with Hugh Stewart
1944	The Negro Soldier	Capra is producer only; Stuart Heisler, director
1945	Your Job in Germany	Short film
1945	Two Down and One to Go	Short film
1945	Why We Fight: War Comes to America	Co-directed with Anatole Litvak
1945	Know Your Enemy: Japan	Co-directed with Joris Ivens
1945	Here Is Germany	

=== Films directed by Capra nominated for Academy Awards ===
Year	Film	Oscar Nominations	Oscar Wins	Performances Nominations
1933	Lady for a Day	4	0	Best Actress for May Robson (nom)
1934	It Happened One Night	5	5	Best Actor for Clark Gable; Best Actress for Claudette Colbert
1936	Mr. Deeds Goes to Town	5	1	Best Actor for Gary Cooper (nom)
1937	Lost Horizon	7	2	Best Supporting Actor for H. B. Warner (nom)
1938	You Can't Take It With You	7	2	Best Supporting Actress for Spring Byington (nom)
1939	Mr. Smith Goes to Washington	11	1	Best Actor for James Stewart (nom); Best Supporting Actor for Harry Carey (nom); Best Supporting Actor for Claude Rains (nom)
1941	Meet John Doe	1	0	
1942	Prelude to War	1	1	Academy Award for Best Documentary Feature
1943	The Battle of Russia	1	0	Academy Award for Best Documentary Feature (nom)
1946	It's a Wonderful Life	5	0	Best Actor for James Stewart (nom)
1951	Here Comes the Groom	2	1	
1959	A Hole in the Head	1	1	
1961	Pocketful of Miracles	3	0	Best Supporting Actor for Peter Falk (nom)

== Awards and nominations ==
Year	Film	Award	Winner
1933	Lady for a Day	Outstanding Production	Winfield Sheehan – Cavalcade
1933	Lady for a Day	Best Director	Frank Lloyd – Cavalcade
1934	It Happened One Night	Outstanding Production	With Harry Cohn
1934	It Happened One Night	Best Director	check
1936	Mr. Deeds Goes to Town	Outstanding Production	Hunt Stromberg – The Great Ziegfeld
1936	Mr. Deeds Goes to Town	Best Director	check
1937	Lost Horizon	Outstanding Production	Henry Blanke – The Life of Emile Zola
1938	You Can't Take It With You	Outstanding Production	check
1938	You Can't Take It With You	Best Director	check
1939	Mr. Smith Goes to Washington	Outstanding Production	David O. Selznick – Gone with the Wind
1939	Mr. Smith Goes to Washington	Best Director	Victor Fleming – Gone with the Wind
1943	Prelude to War	Best Documentary	check
1944	The Battle of Russia	Best Documentary, Features	Desert Victory
1946	It's a Wonderful Life	Best Motion Picture	Samuel Goldwyn – The Best Years of Our Lives
1946	It's a Wonderful Life	Best Director	William Wyler – The Best Years of Our Lives

American Film Institute

- Life Achievement Award (1982)

Directors Guild of America

- Best Director Nomination for A Hole in the Head (1959)
- Life Achievement Award (1959)
- Best Director Nomination for Pocketful of Miracles (1961)

Golden Globe Award

- Best Director Award for It's a Wonderful Life (1946)

Venice Film Festival

- Mussolini Cups for best foreign film Nomination for It Happened One Night (1934)
- Mussolini Cups for best foreign film Nomination for Mr. Deeds Goes to Town (1936)
- Golden Lion (1982)

American Film Institute recognition

- AFI's 100 Years... 100 Movies (10th Anniversary Edition)
  - It's a Wonderful Life...# 20
  - Mr. Smith Goes to Washington...# 26
  - It Happened One Night...# 46
- AFI's 100 Years... 100 Cheers
  - It's a Wonderful Life...# 1
  - Mr. Smith Goes to Washington...# 5
  - Meet John Doe...# 49
  - Mr. Deeds Goes to Town...# 83
- AFI's 100 Years... 100 Laughs
  - It Happened One Night...# 8
  - Arsenic and Old Lace...# 30
  - Mr. Deeds Goes to Town...# 70
- AFI's 100 Years... 100 Passions
  - It's a Wonderful Life...# 8
  - It Happened One Night...# 38
- AFI's 100 Years... 100 Heroes and Villains
  - 50 greatest movie heroes
  - It's a Wonderful Life...George Bailey ...# 9
  - Mr. Smith Goes to Washington...Jefferson Smith ...# 11
  - 50 greatest movie villains
  - It's a Wonderful Life...Mister Potter ...# 6
- AFI's 10 Top 10
  - Fantasy
    - It's a Wonderful Life...# 3
  - Romantic Comedies
    - It Happened One Night...# 3

United States National Film Registry

- The Strong Man (1926)
- The Power of the Press (1928)
- It Happened One Night (1934)
- Lost Horizon (1937)
- Mr. Smith Goes to Washington (1939)
- Why We Fight Series of seven films (1942)
- It's a Wonderful Life (1946)
