= The Battle of China =

1944 film by Anatole Litvak, Frank Capra

- Film
- Directed by: Frank Capra; Anatole Litvak
- Written by: Julius Epstein; Philip Epstein
- Produced by: Office of War Information
- Narrated by: Anthony Veiller
- Cinematography: Robert Flaherty
- Edited by: William Hornbeck
- Distributed by: War Activities Committee of the Motion Pictures Industry
- Release date: 1944
- Running time: 65 minutes
- Country: United States
- Language: English

The Battle of China (1944) was the sixth film of Frank Capra's Why We Fight propaganda film series.

== Summary ==
Following its introductory credits, which are displayed to the Army Air Force Orchestra's cover version of "March of the Volunteers", the movie opens on footage of the Japanese invasion of China and then briefly introduces the history, geography, and people of China. The film contrasts the development of the Republic of China under Sun Yat-sen , which it deems as peaceful, with the militarized modernization of the Empire of Japan:

Here was their mad dream:
Phase One – the occupation of Manchuria for raw materials.
Phase Two – the absorption of China for manpower.
Phase Three – a triumphant sweep to the south to seize the riches of the Indies.
Phase Four – the eastward move to crush the United States.

It is stated in the film that Japan moved gradually to avoid external interference but accelerated its actions in response to the Republic of China's growing unity and development. The first attack on China is depicted as the Battle of Shanghai, with the aerial bombardment that produced the "Bloody Saturday" photograph is called the first such attack on civilians in history. The film then includes graphic footage of the aftermath of the Rape of Nanjing (then called "Nanking") that is said to have been smuggled out of occupied China by a hospital worker.

Additionally, the film covers the relocation of personnel and resources to Chongqing (then called "Chungking"), as well as the Japanese bombing of Chongqing

The expansion of the National Revolutionary Army is described, including footage of their drills and of a young girl training with a machine gun. The "Flying Tigers" are mentioned, along with their record of 20 kills for each lost plane.

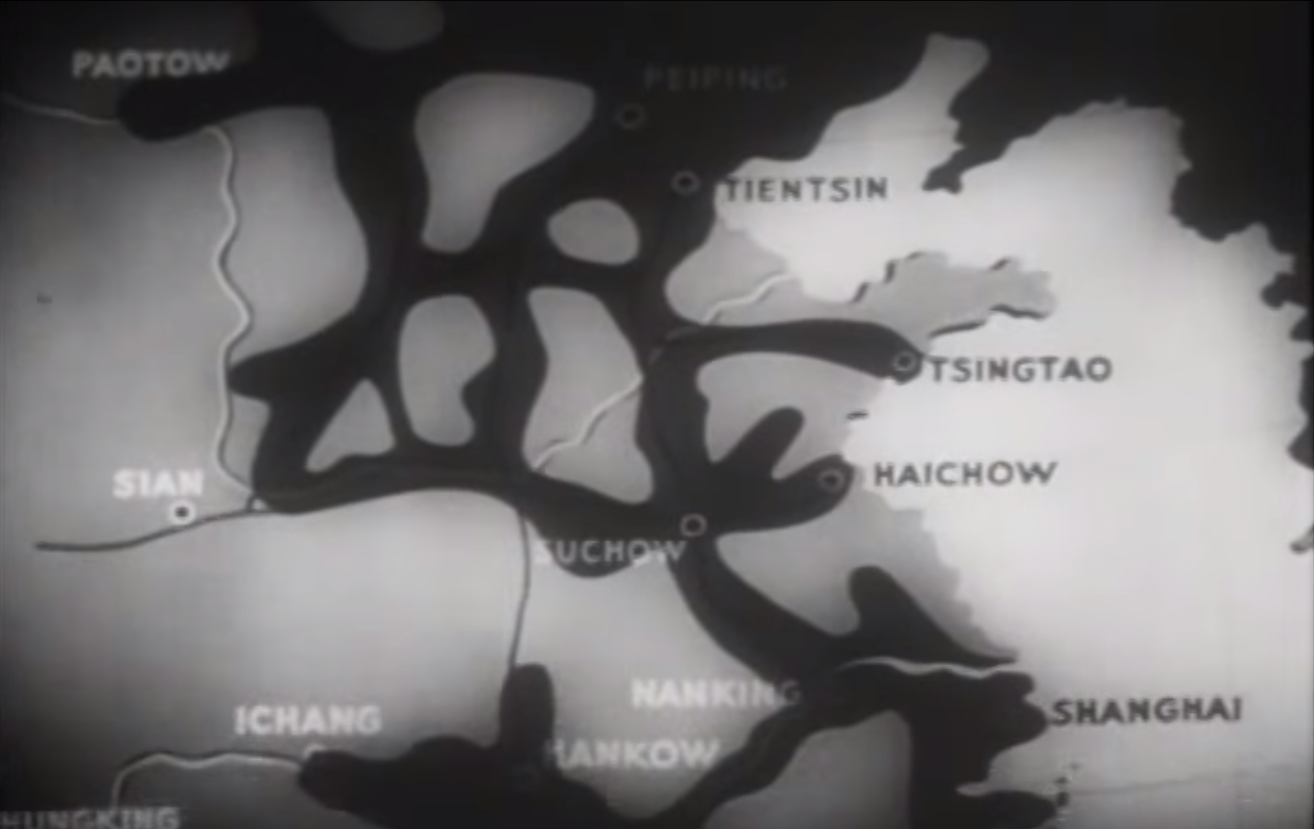
"You will notice this map of Jap conquests does not look like the military maps you have seen in the previous films..."

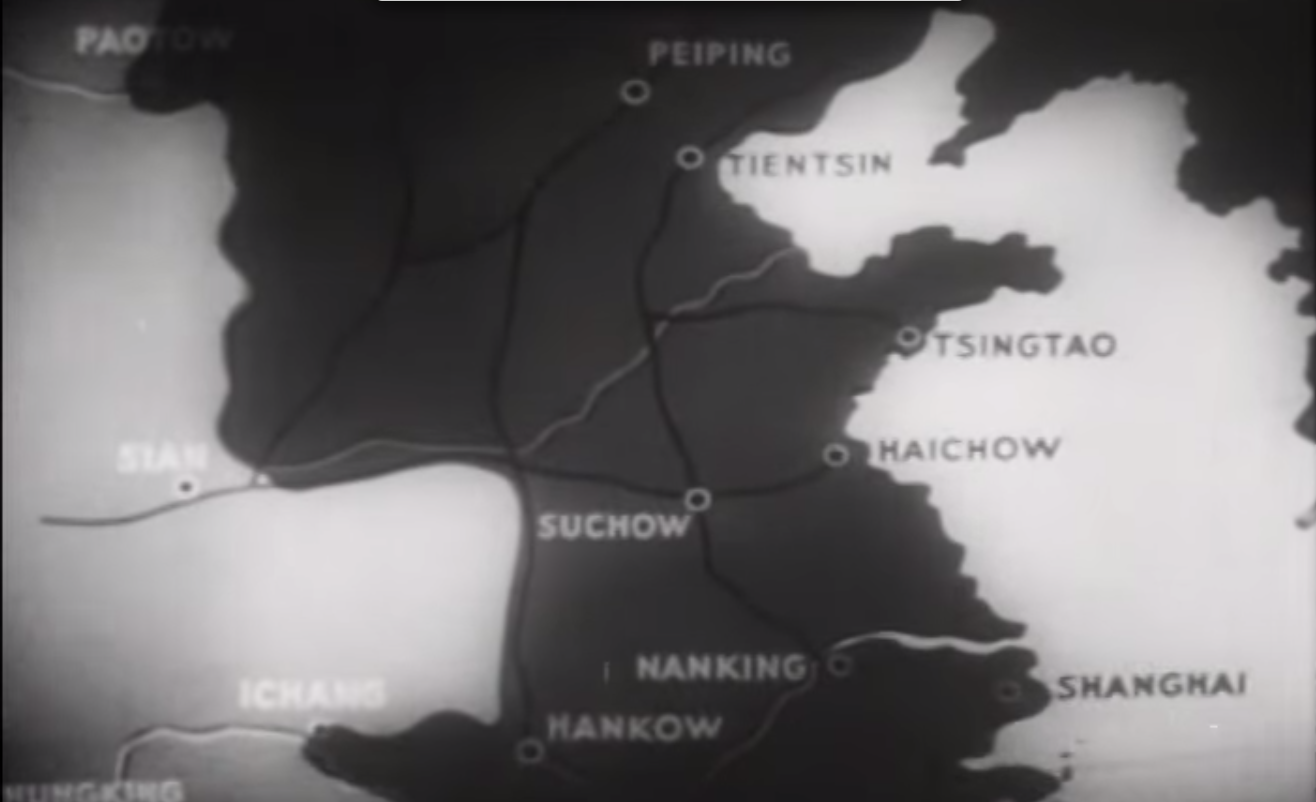
"By all military standards, it should have looked like this. ... But the Japanese were still learning that the occupation of Chinese cities and control of Chinese rivers and rail-roads still was far from meaning the subjugation of China."

The Japanese, often referenced as "Japs" and less often as "Nips", blockade and occupation of China's ports is discussed, and the rebuilding of China's destroyed rail system is called the work of "slave labor". The "New China", which refers to the ROC government in Chongqing, is shown as connected to the outside world only through the "narrow-gauge" Indo-Chinese railway and the "camel caravans" from the Soviet Union across the Gobi Desert. (The railway is described as "limited" and "too near Jap territory to be safe".) The construction of the Burma Road between Lashio in Burma and the truck road to Kunming is then described. A task said to have needed seven years with the most modern machinery is shown being constructed with simple laborers in less than twelve months. Japan's assault on the junction of the Pinghan and the Longhai Railways at Zhengzhou (then called "Chengchow") is shown having been prevented by the induced flooding of the Yellow River, which is described in the film, as the trading of space for time. The guerrilla warfare behind Japanese lines is lionized and treated as nearly unique in the war.

Bogged down but freed from worry of Soviet interference by Germany's invasion. and from British interference by its naval commitment to the Battle of the Atlantic, Japan is shown in its attack on Pearl Harbor before the Americans could complete their planned two-ocean navy. The film admits that a series of defeats in Malaysia, Singapore, Hong Kong, and Corregidor have left the Chinese isolated from their new allies, all the more so after the loss of the Burma Road.The worsening situation then serves to make the film's extended treatment of the Chinese victory at Changsha in 1942 all the more impressive.

The film then shifts to 1944, with the American forces sweeping westward across the Pacific to China's defense. The Allied forces massed in British India are shown flying Chinese troops southwest to train them, equip them with modern weaponry and tactics, and work to construct the Ledo Road. Footage of The Hump airlift is shown to the tune of the "Army Air Force" anthem. Before an American flag, Soong Mei-ling, "Madame Chiang Kai-shek", is shown announcing in English to the US Congress,

We in China want a better world not for ourselves alone ... but for all mankind. And we must have it.

Congress responds with a standing ovation. The montage of the marching armies of China are shown while a Chinese chorus sings "The March of the Volunteers". Against the end of the anthem, the film ends, like the others in the series, with General George Marshall's admonition: "The victory of the democracies can only be complete with the utter defeat of the war machines of Germany and Japan." A large V is displayed over the ringing Liberty Bell.

== Inaccuracies ==
The film contains various inaccuracies in regards to the war in China. Towards the beginning, the motives and militarization of Japan are described with the Tanaka Memorial as reference, an alleged Japanese strategic planning document that has been discredited by many historians.

Contrary to many modern timelines of the war, the film downplays Chinese resistance in Manchuria and presents the Marco Polo Bridge Incident as largely peaceful and a foregone conclusion. Instead, the Battle of Shanghai is presented as the beginning of real hostilities.

Additionally, the death toll of the Nanjing Massacre is presented as unprecedented, but the casualty count of 40,000 is far lower than most modern estimates.

The Chinese communists are mentioned only obliquely by the film's repeated reference to China's division and factions. The Xi'an Incident is similarly omitted. When discussing the Indo-Chinese railway, the film omits France's role in the closing of the railway, and when discussing Japan's attack on Pearl Harbor, the necessity of controlling the oil fields of the Dutch East Indies as a reason is omitted.

== Maps ==
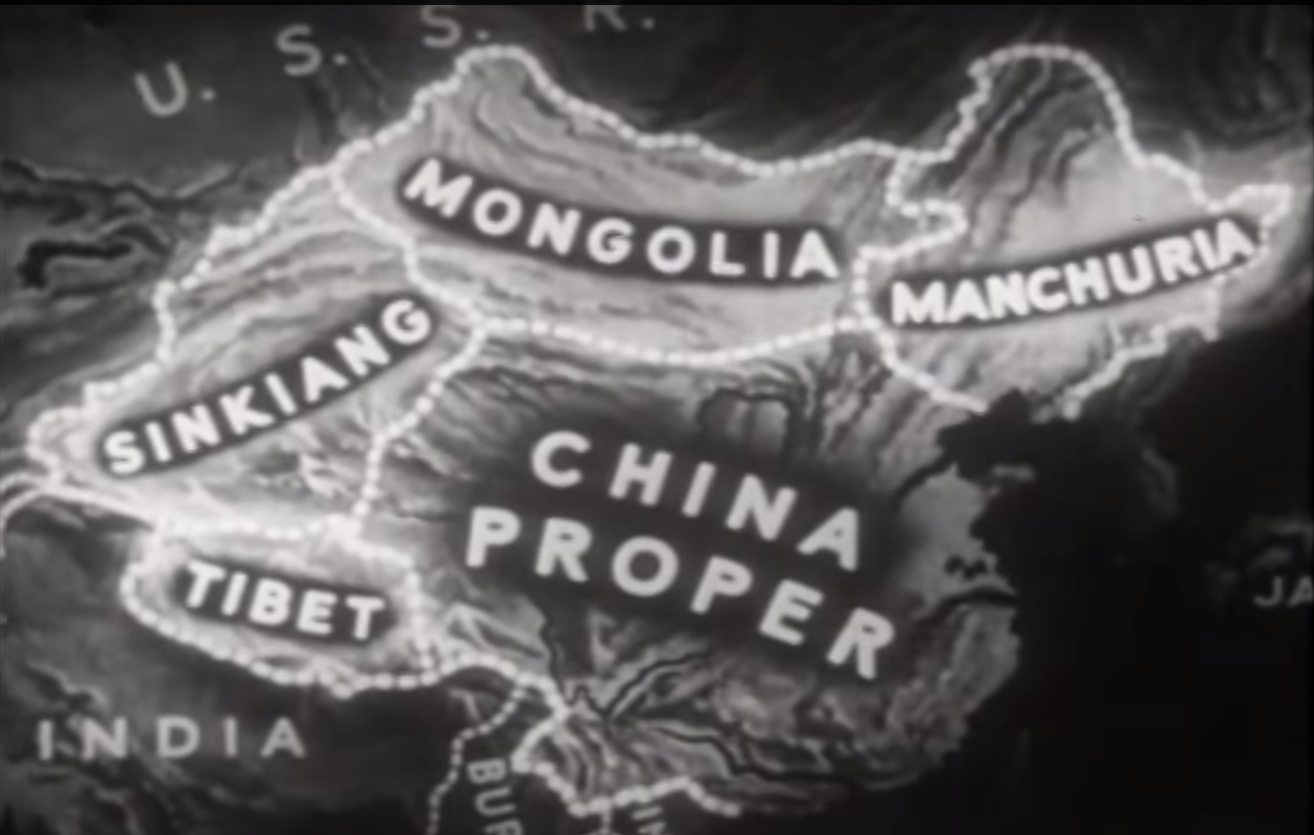
The film's map of "China" divided into China Proper, Manchuria, Mongolia, Sinkiang (Xinjiang), and Tibet, all with borders according to Chinese claims except in the case of British India.

The introductory maps shown in the film show "China" as divided into "China Proper" and four outer provinces, namely "Manchuria", "Mongolia", "Sinkiang" (Xinjiang), and "Tibet". The very concept of a "China Proper"—either presently or historically—remains highly debated. The Japanese puppet state in Manchuria is discussed but never treated as actually separate from China. The borders of the outer territories follow the claims of the Republic of China, which means "Manchuria" includes some territory now administered by Russia and the film's "Mongolia" is Greater Mongolia, including the Qing and Republican province of Outer Mongolia (now the independent state of Mongolia) and including Tannu Uriankhai, now administered by Russia. Minor borderlands of Afghanistan, Pakistan, and India are also claimed, as well as large areas of the Tajik province of Gorno-Badakhshan, the Indian state of Arunachal Pradesh, and the Burmese state of Kachin.

Further, throughout the film, Taiwan itself is treated as accepted territory of the Empire of Japan and not an occupied area of Chinese territory.

== International use ==
The Australian armed services also used the American information film, ending with an extended scrolling text describing the film as "the story of what might have happened in Australia". The language is somewhat stronger than the American version, calling Japan "the yellow flood", "the octopus", and "the little yellow men"; the Germans "Hitler's barbarians"; and Saburō Kurusu "slimy".

== See also ==
- List of American films of 1944
- Propaganda in the United States
- Why We Fight
