= Divide and Conquer (film) =

1943 propaganda film by Frank Capra

- Film
- Directed by: Frank Capra; Anatole Litvak
- Written by: Julius Epstein; Philip G. Epstein
- Produced by: Frank Capra
- Narrated by: Walter Huston
- Cinematography: Robert Flaherty
- Edited by: William Hornbeck; William A. Lyon
- Music by: Uncredited: William Lava
- Production company: Office of War Information
- Distributed by: Warner Bros. War Activities Committee of the Motion Pictures Industry
- Release date: 1943
- Running time: 56 minutes
- Country: United States
- Language: English

Divide and Conquer (1943) is the third film of Frank Capra's Why We Fight propaganda film series and deals with the Nazi conquest of Western Europe in 1940.

== Synopsis ==
The film begins immediately after the invasion of Poland. Of the two major Western Allies on 1940, the United Kingdom is first to be mentioned. The role of the Royal Navy in blockading Germany is highlighted as Germany being forced to overcome British resistance to clear the way for its world conquest.

Hitler's treachery towards the small neutral countries of Europe is exposed: to Denmark ("We have concluded a non-aggression pact with Denmark"), Norway ("Germany never had any quarrel with the Northern States and has none today"), the Netherlands ("The new Reich has always endeavored to maintain the traditional friendship with Holland") and Belgium: ("The Reich has put forth no claim which may in any way be regarded as a threat to Belgium"). Those quotes are repeated after the conquest of each of those countries is shown.

The first German targets in 1940 are Denmark and Norway. Interest in Norway is described in terms of Germany's desire to use Norway's fjords as U-boat bases, and airfields in Norway for a bomber attack on the British naval base at Scapa Flow. After Hitler's surprise invasion of Denmark is briefly mentioned, the film accuses the Nazis of using Trojan horse ships, which are designed to look like merchant ships but conceal troops, tanks, and artillery guns, to seize control of all of Norway's ports. The role of Norwegian traitors such as Vidkun Quisling in aiding the conquest of Norway is also emphasized. At the end of the section on Norway, Hitler is likened to the gangster John Dillinger, and occupied Norway is portrayed as the northern claw of a giant pincer movement aimed against Britain. The conquest of France would provide the southern claw.

The film's story of France begins in 1914 at the Battle of the Marne. The offensive-minded spirit of French General Ferdinand Foch is emphasized: "My right is driven in, my center is giving way, the situation is excellent, I attack!" (the original in French is displayed onscreen). The film then goes on to describe the defensive orientation of 1930s France, exemplified by the Maginot Line, which is explained as being the result of the six million casualties suffered by France during World War I along with factors including Nazi fifth column activities, political corruption, and greedy vested interests.

A famous scene of Divide and Conquer (at 54:50) depicts the departure of the defeated French army from the Marseille harbor, in southern France, while France is taken over by the Nazis and Pétain's regime, which collaborates with them. That weeping man, Jérôme Barzotti, became an iconic depiction of French defeat.

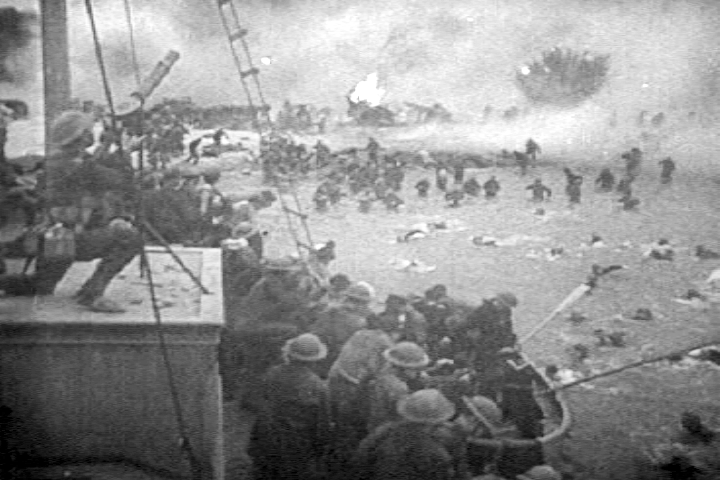
Feature film re-enactment of British troops under fire on the beach at Dunkirk.

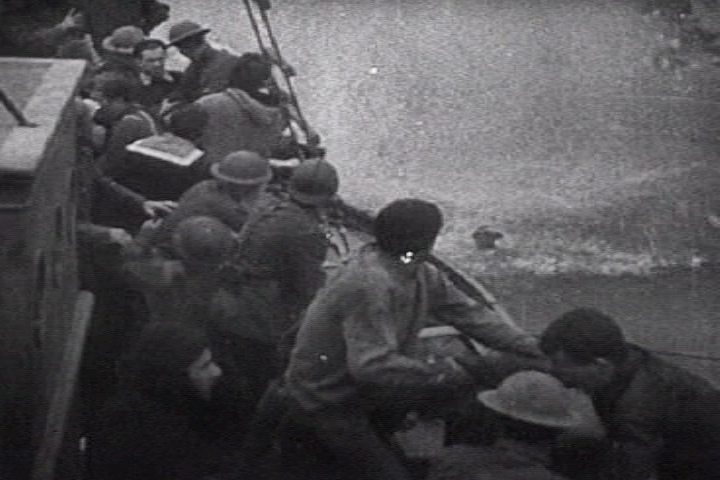
Feature film re-enactment of a British fisherman giving a hand to an Allied soldier while a Stuka's bomb explodes a few metres ahead

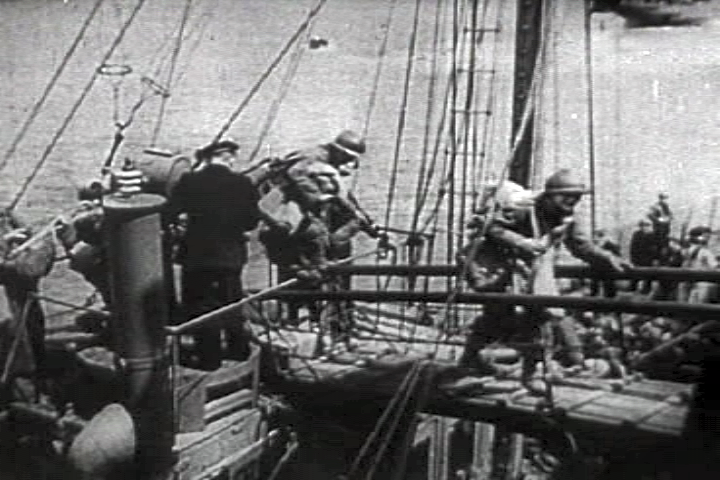
Included footage from the Dunkirk evacuation: French troops embarking on a British ship.

Possible routes for a German invasion of France are discussed: the 1870 attack through Alsace-Lorraine and the 1914 attack through Belgium. The French, believing the Maginot Line to be impregnable, expect the German attack to come through Belgium, as it did in 1914. The French order of battle in 1940 is described: 78 divisions along the border with Belgium, 15 in the Maginot Line, 10 divisions facing Benito Mussolini's forces in Italy, and 3½ divisions as a safeguard against Spain. The British Expeditionary Force contribute an additional 10 divisions.

The important role of paratroopers in the conquest of the Netherlands is covered, as is the Germans' easy defeat of the Belgian resistance, at Fort Eben-Emael since they learned a detailed attack plan through extensive practice on an exact copy of the fortress built in occupied Czechoslovakia. Special attention is also paid to Nazi atrocities, such as the Rotterdam Blitz after the surrender of the city, and Nazi attacks on villages and small towns, which are designed to choke roads with refugees to impede Allied troop movements.

The Nazi attack on Belgium and the Netherlands is then mentioned to be a feint that distracts from the main attack through the Ardennes, where the Allies least expect it. A US military officer shows an animation to demonstrate the German blitzkrieg technique: tanks form the front spearhead while infantry spill off from the sides to form solid walls, which protects the center of the column so that trucks can pass to supply all forces involved.

== See also ==
- List of films in the public domain in the United States
- Propaganda in the United States
