= Prelude to War =

1942 film by Frank Capra, Anatole Litvak

- Film
- Directed by: Frank Capra
- Written by: Anthony Veiller; Eric Knight
- Produced by: Frank Capra
- Narrated by: Walter Huston
- Cinematography: Robert Flaherty
- Edited by: William Hornbeck; Michael R. McAdam
- Music by: Uncredited: Hugo Friedhofer; Leigh Harline; Arthur Lange; Cyril J. Mockridge; Alfred Newman; David Raksin
- Distributed by: Twentieth Century-Fox; War Activities Committee of the Motion Pictures Industry
- Release date: May 27, 1943
- Running time: 52 minutes
- Country: United States
- Language: English

Prelude to War is the first film of Frank Capra's Why We Fight film series commissioned by the Office of War Information (OWI) and George C. Marshall. It was made to educate American troops of the necessity of combating the Axis powers during World War II based on the idea that those in the service would fight more willingly and ably if they knew the background and the reason for their participation in the war. The film was later released to the general American public as a rallying cry for support of the war.

== Summary ==
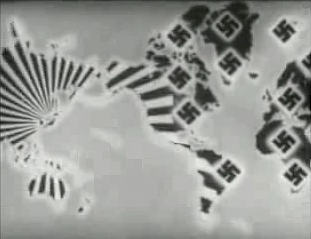
The Axis aim of total world conquest, as shown in Prelude to War.

In an edit added to the film before public release, a comment by US Secretary of War Henry L. Stimson, is quoted to create trust with the audience: "the purpose of these films is to give factual information as to the causes, the events leading up to our entry into the war and the principles for which we are fighting."

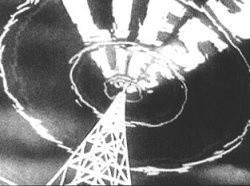
Prelude to War depicts the Nazi propaganda machine.

The purpose of the OWI was to use mass communication to appeal to both serving soldiers and later, the American population on the reasons for the war; and so it released Prelude to War to further those goals. The film starts by an explanation of how Americans were brought into the war through heroic motives to protect countries unable to protect themselves. The film expresses the view that America had this duty to righteousness and Christian values throughout history, according to the values and the beliefs set forth by the Founding Fathers.

The film makes use of compare and contrast methods throughout the film to transmit its heroic message. The primary images used within the film to portray the opponents of America are introduced by Henry Wallace as the "free world," a brightly illuminated planet of the Allies, and a "slave world," a planet deep in shadow of the Axis powers. These maps were animated by Walt Disney Productions.

The film examines the differences between the United States and the fascist Axis states of Benito Mussolini, Adolf Hitler and Hirohito by portraying the latter countries working together as gangsters to conquer the world. That is done by footage from Nazi's Triumph des Willens (Triumph of the Will) but with different narration designed to support the Allied cause.

It is emphasized that after the Nazis smashed the opposing political parties and labor unions, they turned their attention to their last remaining obstacle, the church. In one scene, a stained glass window is shattered by several bricks to reveal a "Heil Hitler!" poster behind. To emphasize that depiction of Hitler as an Antichrist figure, a class of German schoolchildren is shown singing to the song Frederick Rex:

Adolf Hitler is our Saviour, our hero
He is the noblest being in the whole wide world.
For Hitler we live,
For Hitler we die.
Our Hitler is our Lord
Who rules a brave new world.

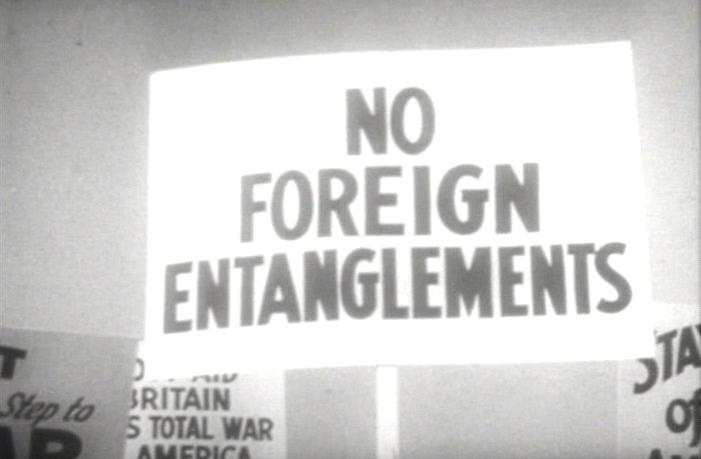
Protestors rallied under slogans like "No Foreign Entanglements"

In the two decades following World War I and the failure of the League of Nations, a spirit of isolationism becomes prevalent throughout the United States and persists until the attack on Pearl Harbor. That presented a major obstacle in garnering support for the war, as Americans did not feel a sense of unity with other nations of the world, most notably, Europe. In an effort to dispel that isolationist way of thinking, Prelude to War was produced to raise the enthusiasm and interest of US troops for the international struggle.

The film addresses the need for change in Americans' views on the war by interviews with civilians. In response to whether or not America should get involved in the war, Americans are depicted saying, "I think we should stay out of it entirely" and "They mean nothing to us." Protesters against the war rally under slogans like "No Foreign Entanglements." The film argues that contrary to the public opinion of the time, American problems "were and always will be dependent upon the problems of the entire world and our peace is gained when there is peace for all."

The film pointed to the Japanese invasion of Manchuria as the beginning of World War II: "remember that date: Sept 18, 1931 a date you should remember as well as Dec 7, 1941. For on that date in 1931 the war we are now fighting begun." It stated that it was known that the aggressors should be stopped but that it was impossible to convince ordinary people "that they should go to war over a mud hut in Manchuria."

After going over the Japanese invasion of China, the film asks about Japan's allies by stating that before Hitler was ready, Mussolini had to be ready since his government had not been able to produce what it had promised and "so he pulled the old trick of a foreign war to divert from troubles at home." The film then describes just how outclassed Ethiopia was against Italy and how "we hadn't realized that peace for us involves peace for all" and that Hitler would be taken up in the next film.

== Significance ==
The US Army used Prelude to War as a training film for soldiers before its release in theaters. Prior to deployment, all US soldiers had to view the film. The goal in showing it to the general public was to unify the country and to encourage all to their part in the war effort. The films produced by Capra inspired society to mobilize as a nation and rally around their country, their troops, and their president.

Despite its initial purpose as a training film, OWI Director Elmer Davis and President Franklin D. Roosevelt were so satisfied with it that it was released theatrically to the general public. The film series was a useful tool in motivating the public and boosted support for the war. It was so well perceived that on March 4, 1943, the Academy of Motion Picture Arts and Sciences awarded an Academy Award to Capra for Prelude to War as the best documentary film of 1942 (The picture was released to the public in 1943, but previously screened to soldiers since 30 October 1942), an illustration of how the government and the military successfully and cohesively relayed their message of national unity to the American people through popular culture.

== See also ==
- Propaganda in the United States
