= The Battle of Russia =

1943 film by Anatole Litvak, Frank Capra

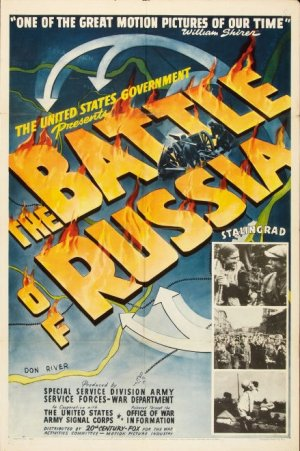
- Poster
- Directed by: Frank Capra; Anatole Litvak
- Written by: Julius J. Epstein; Philip G. Epstein; Anatole Litvak; Anthony Veiller
- Produced by: War Department Special Service Division
- Narrated by: Anthony Veiller; Walter Huston
- Cinematography: Robert J. Flaherty
- Edited by: William Hornbeck
- Music by: Dimitri Tiomkin
- Production company: U.S. Army Pictorial Service
- Distributed by: United States Office of War Information; War Activities Committee of the Motion Pictures Industry; 20th Century Fox
- Release date: November 13, 1943
- Running time: 83 minutes
- Country: United States
- Language: English

The Battle of Russia (1943) is the fifth film of Frank Capra's Why We Fight documentary series. The longest film of the series, it has two parts. It was made in collaboration with Russian-born Anatole Litvak as primary director under Capra's supervision. Litvak gave the film its "shape and orientation," and the film had seven writers with voice narration by Walter Huston. The score was done by the Russian-born Hollywood composer Dimitri Tiomkin and drew heavily on Tchaikovsky along with traditional Russian folk songs and ballads.

The film historian Christopher Meir noted that the film's popularity "extended beyond the military audience for it was initially intended, and was the second in the series to be nominated for an Academy Award for Best Documentary Feature.

== Plot ==
The Battle of Russia Part I

The Battle of Russia Part II

The film begins with an overview of previous failed attempts to conquer Russia: the Teutonic Knights in 1242 (footage from Sergei Eisenstein's film Alexander Nevsky is used), by Charles XII of Sweden in 1704 (footage from Vladimir Petrov's film Peter the Great), by Napoleon I in 1812, and by the German Empire in World War I.

The vast natural resources of the Soviet Union are then described and show why the land is such a hot prize for conquerors. To give a positive impression of the Soviet Union to the American audience, the country's ethnic diversity is covered in detail, and elements of Russian culture that are familiar to Americans, including the musical compositions of Pyotr Ilyich Tchaikovsky and Leo Tolstoy's book War and Peace, are also mentioned. Communism is never mentioned in the film, but the Russian Orthodox Church is described as a force opposing Nazism. The start of the film includes a quote from US General Douglas MacArthur, who commends the Russian people's defense of their nation as one of the most courageous feats in military history.

The film then covers the German conquests of the Balkans, which are described as a preliminary to close off possible Allied counter-invasion routes before the war against Russia was launched on June 22, 1941. The narration describes the German keil und kessel tactics for offensive warfare and the Soviet "defence in depth" tactic to counter that. The scorched earth Soviet tactics, the room-to-room urban warfare in Soviet cities, and the guerilla warfare behind enemy lines are also used to underline the Soviet resolve for victory against the Germans. The Siege of Leningrad and the Battle of Stalingrad conclude the film.

The episode, like other entries in the Why We Fight series, omits many facts that could have cast the Soviet Union in a negative light, such as its occupation of the Baltic states, its war against Finland, its occupation and atrocities in Poland, and its occupation of Romanian territory.

Virtually in line with Soviet propaganda, the series was not only screened but also widely acclaimed in the Soviet Union. The episode has been described as "a blatant pro-Soviet propaganda posing as factual analysis" and was withdrawn from circulation during the Cold War. Capra commented about why certain material was left out:

We had a political problem with Russia on that film. The problem was that a hell of a lot of people on our side were not about to be sold a bill of goods by the Communists. We were their allies, but that was all. Communism was not something we desired. So we stayed a way from politics and made it a people's battle. As a result, The Battle of Russia was one of the best episodes of the series and a true one.

== Awards and honors ==
- 1943: Winner, 1943 National Board of Review Award for Best Documentary Film
- 1943: Special Award, New York Film Critics Circle Awards
- 1944: Nominee, Academy Award for Best Documentary Feature, 16th Academy Awards
- 2000: National Film Registry, as part of the Why We Fight series

== See also ==
- Propaganda in the United States
