= The Battle of Britain =

1943 film by Anthony Veiller, Frank Capra

- Film
- Directed by: Frank Capra; Anthony Veiller
- Written by: Julius Epstein; Philip Epstein
- Produced by: Frank Capra
- Narrated by: Walter Huston
- Cinematography: Robert Flaherty
- Edited by: William Hornbeck
- Music by: Dimitri Tiomkin; William Lava; Howard Jackson
- Production company: Office of War Information
- Distributed by: Warner Bros. War Activities Committee of the Motion Pictures Industry
- Release date: November 24, 1943
- Running time: 52 minutes
- Country: United States
- Language: English

The Battle of Britain was the fourth of Frank Capra's Why We Fight series of seven propaganda films, which made the case for fighting and winning the Second World War. It was released in 1943 and concentrated on the German bombardment of the United Kingdom in anticipation of Operation Sea Lion, the planned German invasion.

== Plot ==
The narrator describes the fall of France, which leaves Britain almost defenceless. British forces are vastly outnumbered, but the British people are calm. The narrator explains that is because in a democracy, the people as a whole are involved in the decision to fight. Hitler's masterplan to subjugate Britain is described. Hitler begins by attacking convoys and ports but fails to destroy them. The RAF is outnumbered "6 - 8 - 10 to one" but knocks out far more planes than the Germans do. Also, bailed-out British pilots can return to the air, but German pilots are lost. Unlike the Dutch and Polish Air Forces, Britain does not "make the mistake of bunching its planes on the runways."

Losses force Hitler to "take time out." He tells Goering to change tactics and so the Luftwaffe attacks factories. Britain deploys "improved listening posts" to identify the coming attacks. In August and September, German losses are far more severe. However, the "German mind" cannot understand why "free people fight on against overwhelming odds." The Germans' now aim to "crush the British spirit" by attacking London and destroying homes, hospitals and churches, but the people adapt and survive. Enraged, Goering takes personal command and sends massive attack on September 15, to which the British respond with "everything they had." In the battle, the Germans suffer severe losses.

Despite many losses and the destruction of historic buildings, the Germans cannot break Britain. They switch to night attacks in the hope of terrorizing the people to make them "cry for mercy" and die of begging, but the people show great resilience. The British also counterattack and bomb key German factories.

Hitler takes revenge by destroying Coventry. After a brief respite at Christmas Hitler sends firebombs to London to create "the greatest fire in recorded history."(Second Great Fire of London) More bombings and firestorms are created, but Britain's defences hold up and give a year of precious time to other countries threatened by Germany. The film ends with Winston Churchill's statement: "never in the field of human conflict has so much been owed by so many to so few."

== Criticism ==
The film has been criticized by the Polish-American historian Mieczysław B. Biskupski for its portrayal of Poland and its contribution to the Second World War. Biskupski specifically focuses on specific instances in the film such a map of Europe being displayed with the eastern half of Poland being shown to be "free" from German domination but ignoring that it was occupied by the Soviet Union during the partition of Poland with Nazi Germany in 1939.

Biskupski also criticizes the film for falsely claiming the Polish Air Force to be destroyed on the ground during the German invasion of Poland and contrasts it with the accurate claim of the RAF not being destroyed, which he states to be an invention of German propaganda. He notes the widespread publicization of the exploits of Polish pilots such as those of the No. 303 Squadron in Britain. Biskupski connects that portrayal with his larger theory of Hollywood's intentional poor portrayal of Poland to justify the alliance with the Soviet Union, which annexed and encroached upon Polish territory during and after the war.

== See also ==
- Propaganda in the United States
- List of Allied propaganda films of World War II

== Bibliography ==
- Biskupski, Mieczysław (2010). Hollywood's War with Poland, 1939-1945. University Press of Kentucky; Illustrated Edition. ISBN 978-0813125596. JSTOR j.ctt2jcvzz.
