= Why We Fight =

Series of films to motivate US soldiers during World War II

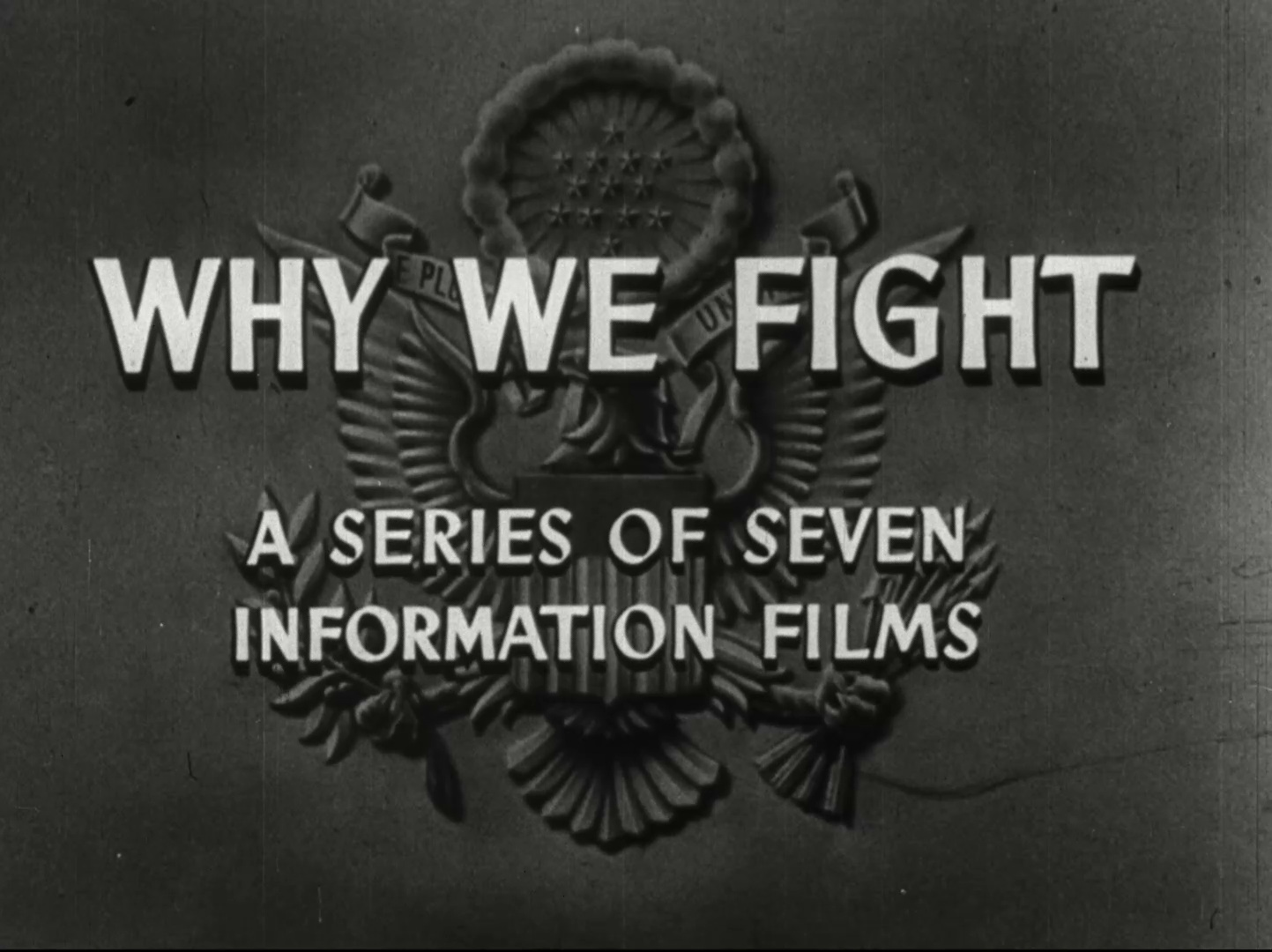
- Intertitle for the seven-film series
- Prelude to War (1942); The Nazis Strike (1943); Divide and Conquer (1943); The Battle of Britain (1943); The Battle of Russia (1943); The Battle of China (1944); War Comes to America (1945)
- Directed by: Frank Capra; Anatole Litvak
- Screenplay by: Julius J. Epstein; Philip G. Epstein; Anthony Veiller
- Produced by: Frank Capra
- Narrated by: Walter Huston; Anthony Veiller
- Cinematography: Robert J. Flaherty
- Edited by: William Hornbeck
- Music by: Alfred Newman; Dimitri Tiomkin; Howard Jackson
- Production companies: U.S. Army Pictorial Service (Note: With additional animation contributed by Walt Disney Productions); United States Army Signal Corps
- Distributed by: United States Office of War Information; War Activities Committee of the Motion Picture Industry
- Running time: 417 minutes (7 films)
- Country: United States
- Language: English

Why We Fight is a series of seven propaganda films produced by the US Department of War from 1942 to 1945, during World War II. It was originally written for American soldiers to make them support the United States' involvement in the war, but US President Franklin Roosevelt ordered distribution for public viewing.

Academy Award-winning filmmaker Frank Capra, daunted but impressed and challenged by Leni Riefenstahl's 1935 propaganda film Triumph of the Will, worked in direct response. The series faced various challenges, such as convincing a noninterventionist nation to get involved in the war and to become an ally of the Soviet Union. Many entries feature Axis powers' propaganda footage from up to 20 years earlier, recontextualized to promote the Allies.

Although primarily edited by William Hornbeck, some parts were re-enacted "under War Department supervision" if no relevant footage was available. Animated segments were produced by Walt Disney Productions, and the animated maps followed a convention of depicting Axis-occupied territory in black. In 2000, the US Library of Congress deemed the films "culturally significant" and selected them for preservation in the National Film Registry.

== Purpose ==
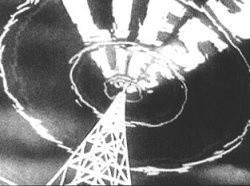
Prelude to War depicts the Nazi propaganda machine.

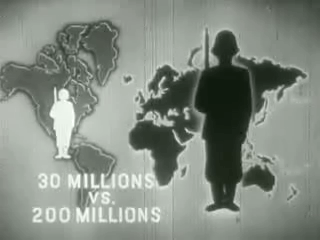
War Comes to America demonstrates North America's hopeless position in the event of an Axis victory in Afro-Eurasia.

After the Japanese attack on Pearl Harbor in December 1941 and America's subsequent joining World War II, American film director Frank Capra enlisted with the armed forces. He was already an established Hollywood director responsible for directing Academy Award-winning films such as It Happened One Night (1934) and Mr. Smith Goes to Washington (1939). He was assigned to work directly under George Marshall, the Chief of Staff of the United States Army. Marshall felt that the Signal Corps, an army branch responsible for communications, was incapable of producing "sensitive and objective troop information films". One colonel explained the importance of these future films to Capra:

You were the answer to the General's prayer. ... You see, Frank, this idea about films to explain "Why" the boys are in uniform is General Marshall's own baby, and he wants the nursery right next to his Chief of Staff's office.

During his first meeting with Marshall, Capra received his mission:

Now, Capra, I want to nail down with you a plan to make a series of documented, factual-information films—the first in our history—that will explain to our boys in the Army why we are fighting, and the principles for which we are fighting. ... You have an opportunity to contribute enormously to your country and the cause of freedom. Are you aware of that, sir?

Capra initially demurred on the grounds that he had never made a documentary before, Marshall retorted: "Capra, I have never been Chief of Staff before. Thousands of young Americans have never had their legs shot off before. Boys are commanding ships today, who a year ago had never seen the ocean before." The director apologized, and promised "the best damned documentary films ever made".

=== Countering enemy propaganda films ===
Shortly after his meeting with General Marshall, Capra viewed Leni Riefenstahl's "terrifying motion picture", Triumph of the Will. Capra describes the film as "the ominous prelude of Hitler's holocaust of hate. Satan couldn't have devised a more blood-chilling super-spectacle. ... Though panoplied with all the pomp and mystical trappings of a Wagnerian opera, its message was as blunt and brutal as a lead pipe: We, the Herrenvolk, are the new invincible gods!"

According to Capra, Triumph of the Will "fired no gun, dropped no bombs. But as a psychological weapon aimed at destroying the will to resist, it was just as lethal." Capra still had no assistants or facilities, and he began to see his assignment as overwhelming:

I sat alone and pondered. How could I mount a counterattack against Triumph of the Will; keep alive our will to resist the master race? I was alone; no studio, no equipment, no personnel.

=== Use of existing material ===
Capra made his primary focus the creation of "one basic, powerful idea" that would spread and evolve into other related ideas. He considered one important idea that had always been in his thoughts:

I thought of the Bible. There was one sentence in it that always gave me goose pimples: "Ye shall know the truth, and the truth shall make you free."

As a result, his goal became to "let the enemy prove to our soldiers the enormity of his cause—and the justness of ours." He would compile enemy speeches, films, newsreels, newspaper articles, with a list of the enemy's hostile actions. He presented his ideas to other officers who were now assigned to help him:

I told them of my hunch: Use the enemy's own films to expose their enslaving ends. Let our boys hear the Nazis and the Japs shout their own claims of master-race crud—and our fighting men will know why they are in uniform.

Weeks later, after major efforts and disappointments, Capra located hard-to-reach archives within government facilities, and by avoiding normal channels, he was able to gain access:

Peterson and I walked away on air. We had found the great cache of enemy films—and it was ours!

== Description ==
1. Prelude to War (1942; 51 min 35 s) examines the difference between democratic and fascist states and covers the Japanese invasion of Manchuria and the Italian invasion of Ethiopia. Capra describes it as "presenting a general picture of two worlds; the slave and the free, and the rise of totalitarian militarism from Japan's conquest of Manchuria to Mussolini's conquest of Ethiopia." This film won the Academy Award for Best Documentary Feature Film.
2. The Nazis Strike (1943, 40 min 20 s) covers geopolitics: the conquest of Austria, Czechoslovakia and Poland. Capra's synopsis: "Hitler rises. Imposes Nazi dictatorship on Germany. Goose-steps into Rhineland and Austria. Threatens war unless given Czechoslovakia. Appeasers oblige. Hitler invades Poland. Curtain rises on the tragedy of the century—World War II."
3. Divide and Conquer (1943, 56 min) – about the campaign in Benelux and the Fall of France. Capra's synopsis: "Hitler occupies Denmark and Norway, outflanks Maginot Line, drives British Army into North Sea, forces surrender of France."
4. The Battle of Britain (1943, 51 min 30 s) depicts Britain's victory against the Luftwaffe. Capra's synopsis: "Showing the gallant and victorious defense of Britain by Royal Air Force, at a time when shattered, but unbeaten, British were the only people fighting Nazis."
5. The Battle of Russia (1943, 76 min 7 s) Part I and Part II shows a history of Russia's defense and battle against Germany. Capra's synopsis: "History of Russia; people, size, resources, wars. Death struggle against Nazi armies at gates of Moscow and Leningrad. At Stalingrad, Nazis are put through meat grinder."
6. The Battle of China (1944, 62 min 16 s) shows Japanese aggression such as the Nanking Massacre and Chinese efforts such as the construction of the Burma Road and the Battle of Changsha. Capra's synopsis: "Japan's warlords commit total effort to conquest of China. Once conquered, Japan would use China's manpower for the conquest of all Asia."
7. War Comes to America (1945, 64 min 20 s) shows how the pattern of the Axis powers' aggression turned the American people against isolationism. Capra's synopsis: "Dealt with who, what, where, why, and how we came to be the USA—the oldest major democratic republic still living under its original constitution. But the heart of the film dealt with the depth and variety of emotions with which Americans reacted to the traumatic events in Europe and Asia. How our convictions slowly changed from total non-involvement to total commitment as we realized that loss of freedom anywhere increased the danger to our own freedom. This last film of the series was, and still is, one of the most graphic visual histories of the United States ever made."

== Production ==
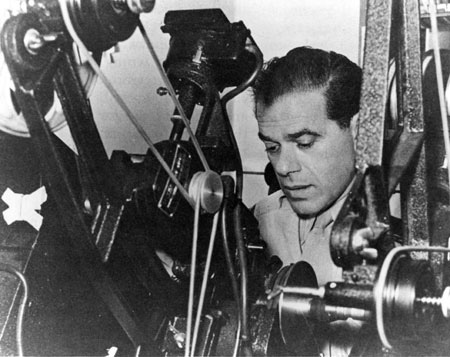
Frank Capra cutting film in 1943

Produced from 1942 to 1945, the seven installments range from 40 to 76 minutes in length, and all are available for free on DVD or online since they have always been public domain material by the US government. All are directed by Frank Capra and narrated by Walter Huston alongside radio actors Elliott Lewis, Harry von Zell, film actor Lloyd Nolan and others. The score is performed by the Army Air Force Orchestra.

The films employed a great deal of stock footage, including enemy propaganda (such as the Nazis' Triumph of the Will) recontextualized to discredit its creators. Other scenes were performed. Animation was produced by Disney Studios. The quotation ending each film ("The victory of the democracies can only be complete with the utter defeat of the war machines of Germany and Japan") is from the Army Chief of Staff George Marshall.

== Accuracy ==
Prelude to War and The Battle of China refer to the Tanaka Memorial several times by portraying it as "Japan's Mein Kampf" in order to raise US morale for a protracted war against Japan. The authenticity of that document is not accepted by scholars today, and it is regarded as an anti-Japanese hoax, but the Tanaka Memorial was widely accepted as authentic in the 1930s and the 1940s because Japanese actions corresponded so closely to its plans.

To justify the Western Allies' help to the Soviet Union, the series omitted many facts which could have cast the Soviets in a negative light, such as the Soviet occupation of the Baltic States and the Winter War. However, it shows the Molotov–Ribbentrop Pact being signed and the Soviet invasion of Poland.

== Impact ==
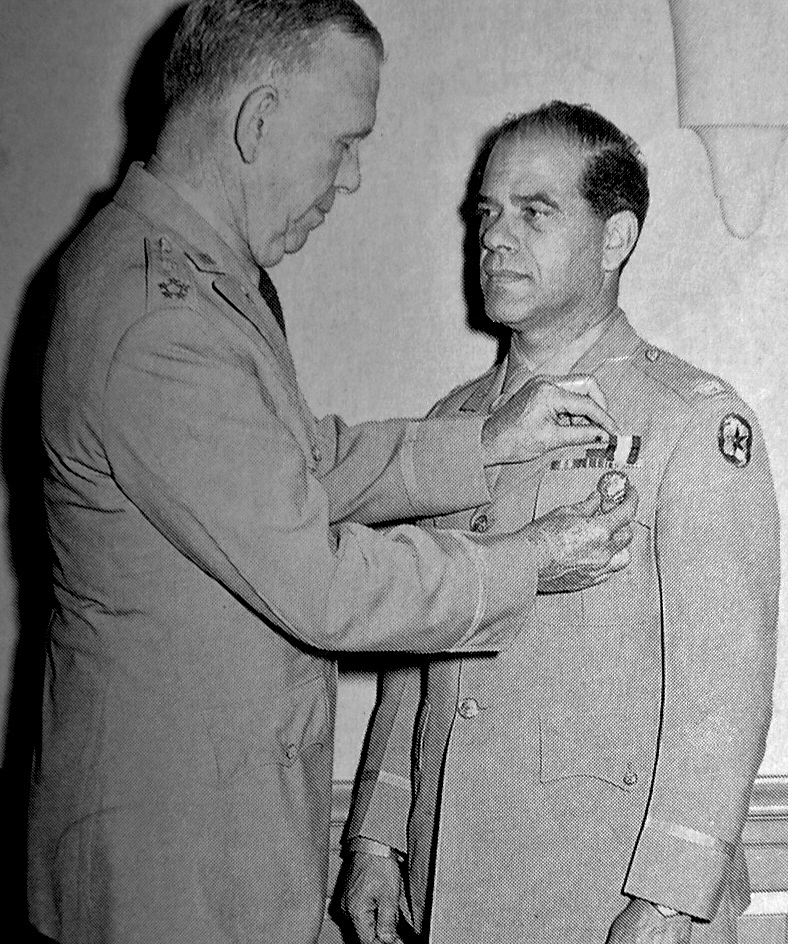
Frank Capra receiving the Distinguished Service Medal from U.S. Army Chief of Staff General George C. Marshall, 1945

After World War I, methods used to gain support from troops and civilians needed to change. Giving speeches to soldier recruits and to the US public was no longer effective. Film became the medium of choice to persuade US soldiers and recruits on why fighting was necessary. As Kathleen German stated, "this was the first massive attempt to influence opinion in the U.S. military" through film. Film was also chosen because it combined the senses of sight and hearing, which gives it an advantage over radio or print. Capra, who had no experience in documentary films, was chosen because "of his commitment to American ideals" and because of the popularity of some of his earlier feature films. He was thought "to understand the heart and soul of American audiences". Once the documentary series was completed, it was said to contain the "Capra touch".

The series's appeal was furthered by its editing. "Throughout his career, Capra depended upon his skill as an editor to achieve the contrast of the individual and the group, critical in the success of his Hollywood movies." Capra thought that it would be most effective to use the enemy's original film and propaganda in the series to expose the enemies with their own images. By taking pieces of the enemy material to edit together and placing his own narration over the results, Capra gave meaning and purpose to the war with added narrative. That "parallel editing" created an "us vs. them" image by re-framing and showing clips out of their original order and context.

By such careful editing, the films compare and contrast the forces of evil with the U.S. and its traditional values. Capra highlighted the differences between the US and the enemy and showed how the enemy would attack these values if "we" did not fight. That worked to create a battle not only between Allies and the Axis powers but also between good and evil. Capra treated it as a matter of showing the enormity of the Axis and the justness of the Allies.

The Why We Fight series became a heavily used means of presenting information about Axis powers for the American government during WWII. General Surles, director of the Department of War's Bureau of Public Relations, had hoped that the series would be effective enough to allow similar kinds of army films to be shown to the general public. Surles saw that goal to be realized when US President Franklin Roosevelt watched Prelude to War, the most successful of the seven. Roosevelt considered it so important that he ordered its distribution in civilian arenas for public viewing. However, some objections were raised against the series due to its persuasiveness. Lowell Mellett, coordinator of government films and aide to Roosevelt, saw the films as dangerous. He was most concerned with the effect that the series would have after the war was over and the "hysteria" that it would create in its wake. At least 54 million Americans had seen the series by the end of the war, and studies were done to gauge the impact of the films. However, results were inconclusive, and so the effectiveness of the series is still disputed.

== Legacy ==
Created by the US Army Pictorial Services, the films are in the public domain, and all of them are available for download on the Internet Archive.

== List of films ==
Prelude to War

The Nazis Strike

Divide and Conquer

The Battle of Britain

The Battle of Russia

The Battle of China

War Comes to America

== Other Capra World War II films ==
Capra was involved in a number of other World War II propaganda films that were not part of the Why We Fight series. He directed or co-directed the following films:

- Tunisian Victory (1944, 75 minutes) – co-directed with John Huston, Anthony Veiller, Hugh Stewart and Roy Boulting
- Know Your Enemy: Japan (1945, 63 minutes) – co-directed by Joris Ivens
- Here Is Germany (1945, 52 minutes)
- Two Down and One to Go (1945, 32 minutes)

Capra also produced the 43-minute film The Negro Soldier (1944), directed by Stuart Heisler, and the 42-minute film Know Your Ally: Britain (1944), directed by Robert Stevenson and Anthony Veiller.

Capra also directed, uncredited, the 13-minute 1945 military training film Your Job in Germany, written by Dr. Seuss.

== See also ==
- List of Allied propaganda films of World War II
- List of films in the public domain in the United States
- Propaganda in the United States
- War films
