= War Comes to America =

1945 film by Frank Capra, Anatole Litvak

- Film
- Directed by: Frank Capra; Anatole Litvak
- Written by: Julius J. Epstein; Philip G. Epstein; Emma Lazarus; Anthony Veiller
- Produced by: Frank Capra
- Narrated by: Walter Huston; Lloyd Nolan
- Edited by: William Hornbeck
- Music by: Alfred Newman
- Distributed by: U.S. Army Pictorial Services
- Release date: June 14, 1945
- Running time: 65 minutes
- Country: United States
- Language: English

War Comes to America is the seventh and final film of Frank Capra's Why We Fight World War II propaganda film series.

== Synopsis ==
The early part of the film is an idealized version of American history, which mentions the first settlements, the American Revolutionary War (omitting the American Civil War), and the ethnic diversity of America. It lists 22 immigrant nationalities, 19 of them European and uses the then-current terms "Negro," "Jap," and "Chinaman." This section of the film concludes with a lengthy paean to American inventiveness, economic abundance, and social ideals.

The run-up to World War II is then described beginning in 1931 with the Japanese invasion of Manchuria. The film examines how American public opinion gradually changed from one of isolationism to one of support for the Allied cause and demonstrates this using a series of Gallup polls.

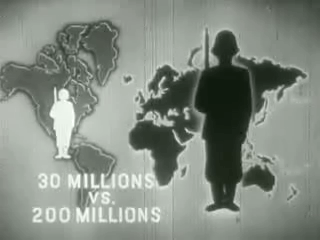
War Comes To America demonstrates North and South America's hopeless position in the event of an Axis victory in Afro-Eurasia.

In 1936, public opinion is firmly isolationist, with 95% of Americans answering NO to the question "If another world war develops in Europe, should America take part again?" Congress responded with an arms embargo and a "Cash and carry rule" when trading with belligerents in raw materials.

In September 1937, the question "In the current fight between Japan and China, are your sympathies with either side?" is answered CHINA 43%, JAPAN 2%, UNDECIDED 55%, but in June 1939, the same question gives a 74% vote for China. Anti-Japanese sentiment thus forced the US government to block trade in oil and scrap iron with Japan.

In October 1939, 82% of Americans blame Germany for starting the war in Europe, but in January 1941, after the Fall of France and the founding of the Tripartite Pact, which is clearly aimed against the United States, the question "Should we keep out of war, or aid Britain, even at the risk of war?" has AID BRITAIN get 68% of the vote. That increase in pro-Allied sentiment triggers Lend Lease aid to the United Kingdom (and to the Soviet Union after it had been attacked by Germany).

This film also talks about the 1940 Havana Conference

Towards the end, the film argues in detail (to a backdrop of animated maps and diagrams) that American involvement in the war is essential in terms of self-defense. The dire consequences for the United States of an Axis victory in Afro-Eurasia are spelled out:

German conquest of Europe and Africa would bring all their raw materials, plus their entire industrial development, under one control. Of the 2 billion people in the world, the Nazis would rule roughly one quarter – the 500 million people of Europe and Africa, forced into slavery to labor for Germany. German conquest of Russia would add the vast raw materials and the production facilities of another of the world's industrial areas, and of the world's people another 200 million would be added to the Nazi labor pile.

Japanese conquest of the Orient would pour into their factory the almost unlimited resources of that area, and of the peoples of the earth, a thousand million would come under their rule, slaves for their industrial machine.

We in North and South America would be left with the raw materials of 3/10 of the Earth's surface, against the Axis with the resources of 7/10. We would have one industrial region against their three industrial regions. We would have 1/8 of the world's population against their 7/8. If we together with the other nations of North and South America, could mobilize 30 million fully-equipped men, the Axis could mobilize 200 million.

Thus, an Axis victory in Europe and Asia would leave us alone and virtually surrounded, facing enemies ten times stronger than ourselves..

The film ends with the attack on Pearl Harbor by showing the Japanese negotiators in Washington, led by Saburo Kurusu, still negotiating with the Americans while the attack takes place in Hawaii. That is "the straw that broke the camel's back" that causes the United States to enter the war.

== See also ==
- Propaganda in the United States
