= Anthony Veiller =

American screenwriter (1903–1965)

- Born: June 23, 1903; New York, New York, U.S.
- Died: June 27, 1965 (aged 62); Los Angeles, California, U.S.
- Resting place: St. Mary Churchyard, Bepton, West Sussex, England
- Occupations: Screenwriter; film producer
- Years active: 1934–1964
- Parent(s): Bayard Veiller; Margaret Wycherly

Anthony Veiller (23 June 1903 – 27 June 1965) was an American screenwriter and film producer, who wrote for 41 films between 1934 and 1964. He was twice nominated for the Academy Award for Best Adapted Screenplay, for Stage Door (1937) and The Killers (1946).

== Early life and education ==
Veiller was born on 23 June 1903 in New York City to playwright and screenwriter Bayard Veiller and English-born actress Margaret Wycherly. He studied at Antioch College and Union College, before moving to Hollywood in 1930.

== Career ==
Veiller was twice nominated for an Academy Award for Best Screenplay. In 1937, he co-wrote (with Morrie Ryskind) the screenplay for Stage Door, starring Katharine Hepburn, Ginger Rogers and Adolphe Menjou. This loose adaptation of the play by George S. Kaufman and Edna Ferber was also nominated for the Academy Award for Best Picture.

Veiller was also Oscar-nominated for writing (with uncredited help from John Huston and Richard Brooks) The Killers (1946), an adaptation of the short story by Ernest Hemingway. The film introduced Burt Lancaster to filmgoers, and won an Edgar Award as best mystery film of 1946. In 2008, it was included in the United States National Film Registry by the Library of Congress.

During the Second World War he worked with Frank Capra on several films in the documentary/propaganda film series collectively titled Why We Fight. In 1946 (the same year as The Killers), Veiller co-wrote The Stranger, directed by and starring Orson Welles. For State of the Union (1948), again directed by Capra, Veiller was credited as co-producer as well as co-writer. Veiller worked with director John Huston on several films: Moulin Rouge (1952), Beat the Devil (1953), The List of Adrian Messenger (1963), and The Night of the Iguana (1964), the film of the Tennessee Williams play that became Veiller's final screen credit.

== Death ==
Veiller died on 27 June 1965 of cancer in Hollywood, California.

== Filmography ==
- The Witching Hour (1934) - screenplay, producer
- Menace (1934) - screenplay
- The Notorious Sophie Lang (1934) - screenplay
- Break of Hearts (1935) - screenplay
- Star of Midnight (1935) - screenplay
- College Scandal (1935) - uncredited writer
- Jalna (1935) - screenplay
- Seven Keys to Baldpate (1935) - screenplay
- The Lady Consents (1936) - screenplay
- The Ex-Mrs. Bradford (1936) - screenplay
- Swing Time (1936) - uncredited writer
- A Woman Rebels (1936) - screenplay
- Winterset (1936) - screenplay
- The Soldier and the Lady (1937) - screenplay
- Stage Door (1937) - screenplay
- Radio City Revels (1938) - screenplay
- The Saint in New York (1938) - screenplay
- Gunga Din (1939) - uncredited writer
- Let Us Live (1939) - screenplay
- Disputed Passage (1939) - screenplay
- Typhoon (1940) - producer
- Safari (1940) - producer
- The Quarterback (1940) - producer
- Moon Over Burma (1940) - producer
- Victory (1940) - producer
- New York Town (1941) - producer
- Her Cardboard Lover (1942) - screenplay
- Why We Fight: Prelude to War (1942) (documentary) - uncredited writer
- Why We Fight: The Battle of Russia (1943) (documentary) - uncredited writer, narrator
- Why We Fight: The Nazis Strike (1943) (documentary) - uncredited writer, narrator
- Why We Fight: The Battle of Britain (1943) (documentary) - uncredited director, narrator
- Assignment in Brittany (1943) - screenplay
- Know Your Ally: Britain (1944) (documentary) - uncredited director
- Tunisian Victory (documentary) (1944) - uncredited writer
- Adventure (1945) - screenplay
- War Comes to America (1945) (documentary) - uncredited writer
- Two Down and One to Go (1945) (documentary) - screenplay
- Here is Germany (1945) (documentary) - uncredited writer, narrator
- The Stranger (1946) - screenplay
- The Killers (1946) - screenplay
- State of the Union (1948) - screenplay, associate producer
- Colorado Territory (1949) - producer
- Backfire (1950) - producer
- Chain Lightning (1950) - producer
- Dallas (1950) - producer
- Along the Great Divide (1951) - producer
- Fort Worth (1951) - producer
- Force of Arms (1951) - producer
- Red Planet Mars (1952) - screenplay, producer
- Moulin Rouge (1952) - screenplay
- Beat the Devil (1953) - uncredited writer
- That Lady (1955) - screenplay
- Safari (1956) - screenplay
- Monkey on My Back (1957) - screenplay
- The Adventures of Tugboat Annie (1958) (TV series) - executive producer
- Solomon and Sheba (1959) - screenplay
- Timbuktu (1959) - screenplay
- Markham (1960) (TV series) writer of episodes
- The List of Adrian Messenger (1963) - screenplay
- The Night of the Iguana (1964) - screenplay

== Awards and nominations ==
Award	Year	Category	Work	Result
Academy Award	1938	Best Adapted Screenplay	Stage Door	Nominated
Academy Award	1947	Best Adapted Screenplay	The Killers	Nominated
Edgar Award	1947	Best Motion Picture Screenplay	The Killers	Nominated
Edgar Award	1964	Best Motion Picture Screenplay	The List of Adrian Messenger	Nominated
Writers Guild of America Award	1953	Best Written American Drama	Moulin Rouge	Nominated
Writers Guild of America Award	1965	Best Written American Drama	The Night of the Iguana	Nominated
