= The Killers (1946 film) =

1946 film noir directed by Robert Siodmak

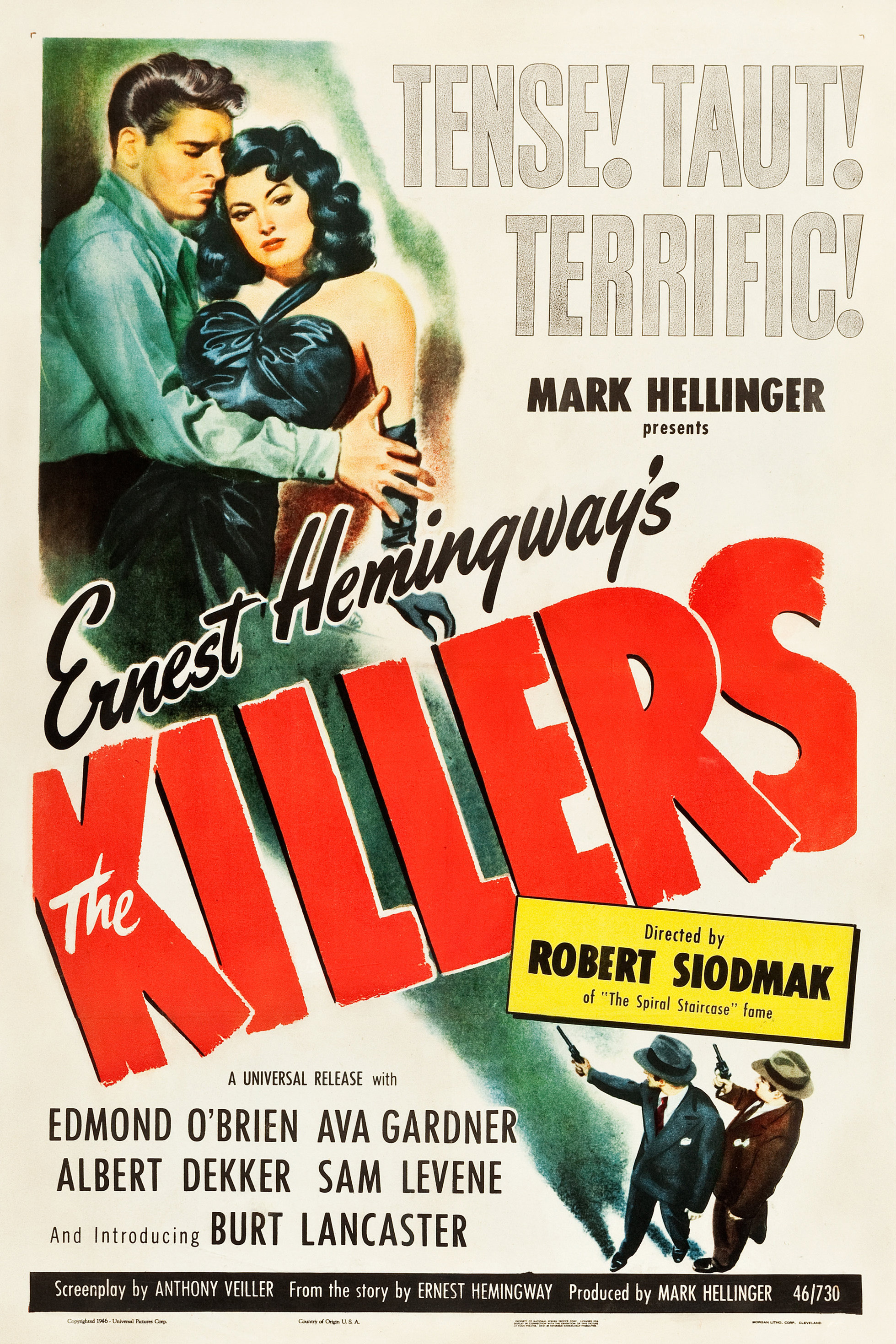
- Theatrical release poster
- Directed by: Robert Siodmak
- Screenplay by: Anthony Veiller (Note: Though Veiller is the credited screenwriter, Richard Brooks and John Huston served as uncredited co-writers.)
- Based on: "The Killers" (1927 short story) by Ernest Hemingway
- Produced by: Mark Hellinger
- Starring: Edmond O'Brien; Ava Gardner; Albert Dekker; Sam Levene; Burt Lancaster
- Cinematography: Woody Bredell
- Edited by: Arthur Hilton
- Music by: Miklós Rózsa
- Production company: Mark Hellinger Productions
- Distributed by: Universal Pictures
- Release date: August 30, 1946
- Running time: 103 minutes
- Country: United States
- Language: English
- Box office: $2.5 million (US rentals)

The Killers is a 1946 American film noir directed by Robert Siodmak and starring Burt Lancaster in his film debut, along with Ava Gardner, Edmond O'Brien and Sam Levene. Based in part on the 1927 short story of the same name by Ernest Hemingway, it focuses on insurance detective Jim Riordan's investigation into the execution by Al and Max, two professional killers, of former boxer Pete Lund, who did not resist his own murder. The screenplay was written by Anthony Veiller, with uncredited contributions by John Huston and Richard Brooks.

Released in August 1946, The Killers was a critical and commercial success, earning four Academy Award nominations, including for Best Director and Best Adapted Screenplay. Hemingway, who was habitually disgusted with how Hollywood distorted his thematic intentions, was an open admirer of the film. It is widely regarded as one of the classics of the film noir genre.

In 2008, The Killers was selected for preservation in the United States National Film Registry by the Library of Congress as being "culturally, historically, or aesthetically significant".

== Plot ==
In 1946, professional hitmen Al and Max arrive in Brentwood, New Jersey, to kill Pete Lund, a gas pump attendant known as "The Swede". After being confronted by the pair in a diner, Lund's coworker, Nick Adams, warns him. A despondent Lund makes no attempt to flee and is shot dead in his room.

Jim Riordan, a life insurance investigator, is assigned to find and pay the beneficiary of the Swede's $2,500 policy. Tracking down and interviewing the dead man's friends and associates, Riordan doggedly pieces together his story, working closely with Philadelphia police Lieutenant Sam Lubinsky, a friend of the Swede's since childhood.

In flashback, the Swede is revealed to be a former boxer and hoodlum named Ole Anderson. After a career-ending hand injury, he rejects Lubinsky's suggestion to join the police force and becomes involved with crime boss "Big Jim" Colfax. He falls for the glamorous Kitty Collins, dropping his plain and loyal girlfriend Lilly Harmon. When Lubinsky, now married to Lilly, catches Kitty wearing stolen jewelry, the Swede confesses to the crime, slugs him, and flees, leading to three years in prison.

After completing his sentence, the Swede, "Dum-Dum" Clarke, and "Blinky" Franklin are recruited for a payroll robbery in Hackensack, New Jersey by Colfax, whose relationship with Kitty creates tensions between him and the Swede. The robbery nets the gang $254,912. When their safe house burns down, everyone but the Swede is notified of a new rendezvous. Kitty tells the Swede that the gang plans to double-cross him, inciting him to take all of the money at gunpoint and run. Kitty meets with him later in Atlantic City, then disappears with the haul herself, leaving the Swede heartbroken.

In the present, Riordan stakes out the Swede's old room in Brentwood. Dum-Dum sneaks in to search for the loot and Riordan confronts him, but he flees before he can be arrested. Riordan subsequently learns that the safe house fire occurred hours after it was alleged to have, and finally begins to solve the puzzle.

Riordan visits Colfax, now a successful building contractor in Pittsburgh, but Colfax claims no knowledge of Kitty's whereabouts. A short time later, Kitty sets up a meeting with Riordan at a nightclub. She claims she convinced the Swede to hold up his double-crossers to get the money to rescue her from Colfax. She admits having swiped it and run in Atlantic City and, believing that Riordan has enough evidence against her, agrees to offer Colfax as a fall guy. She later excuses herself and slips out of the bathroom window, while Al and Max arrive at the nightclub to kill Riordan. Anticipating such a confrontation, Riordan and Lubinsky manage to slay the pair.

Riordan and Lubinsky pick up a police escort and head to Colfax's mansion. They arrive to find Dum-Dum and Colfax mortally wounding each other in a shootout. Colfax admits that he had the Swede killed because the Swede—or the other gang members, should they run into the Swede like he did—might eventually realize that he and Kitty, now a married couple, had planned the robbery with the intent to double-cross everyone. A desperate Kitty begs Colfax to exonerate her in a deathbed confession, but he is too far gone.

== Cast ==
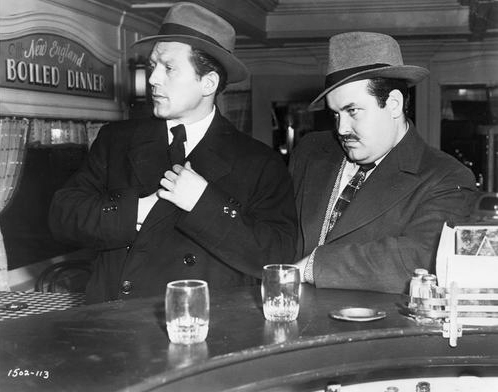
The killers (Charles McGraw, William Conrad)

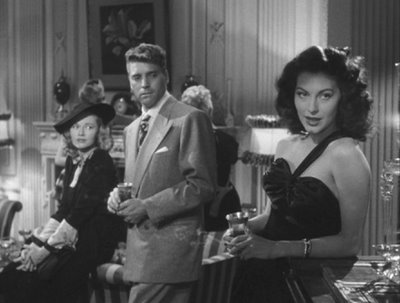
Lilly (Virginia Christine), the Swede (Burt Lancaster) and Kitty (Ava Gardner)

- Burt Lancaster as Pete Lund/Ole "Swede" Anderson
- Ava Gardner as Kitty Collins
- Edmond O'Brien as James "Jim" Riordan
- Albert Dekker as "Big Jim" Colfax
- Sam Levene as Lt. Sam Lubinsky
- Vince Barnett as Charleston
- Virginia Christine as Lilly Harmon Lubinsky
- Jack Lambert as "Dum-Dum" Clarke
- Charles D. Brown as Packy Robinson
- Donald MacBride as R.S. Kenyon, Riordan's boss
- Charles McGraw as Al
- William Conrad as Max
- Phil Brown as Nick Adams
- Jeff Corey as "Blinky" Franklin
- Harry Hayden as George
- Bill Walker as Sam
- Queenie Smith as Mary Ellen Daugherty
- Beatrice Roberts as Nurse
- John Miljan as Jake the Rake
- Vera Lewis as Ma Hirsch
- Garry Owen as Joe Smalley

== Production ==
=== Development ===
Trailer for The Killers

The first 12 minutes of the film, showing the arrival of the two contract killers Al (Charles McGraw) and Max (William Conrad) and the murder of Ole "Swede" Anderson (Burt Lancaster), is a close adaptation of Ernest Hemingway's 1927 short story in Scribner's Magazine. The rest of the film, showing Jim Riordan (Edmond O'Brien)'s investigation of the murder, is wholly original.

Producer Mark Hellinger paid $36,750 for the screen rights to Hemingway's story, his first independent production. The initial screenplay was rewritten by Richard Brooks, then a contracted story writer for Hellinger, and then heavily re-worked by Anthony Veiller and his frequent collaborator John Huston. Only Veiller is credited on the final film, Huston went uncredited due to his contract with Warner Bros.

Robert Siodmak later said Hellinger's newspaper background meant he "always insisted on each scene ending with a punchline and every character being overestablished with a telling remark" which the director fought against.

=== Casting ===
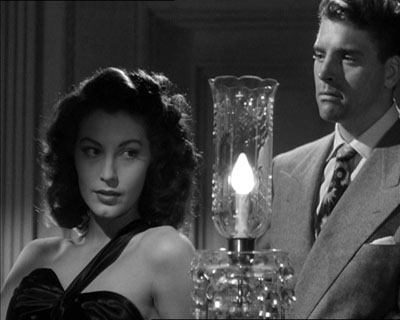
Ava Gardner and Burt Lancaster

Reportedly, Hellinger was looking to cast two or three unknowns on the theory that the known actors of the time were already so typed that the audience would know the threats instantly which would take away some of the suspense of the story. He later said that Lancaster was not his first pick for the part of the Swede, but Warner Bros. would not lend Wayne Morris for the film. Other actors considered for the part include Van Heflin, Jon Hall, Sonny Tufts, and Edmond O'Brien, who was cast in the role of the insurance investigator Riordan. Hellinger quipped that he tested so many potential "Swedes" that if somebody had suggested Greta Garbo, he would have tested her too. Lancaster was under contract to producer Hal B. Wallis but had not yet appeared in a film. Wallis's assistant Martin Jurow told Hellinger about the then-unknown "big brawny bird" who might be suitable for the role, and Hellinger set up a meeting. After his screen test, Hellinger signed a contract with Lancaster to do one film per year and cast him in the role that made him a star.

In the role of the femme fatale Kitty Collins, Hellinger cast Ava Gardner, who had appeared virtually unnoticed in a string of minor films under contract to MGM. Gardner had difficulty achieving the requisite histrionics necessary at the end of the film when Sam Lubinsky (Sam Levene) memorably tells Kitty "Don't ask a dying man to lie his soul into Hell." Director Siodmak felt she did not have the necessary technique to reach the emotional climax necessary for the scene so he chose to "bully her" into Kitty's fragile emotional state by "barking at her if she did not do the scene right, he would hit her."

== Release ==
=== Critical response ===
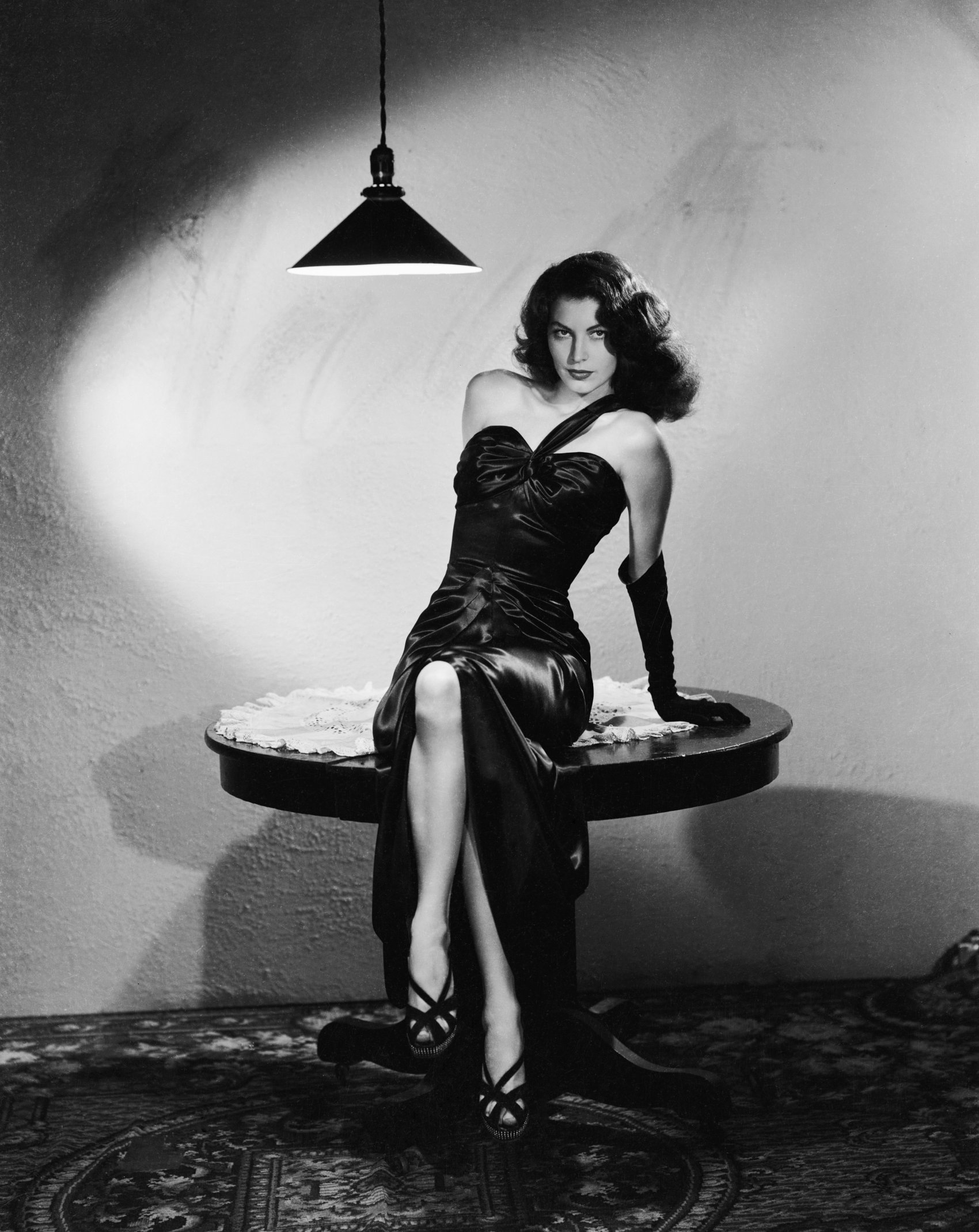
Ava Gardner in The Killers (1946)

Contemporary critical response was mixed. Bosley Crowther of The New York Times gave it a positive review and lauded the acting. He wrote "With Robert Siodmak's restrained direction, a new actor, Burt Lancaster, gives a lanky and wistful imitation of a nice guy who's wooed to his ruin. And Ava Gardner is sultry and sardonic as the lady who crosses him up. Edmond O'Brien plays the shrewd investigator in the usual cool and clipped detective style, Sam Levene is very good as a policeman and Albert Dekker makes a thoroughly nasty thug...The tempo is slow and metronomic, which makes for less excitement than suspense." In The Nation in 1946, critic James Agee wrote, "The story is well presented, but Hemingway's talk ... sounds, on the screen, as cooked-up and formal as an eclogue ... There is a good strident journalistic feeling for tension, noise, sentiment, and jazzed-up realism, all well manipulated by Robert Siodmak, which is probably chiefly to the credit of the producer, Mark Hellinger. There is nothing unique or even valuable about the picture, but energy combined with attention to form and detail doesn't turn up every day; neither does good entertainment."

In a 2003 review of the DVD release, Scott Tobias, while critical of the screenplay, described the noir style, writing "Lifted note-for-note from the Hemingway story, the classic opening scene of Siodmak's film sings with the high tension, sharp dialogue, and grim humor that's conspicuously absent from the rest of Anthony Veiller's mediocre screenplay...A lean block of muscles and little else, Burt Lancaster stars as the hapless victim, an ex-boxer who was unwittingly roped into the criminal underworld and the even more dangerous gaze of Ava Gardner, a memorably sultry and duplicitous femme fatale...[Siodmak] sustains a fatalistic tone with the atmospheric touches that define noir, favoring stark lighting effects that throw his post-war world into shadow."

The film was considered a great commercial success and launched Lancaster and Gardner to stardom. Eddie Muller listed it as one of his Top 25 Noir Films: "Hemingway's short story is fleshed out into an incredibly involuted screenplay, which Siodmak renders as the ultimate noir dreamscape. The Citizen Kane of crime movies."

Rotten Tomatoes reports an approval rating of 97%, based on 35 reviews, with a weighted average of 8.6/10.

=== Accolades ===
Wins

- Edgar Award: Edgar; from the Mystery Writers of America for Best Motion Picture Screenplay, Anthony Veiller (writer), Mark Hellinger (producer), and Robert Siodmak (director); 1947.

Nominations—1947 Academy Awards

- Best Director: Robert Siodmak.
- Best Film Editing: Arthur Hilton.
- Best Music, Scoring of a Dramatic Picture: Miklós Rózsa.
- Best Adapted Screenplay: Anthony Veiller.

American Film Institute Lists

- AFI's 100 Years...100 Thrills - Nominated
- AFI's 10 Top 10 - Nominated Gangster Film

== Adaptations ==
The Killers was dramatized as a half-hour radio play on the June 5, 1949, broadcast of Screen Directors Playhouse, starring Burt Lancaster, Shelley Winters and William Conrad.

In 1956, director Andrei Tarkovsky, then a film student, created a 19-minute short based on the story which is featured on The Criterion Collection's release of the DVD.

The film was adapted in 1964, using the same title but with an updated plot where the two hitmen, Charlie Strom (Lee Marvin) and Lee (Clu Gulager), are actually the protagonists. Intended to be broadcast as a television film, it was directed by Don Siegel, and featured Angie Dickinson, John Cassavetes and Ronald Reagan, who, as gang leader Jack Browning, famously slaps Dickinson's character Sheila Farr across the face. Siegel's film was deemed too violent for the small screen and was released theatrically, first in Europe, then years later in America.

Scenes from The Killers were used in the Carl Reiner spoof Dead Men Don't Wear Plaid (1982) starring Steve Martin.

Seven screenwriter Andrew Kevin Walker announced in 2016 that he has written a screenplay for a new adaptation of The Killers.

== Legacy ==
The Killers has come to be regarded as a classic in the years since its release, and in 2008, was selected for preservation in the United States National Film Registry by the Library of Congress as being "culturally, historically, or aesthetically significant." Critic Jonathan Lethem described the film in a 2003 essay as the "Citizen Kane of [film] noir."

According to Hemingway biographer Carlos Baker, The Killers "was the first film from any of his works that Ernest could genuinely admire." Commenting on the film, Hemingway said: "It is a good picture and the only good picture ever made of a story of mine."

In July 2018, it was selected to be screened in the Venice Classics section at the 75th Venice International Film Festival.

Has been shown on the Turner Classic Movies show 'Noir Alley' with Eddie Muller.

== See also ==
- The Killers (1956)
- The Killers (1964)
- Pulp Fiction (1994)
