= The Nazis Strike =

1943 American film

- Film (Hitler at the Kroll Opera House)
- Directed by: Frank Capra; Anatole Litvak
- Written by: Julius Epstein; Philip Epstein
- Produced by: Frank Capra
- Narrated by: Walter Huston
- Cinematography: Robert Flaherty
- Edited by: William Hornbeck
- Music by: Uncredited: Anthony Collins; Louis Gruenberg; Leigh Harline; John Leipold; Dimitri Tiomkin; Roy Webb
- Production company: Office of War Information
- Distributed by: War Activities Committee of the Motion Pictures Industry
- Release date: 1943
- Running time: 41 minutes
- Country: United States
- Language: English

The Nazis Strike is the second film of Frank Capra's Why We Fight propaganda film series. Released in 1943, it introduces Germany as a nation whose aggressive ambitions began in 1863 with Otto von Bismarck and the Nazis as its latest incarnation.

== Heartland Theory ==
Hitler's plan for world domination is described in terms of Halford Mackinder's Heartland Theory, which starts about three minutes into the film:

In the Middle Ages a plague of slavery descended on the world. From the wilds of Mongolia rode a mighty army of fierce horsemen, led by Genghis Khan. Burning, looting, pillaging... the barbarian horde swept across Asia and Eastern Europe. Genghis Khan controlled most of the world of the thirteenth century. Adolf Hitler was determined to outdo him, and conquer all the world of the twentieth century.

Set up at Munich was an institute devoted to the little-known science of geopolitics, vaguely defined as "the military control of space". Germany's leading geopolitician, a former general, Karl Haushofer, was head man. He has gathered together more information about your home town than you yourself know.

To the German geopolitician, the world is not made up of men and women and children, who live and love and dream of better things. It is made up of only two elements – labor and raw materials. The geopoliticians' job was to transform Hitler's ambition to control these elements into cold, hard reality.

On their map our planet is neatly divided into land and water. Water forms three quarters of the Earth's surface, land only one quarter. And in that one quarter of the Earth's surface lies the world's wealth, all its natural resources – and the world's manpower.

Control the land and you control the world – that was Hitler's theory. This all-important "land" the geopoliticians now break up into two areas – one the Western Hemisphere, which together with Australia and all the islands of the world including Japan, comprises one third of the total land area. The other area, which consists of Europe, Asia, and Africa, makes up the other two thirds. This supercontinent, which they call the "World Island", is not only twice as large as the rest of the land area, but also includes seven eighths of the world's population.

The heart of this "World Island" comprises Eastern Europe and most of Asia. This they call the "Heartland", which just about coincides with the old empire of Genghis Khan.

Hitler's step-by-step plan for world conquest can be summarized this way:

Conquer Eastern Europe and you dominate the Heartland.
Conquer the Heartland and you dominate the World Island.
Conquer the World Island... and you dominate the World.

That was the dream in Hitler's mind as he stood at Nuremberg.

== Fifth column activity ==
The next focus of the film is the "softening-up" of the Western democracies by using fascist organizations such as the Belgian Rexists, the French Cross of Fire, the Sudeten German National Socialist Party of Konrad Henlein, the British Union of Fascists, and the German American Bund. Meanwhile, in Germany, the Nazis are beginning an enormous process of rearmament.

Germany then begins its territorial expansion with the first target being Austria, Hitler's "full-scale invasion test." He then uses his Sudeten "stooges" under Henlein to "soften up" Czechoslovakia and to annex the Sudetenland with the help of a Britain and France, which are desperate to avoid war. Hitler's use of the concept of self-determination as a justification for these annexations is ridiculed by reference to prominent German Americans thoroughly loyal to the Allied cause, such as Admiral Chester Nimitz, Henry J. Kaiser, Wendell Willkie and Senator Robert Wagner.

== Invasion of Poland ==
The film concludes with the Invasion of Poland, which is depicted with many inaccuracies.

The extreme disparity between the two sides is emphasized. The Germans have 5,000 modern tanks against Poland's 600 obsolete models, and the Luftwaffe has 6,000 modern monoplanes against less than 1,000 aircraft of the Polish Air Force, many of which are outdated biplanes. Animation is also used that graphically shows how Polish army units were encircled and destroyed. The film suggests most of the Polish Air Force to be destroyed on the ground and the Polish Army to rely heavily on mounted cavalry (see Tuchola Forest myth)

That suggests that its makers learned the details of the Polish campaign largely from Nazi propaganda in which both false claims were often made. The stubborn resistance of Polish forces in the Hel Peninsula is recognized, as are the widespread Nazi atrocities after the Polish defeat.

Overall, the movie gives the false impression that Polish Army to be ineffective and even pathetic and to do no damage to the Germans. The film also alleged widespread collaboration with the invading Germans but does not specify from whom.

The Germans are forced to stop at the Bug River, where they meet the advancing Red Army. The film misrepresents the German-Soviet Pact by claiming that the pact was signed only after the West had turned down Soviet requests to ally against the Germans and that overall, "it didn't make any sense." Since the film was made while the Soviets were allied to the Western Allies against the Germans, the film repeats Soviet propaganda, justifying the Soviet invasion of Poland by the Soviet need to obtain a buffer zone against a further Nazi advance to the east and implies that the Soviets entered Poland to stop Hitler. The film makes no mentions of the Soviet battles against the Polish border forces or that the Soviets broke their own non-aggression pact with Poland, nor of Soviet atrocities against Poland.

"...every trace of Hitler's footsteps...will be expunged, purged, and if need be, BLASTED from the surface of the earth."

The film then notes that Hitler turns west to finish off Britain and France, which have declared war on Nazi Germany, rather than risk a two-front war, which leads to the third part of the installment dealing with the German invasion of Western Europe. The film concludes with the quote by Winston Churchill from his speech to the Allied delegates in 1941:

"What tragedies, what horrors, what crimes has Hitler and all that Hitler stands for brought upon Europe and the world! it is upon this foundation that Hitler [...] pretends to build out of hatred [....] a new order for Europe. But nothing is more certain than that every trace of Hitler's footsteps, every stain of his infected, and corroding fingers will be expunged, purged, and if need be, BLASTED from the surface of the earth. Lift up your hearts, all will come right. Out of depths of sorrow and sacrifice will be born again the glory of mankind."

== Criticism ==
Polish-American historian Mieczysław B. Biskupski gave a harsh review, calling it "a conglomeration of patriotic exhortation, crackpot geopolitical theorizing, and historical mischief making." Noting that the film was more than inaccurate but an intentional attempt to falsify certain facts about the war, particularly by misportraying the Soviets, it casts the Poles in the role of failure and the Soviets in the role of guiltless saviors to serve a clear ideological role of justifying the Anglo-American alliance with the Soviet Union.

== See also ==
- Propaganda in the United States
- Sonderweg
- Western betrayal
