= Know Your Ally: Britain =

- film
- Produced by: United States War Department and Signal Corps
- Narrated by: Walter Huston
- Release date: 1944
- Running time: 42 minutes
- Country: United States
- Language: English

Know Your Ally: Britain is a 42-minute propaganda film made in 1944. It was narrated by Walter Huston and produced by the United States War Department and Signal Corps to solidify Anglo-American solidarity within the ranks as well as counter Nazi propaganda aimed at weakening the Alliance.

== Synopsis ==
The film opens with a shot of a football team making a touchdown and the crowd cheering. The narration begins, informing us that that victory was won by a team where everyone knew the job they had to do: "We're playing another kind of a game now, only this one isn't for fun. It's for keeps." the narrator declares, with shots of a tank battle now on screen. British life and society are briefly introduced. The narrator notes especially the high population density of Britain and the solidarity that this inspires between various elements of its society.

Here's where he lives – a little island no larger than the state of Idaho. Half a million people live in Idaho. 96 times that number live in Britain. The Nazis and the Japs scream about Lebensraum – "living space" – but on a square mile of Britain there are more people than on a square mile of Germany or Italy or Japan.

In 1938, the year the Yankees won the pennant, the British were going about their daily lives, working and cheering football on their day off. 300 miles (480 km) away, however, others were cheering for Hitler. The Brits try to reason with him through the Munich Agreement, but he breaks his word, invading Czechoslovakia and Poland. Now "John Britain," as he is personified, is at war, and pretty soon he is at war alone, since western Europe soon falls to the Nazis. For one solid year, from June 1940 to June 1941, he is alone.

Various differences in British and American culture are addressed, sometimes humorously, other more soberly, such as the position of the monarchy and the peers in British society. "Britain is like your Grandma's house; she's been around a long time and keeps a lot of old things she doesn't wish to part with." However, the British and Americans also have many things in common, more important things, such as a free representative government (where Americans call it Congress, the British call it Parliament), freedom of speech, freedom of the press, and freedom of religion. The film also mentions how, centuries ago, the British fought for Magna Carta, and how the Americans adopted these principles and made it their own in the U.S. Constitution. In conclusion, America and Britain are more similar than the Nazis want to believe.

Next, the film delves into the British Empire, a trickier subject. First, it refutes the Nazi claim that Britain only declared war on Germany to save the British Empire.

Here's the British Empire, and here's where the Germans were headed when Britain declared war (map showing Nazi invasion of Poland). Does that look like trying to save the Empire? Tackling Germany when it was headed into Poland and towards Russia, the one direction in which there were no British possessions?

The Nazis expected the British time and again to negotiate a peace offer with them. But the British had no intention of doing so; they intended to, in Winston Churchill's words, teach the Nazis "a lesson which they – and the world – will never forget." The narrator then delves into the Empire itself: first, the home-rule of Canada, South Africa, and the other white dominions, and then giving a rosy picture of how much self-government India has, and how, because of its strategic significance – "an effective block by the democratic world to keep the Nazis and Japs from uniting" and "the bases for United Nations bombers to get at the Japs in Burma" – it cannot be independent just yet, but the British would allow it to be so after the war was over, provided they could work out a constitution of their own. In the Mediterranean and North Africa, meanwhile, the British Empire made the American landings in North Africa possible.

The film also dispels the Nazi myth that the British are passively letting others fight the war for them ("Britain will fight to the last Australian, Canadian or New Zealander."). Contrary to Nazi belief, one inhabitant of the British Empire out of ten comes from Britain, while seven casualties out of ten are from Britain. In the Royal Air Force, two planes out of every three are operated by the British, who also operate four planes out of every five on the overseas fronts. Likewise, the Royal Navy, too, is also crewed almost entirely by the British. The British Merchant Navy is shown as particularly resilient, regardless of Nazi attacks.

== See also ==
- List of Allied propaganda films of World War II
