= Two Down and One to Go =

- Directed by: Frank Capra
- Release date: May 1945
- Running time: 31 minutes
- Country: United States
- Language: English

Two Down and One to Go was a short propaganda film produced in 1945 directed by Frank Capra; as its title might suggest, its overall message was that the first two Axis powers, Italy and Germany, had been defeated, but that one, Japan, still had to be dealt with.

Presented by the Secretary of War (Henry Stimson) and narrated by Army Chief of Staff George Marshall, the film is notable for its heavy use of animated graphics, spliced with stock footage. Opening with a fasces being splintered over Italy, and a swastika being exploded over Germany, the film cuts to an Arthur Szyk caricature of Benito Mussolini, Adolf Hitler and Emperor Hirohito, an X being superimposed on the respective dictators, then turning to Tojo. Gen. Marshall informs the audience why the United States had chosen a Europe first strategy for the war, noting the supply lines were far shorter for Europe, and that the US simply did not have the material, in the early stages of the war, to launch an invasion of Japan. He also notes that in the European theatre the US had strong fighting Allies and airbases in England which could help them launch an attack on Germany, while in the Pacific theatre we had "no airbases near Japan, and no strong allies, however brave".

The general ends the film by reminding the audience that the war cannot be won until Japanese military might is "completely crushed".

The Academy Film Archive preserved Two Down and One to Go in 2008. The film is part of the Academy War Film Collection, one of the largest collections of World War II era short films held outside government archives.

== See also ==
- List of Allied propaganda films of World War II
