= William Hornbeck =

American film editor and film industry executive

- Born: August 23, 1901; Los Angeles, California, United States
- Died: October 19, 1983 (aged 82); Ventura, California, United States
- Occupation: Film editor

William Hornbeck (August 23, 1901 – October 11, 1983) was an American film editor and film industry executive. In a 1977 poll of film editors, he had been called "the best film editor the industry has produced." He was nominated four times for the Academy Award for Best Film Editing, and won the award for A Place in the Sun (1951). Other important credits include It's a Wonderful Life (1946), Giant (1956), and I Want to Live! (1958). He edited films from notable directors including Zoltan Korda, Frank Capra, and George Stevens. Universal Pictures almost brought him on board to completely re-edit George Lucas' American Graffiti.

Hornbeck started his editing career in his teens with the Keystone Studios, which were located close to his family's home in Los Angeles, California. In the 1920s he became head of the editing department, working on dozens of films each year. In 1934 he went to England, where he headed the editing department for Alexander Korda's film production company. He was generally credited as the "supervising editor"; an exception was The Scarlet Pimpernel (1934), where he was credited as the editor. In 1941 he returned to the United States, and during World War II he served in the Pictorial Service of the Signal Corps of the United States Army. His unit, which produced the films in the Why We Fight series, was led by Frank Capra. Following the war he worked as an editor for a succession of studios and as a freelance editor. In 1960 Hornbeck became the Supervisor for Editorial Operations for Universal Pictures. In 1966 he became a vice-president of the same company. Hornbeck retired in 1976.

Hornbeck was one of the original members of the American Cinema Editors, the honorary society of film editors, when it was founded in 1950. Hornbeck died in 1983. In her appreciation, Jeanine Basinger wrote "A true pioneer and a major international influence on film editing, Hornbeck and his work should be remembered for its quality and influence, as well as for his contribution in terms of training a whole generation of young editors in both England and America." Some of his papers are included in the Ogden and Mary Louise Reid Cinema Archives at Wesleyan University

== Selected filmography ==
Filmography based on the listing at the Internet Movie Database.

Editor
Year	Film	Director	Notes
1927	His First Flame	Harry Edwards	
1927	The Girl from Everywhere	Edward F. Cline	
1928	The Good-Bye Kiss	Mack Sennett	First collaboration with Mack Sennett
1929	Midnight Daddies	Mack Sennett	Second collaboration with Mack Sennett
1932	Hypnotized	Mack Sennett	Third collaboration with Mack Sennett
1934	The Scarlet Pimpernel	Harold Young	
1941	Lydia	Julien Duvivier	
1946	It's a Wonderful Life	Frank Capra	First collaboration with Frank Capra
1947	Singapore	John Brahm	
1948	State of the Union	Frank Capra	Second collaboration with Frank Capra
1949	The Heiress	William Wyler	
1950	Riding High	Frank Capra	Third collaboration with Frank Capra
1951	A Place in the Sun	George Stevens	First collaboration with George Stevens
1952	Something to Live For	George Stevens	Second collaboration with George Stevens
1953	Shane	George Stevens	Third collaboration with George Stevens
1953	Act of Love	Anatole Litvak	
1954	The Barefoot Contessa	Joseph L. Mankiewicz	First collaboration with Joseph L. Mankiewicz
1955	The Girl Rush	Robert Pirosh	
1956	Giant	George Stevens	Fourth collaboration with George Stevens
1958	The Quiet American	Joseph L. Mankiewicz	Second collaboration with Joseph L. Mankiewicz
1958	I Want to Live!	Robert Wise	
1959	A Hole in the Head	Frank Capra	Fourth collaboration with Frank Capra
1959	Suddenly, Last Summer	Joseph L. Mankiewicz	Third collaboration with Joseph L. Mankiewicz

Editorial department
Year	Film	Director	Role
1934	Moscow Nights	Anthony Asquith	Supervising editor
1935	Sanders of the River	Zoltan Korda	Supervising editor
1935	The Ghost Goes West	René Clair	Supervising editor
1936	Things to Come	William Cameron Menzies	Supervising editor
1936	The Man Who Could Work Miracles	Lothar Mendes	Supervising editor
1936	Rembrandt	Alexander Korda	Supervising editor
1936	Men Are Not Gods	Walter Reisch	Supervising editor
1937	Dark Journey	Victor Saville	Supervising editor
1937	Elephant Boy	Robert J. Flaherty; Zoltan Korda	Supervising editor
1937	Storm in a Teacup	Ian Dalrymple; Victor Saville	Supervising editor
1937	Knight Without Armour	Jacques Feyder	Supervising editor
1937	The Return of the Scarlet Pimpernel	Hanns Schwarz	Supervising editor
1937	Paradise for Two	Thornton Freeland	Supervising editor
1938	The Divorce of Lady X	Tim Whelan	Supervising editor
1938	The Drum	Zoltan Korda	Supervising editor
1938	Prison Without Bars	Brian Desmond Hurst	Supervising editor
1938	The Rebel Son	Adrian Brunel; Albert de Courville; Alexis Granowsky	Supervising editor
1939	Over the Moon	Thornton Freeland; William K. Howard	Supervising editor
1939	Q Planes	Tim Whelan; Arthur B. Woods	Supervising editor
1939	The Spy in Black	Michael Powell	Supervising film editor
1939	The Four Feathers	Zoltan Korda	Supervising editor
1939	The Lion Has Wings	Michael Powell; Brian Desmond Hurst; Adrian Brunel; Alexander Korda	Supervising editor
1940	21 Days	Basil Dean	Supervising editor
1940	The Thief of Bagdad	Michael Powell; Ludwig Berger; Tim Whelan	Supervising editor
1941	That Hamilton Woman	Alexander Korda	Supervising film editor
1941	Lydia	Julien Duvivier	Supervising film editor
1942	Jungle Book	Zoltan Korda	Supervising film editor
1947	Magic Town	William A. Wellman	Montage
1959	Suddenly, Last Summer	Joseph L. Mankiewicz	Editorial consultant

Documentaries

Additional crew
Year	Film	Director	Role
1945	Here Is Germany	Frank Capra	Project officer

Shorts

Editor
Year	Film	Director
1926	Flirty Four-Flushers	Edward F. Cline

== See also ==
- List of film director and editor collaborations - Hornbeck edited four films directed by Frank Capra. It's a Wonderful Life (1946) received numerous Academy Award nominations. Vincent LoBrutto included an analysis of Hornbeck's contributions in his 2012 book,The Art of Motion Picture Editing.
