= Propaganda in the United States =

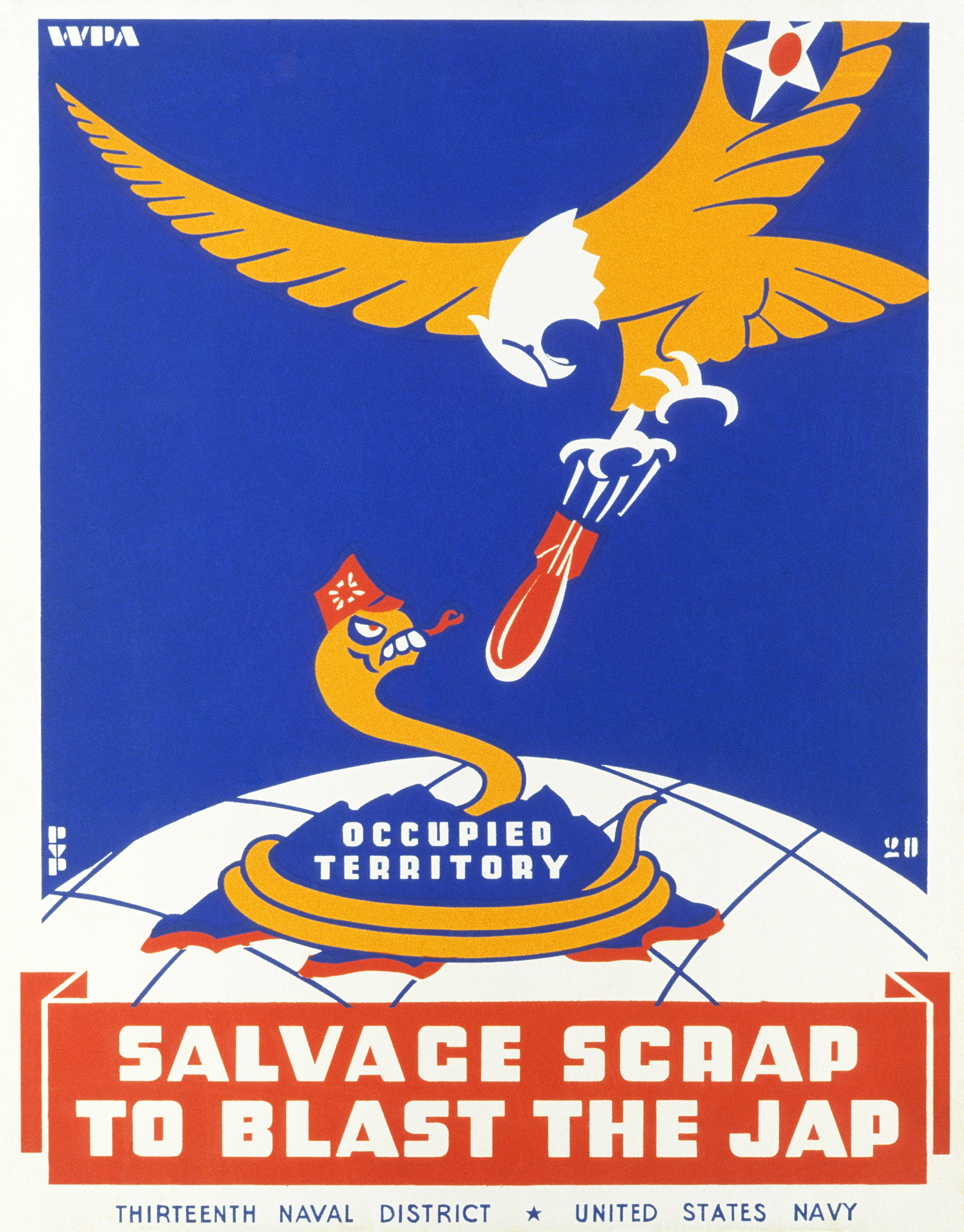
An American propaganda poster from World War II produced under the Works Progress Administration

In the United States, propaganda is spread by both government and non-government entities. Throughout its history, to the present day, the United States government has issued various forms of propaganda to both domestic and international audiences. The US government has instituted various domestic propaganda bans throughout its history; however, some commentators question the extent to which these bans are respected.

In Manufacturing Consent published in 1988, Edward S. Herman and Noam Chomsky argue that the mass communication media of the U.S. "are effective and powerful ideological institutions that carry out a system-supportive propaganda function, by reliance on market forces, internalized assumptions, and self-censorship, and without overt coercion". Some academics have argued that Americans are more susceptible to propaganda due to the culture of advertising.

== Domestic ==
Politico noted the ineffectiveness of domestic propaganda bans. "Officials get around the restriction on publicity agents by giving public relations staff such titles as “health communications specialist” or they outsource the spinmeister work to private communications firms. During an effort to cut back on PR in the administration of Harry Truman, the Air Force even classified some public affairs officers as chaplains."

During the Reconstruction era, newspapers and illustrated engravings helped shape a reunified national narrative, leveraging the wartime communications infrastructure for peacetime persuasion and identity-building rather than purely military propaganda.

=== World War I ===
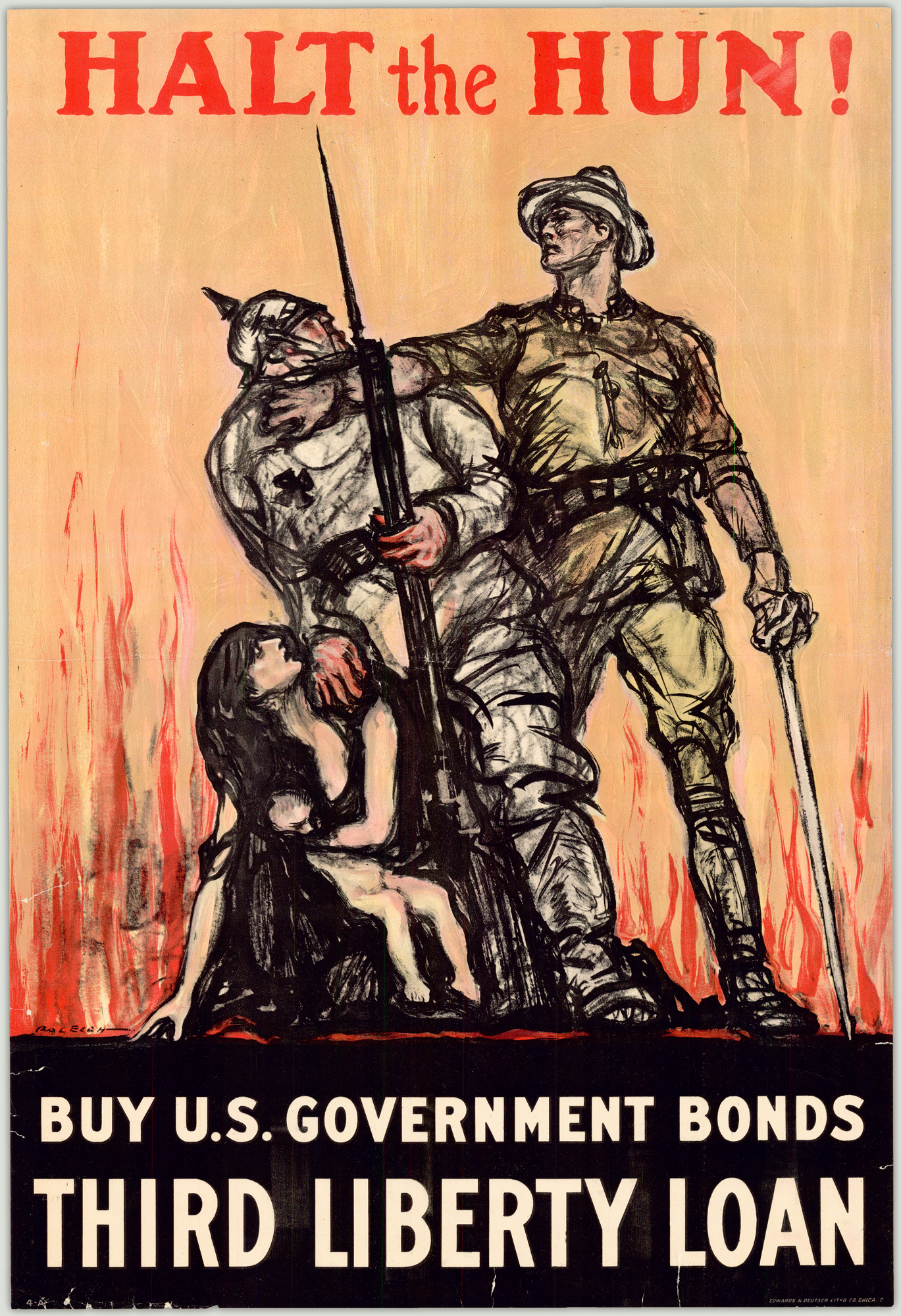
World War I fundraising poster

The first large-scale use of propaganda by the U.S. government came during World War I. The government enlisted the help of citizens, including children, to help promote war bonds and stamps to help stimulate the economy. To keep the prices of war supplies down (steel, food, etc.), the U.S. government produced posters that encouraged people to reduce waste and grow their own vegetables in "victory gardens". The public skepticism that was generated by the heavy-handed tactics of the Committee on Public Information would lead the postwar government to officially abandon the use of propaganda.

The 1915 film The German Side of the War was compiled from footage filmed by Chicago Tribune cameraman Edwin F. Weigle. It was one of the only American films to show the German perspective of the war. At the theater lines stretched around the block; the screenings were received with such enthusiasm that would-be moviegoers resorted to purchasing tickets from scalpers.

=== World War II ===
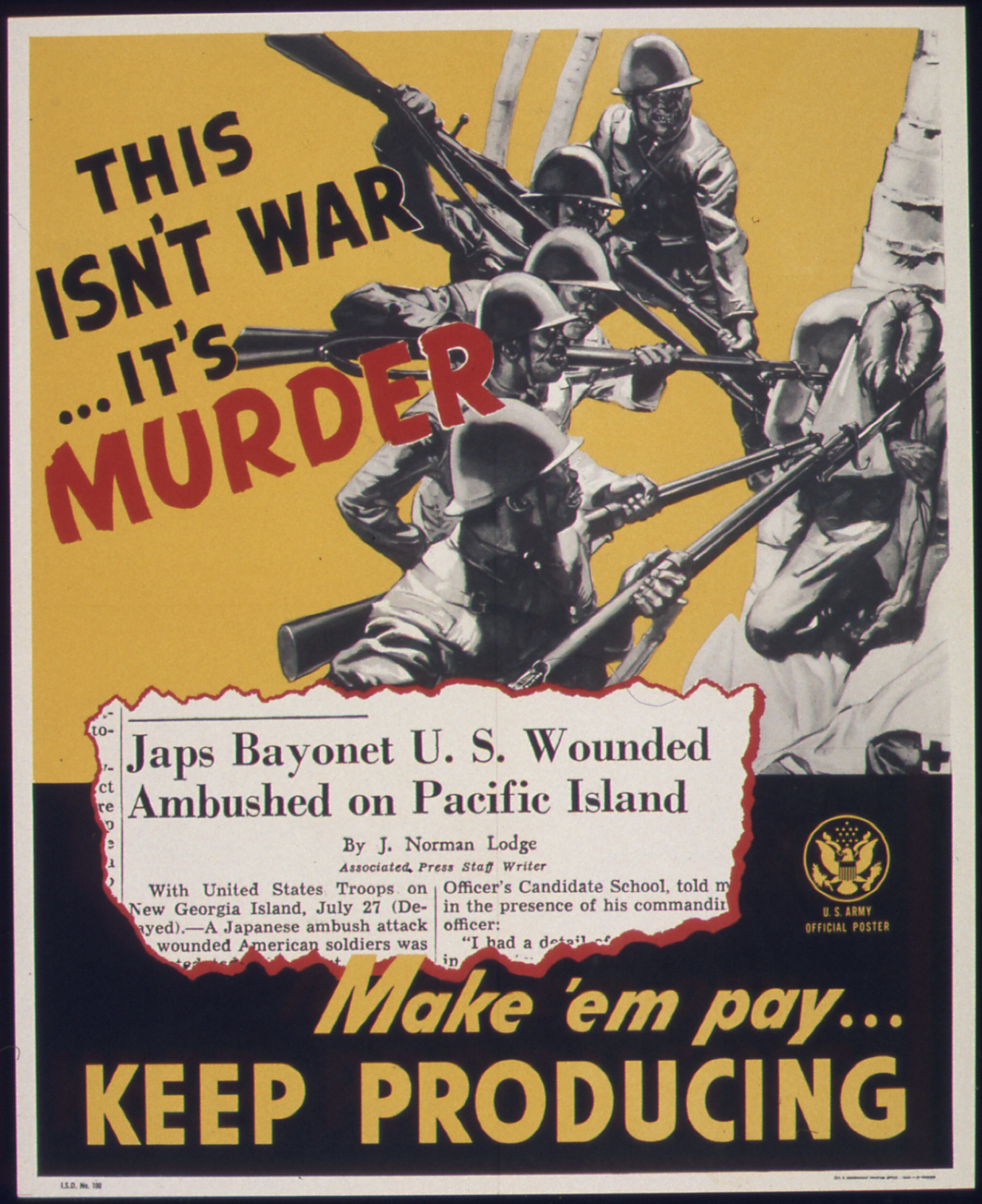
World War II propaganda poster

During World War II, the official policy of the United States was to not produce propaganda, but the Roosevelt government circumvented it by various means. One such propaganda tool was the publicly owned but government-funded Writers' War Board (WWB). The activities of the WWB were so extensive that it has been called the "greatest propaganda machine in history". Response to the use of propaganda in the United States was mixed, as attempts by the government to release propaganda during World War I was negatively perceived by the American public.

Initially, the US government had no centralized effective propaganda strategy, as President Roosevelt in particular seemed hesitant to institute an official government propaganda agency—in part due to the negative legacy of World War I's propaganda, with it often remembered as being manipulative or coercive in its tactics. However, after the outbreak of war in Europe and in the subsequent years prior to America's involvement, Roosevelt set up a number of different agencies to address problems concerning the dissemination of information, national morale, and public opinion. The power of these agencies was limited, with Roosevelt still seeming reluctant to create a dedicated propaganda agency, and some of these agencies received criticism from Roosevelt's political opponents and the press.

Eventually, it became clear that the information network of the government needed to be streamlined and restructured, culminating in the United States Office of War Information (OWI) being created in June 1942, and consolidating the functions of the previously established agencies. The mandate of the OWI was to promote understanding of the war policies under the director Elmer Davis. It dealt with posters, press, movies, exhibitions, and produced often slanted material conforming to US wartime purposes. These efforts built on earlier 19th-century uses of mass media, when illustrated newspapers and posters helped normalize visual persuasion in American politics. Another example of the OWI's efforts was Why We Fight, a famous series of US government propaganda films commissioned by the OWI to justify US involvement in World War II.

Cultural and racial stereotypes were used in World War II propaganda to encourage the perception of the Japanese people and government as a "ruthless and animalistic enemy that needed to be defeated", leading to many Americans seeing all Japanese people in a negative light. Many people of Japanese ancestry, most of whom were American citizens, were forcibly rounded up and placed in internment camps in the early 1940s.

From 1944 to 1948, prominent US policy makers promoted a domestic propaganda campaign aimed at convincing the U.S. public to agree to a harsh peace for the German people, for example by removing the common view of the German people and the Nazi Party as separate entities. The core of this campaign was the Writers' War Board, which was closely associated with the Roosevelt administration.

=== Cold War ===
Propaganda during the Cold War was at its peak in the early years, during the 1950s and 1960s. The United States would make propaganda that criticized the Soviet Union. The American government dispersed propaganda through movies, television, music, literature and art. The United States officials did not call it propaganda, maintaining they were portraying accurate information about Russia and their Communist way of life during the 1950s and 1960s. The United States boycotted the 1980 Olympics held in Moscow along with Japan and West Germany, among many other nations. When the Olympics were held in Los Angeles in 1984, the Soviets retaliated by not showing up for the games. In terms of education, American propaganda took the form of videos children watched in school; one such video is called How to Spot a Communist.

=== Operation Mockingbird ===
Operation Mockingbird was an alleged large-scale program of the United States Central Intelligence Agency (CIA) that began in the early years of the Cold War and attempted to manipulate domestic American news media organizations for propaganda purposes. According to author Deborah Davis, Operation Mockingbird recruited leading American journalists into a propaganda network and influenced the operations of front groups. CIA support of front groups was exposed when an April 1967 Ramparts article reported that the National Student Association received funding from the CIA. In 1975, Church Committee Congressional investigations revealed Agency connections with journalists and civic groups.

=== War on Drugs ===
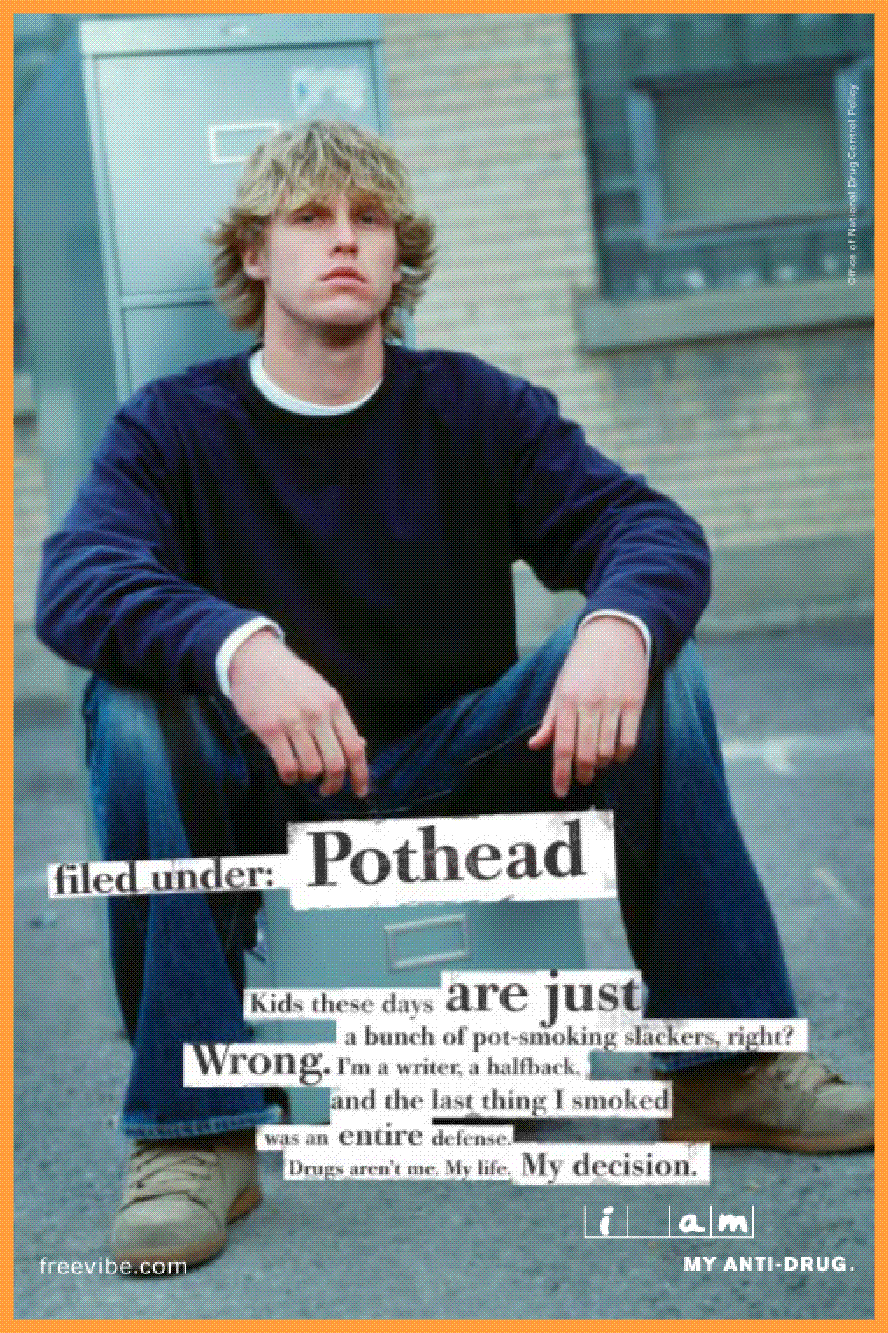
Poster concerning cannabis in the United States, c. 2000

There has been an abundant amount of propaganda in the half-century-long "war on drugs" that began under President Richard Nixon in June 1971, when he initiated the first federally funded programs aimed at drug prevention in the U.S. The 1960s had seen the rise of a rebellious youth movement that popularized drug use. With many citizens using cannabis and other drugs, and many soldiers returning from Vietnam with heroin habits, there was widespread drug use in the U.S. One tactic of Nixon's initiative, still used today, was a national anti-drug media campaign aimed at youths. The government used posters and advertisements to scare children and teenagers into avoiding drug use.

Between 1971 and 2011, the U.S. spent more than $2.5 trillion fighting the war on drugs. Nixon also dramatically increased the presence of federal drug control agencies, and pushed through measures such as mandatory sentencing and no-knock warrants.

The Drug Enforcement Administration (DEA) was created during his second term in 1973 to tackle both domestic drug use and the smuggling of illegal narcotics into America. The D.A.R.E. program began in 1983 (during the Reagan administration) and dovetailed with Nancy Reagan's campaign to educate children to "Just Say No" to drugs. The messaging permeated popular culture and was promoted by broadcasters through such venues as scripted television sitcoms and family programs, in effect to have fiction help influence reality. By 2003, the D.A.R.E. program had cost $230 million and involved 50,000 police officers, but never showed promising results in reducing illegal drug use.

The National Youth Anti-Drug Media Campaign, originally established by the National Narcotics Leadership Act of 1988, is a domestic propaganda campaign designed to "influence the attitudes of the public and the news media with respect to drug abuse" with a related goal of "reducing and preventing drug abuse among young people in the United States". Now conducted by the Office of National Drug Control Policy under the Drug-Free Media Campaign Act of 1998, the media campaign cooperates with the Partnership for a Drug-Free America and other government and non-government organizations.

=== Gulf War ===
Shortly after Iraq's invasion of Kuwait in 1990, the organization Citizens for a Free Kuwait was formed in the US. It hired the public relations firm Hill & Knowlton for about $11 million, paid by Kuwait's government.

Among many other means of influencing US opinion, such as distributing books on Iraqi atrocities to US soldiers deployed in the region, "Free Kuwait" T-shirts and speakers to college campuses, and dozens of video news releases to television stations, the firm arranged for an appearance before a group of members of the US Congress in which a young woman identifying herself as a nurse working in the Kuwait City hospital described Iraqi soldiers pulling babies out of incubators and letting them die on the floor.

The story helped tip both the public and Congress towards a war with Iraq: six Congressmen said the testimony was enough for them to support military action against Iraq and seven Senators referenced the testimony in debate. The Senate supported the military actions in a 52–47 vote. However, a year after the war, this allegation was revealed to be a fabrication. The young woman who had testified was found to be a member of Kuwait's Royal Family and the daughter of Kuwait's ambassador to the US. She had not lived in Kuwait during the Iraqi invasion.

=== Iraq War ===
In early 2002, the U.S. Department of Defense launched an information operation, colloquially referred to as the Pentagon military analyst program. The goal of the operation is "to spread the administrations's talking points on Iraq by briefing retired commanders for network and cable television appearances," where they have been presented as independent analysts. On May 22, 2008, after this program was revealed in The New York Times, the House passed an amendment that would make permanent a domestic propaganda ban that until now has been enacted annually in the military authorization bill.

The Shared Values Initiative was a public relations campaign that was intended to sell a "new" America to Muslims around the world by showing that American Muslims were living happily and freely, without persecution, in post-9/11 America. Funded by the United States Department of State, the campaign created a public relations front group known as the Council of American Muslims for Understanding (CAMU). The campaign was divided in phases; the first of which consisted of five mini-documentaries for television, radio, and print with shared values messages for key Muslim countries.

=== Ad Council ===
The Ad Council, an American non-profit organization that distributes public service announcements on behalf of various private and federal government agency sponsors, has been labeled as "little more than a domestic propaganda arm of the federal government" given the Ad Council's historically close collaboration with the President of the United States and the federal government. According to the Ad Council official website they aim to make sure advertisements are not as biased and do not harm any individuals. They have a myriad of published press releases and news articles relaying around different topics in the United States.

=== Smith-Mundt Modernization Act ===
In 2013, the Smith-Mundt Act, colloquially known as the "anti-propaganda law" was amended. The amendment repealed the Smith-Mundt's act ban on disseminating "information and material about the United States intended primarily for foreign audiences".

Some advocates of repealing the anti-propaganda law did so in the name of "transparency", an approach that The Atlantic called "a remarkably creative spin". Michael Hastings suggested that the Smith-Mundt Modernization Act would open the door to the dissemination of Pentagon propaganda to domestic audiences, while a Pentagon official told Hastings that "senior public affairs" officers in the Department of Defense sought to "get rid" of Smith-Mundt because it restricts methods used to cultivate support for unpopular policies, such as the Iraq and Afghanistan wars.

=== COVID-19 pandemic ===
In April 2020, President Donald Trump and the United States government played a campaign video for the Republican Party, which was widely regarded as a propaganda video. This video referred to a timeline of the U.S. government's response to the pandemic, only displaying favorable moments. Some commentators and analysts believed that this was to protect President Donald Trump and his government's reputation, especially before the country's 2020 presidential election. Supporters maintained this was to combat widespread media criticism stating that he failed to act quickly enough to stop the spread of COVID-19.

==== ChinaAngVirus disinformation campaign ====
According to a report by Reuters, the United States ran a disinformation campaign in the Philippines, later expanded to Central Asia and the Middle East, from 2020 to 2021. It sought to discredit China; particularly its Sinovac vaccine. The campaign was overseen by Special Operations Command Pacific as well as the United States Central Command. Military personnel at MacDill Air Force Base in Florida operated phony social media accounts, some of which were more than five years old according to Reuters. During the COVID-19 pandemic, they disseminated hashtags of #ChinaIsTheVirus and posts claiming that the Sinovac vaccine contained gelatin from pork and therefore was haram or forbidden for purposes of Islamic law. US diplomats aware of the campaign were against the idea, but they were overruled by the military, which also asked tech companies not to take down the content after it was discovered by Facebook and Twitter. A retrospective review by the DoD subsequently uncovered other social and political messaging that was "many leagues away" from acceptable military objective. The primary contractor for the U.S. military on the project was General Dynamics IT, which received $493 million for its role. The campaign reportedly aimed to counter "China’s COVID diplomacy." A Pentagon spokesperson noted to Reuters that China had started a "disinformation campaign to falsely blame the United States for the spread of COVID-19."

== International ==
Through several international broadcasting operations, the US disseminates American cultural information, official positions on international affairs, and daily summaries of international news. These operations fall under the International Broadcasting Bureau, the successor of the United States Information Agency, established in 1953 (which had a $2 billion annual budget). IBB's operations include Voice of America, Radio Free Europe/Radio Liberty, Alhurra and other programs. They broadcast mainly to countries where the United States finds that information about international events is limited, either due to poor infrastructure or government censorship. The Smith-Mundt Act prohibits the Voice of America from disseminating information to US citizens that were produced specifically for a foreign audience.

During the Cold War, the United States ran covert propaganda campaigns in countries that appeared likely to become Soviet satellites, such as Italy, Afghanistan, and Chile. According to the Church Committee report, US agencies ran a "massive propaganda campaign" on Chile, where over 700 news items placed in American and European media resulted from CIA activities in a six-weeks period alone.

In 2006, The Pentagon announced the creation of a new unit aimed at spreading propaganda about supposedly "inaccurate" stories being spread about the Iraq War. These "inaccuracies" have been blamed on the enemy trying to decrease support for the war. Donald Rumsfeld has been quoted as saying these stories are something that keeps him up at night.

United States President Donald Trump described the Voice of America as propaganda while cutting its funding in 2025.

=== Psychological operations ===
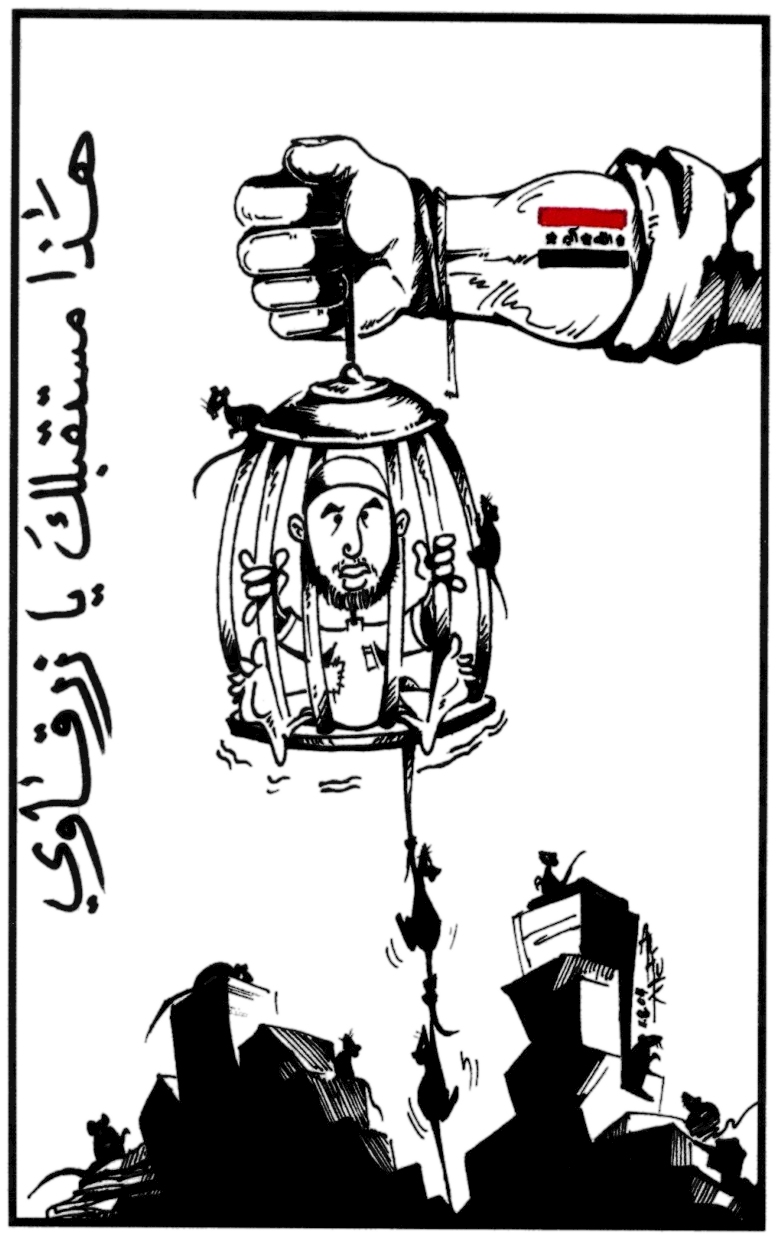
US PSYOP pamphlet disseminated in Iraq. Text: "This is your future al-Zarqawi" and shows al-Qaeda fighter al-Zarqawi caught in a rat trap.

The US military defines psychological operations, or PSYOP, as:

planned operations to convey selected information and indicators to foreign audiences to influence the emotions, motives, objective reasoning, and ultimately the behavior of foreign governments, organizations, groups, and individuals.

Some argue that the Smith-Mundt Act, adopted in 1948, explicitly forbids information and psychological operations aimed at the US public. However, Emma Briant points out that this is a common confusion: the Smith-Mundt Act only ever applied to the State Department, not the Department of Defense and military PSYOP, which are governed by Title 10 of the US Code. Nevertheless, the current easy access to news and information from around the globe, makes it difficult to guarantee PSYOP programs do not reach the US public. Or, in the words of Army Col. James A. Treadwell, who commanded the U.S. military psyops unit in Iraq in 2003, in The Washington Post:

There's always going to be a certain amount of bleed-over with the global information environment.

Agence France Presse reported on U.S. propaganda campaigns that:

The Pentagon acknowledged in a newly declassified document that the US public is increasingly exposed to propaganda disseminated overseas in psychological operations. But the document suggests that the Pentagon believes the US law that prohibits exposing the public to propaganda does not apply to the unintended blowback from such operations.

Former US Defense Secretary Donald Rumsfeld approved the document referred to, which is titled "Information Operations Roadmap." The document acknowledges restrictions on targeting domestic audience, but fails to offer any way of limiting the effect PSYOP programs have on domestic audiences. A recent book by Emma L. Briant brings this up to date, detailing the big changes in practice following 9/11 and especially after the Iraq War as US defense adapted to a more fluid media environment and brought in new internet policies.

Several incidents in 2003 were documented by Sam Gardiner, a retired Air Force colonel, which he saw as information-warfare campaigns that were intended for "foreign populations and the American public." Truth from These Podia, as the treatise was called, reported that the way the Iraq War was fought resembled a political campaign, stressing the message instead of the truth.

=== Social media ===
In 2011, The Guardian reported that the United States Central Command (Centcom) was working with HBGary to develop software that would allow the US government to "secretly manipulate social media sites by using fake online personas to influence internet conversations and spread pro-American propaganda." A Centcom spokesman stated that the "interventions" were not targeting any US-based web sites, in English or any other language, and also said that the propaganda campaigns were not targeting Facebook or Twitter.

In October 2018, The Daily Telegraph reported that Facebook "banned hundreds of pages and accounts which it says were fraudulently flooding its site with partisan political content – although they came from the US instead of being associated with Russia."

In 2022, the Stanford Internet Observatory and Graphika studied banned accounts on Twitter, Facebook, Instagram, and five other social media platforms that used deceptive tactics to promote pro-Western narratives. Vice News noted that "U.S. leaning social media influence campaigns are, ultimately, very similar to those run by adversarial countries.", while EuroNews quoted Stanford researcher Shelby Grossman as saying "I was shocked that the tactics we saw being used were identical to the tactics used by authoritarian regimes". Meta claimed that "individuals associated with the U.S. military" were connected to the propaganda campaign.

In October 2022, The Intercept reported that the Cybersecurity and Infrastructure Security Agency (CISA) was engaged in "broadening" efforts to counter speech that it considered "dangerous". Geoff Hale, the director of the Election Security Initiative at CISA, recommended the use of third-party information-sharing nonprofits as a “clearing house for information to avoid the appearance of government propaganda.”

The Intercept reported in December 2022 that the United States military ran a "network of social media accounts and online personas", and that Twitter whitelisted a batch of accounts upon the request of the United States government. Whitelisting the propaganda accounts gave them the same privileges of a user with a blue checkmark to increase the reach of their operations.

Researchers have described how generative AI and large language models lower the cost of producing propaganda material, including synthetic text and deepfake images, audio and video.

== See also ==
- AI-generated content in American politics
- Black propaganda
- Capitalist propaganda
- CIA influence on public opinion
- Fake news websites in the United States
- Mainstream media
- Make America Great Again
- Media bias in the United States
- Military–entertainment complex
- Military–industrial–media complex
- Operation Earnest Voice
- Operation Mockingbird
- Propaganda of the Spanish–American War
- Propaganda through media
- Shared values initiative
- White propaganda
