= Philip G. Epstein =

American screenwriter

Philip G. Epstein (August 22, 1909 – February 7, 1952) was an American screenwriter most known for his screenplay for the film Casablanca (1942), which won an Academy Award. He had written it in partnership with his twin brother Julius and Howard Koch as an adaptation of the unproduced play Everybody Comes to Rick's, written by Murray Bennett and Joan Alison.

== Early life and education ==
Epstein was born to a Jewish family on August 22, 1909, in New York City and raised on the Lower East Side of Manhattan; his identical twin brother was Julius Epstein. Their father Harry was a livery stable owner in the days when horses were widely used in the city. He and his brother Julius attended Pennsylvania State College (now Pennsylvania State University), gaining his degree in 1931. Following college, Philip took up acting and Julius became a professional boxer.

== Career ==
After college, the Epstein twins headed to Hollywood, hoping to work in the movie industry. They became successful screenwriters. Jack L. Warner, head of Warner Brothers, had a love-hate relationship with the Epstein brothers. He could not argue with their commercial success, but he deplored their pranks, their work habits and the hours they kept. In 1952, Warner gave the brothers' names to the House Un-American Activities Committee (HUAC). They never testified before the committee, but on a HUAC questionnaire, when asked if they ever were members of a "subversive organization," they wrote, "Yes. Warner Brothers."

== Personal life ==
Epstein was married to Lillian Targan from 1932. His son Leslie Epstein directed the creative writing program at Boston University and was a novelist. In 2003, Leslie published a fictionalized version of his boyhood titled San Remo Drive: A Novel from Memory. His grandson Theo Epstein is a former baseball executive who previously served as the president of baseball operations for the Chicago Cubs and as the general manager of the Boston Red Sox. His granddaughter Anya Epstein is a screenwriter.

Epstein died of cancer in Hollywood, California in 1952 at the age of 42. His brother Julius outlived him by almost 49 years, dying in 2000 at age 91.

== Filmography ==
Selected filmography as a screenwriter:

- Gift of Gab (1934)
- The Strawberry Blonde (1941)
- The Man Who Came to Dinner (1942)
- Casablanca (1942)
- Mr. Skeffington (1944)
- Arsenic and Old Lace (1944)
- The Last Time I Saw Paris (1954)
