= Frank P. Keller =

American film editor (1913-1977)

- Born: February 4, 1913; Pennsylvania, U.S.
- Died: December 25, 1977 (aged 64); Los Angeles, California, U.S.
- Occupation: Film editor
- Years active: 1943-1977

Frank P. Keller Jr. (February 4, 1913 – December 25, 1977) was an American film editor with 24 feature film credits from 1958 to 1977. He was noted for his work with director Peter Yates, particularly for the film Bullitt (1968), which earned him the Academy Award for Best Film Editing. He received an additional three nominations for the films Beach Red (1967), The Hot Rock (1972), and Jonathan Livingston Seagull (1973).

== Career ==
From 1942 to 1945, during the Second World War, Keller worked with editor Norval Crutcher on cataloging the film shot by combat cameramen in Europe. In 1949, Keller was editor Al Clark's assistant on All the King's Men (1949). From 1952 to 1956, Keller worked as an editor with Frank Capra on the first four films of The Bell Laboratory Science Series, sponsored by the American Telephone and Telegraph Company. Their work culminated with the 1956 televising (in color) of Our Mr. Sun, which was the first film of the series. Keller later edited the seventh and eighth films in the series, Thread of Life (1960) and About Time (1962), which were produced by Owen Crump for Warner Bros.

Keller's first editing credit on a feature film was for The Bonnie Parker Story (1958), which was a film noir directed by William Witney. In 1961 Keller edited Pocketful of Miracles, which was the last film directed by Frank Capra. Keller's television work included episodes from the series The Avengers (1962) and two episodes from the first season of Star Trek (1967–69). Keller is noted for editing six of the early films directed by Peter Yates, from Bullitt (1968) through Mother, Jugs & Speed (1976). His last feature film was for Rolling Thunder (directed by John Flynn-1977).

In 1976, Keller was elected to the Board of Governors of the Academy of Motion Picture Arts and Sciences.

=== Bullitt ===
The car chase from Bullitt is likely the scene from Keller's work that is best remembered, and it has been extensively discussed over the years. Leonard Maltin has called it a "now-classic car chase, one of the screen's all-time best." Emanuel Levy wrote in 2003 that, "Bullitt contains one of the most exciting car chases in film history, a sequence that revolutionized Hollywood's standards. Chasing the hoodlums, McQueen drives up and down the hills of San Francisco, while an impressive hand-held camera records the perilous pursuit and traffic in thrilling minutia detail, as his sexy vehicle narrowly misses intersecting cars and trucks; other barriers during the chase are pedestrians, buildings, and so on." Paul Monaco has written, "The most compelling street footage of 1968, however, appeared in an entirely contrived sequence, with nary a hint of documentary feel about it -- the car chase through the streets of San Francisco in Bullitt, created from footage shot over nearly five weeks. William A. Fraker, the cinematographer for the film, attributed the success of the chase sequence primarily to the work of Keller. At the time, Keller was credited with cutting the piece in such a superb manner that he made the city of San Francisco a "character" in the film."

== Death ==
Keller died in Los Angeles on Christmas Day 1977, aged 64.

== Filmography ==
=== Film ===
Year	Film	Director	Notes	Ref.
1958	The Bonnie Parker Story	William Witney		
1959	The Five Pennies	Melville Shavelson		
1959	Ghost of Dragstrip Hollow	William J. Hole Jr.		
1961	Pocketful of Miracles	Frank Capra		
1962	Safe at Home!	Walter Doniger		
1963	Papa's Delicate Condition	George Marshall		
1963	Come Blow Your Horn	Bud Yorkin		
1964	For Those Who Think Young	Leslie H. Martinson		
1966	Tarzan and the Valley of Gold	Robert Day		
1966	Cyborg 2087	Franklin Adreon		
1967	Beach Red	Cornel Wilde		
1968	Bullitt	Peter Yates	1st of 6 collaborations with Yates	
1969	John and Mary	Peter Yates		
1971	Murphy's War	Peter Yates		
1972	The Hot Rock	Peter Yates		
1973	Jonathan Livingston Seagull	Hall Bartlett		
1974	For Pete's Sake	Peter Yates		
1976	Mother, Jugs & Speed	Peter Yates		
1977	Rolling Thunder	John Flynn		
1977	Beyond Reason	Telly Savalas	Unreleased until 1985	

=== Television ===
Year	Title	Notes
1961	The Avengers	—N/a
1961	Outlaws	1 episode
1964−65	The Bing Crosby Show	5 episodes
1966	Star Trek: The Original Series	2 episodes
1968	The Ghost & Mrs. Muir	1 episode
1969	Room 222	1 episode

TV movies and specials

Year	Film	Director	Notes
1956	Our Mr. Sun	Frank Capra; William T. Hurtz	1st of 4 collaborations with Capra
1957	Hemo the Magnificent	Frank Capra; William T. Hurtz	
1957	The Strange Case of the Cosmic Rays	Frank Capra; William T. Hurtz	
1958	The Unchained Goddess	Richard Carlson; William T. Hurtz	
1960	The Thread of Life	Owen Crump; Robert McKimson	
1962	About Time	Owen Crump; Phil Monroe	
1971	The Forgotten Man	Walter Grauman	
1972	Gargoyles	Bill L. Norton	
1975	The Daughters of Joshua Cabe Return	David Lowell Rich	

== Awards and nominations ==
Award	Year	Category	Work	Result
Academy Awards	1968	Best Film Editing	Beach Red	Nominated
Academy Awards	1969	Best Film Editing	Bullitt	Won
Academy Awards	1973	Best Film Editing	The Hot Rock	Nominated
Academy Awards	1974	Best Film Editing	Jonathan Livingston Seagull	Nominated
American Cinema Editors Awards	1962	Best Edited Feature Film – Dramatic	Pocketful of Miracles	Nominated
American Cinema Editors Awards	1968	Best Edited Feature Film – Dramatic	Beach Red	Nominated
American Cinema Editors Awards	1969	Best Edited Feature Film – Dramatic	Bullitt	Won
American Cinema Editors Awards	1970	Best Edited Drama Series	Room 222 ("Richie's Story")	Nominated
American Cinema Editors Awards	1970	Best Edited Miniseries or Motion Picture for Television	Gargoyles	Nominated
American Cinema Editors Awards	1974	Best Edited Feature Film – Dramatic	Jonathan Livingston Seagull	Nominated
British Academy Film Awards	1970	Best Editing	Bullitt	Nominated
Primetime Emmy Awards	1957	Best Editing of a Film for Television	Our Mr. Sun	Won
