= The Bell System Science Series =

Television series

Dr. Research (left) and Mr. Fiction Writer (right) from the Bell series film Our Mr. Sun (1956). The roles were played by Dr. Frank Baxter and Eddie Albert, respectively.

The Bell System Science Series consists of nine television specials made for the AT&T Corporation that were originally broadcast in color between 1956 and 1964. Marcel LaFollette has described them as "specials that combined clever story lines, sophisticated animation, veteran character actors, films of natural phenomena, interviews with scientists, and precise explanation of scientific and technical concepts—all in the pursuit of better public understanding of science." Geoff Alexander and Rick Prelinger have described the films as "among the best known and remembered educational films ever made, and enthroning Dr. Frank Baxter, professor at the University of Southern California, as something of a legend as the omniscient king of academic science films hosts."

AT&T and its subsidiary Bell Telephone System had a history of sponsoring broadcasting such as the Bell Telephone Hour, which was a weekly radio program of classical and Broadway music. AT&T's advertising agency, N. W. Ayer & Son, suggested that they also sponsor "television specials aimed at family audiences", adding, "Science was a natural topic choice, given the accomplishments and reputation of the company's research arm, Bell Telephone Laboratories." They ultimately approached the famed filmmaker Frank Capra, who had numerous nominations and wins for the Academy Award for Best Director in the 1930s and 1940s for films such as It's a Wonderful Life (1946). Capra produced the four films that were broadcast from 1956 to 1958. The second four films were produced by Warner Bros. Pictures, with veteran filmmaker Owen Crump in charge; these were broadcast between 1958 and 1962. The final film was produced by Walt Disney Pictures, and was shown on TV in 1964. Each special explored a single subject in detail. The host for the first eight films was Frank C. Baxter, a USC professor of English and television personality who played the role of "Dr. Research" (or "Dr. Linguistics" in The Alphabet Conspiracy). The host for the last film in the series was Walt Disney.

Following their television broadcast, the films were made available free of charge for classroom use. J. B. Gilbert estimated that, by the mid-1960s, the films had been watched by five million schoolchildren and half a million college students; about 1600 copies of the film were ultimately distributed. The films were later released on home video and DVD. Over the more than 30 years they were in popular use, Baxter biographer Eric Niderost estimates, the films were seen by some 200 million students.

LaFollette notes, "Production approaches that are now standard practice on NOVA and the Discovery Channel derive, in fact, from experimentation by television pioneers like Lynn Poole and Don Herbert and such programs as Adventure, Zoo Parade, Science in Action, and the Bell Telephone System's science specials. These early efforts were also influenced by television's love of the dramatic, refined during its first decade and continuing to shape news and public affairs programming, as well as fiction and fantasy, today."

== The Capra films ==
The first four films of the series were produced and written by Frank Capra from 1952 to 1956. As described by biographer Joseph McBride, Capra had retired from feature filmmaking by 1952, due in part to the turmoil of the Hollywood Blacklist era. McBride writes that Capra "undoubtedly realized that the AT&T job was a way of going back to work quietly and rehabilitating his image". Matthew Gunter compares Capra's involvement with the Bell series to his work on wartime propaganda and training films: "As in the creation of the war documentaries, Capra dove into the work and rediscovered his passion for the filmmaking process. Like his work on the war films, he employed found footage and animation to verify, illustrate, and document what was being said in the voice-over narration." Capra later described the films: "Those four films about science, hand woven with bits of celluloid, were sprightly patterns of poesy and fact; fresh ideas were their main charm, a rather elegant charm, we thought, much like the light-hearted but disciplined charm of a Mozart composition." After the Bell series, Capra returned to feature films as the director of A Hole in the Head (1959).

Capra's screenplays called for two principal characters, "Dr. Research" and "Mr. Fiction Writer", who would interact both with each other and with animated characters specific to each film. Dr. Research mainly explains scientific matters. Matthew Gunter adds that the Fiction Writer "possesses many of the characteristics of the heroes in earlier Capra films" and "also acts like the audience's surrogate, often expressing a healthy skepticism or disbelief about the facts Dr. Research presents, asking questions to the scientist, and translating his technical verbiage into the language of the common people".

=== Religious elements ===
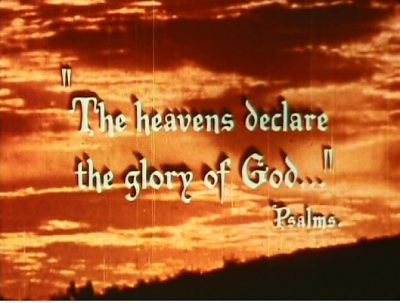
Screenshot from the beginning of Our Mr. Sun showing a quotation from the Bible.

An animation in The Unchained Goddess shows tourists in a glass-bottomed boat viewing the flooded remains of Miami after melting of the polar icecaps. The animation illustrates a possible consequence of global warming.

From the beginning of the project, Capra had insisted that the films would explore the relationship of science and religion. In his autobiography, Capra paraphrased his early comments to a meeting of the scientific advisory board assembled by AT&T and N. W. Ayer: "If I make a science film, I will have to say that science research is just another expression of the Holy Spirit that works in all men. Furthermore, I will say that science, in essence, is just another facet of man's quest for God." At a later stage in the project, Capra wrote that the films would have "the obligation to stress or at the very least to acknowledge the spiritual side of man's make-up—to acknowledge that all good things come from God—including science".

The religious elements in the screenplays occasioned much discussion and some acrimony with the scientific advisory board and consultants, such as Donald Menzel, but many were finally incorporated. James Gilbert has written, "When finally produced, Our Mr. Sun included a mixture of science, documentary footage, low-key advertising, and animation contained within a religious-magical framework. ... Most striking, Our Mr. Sun began and ended with inescapable religious allusions." Matthew Gunter writes, "in these films, Capra tries to create a common ground between science and religion—both are ways for the optimistic and the curious to think about the world and our place in it."

=== Casting and production ===
For Dr. Research, Capra selected Frank C. Baxter. Baxter was a professor of English at the University of Southern California who enjoyed great success as the host of Shakespeare on TV at about the same time as the Bell series was being made, and who won a Peabody Award in 1956. Baxter hosted many educational television programs in the 1950s, although perhaps none were as influential as the eight Bell series programs. He became "a full-fledged personality of the TV age—plain-spoken, not without humor and decidedly avuncular". The role of Mr. Fiction Writer was played by Eddie Albert in the first film, and by Richard Carlson in the next three. Albert was asked to reprise his role for the second film but was unavailable due to his work on another film. While Baxter and his role as Dr. Research continued to appear in the Warner films, The Fiction Writer disappeared.

The films were done in Technicolor, and marked Capra's first use of color in filmmaking. Cartoon animation was an important feature; the animated characters in the films interact directly with the live-action characters, which was an innovation at the time. Capra worked with United Productions of America (UPA) for the first film, Our Mr. Sun. At UPA, Bill Hurtz directed the animation for Our Mr. Sun; Hurtz had been the designer for the Oscar-winning cartoon short of Dr. Seuss' Gerald McBoing-Boing (1950) and would later direct animation for Jay Ward. In 1954, Hurtz moved to Shamus Culhane Productions, and the animation contract for the next three Capra films followed him there.

Harold E. Wellman was the cinematographer for the films; Wellman won an Emmy Award (Best Cinematography for Television) for the second film in the series, Hemo the Magnificent. All four films were edited by Frank P. Keller, who won an Emmy Award (Best Editing of a Film for Television) for the first, Our Mr. Sun. Keller worked with Capra at the beginning of his career; he subsequently became a prominent feature film editor, and won the Academy Award for Best Film Editing for Bullitt (1968).

=== Our Mr. Sun (1956) ===
Our Mr. Sun examines the Sun and how it works, the Sun's profound influence on life on Earth, and the possibilities for harnessing sunlight for solar electricity; solar cells had been demonstrated at Bell Laboratories in 1954 during the development of the film. For the screenplay, Capra first contracted for treatments by two prominent authors, Aldous Huxley and Willy Ley. Ultimately, Capra wrote the screenplay himself, subject to approval by a scientific advisory board put together by N. W. Ayer. The principal scientific source used for the screenplay was the book Our Sun (1949) by Donald Menzel, who also consulted with Capra about the screenplay. Menzel opposed most of the religious elements of Capra's screenplay, but many were included in the version that was produced.

The film starred Eddie Albert and Lionel Barrymore, as the Fiction Writer and as the voice of Father Time, respectively. The film was Barrymore's last screen role, and was broadcast two years after the actor's death. It introduced Frank C. Baxter as Dr. Research; Baxter played this role in the next seven films in the series. Marvin Miller voiced the Sun. Sterling Holloway had a smaller part (uncredited) voicing Chloro Phyll.

The film was first broadcast on November 19, 1956, at 10:00 p.m. to an audience estimated at 24 million viewers in the US and Canada, which was considered very successful at the time. Critical reaction was also favorable, and production of the next three films was authorized by AT&T and N. W. Ayer.

Our Mr. Sun was broadcast on CBS (a rare "colorcast" for that network at the time); all other films in the series were shown on NBC.

=== Hemo the Magnificent (1957) ===
Hemo the Magnificent is an examination of what the circulatory system is and how it works. It was written and directed by Frank Capra, and starred Frank C. Baxter as Dr. Research, Richard Carlson as the Fiction Writer, Sterling Holloway as the lab assistant, Mel Blanc as the squirrel, June Foray as the deer, and Marvin Miller as Hemo.

This film was first broadcast on March 20, 1957, at 9:00 p.m. This was a better hour for a family program than used for Our Mr. Sun, and the program had more viewers than those being broadcast on the two other major television networks.

=== The Strange Case of the Cosmic Rays (1957) ===
The Strange Case of the Cosmic Rays is an examination of what cosmic rays are and how they work. It was written by Capra with Jonathan Latimer, a crime fiction novelist and screenwriter. As Gilbert describes it, the third and fourth films "repeated the formulas of his earlier work while ever searching for new contrivances for popularization as well as the best language to express his soft religious message" and that the script was essentially a reworking of ideas Capra had developed for a possible documentary about Robert A. Millikan. The film's screenplay works from the premise that the nature of cosmic rays is a mystery comparable to the great detective stories. A committee of marionettes created and performed by Bil and Cora Baird representing Fyodor Dostoevsky, Charles Dickens, and Edgar Allan Poe is called upon to decide the question. The film was broadcast on October 25, 1957, apparently with a smaller television audience share and with more unfavorable reviews than for the first two specials.

=== The Unchained Goddess (1958) ===
The Unchained Goddess examines what weather is and how it works. It was the fourth and last film in the series that was produced by Frank Capra, who wrote the screenplay with Jonathan Latimer. Unlike the first three of the films, this film was directed by Richard Carlson, who also appears in the film. The film was televised on February 12, 1958, with a disappointing audience share and many critical press reviews.

Recent commentators have noted that this film exhibits an early concern with climate change caused by human activities.

== The Warner films ==
Screenshot from the opening credits of Gateways to the Mind (1958) showing part of William Kuehl's stage design. A camera is being rolled between giant sculptures of a human eye and a human mouth, which are props on a large and active soundstage.

The television ratings for these specials and the critical response to them were important to AT&T and to N. W. Ayer, which was apparently dissatisfied with The Strange Case of the Cosmic Rays and Unchained Goddess. Capra had also become unhappy with the working relationship with his sponsors. The fifth through the eighth films in the series were produced by Warner Bros. Pictures. The first screen in the credits for these films says, "Produced under the personal supervision of Jack L. Warner". Owen Crump was the producer for the four films, and directed three of them, but (unlike Capra) he did not write the screenplays. Crump retained Frank Baxter as the host for the four films, but he dispensed with the Dr. Research/Mr. Writer pairing of the Capra films.

Geoff Alexander and Rick Prelinger have written, "From the perspective of overall cohesion, writing, and set design, Crump's Bell series films are superior to those of Capra. Crump did not overtly proselytize, relied less on animated characters interacting with Dr. Baxter, and utilized the set design as almost a character in itself, as exemplified by William Kuehl's sound stage set for Gateways to the Mind, and his madcap carnival-like set for Alphabet Conspiracy." See the screenshot for one example of Kuehl's work. Marcel LaFollette has commented that, while the "spiritual tone" of the Capra films wasn't present in the Warner films, "overt appeals to religion also appeared in the four created by Warner Brothers".

Ellis W. Carter was the cinematographer for three of the films; Mark Davis was credited for Thread of Life. The first two Warner films were edited by the Warner Bros. veteran Fred MacDowell, who died in 1960. Frank P. Keller returned to edit the third and fourth films.

=== Gateways to the Mind (1958) ===
Gateways to the Mind is about what the five senses are and how they work. It was produced and directed by Owen Crump. The screenplay was by Henry F. Greenberg, a television screenwriter who was active in the 1950s and 1960s. In addition to Dr. Baxter, it starred Wilder Penfield and Hadley Cantrell, with actor Karl Swenson playing the role of a cameraman (the program was set on a soundstage in a mock "behind-the-scenes" format). Chuck Jones directed the animation, which was designed by Maurice Noble. In 1966, Jones won an Academy Award for Best Animated Short Film for directing The Dot and the Line: A Romance in Lower Mathematics (1965).

=== The Alphabet Conspiracy (1959) ===
The Alphabet Conspiracy examines language and its history. The screenplay was written by Leo Salkin and Richard Hobson. Salkin had worked for UPA (the firm that produced animations for Our Mr. Sun) both as an animator and as the writer for numerous cartoon shorts. The screenplay uses characters from Lewis Carroll's Alice in Wonderland. It was directed by Robert B. Sinclair, who had worked on numerous films and television programs. The cast included Cheryl Callaway as Judy, Stanley Adams as the theatrical agent, and Hans Conried as the Mad Hatter. Daws Butler (uncredited) voiced several characters. The animated sequences were directed by Friz Freleng, who subsequently won the Academy Award for Best Animated Short Film for directing The Pink Phink (1964).

=== Thread of Life (1960) ===
AT&T and N. W. Ayer were apparently somewhat dissatisfied with the first two Warner films, and unsuccessfully approached Capra about bidding on production of Thread of Life and About Time. Thread of Life is about heredity, DNA and how it works. The screenplay was by Rowland Barber, a writer perhaps best known for the 1960 novel The Night They Raided Minsky's. Owen Crump directed; Robert McKimson directed the animation.

=== About Time (1962) ===
About Time examines time. The screenplay was written by Richard Hobson, Nancy Pitt, and Leo Salkin. Owen Crump directed, with Phil Monroe directing the animations. The film starred Richard Deacon and Les Tremayne and featured Richard Feynman who was used as a consultant.

== The Disney film: The Restless Sea (1964) ==
The Restless Sea examines the oceans. The half-hour film was the last of the Bell Telephone Science Series, and was produced by Walt Disney Productions. The director was Les Clark; the film starred Sterling Holloway voicing an animated water droplet, who replaced Baxter.

== Home video and public domain releases ==
- Our Mr. Sun. Internet Archive. Low resolution version. The copyright for Our Mr. Sun was not renewed, and it has entered the public domain.
- Frank Capra's Wonders of Life: Our Mr. Sun / Strange Case of Cosmic Rays (DVD (region 1)). Image Entertainment. September 30, 2003. Catalog no. ID0214FCDVD.
- Frank Capra's Wonders of Life: Hemo the Magnificent / Unchained Goddess (DVD (region 1)). Image Entertainment. September 30, 2003. Catalog no. ID0213FCDVD.
- Gateways to the Mind. Internet Archive. Low resolution, public domain version.
- Gateways to the Mind / Thread of Life (DVD (region 1)). Warner Bros. November 20, 2007.
- The Alphabet Conspiracy. Internet Archive. Low resolution, public domain version.
- The Alphabet Conspiracy / Science Shorts (DVD (region 1)). Peter Rabbit Studios. March 5, 2008.
- Thread of Life. Internet Archive. Low resolution, public domain version.
- Bell Science: About Time (VHS (NTSC)). Rhino / WEA. 1991. OCLC 24789575.
- Bell Science: All four Capra films and four Warner Bros. films Laserdisc (NTSC) Rhino / WEA 1992

== Sources ==
- Gilbert, James Burkhart (1997). "9. Almost a message from God himself". Redeeming culture: American religion in an age of science. University of Chicago Press. pp. 199–224. ISBN 9780226293219. One chapter of Gilbert's book is devoted to the religious elements that Capra introduced into his four films of the Bell series.
