= Marvin Miller (actor) =

American actor (1913–1985)

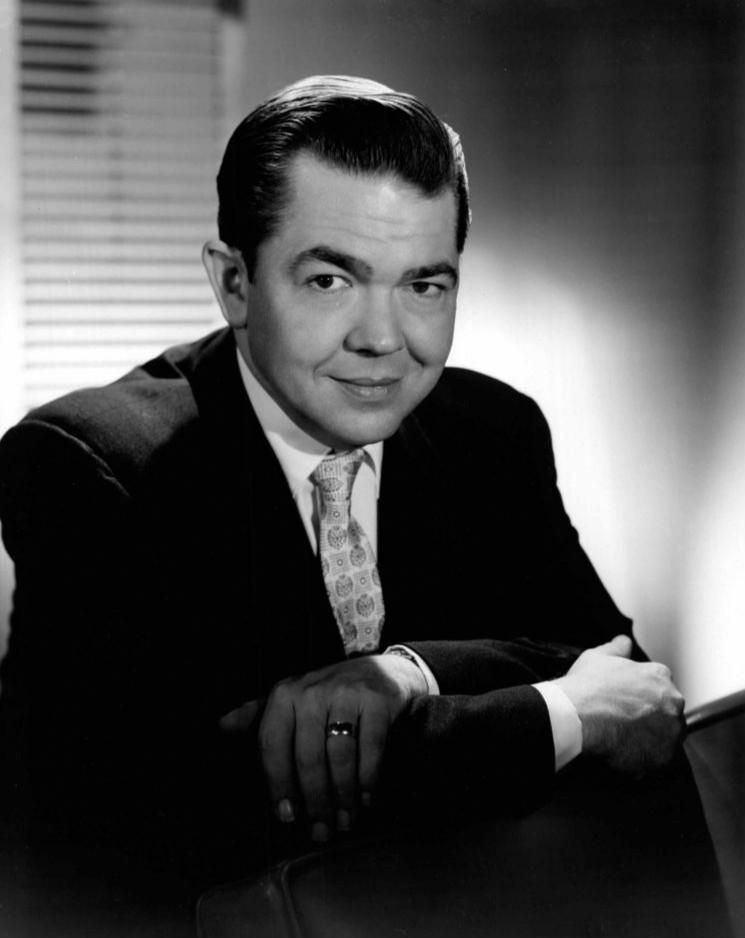
- Miller in 1958
- Born: Marvin Mueller; July 18, 1913; St. Louis, Missouri, U.S.
- Died: February 8, 1985 (aged 71); Los Angeles, California, U.S.
- Education: Washington University in St. Louis
- Occupations: Actor; announcer
- Years active: 1945–1985
- Spouse: Elizabeth Florence Dawson (m. 1937; div. 1965)
- Children: 2

Marvin Elliott Miller (born Marvin Mueller; July 18, 1913 – February 8, 1985) was an American actor. Possessing a deep baritone voice, he began his career in radio in St. Louis, Missouri, before becoming a Hollywood actor. He is remembered for voicing Robby the Robot in the science fiction film Forbidden Planet (1956), a role he reprised in the lesser-known The Invisible Boy (1957).

Miller's next most notable role is that of Michael Anthony, the loyal assistant of Paul Frees' generous millionaire John Beresford Tipton Jr., on the TV series The Millionaire (1955–1960).

== Career ==
=== Radio and recordings ===
Born in St. Louis, Miller graduated from Washington University in St. Louis before commencing his career in radio. When a singer named Marvin Miller debuted on another St. Louis radio station, he began using his middle initial to distinguish himself from the newcomer. For the Mutual Broadcasting System, he narrated a daily 15-minute radio show titled The Story Behind the Story, which offered historical vignettes. He also served as announcer on several Old Time Radio shows of the 1940s and 1950s, including the Louella Parsons Show (1948), The Jo Stafford Show and the long-running mystery series The Whistler.

Miller played Dr. Lee Markham on The Woman in White on NBC radio and Howard Andrews on Midstream on the Blue Network and appeared as "The voice of the Past" on the May 21, 1942 broadcast of The Right to Happiness. In 1945–47, he was the announcer for Songs by Sinatra. He played two characters and was the announcer on The Billie Burke Show (1943–1946).

In 1952, Miller had a one-man program, Armchair Adventures, on CBS Radio. He did "all voices and narration" in the 15-minute dramatic anthology. He also recorded 260 episodes of a program described in a 1950 trade publication as "Marvin Miller: Famous radio voice in series of five minute vignettes about famous people." The program was syndicated via electrical transcription by The Cardinal Company.

He also won Grammy Awards in 1965 and 1966 for his recordings of Dr. Seuss stories on RCA Records: in 1967 for Dr Seuss Presents – If I Ran the Zoo and Sleep Book and 1966 for Dr Seuss Presents Fox in Socks and Green Eggs and Ham. He also read Bartholomew and the Oobleck, Horton Hatches the Egg, The Sneetches and Other Stories, and Yertle the Turtle and Other Stories.,

In the mid-1970s, Miller even lent his voice to sports films, narrating the official Indianapolis 500 films in 1975 and 1976.

=== Film ===
In films, the heavyset Miller was often cast as a villain, many times playing Asian roles. He portrayed a sadistic henchman in the 1947 Humphrey Bogart film Dead Reckoning and was Yamada in the 1945 James Cagney film Blood on the Sun. In 1946's film noir Deadline at Dawn he plays Sleepy Parsons, a blind pianist. Miller played George "Gusty" Gustafson in the George Raft film noir classic Johnny Angel.

Additionally, he also appeared in Red Planet Mars (1952), Forbidden (1953), Time Stood Still (1956), and When the Girls Take Over (1962).

Miller also did a great deal of voice work in animation from the 1950s into the 1970s, from the narration on the 1950 Academy Award-winning United Productions of America cartoon Gerald McBoing-Boing and the 1952 Chamber of Commerce film The Story of Creative Capital to the 1970 The Ant and the Aardvark cartoon Scratch a Tiger.

=== Television ===
From 1949 to 1950 Miller starred as Dr. Yat Fu on the short-lived ABC series Mysteries of Chinatown, with Gloria Saunders cast as his niece, Ah Toy. In 1961, Miller guest-starred as Johnny Kelso, with Erin O'Brien, in "The Marble Slab" episode of the Frederick Ziv-, United Artists-, and MGM-produced Bat Masterson, starring Gene Barry. Original air date was May 11, 1961.

Further, in television, he was a narrator on The F.B.I., Police Squad!, Electra Woman and Dyna Girl, plus appeared on Land of the Lost and Love, American Style.

Miller voiced "Mr. Sun" in the AT&T Corporation educational film Our Mr. Sun, and "Hemo" in the AT&T educational film Hemo the Magnificent, parts of a series featuring Dr. Frank C. Baxter and directed by Frank Capra, which was shown on American network television in 1956 and 1957. Miller crossed paths with other prolific voice-over artists many times in his career, including June Foray, playing "Deer" in Hemo the Magnificent and in the TV series Rocky and Bullwinkle along with Paul Frees, who voiced "Boris Badenov" in that program. Miller and Frees also performed in separate segments on the audio recording Stan Freberg Presents the United States of America Volume One: The Early Years.

Miller made a guest appearance in 1963 on Perry Mason as unscrupulous attorney F.J. Weatherby in "The Case of the Lover's Leap".

Miller voiced Aquaman for the Filmation studio for their 1967 series The Superman/Aquaman Hour of Adventure. He was also the voice of pilot/scientist Busby Birdwell in the company's animated series Fantastic Voyage.

He was the voice of the arrogant alien "Zarn" in three episodes of the second season of Land of the Lost. Miller also lent his distinct voice to The Pink Panther Show, often talking with the feline offscreen and asking questions, while also voicing The Inspector, his second Deux Deux and their boss The Commissioner.

He also won Grammy Awards in 1965 and 1966, for his recordings of stories by Dr. Seuss.

In more than 200 episodes of The Millionaire, Miller played Michael Anthony, conveying the wishes of the "fabulously wealthy" John Beresford Tipton Jr., voiced by Paul Frees.

== Death ==
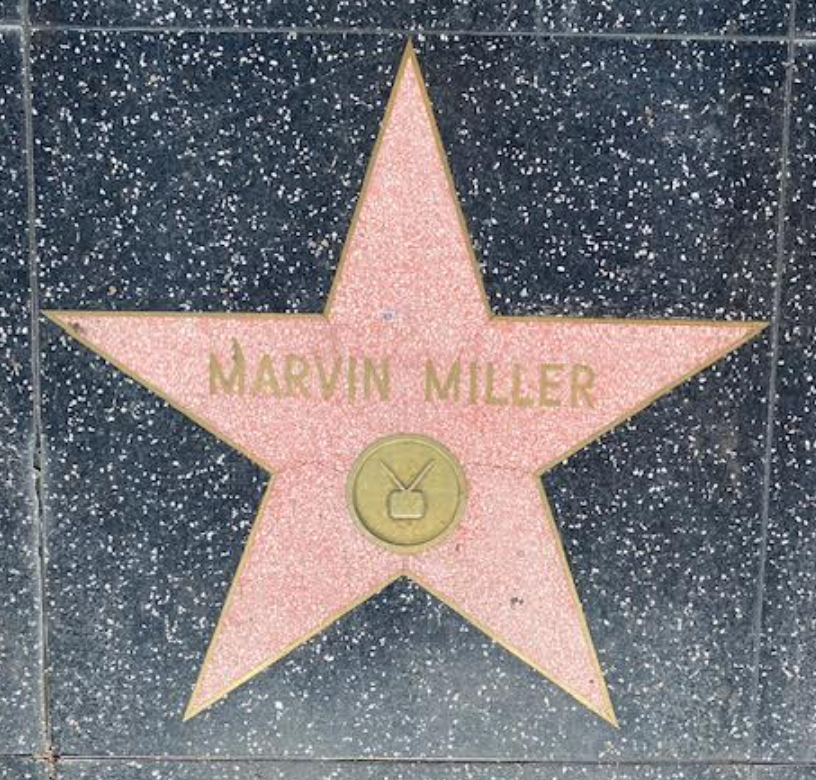
Miller's star on the Hollywood Walk of Fame.

Miller died in 1985 at the age of 71 from a heart attack.

For his contribution to the television industry, Marvin Miller has a star on the Hollywood Walk of Fame at 6101 Hollywood Boulevard.

== Filmography ==
Film
Year	Title	Role	Notes				
1945	Blood on the Sun	Yamada					
1945	Johnny Angel	George "Gusty" Gustafson					
1946	Deadline at Dawn	Sleepy Parsons					
1946	Just Before Dawn	Casper					
1946	The Phantom Thief	Dr. Nejino					
1946	Night in Paradise	Scribe					
1946	Without Reservations	Louella's radio announcer	Uncredited; Alternative title: Thanks God, I'll Take It from Here				
1947	Dead Reckoning	Krause					
1947	The Brasher Doubloon	Vince Blair	Alternative title: High Window				
1947	The Corpse Came C.O.D.	Rudy Frasso					
1947	Intrigue	Ramon Perez					
1951	Gerald McBoing-Boing	Narrator	Voice				
1951	Smuggler's Island	Bok-Ying					
1951	Peking Express	Kwon					
1951	The Prince Who Was a Thief	Hakar					
1951	The Golden Horde	Genghis Khan					
1952	Hong Kong	Tao Liang					
1952	Red Planet Mars	Arjenian					
1952	The Story of Creative Capital	Narrator	Voice. Credited				
1953	Off Limits	Vic Breck	Alternative title: Military Policemen				
1953	Ben and Me	Dr. Palmer / Miscellaneous Men	Voice				
1953	Forbidden	Chalmer					
1954	Jivaro	Jivaro Chief Kovanti					
1954	The Shanghai Story	Colonel Zorek					
1954	Beauty and the Bull	Narrator	Short, Voice				
1955	New York Confidential	Narrator	Voice, Uncredited				
1955	Godzilla Raids Again	Narrator	English version, Voice				
1955	King Dinosaur	Narrator	Voice				
1956	Forbidden Planet	Robby the Robot	Voice, Uncredited				
1957	The Deadly Mantis	Narrator					
1957	The Invisible Boy	Robby the Robot	Voice				
1957	The Story of Mankind	Armana					
1958	Manhunt in the Jungle	Narrator	Voice				
1958	Senior Prom	Narrator	Voice				
1958	Panda and the Magic Serpent	Narrator	Voice				
1959	Sleeping Beauty	Narrator	Voice, Uncredited				
1959	Sampo	Narrator	English version, Voice				
1961	The Phantom Planet	Introductory Narrator	Voice				
1962	When the Girls Take Over	Henri Degiere					
1962	Panic in Year Zero!	Radio Announcer	Uncredited				
1965	The Agony and the Ecstasy	Prologue Narrator	Uncredited				
1965	Saturday Night in Apple Valley						
1965	Invasion of Astro-Monster	Fuji	English version, Voice				
1965	Inside Daisy Clover	Narrator - The Daisy Clover Story	Voice, Uncredited				
1966	Gamera the Invincible	Voice over	Uncredited				
1967	Hell on Wheels	The Announcer					
1967-1969	The Inspector	The Commissioner / Pig-Al / Warden / Mack le Truck / Caribou Lou / Urg / Park Ranger / Bear / Psychiatrist / Dirty Pierre le Punk	Voice roles				
1970	MASH	PA Announcer	Uncredited				
1970	Blood of the Iron Maiden	Claude					
1971	Pink-In	Loud-Mouth Louie	Voice role; uncredited				
1972	Where Does It Hurt?	Catering Manager					
1972	The Sexpert	Michael Anthony	Uncredited				
1973	Fantastic Planet	Great Tree Chief / Master Kon / Additional Voices	English version, Voice				
1973	The Naked Ape	Fat Man					
1973	Tidal Wave		(US version)				
1974	How to Seduce a Woman	Racetrack Announcer					
1975	I Wonder Who's Killing Her Now?	Jordan's Boss					
1976	The Call of the Wild	Narrator	TV movie				
1977	Empire of the Ants		Voice, Uncredited				
1977	John Hus	Sigismund					
1977	Prime Time	Henry Wideman	Alternative titles: American Raspberry; Funny America				
1977	Space Cruiser Yamato		Voice, English version				
1981	Kiss Daddy Goodbye	Bill Morris					
1984	Swing Shift	Rollo					
1984	Gremlins	Robby The Robot	Voice, Uncredited				
1986	Hell Squad	The Sheik	Alternative titles: Commando Girls; Commando Squad, (final film role)				
Television
Year	Title	Role	Notes				
1949	Mysteries of Chinatown	Dr. Yat Fu	unknown episodes				
1952	Space Patrol	Mr. Proteus (continuing character) & other roles	1952–1954; 13 episodes				
1955	The Millionaire	Michael Anthony	1955–1960; 206 episodes				
1959	The Danny Thomas Show	Mr. Chow	1 episode				
1961	Bat Masterson	John Kelso	1 episode (episode 31)				
1961	The Adventures of Ozzie & Harriet	Man in Dream	1 episode				
1963	Perry Mason	F. J. Weatherby	1 episode				
1966	Batman	TV Announcer	1 episode (episode 12)				
1966–1974	The F.B.I	Narrator	117 episodes				
1967	The Superman/Aquaman Hour of Adventure	Aquaman (voice)	36 episodes				
1967	The Green Hornet	On-the-scene Reporter	1 episode				
1969-1970	The Pink Panther Show						
Narrator / The Inspector / Sgt Deux-Deux / The Commissioner	Bumper segments only						
1971	Adam-12, S4, E6, "The Ferret"	Doctor	1 episode	1972	Mission: Impossible	Smith	1 episode
1975	Land of the Lost	Zarn	Voice, 3 episodes				
1976	Electra Woman and Dyna Girl	Narrator	15 episodes				
1978	Wonder Woman	Mr. Beamer	1 episode				
1982	Police Squad!	Narrator	6 episodes				
