= Mysteries of Chinatown =

- Starring: Marvin Miller
- Country of origin: United States
- Original language: English
- No. of episodes: 48

Production
- Running time: 30 minutes

Original release
- Network: ABC
- Release: December 4, 1949 – October 23, 1950

Mysteries of Chinatown is an American crime drama series that aired on the ABC television network from December 4, 1949 to October 23, 1950. Marvin Miller made his television debut in the series.

== Cast ==
- Marvin Miller as Dr. Yat Fu
- Gloria Saunders as Ah Toy, niece of Dr. Fu
- Cy Kendall (pilot only)
- Spencer Chan as Lu Sung
- Keye Luke
- Ed MacDonald as Sgt. Cummings
- William Blythe at Sgt. Hargrove
- Robert Bice (played Dr. Yat Fu only in the pilot.)
- Wong Artarne as Yee Wai, nephew of Dr. Fu
- Bo Ling as Lo Sing

== Plot ==
The series focused on Dr. Yat Fu (Miller), the proprietor of a herb and curio shop in San Francisco's Chinatown, and also an amateur sleuth. Fu helped police to solve crimes, usually being helped by his nephew and niece.

Episodes included "The Body in Drawing Room D" and "The Case of the Missing Alibi".

== Production ==
Mysteries of Chinatown originated at an east Hollywood studio that ABC bought from Warner Bros. Episodes were broadcast live in Hollywood and recorded via kinescope to be sent to New York for later transmission to the rest of the United States. Ray Buffum was the producer, and Richard Goggin was the director. Rex Koury provided the music. The program was sustaining.

The episodes were written by pulp fiction author Robert C. Dennis who entered television screenwriting with this series after writing for the radio series The Cases of Mr. Ace.
