= Jerry Stagg =

American entertainment executive (1916–1978)

- Born: 1916
- Died: 1978 (aged 61–62)
- Occupations: Entertainment executive, radio writer, television producer, author
- Employer(s): William Morris Agency, Desilu Productions
- Known for: Producing Telephone Time and The Texan; authoring The Brothers Shubert

Jerry Stagg (1916–1978) was an American entertainment executive, writer, television producer, and author. He served during the Golden Age of Television as an early Head of Television for the William Morris Agency before producing anthology and Western series.

== Early years ==
Stagg was a pre-medical student at Columbia University.

== Career ==
=== Agency executive and radio work ===
In the 1940s and early 1950s, Stagg served as a Head of Television for the William Morris Agency, where he helped package early live programming, including network panel and drama segments. Simultaneously, he worked as a scriptwriter, contributing to popular dramatic and adventure serials of the era such as Hop Harrigan (c. 1942) and In Time to Come (1943).

In 1951 Jack Gould wrote in The New York Times that because of Stagg's work on Celanese Theatre, "he is probably in as enviable a position as anyone in TV. He knows what he is going to be doing, for example, the second week of April and already he is drawing up next season's schedule." Gould noted that playwrights whose work Stagg had obtained for the show included Maxwell Anderson, Philip Barry, S. N. Behrman, Rachel Crothers, Eugene O'Neill, Elmer Rice, Robert E. Sherwood, and John Van Druten.

=== Television production and Telephone Time ===
Between 1956 and 1958, Stagg partnered with Hal Roach Studios to produce the high-profile CBS/ABC anthology drama series Telephone Time. Stagg ensured that the series had upbeat stories with happy endings. Under Stagg's creative leadership, the series became a prestigious vehicle for Hollywood film icons, characterized by major star casting choices:

- John Carradine: Guest-starred in the historical anthology drama programming.
- Lon Chaney Jr.: Led the series' premiere broadcast in the celebrated episode "The Golden Junkman" (1956).
- Claudette Colbert: Featured in a starring role during the series' anthology run.
- Joseph Cotten: Performed as a lead character in a featured teleplay.
- Bette Davis: Starred in the critically acclaimed May 1957 episode "Stranded," playing a rural schoolteacher trapped with her students during a severe blizzard.
- Greer Garson: Starred alongside Florenz Ames in the dramatic 1957 episode "Revenge."
- Joel Grey: Guest-starred as a featured performer in the series' episodic line-up.
- Boris Karloff: Starred in the 1958 nautical drama episode "The Vestris."
- Michael Landon: Stagg famously gave the young actor (then billed under his legal name, Eugene Orowitz) his first major screen break by casting him in the title role of "The Mystery of Caspar Hauser" (1956).
- Cloris Leachman: Delivered a featured dramatic performance in an anthology segment.
- Fay Wray: Guest-starred in a prominent role during the show's network run.

Following Telephone Time, Stagg moved to Desilu Productions to produce the CBS Western series The Texan (1958–1960), starring Rory Calhoun. From 1959 to 1960, Stagg and his company, Blue J. Productions, produced the ABC documentary travelogue series John Gunther's High Road.

=== Theatrical production ===
Stagg also operated in live theater as an independent producer. He optioned and produced the Off-Broadway dramatic play Masquerade. The production starred Hollywood actress Veronica Lake.

=== Later years and authorship ===
In 1968, Random House published his 431-page biographical work, The Brothers Shubert. The book received widespread critical acclaim and remains a primary historical reference text for early 20th-century American theater history.

== Filmography & Credits ==
=== Television (As Producer) ===
- Telephone Time (1956–1958)
- The Texan (1958–1960)
- John Gunther's High Road (1959–1960)

=== Stage (As Producer) ===
- Masquerade (Off-Broadway, 1959)

=== Radio (As Writer) ===
- Hop Harrigan (c. 1942)
- In Time to Come (1943)

=== Bibliography ===
- Stagg, Jerry (1968). The Brothers Shubert. New York: Random House.
