= The Story of Creative Capital =

1957 film

- Directed by: Carl Urbano
- Written by: John Sutherland
- Produced by: John Sutherland; Associate Producer: George Gordon; Production Manager: Earl Jones
- Narrated by: Marvin Miller
- Music by: Les Baxter; Bill Scott (lyrics)
- Animation by: Ken O'Brien; George Cannata; Fred Madison
- Layouts by: Victor Haboush
- Backgrounds by: Joe Montell
- Production company: John Sutherland Productions
- Distributed by: E.I. DuPont De Nemours & Company Incorperated
- Release date: 1957
- Running time: 14-minutes
- Country: United States
- Language: English

The Story of Creative Capital (1957) is a 14-minute animated color sponsored film explaining the role of the investor in making capitalism work.

== Synopsis and background ==
The U.S. Chamber of Commerce film demonstrates the effect of personal investment on the broader American economy. The film is based on the 1955 pamphlet 'This Is du Pont: The Story of Creative Capital.'

Creative capital, the narrator says, is any form of wealth used in the production of more wealth. Capital is not money, but the tools of production: "an investment for which some return is expected." Capital is raised when individuals pool their resources or savings, which are then harnessed to purposefully fill needs within the marketplace. Once an idea for a new or improved product was conceived, investments were made to fund the construction or expansion of facilities, the purchase of raw materials and tools, and payroll.

Billions of dollars of invested capital, the film explains, have helped create the complex and efficient tools that have made work easier and individuals' time more valuable through greater productivity. For example, the film points out that in 1957: “In a typical 40-hour week, it takes only 21hours of work to buy the necessities of life. It takes 10 hours of work to pay your taxes. What you earn in the other 9 hours means you can buy a lot of things that make life more pleasant. And like most people, you’ll have something left over for savings and insurance.”

Viewers are reminded that any investment is inherently risky; however, when capital is invested successfully, it leads to increased industrial output and productive capacity, which in turn results in shorter work hours, higher wages, more leisure time, and improved products.

The film premiered in the opening session of the fifth annual Business Outlook Conference of the Washington Board of Trade on January 20, 1957.

The Story of Creative Capital was preserved with a grant from the National Film Preservation Foundation to the Hagley Library in Wilmington, Delaware, in 2009.

== Credits ==
- Sponsors: United States Chamber of Commerce and DuPont
- Production Company: John Sutherland Productions, Inc.
- Writer/Producer: John Sutherland (producer)
- Associate Producer: George Gordon
- Director: Carl Urbano
- Lyrics: Bill Scott (voice actor)
- Layout: Victor Haboush
- Backgrounds: Joe Montell
- Animation: Ken O’Brien, George Cannata, Fred Madison
- Narrator: Marvin Miller (actor)
- Music: Les Baxter
- Production Manager: Earl Jonas
