= Telephone Time =

American TV dramatic anthology series (1956–1958)

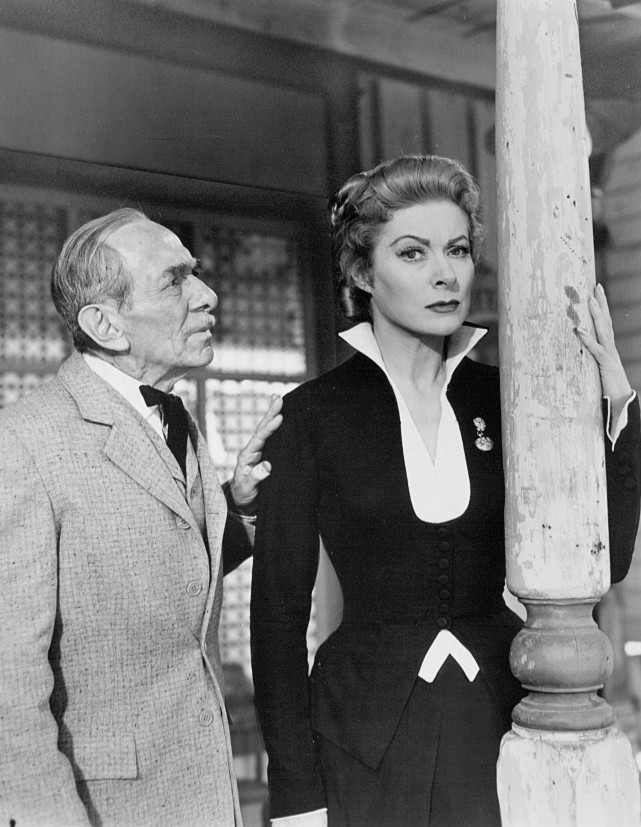
- Florenz Ames (left) and Greer Garson in "Revenge", 1957
- Genre: Anthology
- Directed by: Lewis Allen; László Benedek; Robert Florey; Peter Godfrey; Christian Nyby; Arthur Hiller; Don Taylor; Peter Tewksbury
- Presented by: John Nesbitt (1956); Frank C. Baxter (1957–1958)
- Theme music composer: Leon Klatzkin
- Country of origin: United States
- Original language: English
- No. of seasons: 3
- No. of episodes: 81

Production
- Executive producers: Jerry Stagg; Hal Roach Jr.
- Camera setup: Single-camera
- Running time: 25 mins.

Original release
- Network: CBS (1956); ABC (1957–1958)
- Release: April 8, 1956 – April 1, 1958

Telephone Time is an American anthology drama series that aired on CBS in 1956, and on ABC from 1957 to 1958. The series features plays adapted from short stories by John Nesbitt who hosted the first season. Frank C. Baxter became the host effective with the September 10, 1957, episode. He hosted the 1957 and 1958 seasons. A total of 81 episodes aired from April 1956 to March 1957 on CBS, and from April 1957 to April 1958 on ABC. The Bell Telephone System sponsored the series. Developed and produced during the Golden Age of Television, the series was creatively driven by executive producer Jerry Stagg, who was responsible for packaging its high-profile Hollywood casting and literary adaptations.

== Overview ==
The program showcased the talents of actors and actresses such as Alma Lawton, Bette Davis, Florenz Ames, Greer Garson, Dennis Morgan, Joseph Cotten, Claudette Colbert, Michael Landon, Cloris Leachman, Johnny Crawford, Robert Anderson, Katherine Warren, Joel Grey, Fay Wray, Thomas Mitchell, Vivi Janiss, Wright King, Strother Martin, Lon Chaney Jr., Boris Karloff, John Carradine, Helen Wallace, and Michael Winkelman. Famed circus performer Emmett Kelly made his dramatic debut in the presentation Captain from Kopenick. Michael Raffetto appeared in the "Vicksburg, 5:35 PM" episode as Joe Palermo (1956).

== Award nomination ==
Nesbitt was nominated for an Emmy Award in 1957 for Best Teleplay Writing - Half Hour or Less.

== Episodes ==
- 1.01 The Golden Junkman - April 8, 1956 - Chaney
- 1.02 Man With A Beard
- 1.03 Captain From Kopenick
- 1.04 Borders Away
- 1.05 The Mystery of Caspar Hauser
- 1.06 The Stepmother
- 1.07 Time Bomb
- 1.08 Emperor Norton's Bridge
- 1.09 The Man Who Believed In Fairy Tales
- 1.10 Harry In Search of Himself
- 1.11 Felix the Fourth
- 1.12 Smith of Ecuador
- 1.13 The Gingerbread Man
- 1.14 Joyful Lunatic
- 1.15 The Key
- 1.16 Grandpa Changes the World
- 1.17 Again the Stars
- 2.01 Keeley's Wonderful Machine
- 2.02 I Am Not Alone
- 2.03 Mr. and Mrs. Browning
- 2.04 Vicksburg, 5:35 P.M.
- 2.05 The Churchill Club
- 2.06 She Sette Her Little Foote
- 2.07 Hatfield, the Rainmaker
- 2.08 She Also Ran
- 2.09 Knockout
- 2.10 Chico and the Archbishop
- 2.11 Raccoon Hunt
- 2.12 Fortunatus
- 2.13 Scio, Ohio
- 2.14 The Sergeant Boyd Story
- 2.15 The Mountain That Moved
- 2.16 Passport To Life
- 2.17 The Jumping Parson
- 2.18 Parents Of A Stranger
- 2.19 The Consort - January 27, 1957 - Alan Napier
- 2.20 The Man Who Discovered O. Henry
- 2.21 The Greatest Man in the World
- 2.22 The Unsinkable Molly Brown - February 24, 1957 - Leachman
- 2.23 The Intruder
- 2.24 Fight For The Title - George Brenlin, Landon
- 2.25 Escape
- 2.26 Castle Dangerous
- 2.27 Bullet Lou Kirn
- 2.28 Elfego Baca - April 18, 1957 - Manuel Rojas
- 2.29 Rabbi On Wheels
- 2.30 The Diamond Peer
- 2.31 Stranded - Davis
- 2.32 Plot To Save A Boy
- 2.33 Line Chief
- 2.34 Pit-a-Pit and the Dragon
- 2.35 The Koshetz Story
- 3.01 Revenge - September 10, 1957 - Garson, Ames, Grant Richards
- 3.02 Here Lies Francois Gold
- 3.03 Campaign For Marriage
- 3.04 The Gadfly - Mitchell
- 3.05 Hole In The Wall
- 3.06 The Man The Navy Couldn't Sink
- 3.07 Under Seventeen
- 3.08 The Other Van Gogh
- 3.09 Arithmetic Sailor
- 3.10 I Get Along Without You Very Well
- 3.11 Alice's Wedding Gown - November 19, 1957 - Wray
- 3.12 The Rescue
- 3.13 Novel Appeal
- 3.14 Sam Houston's Decision
- 3.15 The Frying Pan
- 3.16 A Picture of the Magi
- 3.17 Death Of A Nobody
- 3.18 Abby, Julia and the Seven Pet Cows
- 3.19 Cavalry Surgeon
- 3.20 A Stubborn Fool
- 3.21 Flight For Life
- 3.22 The Immortal Eye
- 3.23 Recipe For Success
- 3.24 The Checkered Flag
- 3.25 The Vestris - February 25, 1958 -Torin Thatcher, Karloff
- 3.26 War Against War
- 3.27 The Quality of Mercy - March 11, 1958 - Harry Towne
- 3.28 Man of Principle
- 3.29 Trail Blazer

== Production ==
Hal Roach Jr. and Jerry Stagg were the producers. The program was directed by Arthur Hiller, Robert Florey, and Lewis Allen. Writers included Donald S. Sanford.

The CBS version was broadcast on Sundays from 6 to 6:30 p.m. Eastern Time. Bell's dissatisfaction with that time slot led to the change in networks. It had asked CBS in December 1956 to move the program to a later time. The ABC version initially was on Thursdays from 10 to 10:30 p.m. E. T. In June 1957 it was moved to Tuesdays from 9:30 to 10 p.m. E. T.

== Critical response ==
A review of the episode "Revenge" in the trade publication Billboard described it as "slickly produced" but added that it "suffered from over simplification of the basic issues, which resulted in scene punchlines and plot twists telegraphed well in advance."
