= Frank C. Baxter =

American scholar and television personality

Professor Frank C. Baxter Litt.D.
- Baxter in Our Mr. Sun
- Born: Francis Condie Baxter; May 4, 1896; Newbold, New Jersey, U.S.
- Died: January 18, 1982 (aged 85); Pasadena, California, U.S.
- Education: University of Pennsylvania (B.S., M.S.); Cambridge University (Litt.D.)
- Occupations: Educator, Actor
- Employer: University of Southern California
- Known for: Educational television
- Notable work: The Bell System Science Series
- Television: Our Mr. Sun, Hemo the Magnificent, An Age of Kings, Telephone Time, Shakespeare on TV, The Bell Telephone Hour, Renaissance on TV, Now and Then, The Written Word, The Four Winds to Adventure, Our Heritage
- Title: Professor
- Spouse: Lydia Foulke Spencer Morris
- Children: Lydia Morris Baxter (b. 1929); Francis Condie Baxter, Jr. (b. 1930)

Francis Condie Baxter (May 4, 1896 – January 18, 1982) was an American scholar and television personality. An authority on Shakespeare with a doctorate in literature from Cambridge University, he was a highly popular professor of English Literature at the University of Southern California who brought literature, science, and the arts to millions in the United States via television and film.

Baxter hosted the Emmy Award-winning CBS series Shakespeare on TV beginning in 1954, as well as the ABC drama series Telephone Time in 1957 and 1958, the U.S. broadcast of the BBC's 15-part presentation of Shakespeare's history plays, An Age of Kings, in 1961, and NBC's The Bell Telephone Hour throughout the 1960s. Additional Baxter television series for CBS included Renaissance on TV (1956–57), devoted to classical philosophy, literature, and art, and Now and Then (1954–55), which enlightened viewers on subjects ranging from Altimira cave drawings to Elizabethan naval battles. Baxter's Emmy Award-winning Harvest on NBC in the mid-1950s highlighted great achievements in art, literature, public affairs, and science. In 1966, Baxter hosted a popular TV series called The Four Winds to Adventure, featuring filmmakers exploring little-known areas of the world, crossing continents and oceans to explore the histories and customs of local people or the animals unique to a particular region. The Written Word, a 15-part series on the history of books and printing featuring Baxter as presenter, aired nationwide in 1958 on both educational and commercial networks including ABC. Baxter was a frequent guest star on TV shows in the 1950s and 60s, often portraying himself since he was so well known throughout America. His TV acting credits included The George Burns and Gracie Allen Show, Playhouse 90, The Tennessee Ernie Ford Show, Mr. Novak, and more than a dozen others.

Baxter is best known for his role as "Dr. Research" in The Bell System Science Series. The programs were first broadcast on national television and subsequently distributed, free of charge, to schools across the United States. The films were later released on home video and DVD. Over the more than 30 years they were in popular use, Baxter biographer Eric Niderost estimates, the films were seen by some 200 million students.

== Biography ==
Born in Newbold, New Jersey, Baxter served as a medical corpsman in the American Expeditionary Force in France under General John Pershing during World War I. Following his war service, Baxter enrolled in the University of Pennsylvania, where he studied zoology and archeology, graduating summa cum laude in 1923. Two years later he earned a master's degree in English from the same institution, simultaneously performing teaching duties that he had first undertaken as an undergraduate. Beginning in 1926, he took on part-time work as a lecturer at Swarthmore College and as a radio broadcaster on WOO in Philadelphia, regaling listeners (according to his self-deprecating description) with narratives about "split infinitives and the simple life."

In 1927, Baxter married Lydia Morris, who had been his student at Penn and would be his wife for 55 years until he died. That same year, he and his new bride sailed to England, where he would begin work on his doctorate in English Literature at Trinity College, Cambridge. With his coursework for the degree completed, but dissertation still in progress, he returned to America in 1929 and began teaching at the University of California - Berkeley. Almost immediately he was recruited to Los Angeles by the University of Southern California, where he began teaching in 1930. Following the completion of his dissertation titled "Criticism and Appreciation of the Elizabethan Drama, 1642-1892" and the award of his doctorate from Cambridge in 1932, he was promoted to assistant professor of English Literature. USC would be his home for over 30 years, until his retirement in 1961.

At USC, Baxter became an enormously popular teacher and lecturer. Beginning in the 1930s, he began an annual tradition of public readings at Christmas time, delivered to an oversubscribed 1,500-seat auditorium in USC's Founders Hall that spilled out to include an audience of hundreds more on the lawn outside, who listened via loudspeaker. By 1949 these dramatic readings were nationally famous, prompting Time magazine to send a reporter to cover the event. Time expressed amazement that even though it was raining for the 1949 performance, the overflow crowds were still there to fill the lawn outside. The USC campus newspaper, the Daily Trojan, reported that a student poll voted Baxter as the professor who should "teach all the classes in the university." The newspaper opined, "If you haven't taken Dr. Baxter, you haven't been to college."

Baxter is best remembered for his nationally televised appearances from 1956 to 1962 as "Dr. Research" in The Bell System Science Series. Starring Baxter alongside Eddie Albert, Lionel Barrymore, Richard Carlson, Mel Blanc, Hans Conried, and Richard Deacon, the films were directed by Hollywood legends Frank Capra and Jack Warner and featured academic advisors including renowned Caltech physicist Richard Feynman. Following nationwide broadcast in the United States, these films were distributed without charge to schools, becoming a staple in American classrooms from the 1960s through the 1980s. The programs combined scientific footage, live actors, and animation to convey scientific concepts and history in a lively, entertaining way, with the bald, bespectacled, and affable Baxter playing the role of the omniscient scientist who both explains and discovers along with the audience. As a result of the films, Baxter (who in real life was a USC English professor and had not been a scientist since the early days of his academic career at the University of Pennsylvania) became an almost universally-known scientific icon among Baby Boomers. All of Baxter's films in The Bell System Science Series have been released on VHS and DVD and continue to reach new audiences.

Throughout the 1950s and 1960s, Baxter not only hosted several nationally televised series, but also played cameo roles in numerous dramas and comedies, in each case designed to play off of his persona as a celebrity academic. For example, on NBC's Peabody Award-winning drama series Mr. Novak, based upon an idealistic English teacher in Los Angeles who often became involved in the lives of his students and fellow faculty, Baxter played an industrialist giving out a scholarship. On the NBC afternoon game show You Don't Say, he was a guest panelist alongside Dr. Joyce Brothers.

Baxter's mass media credits also include one feature film, a science fiction-horror romp of the sort popular in the 1950s in which he appeared as himself, presumably to lend credibility to the incredible plot. The Mole People, released in theaters nationwide in 1956, is premised upon the discovery of a race of albino beings who shun light, and rely upon mutant mole men as their slaves. In a deliberately stilted professorial presentation, Baxter presents a brief history of theories of life beneath the surface of the earth. In the ensuing decades the film has earned cult status, enjoying successive reincarnations on VHS, DVD, and in 2019, Blu-ray.

After retiring from teaching in 1961 at the age of 65, Baxter continued to perform in starring roles in made-for-television documentaries, as well as in cameo roles on television dramas, comedies, and variety shows. He maintained his old office at USC, where for eight years he had been Chairman of the English Department and President of the Faculty Senate, and even into his 80s he continued to hold court on campus as "Reader in Residence." His famed Noon Readings, occasional lectures, and annual Christmas presentations in Bovard Hall were so popular they were news items in the Los Angeles Times, announced with headlines such as "Dr. Frank Baxter Will Visit USC."

Baxter's success as an educator, both on the individual student level and before mass audiences, was summed up in a Daily Trojan editorial at the time of his retirement. "Dr. Baxter works so well with the student mind," the editors wrote, "because he is part scholar, part teacher, and part actor." While many academics can claim success as both scholars and teachers, few combine it with genuine acting talent — and it was this extra ingredient that so impressed his loyal following. "Dr. Baxter is most certainly a fine actor," the Daily Trojan opined, who "can make plays come to life — whether they be Shakespeare, Shaw, or Arthur Miller — by merely recreating a scene. He can give a character meaning — whether it be Falstaff or Henry Higgins or Willy Loman — with a simple gesture of his hands. And he can create almost any emotion, from laughter to tears, simply by the reading of a single line."

Baxter died in 1982 in Pasadena, California; he was 85.

== Awards ==
- Baxter won seven Emmy Awards, including in 1954 for Outstanding Male Performer, and in 1960 for Outstanding Male Personality.
- Baxter has a star on the Hollywood Walk of Fame.
- In 1959, Baxter won the inaugural Golden Gavel award of Toastmasters International.
- Baxter won the Peabody Award in 1956.
- In 1955, Baxter was awarded an honorary degree from the University of Southern California.

== Selected filmography ==
Except as noted, this filmography is based on the credits listed at the Internet Movie Database.

- Shakespeare on TV (television series - 1953)
- The Mole People (1956)
- The George Burns and Gracie Allen Show (TV series) - a 1956 episode titled The Shakespeare Paper
- Our Mr. Sun (1956)
- Hemo the Magnificent (1957)
- Telephone Time (host for 28 episodes of a weekly television series - 1957,1958)
- The Strange Case of the Cosmic Rays (1957)
- Meteora: The Unchained Goddess (1958)
- Gateways to the Mind (1958)
- The Alphabet Conspiracy (1959)
- Thread of Life (1960)
- An Age of Kings (commentary for a 1961 Shakespeare series)
- About Time (1962)
- Four Winds to Adventure (host for 39 episodes of a weekly television series - 1966)
