= Our Mr. Sun =

1956 television film by Frank Capra

- Genre: Educational
- Based on: Our Sun by Donald Howard Menzel
- Written by: Frank Capra
- Directed by: Frank Capra; William T. Hurtz (animation director)
- Starring: Eddie Albert; Dr. Frank C. Baxter
- Theme music composer: Samuel Hoffman
- Country of origin: United States
- Original language: English

Production
- Producer: Frank Capra
- Cinematography: Harold E. Wellman
- Editor: Frank P. Keller
- Running time: 54 minutes

Original release
- Network: CBS
- Release: November 19, 1956

Related
- Hemo the Magnificent

Our Mr. Sun is a 1956 one-hour American television film in Technicolor written, produced, and directed by Frank Capra, with animation by UPA. It is a documentary that explains how the Sun works and how it also plays a huge part in human life. It was first broadcast on television by CBS in 1956.

The film starred Frank Baxter as "Dr. Research", and Eddie Albert as "the fiction writer", the other recurring character in The Bell Laboratory Science Series. Marvin Miller voiced the animated Sun. Sterling Holloway, who was uncredited, voiced an animated version of chlorophyll. The film is notable as the last project of actor Lionel Barrymore, who provided the voice of Father Time. The film was first broadcast on television two years after Barrymore's death in 1954.

Our Mr. Sun and a companion film, Hemo the Magnificent (about blood circulation), were popular favorites for showing in primary and secondary school science classrooms from the late 1950s until the early 1980s. The film is currently available on DVD with another Frank C. Baxter film, The Strange Case of the Cosmic Rays (1957).

== Synopsis ==
The film opens with Dr. Research (Dr. Frank C. Baxter) and the Fiction Writer (Eddie Albert) meeting Father Time (Lionel Barrymore) and Mr. Sun (Marvin Miller) who explain that time started a few billion years ago and that the Sun is a star. Mr. Sun explains that he was worshipped as various gods (Shamash, Mithra, Ra and Apollo) until Anaxagoras proclaimed the Sun was a very hot stone and not a god. Logic and reasoning were the beginning of the end of worshiping the Sun as algebra and the astrolabe were used to study the heavens.

Dr. Research explains that the Sun is 93 million miles away and its light takes 8 minutes to reach the Earth. Light from the next closest star, Alpha Centauri, takes more than 4 years to get to Earth at a speed greater than 186,000 miles per second. The Sun weighs the same as about 330,000 Earths and is 95% hydrogen and helium gas and is not solid. The Sun is compressed by gravity so tightly that the gas at the center is more than 100 times heavier than water with a pressure of one billion tons per square inch while the surface is about one pound per square inch. The center of the Sun is 30 million degrees Fahrenheit while the surface is only 10,000 degrees, but the corona is 1 million degrees Fahrenheit though nobody knows why, so scientists study the Sun's corona during each solar eclipse.

Dr. George Ellery Hale and Dr. Henri Deslandres both developed the spectroheliograph—independently—to study the Sun in different wavelengths of light related to specific atoms. Dr. Robert R. McMath of the McMath–Hulbert Observatory used a spectroheliograph to make time-lapse films of the prominences on the Sun. Using pictures from the Mount Wilson Observatory, and others, scientists have learned about sunspots first described by Galileo. Sunspots often appear in pairs and are about 7,000 degrees rather than the normal 10,000 degrees. The spots increase and decrease in a cycle of about 11.2 years. Studying sunspots has shown the equator rotates faster than the poles at around 25 and 1/3 days per rotation. Halfway between the equator and the poles takes about 27 and 1/2 days per rotation though nobody understands why.

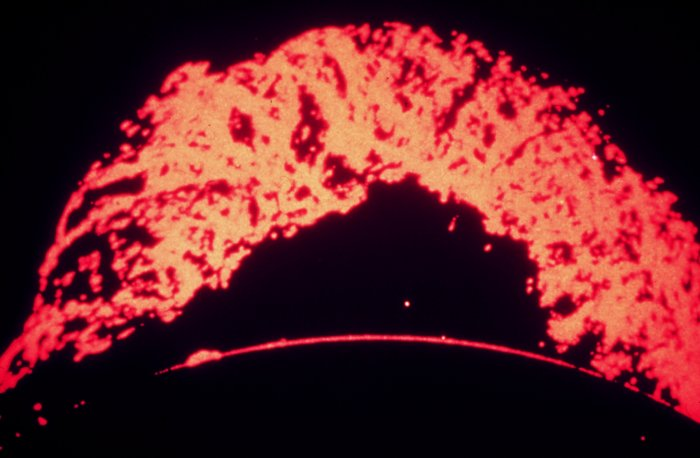
The Great Eruptive Solar Prominence of June 4, 1946

Dr. Bernard Lyot developed the first coronagraph to study the Sun's corona. Improved coronagraphs are used at the High Altitude Observatory by Dr. Walter Roberts and at the Evans Solar Facility by Dr. J. W. Evans. Dr. Donald H. Menzel was the first to use the coronagraph in America. These coronagraphs are used to film structures on the Sun called prominences and spicules which show matter flowing on the surface in structures many times the size of the Earth. Often matter appears from nowhere to flow down into a sunspot which is sometimes referred to as Coronal Rain. The largest recorded prominence was captured at the High Altitude Observatory in Colorado on June 4, 1946 as it left the Sun at 400,000 miles per hour.

The Sun is also studied in radio frequencies using radio astronomy. Dr. E. G. Bowen helped pioneer radio astronomy which showed that many places in outer space emit radio waves.

When solar flares erupt from sunspots they emit ultraviolet radiation, which reach the Earth in 8 minutes, and electrified fragments of atoms which take around 30 hours. These fragments of atoms are diverted by the Earth's magnetic field, towards the North and South poles which causes the Aurora. Dr. C. W. Gartlein of Cornell University took some of the first motion pictures of the Aurora Borealis. These solar flares cause disruption in electricity and radio communications because of disturbances of the ionosphere. Because of this, the Sun is monitored from 22 stations around the world which send data to the Radio Storm Warning Service of the National Bureau of Standards to determine when a solar storm will reach the Earth.

The Earth receives one billion dollars of solar energy from the Sun every second when the rate is $0.02 per kilowatt-hour. The Earth receives only one two-billionth of the total energy output by the Sun, which is about 500,000,000,000,000,000,000,000 horsepower. The Sun generates this energy through thermonuclear reactions roughly equal to 10,000 hydrogen bombs going off every second and has been doing so for the last 4 billion years. Dr. Hans Bethe, in 1938, was the first to determine this fact. Every second, the Sun converts 564 million tons of hydrogen into 560 million tons of helium with the remaining 4 million tons being converted into energy in the form of light, heat and radiation.

Thermo the Magician enters to explain the carbon cycle whereby hydrogen atoms are converted into helium atoms by fusion reactions with carbon atoms. At 30 million degrees, one hydrogen and one carbon combine into nitrogen. Adding two hydrogens to the nitrogen creates oxygen. The oxygen combines with another hydrogen to create helium and carbon, and in the process releases energy. Dr. Research then mentions combining two hydrogen atoms directly into a helium atom in the proton-proton process.

Dr. Research continues, telling how science believes the Sun started as a loose cloud of hydrogen gas compressed by gravity and this compression raised the temperature until it reached 30 million degrees and started the thermonuclear reaction. The nuclear reactions expand the Sun and gravity compresses it until the two forces reach a balance. The Sun has only used small portion of its hydrogen and has about 98% of it left which will take about 50 to 100 billion years until it is gone and the Sun dies.

Science is depending on the Sun for the solution to man's two biggest problems, the first problem being food. The population of the Earth went from 500 million in 1650 to 2.5 billion in 1950. One out of every twenty human beings that ever existed, is currently alive today. Two out of every three people don't have enough to eat which is required for good health and 100 million new humans are born each year becoming a population explosion.

Food is grown by the Sun through photosynthesis, which means putting together with light. Ninety-nine percent of all food and fuel is created by the Sun through photosynthesis. Chlorophyll is the molecule responsible for photosynthesis though science isn't exactly sure how it works. They believe chlorophyll uses sunlight to combine carbon dioxide molecules with water molecules, along with salts, to create sugars and release oxygen. These sugars form the bulk of a plant including its fruit. Most of these plants are grown in the sea as phytoplankton, which is the food source of zooplankton, which are eaten by fish. All animals survive on food created by the Sun through photosynthesis; either directly by eating plants, or indirectly by eating animals that eat plants. The Sun provided the energy for photosynthesis through its light, which was created at the Sun's core. It takes this light 2000 years to make it from the core to the Sun's surface and another eight minutes from the Sun's surface to the Earth.

The food problem is being studied by Dr. Hiroshi Tamiya of the Tokugawa Biological Institute in his research on chlorella, an algae consisting of carbohydrates, fats and 50% protein. Chlorella can produce about 10 times the edible material, per unit area, as a typical crop.

The second biggest problem man faces is that of fuel. In 1850, the average American used 400 horsepower-hours of fuel. By 1950, the average American used 10,000 horsepower-hours of fuel. It's estimated that by 1975 an average American will use 20,000 horsepower-hours of fuel. Solar energy will be a likely solution and research by Dr. Charles Greeley Abbot produced a solar powered engine. The French solar furnace at Mont-Louis is used for high-temperature research of metals. The Indian scientist Dr. S. Bhatnagar experimented with solar ovens for cooking food and Dr. Mária Telkes developed a home that used Solar heating exclusively.

Research is being conducted by Dr. Lawrence J. Heidt of MIT using sunlight along with perchloric acid to decompose water into hydrogen and oxygen so that it can be burned to produce energy. The waste product would be water that can be fed back into the system to create a continuous loop powered by solar energy. Dr. E. I. Rabinowitz developed a photogalvanic cell using thiamine and iron salts while working at MIT. Thermocouples and phosphorescent wallpaper are other possible solutions to certain energy needs. Atomic power plants and especially breeder reactors can also provide some energy needs. In the end though, solar power will be the only solution on a long-term scale; otherwise society will have to go back to a muscle-powered existence as it was when humans and animals provided the energy to run things.

Ironically, although the photovoltaic cell had been invented at Bell Labs two years before the film was made, it was not included in the original version of the film. It was added, however, in a slightly updated version of the film, where the "solar battery" is discussed. Based on the work of scientists Daryl Chapin, Calvin Fuller, and Gerald Pearson at Bell Labs, this device can turn sunlight directly into electricity. A cartoon version of Dr. Research dressed as a pastry chef shows how the solar battery can be manufactured by "cooking-up" a wafer of silicon with a boron coating. (This became the predecessor of today's ubiquitous solar cells).

The film ends with Dr. Research and Father Time providing an overview. That human curiosity has helped drive scientific achievements and that it's important to ask questions of both science and religion.

== Cast ==
In this first film of the series, there are very few on-screen credits. Eddie Albert, Frank Baxter, Marvin Miller and Lionel Barrymore are the only actors credited on-screen. and the vast majority of the film focuses on these four actors.

A number of the characters are animated and thus played by voice actors. Mr. Sun and Father time are both animated. Along with these two, Chloro Phyll (voiced by Sterling Holloway) and Thermo the Magician are other roles. Dawn is the last of the animated characters and briefly appears at the beginning of the film where she introduces Mr. Sun to tell his story.

There is one other on-screen part going to a man throwing his shoe at a radio when the broadcast is interrupted by sunspots. Three other parts in this segment are for the man's wife, radio announcer Sam Johnson and the radio host that introduces him. These last three are voice only parts and not seen on-screen.

Cast in order of appearance

- Dr. Research, Dr. Frank C. Baxter
- Jim
- The Writer, Eddie Albert
- Father Time, Lionel Barrymore
- Mr. Sun, Marvin Miller
- Dawn
- Radio host introducing Sam Johnson
- Sam Johnson
- Man throwing shoe at radio
- Wife of shoe thrower
- Thermo the Magician
- Chloro Phyll, Sterling Holloway

== Production ==
Our Mr. Sun is the first of nine films in the Bell science series. Production took place over a period of four years and was initiated at the behest of N. W. Ayer & Son, who were AT&T's advertising agency at the time. Working titles for the film included The Sun and Horizons Unlimited with Our Mr. Sun eventually becoming the title. A number of well-known scientists provided technical advice during the production of the film, which was later approved by a Scientific Advisory Board.

Although color television was introduced in 1953, most television content was still in black and white and the fact that Our Mr. Sun was produced in color was noted at the time by The Boston Globe.

== Releases ==
Our Mr. Sun was first broadcast on CBS, during primetime, on November 19, 1956. It was later released—free of charge—as a 16 mm print to educational institutions and libraries. As a result, the film was often shown in school classrooms around the United States.

Decades later, in the 1980s, the film was released to the home video market on VHS tapes. In 1991 Rhino Home Video released the film on the laserdisc CAV format. In 2003, the film was released, along with The Strange Case of the Cosmic Rays, in DVD format by Image Entertainment.

- Our Mr. Sun, film (16 mm, color, 60 minutes), American Telephone and Telegraph Company, OCLC 3367123
- Our Mr. Sun, videotape (VHS, 60 minutes, 198-?), Southerby Productions, OCLC 14781865
- Our Mr. Sun, videotape (VHS, 60 minutes, 1991), Rhino Home Video, OCLC 23952247, ISBN 9781566050005
- Our Mr. Sun, videodisc (Laserdisc, 60 minutes, 1991), Rhino Home Video.
- Our Mr. Sun, and, Strange Case of the Cosmic Rays, videodisc (DVD, 109 minutes, 2003), Image Entertainment, OCLC 53979544
