= Hemo the Magnificent =

1957 educational film

- Genre: Educational
- Written by: Frank Capra
- Directed by: Frank Capra; William T. Hurtz (animation director)
- Starring: Richard Carlson; Dr. Frank C. Baxter
- Country of origin: United States
- Original language: English

Production
- Producer: Frank Capra
- Cinematography: Harold E. Wellman
- Editor: Frank P. Keller
- Running time: 55 minutes

Original release
- Network: CBS
- Release: March 20, 1957

Related
- Our Mr. Sun; The Strange Case of the Cosmic Rays

Hemo the Magnificent is a one-hour Technicolor made-for-television educational film, released in 1957 by Bell Laboratories and directed by Frank Capra, and first telecast by CBS. It details the workings of the circulatory system. It is one program in The Bell System Science Series, a series of nine Bell Telephone science specials telecast in prime time on commercial network television from the late 1950s to the mid-1960s. All but one of these specials starred Prof. Frank C. Baxter; the last of them starred Walt Disney.

== Background ==
Baxter played his usual role as "Dr. Research", the resident scientist in the film series. Richard Carlson played the other recurring character, a writer for television. Several well-known voice artists were employed for the animated sequences, including Marvin Miller as the title character, Hemo. Also appearing were Mel Blanc and June Foray as a squirrel and a deer, respectively. Sterling Holloway appeared in an uncredited role as a lab assistant.

== Reception ==
Although Time magazine gave it an extremely negative review, calling it "condescending" and citing it as an example of how the scientific information was presumably "dumbed down" by including cute cartoon animals, it quickly became a classic of the genre, featuring incredibly detailed television animations for its time.

Hemo the Magnificent and another Bell Laboratories film, Our Mr. Sun, were favorites for showing in school science classrooms.

== Home media ==
The film was released on DVD with another film featuring Dr. Baxter, The Unchained Goddess (1958).

== In popular culture ==
A brief sequence from Hemo the Magnificent is seen in the film Gremlins and also in Disney's Bill Nye the Science Guy. One of the evil gremlins sneaks into a classroom while the science teacher (Glynn Turman) is showing Hemo to the class.

According to screenwriter David Koepp, the 'Mr. DNA' sequence in Jurassic Park was inspired by Hemo the Magnificent.

The film is mentioned in the Freaks and Geeks episode "Discos and Dragons" by the A/V supervisor.
