= Frank Capra =

Italian-born American film director (1897–1991)

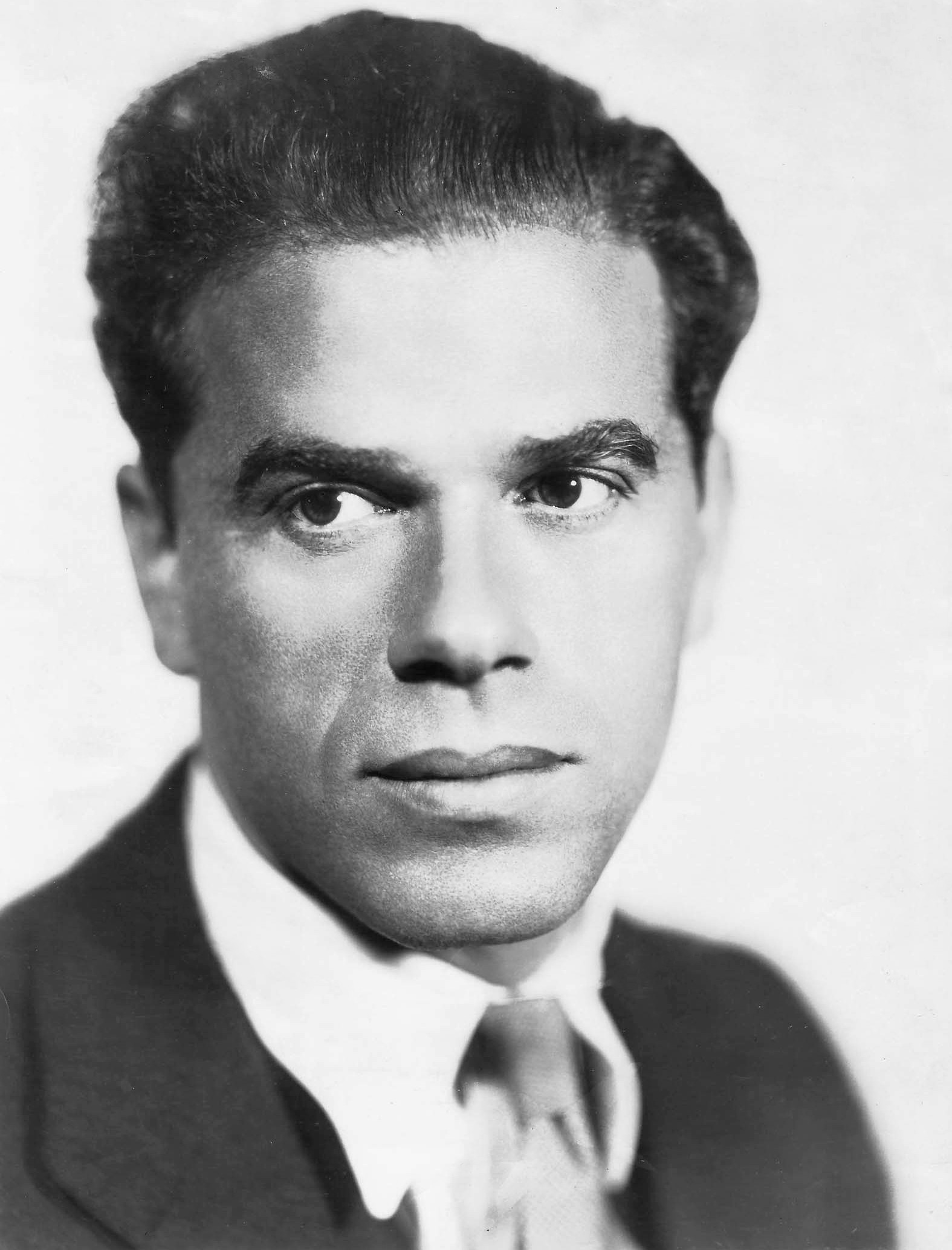
- Capra, c. 1930s
- Born: Francesco Rosario Capra; May 18, 1897; Bisacquino, Sicily, Kingdom of Italy
- Died: September 3, 1991 (aged 94); La Quinta, California, U.S.
- Burial place: Coachella Valley Public Cemetery
- Other name: Frank Russell Capra
- Citizenship: Italy (until 1920); United States (from 1920)
- Education: California Institute of Technology
- Occupations: Film director; producer; screenwriter
- Years active: 1922–1964
- Title: President of the Academy of Motion Picture Arts and Sciences 1935–1939
- Political party: Republican
- Spouses: Helen Howell (m. 1923; div. 1928) Lucille Warner (m. 1932; died 1984)
- Children: 4, including Frank Jr.
- Military career
- Allegiance: United States
- Branch: United States Army
- Service years: 1918; 1941–1945
- Rank: Colonel
- Unit: Army Signal Corps
- Conflicts: World War I World War II

Frank Russell Capra (born Francesco Rosario Capra; May 18, 1897 – September 3, 1991) was an Italian-born American film director, producer, and screenwriter who was the creative force behind several major award-winning films of the 1930s and 1940s. Born in Italy and raised in Los Angeles from the age of five, his rags-to-riches story has led film historians such as Ian Freer to consider him the "American Dream personified".

Capra became one of America's most influential directors during the 1930s, winning three Academy Awards for Best Director from six nominations. Among his leading films were It Happened One Night (1934), Mr. Deeds Goes to Town (1936), You Can't Take It with You (1938), and Mr. Smith Goes to Washington (1939). During World War II, Capra served in the U.S. Army Signal Corps and produced propaganda films, such as the Why We Fight series.

After World War II, Capra's career declined as his later films, such as It's a Wonderful Life (1946), performed poorly when they were first released. Beginning in 1950, his cinematic output slowed, and he retired from filmmaking in the mid-1960s. In the ensuing decades, however, It's a Wonderful Life and other Capra films were reevaluated favorably by critics. Outside of directing, Capra was active in the film industry, engaging in various political and social activities. He served as President of the Academy of Motion Picture Arts and Sciences, worked alongside the Writers Guild of America, and was head of the Directors Guild of America.

== Early life ==
Capra was born Francesco Rosario Capra on May 18, 1897, in Bisacquino, a village near Palermo, Sicily, Italy. He was the youngest of seven children of Salvatore Capra, a fruit grower, and the former Rosaria "Sara" Nicolosi. Capra's family was Roman Catholic. The name "Capra", notes Capra's biographer, Joseph McBride, represents his family's closeness to the land, and means "goat". He notes that the English word "capricious" derives from it, "evoking the animal's skittish temperament", adding that "the name neatly expresses two aspects of Frank Capra's personality: emotionalism and obstinacy."

In 1903, when he was five, Capra's family immigrated to the United States, traveling in a steerage compartment of the steamship Germania—the least expensive way to make the passage. For Capra, the 13-day journey remained one of the worst experiences of his life:

You're all together—you have no privacy. You have a cot. Very few people have trunks or anything that takes up space. They have just what they can carry in their hands or in a bag. Nobody takes their clothes off. There's no ventilation, and it stinks like hell. They're all miserable. It's the most degrading place you could ever be.

Capra remembers the ship's arrival in New York Harbor, where he saw "a statue of a great lady, taller than a church steeple, holding a torch above the land we were about to enter". He recalls his father's exclamation at the sight:

Cicco, look! Look at that! That's the greatest light since the Star of Bethlehem! That's the light of freedom! Remember that. Freedom.

The family settled in Los Angeles's East Side (today Lincoln Heights) on Avenue 18, which Capra described in his autobiography as an Italian "ghetto". Capra's father worked as a fruit picker and young Capra attended Castelar Elementary School and sold newspapers after school for ten years until he graduated from high school. He attended the Manual Arts High School, with Jimmy Doolittle and Lawrence Tibbett as classmates. Instead of working after graduating, as his parents wanted, he enrolled in college.

He worked through college at the California Institute of Technology, playing banjo at nightclubs and taking odd jobs like working at the campus laundry, waiting tables, and cleaning engines at a local power plant. He studied chemical engineering and graduated in the spring of 1918. He initiated into Tau Beta Pi (the National Engineering Honor Society) that same year. Capra later wrote that his college education had "changed his whole viewpoint on life from the viewpoint of an alley rat to the viewpoint of a cultured person".

== World War I and later ==
Soon after graduating from college, Capra was commissioned in the United States Army as a second lieutenant, having completed campus ROTC. In the Army, he taught mathematics to artillerymen at Fort Point, San Francisco. His father died during the war in an accident (1916). In the Army, Capra contracted Spanish flu and was medically discharged to return home to live with his mother. He became a naturalized U.S. citizen in 1920, taking the name Frank Russell Capra. Living at home with his siblings and mother, Capra was the only family member with a college education, yet he was the only one who remained chronically unemployed. After a year without work, seeing how his siblings had steady jobs, he felt he was a failure, which led to bouts of depression.

Chronic abdominal pains were later discovered to have been an undiagnosed burst appendix. After recovering at home, Capra moved out and spent the next few years living in flophouses in San Francisco and hopping freight trains, wandering the Western United States. To support himself, he took odd jobs on farms, as a movie extra, playing poker, and selling local oil well stocks.

During this time the 24-year-old Capra directed a 32-minute documentary film titled La Visita Dell'Incrociatore Italiano Libya a San Francisco ("The Visit of The Italian Cruiser Libya to San Francisco"). Not only did it document the visit of the Italian naval vessel Libya to San Francisco, but also the reception given to the crew of the ship by San Francisco's L'Italia Virtus Club, now known as the San Francisco Italian Athletic Club.

At 25, Capra took a job selling books written and published by American philosopher Elbert Hubbard. Capra recalled that he "hated being a peasant, being a scrounging new kid trapped in the Sicilian ghetto of Los Angeles. ... All I had was cockiness—and let me tell you that gets you a long way."

== Career ==
=== Silent film comedies ===
During his time selling books, Capra read a newspaper article about a new movie studio opening in an abandoned gymnasium, at San Francisco. Capra called on them saying he had moved from Hollywood and falsely implied that he had experience in the budding film industry. Capra's only prior exposure in films was in 1915 while attending Manual Arts High School. The studio's founder, Walter Montague, was nonetheless impressed by Capra and offered him $75 to direct a one-reel silent film. Capra, with the help of a cameraman, made the film, Fultah Fisher's Boarding House, in two days and cast it with amateurs. It was made for $1,700 and was sold to Pathé Exchange for $3,500.

critics noted that it was free from stunts, mannerisms, camera angles and Hollywood tricks. It had to be free from them as Capra never had time to learn anything of them. – Alva Johnston

After that first serious job in film, Capra began efforts to finding similar openings in the film industry. He took a position with Paul Gerson Pictures Corporation, Paul Gerson's minor San Francisco studio, as a property man.

In 1923, on Thanksgiving Day, after returning to San Francisco, from Burlingame, Santa Cruz Mountains, and La Honda, after filming Getting Her Man, Frank Capra married Helen Howell attended by Tom Gibson, Ora Carew, and other actors. Capra's father-in-law, William A. Howell, was a principal investor in Paul Gerson Pictures Corporation.

Capra subsequently received an offer to work with producer Harry Cohn at his new studio in Los Angeles. During this time, he worked as a property man, film cutter, title writer, and assistant director.

Capra later became a gag writer for Hal Roach's Our Gang series. He was twice hired as a writer for a slapstick comedy director, Mack Sennett, in 1918 and 1924. Under him, Capra wrote scripts for comedian Harry Langdon and produced by Mack Sennett, the first being Plain Clothes in 1925. According to Capra, it was he who invented Langdon's character, the innocent fool living in a "naughty world"; however, Langdon was well into this character by 1925.

When Langdon eventually left Sennett to make longer, feature-length movies with First National Studios, he took Capra along as his personal writer and director. They made three feature films together during 1926 and 1927, all of them successful with critics and the public. The films made Langdon a recognized comedian in the caliber of Charlie Chaplin and Buster Keaton. Following the production of Long Pants (1927), Capra argued with Langdon over the direction his next project would take. Langdon's other confidant was writer-director Arthur Ripley, a fellow Sennett alumnus, and Langdon followed Ripley's suggestions. Capra quit, and the split was disastrous for Langdon, who took matters into his own hands and directed his films himself, to poor reception.

After Capra split with Langdon, he directed a picture for First National, For the Love of Mike (1927). This was a silent comedy about three bickering godfathers—a German, a Jew, and an Irishman—starring a budding actress, Claudette Colbert. The movie was considered a failure and is a lost film.

=== Columbia Pictures ===
Capra returned to Harry Cohn's studio, now named Columbia Pictures, which was then producing short films and two-reel comedies for "fillers" to play between main features. Columbia was one of many start-up studios on "Poverty Row" in Los Angeles. Like the others, Columbia was unable to compete with larger studios, which often had their own production facilities, distribution, and theaters. Cohn rehired Capra in 1928 to help his studio produce new, full-length feature films, to compete with the major studios. Capra eventually directed 20 films for Cohn's studio, including many of his classics.

Because of Capra's engineering education, he adapted more easily to the new sound technology than most directors. He welcomed the transition to sound, recalling, "I wasn't at home in silent films." Most studios were unwilling to invest in the new sound technology, assuming it was a passing fad. Many in Hollywood considered sound a threat to the industry and hoped it would pass quickly; McBride notes that "Capra was not one of them." When he saw Al Jolson singing in The Jazz Singer in 1927, considered the first talkie, Capra recalled his reaction:

It was an absolute shock to hear this man open his mouth and a song come out of it. It was one of those once-in-a-lifetime experiences.

Few of the studio heads or crew were aware of Capra's engineering background until he began directing The Younger Generation in 1929. The chief cinematographer who worked with Capra on a number of films was likewise unaware. He describes this early period in sound for film:

It wasn't something that came up. You had to bluff to survive. When sound first came in, nobody knew much about it. We were all walking around in the dark. Even the sound man didn't know much about it. Frank lived through it. But he was quite intelligent. He was one of the few directors who knew what the hell they were doing. Most of your directors walked around in a fog—they didn't know where the door was.

During his first year with Columbia, Capra directed nine films, some of which were successful. After the first few, Harry Cohn said: "it was the beginning of Columbia making a better quality of pictures." According to Barson, "Capra became ensconced as Harry Cohn's most trusted director." His films soon established Capra as a "bankable" director known throughout the industry, and Cohn raised Capra's initial salary of $1,000 per film to $25,000 per year. Capra directed a film for MGM during this period, but soon realized he "had much more freedom under Harry Cohn's benevolent dictatorship", where Cohn also put Capra's "name above the title" of his films, a first for the movie industry. Capra wrote of this period and recalled the confidence that Cohn placed in Capra's vision and directing:

I owed Cohn a lot—I owed him my whole career. So I had respect for him, and a certain amount of love. Despite his crudeness and everything else, he gave me my chance. He took a gamble on me.

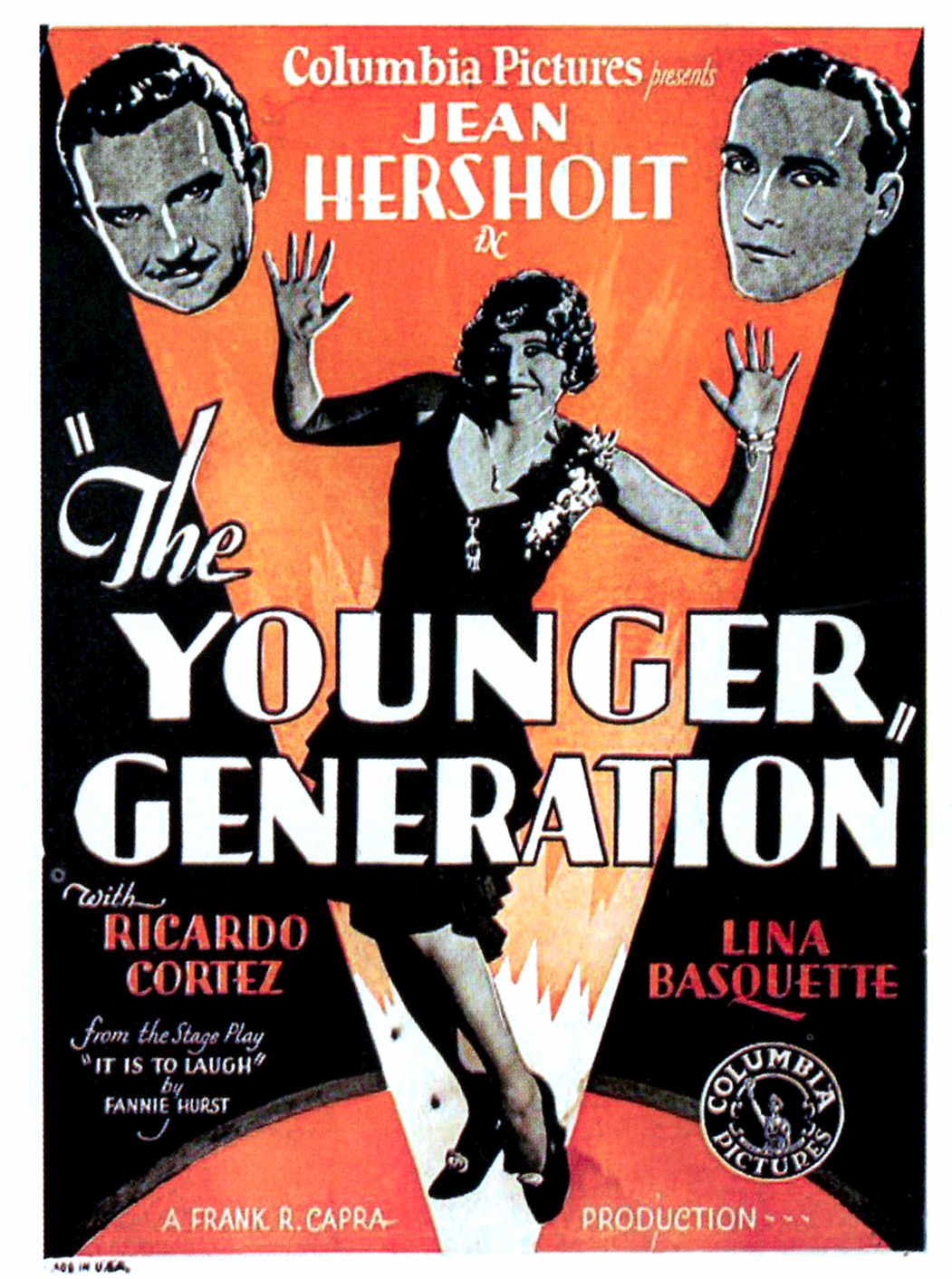
The Younger Generation (1929)

Capra directed his first "real" sound picture, The Younger Generation, in 1929. It was a rags-to-riches romantic comedy about a Jewish family's upward mobility in New York City, with their son later trying to deny his Jewish roots to keep his rich, gentile girlfriend. According to Capra biographer Joseph McBride, Capra "obviously felt a strong identification with the story of a Jewish immigrant who grows up in the ghetto of New York ... and feels he has to deny his ethnic origins to rise to success in America." Capra, however, denied any connection of the story with his own life.

Nonetheless, McBride insists that The Younger Generation abounds with parallels to Capra's own life. McBride notes the "devastatingly painful climactic scene", where the young social-climbing son, embarrassed when his wealthy new friends first meet his parents, passes his mother and father off as house servants. That scene, notes McBride, "echoes the shame Capra admitted feeling toward his own family as he rose in social status".

During his years at Columbia, Capra worked often with screenwriter Robert Riskin (husband of Fay Wray), and cameraman Joseph Walker. In many of Capra's films, the wise-cracking and sharp dialogue was often written by Riskin, and he and Capra went on to become Hollywood's "most admired writer-director team".

=== Film career (1934–1941) ===
==== It Happened One Night (1934) ====
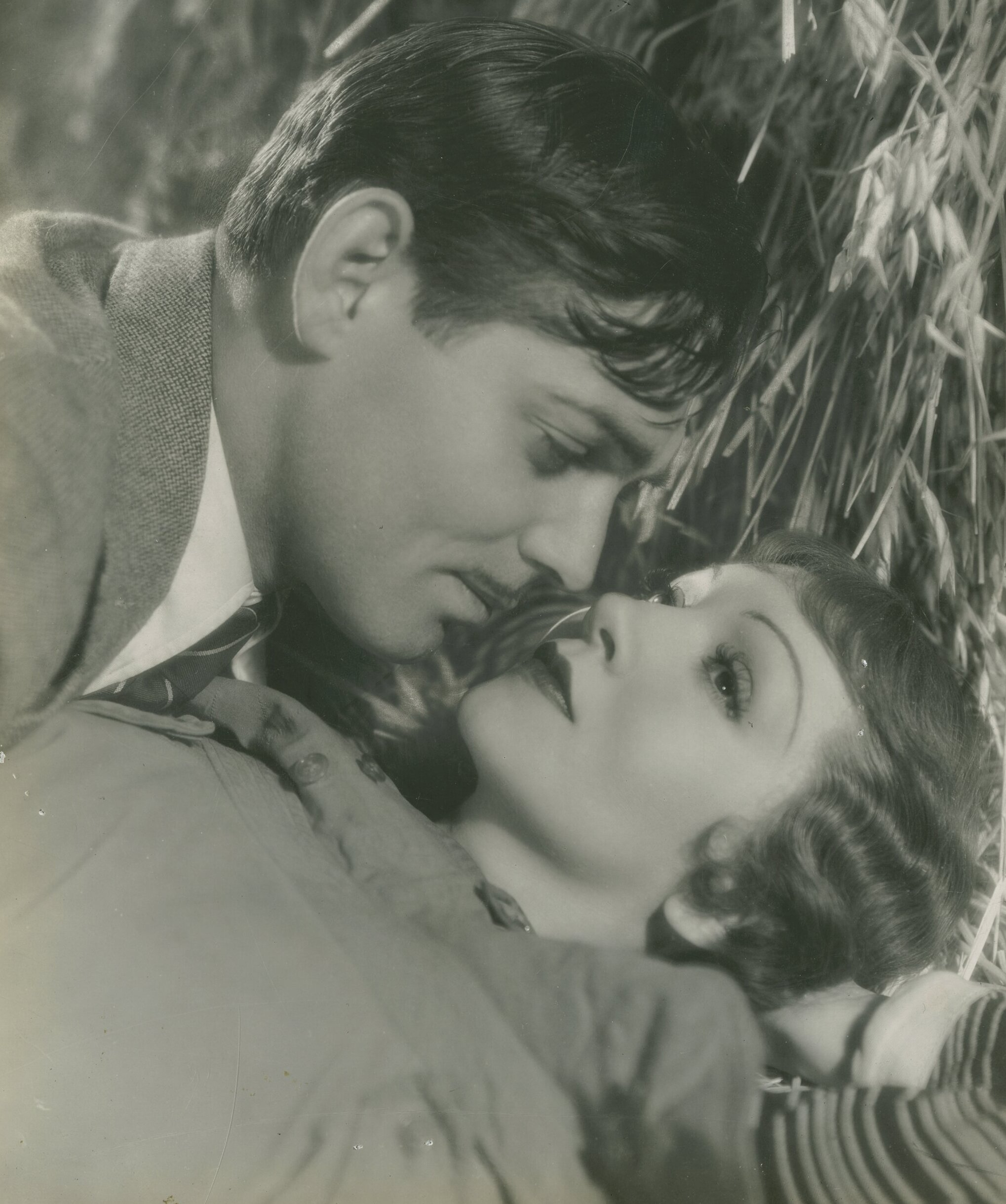
Clark Gable and Claudette Colbert in It Happened One Night (1934)

Capra's films in the 1930s enjoyed immense success at the Academy Awards. It Happened One Night (1934) became the first film to win all five top Oscars (Best Picture, Best Director, Best Actor, Best Actress, and Best Adapted Screenplay). Written by Robert Riskin, it is one of the first screwball comedies, and with its release in the Great Depression, critics considered it an escapist story and a celebration of the American Dream. The film established the names of Capra, Columbia Pictures, and stars Clark Gable and Claudette Colbert in the movie industry. The film has been called "picaresque". It was one of the earliest road movies and inspired variations on that theme by other filmmakers.

He followed the film with Broadway Bill (1934), a screwball comedy about horse racing. The film was a turning point for Capra, however, as he began to conceive an additional dimension to his movies. Capra explains his new thinking:

My films must let every man, woman, and child know that God loves them, that I love them, and that peace and salvation will become a reality only when they all learn to love each other.

This added goal was inspired after meeting with a Christian Scientist friend who told him to view his talents in a different way:

The talents you have, Mr. Capra, are not your own, not self-acquired. God gave you those talents; they are his gifts to you, to use for his purpose.

Capra began to embody messages in subsequent films, many of which conveyed "fantasies of goodwill". The first of those was Mr. Deeds Goes to Town (1936), for which Capra won his second Best Director Oscar. Critic Alistair Cooke observed that Capra was "starting to make movies about themes instead of people".

In 1938, Capra won his third Director Oscar in five years for You Can't Take It with You, which also won Best Picture. In addition to his three directing wins, Capra received directing nominations for three other films (Lady for a Day, Mr. Smith Goes to Washington, and It's a Wonderful Life). On May 5, 1936, Capra hosted the 8th Academy Awards ceremony.

==== Mr. Smith Goes to Washington (1939) ====
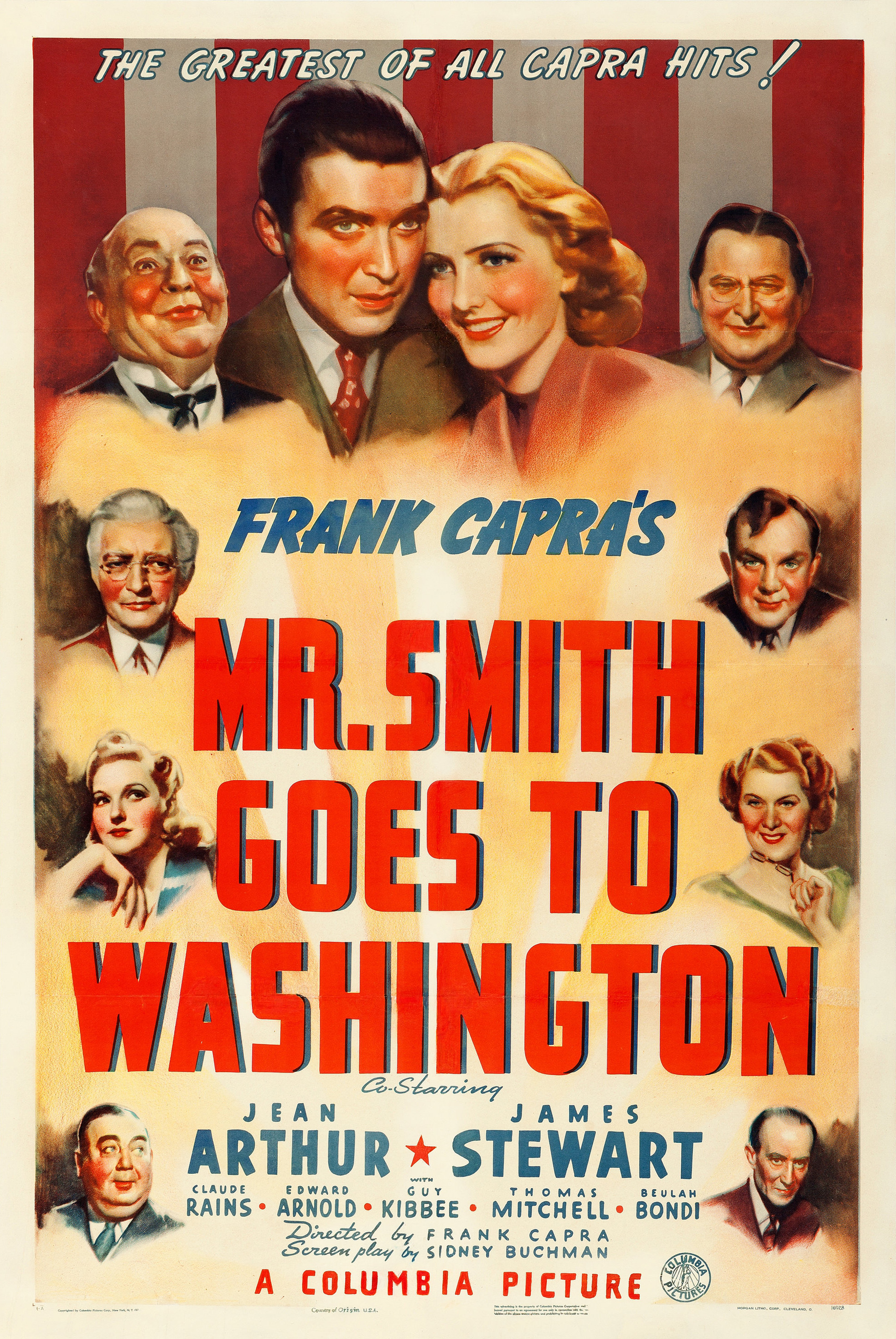
Mr. Smith Goes to Washington (1939)

Although It's a Wonderful Life is his best-known film, Friedman notes that it was Mr. Smith Goes to Washington (1939), which most represented the "Capra myth". That film expressed Capra's patriotism more than any others, and "presented the individual working within the democratic system to overcome rampant political corruption".

The film, however, became Capra's most controversial. In his research before filming, he was able to stand close to President Franklin D. Roosevelt during a press conference after the recent acts of war by Germany in Europe. Capra recalls his fears:

And panic hit me. Japan was slicing up the colossus of China piece by piece. Nazi Panzers had rolled into Austria and Czechoslovakia; their thunder echoed over Europe. England and France shuddered. The Russian bear growled ominously in the Kremlin. The black cloud of war hung over the chancelleries of the world. Official Washington from the President down, was in the process of making hard, torturing decisions. "And here was I, in the process of making a satire about government officials; ... Wasn't this the most untimely time for me to make a film about Washington?

When the filming was completed, the studio sent preview copies to Washington. Joseph P. Kennedy Sr., U.S. ambassador to the UK, wrote to Columbia head Harry Cohn, "Please do not play this picture in Europe." Politicians were concerned about the potential negative effect the film might have on the morale of the United States' allies, as World War II had begun. Kennedy wrote to President Roosevelt that, "In foreign countries this film must inevitably strengthen the mistaken impression that the United States is full of graft, corruption and lawlessness." Many studio heads agreed, nor did they want negative feelings about Hollywood instilled in political leaders.

Nonetheless, Capra's vision of the film's significance was clear:

The more uncertain are the people of the world, the more their hard-won freedoms are scattered and lost in the winds of chance, the more they need a ringing statement of America's democratic ideals. The soul of our film would be anchored in Lincoln. Our Jefferson Smith would be a young Abe Lincoln, tailored to the rail-splitter's simplicity, compassion, ideals, humor, and unswerving moral courage under pressure.

Capra pleaded with Cohn to allow the film to go into distribution and remembers the intensity of their decision making:

Harry Cohn paced the floor, as stunned as Abraham must have been when the Lord asked him to sacrifice his beloved son Isaac.

Cohn and Capra chose to ignore the negative publicity and demands and released the film as planned. It was later nominated for 11 Academy Awards, only winning one (for Best Original Story) partly because the number of major pictures that were nominated that year was 10, including The Wizard of Oz and Gone with the Wind. Hollywood columnist Louella Parsons called it a "smash patriotic hit" and most critics agreed, seeing that audiences left the theaters with "an enthusiasm for democracy" and "in a glow of patriotism."

The significance of the film's message was established further in France, shortly after World War II began. When the French public was asked to select which film they wanted to see most, having been told by the Vichy government that soon no more American films would be allowed in France, the overwhelming majority chose it over all others. To a France soon to be completely occupied by Nazi forces, the film most expressed the "perseverance of democracy and the American way."

=== Impasse ===
Capra became enchanted with a German-made film biography of composer Frédéric Chopin. He purchased the film himself as a basis for his new production, and recruited one of Columbia's leading writers, Sidney Buchman, to fashion a screenplay. Capra spent a full year working on the Chopin project, and the film was ready to go into production. Capra wanted to make the film in the costly Technicolor process—a first for Columbia—but Columbia's New York office balked at the expense. As Cohn's biographer Bob Thomas recounted, "They were aghast at the prospect of trying to sell an expensive costume film about a piano player and a woman novelist who wore pants and smoked cigars. The opposition was strong enough to veto the project." The enraged Capra quit Columbia. Harry Cohn tried to lure him back with an unprecedented profit-sharing split of 50/50, but Capra accepted a million-dollar cash offer from Warner Bros. Columbia ultimately went ahead with the Chopin biography, in Technicolor, under the direction of Charles Vidor: A Song to Remember (1945).

==== Meet John Doe (1941) ====
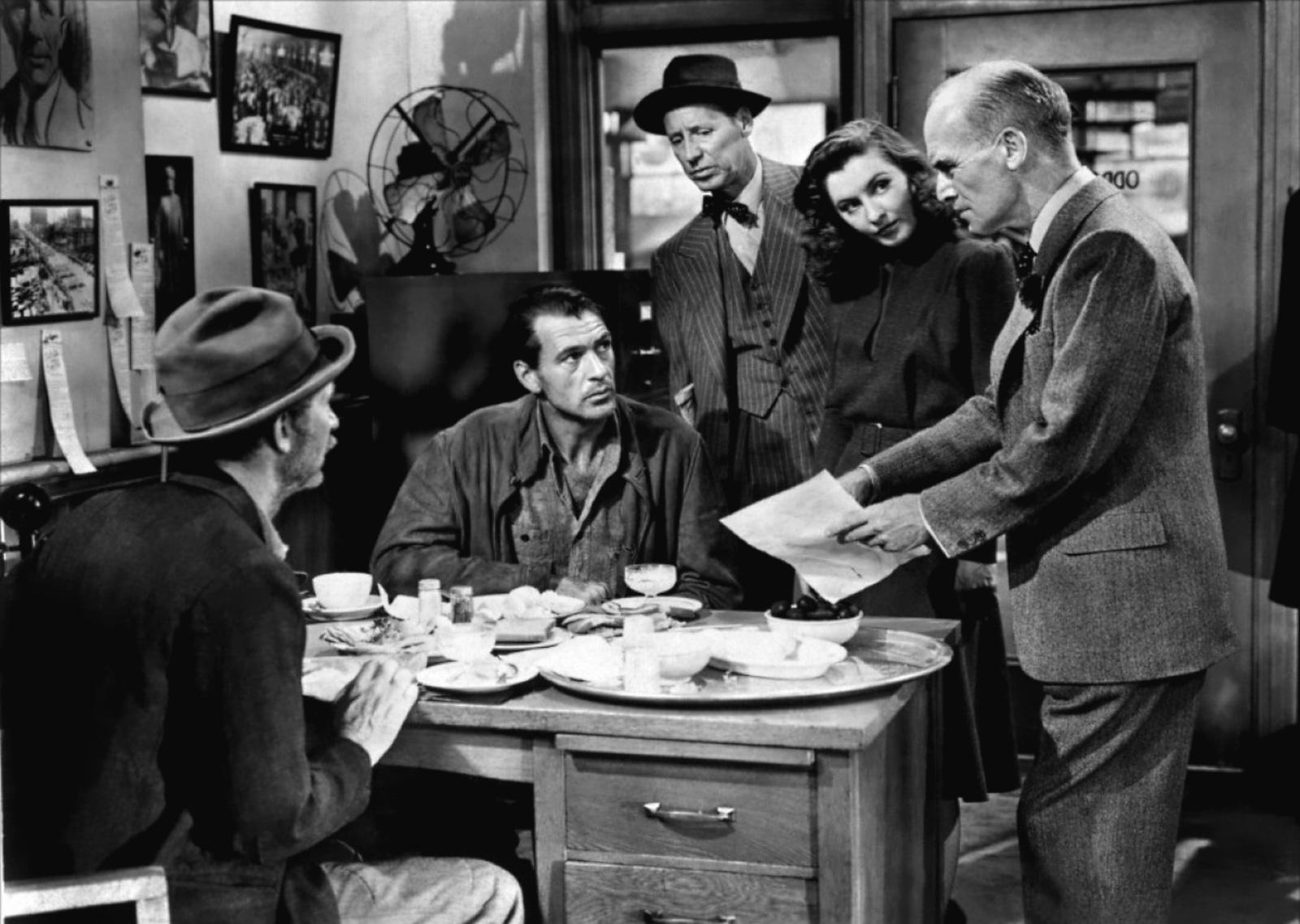
Walter Brennan, Gary Cooper, Irving Bacon, Barbara Stanwyck, and James Gleason in Meet John Doe

Capra's first Warner project was Meet John Doe (1941). So important was the Capra name that Warner Bros. took its own name off the main title. Instead of the usual "Warner Bros. Pictures presents", Meet John Doe begins with "Presenting".

Some consider Meet John Doe to be Capra's most controversial movie. The film's hero, played by Gary Cooper, is a former baseball player now bumming around, lacking goals. He is selected by a news reporter to represent the "common man," to capture the imagination of ordinary Americans. The film was released shortly before America became involved in World War II, and citizens were still in an isolationist mood. According to some historians, the film was made to convey a "deliberate reaffirmation of American values," though ones that seemed uncertain with respect to the future.

Film author Richard Glazer speculates that the film was autobiographical, "reflecting Capra's own uncertainties". Glazer describes how, "John's accidental transformation from drifter to national figure parallels Capra's own early drifting experience and subsequent involvement in movie making ... Meet John Doe, then, was an attempt to work out his own fears and questions."

== World War II years (1941–1945) ==
=== Joining the Army after Pearl Harbor ===
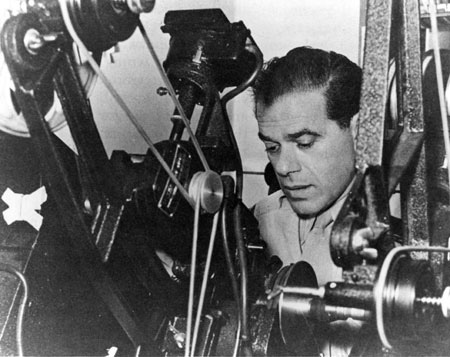
Capra editing film as a major during World War II

Within four days of the Japanese Attack on Pearl Harbor on December 7, 1941, Capra quit his successful directing career in Hollywood and received a commission as a major in the United States Army. He also gave up his presidency of the Screen Directors Guild. Being 44 years of age, he was not asked to enlist, but, notes Friedman, "Capra had an intense desire to prove his patriotism to his adopted land."

Capra recalls some personal reasons for enlisting:

I had a guilty conscience. In my films I championed the cause of the gentle, the poor, the downtrodden. Yet I had begun to live like the Aga Khan. The curse of Hollywood is big money. It comes so fast it breeds and imposes its own mores, not of wealth, but of ostentation and phony status.

=== Why We Fight series ===
During the next four years of World War II, Capra's job was to head a special section on morale to explain to soldiers "why the hell they're in uniform", writes Capra, and were not "propaganda" films like those created by the Nazis and Japan. Capra directed or co-directed seven documentary war information films.

Capra was assigned to work directly under Chief of Staff George C. Marshall, the most senior officer in command of the Army, who later created the Marshall Plan and was awarded a Nobel Peace Prize. Marshall chose to bypass the usual documentary film-making department, Signal Corps, because he felt they were not capable of producing "sensitive and objective troop information films". One colonel explained the importance of these future films to Capra:

You were the answer to the General's prayer ... You see, Frank, this idea about films to explain "why" the boys are in uniform is General Marshall's own baby, and he wants the nursery right next to his Chief of Staff's office.

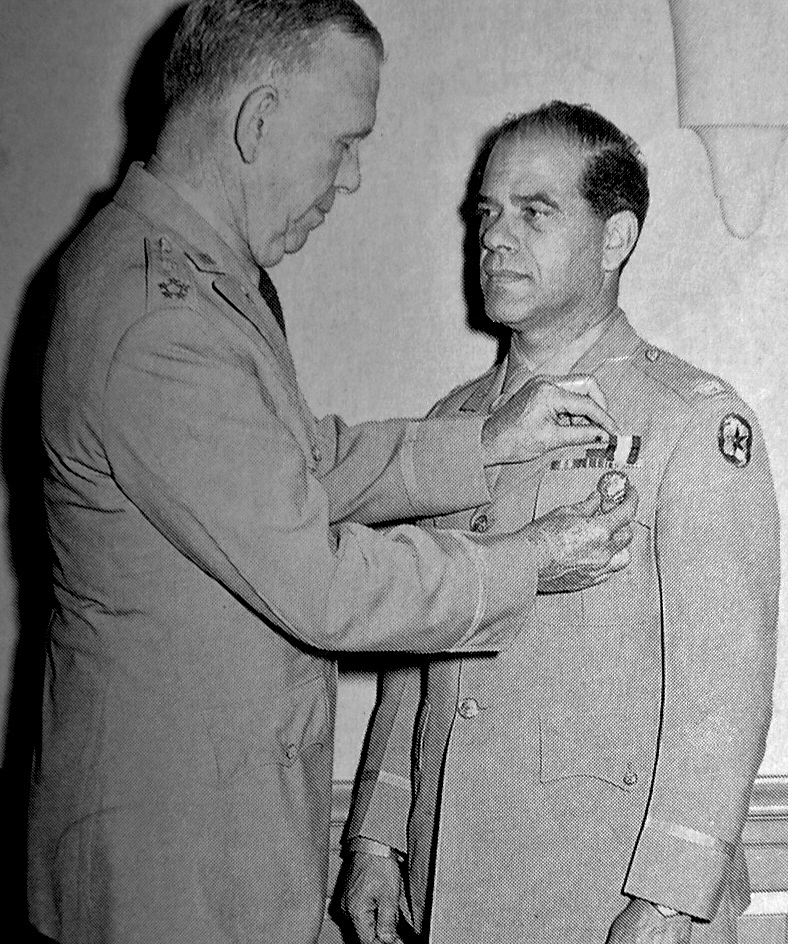
Capra receiving the Distinguished Service Medal from General George C. Marshall, 1945

During his first meeting with General Marshall, Capra was told his mission:

Now, Capra, I want to nail down with you a plan to make a series of documented, factual-information films—the first in our history—that will explain to our boys in the Army why we are fighting, and the principles for which we are fighting ... You have an opportunity to contribute enormously to your country and the cause of freedom. Are you aware of that, sir?

Capra ended up directing a seven-episode Why We Fight series: Prelude to War (1942), The Nazis Strike (1942), Divide and Conquer (1943), The Battle of Britain (1943), The Battle of Russia (1943), The Battle of China (1944), and War Comes to America (1945). Additionally, Capra directed or co-directed the propaganda films Tunisian Victory (1945) Know Your Enemy: Japan (1945), Here Is Germany (1945), and Two Down and One to Go (1945), which do not bear the Why We Fight banner. Capra also produced the critically acclaimed The Negro Soldier (1944), which was directed by Stuart Heisler. Capra also directed, uncredited, the 13-minute film Your Job in Germany (1945), which was meant for US troops headed to Allied-occupied Germany.

After he completed the first few documentaries, government officials and U.S. Army staff felt they were powerful messages and excellent presentations of why it was necessary for the United States to fight in the war. All footage came from military and government sources, whereas during earlier years, many newsreels secretly used footage from enemy sources. Animated charts were created by Walt Disney and his animators. A number of Hollywood composers wrote the background music, including Alfred Newman and Russian-born composer Dimitri Tiomkin. After the first complete film was viewed by General Marshall along with U.S. Army staff—and Franklin Roosevelt—Marshall approached Capra: "Colonel Capra, how did you do it? That is a most wonderful thing."

FDR was effusive: "I want every American to see this motion picture. General—please make all necessary arrangements." Prelude To War was distributed by 20th Century-Fox, and was nationally acclaimed. Fox also released Capra's Why We Fight opus, The Battle Of Russia. Released to service audiences in two-parts to accommodate hour-long periods during induction training, the nine-reel (nearly 90 minutes) epic detailed Russian history using excerpts of the films of Sergei Eisenstein, then proceeded to recent history through captured Nazi newsreels and those supplied reluctantly by Stalin. When he was shown the film in Moscow, Stalin was effusive and ordered one thousand 35mm prints. He was so anxious that his people should see the film that he did not bother creating a Russian soundtrack. Capra laughed in amazement years later when re-counting the tale: "Stalin had interpreters at the side of the stage in all the theatres. They simply translated the film on the fly, yelling like hell to be heard over the music and sound effects". The series was seen in theaters throughout the U.S. They were also translated into French, Spanish, Portuguese, and Chinese for screening in other countries, under the aegis of Robert Riskin. Winston Churchill ordered that all of them be shown to the British public in theaters.

Following a shifting of alliances at the end of World War II, some of the Why We Fight films were effectively banned. The Battle Of Russia, due to its positivity toward the Soviet Union, was essentially banned until the 1980s. Conversely, some of the other films, which spoke negatively of the Germans and Japanese, were taken out of print, as these countries were now allies. Know Your Enemy: Japan, which barely saw a release because its release date came just days before the Japanese surrender, was kept under wraps afterwards as well: Capra noted that the U.S. "suddenly needed friendly relations with the Japs and the film, along with several others, was locked up".

The Why We Fight series is widely considered a masterpiece of war information documentaries. Prelude to War, the first in the series, won the 1942 Academy Award for Best Documentary Feature. "Divide and Conquer," about the German victory in the Low Countries and France in 1940, is an excellent treatment of that decisive campaign, particularly the fall of France. When his career ended years later, Capra regarded these films as his most important works. He was discharged from the service in 1945 as a colonel.

== Post-war career (1946–1961) ==
=== Liberty Films ===
Trailer for It's a Wonderful Life (1946)

After the war ended, Capra and directors William Wyler and George Stevens founded Liberty Films, which became the first independent company of directors since United Artists in 1919 whose goal was to make films without interference by studio bosses.

However, the only pictures completed by the studio were It's a Wonderful Life (1946) and State of the Union (1948). While its copyright status remains in flux, the first was a box office disappointment but was nominated for five Academy Awards.

For State of the Union (1948), Capra changed studios: it was the only time he ever worked for MGM. Although the project had an excellent cast, led by stars Spencer Tracy and Katharine Hepburn, the film was not a success, and Capra's statement, "I think State of the Union was my most perfect film in handling people and ideas" has few adherents today.

==== It's a Wonderful Life (1946) ====
In 1998, the American Film Institute (AFI) named it one of the best films ever made, putting it at 11th on AFI's 100 Years...100 Movies list of the top American films of all time. In 2006, the AFI put the film at the top of its AFI's 100 Years...100 Cheers list, ranking what AFI considers the most inspirational American movies of all time.

It became Capra's last film to win major acclaim—his successful years were now behind him, although he directed five more films over the next 14 years.

=== Representing U.S. at International Film Festival ===
In January 1952, the U.S. Ambassador to India asked Capra to represent the U.S. film industry at an International Film Festival to be held in India. A State Department friend of Capra asked him and explained why his trip would be important:

[Ambassador] Bowles thinks the Festival is a Communist shenanigan of some kind, but he doesn't know what ... Bowles has asked for you. "I want a free-wheeling guy to take care of our interest on his own. I want Capra. His name is big here, and I've heard he's quick on his feet in an alley fight.

After two weeks in India, Capra discovered that Bowles' fears were warranted, as many film sessions were used by Russian and Chinese representatives to give long political speeches. At a lunch with 15 Indian directors and producers, he stressed that "they must preserve freedom as artists, and that any government control would hinder that freedom. A totalitarian system—and they would become nothing but publicity men for the party in power." Capra had a difficult time communicating this, however, as he noted in his diary:

They all think some super-government or super-collection of individuals dictates all American pictures. Free enterprise is mystery to them. Somebody must control, either visible or invisible ... Even intellectuals have no great understanding of liberty and freedom ... Democracy is only a theory to them. They have no idea of service to others, of service to the poor. The poor are despised, in a sense.

When he returned to Washington to give his report, Secretary of State Dean Acheson gave Capra his commendation for "virtually single-handedly forestalling a possible Communist take-over of Indian films". Ambassador Bowles also conveyed gratitude to Capra for "one helluva job".

=== Disillusionment period and later years ===
Following It's a Wonderful Life and State of the Union, which were done soon after the war ended, Capra's themes were becoming out of step with changes in the film industry and the public mood. Friedman finds that while Capra's ideas were popular with depression-era and prewar audiences, they became less relevant to a prospering postwar America. Capra didn't help his own cause when he consulted old 1930s scripts for his latest productions. Capra had become "disconnected from an American culture that had changed" during the previous decade. Biographer Joseph McBride argues that Capra's disillusionment was more related to the negative effect that the House Un-American Activities Committee (HUAC) had on the film industry in general. The HUAC interrogations in the early 1950s ended many Hollywood careers. Capra himself was not called to testify, although he was a prime target of the committee due to his past associations with many Hollywood blacklisted screenwriters. To clear himself of accusations of disloyalty, Capra named some of his past collaborators as suspected communist sympathizers to both the Army-Navy-Air Force Personnel Security Board and to the FBI. "Frank Capra (1897–1991)". sagepub.com. Sage Publishing.

Capra blamed his early retirement from films on the rising power of stars, which forced him to continually compromise his artistic vision. He also claimed that increasing budgetary and scheduling demands had constrained his creative abilities. Film historian Michael Medved agreed with Capra, noting that he walked away from the movie business because "he refused to adjust to the cynicism of the new order." In his autobiography, written in 1971, Capra expressed his feelings about the shifting film industry:

The winds of change blew through the dream factories of make-believe, tore at its crinoline tatters ... The hedonists, the homosexuals, the hemophiliac bleeding hearts, the God-haters, the quick-buck artists who substituted shock for talent, all cried: "Shake 'em! Rattle 'em! God is dead. Long live pleasure! Nudity? Yea! Wife-swapping? Yea! Liberate the world from prudery. Emancipate our films from morality!" ... Kill for thrill—shock! Shock! To hell with the good in man, Dredge up his evil—shock! Shock!

Capra added that in his opinion, "practically all the Hollywood film-making of today is stooping to cheap salacious pornography in a crazy bastardization of a great art to compete for the 'patronage' of deviates and masturbators." (Note: Medved 1992 points out the irony in Capra's expression of disillusionment: Capra's film It Happened One Night (1934) was the first film to win all five top Oscars, and in 1991, a few months after Capra's death, The Silence of the Lambs also won all five top Oscars.)

Capra remained employable in Hollywood during and after the HUAC hearings but chose nonetheless to demonstrate his loyalty by attempting to re-enlist in the Army at the outbreak of the Korean War, in 1950. He was rejected due to his age. He was later invited to join the Defense Department's newly formed Think Tank project, VISTA, but was denied the necessary clearance. According to Friedman, "these two rejections were devastating to the man who had made a career of demonstrating American ideals in film", along with his directing award-winning documentary films for the Army.

=== Later films (1950–1961) ===
Capra directed two films at Paramount Pictures starring Bing Crosby, Riding High (1950, a remake of 1934's Broadway Bill) and Here Comes the Groom (1951). By 1952, at the age of 55, Capra effectively retired from Hollywood filmmaking; he shifted to working with the California Institute of Technology, his alma mater, to produce educational films on science topics.

From 1952 to 1956, Capra produced four science-related television specials in color for The Bell System Science Series: Our Mr. Sun (1956), Hemo the Magnificent (1957), The Strange Case of the Cosmic Rays (1957), and Meteora: The Unchained Goddess (1958). These educational science documentaries were popular favorites for school science classrooms for around 30 years. It was eight years before he directed another theatrical film, A Hole in the Head (1959) with Frank Sinatra and Edward G. Robinson, his first feature film in color.

His final theatrical film was with Glenn Ford and Bette Davis, named Pocketful of Miracles (1961), a remake of his 1933 film Lady for a Day. In the mid-1960s he worked on pre-production for an adaptation of Martin Caidin's novel Marooned, but he felt he could not make the movie on the $3 million budget he was given, and abandoned the project. (A film adaptation was finally made in 1969, directed by John Sturges with an $8 million budget.)

Capra's final film, Rendezvous in Space (1964), was an industrial film made for the Martin Marietta Company and shown at the 1964 New York World's Fair. It was exhibited at the New York Hall of Science after the Fair ended.

== Directing style ==
Capra's directing style relied on improvisation to a great extent. He was noted for going on the set with no more than the master scenes written. He explained his reasoning:

What you need is what the scene is about, who does what to whom, and who cares about whom ... All I want is a master scene and I'll take care of the rest—how to shoot it, how to keep the machinery out of the way, and how to focus attention on the actors at all times.

According to some experts, Capra used great, unobtrusive craftsmanship when directing, and felt it was bad directing to distract the audience with fancy technical gimmicks. Film historian and author William S. Pechter described Capra's style as one "of almost classical purity". He adds that his style relied on editing to help his films sustain a "sequence of rhythmic motion". Pechter describes its effect:

Capra's [editing] has the effect of imposing order on images constantly in motion, imposing order on chaos. The end of all this is indeed a kind of beauty, a beauty of controlled motion, more like dancing than painting ... His films move at a breathtaking clip: dynamic, driving, taut, at their extreme even hysterical; the unrelenting, frantic acceleration of pace seems to spring from the release of some tremendous accumulation of pressure.

Film critic John Raeburn discusses an early Capra film, American Madness (1932), as an example of how he had mastered the movie medium and expressed a unique style:

The tempo of the film, for example, is perfectly synchronized with the action ... as the intensity of the panic increases, Capra reduces the duration of each shot and uses more and more crosscutting and jump shots to emphasize the "madness" of what is happening ... Capra added to the naturalistic quality of the dialogue by having speakers overlap one another, as they often do in ordinary life; this was an innovation that helped to move the talkies away from the example of the legitimate stage.

As for Capra's subject matter, film author Richard Griffith tries to summarize Capra's common theme:

[A] messianic innocent ... pits himself against the forces of entrenched greed. His inexperience defeats him strategically, but his gallant integrity in the face of temptation calls for the goodwill of the "little people", and through their combined protest, he triumphs.

Capra's personality when directing gave him a reputation for "fierce independence" when dealing with studio bosses. On the set he was said to be gentle and considerate, "a director who displays absolutely no exhibitionism." As Capra's films often carry a message about basic goodness in human nature, and show the value of unselfishness and hard work, his wholesome, feel-good themes have led some cynics to term his style "Capra-corn". However, those who hold his vision in higher regard prefer the term "Capraesque".

Capra's basic themes of championing the common man, as well as his use of spontaneous, fast-paced dialogue and goofy, memorable lead and supporting characters, made him one of the most popular and respected filmmakers of the 20th century. His influence can be traced in the works of many directors, including Robert Altman, Ron Howard, Masaki Kobayashi, Akira Kurosawa, John Lasseter, David Lynch, John Milius, Martin Scorsese, Steven Spielberg, Oliver Stone and François Truffaut.

== Personal life ==
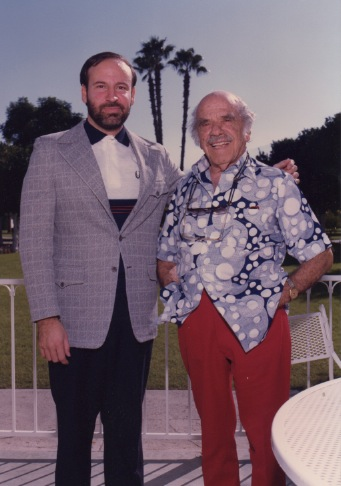
Capra (right), Alan Greenberg (left) in La Quinta, California, c. 1970s–1980s

=== Family ===
Capra married actress Helen Howell in 1923. The two divorced in 1928. He married Lucille Warner in 1932, with whom he had a daughter and three sons, one of whom, Johnny, died at age 3 following a tonsillectomy.

Capra was four times president of the Academy of Motion Picture Arts and Sciences and three times president of the Directors Guild of America, which he helped found. Under his presidency, he worked to give directors more artistic control of their films. During his career as a director, he retained an early ambition to teach science, and after his career declined in the 1950s, he made educational television films related to science subjects.

Physically, Capra was short, stocky, and vigorous, and enjoyed outdoor activities, such as hunting, fishing, and mountain climbing. In his later years, he spent time writing short stories and songs, along with playing guitar. He collected fine and rare books during the 1930s and 1940s. Six hundred forty items from his "distinguished library" were sold by Parke-Bernet Galleries at auction in New York in April 1949, realizing $68,000 ($920,100 today).

His son, Frank Capra Jr., was the president of EUE Screen Gems Studios in Wilmington, North Carolina, until his death on December 19, 2007. His grandsons, brothers Frank Capra III and Jonathan Capra, have both worked as assistant directors; Frank III worked on the 1995 film The American President, which referred to Frank Capra in the film's dialogue. Another son, Tom, was producer of the Today Show.

=== Political views ===
Capra's political views coalesced in some of his movies, which promoted and celebrated the spirit of American individualism. A conservative Republican, Capra strongly criticized Franklin D. Roosevelt during his tenure as governor of New York and opposed his presidency during the years of the Depression. Capra stood against government intervention during the national economic crisis. Nevertheless, the Los Angeles FBI chapter in May 1947 regarded Capra's film It's a Wonderful Life as glorifying "values or institutions judged to be particularly anti-American or pro-Communist." Despite Capra personally being a conservative Republican, Robert Riskin, who was Capra's frequent screenplay writer and vital to the plots of many of his films, was a New Deal Democrat.

In his later years, Capra became a self-described pacifist and was very critical of the Vietnam War.

=== Religious beliefs ===
Capra wrote in his early adulthood that he was a "Christmas Catholic". In his later years, Capra returned to the Catholic Church and described himself as "a Catholic in spirit; one who firmly believes that the anti-moral, the intellectual bigots, and the Mafias of ill will may destroy religion, but they will never conquer the cross".

== Death ==
In 1985, aged 88, Capra suffered the first of a series of strokes. On September 3, 1991, he died of a heart attack in his sleep at his home in La Quinta, California, at the age of 94. He was interred at Coachella Valley Public Cemetery in Coachella, California.

Capra left part of his 1,100 acre ranch in Fallbrook, California, to the California Institute of Technology, to be used as a retreat center. Capra's personal papers and some film-related materials are contained in the Wesleyan University Cinema Archives, which allows scholars and media experts full access.

== Legacy ==
During the golden age of Hollywood, Capra's "fantasies of goodwill" made him one of the two or three most famous and successful directors in the world. Film historian Ian Freer notes that at the time of his death in 1991, his legacy remained intact:

He had created feelgood entertainments before the phrase was invented, and his influence on culture—from Steven Spielberg to David Lynch, and from television soap operas to greeting-card sentiments—is simply too huge to calculate.

Director/actor John Cassavetes contemplating Capra's contribution to film quipped: "Maybe there really wasn't an America, it was only Frank Capra." Capra's films were his love letters to an idealized America—a cinematic landscape of his own invention. The performances his actors gave were invariable portrayals of personalities developed into recognizable images of popular culture, "their acting has the bold simplicity of an icon ..."

Like his contemporary, director John Ford, Capra defined and aggrandized the tropes of mythic America where individual courage invariably triumphs over collective evil. Film historian Richard Griffith speaks of Capra's "... reliance on sentimental conversation and the ultimate benevolence of ordinary America to resolve all deep conflicts." "Average America" is visualized as "... a tree-lined street, undistinguished frame houses surrounded by modest areas of grass, a few automobiles. For certain purposes, it assumed that all real Americans live in towns like this, and so great is the power of myth, even the born city-dweller is likely to believe vaguely that he too lives on this shady street, or comes from it, or is going to."

NYU professor Leonard Quart writes:

There would be no enduring conflicts—harmony, no matter how contrived and specious, would ultimately triumph in the last frame ... In true Hollywood fashion, no Capra film would ever suggest that social change was a complex, painful act. For Capra, there would be pain and loss, but no enduring sense of tragedy would be allowed to intrude on his fabulist world.

Although Capra's stature as a director had declined in the 1950s, his films underwent a revival in the 1960s:

Ten years later, it was clear that this trend had reversed itself. Post-auteurist critics once more acclaimed Capra as a cinematic master, and perhaps more surprisingly, young people packed Capra festivals and revivals all over the United States.

French film historian John Raeburn, editor of Cahiers du cinéma, noted that Capra's films were unknown in France, but there too his films underwent a fresh discovery by the public. He believes the reason for his renewed popularity had to do with his themes, which he made credible "an ideal conception of an American national character":

There is a strong libertarian streak in Capra's films, a distrust of power wherever it occurs and in whomever it is invested. Young people are won over by the fact that his heroes are uninterested in wealth and are characterized by vigorous ... individualism, a zest for experience, and a keen sense of political and social justice. ... Capra's heroes, in short, are ideal types, created in the image of a powerful national myth.

In 1982, the American Film Institute honored Capra by giving him their AFI Life Achievement Award. The event was used to create the television film, The American Film Institute Salute to Frank Capra, hosted by James Stewart. In 1986, Capra received the National Medal of Arts. During his acceptance speech for the AFI award, Capra stressed his most important values:

The art of Frank Capra is very, very simple: It's the love of people. Add two simple ideals to this love of people: the freedom of each individual, and the equal importance of each individual, and you have the principle upon which I based all my films.

Capra expanded on his visions in his 1971 autobiography, The Name Above the Title:

Forgotten among the hue-and criers were the hard-working stiffs that came home too tired to shout or demonstrate in streets ... and prayed they'd have enough left over to keep their kids in college, despite their knowing that some were pot-smoking, parasitic parent-haters.

Who would make films about, and for, these uncomplaining, unsqueaky wheels that greased the squeaky? Not me. My "one man, one film" Hollywood had ceased to exist. Actors had sliced it up into capital gains. And yet—mankind needed dramatizations of the truth that man is essentially good, a living atom of divinity; that compassion for others, friend or foe, is the noblest of all virtues. Films must be made to say these things, to counteract the violence and the meanness, to buy time to demobilize the hatreds.

Sam Wasson published a biography in 2026, Frank Capra: A Life.

== Awards and honors ==
The Why We Fight series earned Capra the Legion of Merit in 1943 and the Distinguished Service Medal in 1945.

In 1957, Capra was awarded the George Eastman Award, given by George Eastman House for distinguished contribution to the art of film.

Los Angeles Mayor Sam Yorty, by a vote of the city council, declared May 12, 1962 as "Frank Capra Day". George Sidney, President of the Directors Guild stated that "This is the first time in the history of Hollywood, that the city of Los Angeles has officially recognized a creative talent." At the event ceremony, director John Ford announced that Capra had also received an honorary Order of the British Empire (OBE) on the recommendation of Winston Churchill. Ford suggested publicly to Capra:

Make those human comedy-dramas, the kind only you can make—the kind of films America is proud to show here, behind the Iron Curtain, the Bamboo Curtain—and behind the lace curtain.

In 1966, Capra was awarded the Distinguished Alumni Award from his alma mater Caltech. (see section "Early Life", supra)

In 1972, Capra received the Golden Plate Award of the American Academy of Achievement.

In 1974, Capra was awarded the Inkpot Award.

In 1975, Capra was awarded the Golden Anchor Award by the U.S. Naval Reserve's Combat Camera Group for his contribution to World War II Naval photography and production of the "Why We Fight" series. The award ceremony included a video salute by President Ford. Attending were many of Capra's favorite actors including Jimmy Stewart, Donna Reed, Pat O'Brien, Jean Arthur, and others.

An annual It's a Wonderful Life celebration that Capra attended in 1981, during which he said, "This is one of the proudest moments of my life," was recounted in The New Yorker.

In the Academy Awards he was nominated six times for Best Director and seven times for Outstanding Production/Best Picture. Out of six nominations for Best Director, Capra received the award three times. He briefly held the record for winning the most Best Director Oscars when he won for the third time in 1938, until this record was matched by John Ford in 1941, and then later surpassed by Ford in 1952. William Wyler also matched this record upon winning his third Oscar in 1959.

The Academy Film Archive has preserved two of Capra's films, The Matinee Idol (1928) and Two Down and One to Go (1945).

=== Academy Awards ===
| Year | Film | Category | Result |
|---|---|---|---|
| 1934 | Lady for a Day | Best Director | Nominated |
| 1935 | It Happened One Night | Best Director | Won |
| 1936 | Mr. Deeds Goes to Town | Best Director | Won |
| 1938 | You Can't Take It with You | Best Director | Won |
| 1939 | Mr. Smith Goes to Washington | Best Director | Nominated |
| 1943 | Prelude to War | Best Documentary | Won |
| 1944 | The Battle of Russia | Best Documentary Feature | Nominated |
| 1946 | It's a Wonderful Life | Best Director | Nominated |

=== Other awards ===
American Film Institute

- Life Achievement Award (1982)

Directors Guild of America

- Best Director Nomination for A Hole in the Head (1959)
- Life Achievement Award (1959)
- Best Director Nomination for Pocketful of Miracles (1961)

Golden Globe Award

- Best Director Award for It's a Wonderful Life (1946)

Venice Film Festival

- Mussolini Cups for best foreign film Nomination for It Happened One Night (1934)
- Mussolini Cups for best foreign film Nomination for Mr. Deeds Goes to Town (1936)
- Golden Lion for Lifetime Achievement (1982)

American Film Institute recognition

- AFI's 100 Years...100 Movies (10th Anniversary Edition)
  - It's a Wonderful Life ... #20
  - Mr. Smith Goes to Washington ... #26
  - It Happened One Night ... #46
- AFI's 100 Years...100 Cheers
  - It's a Wonderful Life ... #1
  - Mr. Smith Goes to Washington ... #5
  - Meet John Doe ... #49
  - Mr. Deeds Goes to Town ... #83
- AFI's 100 Years...100 Laughs
  - It Happened One Night ... #8
  - Arsenic and Old Lace ... #30
  - Mr. Deeds Goes to Town ... #70
- AFI's 100 Years...100 Passions
  - It's a Wonderful Life ... #8
  - It Happened One Night ... #38
- AFI's 100 Years...100 Heroes & Villains
  - 50 greatest movie heroes
  - It's a Wonderful Life ... George Bailey ... #9
  - Mr. Smith Goes to Washington ... Jefferson Smith ... #11
  - 50 greatest movie villains
  - It's a Wonderful Life ... Mr. Potter ... #6
- AFI's 10 Top 10
  - Fantasy
    - It's a Wonderful Life ... #3
  - Romantic Comedies
    - It Happened One Night ... #3

United States National Film Registry

- The Strong Man (1926)
- The Power of the Press (1928)
- It Happened One Night (1934)
- Lost Horizon (1937)
- Mr. Smith Goes to Washington (1939)
- Why We Fight series of seven films (1942–1945)
- It's a Wonderful Life (1946)

== Notes ==
=== Sources ===
- Barney, Richard A (2009). David Lynch: Interviews. Conversations with Filmmakers. Jackson, Mississippi: University Press of Mississippi. ISBN 978-1-60473-237-5.
- Barson, Michael. The Illustrated Who's Who of Hollywood Directors: The Sound Era. New York: Noonday Press, 1995. ISBN 0-374-52428-9
- Beauchamp, Cari. Joseph P. Kennedy Presents: His Hollywood Years. New York: Vintage, 2010. ISBN 978-0-307-47522-0
- Brooks, Patricia and Johnathan. "Chapter 8: East L.A. and the Desert." Laid to Rest in California: A Guide to the Cemeteries and Grave Sites of the Rich and Famous. Guilford, Connecticut: Globe Pequot Press, 2006. ISBN 978-0-7627-4101-4
- Capra, Frank (1971). The Name Above the Title – An Autobiography. New York: The Macmillan Company. ISBN 0-306-80771-8. OCLC 679451848 – via Internet Archive.
- Carney, Raymond. American Vision: The Films of Frank Capra. Cambridge University Press, 1986. ISBN 0-521-32619-2
- Chandler, Charlotte. The Girl Who Walked Home Alone: Bette Davis, A Personal Biography. New York: Simon & Schuster, 2006. ISBN 0-7862-8639-3
- Dickstein, Morris. Dancing in The Dark: A Cultural History of The Great Depression. New York: W.W. Norton & Company, 2010. ISBN 978-0-393-07225-9
- Dixon, Wheeler W. The Early Film Criticism of Francois Truffaut. Bloomington, Indiana: Indiana University Press, 1993. ISBN 978-0-253-20771-5
- Freer, Ian. Movie Makers: 50 Iconic Directors from Chaplin to the Coen Brothers. London: Quercus Publishing Plc, 2009. ISBN 978-1-84724-512-0
- Kotsabilas-Davis, James and Myrna Loy. Being and Becoming. New York: Primus, Donald I Fine Inc., 1987. ISBN 1-55611-101-0
- Lazere, Donald. American Media and Mass Culture: Left Perspectives. Berkeley, California: University of California Press, 1987. ISBN 978-0-520-04496-8
- Medved, Michael (1992). Hollywood vs. America: Popular Culture and the War on Traditional Values. New York: HarperCollins. ISBN 978-0-06-016882-7.
- McBride, Joseph (1992). Frank Capra: The Catastrophe of Success. New York: Simon & Schuster. ISBN 9780671734947.
- Oderman, Stuart. Talking To the Piano Player: Silent Film Stars, Writers and Directors Remember. Albany, Georgia: BearManor Media, 2005. ISBN 1-59393-013-5
- Poague, Leland. Frank Capra: Interviews (Conversations With Filmmakers Series). Jackson, Mississippi: University Press of Mississippi, 2004. ISBN 978-1-57806-617-9
- Pendergast, Tom and Sara, eds. St. James Encyclopedia of Popular Culture, Vol. 1. Detroit: St. James Press, 2000. ISBN 1-55862-348-5
- Stevens, George Jr. Conversations with the Great Moviemakers of Hollywood's Golden Age. New York: Alfred A. Knopf, 2006. ISBN 978-1-4000-4054-4
- Sullivan, Daniel J. (2005). "Sentimental Hogwash? On Capra's It's a Wonderful Life" (PDF). Humanitas. XVIII (1–2): 115–140. doi:10.5840/humanitas2005181/26. S2CID 169579501. Archived (PDF) from the original on September 27, 2006.
- Wakeman, John, ed. World Film Directors: Volume One, 1890–1945. New York: H.W. Wilson Co., 1987. ISBN 978-0-8242-0757-1
- Wiley, Mason and Damien Bona. Inside Oscar: The Unofficial History of the Academy Awards. New York: Ballantine Books, 1987. ISBN 0-345-34453-7
- Wilson, Victoria. A Life of Barbara Stanwyck: Steel-True 1907–1940. New York: Simon & Schuster, 2013, ISBN 978-0-6848-3168-8

Non-profit organization positions
| Preceded by Frank Lloyd | President of the Academy of Motion Picture Arts and Sciences; 1935–1939 | Succeeded by Walter Wanger |
