= Eileen Maxson =

American interdisciplinary artist

- Born: 1980 (age 45–46); Rockville Centre, New York
- Education: Carnegie Mellon University, University of Houston, De Ateliers, Amsterdam
- Awards: Arthouse Texas Prize

Eileen Maxson (born 1980) is an American interdisciplinary artist working at the confluence of video, installation and performance. Her works focus on contemplating an identity mediated and perforated by a contemporary world. She is the first recipient of the Arthouse Texas Prize.

== Early life and education ==
Born in 1980 Rockville Centre, New York, Maxson "is an interdisciplinary artist working at the confluence of video, performance, installation, and photography," also received her MFA from Carnegie Mellon University in 2008, her BFA from the University of Houston in 2002 and attended the De Ateliers program in Amsterdam, Netherlands from 2008-2010.

== Career ==
Maxson's works have been seen at museums and microcinemas from Texas to Tel Aviv, including The Dallas Museum of Art, TX; Anthology Film Archives, NY; Art in General, NY; Los Angeles County Museum of Art, Los Angeles; Light Industry, Brooklyn; Museo Tamayo de Arte Contemporaneo, Mexico City; the New York Underground Film Festival; Portland Documentary and Experimental Film Festivals and on the Internet.

In 2008, Lost Broadcasts, a DVD compilation of Maxson’s videos, was released by the nationally recognized, Houston-based microcinema Aurora Picture Show in conjunction with Microcinema International.

In 2006, Maxson was called "...a transmedia Cindy Sherman for the MySpace generation..." by New York Village Voice media critic Ed Halter. Halter had previously named her to a "sweet 16" list of experimental film and video, 2003.

=== Texas Prize ===
In 2005, Maxson was named as a finalist for the inaugural Texas Prize, a $30,000 art prize established by the Austin, Texas, non-profit Arthouse and the largest art prize in the region at the time. Maxson was awarded the prize in a ceremony presided over by former Texas Governor Ann Richards.
