= Military–entertainment complex =

Cooperation between the military and entertainment industries

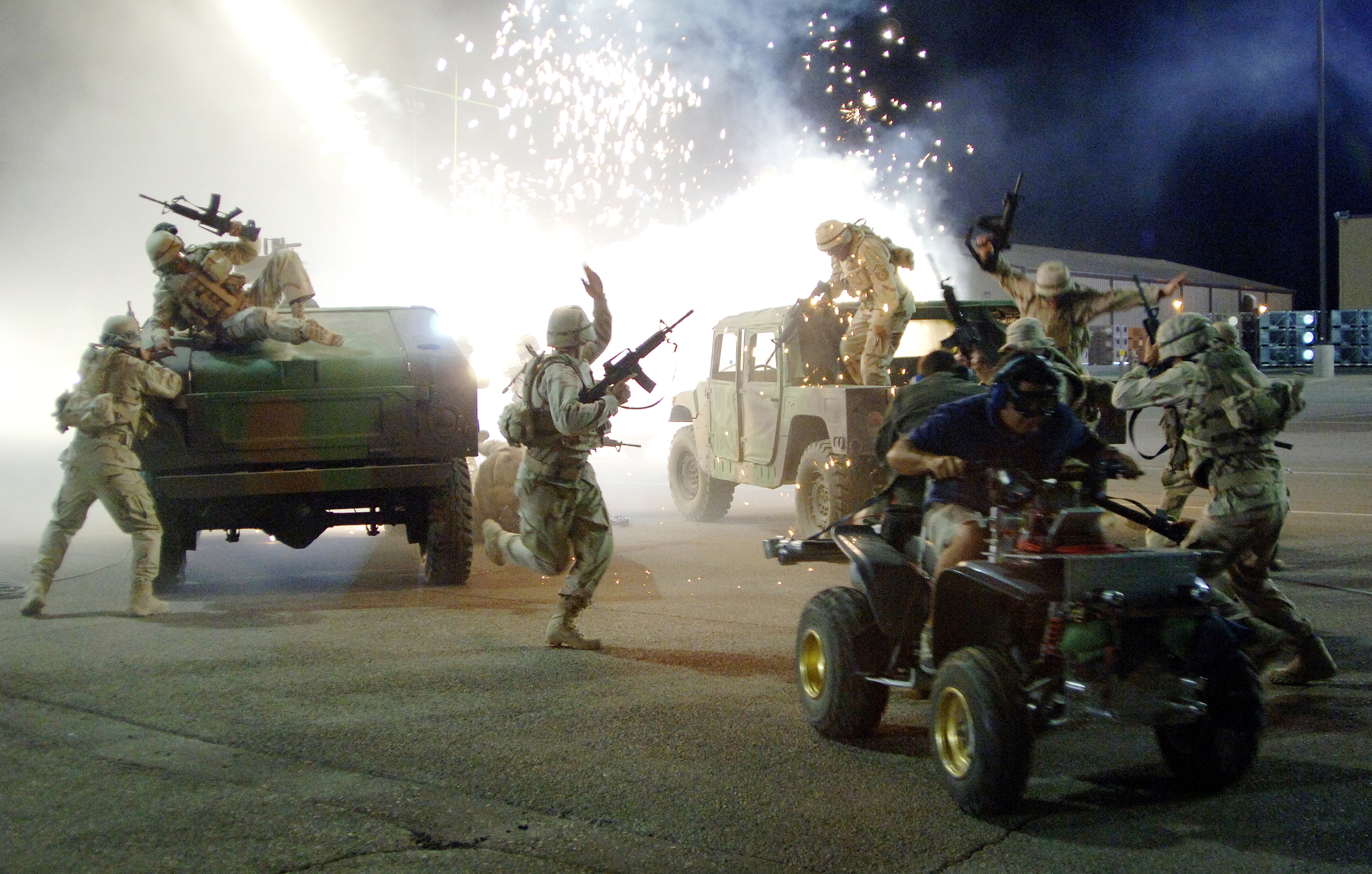
U.S. Air Force airmen acting as extras during the filming of the 2007 film Transformers at Holloman Air Force Base. A camera operator on an ATV can be seen filming them on the right.

The military–entertainment complex is the cooperation between militaries and entertainment industries to their mutual benefit, especially in such fields as cinema, multimedia, and virtual reality.

Though the term can be used to describe any military–entertainment complex in any nation, the most prominent complex is between the United States Department of Defense (DoD) and the film industry of the United States.

== History ==
During World War 2 the United States sought to use entertainment as a form of propaganda. In 1943 the Office of Strategic Services (a precursor to the CIA) circulated a memo stating the cinema is "one of the most powerful propaganda weapons at the disposal of the United States" and recommended "the voluntary cooperation of all motion agencies not under the control of the JCS [Joint Chiefs of Staff]".

The United States Office of War Information utilized cinema for its own ends to rally the public behind the war effort. Director Elmer Davis stated "The easiest way to inject a propaganda idea into most people's minds is to let it go in through the medium of an entertainment picture when they do not realize that they are being propagandized".

In 1953 US President Dwight D. Eisenhower declared "The hand of government must be carefully concealed, and, in some cases I should say, wholly eliminated" and that "a great deal of this particular type of thing would be done through arrangements with all sorts of privately operated enterprises in the field of entertainment, dramatics, music, and so on and so on."

Following the 9/11 attacks there was an increase in collaboration between the US government and Hollywood. In the weeks after the attack Karl Rove and a number of senior governmental officials travelled to Hollywood where they had a number of meetings with studio executives. The studios, including the President of the Motion Picture Association of America, pledged to aid the administration's efforts.

== Movies and television ==
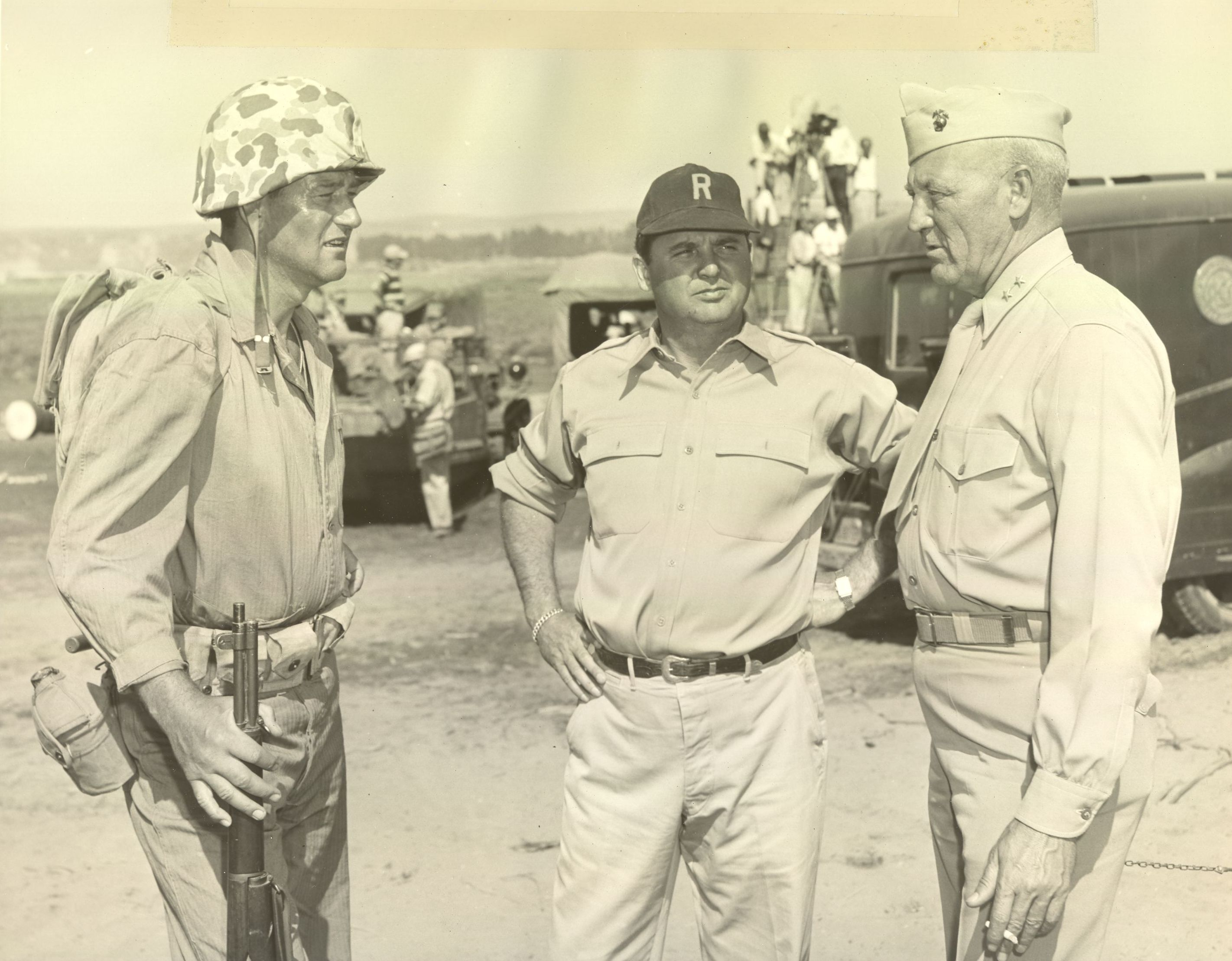
Major General Graves B. Erskine talks with John Wayne during the filming of Sands of Iwo Jima.

In Hollywood, many movie and television productions are, by choice, contractually supervised by the DoD Entertainment Media Unit within the Office of the Secretary of Defense at the Pentagon, and by the public affairs offices of the military services maintained solely for the American entertainment industry in Hollywood, Los Angeles. Producers looking to borrow military equipment or filming on location at a military installation for their works need to apply to the DoD, and submit their movies' scripts for vetting. Ultimately, the DoD has a say in every U.S.-made movie that uses DoD resources, not available on the open market, in their productions.

During World War II, Hollywood "became the unofficial propaganda arm of the U.S. military". The United States Office of War Information (OWI) had a unit exclusively dedicated to Hollywood called the Bureau of Motion Pictures. From 1942 to 1945, the OWI's Bureau of Motion Pictures reviewed 1,652 film scripts and revised or discarded any that portrayed the United States in a negative light, including material that made Americans seem "oblivious to the war or anti-war."

Four decades after the release of the 1954 adult animated film Animal Farm, Cold War historian Tony Shaw discovered, through looking at archives of the film, that the CIA had secretly purchased the rights to the film. The CIA also altered the ending of the film so that the pigs, who represent communists, were overthrown by the other animals on the farm.

The 1986 film Top Gun, produced by Don Simpson and Jerry Bruckheimer at Paramount Pictures, and with DoD assistance, aimed at rebranding the U.S. Navy's image in the post-Vietnam War era. During the showings of the film, military recruiters set up tables in cinemas during its premieres. However, claims enlistments spiked as high as 500% are a myth, and enlistments only rose by approximately 8% in 1986. By the end of the 1980s and early 1990s, Hollywood producers were stressing script writers to create military-related plots to gain production power from the U.S. military.

The 1996 film Independence Day originally had a DoD production assistance agreement, but had support cancelled after director Roland Emmerich refused a government request to remove all mentions of Area 51 from the film. Similarly, the DoD initially approved the use of installations and equipment for the 1984 film Red Dawn, but director John Milius decided it was too expensive and the film was made without cooperation with the department.

Some American movies made with script approval from the Department of Defense include:

- Above and Beyond (1952)
- Above the Clouds (1933)
- Ace of Aces (1933)
- Action in the North Atlantic (1943)
- Aerial Gunner (1943)
- Air Cadet (1951)
- Air Devils (1938)
- Airport 1975 (1974)
- Air Force (1943)
- Air Force One (1997)
- All Hands on Deck (1961)
- All the Young Men (1960)
- The American President (1995)
- Annapolis (2006)
- Annapolis Farewell (1935)
- Annapolis Salute (1937)
- An Annapolis Story (1955)
- Antwone Fisher (2002)
- Anzio (1968)
- Ambush Bay (1966)
- America (1924)
- Apollo 13 (1995)
- Armageddon (1998)
- Armored Command (1961)
- At War with the Army (1950)
- A Time to Kill (1996)
- Away All Boats (1956)
- Back to Bataan (1945)
- Bailout at 43,000 (1957)
- The Bamboo Prison (1954)
- Batman & Robin (1997)
- Battle at Bloody Beach (1961)
- Battle Circus (1953)
- Battle Cry (1955)
- Battleground (1949)
- Battleship (2012)
- Battle: Los Angeles (2011)
- Battle of the Coral Sea (1959)
- Battle Stations (1956)
- Battle Taxi (1955)
- Battle Zone (1952)
- Behind Enemy Lines (2001)
- Between Heaven and Hell (1956)
- The Big Lift (1950)
- The Big Parade (1925)
- Biloxi Blues (1988)
- The Birth of a Nation (1915)
- A Bridge Too Far (1977)
- Black Hawk Down (2001)
- Brother Rat (1938)
- Bombardier (1943)
- Bombers B-52 (1957)
- Breakthrough (1950)
- The Bridges at Toko-Ri (1954)
- The Caine Mutiny (1954)
- Captured (1933)
- Camp Nowhere (1994)
- Captain Marvel (2019)
- Captain Phillips (2013)
- Captain Newman, M.D. (1963)
- Classmates (1924)
- Clear and Present Danger (1994)
- The Cock-Eyed World (1929)
- Contact (1997)
- Convoy (1978)
- Combat Squad (1953)
- Command Decision (1948)
- The Core (2003)
- Crash Dive (1943)
- Cutaway (2000)
- Darby's Rangers (1958)
- The Day the Earth Stood Still (1951)
- Deep Impact (1998)
- The Deep Six (1958)
- Déjà Vu (2006)
- Destination Tokyo (1943)
- Decision Before Dawn (1951)
- Destroyer (1943)
- The Devil's Brigade (1968)
- Devil Dogs of the Air (1935)
- Devil's Playground (1937)
- The Day After Tomorrow (2006)
- The D.I. (1957)
- Dirigible (1931)
- Dive Bomber (1941)
- Don't Go Near the Water (1957)
- Don't Look Up (2021)
- Dress Parade (1927)
- Easy Come, Easy Go (1967)
- The Enemy Below (1957)
- The Eternal Sea (1955)
- Elio (film) (2025)
- Ernest Saves Christmas (1988)
- Executive Decision (1996)
- The Fighting Seabees (1944)
- Flags of Our Fathers (2006)
- Flat Top (1952)
- The Fleet's In (1942)
- First to Fight (1967)
- Flying Leathernecks (1951)
- Flirtation Walk (1934)
- Flight (1929)
- Flight Command (1940)
- Flight Nurse (1953)
- Fly Away Home (1996)
- The Flying Fleet (1929)
- The Flying Missile (1950)
- Flying Tigers (1942)
- Follow the Fleet (1936)
- Force of Arms (1951)
- Fighter Squadron (1948)
- Francis (1950)
- Francis Goes to West Point (1952)
- Francis in the Navy (1955)
- Francis Joins the WACS (1954)
- The Frogmen (1951)
- From Here to Eternity (1953)
- A Gathering of Eagles (1963)
- The Gallant Hours (1960)
- G.I. Blues (1960)
- G.I. Joe: The Rise of Cobra (2009)
- The Girl He Left Behind (1956)
- The Girls of Pleasure Island (1953)
- The Glenn Miller Story (1954)
- Guadalcanal Diary (1943)
- The Glory Brigade (1953)
- God Is My Co-Pilot (1945)
- Good Guys Wear Black (1978)
- Godzilla (1998)
  - Godzilla (2014)
- Gray Lady Down (1978)
- The Green Berets (1968)
- Guarding Tess (1994)
- Gung Ho! (1943)
- Go for Broke! (1951)
- Halls of Montezuma (1951)
- Hold Back the Night (1956)
- Hold 'Em Navy (1937)
- The Final Countdown (1980)
- Hamburger Hill (1987)
- Heaven Knows, Mr. Allison (1957)
- Hell Below (1933)
- Hell Divers (1932)
- Hell Is for Heroes (1962)
- Hell to Eternity (1960)
- Hellcats of the Navy (1957)
- The Hero of Submarine D-2 (1916)
- The Hanoi Hilton (1987)
- The Hunters (1958)
- I Am Legend (2007)
- I Aim at the Stars (1960)
- Ice Station Zebra (1968)
- Indiana Jones and the Last Crusade (1989)
- Invasion U.S.A. (1985)
- In the Army Now (1994)
- In Harm's Way (1965)
- Invaders from Mars (1953)
- Iron Man (2008)
  - Iron Man 2 (2010)
- The Jackal (1997)
- James Bond series:
  - Goldfinger (1964)
  - Thunderball (1965)
  - Licence to Kill (1989)
  - GoldenEye (1995)
  - Tomorrow Never Dies (1997)
- Jet Pilot (1957)
- John Paul Jones (1959)
- Jurassic Park III (2001)
- Jumping Jacks (1952)
- Judgment at Nuremberg (1961)
- The Karate Kid Part II (1986)
  - The Next Karate Kid (1994)
- King Kong (2005)
- Kings Go Forth (1958)
- MacArthur (1977)
- Mac and Me (1988)
- Man of Steel (film) (2013)
- Marine Raiders (1944)
- Major Movie Star (2008)
- The Men (1950)
- Men of the Fighting Lady (1954)
- Men Without Women (1930)
- Merrill's Marauders (1962)
- The McConnell Story (1955)
- Midway (2019)
- Mister Roberts (1955)
- The Midshipman (1925)
- Midshipman Jack (1933)
- Mission: Impossible – Dead Reckoning Part One (2023)
- Mission: Impossible – The Final Reckoning (2025)
- Navy Blue and Gold (1937)
- No Man Is an Island (1962)
- Planes (2013)
- Last Plane Out (1983)
- Larger than Life (1996)
- Last Action Hero (1993)
- The Long Gray Line (1955)
- The Longest Day (1962)
- Project Hail Mary (2026)
- Pet Sematary (1989)
- Purple Hearts (2022)
- Race to Space (2001)
- Random Hearts (1999)
- Red Dawn (2012)
- Renaissance Man (1994)
- The Right Stuff (1983)
- The Rocketeer (1991)
- Russkies (1987)
- The Silence of the Lambs (1991)
- Sphere (1998)
- The Sum of All Fears (2002)
- A Soldier's Story (1984)
- Star Trek IV: The Voyage Home (1986)
- Stripes (1981)
- Tank (1984)
- The Swarm (1978)
- Tears of the Sun (2003)
- The Bear (1984)
- The Client (1994)
- The Messenger (2009)
- The Perez Family (1995)
- The Perfect Storm (2000)
- The visiting (2007)
- Three Wishes (1995)
- Tugger: The Jeep 4x4 Who Wanted to Fly (2005)
- Tora! Tora! Tora! (1970)
- Top Gun (1986)
  - Top Gun: Maverick (2022)
- Transformers (2007)
  - Transformers: Revenge of the Fallen (2009)
  - Transformers: Dark of the Moon (2011)
  - Transformers: The Last Knight (2017)
- Twister (1996)
- Twister's Revenge! (1988)
- True Lies (1994)
- United 93 (2006)
- X-15 (1961)
- The Young Lions (1958)
- I Wanted Wings (1941)
- We Were Soldiers (2002)
- Wonder Woman 1984 (2020)
- What Price Glory (1952)
- Windtalkers (2002)
- Wings (1927)
- Wild America (1997)

The website Spy Culture compiled a list of 410 DoD-sponsored movies.

The CIA collaborated extensively in the production of the 2012 film Zero Dark Thirty.

The documentary Theaters of War (2022) says that more than 2,500 films and TV shows have been supervised by the military, mostly, as well as the security services.

In 2023, DoD production assistance agreements supported television shows such as: America’s Got Talent, Downey’s Dream Cars, Guy’s All-American Road Trip, The Jennifer Hudson Show, The Kelly Clarkson Show, and The Price Is Right.

== Music videos ==
Katy Perry's 2012 music video "Part of Me", in which she signs up to join the Marines, was shot at USMC Camp Pendleton in Oceanside, California, with the support of the Marines.

On YouTube, a new music video genre appeared, the military music videos. Typically, these are video clips portraying singers in military equipment and surrounded by military vehicles and weapons. This video genre is used by a number of armed forces across the globe (list of examples below)

- Azerbaijan's State Border Service: QƏLƏBƏNİN YOLLARI
- National Army of Colombia: Espada de Honor
- People's Liberation Army: Battle Declaration
- Russian Airborne Forces:
- Iraqi Army: شمس المصلاوي - انا عراقية

The United States Air Force has an official rock band, Max Impact, and released a punk version of its official anthem. In early 2019, the U.S. Army released a promotional military hip hop video, "Giving All I Got", with the explicit intent to get the attention of the younger crowd.

== Video games ==
In his book From Sun Tzu to Xbox, Ed Halter wrote "The technologies that shape our culture have always been pushed forward by war". Video games "were not created directly for military purposes, [they] arose out of an intellectual environment whose existence was entirely predicated on defense research". The first known virtual military training equipment, a flight simulator made of wood, was created in the 1920s by Edward Link. Since the Second World War, the U.S. Army and its sub-agencies played a major role in the development of digital computers. The DARPA, an agency of the DoD, contributed to the development of Advanced computing systems, computer graphics, the Internet, multiplayer networked systems, and the 3-D navigation of virtual environments.

Arguably the first video game (faux-military simulation), the PDP-1-powered Spacewar!, was developed in 1962. The U.S. Army's first video game created for training purposes, the board game Mech War, was implemented in the staff officer training curriculum in the 1970s at the Army War College. During the 1980s, Academic and military researchers led the development of distributed interactive simulations (DIS) that enable the creation of real-time, virtual theaters of war. The release by Atari of the game Battlezone was a revolution for the graphics perspective, introducing first-person shooter games for the first time. Donn A. Starry, head of the United States Army Training and Doctrine Command (TRADOC), said in a conference in 1981: "[Today's soldiers have] learned to learn in a different world, ... a world of television, electronic toys and games, computers, and a host of other electronic devices. They belong to a TV and technology generation... [so] how is it that our soldiers are still sitting in classrooms, still listening to lectures, still depending on books and other paper reading materials, when possibly new and better methods have been available for many years?" The Air Force captain Jack A. Thorpe developed SIMNET with DARPA, a real-time distributed networking to modernize virtual simulation capacities and enable soldiers to experience war situation in times of peace. The magazine Wired argued this was the real embryo of the Internet.

After the first-person-shooter hit Doom came out in 1993, the Marine Corps Modeling and Simulation Office (MCMSO) released the online Personal Computer Based Wargames Catalog where Army personnel published detailed reviews of the video games they investigated. Doom became the MCMSO's absolute preference, and in 1995, the game Marine Doom was released, and the alien-themed graphics of the game's first version was replaced by military-themed graphics.

Dave Anthony, a writer for Call of Duty, left his job and became an "unknown conflict" adviser for the Department of Defense.

The video game Homefront was created by John Milius, who also wrote/directed the 1984 war film Red Dawn that gave its name to the Operation Red Dawn which led to the capture of Saddam Hussein.

Sometimes the military will create their own games, such as America's Army, a free first-person shooter that was intended to educate and recruit prospective soldiers.

== Professional sports ==
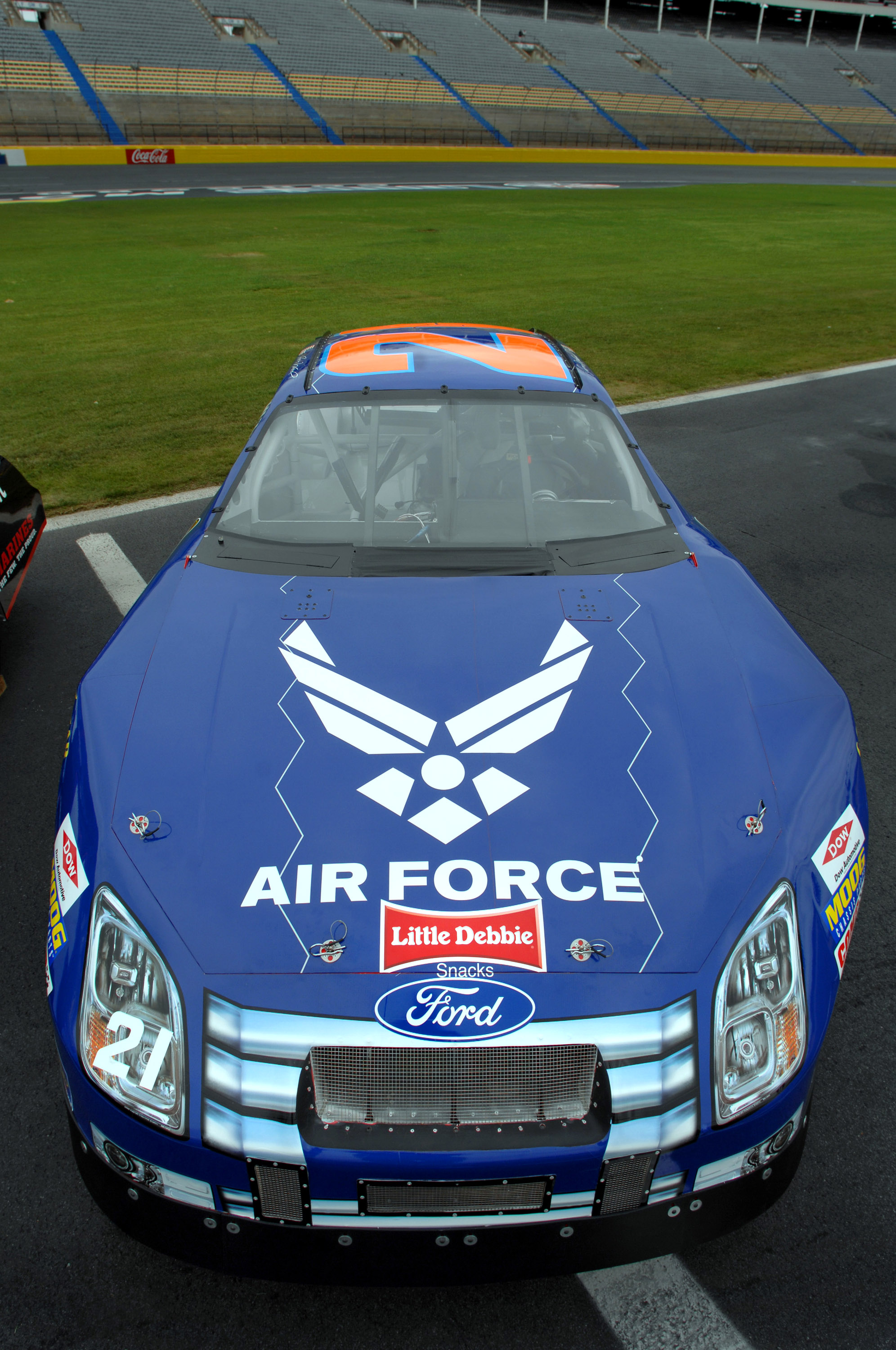
The U.S. Air Force's NASCAR No. 21 is parked May 8, 2007 on display at an unveiling ceremony at Lowe's Motor Speedway in Charlotte, N.C., in recognition of "American Heroes Memorial Day Salute to the Armed Forces".

The U.S. military has provided $53 million in funding to professional sports organizations in exchange for pro-military messaging, such as a "salute" to active duty soldiers and war veterans. This practice is common in the NFL and NASCAR with the latter's "NASCAR Salutes" program running through the entirety of May.

== Online content creation ==
In 2023, DoD approved funds for a production assistance agreement with YouTube star MrBeast for content on hurricane relief in Puerto Rico. However, the trip did not end up materializing and the agreement was cancelled.

== Film Liaison Unit heads ==
=== Philip Strub ===
Philip Meredith Strub was the head of the DoD's Film Liaison Unit from 1989 to 2018. Strub oversaw the creation of "Dara", a DoD database of all entertainment productions that had approached the department for assistance. Strub received his bachelor's degree in political science from Saint Louis University in Missouri in 1968; was commissioned as a U.S. Navy officer; and received a master's in cinema production in 1974 from the University of Southern California.

=== David Evans ===
David Evans became head of the DoD's Film Liaison Unit after Strub's retirement in 2018. Evans spent 13 years as a public affairs specialist at the DoD and then spent four years working as Strub's deputy. Less is known about Evans than even Strub. Shortly after his appointment, his LinkedIn profile was deleted.

== See also ==
- List of industrial complexes
- "New Kids on the Blecch", an episode of The Simpsons parodying the military use of popular media to engage possible recruits.
- Military–industrial complex
  - Military–industrial–media complex

== Bibliography ==
- Lenoir, Tim; Caldwell, Luke (19 February 2018). The Military-Entertainment Complex. Harvard University Press. ISBN 978-0674724983.
- Halter, Ed (31 May 2006). From Sun Tzu to Xbox. PublicAffairs. ISBN 978-1560256816.
- Alford, Matthew; Secker, Tom (27 June 2017). National Security Cinema: The Shocking New Evidence of Government Control in Hollywood. CreateSpace. ISBN 978-1548084981.
- Sirota, David (15 March 2011). Back to Our Future: How the 1980s Explain the World We Live in Now--Our Culture, Our Politics, Our Everything. Ballantine Book. ISBN 978-0345518781.
- Suid, Lawrence H. (2002). Guts & Glory: The Making of the American Military Image in Film. Lexington: University Press of Kentucky. ISBN 9780813190181.
