= Jay Kristopher Huddy =

American artist, filmmaker and video game designer

- Born: June 24, 1976 (age 50); Western New York, United States
- Occupations: Media artist, video game designer, filmmaker
- Website: huddycreative.com

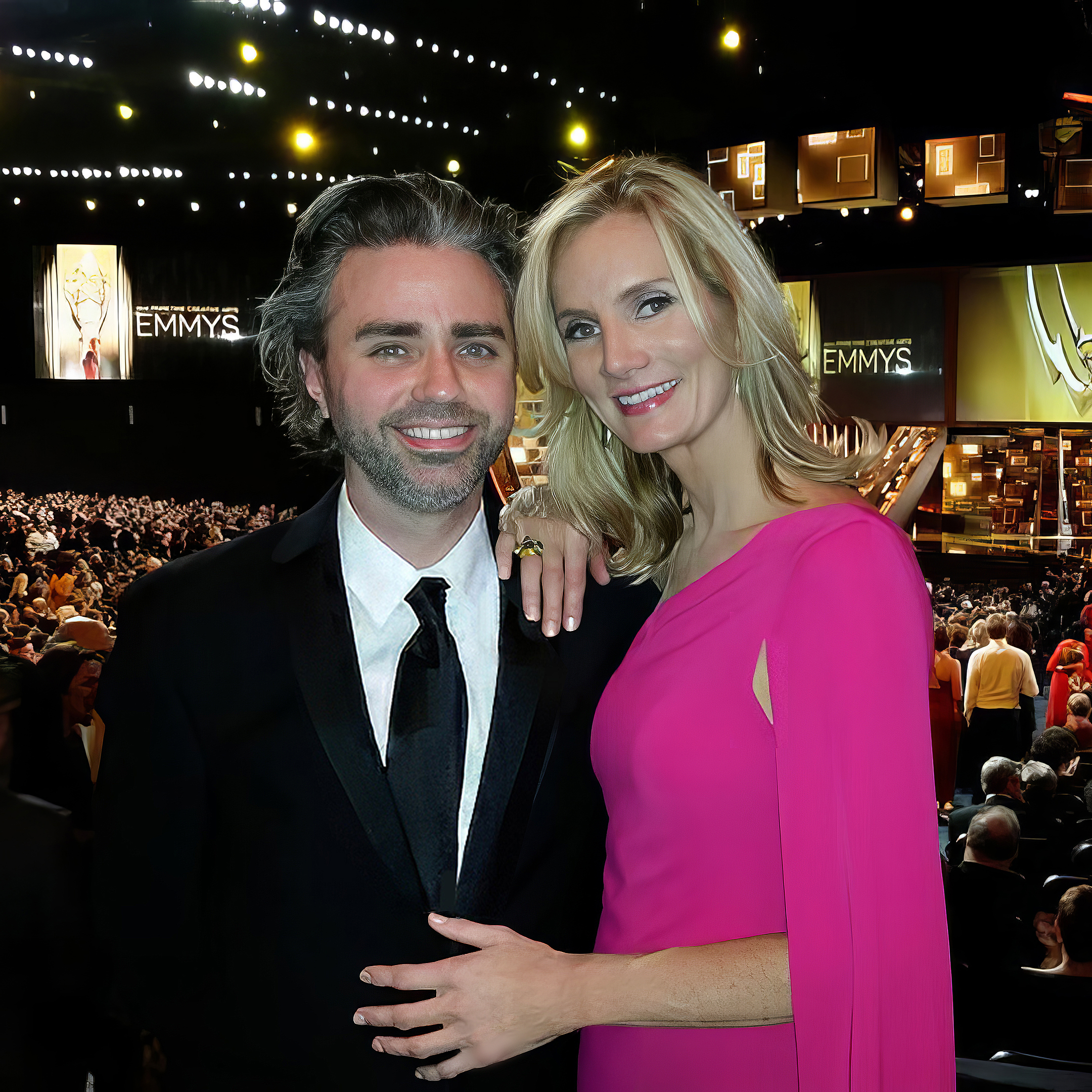
Jay Huddy and actress Beth Littleford at the 2015 Creative Arts Emmy Awards.

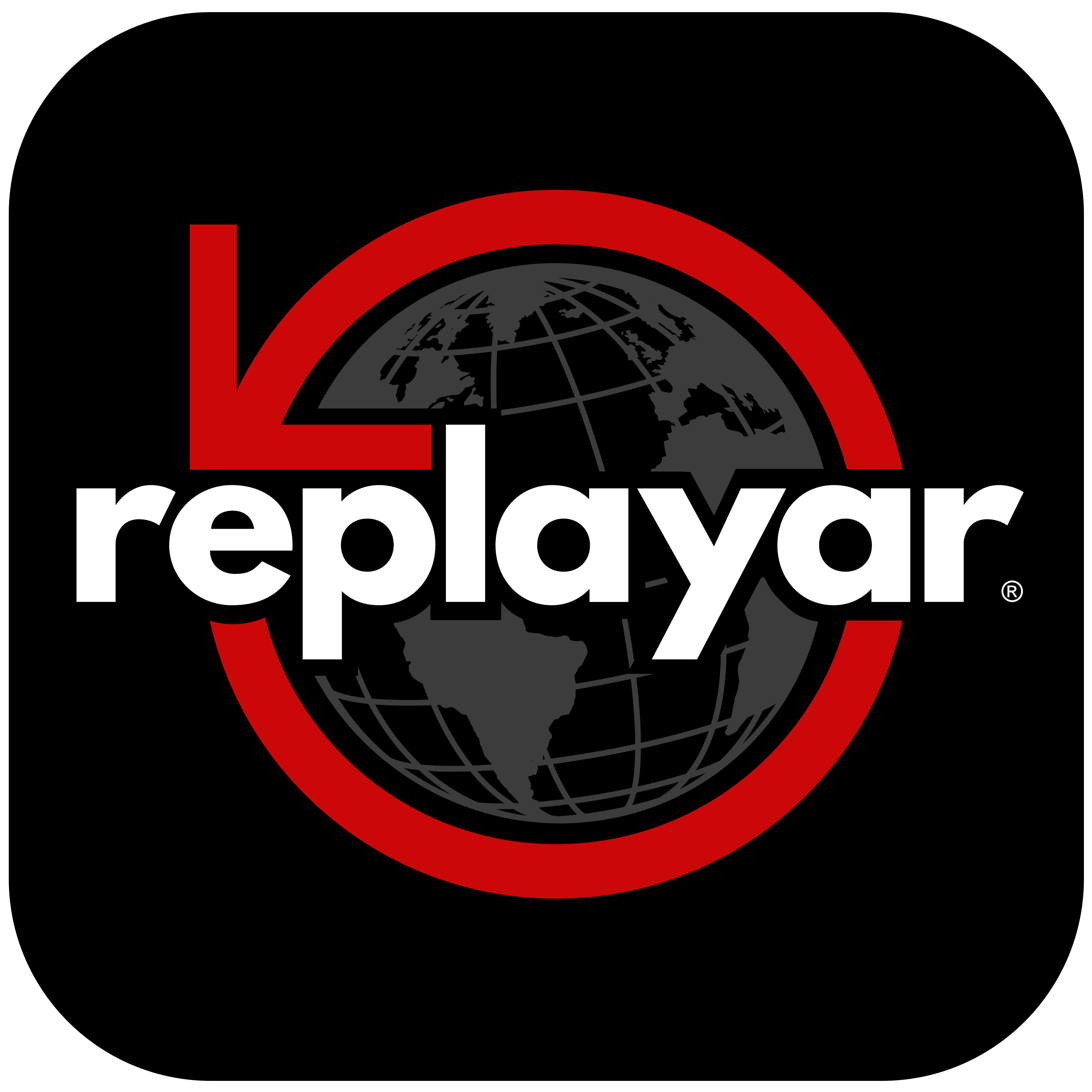
Replayar is an augmented reality social platform that allows users to geocache their photographs to be viewed in the real world.

Jay Kristopher Huddy is a Clio Award-winning artist, filmmaker, and video game designer from Western New York. He was first known for creating the video game parody Los Disneys, a first-person shooter set in a dystopian future version of Walt Disney World's Magic Kingdom based on popular urban legends and conspiracy theories. He later went on to develop television shows and another game, Blood of Bin Laden, based on news stories leading up to and following the September 11 attacks.

In his book From Sun Tzu to Xbox, former Village Voice writer Ed Halter described Huddy's work as "art that purloins mass-media culture in the pop traditions of Warhol or Rauschenberg." Huddy is based in New York City and Los Angeles, where he has worked as a digital art director for The Economist, Nickelodeon, CBS Interactive, Showtime Networks, Paramount Global, and as creative director for Looking Glass magazine.

Huddy is also the inventor of Replayar, a patented augmented reality (AR) creation and retrieval system that geocaches personal and historical photographs, allowing them to be viewed as immersive overlays at the locations where they were originally captured. He is a co-founder of Replayar, Inc. and currently serves as the company's Chief Creative Officer.
