= Lowell Mellett =

American journalist (1884–1960)

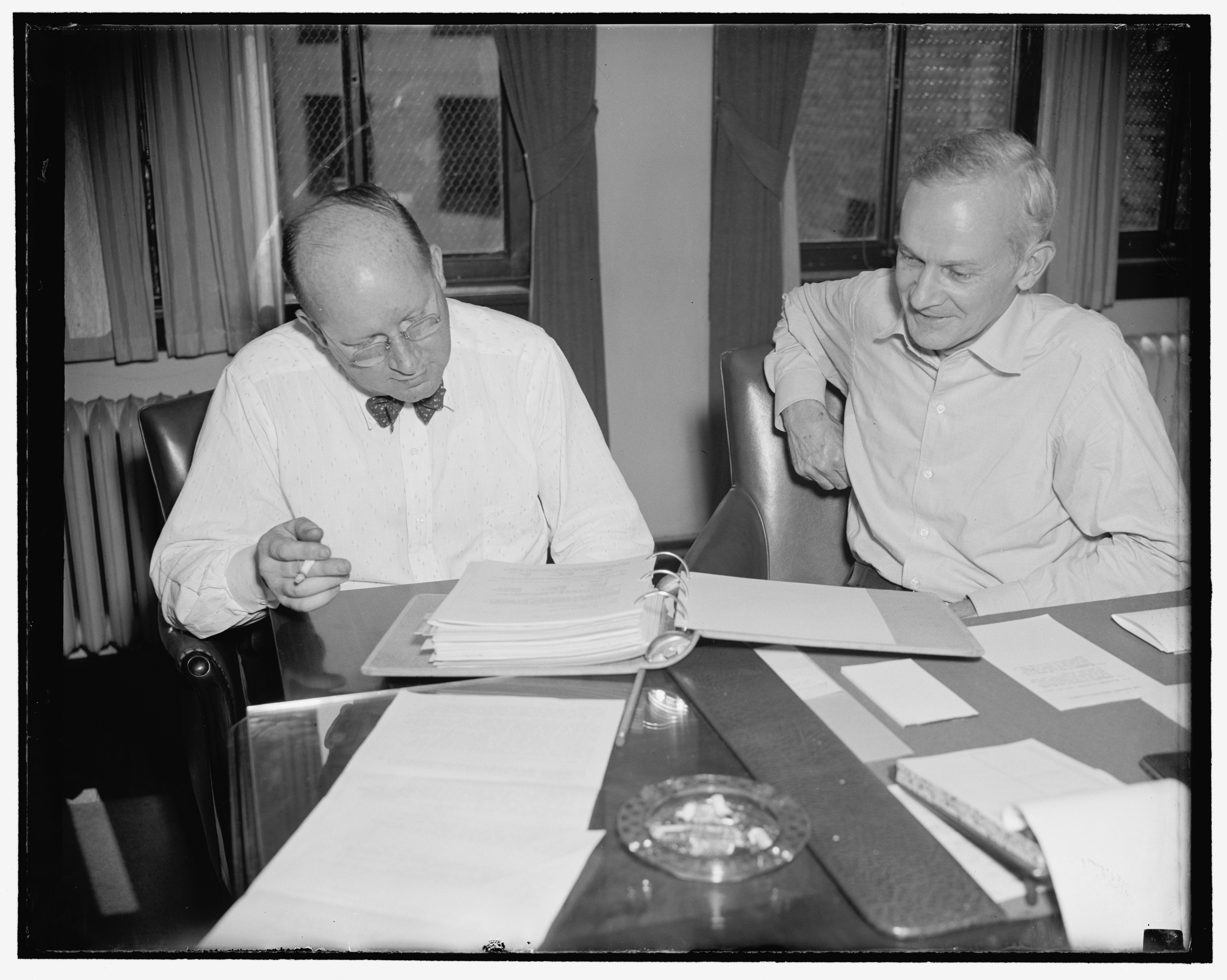
- Mellet (right) with photographer Eugene Leggett, c. 1950
- Born: February 22, 1884; Elwood, Indiana
- Died: April 6, 1960 (aged 76); Washington, D.C.
- Occupation: Journalist
- Spouse: Berthe Knatvold (m. 1914)
- Children: 1 daughter

Lowell Mellett (February 22, 1884 — April 6, 1960) was an American journalist. He is best known as chief of the Office of War Information's Bureau of Motion Pictures during World War II, and supervising the series Why We Fight.

== Early life ==
Lowell Mellett was one of seven sons born in small-town Indiana to Jesse and Margaret Mellett. Mellett claimed his interest in public affairs came from holding a torch in rallies for rivals Grover Cleveland and Benjamin Harrison since, as he wrote, "a boy could keep the torch if he was thoughtful enough to drop out of the parade before it reached the finish line." He became a journalist, covering local and then national and international affairs, editing a paper in Seattle and then Washington, DC for the Scripps-Howard Newspaper Chain. As editor at the Washington Daily News he clashed with the chain's management over Franklin D. Roosevelt's court-packing plan; immediately upon his resignation in 1937, FDR telephoned him to recruit his services. It wasn't until the following year that Mellet took his first government job, as head of the National Emergency Council.

== World War II ==
In 1939, Franklin Roosevelt appointed Mellett to head the Office of Government Reports, checking newspapers, polling the public and maintaining information officers throughout the country.

In 1942, this became the Office of War Information's Bureau of Motion Pictures (BMP). FDR, in appointing Mellet to head the BMP, wrote, "The American motion picture is one of the most effective mediums in informing and entertaining our citizens. The motion picture must remain free in so far as national security will permit. I want no censorship of the motion picture." The BMP's most successful project was Why We Fight.

== Later life ==
After the war, Lowell resigned from his government job and continued in journalism and published a number of books. He had a column in The Washington Star, saying he wrote out of "an urgent sense of danger" due to the chaotic and uncertain nature the war had left the world in. He wrote his column until his failing health forced him to retire in 1956, and he died at age 76 in April 1960.

He and his wife Berthe Knatvold (m. 1914) had one daughter together, Anne.

== Legacy ==
- There is an annual Lowell Mellett Award for Improving Journalism Through Critical Evaluation
- A discussion between Mellett and FDR, in 1940, was the first private Presidential conversation recorded on a tape system in Oval Office.
- Mellett was inducted into the Indiana Journalism Hall of Fame in 2013
