= Cinema Speakeasy =

- Established: 2009
- Location: Los Angeles, California United States
- Director: Saskia Wilson-Brown (Founder & General Manager); Georgi Goldman (Exec. Director) Fhay Arceo (Co-Director, SF) Allison Davis (Co-Director, SF) Kate Green (Co-Director, SF)
- Website: www.cinemaspeakeasy.com

Cinema Speakeasy is about a curated film screening series based on the West Coast of the United States.

Cinema Speakeasy was an ongoing series of film events centered primarily on the west coast of the United States. The program was designed to be a community-based screening series, each chapter being run by a loose-knit group of film professionals. The events provided an alternate revenue stream and distribution model for independent, experimental film by developing new audiences and creating an appetite for independent arts.

== History ==
Cinema Speakeasy was founded in June 2009 in Los Angeles by independent arts advocate Saskia Wilson-Brown. The events were subsequently managed and conceived in close collaboration with television producer Georgi Goldman, who came on as the director of the organization, and in partnership with the community-based Echo Park Film Center. In August 2009, CS hosted its first event, showcasing the film Visioneers, directed by Jared Drake. Visioneers was being distributed by Austin-based company B-Side, who had just launched their new distribution arm which relied heavily on alternative models such as microcinemas and community screenings.

The series was created to address what Wilson-Brown felt was still lacking in the film world: Namely, a fun, event-oriented and consistent screening series to showcase new content in a group setting- a place to show the films that were increasingly being self-distributed by enterprising and tech-savvy independent filmmakers. Cinema Speakeasy was thus designed to foster a community, to encourage and help DIY strategies in film distribution, and to harness alternative exhibition spaces to the benefit of independent art.

Wilson-Brown explained it in an article written by Zak Forsman on WorkBook Project in 2009:

I wanted to show – then – that DIY distribution is actually not so scary, once its broken down into smaller components. I conceived of this series to prove that the audience-led model of theatrical film exhibition at least is a feasible way to get your film shown. I also wanted to help independent filmmakers find ways to sustain (albeit in a small way) by helping raise funds for them through these screenings, while still keeping them accessible to people on small budgets.

The original Los Angeles–based events were developed on a curatorial model, overseen by Goldman and Wilson-Brown, with the occasional assistance of guest curators. Further to that, the events were designed to support independent filmmakers by splitting the revenue at the door, by helping them with marketing and promotion, and by aligning them with new audiences.

The Cinema Speakeasy format was developed to model an actionable step filmmakers and curators could take for themselves to help shatter what Wilson-Brown called "an opaque film distribution system". This format was developed in line with current discussions happening in the independent film community, centralized largely on Lance Weiler's WorkBook Project. They were also deeply inspired by the microcinema movement. Cinema Speakeasy was created on an open model, and Wilson-Brown encouraged anyone to do a Cinema Speakeasy-style event.

== Community impact ==
Soon after Cinema Speakeasy had its first event in Los Angeles, Cinema Speakeasy-inspired events started popping up across the United States. Cinema Speakeasy's most immediate effect was to help inspire filmmakers and film community leaders Zak Forsman and Kevin Shah of SABI Pictures to create their own ongoing series, Los Angeles–based CINEFIST, which developed a sophisticated revenue sharing system, and had the effect of further galvanizing the DIY film community.

In June 2010, filmmaker Nadine Patterson started hosting a Cinema Speakeasy series in Philadelphia, Pennsylvania, in partnership with Philadelphia Independent Film and Video Association (PIFVA).

Soon thereafter, in December 2010, filmmaker and film advocate Scott Grover began one in Monterey, California, in partnership with The Alternative Cafe.

Also in 2010, film and TV producers Fhay Arceo and Allison Davis approached CS with the idea of starting a chapter in San Francisco. The San Francisco edition began in October of the same year, and took place at the Gray Area Foundation for the Arts (GAFFTA) in the city's Tenderloin District. They launched with feature horror film Grace by director Paul Solet, and implemented a strong slate of diverse programming, with a focus on developing a social atmosphere.Arceo and Davis were joined in November 2010 by a third co-director, television producer Kate Sullivan Green.

== Programming ==
Cinema Speakeasy makes a stated effort to show independent film, which they define as auteur-driven, edgy and non-corporate. Some of the programs they developed include:

- Film Workshops: Short and feature film workshops of unfinished films
- Feature screenings: Curated features program, pulling from regional film festival programming and submitted films
- Shorts screenings: Curated theme-based shorts programs
- Educational programs and workshops: One on ones with film producers, showcases, panels and hands-on workshops on things that sometimes have nothing to do with film.
- Drink-Alongs: Showing films that evoke Gen X nostalgia, with drinking games.
- Special Programs: Larger events featuring curated film programs, such as 2009's 'transploitation film festival', Ultra Fabulous Beyond Drag (curated by Austin Young and Saskia Wilson-Brown)

They regularly partnered with local film and arts groups in their communities, as Cinema Speakeasy Los Angeles did with Machine Project and Kernspiracy for the Potato Type Ransom Note Workshop event, in December 2010. Additional partners include such film organizations as CINEFIST, Film Courage, WorkBook Project (for the 'One Hundred Mornings' screenings as part of the WorkBook Project Discovery and Distribution Award in 2010), and Slamdance Film Festival, Wholphin, and others.

Cinema Speakeasy stopped programming in 2011. Founder Saskia Wilson-Brown went on to start the Institute for Art and Olfaction.

== Design ==
Cinema Speakeasy logos, designed by Micah Hahn, 2010

Cinema Speakeasy's original logo was designed by San Francisco–based motion graphics and graphic designer Timothy Palmer. The original logo was a visual nod to the idea of a secret door (the speakeasy in 'Cinema Speakeasy').

In May 2010, For the organization's one-year anniversary, Cinema Speakeasy commissioned broadcast and typography designer Micah Hahn to design a new logo, as well as a 30-second introductory animation. The new logo was intended to reflect the ethos of the organization, and serves as a visual representation of Cinema Speakeasy's film-centric philosophy. Designed as an adaptable template, it can easily be amended on a monthly basis to showcase film stills from current programming. It also allowed the individual chapters of Cinema Speakeasy to tailor the visual identity of the organization to their communities - while still retaining a consistency, overall.
