= 4Columns =

American online arts criticism magazine

- Editor-in-chief: Margaret Sundell
- Categories: Arts criticism
- Frequency: Weekly
- Founder: Margaret Sundell
- First issue: September 23, 2016
- Final issue: June 26, 2026
- Country: United States
- Based in: New York City
- Language: English
- Website: www.4columns.org

4Columns was an American online magazine of arts criticism published from September 2016 through June 2026. Founded and edited by art critic Margaret Sundell, the New York–based publication covered visual art, film, literature, music, theater, dance, architecture, fashion, and other forms of contemporary culture.

The magazine ordinarily published four approximately 1,000-word reviews each week. Its name referred to this four-essay format. It was free to read, carried no advertising, and was supported by a private foundation.

== History ==
Sundell established 4Columns using money from a bequest left by her mother for philanthropic purposes.

The magazine described its intended audience as general rather than specialist and characterized criticism as a literary form capable of stimulating public discussion. Its editorial outlook was partly inspired by Charles Baudelaire's description of criticism as “partial, passionate, and political.”

Among the magazine’s regular contributors were Melissa Anderson, Brian Dillon, Aruna D’Souza, Geeta Dayal, Sasha Frere-Jones, James Hannaham, Ed Halter, Johanna Fateman, Julie Phillips, and David Cote. Anderson joined the publication as film editor in 2017. The final masthead listed Ania Szremski as senior editor, Anderson as film editor, Bonnie Chau as associate editor, and Julie Evanoff as chief information officer.

4Columns was conceived as a finite project supported for ten years. It published its final regular issue on June 26, 2026, shortly before its tenth anniversary, while retaining its online archive.

== Reception ==
Writing in American Theatre, David Cote described 4Columns as a possible “mini-ProPublica for the arts” and praised its writing and design. In a 2018 survey of contemporary arts journalism, Nieman Reports cited the magazine as an example of a publication emphasizing the craft and traditional forms of criticism rather than experimenting primarily with digital formats.
