= Cinema '76 =

Independent movie theater in Metro Manila

- Exterior of the Cinema '76 Film Society and Café, at its Tomas Morato location
- Interactive map of Cinema '76
- Address: Unit 204, 37 Scout Borromeo, Tomas Morato St., South Triangle; Quezon City; Philippines
- Coordinates: 14.6372°N 121.0357°E
- Owner: TBA Studios
- Capacity: 60
- Type: Microtheater

Construction
- Opened: February 2016
- Closed: October 25, 2026

Cinema '76, composed of the Cinema '76 Film Society and Cinema '76 Café, was an independent microtheater and café. The cinema opened in February 2016 in San Juan, Metro Manila, moving to Anonas LRT City Center in Quezon City and finally to Tomas Morato Avenue. The cinema closed on October 25, 2026.

The cinema primarily screened independent Filipino and foreign films, including those of its owner, TBA Studios. This later expanded to include screenings for mainstream films, with its programming targeted towards film enthusiasts in Metro Manila. The cinema also held private screenings and other events, including its own movie-themed quiz night.

== History ==
The Cinema '76 Film Society was opened in February 2016 by TBA Studios. Its first branch was located in Addition Hills in San Juan, and seated 50 to 60 people. The cinema was named after 1976, considered by the founders as "the last Golden Year of Philippine Cinema." On June 8, 2018, Cinema '76 opened its second branch at the Anonas LRT City Center in Quezon City, directly connected to Anonas station of the LRT 2. The new branch included two screening rooms, one similar to their San Juan branch with 60 seats (named the "MP4 Room"), and a larger room (the "DCP Room") fitting 120 to 130 people.

Cinema '76's resident adopted cats, Toyo and Quezo

As the COVID-19 pandemic developed, quarantine restrictions forced the closure of cinemas in Metro Manila, including Cinema '76. In November 2020, it introduced Cinema '76@Home, which screened its usual programming of films online. The cinema's al fresco movie-themed café, Cinema '76 Café, opened on June 11, 2021, separated by a mezzanine from the Anonas cinema. It was initially envisioned in 2018 as a space for film enthusiasts to talk after screenings. Due to the extended closures, Cinema '76 closed its San Juan branch on September 15 that year. Plans to reopen the Anonas branch remained despite the San Juan branch's closure, ultimately reopening after restrictions on cinemas were lifted after 19 months, in November 2021.

The Anonas branch had its last screening in October 4, 2022, in preparation for a move to the Terraces Building, on the corner of Tomas Morato Avenue and Scout Borromeo St. The new location had the café and cinema on the same floor, with both al fresco and indoor, air-conditioned dining as a new option. It featured only one screening room, seating up to 60 people. The cinema reopened on November 23, followed by the café on March 18, 2023. After the move to Tomas Morato, the cinema adopted three cats: Heneral Luya (a play on Heneral Luna), Heneral Toyo (on Goyo), and President Quezo (on Quezon). Luya and Toyo were stray kittens found at the café and rescued by TBA Studios president Daphne Chiu. Luya was later brought home by Chiu, while Toyo remained at the café. On September 29, 2026, Cinema '76 announced it would close permanently on October 25, 2026. No reason was given for its closure.

== Programming ==
Cinema '76 initially opened as a distribution venue for local filmmakers, particularly for independent films with limited runs in larger cinemas. Programming catered to film enthusiasts in the Metro Manila area. Showings initially focused on Filipino classics and present-day indie films, with occasional films from foreign film festivals. As Cinema '76 moved to Anonas, it began showing films that were screening in larger cinemas. After the cinema reopened following the pandemic, it also began screening a mix of foreign and local films, including those from the mainstream.

Cinema '76 was known for hosting post-film talkbacks and Q&As with filmmakers. Since its opening in San Juan, Cinema '76 served as a venue for private screenings. The cinema later expanded to host other events, including fan events and comedy shows, as well as the Cinema '76 Movie Quiz Night.
