= Industrial complex =

Socioeconomic concept

The industrial complex is a socioeconomic concept wherein businesses become entwined in social or political systems or institutions, creating or bolstering a profit economy from these systems. Such a complex is said to pursue its own interests regardless of, and often at the expense of, the best interests of society and individuals. Businesses within an industrial complex may have been created to advance a social or political goal, but mostly profit when the goal is not reached. The industrial complex may profit financially, or ideologically, from maintaining socially detrimental or inefficient systems.

Virtually all institutions in sectors ranging from agriculture, medicine, entertainment, and media, to education, criminal justice, security, and transportation, began reconceiving and reconstructing in accordance with capitalist, industrial, and bureaucratic models with the aim of realizing profit, growth, and other imperatives. In The Global Industrial Complex, edited by American philosopher and activist Steven Best, the "power complex" first analyzed by sociologist Charles Wright Mills 1956 work The Power Elite, is shown to have evolved into a global array of "corporate-state" structures, an interdependent and overlapping systems of domination.

The concept of the military–industrial complex has been also expanded to include the entertainment and creative industries as well. For an example in practice, Matthew Brummer describes Japan's Manga Military and how the Ministry of Defense uses popular culture and the moe that it engenders to shape domestic and international perceptions.

James Der Derian's book Military–Industrial–Media–Entertainment Network relates the convergence of cyborg technologies, video games, media spectacles, war movies, and "do-good ideologies" into what generates a mirage, as he claims, of high-tech, and low-risk "virtuous wars." American political activist and former Central Intelligence Agency officer Ray McGovern denounces the fact that, as he claims, American citizens are vulnerable to anti-Russian propaganda since few of them know the Soviet Union's major role in World War II victory, and blames for this the "corporate-controlled mainstream media." He goes on to label the culprits as the Military–Industrial–Congressional–Intelligence–Media–Academia–Think-Tank complex.

== History ==
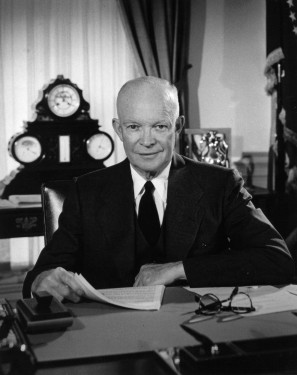
President Dwight D. Eisenhower famously warned about the "military–industrial complex" in his farewell address, 17 January 1961.

The concept was popularized by President Dwight Eisenhower in his 17 January 1961 farewell speech. Eisenhower described a "threat to democratic government" called the military–industrial complex. This complex involved the military establishment gaining "unwarranted influence" over the economic, political, and spiritual realms of American society due to the profitability of the US arms industry and the number of citizens employed in various branches of military service, the armaments industry, and other businesses providing goods to the US army. The "complex" arises from the creation of a multilateral economy serving military goals, as well as the paradox that arises from the goal of the multilateralism (sustained profit) as antithetical to the military's theoretical goal (peace).

In his 2025 farewell address, outgoing U.S. President Joe Biden warned of a 'tech–industrial complex', stating that "Americans are being buried under an avalanche of misinformation and disinformation, enabling the abuse of power." Commentators noted that this statement was made following Elon Musk's upcoming role in the second Donald Trump administration and public overtures towards Trump by technology industry leaders including Meta's Mark Zuckerberg and Amazon's Jeff Bezos, including the dismantling of Facebook's fact-checking program.

During Congressional hearings, in both houses, throughout 2024 and 2025, there was extensive debate and discussion regarding the censorship-industrial complex.

== Operations ==
In many cases, the industrial complex refers to a conflict of interest between an institution's purported socio-political purpose and the financial interests of the businesses and government agencies that profit from the pursuit of such purpose, when achieving the stated purpose would result in a financial loss for those businesses. For example, the purported purpose of the US penal system is to assist offenders in becoming law abiding citizens yet the prison–industrial complex subsists upon high inmate populations, thus relying on the penal system's failure to meet its goal of criminal reform and re-entry. In these types of cases, government agencies are often thought to profit financially from institutional industrialization, perhaps eroding their motivation to legislate such institutions in ways that may be socially beneficial.

The industrial complex concept has also been used informally to denote the artificial creation, inflation, or manipulation of an institution's societal value in order to increase profit opportunities, especially through specialty businesses and niche products. An example of this is the marriage industrial complex, where demand for wedding dress makers, wedding venues, wedding planners, wedding cake bakers, wedding rentals companies, wedding photographers, etc, is created by the perceived social necessity of an elaborate wedding ceremony.

== Examples ==
- AI–Industrial Complex — The AI industrial complex is a critique of the growing and intertwined power of AI corporations, governments, and related institutions, drawing a parallel to the military–industrial complex. Critics allege that powerful entities manipulate public policy and public perception for their own gain while framing AI advancements as a matter of national security or competitiveness.
- Military–Industrial Complex — Businesses that supply the army with uniforms, artillery, etc, profit from the continuation of war and will be hurt by peace.
- Prison–Industrial Complex — Businesses access labor from prisoners that is cheaper than civilian labor, thus they profit from high incarceration rates.
- Medical–Industrial Complex — Hospitals and pharmaceutical companies require patients to be sick, thus business interests are at odds with the goal of making people healthy. Inflation of drug and hospital prices contribute to the rising expense of healthcare in the United States.
- Animal–Industrial Complex — Systematic and institutionalized exploitation of non-human animals, which requires breeding and killing animals in the billions in what has come to be known as the "animal holocaust", threatening human survival and resulting in environmental destruction such as climate change, ocean acidification, biodiversity loss, spread of zoonotic diseases, and the sixth mass extinction.
- Wedding/Marriage–Industrial Complex — Wedding-related businesses and vendors profit from the growing extravagance and cost of weddings and will be negatively impacted by smaller, cheaper events or elopements, thus they perpetuate the pressure on brides to have expensive weddings.
- Military–entertainment complex — The scope of the military–industrial complex has broadened to include cultural and media sectors, giving rise to what modern scholarship has dubbed the military–entertainment complex. This term refers to forms of cooperation between military institutions and entertainment industries, in which the military may provide equipment, personnel, technical expertise, or other forms of support to filmmakers, video game developers, and related media producers. In the United States in particular, such collaborations have contributed to films, games, and other media that depict military themes and operations. In some cases, media production has been developed with direct military involvement, such as America's Army, a video game created by the U.S. Army for recruitment and public outreach purposes. Through these interactions, entertainment media can play a role in shaping public understanding of military activities and warfare, extending the influence of military institutions beyond traditional domains such as production and procurement, into areas of cultural and media production.
- Non-profit industrial complex, or "NPIC", is a term which is used by social justice activists to describe the way non-profit organizations, governments, and businesses are related. The academic genealogy of the term follows the lineage of what social justice activists and scholars such as Angela Davis and Mike Davis (no relation) have called the Prison-Industrial Complex, which, too, follows an earlier critique of the military-industrial complex. Many activists carry out their work as employees of or with the assistance of non-profit organizations. Many of their goals need money in order to be achieved, and nonprofits are registered with the government in order to be allowed to receive large amounts of money legally. These activist nonprofits usually get money from even bigger nonprofits, which are connected to big businesses and rich people who control industries. But because many activists criticize things in society that businesses and rich people support, they might not get the money if they are too critical. So in order to stay funded, they may have to change the ideas they have for improving society to be more acceptable to industry. People who believe these kinds of relationships between activists and industries are harmful to activism use the term non-profit industrial complex as a faster way to discuss these relationships, instead of explaining the whole system each time. They have written many articles and books describing the effects of the NPIC by studying patterns of funding or discussing how the goals of some activists changed once their movements began to receive more money.

== Applications ==
The following have been considered examples of industrial complexes:

- AI Industrial Complex
- Academic–industrial complex
- Animal–industrial complex
- Athletic–industrial complex
- Baby or diaper–industrial complex
- Celebrity–industrial complex
- Corporate consumption complex.
- Entertainment-industrial complex
- Global–industrial complex
- Immigration–industrial complex or border–industrial complex
- Medical–industrial complex or medical–pharmacological industrial complex
- Military–industrial complex
  - Military-digital complex
  - Military-entertainment complex
  - Military–industrial–media complex
- Nonprofit–industrial complex or NGO–industrial complex
- Peace–industrial complex
- Pharmaceutical–industrial complex
- Politico-media complex
- Poverty industrial complex
- Prison–industrial complex or criminal (justice) industrial complex
- Tech-industrial complex
- White savior industrial complex
