= Pentagon military analyst program =

US propaganda campaign, launched 2002

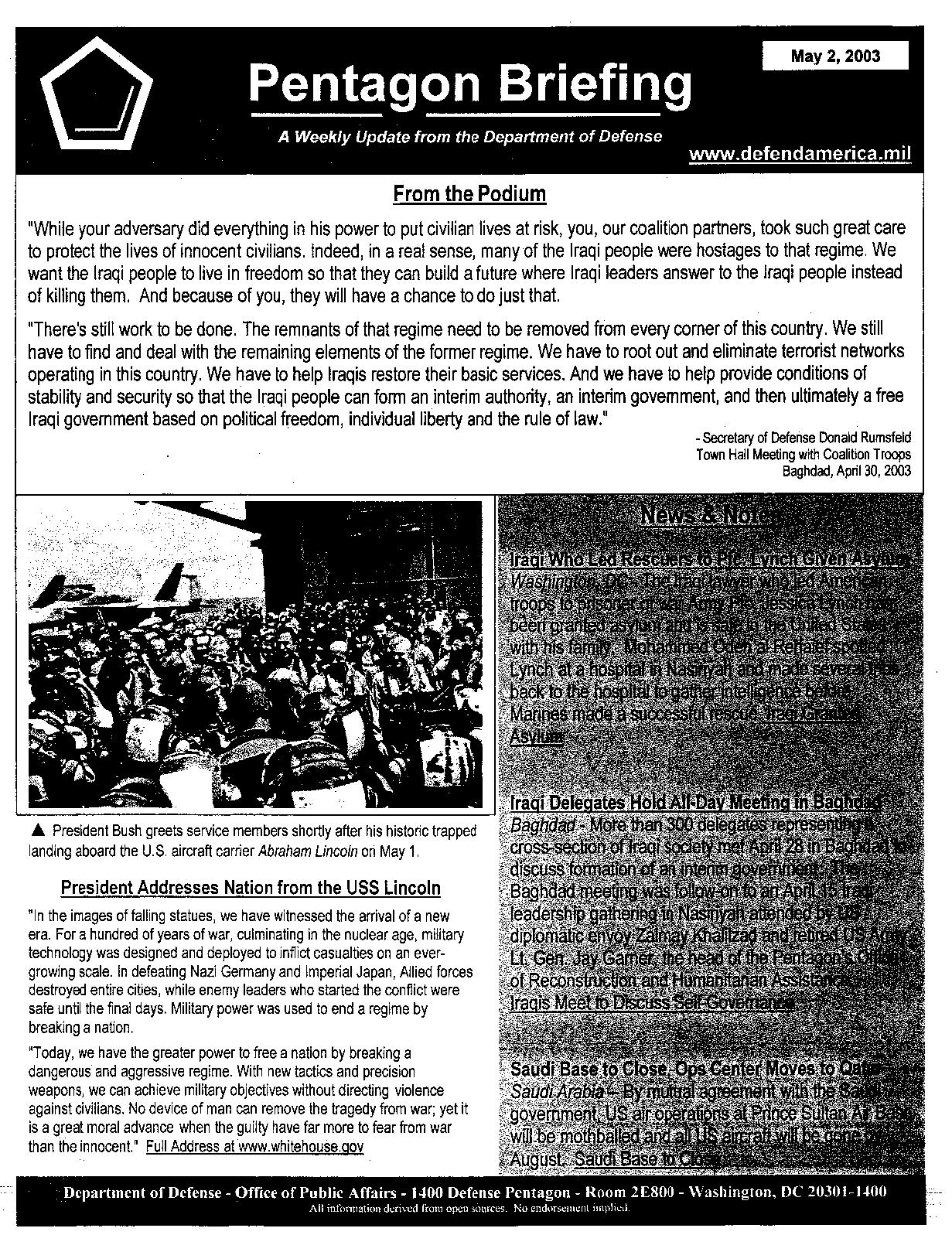
A page from one of the weekly public affairs briefings distributed from defendamerica.mil in May 2003

The Pentagon military analyst program was a propaganda campaign of the U.S. Department of Defense (DoD) that was launched in early 2002 by then-Assistant Secretary of Defense for Public Affairs Victoria Clarke. The goal of the operation is "to spread the administration's talking points on Iraq by briefing retired commanders for network and cable television appearances," where they have been presented as independent analysts. A Pentagon spokesman said the Pentagon's intent was to keep the American people informed about the so-called war on terror by providing prominent military analysts with factual information and frequent, direct access to key military officials. The Times article suggests that the analysts had undisclosed financial conflicts of interest and were given special access as a reward for promoting the administration's point of view. On 28 April 2008, the Pentagon ended the operation. A DoD Inspector General investigation found no wrongdoing on the part of the DoD.

== New York Times exposé ==
Details of the operation were first revealed in a lengthy New York Times exposé written by David Barstow and published in April 2008. Within the documents the analysts were referred to as message force multipliers (q.v. force multiplication).

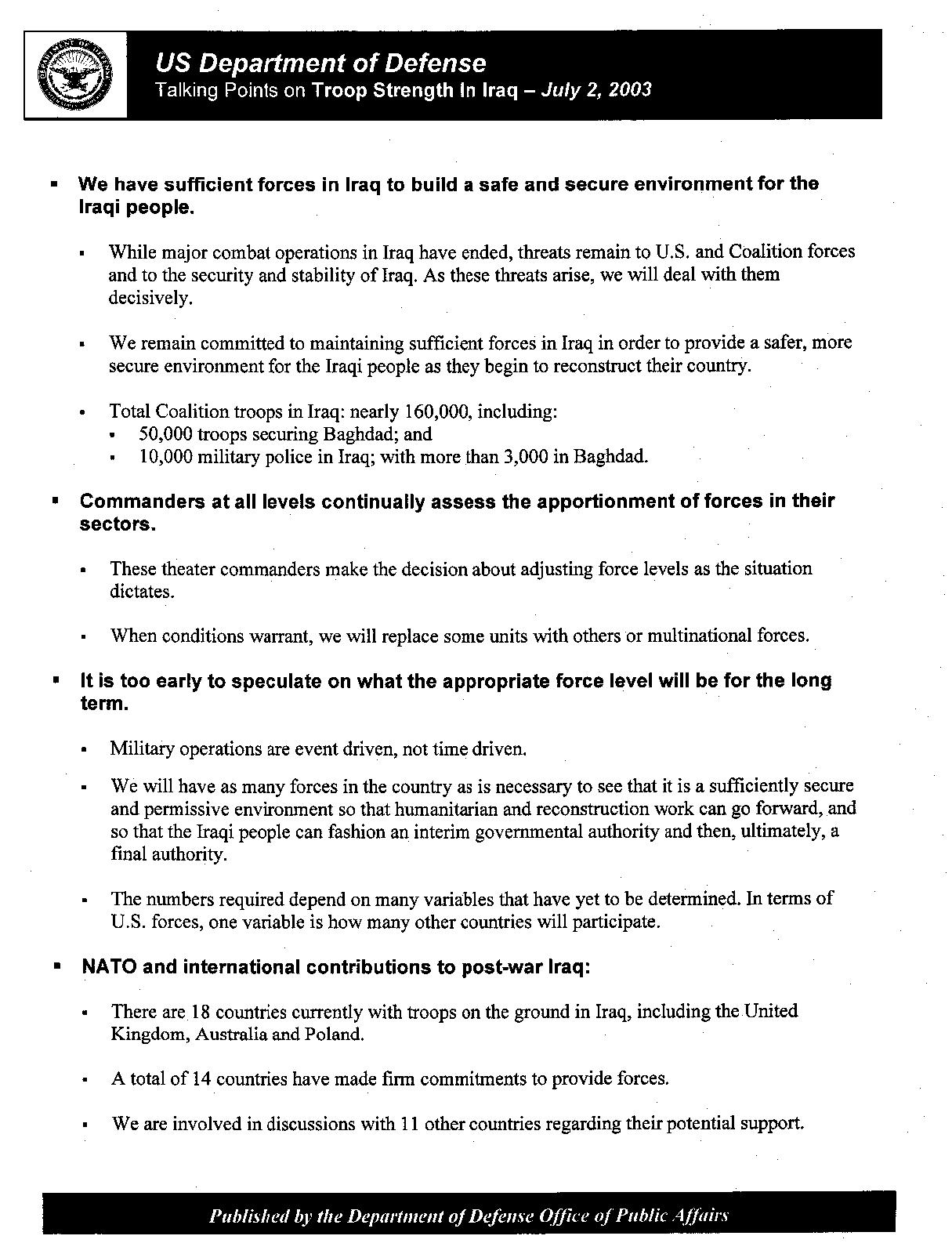
An example of the talking points handed out to the analysts. These from July 2003 contend the U.S. had sufficient troops numbers to maintain order after the invasion.

A number of the military analysts used by US television have extensive business interests in promoting the administration's views as employees of, or investors in, various military contractors or as lobbyists for such contractors; however, viewers have not been made aware of such ties. Peace activist Colman McCarthy had warned of the potential conflicts of interest many of the same analysts had in a Washington Post op-ed in April 2003.

The analysts were given access to hundreds of private briefings with senior military leaders, including officials with significant influence over budget and contracting matters, taken on official tours to Iraq, and given access to classified intelligence. Some participants claimed that they were instructed not to quote their briefers directly or otherwise describe their contacts with the Pentagon.

The Times article states that: "Some analysts stated that in later interviews that they echoed the Pentagon's talking points, even when they suspected the information was false or inflated." Robert S. Bevelacqua, a critic of the Bush administration, retired Green Beret and former Fox News analyst said, "It was them saying, 'We need to stick our hands up your back and move your mouth for you.", although Bevelacqua himself opposed the War in Iraq during the time he claims to have been briefed by Pentagon officials. Bevelacqua left Fox in April 2005 due to his dissatisfaction with Fox's coverage of the war.

According to the DoD, from 2002 to 2008, the program held 147 events for 74 military analysts, including 22 meetings at the Pentagon, 114 conference calls with generals and senior Pentagon officials and 11 DoD-sponsored trips to Iraq and Guantanamo Bay, Cuba. Donald Rumsfeld was personally involved with 20 of the events. During that time, four analysts were removed from the program's invitation list for, reportedly, making public remarks critical of the DoD. Forty-three of the analysts involved in the program were employed by or affiliated with defense contractors which were doing or seeking to obtain contracts from the DoD.

== Impact and response ==
CBS, NBC, and Fox did not comment on the involvement of their analysts. With the exception of two mentions on PBS, there has been a de facto blackout of this story by the networks. The Times itself published "at least" nine op-eds by the analysts. Andrew Rosenthal, editorial page editor of the Times, said that none of the op-ed's dealt specifically with assessments of the war or any specific business entities with which the author had ties. The Pentagon also helped two of the retired commanders write an article in The Wall Street Journal, "forwarded talking points and statistics to rebut the notion" of a spreading "General's revolt" against Donald Rumsfeld in April 2006 (q.v.).

Katrina vanden Heuvel, editor of the progressive publication The Nation, urged the U.S. Congress to investigate the program, and Free Press launched an online petition also supporting such an investigation.

On 23 April 2008, Carl Levin, chair of the US Senate Armed Services Committee, asked the Pentagon to investigate the practice.

The following day, 24 April 2008, Representative Rosa DeLauro (D-Conn.) sent letters to five network executives. Only ABC and CNN responded.

On 6 May 2008, DeLauro sent a letter together with John Dingell (D-Mich.) to Federal Communications Commission Chairman Kevin J. Martin "urging an investigation of the Pentagon's propaganda program" to determine if the networks or analysts violated federal law. Furthermore, Senators John Kerry (D-Mass.) and Russ Feingold (D-Wis.) wrote to Congress's investigative arm, the Government Accountability Office (GAO).

On 22 May 2008, the House passed an amendment to the annual military authorization bill that would mandate investigations of the program by both the inspector general's office at the Defense Department and the GAO. The inspector general's office announced that it would investigate the matter, whereas the GAO announced that it had already begun doing so.

== Department of Defense investigation and Pulitzer Prize ==
In January 2009, the US Department of Defense (DoD) Inspector General (IG) released the report of its investigation. The report rejected most of the allegations from Barstow's New York Times story. The DoD report concluded that the evidence was, "insufficient to conclude that [Retired Military Analyst] RMA outreach activities were improper. Further, we found insufficient basis to conclude that [the office of public affairs] conceived of or undertook a disciplined effort to assemble a contingent of influential RMAs who could be depended on to comment favorably on DoD programs." Concerning the contract controversy, the investigation found that, "extensive searches found no instance where such RMAs used information or contacts obtained as a result of the OASD(PA) outreach program to achieve a competitive advantage for their company." The report stated that 29 percent of the RMA had some type of corporate association.

In April 2009, the Pulitzer Committee announced that it would be awarding a Pulitzer Prize for Investigative Reporting to The New York Times and David Barstow for the RMA expose'. RMAs such as US Air Force Lieutenant General Tomas G. McInerney and Army Major General Paul E. Vallely reacted angrily to the announcement, citing the DoD IG's investigation which the RMA's stated had "discredited" the Times story. Barstow replied that the Times public editor, Clark Hoyt, had found the DoD IG's investigation "highly flawed" and labeled it a "whitewash."

On May 6, 2009 a story by Barstow in The New York Times revealed that Donald M. Horstman, the DoD's deputy inspector general, had repudiated the DoD investigation report, stating that an internal review found that the report, "did not meet accepted quality standards" and "relied on a body of testimonial evidence that was insufficient or inconclusive." According to Horstman, the review found that Pentagon officials who had devised and managed the analyst program had refused to speak to DoD investigators. The review also found that the investigation's methodology was seriously flawed. Horstman added that no additional investigative work would be done to reissue the report because the analyst program has been terminated and the senior officials who oversaw it no longer work for the DoD.

On May 7, 2009 The Washington Times reported that the DoD IG had reviewed and withdrawn the report after being pressured by Senator Carl Levin, Chairman of the United States Senate Committee on Armed Services, to do so. Levin reportedly sent a letter to Defense Secretary Robert M. Gates on February 2, 2009 rejecting the report and asking the DoD IG to conduct a second investigation. The Washington Times noted that Barstow, in his May 6 story in The New York Times about the pulled report, had failed to disclose Levin's involvement.

== Further investigation ==
The Government Accountability Office (GAO), with assistance from the Comptroller General of the United States, released a report on its investigation into the program in July 2009. The GAO confirmed as true the allegations that retired general officers had been given special access to military briefings and facilities for the purpose of influencing public opinion when the retired officers commented in the news media. The GAO concluded, however, that the DoD had not violated any laws with its conduct of the program, because government agencies have traditionally been given wide leeway in how they inform the public about their work. Daniel Gordon, acting general counsel for the GAO, stated that, "While DoD understandably values its ties with retired military officers, we believe that, before undertaking anything along the lines of the now-terminated program at issue in this decision, DoD should consider whether it needs to have additional policies and procedures in place to protect the integrity of, and public confidence in, its public affairs efforts and to ensure the transparency of its public relations activities."

The Federal Communications Commission, in response to the GAO report and urging from Representative John Dingell, stated that it was investigating whether television broadcasters broke "payola" rules on proper disclosure of sponsorship when they used the military analysts. The DoD was continuing to examine the issue under the direction of new DoD IG director Gordon Haddell.

The DoD IG released its investigation report in December 2011. The report found no wrongdoing by the DoD, concluding that it had acted in compliance with government policies and regulation in running the program.

== See also ==
- Enemy Image, a documentary about The Pentagon's approach to news coverage of war
- Force multiplier
- Information warfare
- Military–industrial–media complex
- Pentagon rapid response operation
- Propaganda in the United States
- Smith-Mundt Act
