= Enemy Image =

- Directed by: Mark Daniels
- Written by: Mark Daniels
- Produced by: Benedicte Massiet; Christine Le Goff
- Narrated by: Jessy Joe Walsh
- Cinematography: John Hazard; Ned Burgess
- Edited by: Catherine Peix; Pascal Vernier
- Production companies: Multimedia France Productions]; France 2; Canadian Broadcasting Corporation; SBS Television; YLE
- Release date: October 14, 2005 (Sheffield International Documentary Festival)
- Running time: 93 minutes
- Country: France
- Language: English

Enemy Image is a 2005 documentary film by Mark Daniels about the portrayal of warfare in television news. Narrated by Jessy Joe Walsh, the film includes archive footage of Peter Jennings, Morley Safer, Jon Alpert, Dan Rather, and Bernard Birnbaum in their news reporting on the various conflicts.

== Synopsis ==
The film makes note of how the invasion of Iraq lasted 800 hours but produced over 20,000 hours of video, and focuses initially on the Vietnam War as the first war ever televised "live". During this war the American government allowed reporters onto the battlefield with little supervision or control. The documentary follows the way The Pentagon learned from this experience to control access by journalists to battle areas in subsequent wars, through the Invasion of Grenada (where journalists were excluded completely) to the first Gulf War, where news packages were provided by the military, to the embedded journalism of the Iraq War. The theme of the film is the progressive tightening of control by the US military on the contact journalists have with soldiers and civilians in the war zone, in order that (as the film says at the end) "never again will television raise the moral and political questions that face a people at war."

== Screenings ==
The film premiered October 14, 2005 at the Sheffield International Documentary Festival, and aired on Canadian television later in 2005.

== See also ==
- Dispatches
- Information warfare
- Pentagon military analyst program
- Public affairs (military)
