= Military–digital complex =

Link between militaries and cyberwarfare

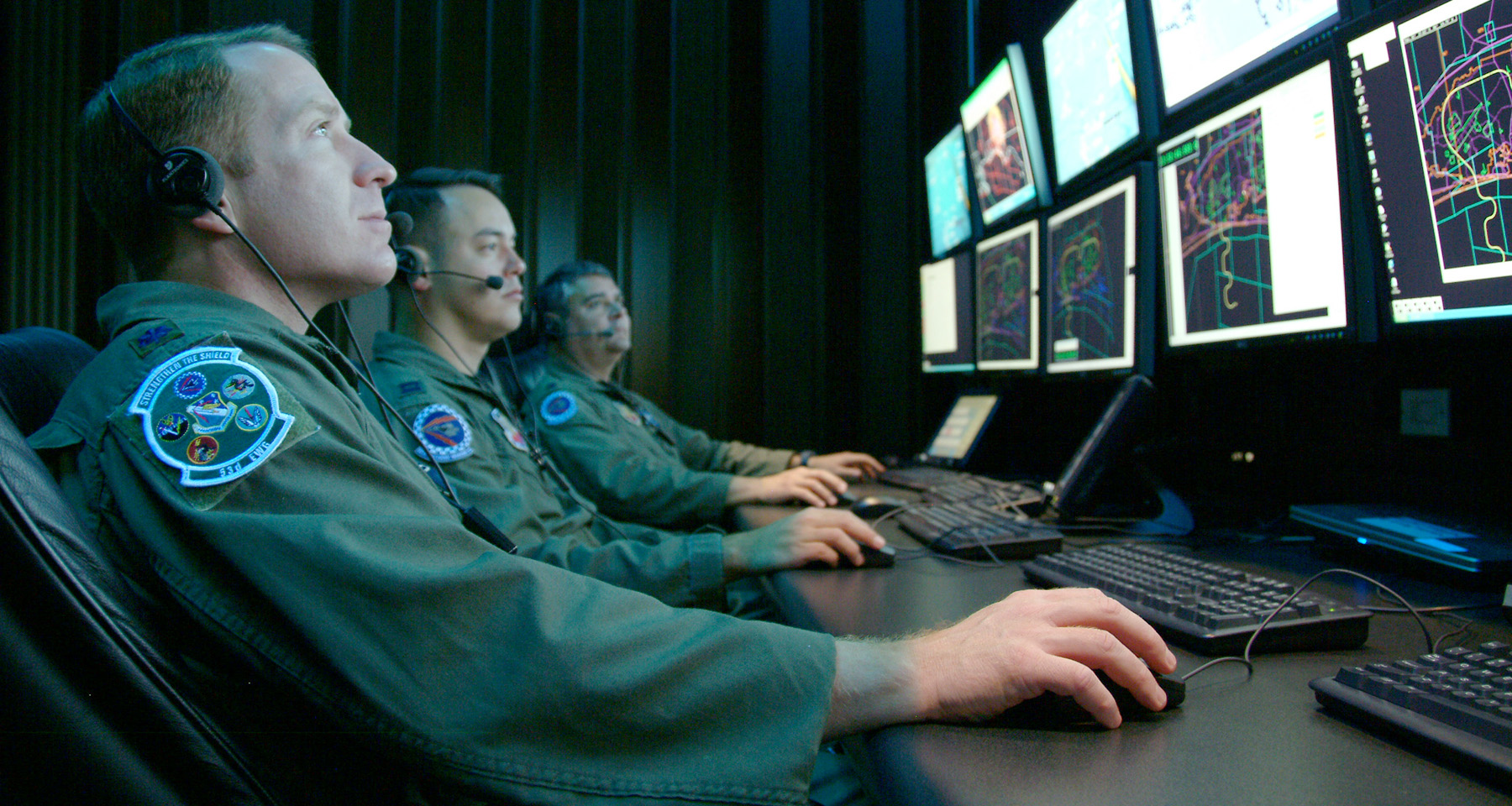
Cyber-warriors, the implementation of thousands of Governmental Cyber Security Specialists displays the prevalence of the Cyber threat which has subsequently led to the military–digital complex.

The military–digital complex (MDC) is the militarization of cyber operations by governments and corporations, often through monetary relationships between computer programmers in private companies and the military to combat the threat of cyber terrorism and warfare. Cyber operations since 2000 have increased dramatically, with the recent branch of the US Strategic Command the United States Cyber Command. Cyber operations has been defined by the Washington Post as,

"Offensive and defensive cyber (or digital) warfare, including the fields of computer network attack, computer network exploitation and computer network defense; as well as traditional electronic warfare (e.g., jamming) intended to deny an adversary use of their electronically dependent equipment through "non-kinetic" means—that is, by fighting with electrons rather than explosives."

As cyber attacks become an increasingly common threat to the security of civilians and highly classified governmental information, a need to combat the threat by means of computer network operations and computer network defense have arisen. That protection is only one component of the military–digital complex and that the use of information warfare within the complex can be used to achieve military operations and an upper-hand in economic exploits.

The military–digital complex contains many components which align it succinctly to its industrial counterpart, for example the use of defense contractors. Although hired Contractors may not be explicitly named as such they still expose the complex to complications such as the principal–agent problem and consequently moral hazard. The MDC is seen as a progression as nations move globally towards cyberwarfare, indeed the cyber war is increasingly being acknowledged as the "fifth domain of warfare". The MDC is a necessity for governmental bodies in order to maintain high standards within their cyber army, for example the USA boasts over "143 private companies involved in top secret cyber operations programs", however James Gosler a government specialist in cyber security indicates that the USA have a severe shortage of government cybersecurity specialists.

== History ==
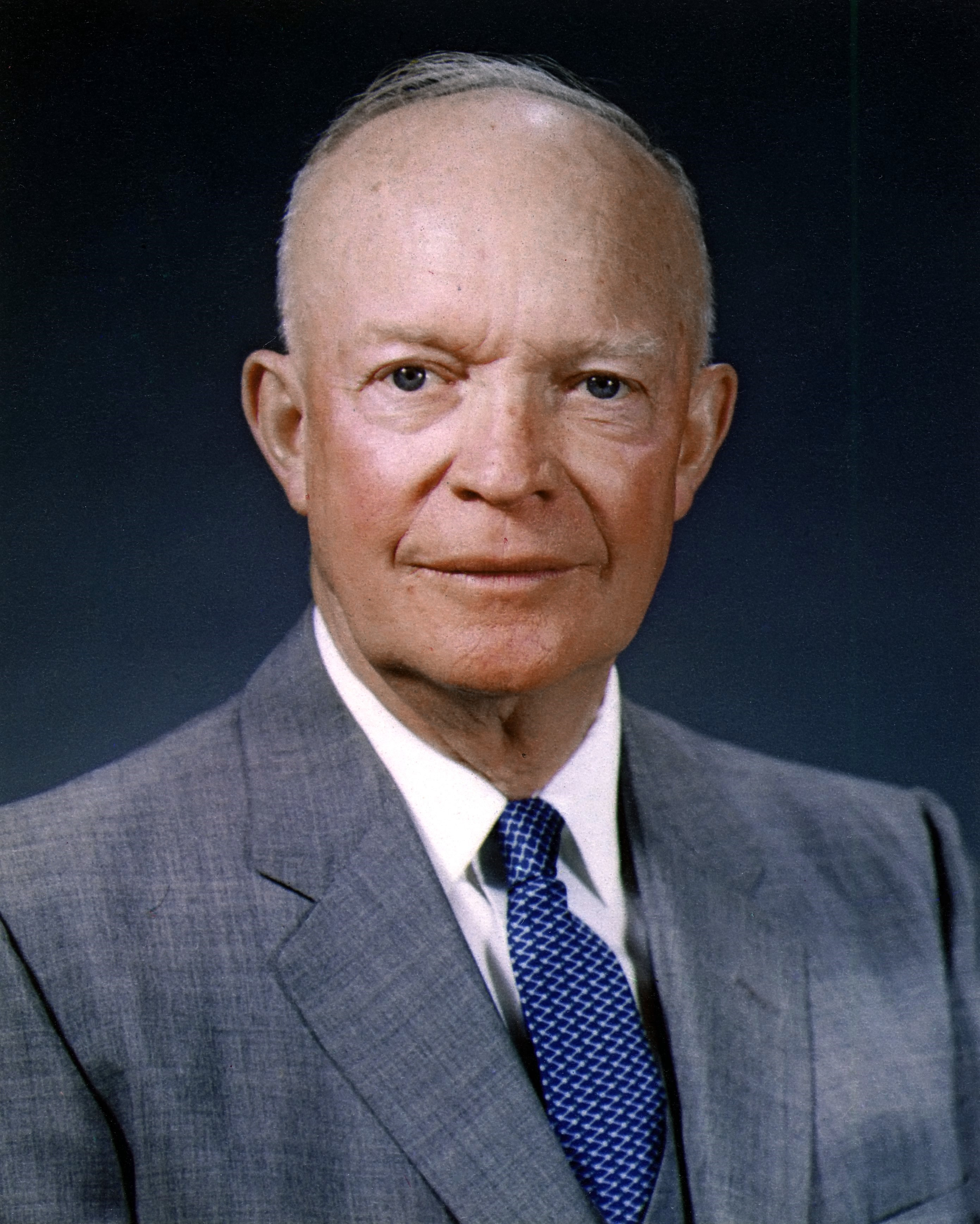
President Dwight D. Eisenhower famously coined the precursor phrase military–industrial complex when describing the twinning of the arms industry to the military under the government; this paved the way for the emergence of the military–digital complex.

It was not until the late 19th and early 20th century that weaponry advanced in leaps and bounds to the armaments mankind witnesses today, however even then industry was relatively independent of the government and military. World War I and World War II were two important factors that led to the consequent military–industrial complex. Eric Hobsbawm in his book Age of Extremes outlines how categorically countries like Japan, USA and Russia had to develop their own military industry to support their militaristic efforts, creating a complex whereby the economies then straddled on this arms industry. Consequently, the procurement of missiles, ballistics, nuclear weapons, destroyers and submarines shows a marked difference between the ancient acquisitions of countries.

At the dawn on the 21st century, the world has seen an emergence of digital equipment in the use of warfare, spanning from satellite surveillance systems all the way to dedicated agencies such as United States Cyber Command fully equipped with thousands of professionals manning computers on a 24/365 basis in order to prevent a cyber attack.

The use of computers has long been an essential tool in warfare, however as warfare moves from the traditional frontiers of land, sea, air and space to "cyber space" the use of computers is becoming not only essential but vital. Gregory Rattray, author of Strategic Warfare in Cyberspace, explains how the history of warfare in the Information Age is far reaching and is well beyond military operation including financial crime and economic espionage. The history of this cyber warfare shows that it crosses global boundaries and encompasses political agendas, attacks on the USA such as Titan Rain show an attack from networks and computers situated in China for example. As the age of digital warfare progressed it has become evident that human reliance on technological equipment to monitor essential utilities such as our electricity grids has proven cataclysmic. As the threat became increasingly relevant, the emergence of big corporate players on the MDC scene including names such as Symantec, McAfee and traditional defense contractors such as Northrop Grumman and Lockheed Martin, as the cyber threat grows so does mankind's reliance on corporate players such as the aforementioned, creating an iron triangle among government, military and these global security corporations.

== See also ==
- List of industrial complexes
- James Langevin#Cybersecurity
- Michael McCaul#Legislation
- Leidos
- Booz Allen Hamilton
