= Peace–industrial complex =

In political science, political economics, and peace and conflict studies, referring to the military–industrial complex, the peace–industrial complex defines the industry and economy derived from development, peacemaking, peacebuilding, and conflict resolution at both the domestic and foreign levels. While some scholars (Seiberling 1972) argue that the peace–industrial complex must oppose the military-industrial complex, others (Aberkane 2012) argue it is destined to become its natural, peaceful evolution, and further call it the "military-industrial complex 2.0". The latter argue the peace-industrial complex more precisely consists of turning military research and development into civilian technology as systematically as possible. Although it has been discussed in more recent times the concept was introduced as early as in 1969 by the U.S. Senate Committee on Government Operations.

== In relation to the War Against War ==
=== Origin of the Peace-industrial complex ===
At least two approaches to the War Against War may be distinguished, the frontal opposition to war or Anti-war movement on the one side and the transcendent, post-war conception of William James' 'Moral Equivalent of war' positing, in the way of the UNESCO, that the only way to end conflicts is to make Humanity busy with more fascinating endeavors than wars. In his Nobel acceptance speech Martin Luther King Jr. further underlined that idea which would become the basis of the transcendentist school (e.g. Aberkane):

We will not build a peaceful world by following a negative path. It is not enough to say "We must not wage war." It is necessary to love peace and sacrifice for it. We must concentrate not merely on the negative expulsion of war, but on the positive affirmation of peace. There is a fascinating little story that is preserved for us in Greek literature about Ulysses and the Sirens. The Sirens had the ability to sing so sweetly that sailors could not resist steering toward their island. Many ships were lured upon the rocks, and men forgot home, duty, and honor as they flung themselves into the sea to be embraced by arms that drew them down to death. Ulysses, determined not to be lured by the Sirens, first decided to tie himself tightly to the mast of his boat, and his crew stuffed their ears with wax. But finally he and his crew learned a better way to save themselves: they took on board the beautiful singer Orpheus whose melodies were sweeter than the music of the Sirens. When Orpheus sang, who bothered to listen to the Sirens?

Various scholars (Suter 1986, Aberkane 2012, Roberts 2009) and politicians (Seiberling 1972) have thus advocated that peace profiteering should simply be made palatably larger than any possible war profiteering, thus transcending the war against war. However, the first generations of Peace-Industrial scholars have advocated frontal opposition to the military-industrial complex rather than its transcendent, voluntary metamorphosis into a globally benevolent yet very profitable peace-industrial complex.

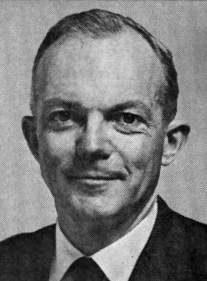
US. Rep. John F. Seiberling c. the time of his 1972 address to the Congress calling for a Peace-industrial complex

In 1986 Keith D. Suter defended his Ph.D dissertation on Creating the political will necessary for achieving multilateral disarmament : the need for a peace-industrial complex, which was further cited in 1995. The concept of a Peace–industrial complex had already been introduced as early as in 1969 in the U.S. Senate Committee on Government Operations. The original quote affirmed direct opposition to the military-industrial complex and was therefore not transcendent in nature: "It is time for the United States to break the Huge military-industrial complex and begin in its stead a people and peace-industrial complex". It received further citation throughout the 1970s. The notion appeared in the 'United States Congress House Committee on Science and Astronautics, Subcommittee on Science, Research, and Development' in 1972 in a congressional address by US Rep. J.F. Seiberling (1972)

Suter further defended that "each country create a national Ministry for Peace", which was contemporary to the creation of the Ministry for Peace Australia (MFPA) initiative and the Global Alliance for Ministries & Infrastructures for Peace (GAMIP). An Education for a Peace Industrial Complex conference (EPIC) is also mentioned in a 1984 issue of Nuclear Times magazine.

=== The Transcendentist school ===
If Kofi J. Roberts explicitly called for the substitution of a military-industrial complex by a peace industrial complex which would enable the focusing of federal spendings on construction rather than destruction, Idriss J. Aberkane further defended the transcendent approach to the peace-industrial complex by calling it the "military-industrial complex 2.0" and thus neither the enemy nor the political complement to the military industrial complex but rather its natural, inevitable evolution on the account that investors (either institutional or private) will inevitably realize the larger profitability of construction over destruction. Aberkane also advocates the political viability of a peace-industrial complex by declaring that in the 21st century, what he calls "weapons of mass construction" will grant much larger political leverage, leadership and soft power than weapons of mass destruction.

every time a military technology makes it to civilian use it changes the world for good and what it brings you is love rather than hatred, for if you project destruction you're gonna be hated, if you project construction, you're gonna be loved. So what is power, truly, what is a superpower? Is it a nation that has weapons of mass destruction? No it is not! Many nations have weapons of mass destruction they are not all superpowers (...) when you're looking at The Pentagon you're looking at a budget of 740 billion US dollars, that's the budget of the Department of Defense plus de discretionary budget that is allocated to Research and Development for defense. I'm not saying we should take it away from the Pentagon, I say we should move to the Pentagon 2.0. For so far, what has America gained in projecting every bits of these dollars? Every time America uses these dollars is it more loved? Is it more respected? Is it safer? Is it more trusted? Does it have more leadership? (...) America could project this money to gain love, respect, leadership and political power. This, is the military-industrial complex 2.0. [It] will be interested in weapons of mass construction rather than weapons of mass destruction because these weapons are the future in terms of power. For what was the power of the 20th century? In the 20th century power was the ability to go from a beautiful blue planet to a red one. If you could turn a blue planet into a red one you were powerful. We have the technology to do that, these (sic) are called weapons of mass destruction. Do we have the technology to go the other way around? Can we turn a red planet - Mars in that case - into a beautiful green planet? We can't but when you're looking at a budget of seven hundred billions US dollars you can look into that. This is gonna be 21st century power, weapons of mass construction. Why? because if you project these weapons I guarantee you people are gonna love you

== See also ==
- List of industrial complexes
