= Bureau of Motion Pictures =

U.S. government agency collaborating with Hollywood during WWII

- BMP

Agency overview
- Formed: 1942
- Dissolved: 1943
- Superseding agency: Office of Censorship
- Jurisdiction: United States Government
- Headquarters: Washington, D.C., United States
- Parent agency: United States Office of War Information

The Bureau of Motion Pictures (BMP) was a division of the United States Office of War Information (OWI) during World War II. Established in 1942, the BMP collaborated with Hollywood studios to produce films that supported American war objectives, fostering public morale and promoting national unity. It was dissolved in 1943, with its functions partially absorbed by the older Office of Censorship.

== History ==
The Bureau of Motion Pictures (BMP) was established during World War II, as part of the Office of War Information’s (OWI) broader efforts to use mass media to influence public opinion and mobilize civilian support for the war effort. Hollywood was identified as a powerful medium to disseminate messages of patriotism, sacrifice, and the importance of the war effort. The BMP, headquartered in Washington, D.C., operated under the jurisdiction of the U.S. government.

The BMP’s approach was influenced by earlier U.S. government efforts to use film as a propaganda tool. A notable predecessor was the Division of Films, a branch of the Committee on Public Information (CPI) during World War I. The Division of Films directly produced official war pictures such as Under Four Flags (1918), which emphasized Allied cooperation and bolstered public support for the war.

Unlike the Division of Films, which focused on direct content production, the BMP worked closely with Hollywood studios by reviewing scripts and offering guidance rather than creating films in-house.

In 1941, the BMP's head was Howell Mellett, an aide to Roosevelt.

== Activities ==
The BMP collaborated with Hollywood studios by reviewing scripts and advising filmmakers on ways to incorporate themes that aligned with wartime goals. One of its key initiatives was the publication of the Government Information Manual for the Motion Picture. This guide instructed studios to focus on themes such as sacrifice, unity, and the moral superiority of the Allied forces. It also emphasized the need to portray America's enemies negatively and to highlight the strength and cooperation of the Allies.

Through its efforts, the BMP contributed to the production of films that supported the war effort, promoted the purchase of war bonds, and encouraged rationing and other civilian sacrifices.

== Decline ==
Despite its efforts, the BMP faced significant resistance from Hollywood filmmakers, who were wary of government interference and censorship. The tension between creative freedom and propaganda objectives led to conflicts that limited the BMP's effectiveness. Additionally, debates within the OWI over the Bureau's role and priorities, as well as a certain lack of support from the President and Congress of the United States, further undermined its mission.

In 1943, the Bureau of Motion Pictures was dissolved, and its responsibilities for monitoring film content were absorbed by the Office of Censorship, which focused primarily on preventing the release of sensitive information in media.

== See also ==
- Military-entertainment complex
