= Military–industrial–media complex =

Use of media resources to promote militarism

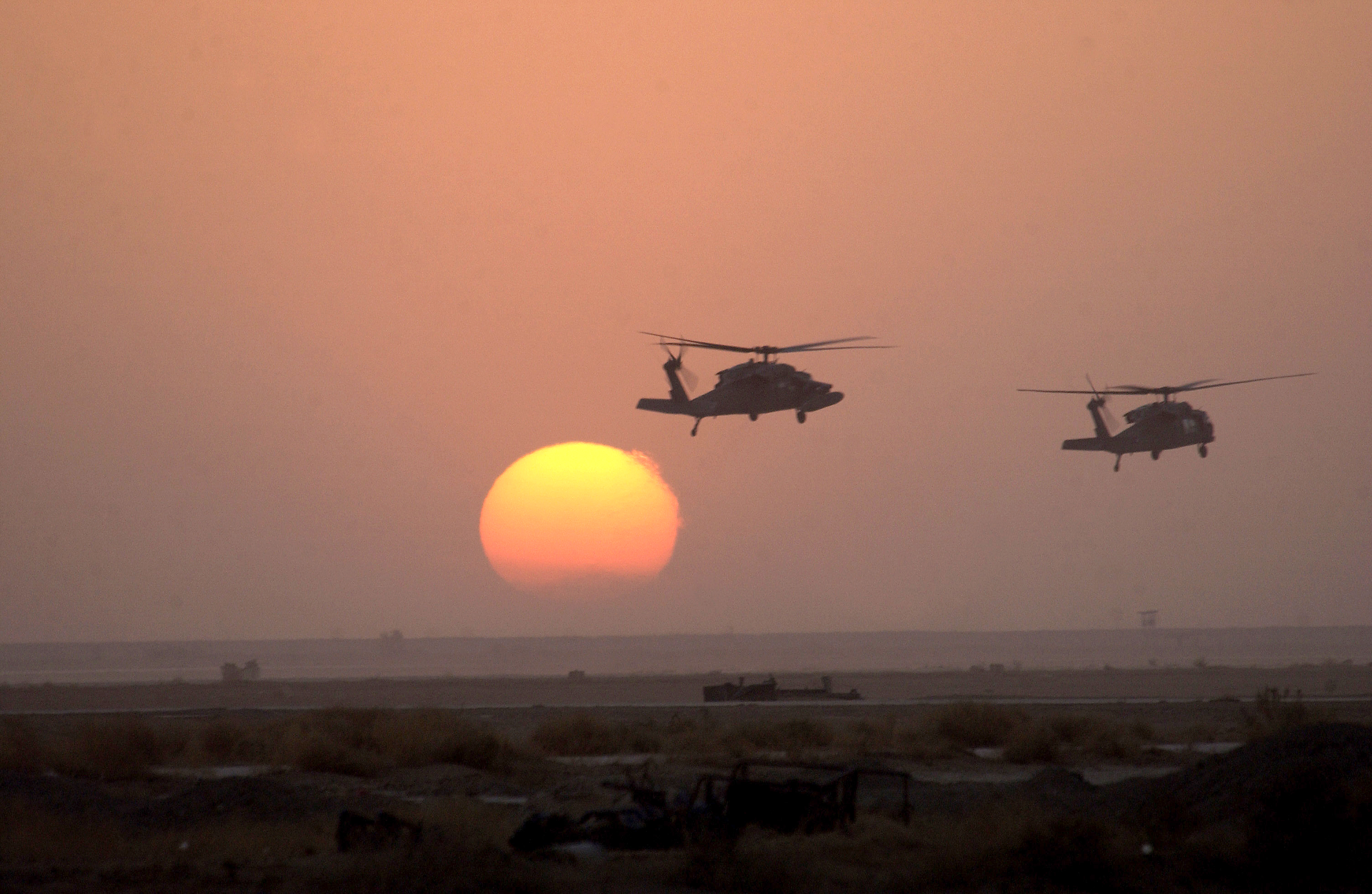
US Army HH-60 Blackhawk helicopters fly past the setting sun on April 2, 2003, at a forward-deployed location in southern Iraq during Operation Iraqi Freedom.

The military–industrial–media complex is an offshoot of the military–industrial complex. Organizations like Fairness and Accuracy in Reporting have accused the military industrial media complex of using their media resources to promote militarism, which, according to Fairness and Accuracy in Reporting's hypothesis, benefits the defense resources of the company and allows for a controlled narrative of armed conflicts. In this way, media coverage can be manipulated to show increased effectiveness of weapons systems and to avoid covering civilian casualties, or reducing the emphasis on them. Examples of such coverage include that of the Persian Gulf War, NATO bombing of Yugoslavia and the Iraq War.

It is a common practice by defense contractors and weapons systems manufacturers to hire former military personnel as media spokespersons. In 2008, The New York Times found that approximately 75 military analysts – many with military industry ties – were being investigated by the Government Accountability Office and other federal organizations for taking part in a years-long campaign to influence them into becoming "surrogates" for the Bush administration's military policy in the media.

== Gulf War ==
During the Gulf War General Electric owned NBC while being a subcontractor for the Tomahawk cruise missile and Patriot II missile, both of which were used extensively during the Persian Gulf War. General Electric also manufactures components for the B-2 stealth bomber and B-52 bomber and the E-3 AWACS aircraft which were also used extensively during the conflict. During the first Gulf War, General Electric received $2 billion in defense contracts related to weapons which would be used in Gulf War and the 2003 invasion and subsequent occupation of Iraq by Coalition Forces. As FAIR observed, "when correspondents and paid consultants on NBC television praised the performance of U.S. weapons, they were extolling equipment made by GE, the corporation that pays their salaries." Directly echoing official talking points, many media officials referred to civilian casualties as "collateral damage", and like many military officials tried to avoid talking about the existence of civilian casualties altogether. Media sources also completely omitted major events. NBC failed to mention 2000 bombing runs in Iraq in one night during the war, going as far to say that "it's a quiet night in the middle east". Hodding Carter III said that the American government should be "paying for the press coverage it was getting right now". Chris Hedges, an American journalist who reported on the Gulf War for The New York Times, remarked that media was "as eager to be of service to the state during the war as most everyone else".

== NATO bombing of Yugoslavia ==
During the NATO bombing of Yugoslavia, media coverage specifically avoided mentioning civilian casualties, even when mentioning the bombing of civilian targets such as infrastructure. Media coverage relied extensively on official NATO government and military sources for reporting, and repeatedly talked about current and future weaponry of NATO in favorable and expectant terms. Examples of weaponry include the Boeing AH-64 Apache attack helicopter, the Northrop Grumman B-2 Spirit and the Lockheed F-117 Nighthawk.

== Iraq War ==
Media-military coordination was such that media executives met in the Pentagon with military officials to decide what to cover and how. In 2007, a company named Defense Solutions hired former four-star general and NBC analyst Barry McCaffrey to petition David Petraeus to buy 5,000 armored vehicles from Defense Solutions. Subsequently, McCaffrey appeared on CNBC and praised Petraeus. The next month he encouraged congress in public testimony to purchase more armored vehicles, and criticized a plan that would see the purchase of vehicles from a competitor of Defense Solutions. Additionally, media sources failed to disclose how war industries sold weapons to Saddam Hussein during the 1980s when they covered the history of Iraq and the war crimes it had committed - often with American weapons.

== See also ==
- List of industrial complexes
- Blue Sky Tribe
- Iron triangle
- Pentagon military analyst program
- Propaganda model
