= Melissa Anderson =

Melissa Anderson may refer to:

- Cheerleader Melissa (born 1982), professional wrestler
- Melissa Sue Anderson (born 1962), American actress
- Melissa Anderson (Days of our Lives), a fictional character in the U.S. TV soap opera Days of our Lives
