= Light Industry =

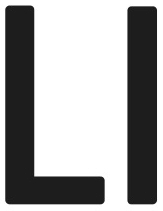
- Address: 361 Stagg Street, Suite 407; Brooklyn, New York; United States
- Coordinates: 40°42′39″N 73°56′3″W
- Type: Microcinema
- Opened: 2008

Website
- www.lightindustry.org

Light Industry is an American microcinema founded by Ed Halter and Thomas Beard. Since 2008 it has operated in several locations around Brooklyn, New York. Its programming focuses on obscure and unusual works.

== History ==
Halter and Beard met through the New York Underground Film Festival, which Halter ran. They started Light Industry in 2008, inspired by Amos Vogel who ran the Cinema 16 film society and co-founded the New York Film Festival. After opening in Industry City, they moved to a storefront in Downtown Brooklyn and later offered itinerant programming at other venues such as Anthology Film Archives and ISSUE Project Room.

Light Industry found a new permanent location in Greenpoint in 2011. The space had a simple design, with folding chairs and a small projection screen. They eventually built a wooden projection booth named after director Chantal Akerman, who had previously criticized the layout when presenting a film by Michael Snow. Halter and Beard co-curated film and video programs for the 2012 Whitney Biennial.

In 2017 Light Industry partnered with Anthology Film Archives to republish Stan Brakhage's Metaphors on Vision, with annotations by P. Adams Sitney. In 2020 they republished Michael Snow's 1975 artist's book Cover to Cover with Primary Information. Beard turned the back room into Monday Night Books, a pop-up store for secondhand books.

During the COVID-19 pandemic, Light Industry established the Cinema Worker Solidarity Fund with Screen Slate to provide financial assistance for local theater workers. It had its final show at the Greenpoint location in April 2023, before reopening shortly after in Williamsburg.

== Programming ==
A scene from a collaborative show in 2008, where participants recreated Plan 9 from Outer Space

Light Industry generally holds one screening each week, specializing in obscure and unusual works. Its programming draws from many artistic scenes that may otherwise have distinct audiences, such as avant-garde film, underground film, international art film, video art, and new media. Light Industry has often programmed works of queer cinema, which Halter described as understanding "the inestimable value of spaces that allow like-minded people to come together for a shared experience, a shared understanding."
