= From Sun Tzu to Xbox =

Book by Ed Halter

From Sun Tzu to Xbox: War and Video Games
- Author: Ed Halter
- Language: English
- Publisher: PublicAffairs
- Publication date: 31 May 2006
- ISBN: 978-1560256816
- Website: www.fromsuntzutoxbox.com

From Sun Tzu to Xbox: War and Video Games is a book of video game history written by the journalist and film critic Ed Halter, published in 2006.

== Description ==
The book describes the evolution of video games from military-related technologies and contemporary video game related projects by the American military such as America's Army and Full Spectrum Warrior. The book also relates pre-video game relationship between war and games, such as the evolution of chess into kriegspiel.

== Reviews ==
David Fear of the magazine Time Out found that Ed Halter provided a thorough analysis of the topic, but also attached some personal point of views to the story, which sometimes makes it off-topic. Avi Klein of Washington Monthly called the book an interesting if unfocused survey and praised its historical discussion. The review by Klein also noted numerous spelling and punctuation errors. Bernard Dy from Historynet found the book’s history of war-gaming and its discussion of the social links between gaming and war compelling.

== Quotes ==
The technologies that shape our culture have always been pushed forward by war.

Video games were not created directly for military purposes, [they] arose out of an intellectual environment whose existence was entirely predicated on defense research.

A more realistic form of America's Army, for example, would be one in which your soldier might lose a limb or get brain-damaged in combat, then come home to a Sims-style scenario in which you have to manage the rest of your life that way. Or maybe a game where you don't get into combat at all–you just camp out in the desert, running exercises.

== See also ==
- List of books on computer and video games
- Military–entertainment complex
