= Ed Halter =

- Occupations: curator, writer

Ed Halter is an American writer, critic, and film programmer, and founder of Light Industry, a microcinema in Brooklyn, New York. He currently teaches at Bard College, where he is Critic in Residence.

== Criticism ==
His writing has been featured in 4Columns, Artforum, The Believer, Bookforum, Cinema Scope, frieze, Little Joe, Mousse, The New Yorker, the The New York Review of Books, Rhizome, Triple Canopy, and Village Voice as well as the Criterion Collection. Halter is interested in the intersection of video games, digital media, and American experimental film.

== Books ==
His first book From Sun Tzu to Xbox was released in 2006. He has edited the compilation Mass Effect: Art and the Internet in the Twenty First Century (2015), with Lauren Cornell. His edited volume From The Third Eye: The Evergreen Review Film Reader was published by Seven Stories Press in 2018; it is a compilation of essays from Evergreen Review which were published from 1950-1970. In 2026, Inpatient Press announced Lives of Eminent Sorcerers: And Other Readings, Halter's first work of fiction, an encyclopedia-structured collection of stories set in an alternate world. The book is distributed by MIT Press and is scheduled for publication in late 2026.

== Film programming ==
Halter programmed and oversaw the New York Underground Film Festival from 1995 to 2005. With Thomas Beard, in 2008 he founded Light Industry. Light Industry is an exhibition space for experimental film currently housed in East Williamsburg, Brooklyn, Brooklyn, after many years in nearby Greenpoint, Brooklyn. Light Industry has the goal of creating a space for the curation and cultivation of a thriving, but fragmented art scene. Also with Beard and curators Elisabeth Sussman and Jay Sanders, he co-curated the film program for the 2012 Whitney Biennial.

== Awards ==
In 2017, Halter was awarded the Carl & Marlynn Thoma Art Foundation's Arts Writing Awards in Digital Art as an emerging writer.
