= Mini theater =

Type of independent movie theater

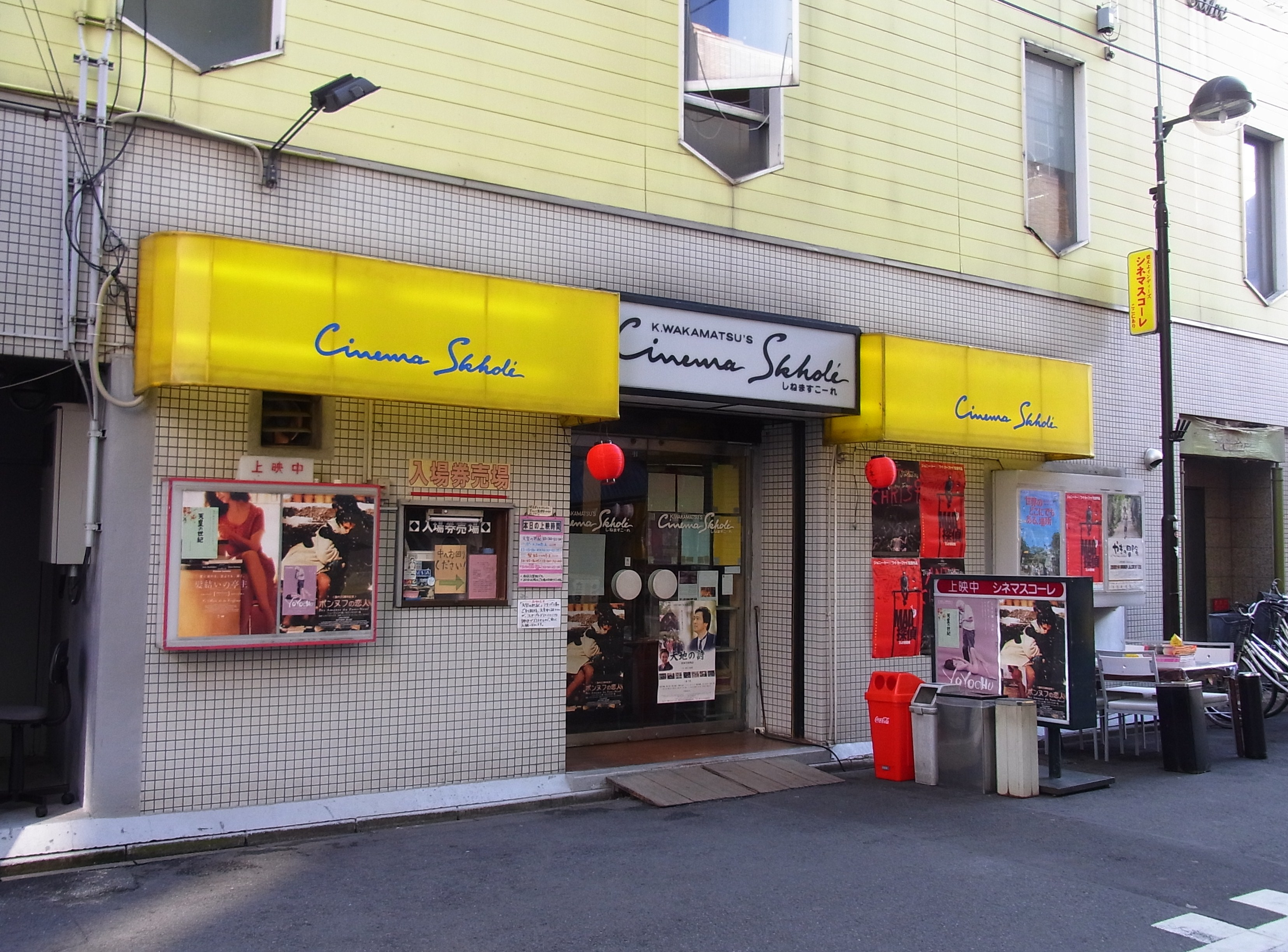
Cinema Skhole, a mini theater in Nagoya, Japan

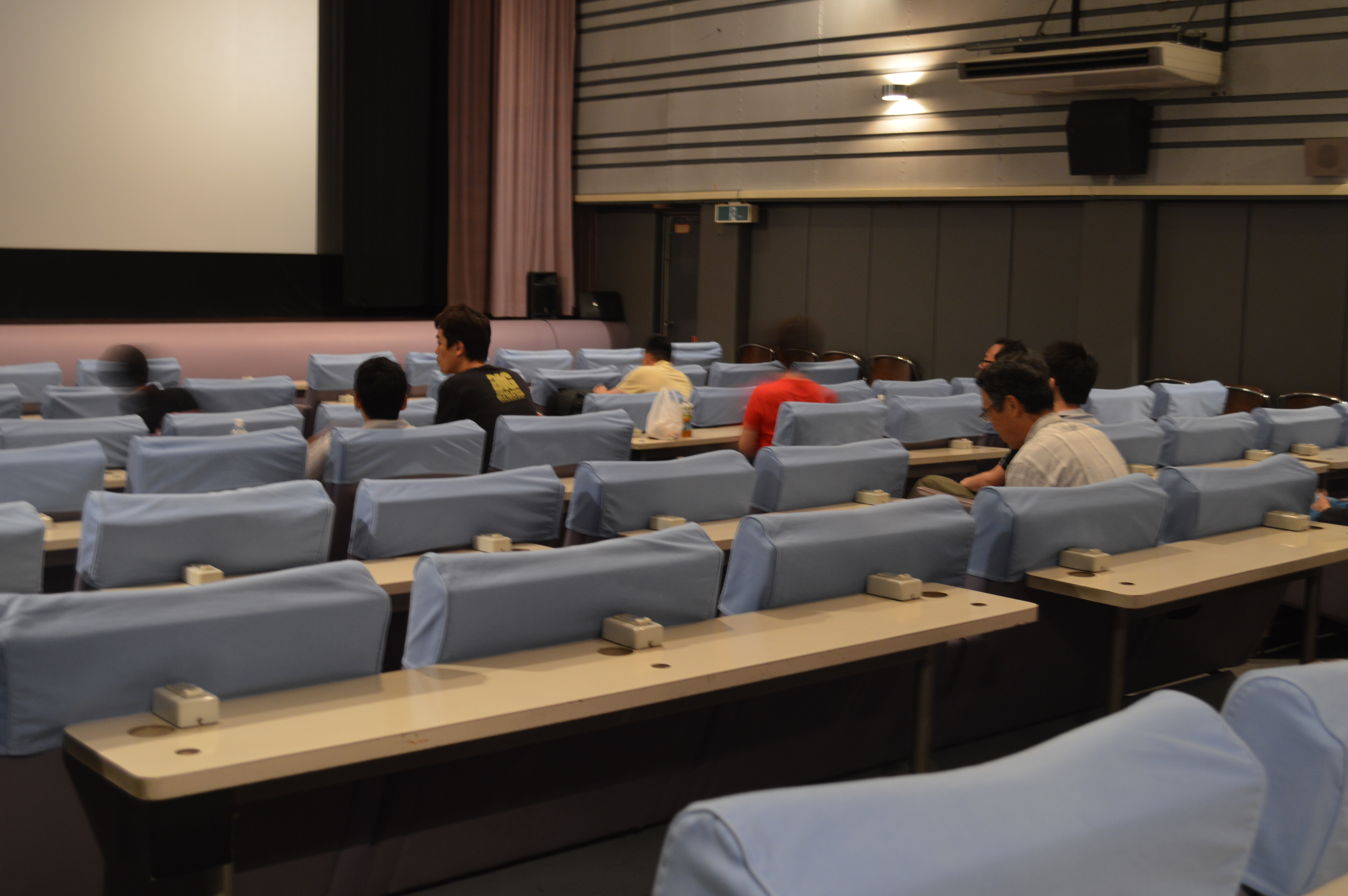
The auditorium of a mini theater in Hiroshima

A mini theater (Japanese: ミニシアター, Hepburn: mini shiatā), mini cineplex (Bengali: মিনি সিনেপ্লেক্স), or microcinema is a type of independent movie theater that is not under the direct influence of any major film companies. Mini theaters are characterized by their relatively smaller size and seating capacity compared to larger, non-independent movie theaters, as well as their programming, which typically includes independent or arthouse films.

Mini theaters can be found worldwide, and are particularly known in Japan, where they have existed since the 1970s.

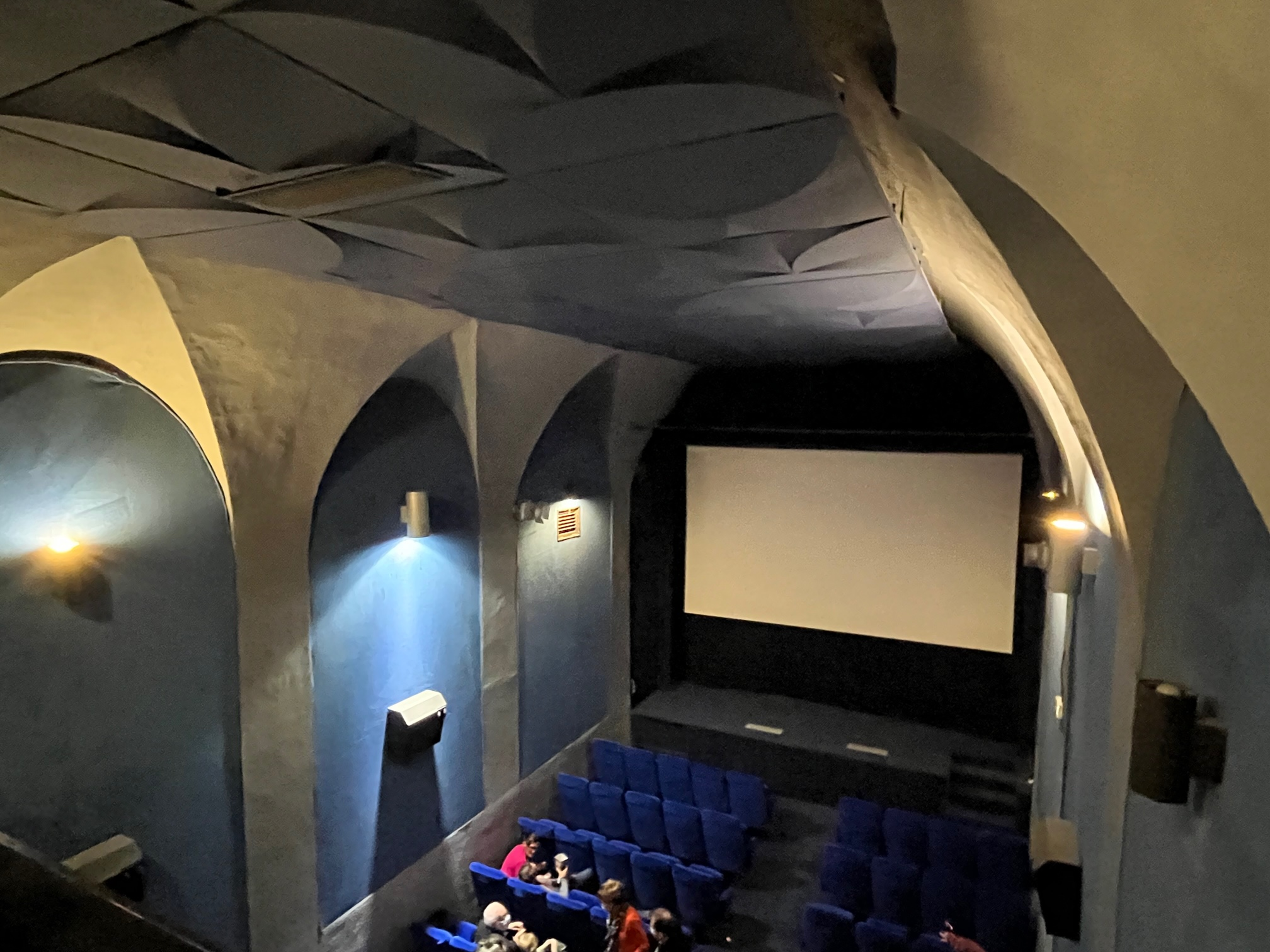
Le Studio, a micro-cinema in Bastia, Corsica.

== History ==
=== In Japan ===
==== Origins and rise in popularity ====
In 1974, a film distribution project known as Equipe de Cinema was instituted at Iwanami Hall, a venue constructed by Iwanami Shoten, in Tokyo, Japan. Iwanami Hall, which was originally used as a multipurpose hall, became one of the first mini theaters, able to seat 220 people. The project was headed by Etsuko Tanakno, general manager of Iwanami Hall, and film producer Kashiko Kawakita, who sought to screen films deemed inappropriate for wide distribution.

Mini theaters were popularized throughout Japan in the 1980s. During that decade, mini theaters often screened European independent and arthouse films, such as films produced during the French New Wave, as well as films originating from Hungary, Poland and Bulgaria. Mini theaters also screened independent films produced in Japan by relatively unknown Japanese filmmakers. The popularity of mini theaters continued into the 1990s, and some mini-theater operators, such as Theatre Shinjuku and Eurospace, began investing in film production.

==== In the 21st century ====
Several mini theaters in the Tokyo metropolitan area were closed during the late 20th and early 21st centuries. Mini theater Cine Vivant ceased operations in 1999, and Cine Saison and Ginza Theatre Cinema closed in 2011 and 2013, respectively. On April 7, 2020, the COVID-19 pandemic prompted the Japanese government to declare a state of emergency for Tokyo and six other prefectures, resulting in the closure of movie theaters nationwide. Consequently, mini theaters have suffered significant drops in revenue.

In response to the negative financial impact of the pandemic on mini theaters, Japanese filmmakers organized movements to help support them. Directors Kōji Fukada and Ryūsuke Hamaguchi launched a crowdfunding campaign to assist mini theaters; the campaign amassed over 100 million yen in donations in three days.

=== In Bangladesh ===
In Bangladesh, there are several mini theaters and micro theaters. The first mini single screen movie theater is Momo Inn Cinema, which is situated in Momo Inn Hotel and Resort, Nawdapara, Bogura. It was established in 2018 as a part of the resort. Though this cinema was established with only 40 seats, but now, Momo Inn theater has 108 seats. The first mini cineplex of the country was established in July, 2018 in Nasirabad, Chittagong, named Silver Screen. This mini multiplex had 95 seat capacity combining two screens, Platinum, a mini theater and Titanium, a micro theater. In 2025, Silver Screen has been shut down for business loss, later which was acquired and became the 9th branch of Star Cineplex cinema chain. The first micro single screen movie theater is CineScope, which was established in September 20, 2019, in Narayanganj. This government-sponsored micro cinema has only 35 seats.

=== In the Philippines ===
In June 2021, a microcinema and café known as the Cinema '76 Café opened in Quezon City.

=== In the United Kingdom ===
In September 2020, the Chinese consumer electronics manufacturer Oppo Mobile opened a pop-up microcinema in the South Bank of London, England.

=== In the United States ===
The term "microcinema" was coined in 1994 by Rebecca Barten and David Sherman, operators of the Total Mobile Home MicroCINEMA in San Francisco, and was subsequently used to describe a global movement of new, DIY-style small cinemas. Notable American microcinemas include Spectacle Theater, Light Industry, UnionDocs, and the Luminal Theater in New York as well as Other Cinema and the Acropolis Cinema in California.

In Charlotte, North Carolina, the video rental store VisArt Video has a microcinema that can be rented for private screenings. In October 2022, the 38-seat Screen Door Microcinema opened in Ybor City, Tampa, Florida, as the first official microcinema in Tampa. In March 2022, Tallgrass Film Association launched their microcinema in downtown Wichita, Kansas.

== See also ==
- Movie palace
- Multiplex (movie theater)
