= 2014 New York Film Festival =

52nd edition

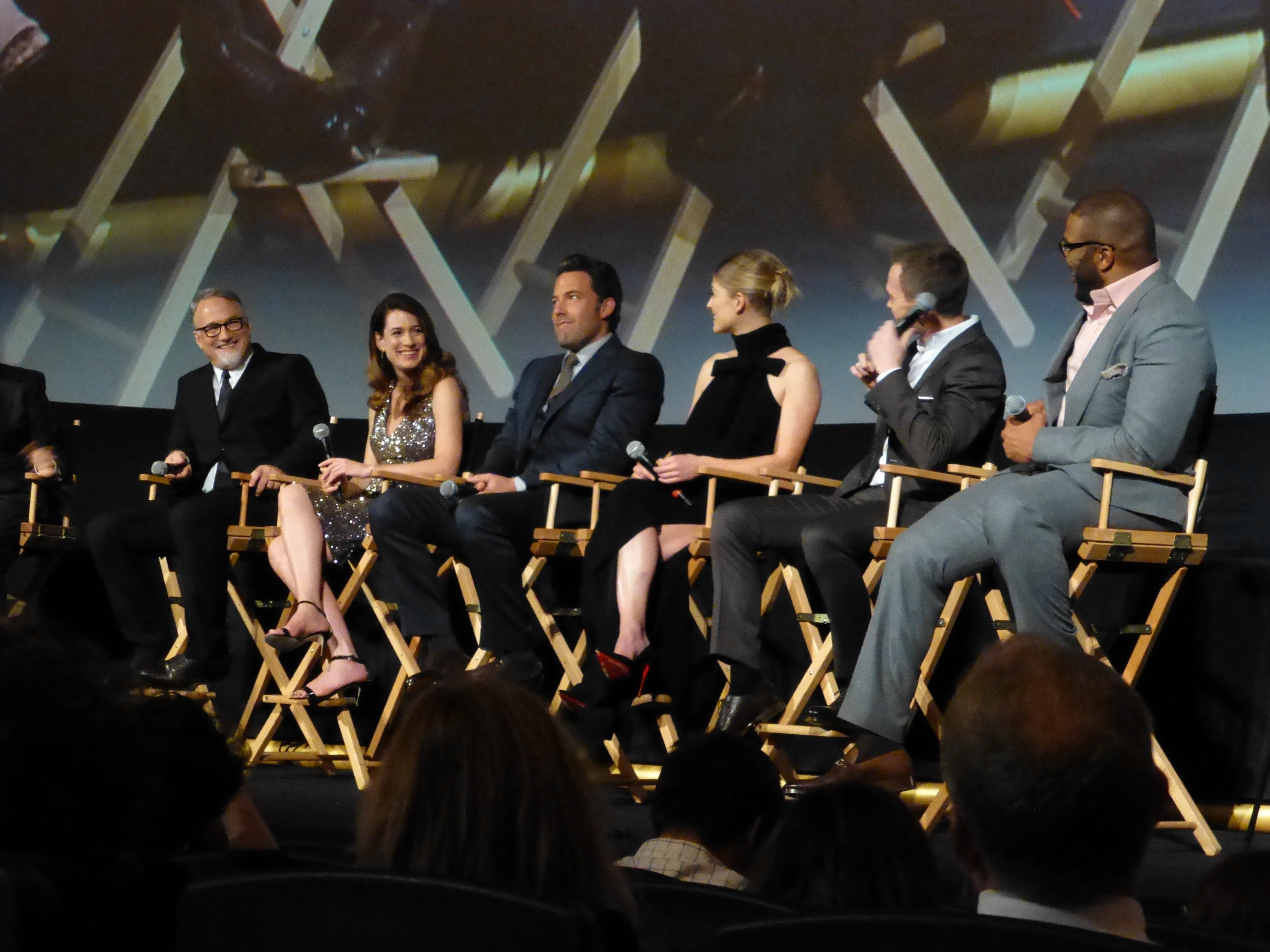
- Gone Girl Premiere at the 52nd New York Film Festival
- Opening film: Gone Girl
- Closing film: Birdman
- Location: New York City, United States
- Founded: 1963
- Founded by: Richard Roud and Amos Vogel
- Hosted by: Film at Lincoln Center
- Artistic director: Kent Jones
- Festival date: September 26 – October 12, 2014
- Website: https://www.filmlinc.org/nyff/

New York Film Festival
- 2015 2013

The 52nd New York Film Festival took place from September 26 to October 12, 2014, in New York City, presented by Film at Lincoln Center.

The festival's opening film was David Fincher's Gone Girl. Paul Thomas Anderson's Inherent Vice was the festival's centerpiece. While Alejandro González Iñárritu's Birdman was the festival's closing film.

Appearing in NYFF's "Main Slate" for the first time were: Abderrahmane Sissako, Alex Ross Perry, Asia Argento, Benny and Josh Safdie, Damien Chazelle, Laura Poitras, Lisandro Alonso, Matías Piñeiro, Mia Hansen-Løve, and Yann Demange.

== Official Selections ==
The primary selection committee included Kent Jones (chair), Dennis Lim, Marian Masone, Gavin Smith, and Amy Taubin.

=== Main Slate ===
The following films were selected:

English Title	Original Title	Director(s)	Production Country
Beloved Sisters	Die geliebten Schwestern	Dominik Graf	Germany
Birdman (closing film)		Alejandro González Iñárritu	United States
The Blue Room	La chambre bleue	Mathieu Amalric	France
Citizenfour		Laura Poitras	United States, Germany
Clouds of Sils Maria	Sils Maria	Olivier Assayas	Germany, France, Switzerland
Eden		Mia Hansen-Løve	France
Foxcatcher		Bennett Miller	United States
Gone Girl (opening film)		David Fincher	United States
Goodbye to Language	Adieu au langage	Jean-Luc Godard	France, Switzerland
Heaven Knows What		Benny and Josh Safdie	United States
Hill of Freedom	자유의 언덕	Hong Sang-soo	South Korea
Horse Money	Cavalo Dinheiro	Pedro Costa	Portugal
Inherent Vice (centerpiece)		Paul Thomas Anderson	United States
Jauja		Lisandro Alonso	Denmark, United States, Argentina
Life of Riley	Aimer, boire et chanter	Alain Resnais	France
Listen Up Philip		Alex Ross Perry	United States
Maps to the Stars		David Cronenberg	Canada, United States
Misunderstood	Incompresa	Asia Argento	Italy, France
Mr. Turner		Mike Leigh	United Kingdom
Pasolini		Abel Ferrara	France, Italy, Belgium
The Princess of France	La Princesa de Francia	Matías Piñeiro	Argentina
Saint Laurent		Bertrand Bonello	France
La Sapienza		Eugène Green	France, Italy
'71		Yann Demange	United Kingdom
Tales of the Grim Sleeper		Nick Broomfield	United States, United Kingdom
Timbuktu		Abderrahmane Sissako	France, Mauritania
Time Out of Mind		Oren Moverman	United States
Two Days, One Night	Deux jours, une nuit	Jean-Pierre and Luc Dardenne	Belgium, Italy, France
Two Shots Fired	Dos Disparos	Martín Rejtman	Argentina
Whiplash		Damien Chazelle	United States
The Wonders	Le meraviglie	Alice Rohrwacher	Italy, Switzerland, Germany

=== Special Events ===
The following films were selected:

English Title	Original Title	Director(s)	Production Country
The Forest	La Forêt	Arnaud Desplechin	France
The King and the Mockingbird (1952/1980)	Le Roi et l'oiseau	Paul Grimault	France
P'tit Quinquin		Bruno Dumont	France
Queen and Country		John Boorman	United Kingdom
This Is Spinal Tap (1984)		Rob Reiner	United States
Voilà l’enchaînement (short)		Claire Denis	France

=== Spotlight on Documentary ===
The following films were selected:

English Title	Original Title	Director(s)	Production Country
The 50 Year Argument		Martin Scorsese and David Tedeschi	United Kingdom, Japan, United States
Dreams Are Colder Than Death		Arthur Jafa	United States
How to Smell a Rose: A Visit with Ricky Leacock in Normandy		Les Blank and Gina Leibrecht	United States, France
Iris		Albert Maysles	United States
The Iron Ministry		J. P. Sniadecki	United States, China
The Look of Silence	Senyap	Joshua Oppenheimer	Denmark, Finland, France, Germany, Indonesia, Israel, Netherlands, Norway, United Kingdom, United States
Merchants of Doubt		Robert Kenner	United States
National Gallery		Frederick Wiseman	United States, France
Non-Fiction Diary	논픽션 다이어리	Jung Yoon-suk	South Korea
One Cut, One Life		Ed Pincus and Lucia Small	United States
Red Army		Gabe Polsky	United States
Seymour: An Introduction		Ethan Hawke	United States
Silvered Water, Syria Self-Portrait	ماء الفضة	Ossama Mohammed and Wiam Simav Bedirxan	Syria, France
Stray Dog		Debra Granik	United States
Sunshine Superman		Marah Strauch	United States, Norway, United Kingdom

=== Shorts Programs ===
The following short films were selected:

English Title	Original Title	Director(s)	Production Country
Program 1
The Girl and the Dogs		Selma Vilhunen and Guillaume Mainguet	Denmark, Finland, France
Humor		Tal Zagreba	Israel
In August	En Août	Jenna Hasse	Switzerland
Ophelia		Sergei Rostropovich	Germany
A Paradise	Un Paraíso	Jayisha Patel	Cuba
Young Lions of Gypsy	A Ciambra	Jonas Carpignano	France, Italy
Wu Gui		Jordan Schiele	China, Singapore, United States
Program 2
Chlorine	Cloro	Marcelo Grabowsky	Brazil
Crooked Candy		Andrew Rodgers	United States
La Estancia		Federico Adorno	Paraguay
Hepburn		Tommy Davis	United States
The Kármán Line		Oscar Sharp	United Kingdom
The Return	Le Retour	Yohann Kouam	France

=== Projections ===
Following the departure of programmer Mark McElhatten, the experimental section was renamed from "Views from the Avant-Garde" to "Projections". Projections was programmed by Dennis Lim, Aily Nash, and Gavin Smith. The following films were selected:

Title	Director(s)	Production Country
Program 1
Against Landscape	Joshua Gen Solondz	United States
Babash	Lisa Truttmann and Behrouz Rae	United States, Austria, Iran
Canopy	Ken Jacobs	United States
Night Noon	Shambhavi Kaul	Mexico, United States
Old Growth	Ryan Marino	United States
Theoretical Architectures	Josh Gibson	United States
Under the Heat Lamp an Opening	Zachary Epcar	United States
Wayward Fronds	Fern Silva	United States
Program 2
Ming of Harlem: Twenty One Storeys in the Air	Phillip Warnell	United Kingdom, Belgium, United States
Program 3
Berlin or a Dream with Cream (Berlin oder ein Traum mit Sahne) (1974)	Marcel Broodthaers	Germany
a certain worry	Jonathan Schwartz	United States
Depositions	Luke Fowler	United Kingdom
The Dragon Is the Frame	Mary Helena Clark	United States
Mr. Teste et La Lune (1970-1974)	Marcel Broodthaers	Belgium
Things	Ben Rivers	United Kingdom
Program 4
Fe26	Kevin Jerome Everson	United States
The Measures	Jacqueline Goss and Jenny Perlin	United States, France
Second Sighted	Deborah Stratman	United States
Sound That	Kevin Jerome Everson	United States
Program 5
Sauerbruch Hutton Architects	Harun Farocki	Germany
Program 6
Color Neutral	Jennifer Reeves	United States
End Reel	Julie Murray	United States
Hat Trick	Katherin McInnis	United States
Picture Particles	Thorsten Fleisch	Germany
Off-White Tulips	Aykan Safoğlu	Turkey, Germany
Sleeping District	Tinne Zenner	Denmark, Russia
Zinoviev's Tube: Tape 2 of the Inner Trotsky Child series	Jim Finn	United States
Program 7
Atlantis	Ben Russell	Malta, United States
The Figures Carved into the Knife by the Sap of the Banana Trees	Joana Pimenta	United States, Portugal
Under the Atmosphere	Mike Stoltz	United States
Shwebonta	Meredith Lackey	United States
Program 8
Letters to Max	Eric Baudelaire	France
Program 9
Darkroom	Billy Roisz	Austria
Detour de Force	Rebecca Baron	United States, Austria
Field Notes	Vashti Harrison	United States
Red Capriccio	Blake Williams	Canada
Sea of Vapors	Sylvia Schedelbauer	Germany
Program 10
2012	Takashi Makino	Japan
Blanket Statement #2: It's All or Nothing	Jodie Mack	United States
Blue Loop, July	Mike Gibisser	United States
Friday Mosque	Azadeh Navai	United States
The Hummingbird Wars	Janie Geiser	United States
Ginza Strip	Richard Tuohy	Australia, Japan
Light Year	Paul Clipson	United States
Razzle Dazzle	Jodie Mack	United States
Sound of a Million Insects, Light of a Thousand Stars	Tomonari Nishikawa	Japan
Program 11
El Futuro	Luis Lopez Carrasco	Spain
The Occidental Hotel	Lewis Klahr	United States
Program 12
Adorno's Grey	Hito Steyerl	Germany
Broken Tongue	Mónica Savirón	United States
Chapters 1, 2 & 3 ‘from the impossibility of one page being like the other’	Oraib Toukan, Ala Younis	Jordan
Film	Ismaïl Bahri	France, Tunisia
The Innocents	Jean-Paul Kelly	Canada
O, Persecuted	Basma Alsharif	United Kingdom, Palestine
Sugarcoated Arsenic	Claudrena Harold, Kevin Jerome Everson	United States
Program 13
Horizon	Stephanie Barber	United States
How to Make Money Religiously	Laure Prouvost	United Kingdom
Lorem ipsum 1	Victoria Fu	United States
Pan	Anton Ginzburg	United States
Renaissance Center/GM Tower	Nicky Hamlyn	Canada, United Kingdom
Seven Signs that Mean Silence	Sara Magenheimer	United States
SONE S/S 2014: Chase ATM emitting blue smoke, Bank of America ATM emitting red smoke, TD Bank ATM emitting green smoke /// Invisibility-cloaked hand gestures in offshore financial center jungle	Andrew Norman Wilson	United States
Sound of My Soul	Wojciech Bąkowski	Poland

=== Revivals ===
The following films were selected:

English Title	Original Title	Director(s)	Production Country
Burroughs (1983)		Howard Brookner	United States, United Kingdom
The Color of Pomegranates (1969)	Նռան գույնը	Sergei Parajanov	Soviet Union
Hiroshima mon amour (1959)		Alain Resnais	France, Japan
Jamaica Inn (1939)		Alfred Hitchcock	United Kingdom
The Man from Laramie (1955)		Anthony Mann	United States
Moana with Sound (1926-1980)		Robert J. Flaherty, Frances H. Flaherty and Monica Flaherty Frassetto	United States
A Night of Storytelling (1934)	Oidhche Sheanchais	Robert Flaherty	Ireland
Once Upon a Time in America (1984)	C'era una volta in America	Sergio Leone	Italy, United States
The Tales of Hoffmann (1951)		Michael Powell and Emeric Pressburger	United Kingdom

=== Retrospective ===
The following films were selected:

Title	Director(s)	Production Country
5 Fingers (1952)	Joseph L. Mankiewicz	United States
All About Eve (1950)	Joseph L. Mankiewicz	United States
The Barefoot Contessa (1954)	Joseph L. Mankiewicz	United States
A Carol for Another Christmas (1964)	Joseph L. Mankiewicz	United States
Cleopatra (1963)	Joseph L. Mankiewicz	United States
Dragonwyck (1946)	Joseph L. Mankiewicz	United States
Escape (1948)	Joseph L. Mankiewicz	United States
The Ghost and Mrs. Muir (1947)	Joseph L. Mankiewicz	United States
Guys and Dolls (1955)	Joseph L. Mankiewicz	United States
The Honey Pot (1967)	Joseph L. Mankiewicz	United States
House of Strangers (1949)	Joseph L. Mankiewicz	United States
Julius Caesar (1953)	Joseph L. Mankiewicz	United States
The Late George Apley (1947)	Joseph L. Mankiewicz	United States
A Letter to Three Wives (1949)	Joseph L. Mankiewicz	United States
No Way Out (1950)	Joseph L. Mankiewicz	United States
People Will Talk (1951)	Joseph L. Mankiewicz	United States
The Quiet American (1958)	Joseph L. Mankiewicz	United States
Sleuth (1972)	Joseph L. Mankiewicz	United States
Somewhere in the Night (1946)	Joseph L. Mankiewicz	United States
Suddenly, Last Summer (1959)	Joseph L. Mankiewicz	United States
There Was a Crooked Man... (1970)	Joseph L. Mankiewicz	United States
