= Ralph Rosenblum =

American film editor

- Born: October 13, 1925; Brooklyn
- Died: September 6, 1995 (aged 69); Manhattan
- Occupation: film editor
- Spouse: Davida Rosenblum (m. 1948–1995)
- Awards: Best Editing 1977 Annie Hall

Ralph Rosenblum (October 13, 1925 – September 6, 1995) was an American film editor who worked extensively with the directors Sidney Lumet and Woody Allen. He won the 1977 BAFTA Award for Best Editing for his work on Annie Hall, and published an influential memoir When the Shooting Stops, the Cutting Begins: A Film Editor's Story.

== Life and career ==
Towards the end of the World War II in 1945, Rosenblum worked as a filmmaking apprentice in the U.S. Office of War Information; among his mentors there were Sidney Meyers and Helen van Dongen. Following the war he became van Dongen's assistant while she was editing Robert Flaherty's film Louisiana Story (1948), and was credited as an editor on Of Human Rights (1950), which van Dongen produced and directed. Much of Rosenblum's work in the 1950s and early 1960s was in television; he worked on shows such as The Search, Omnibus, The Guy Lombardo Show, and The Patty Duke Show. With Sid Katz and Gene Milford, he formed a company, MKR Films, that provided editorial services for television shows, spots, and corporate films.

In the 1960s, Rosenblum edited four films directed by Sidney Lumet, starting with Long Day's Journey into Night (1962). These films, which were all serious dramas, were very important to Rosenblum's career; as John Gallagher has noted,

Fail-Safe and The Pawnbroker demonstrated Rosenblum's editorial finesse. The montage ending of Fail Safe, depicting the last few moments of life on earth, and the use of concentration camp flashbacks in The Pawnbroker, brought Rosenblum his first industry recognition.

Paul Monaco has summarized Rosenblum's editing innovations on The Pawnbroker, as well as their influence, as follows, "In his work on The Pawnbroker, Rosenblum imitated devices from several French films of the previous decade, but he also extended them. Like Dede Allen, Rosenblum broke editing conventions and rules. More importantly, and like her also, his innovations shifted editing away from its traditional reliance on telling a story to the creation of a new and penetrating subjectivity in the feature film."

In 1966, Rosenblum was nominated for an American Cinema Editors "Eddie" award (Best Editing of a Feature Film) for A Thousand Clowns (1965), which was directed by Fred Coe.

In 1968, Rosenblum was hired as an "editorial consultant" to help a young Woody Allen hone a large amount of footage into what became Allen's first film, the mockumentary Take the Money and Run. Rosenblum went on to edit the next five of Allen's films, including Annie Hall, for which he won the 1977 BAFTA Award for Best Editing with Wendy Greene Bricmont. Interiors (1978) was Rosenblum's last film with Allen. Rosenblum and Allen came to a mutual decision that Rosenblum would not edit Manhattan. Susan E. Morse, who had been Rosenblum's assistant editor on several of Allen's films, became his successor and edited Allen's films for the ensuing twenty years.

For the last film, Interiors, Allen was actively involved in the editing and was fearful concerning the reception of the film. Allen's biographer Eric Lax quoted Rosenblum about the film:

He [Allen] managed to rescue Interiors, much to his credit. He was against the wall. I think he was afraid. He was testy, he was slightly short-tempered. He was fearful. He thought he had a real bomb. But he managed to pull it out with his own work. The day the reviews came out, he said to me, 'Well, we pulled this one out by the short hairs, didn't we?'

Cover of the 1986 reprinting of Rosenblum and Karen's 1979 book.

In 1979, Rosenblum published a book written with Robert Karen, When the Shooting Stops, the Cutting Begins: A Film Editor's Story. Gallagher described the importance of this book as follows:

Ralph Rosenblum did a service to editors everywhere with the 1979 publication of his memoir When the Shooting Stops . . . the Cutting Begins, a popular volume which gave the first insider's explanation of what really goes into film editing. ... In the book Rosenblum revealed that he had saved several films by creatively reshaping the footage, such as William Friedkin's The Night They Raided Minsky's and Woody Allen's first major film as a director, Take the Money and Run. Rosenblum's revelations helped bring credit to the film editing profession, and forced scholars to reconsider editorial contributions.

Rosenblum worked as a director for about five years, commencing with the documentary film Acting Out (1980). His films included Summer Solstice (1981), which was made for television and which was actor Henry Fonda's last film.

== Later years ==
For the last eight years of his life, Rosenblum taught film and film editing at Columbia University as a Full Professor of Film Directing despite having not attended college himself. In his final decade, Rosenblum taught editing at the International Film and Television Workshops in Rockport, Maine. For the final four years, he was also an Artist in Residence.

Rosenblum had been selected as a member of the American Cinema Editors.

== Selected filmography ==
The director of each film is indicated in parentheses.

- Long Day's Journey into Night (Lumet - 1962)
- Fail-Safe (Lumet - 1964)
- The Pawnbroker (Lumet - 1965)
- A Thousand Clowns (Coe - 1965)
- The Group (Lumet - 1966)
- The Producers (Brooks-1967)
- The Night They Raided Minsky's (Friedkin - 1968)
- Goodbye, Columbus (Peerce - 1969)
- Take the Money and Run (Allen - 1969) (as editorial consultant)
- Bananas (Allen - 1971)
- Sleeper (Allen - 1973)
- Love and Death (Allen - 1975)
- Annie Hall (Allen - 1977)
- North Star: Mark di Suvero (de Menil - 1977) (as editorial consultant)
- Interiors (Allen - 1978)
- Summer Solstice (1981)

== See also ==
- List of film director and editor collaborations
