= Ernestine Evans =

American journalist (1889–1967)

Ernestine Evans (August 9, 1889 – July 3, 1967) was an American journalist, editor, author and literary agent.

== Life ==
Born in Omaha, Nebraska, she lived in Elkhart, Indiana during her childhood and attended the University of Chicago, receiving a Bachelor of Philosophy degree in 1912. She was arrested in 1917, along with Peggy Baird Johns and Dorothy Day, for picketing on behalf of women's rights. In the 1920s, according to the historian Alan M. Wald, she was married to Kenneth Durant, the head of the United States branch of the Soviet press agency TASS. Secret services reports released by the United Kingdom government in 2005 state that Evans left for Britain with Durant in 1925, after Durant was expelled from the United States due to his connection with various Communist front organisations. Her relationship with Durant was over by 1935, when he married Evans's former colleague, the poet Genevieve Taggard.

In the 1930s she met Walker Evans and Ben Shahn. Walker Evans was impressed by her intelligence and was always quick to point out they were not related.

Evans's career also involved work for the United States government. She worked for the Resettlement Administration, where her duties included conducting research for Roy Stryker, a pioneer in the field of documentary photography and a central figure in the Farm Security Administration. Additionally, during World War II, Evans worked for the Office of War Information in the Overseas Publications department of the Publications Bureau. With this position, she collaborated with the African-American photographer Gordon Parks, her colleague at OWI, who would go on to rise to prominence as a documentary photographer and film director.

Evans was a member of the Society of Woman Geographers, a group co-founded by her close friend Gertrude Emerson Sen.

Toward the end of her life, Evans suffered from a slew of medical problems, including cataracts. She died in New York City. Her archival papers are held by Rare Book & Manuscript Library at Columbia University.

== Art criticism ==
Evans authored the first English-language book on the famed Mexican painter Diego Rivera. This illustrated oversize book, The Frescoes of Diego Rivera, was published in 1929 by Harcourt Brace. The following year, Rivera was invited to the United States, and in 1931, he was the subject of a retrospective at New York City's Museum of Modern Art.

== Career in publishing ==
Over the course of her career, Evans worked for several publishing firms and literary agencies, including Coward-McCann and Lippincott (now Lippincott Williams & Wilkins). She also did freelance journalism and editing for publications including The Century Magazine, The New York Herald Tribune, Asia Magazine, The New Republic, The Nation, The Virginia Quarterly Review, and The Manchester Guardian; in addition, she reviewed books for The New York Times, Saturday Review, The New Republic, Survey Graphic, and Delphian Quarterly.

Evans's journalistic career frequently took her overseas, a somewhat unusual state of affairs for a single woman at this time. Writing essays for the Virginia Quarterly Review, she wedded politics to cultural criticism as she recounted her travels through Europe as a literary agent, telling firsthand of the distinctly Russian character of train journeys to the Caucasus; a 1920s Berlin in the midst of rising Nazism; government wiretapping and the antiquarian book trade in London.

== Correspondence ==
Evans was a gregarious individual and a tireless writer of letters. She demonstrated an eagerness to expand her network of colleagues, collaborators and companions, and she engaged in correspondence with Walker Evans, Cornell Capa and Jean Renoir.

== See also ==
- Roy Stryker
- Gertrude Emerson Sen
- Society of Woman Geographers
- Office of War Information
