= Kenneth Durant =

Kenneth Durant may refer to:

- Kenneth Durant (journalist) (1889–1972), American pro-Soviet journalist, director of US branch of Soviet press agency Tass
- Kenneth W. Durant (1919–1942), United States Navy sailor
