= Helen van Dongen =

- Born: Helene Victoria Van Dongen; January 5, 1909; Amsterdam, The Netherlands
- Died: September 28, 2006 (aged 97); Brattleboro, Vermont, USA
- Other names: Helen Durant
- Occupation: Film editor
- Years active: 1927-1950
- Spouse(s): Joris Ivens (1944-?); Kenneth Durant (1950-72)

Helen Victoria van Dongen (January 5, 1909 – September 28, 2006) was a pioneering editor of documentary films, who was active from about 1925–1950. She collaborated with filmmaker Joris Ivens from 1925 to 1940, made several independent documentaries, and edited two of Robert Flaherty's films before retiring from filmmaking in her 40s.

== Life and career ==
Born in Amsterdam, van Dongen met Joris Ivens in her teens and eventually became his key collaborator. She worked on Ivens' first films, The Bridge (1928) and Rain (1929). In the 1930s she was credited as the editor of Ivens' films including Nieuwe Gronden (1934), Misère au Borinage (1934), The Spanish Earth (1937), and The 400 Million (1939). Bob Mastrangelo has written that these four films "earned Ivens a worldwide reputation and solidified van Dongen's status as one of the most important editors of her generation." He suggests that van Dongen's most important credit was as the editor of The Spanish Earth (1937), Ivens' film about the Spanish Civil War that was narrated by Ernest Hemingway: "...almost 70 years later it remains a powerful testament to the devastating effects of civil war. The intensity of van Dongen's editing is an important factor in the film's impact, particularly in the way it contrasts the horrors of war with the beauty of the Spanish countryside." Her final film with Ivens was Power and the Land (1940). Van Dongen and Ivens married briefly in the mid-1940s, after their filmmaking collaboration had ended.

In 1941, van Dongen edited Robert Flaherty's film, The Land (1942), and she co-produced and edited his film Louisiana Story (1948). Jon Lupo described their collaboration as follows: "Though both The Land and Louisiana Story are prime examples of Flaherty's filmmaking sensibility, much of the beauty and emotional gravity of the films is owed to Van Dongen's delicately focused sound and film editing." Cecile Starr also credits van Dongen for the final form of The Land. Van Dongen kept a diary during her work on Louisiana Story which she later published, and that is considered an important record both of the film and of Flaherty's career.

During World War II, van Dongen served as a filmmaker with the U.S. Office of War Information alongside editors Sidney Meyers and Ralph Rosenblum, the latter of whom she mentored.

Van Dongen also produced several films on her own. Her 1937 film, Spain in Flames, was a compilation of Spanish Civil War newsreel footage that was narrated by John Dos Passos. In 1943, she made the compilation film Russians at War using Soviet newsreel footage; the film was made for the U.S State Department. Van Dongen's personal favorite among her independent films was News Review No. 2 (1944–45), which has apparently been lost; it was a compilation film of Second World War combat footage. Her final film was Of Human Rights (1950), which she produced, directed, and edited; the film was made for the United Nations to celebrate the Universal Declaration of Human Rights.

In 1950, van Dongen married Kenneth Durant, and retired from filmmaking. The two worked together on a study of the origin and evolution of the Adirondack guideboat. After Durant's death in 1972 van Dongen continued the work, which was published in 1980.

== Selected filmography ==
This filmography is based on the comprehensive filmography posted by Hans Schoots. Schoots filmography incorporates the filmography in the book, Filming Robert Flaherty's Louisiana Story: The Helen Van Dongen Diary. The director of each film is indicated in parentheses.

- 1931: Philips Radio (Ivens): Co-editor
- 1933: Nieuwe Gronden (Ivens): Editor
- 1934: Misère au Borinage (Ivens/Storck): Editor (Note: For the subsequent Russian-language version)
- 1934: Daily Life (Richter): Editor
- 1936: Spain in Flames: Editor, Producer
- 1937: The Spanish Earth (Ivens): Editor
- 1939: The 400 Million (Ivens): Editor
- 1939: Pete-Roleum and His Cousins (van Dongen & Losey): Director, editor
- 1941: Power and the Land (Ivens): Editor
- 1942: The Land (Flaherty): Editor
- 1943: Russians at War (van Dongen): Director, editor
- 1943: Peoples of Indonesia: Editor, director
- 1944: Know Your Enemy: Japan: Co-editor
- 1946: Gift of Green (van Dongen and David Flaherty): Director, editor
- 1948: Louisiana Story (Flaherty): Editor
- 1950: Of Human Rights: Director, producer, editor
