= Tanaka Memorial =

Alleged Japanese strategic planning document from 1927 to take over the world

The Tanaka Memorial (田中上奏文, Tanaka Jōsōbun) is an alleged Japanese strategic planning document from 1927 in which Prime Minister Baron Tanaka Giichi laid out a strategy to take over the world for Emperor Hirohito. It had long been accepted as authentic and is still quoted in some Chinese textbooks. The current view of many historians is that the document itself never existed.

== Background ==
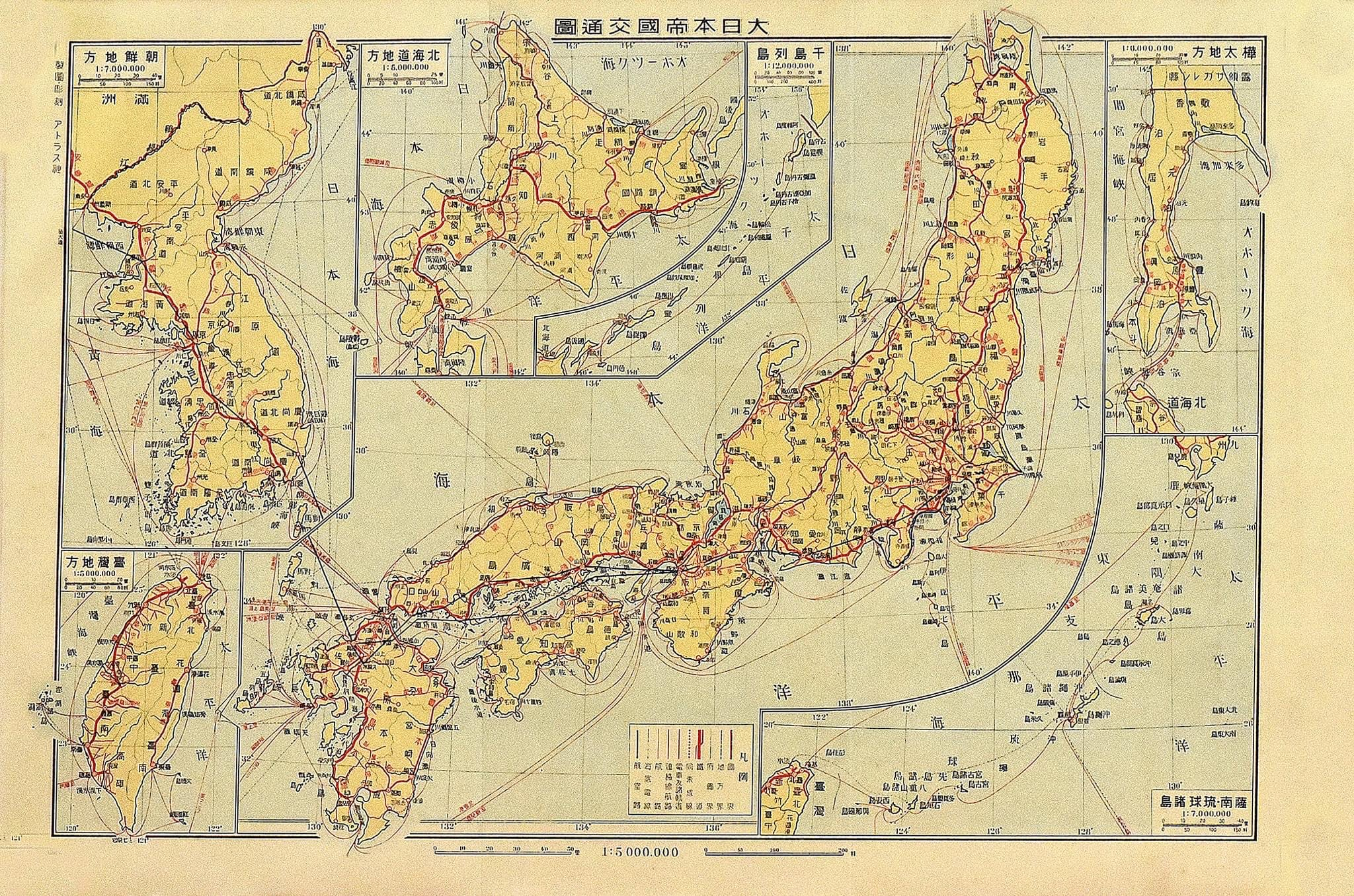
Japanese possessions in 1929: (clockwise from top left) Korea, the Japanese archipelago, Sakhalin, Ryukyu Islands and Taiwan (Formosa).

The Tanaka Memorial was first published in the December 1929 edition of the Chinese publication "時事月報" (Current Affairs Monthly) in Nanking, a Nationalist Chinese publication. It was reproduced on 24 September 1931 on pp. 923–34 of China Critic, an English publication in Shanghai. The memorial contains the assertions:

- In order to take over the world, you need to take over Asia;
- In order to take over Asia, you need to take over China;
- In order to take over China, you need to take over Manchuria and Mongolia.
- If we succeed in conquering China, the rest of the Asiatic countries and the South Sea countries will fear us and surrender to us.
- Then the world will realize that Eastern Asia is ours.

The English translation of this document was in circulation before February 1934, and formed the foundation of the lead article on the front page of the first edition of The Plain Truth magazine published by Herbert W. Armstrong in February of that year, although it had first appeared in the less widely circulated Communist International magazine in 1931.

The Tanaka Memorial was depicted extensively by United States wartime propaganda as a sort of Japanese counterpart to Mein Kampf. The installments The Battle of China and Prelude to War of Frank Capra's Academy Award-winning movie series Why We Fight describe the Tanaka Memorial as the document that was the Japanese plan for war with the United States. The Tanaka Memorial was depicted the same way in Know Your Enemy: Japan, also directed by Capra during the war. As presented in these movies, the five sequential steps to achieve Japan's goal of conquests are:

1. Conquest of Manchuria
2. Conquest of China
3. Conquest of the Soviet Union or Siberia
4. Establishment of bases in the Pacific
5. Conquest of the United States

Its authenticity is not accepted by scholars today, but the Tanaka Memorial was widely accepted as authentic in the 1930s and 1940s because Japan's actions appeared to correspond with these plans. The authenticity seemed to be confirmed by the 1931 Mukden Incident, 1937 Second Sino-Japanese War, 1939 Battles of Khalkhin Gol, 1940 Japanese invasion of French Indochina, the 1941 attack on Pearl Harbor, and the subsequent Pacific War. Historian Barak Kushner states:

There were several critical historical mistakes in the Tanaka Memorial that clearly demonstrate it a fake, but the fact that the message overlapped with Japan's general aims to militarily subdue China coincided with the belief elsewhere that the Memorial was genuine.

In 1940, Leon Trotsky published an account of how the document allegedly came to light. Soviet intelligence had obtained it from a high-placed mole in Tokyo but did not want to compromise their own security by publishing it openly, so they had leaked it through contacts that they had in the United States.

Journalist and popular historian Edwin P. Hoyt wrote that the Tanaka Memorial was an accurate representation "of what Prime Minister Tanaka had said and what the supernationalists had been saying for months." Iris Chang adds that the Japanese government at that time was so faction-ridden that it would have been impossible to carry out such a plan in any case. Historian Meirion Harries wrote that the Tanaka Memorial "was one of the most successful 'dirty tricks' of the twentieth century – a bogus document so brilliantly conceived that thirty years later Westerners were still taken in by it". Likewise, historian William G. Beasley states that "the nature of this document, as published variously in English and Chinese, does not carry conviction as to its authenticity". Dr. Haruo Tohmatsu, Professor of Diplomacy and War History of International Relations at the National Defense Academy of Japan, states that "The 'Tanaka Memorial' never existed, but the Dalian conference of that year adopted resolutions that reflected these ideas."

== Speculation of forgery ==
In the summer of 1927 (June 27 – July 7), Tanaka convened a "Far East Conference" with members of the Japanese Foreign Ministry, Army Ministry, Navy Ministry, and Finance Ministry. However, instead of ending with the production of a master plan for world domination, the Conference ended with a rough consensus that Japan should support the Kuomintang government of China in its war against the Chinese Communists, as long as the Japanese could convince General Zhang Zuolin to consolidate his base into a virtually autonomous Manchuria, which would serve as a buffer state, and eventually would fall under Japanese domination. It is alleged that the Tanaka Memorial is a secret report of this Conference.

When the Allies searched for incriminating documents to support war crime charges following the surrender of Japan, no drafts or copies of anything which corresponded to the Tanaka Memorial appeared among them; a Japanese language "original" has never been produced despite extensive research efforts.

The origin of the Memorial is still in question. Because the initial edition of the Memorial was written in Chinese, some Japanese historians have attributed it to Chinese sources, probably either Chinese Nationalists or Chinese Communists.

According to some claims, the document was forged by the Soviet Union, in an attempt to trigger a war between China and Japan, which the Soviet Union would exploit in the service of its interests. The two theories are not mutually exclusive, as the Chinese Communist Party was a member of the Comintern under control of the Soviet Union, and Soviet policy from the 1930s was to wage a propaganda war against Japanese expansionism. Also, the first translation of the Memorial into English was done by the Communist Party USA and published in the December 1931 issue of Communist International magazine. It was later re-printed in book format.

In 1939, Peter Fleming claimed that he had produced an "update" to the Tanaka Memorial, by writing an imaginary report about a secret Allied strategy conference which was attended by the Kuomintang's leader Chiang Kai-shek, and leaking it to the Japanese. This event proves that the British knew that the Tanaka Memorial was a forgery prior to World War II.

While the Tanaka Memorial is frequently treated as if it is a real document in newspapers and school textbooks which are published in China, most western historians have reached a consensus that the document is a forgery.

== See also ==
- Blood on the Sun (1945)
- Greater East Asia Co-Prosperity Sphere – World War II era Pan-Asian union under the Empire of Japan
- Hakkō ichiu: roughly translates to "all the world under one roof"; Japanese imperialist slogan popular during World War II
- An Investigation of Global Policy with the Yamato Race as Nucleus – 1943 Japanese government report on racial theory and policy
- Know Your Enemy: Japan (1945)
- RAM Plan, a Serbian multi-vector plan to establish a Greater Serbia in the Balkans following the breakup of Yugoslavia
