= Mini Aodla Freeman =

Inuk author

- Born: Cape Hope Islands
- Occupations: Author, translator
- Notable work: Life Among the Qallunaat
- Spouse: Milton Freeman
- Parent(s): Malla and Thomas Aodla

Mini Aodla Freeman is an Inuk playwright, writer, poet and essayist.

She was born in July 1936 on Cape Hope Island (Nunaaluk) in James Bay, Northwest Territories (now Nunavut), Canada.

Mini Aodla was taken by the authorities to Bishop Horden Memorial School, a Canadian Indian residential school, on Moose Factory Island, Ontario.

When her family learnt of plans to have her adopted by a non-Inuit family, they enrolled her in the Sainte-Thérèse-de-l'Enfant-Jésus Residential School in Fort George (now Chisasibi), Quebec which she attended until 1952.

Shortly after leaving school, she became a tuberculosis patient at Mountain Sanatorium in Hamilton, Ontario.

== Training ==
Fluent in English, Inuktitut and the Cree language Freeman provided translation services as a patient in the Mountain Sanatorium in Hamilton. The staff encouraged her to take nurses training, which she had begun at the Sainte-Thérèse-de-l'Enfant-Jésus Residential School. When she was medically discharged, she chose to return home.

== Career ==
Freeman found a job in Moose Factory and shortly after that was informed by the local Indian agent that there was a federal government job waiting for her in Ottawa. The Ottawa position was with the Welfare Division in the then-Department of Northern Affairs and National Resources (now Crown–Indigenous Relations and Northern Affairs Canada and Indigenous Services Canada) where in addition to translation work in Ottawa she visited Inuit patients in numerous hospitals and sanatoria in Alberta, Saskatchewan, Manitoba, Ontario, and Quebec. She was also posted to Frobisher Bay (now Iqaluit, Nunavut) to serve as translator for the federal welfare officer.

In 1963 she became the secretary of Eugène Rhéaume, the Member of Parliament for the Northwest Territories from 1963 to 1965. Between 1973 and 1976 Freeman was secretary and translator for the Inuit Land Use and Occupancy Project and from 1979-81 she was executive secretary of the Land Claims Secretariat at Inuit Tapirisat of Canada (now Inuit Tapiriit Kanatami). She was manager of the newly established Inuit Broadcasting Corporation between 1981 and 1982.

From 1991 until 1998 Freeman was employed by Corrections Canada as a cultural counsellor for Inuit and First Nations inmates at the Bowden Institution in Alberta.

== Writing ==
Freeman's work has included short stories, poems, and social commentary that have appeared in a wide range of publications, including the Canadian Children's Annual (1975 and 1976 editions), The Canadian Encyclopedia and the Proceedings of the Royal Society of Canada.

A play she wrote and produced, titled "Survival in the South", was performed at the 1971 Dominion Drama Festival and in 1973 at the National Arts Centre in Ottawa and published in a 1980 book.

Other published works include Inuit Women Artists: Voices from Cape Dorset, Leven in het noordpoolgebrie [Living in the Arctic] and the epilogue to a collection of scientific papers published in association with the opening of a permanent exhibition on arctic life at the Carnegie Museum of Natural History.

Her best-known work is Life Among the Qallunaat. First published in 1978, then translated into German, French and Greenlandic, this memoir details her life living in Inuit communities, her journey of learning while living outside those communities, and the rapid changes that Inuit faced during the 1940s and 1950s.

Life Among the Qallunaat was widely reviewed and was a finalist for the Governor General's Award for Nonfiction in 1978, but perhaps because copies were hard to find, the book was not widely known until the University of Manitoba Press republished it in 2016.

The 2015 edition was selected as one of the Association of Canadian Publishers' 49th Shelf's 2015 Books of the Year.

In 2016, Life Among the Qallunaat won the Electa Quinney Award for Published Stories and the Mary Scorer Award for Best Book by a Manitoba publisher.

== Documentary filmmaker ==
In 1982, Freeman co-operated with Hugh Brody, a British-based award-winning documentary filmmaker, in filming an 80-minute film titled People of the Islands. The film was shot on Flaherty Island in the Belcher Islands, Northwest Territories (now Nunavut) where Robert J. Flaherty began his documentary film-making career in 1913-14 with the assistance of Freeman's maternal grandfather, George Weetaltuk.

In 2013, Freeman narrated a detailed oral history of the Cape Hope Island Inuit community in the film Nunaaluk – A Forgotten Story directed by Quebec film-maker Louise Abbott.

The Nunaaluk (Cape Hope Island) community in James Bay – where Freeman was born and grew up -- was established by her grandfather George Weetaltuk in the 1920s. In 1960 the entire community was forcibly relocated by the federal government to a large and unfamiliar Inuit Cree community on the coast of Hudson Bay, an event that as narrator, she poignantly chronicles.

== Educator ==
Since 1969, Freeman has served as an Inuit language and cultural instructor in schools, colleges and universities in Alberta, Newfoundland and Labrador, Northwest Territories, Nunavut, and Ontario.

She has served as a cultural counsellor to Indigenous inmates in prison, and as a cultural adviser to the Canadian Broadcasting Corporation, the National Film Board of Canada, the Canadian National Museum of Civilization (now Canadian Museum of History), the Glenbow Museum (Calgary), the Carnegie Museum of Natural History (Pittsburgh), and in later years as an Elder at the University of Alberta, MacEwan University, and at the CFB Edmonton. She was also actively involved in the Truth and Reconciliation Commission of Canada from 2007 to 2015.
