= The 400 Million =

1939 documentary

- Directed by: Joris Ivens
- Written by: Joris Ivens; John Ferno
- Narrated by: Fredric March
- Cinematography: John Ferno; Robert Capa
- Edited by: Helen van Dongen
- Music by: Hanns Eisler
- Release date: March 7, 1939 (US)
- Running time: 52 minutes

The 400 Million, also known as China in 1938, was a 1939 black-and-white documentary film by Dutch filmmaker Joris Ivens about the Second Sino-Japanese War, part of the East Asian theater of World War II. The filmmaker moved between the Republican, Communist, and guerrilla forces of the Chinese resistance to Japanese invasion. Their dialogue in Mandarin is accompanied by English translations read by American actors.

== Name ==
The title refers to the population of China, estimated from the highly untrustworthy official censuses.

== Narrative ==
The film begins with the carnage left by Japanese bombing in northeastern China, describing it as an unprovoked act of aggression. It then provides a brief overview of Chinese history and its connections and importance to Europe and North America. It discusses the modernization undertaken by the Republic and suggests that nascent development provoked Japan's attack. Japan's history of aggression is detailed, with the United States's continuing exports of iron and steel to the country pointedly noted. The film takes pains to present the Chinese factions as united against the invaders and ends with some small Chinese victories to suggest a turning tide of battle, especially praising the 8th Route Army.

== Legacy ==
Footage from the film was later incorporated into Frank Capra's American propaganda film The Battle of China, which also made prominent use of "The March of the Volunteers", the song which later became the Chinese National Anthem.

The camera from the film was donated by Ivens to the Chinese Communist Party, which used it to begin the Yan'an Film Group.
