= Summer Solstice (1981 film) =

1981 American film directed by Ralph Rosenblum

- Genre: Romance; Drama
- Written by: Bill Phillips
- Directed by: Ralph Rosenblum
- Starring: Henry Fonda; Myrna Loy; Stephen Collins; Lindsay Crouse
- Music by: John Nagy
- Country of origin: United States
- Original language: English

Production
- Executive producer: Bruce R. Marson
- Producer: Stephen Schlow
- Cinematography: Bob King
- Editor: Dick Bartlett
- Running time: 50 minutes
- Production companies: Boston Broadcasters Incorporated; WCVB Boston

Original release
- Network: ABC
- Release: December 30, 1981

Summer Solstice is a 1981 American made-for-television romantic drama film directed by Ralph Rosenblum, written by Bill Phillips and starring Henry Fonda (in his final acting performance) and Myrna Loy.

== Summary ==
The film centers on Joshua and Margaret Turner, an aging couple visiting the beach where they met 50 years earlier.

== Cast ==
- Henry Fonda as Joshua Turner
- Myrna Loy as Margaret Burnside Turner
- Stephen Collins as Young Josh Turner
- Lindsay Crouse as Young Maggie Burnside
- Thomas Ruisinger as Mr. Burnside
- Jo Henderson as Mrs. Burnside
- Patricia Elliott as Emily
- Marcus Smythe as Ranger
- Christopher Childs as Justice of the Peace
- P.J. Hussey as Malcolm Burnside
- Michael Simons as Toby
- Elisa Erali as Lucy
- Mara Clark as Fisherwoman
- Hamilton Benz as Fisherman
- Marten Anderson as The Lover
- Frank Avruch as The Doctor
