= The Spanish Earth =

1937 film

- Directed by: Joris Ivens
- Written by: Ernest Hemingway; John Dos Passos
- Produced by: Herman Shumlin
- Narrated by: Orson Welles (English language version); Ernest Hemingway (English language version); Jean Renoir (French language version)
- Cinematography: John Ferno; Joris Ivens
- Edited by: Helen van Dongen
- Music by: Marc Blitzstein
- Production company: Contemporary Historians Inc.
- Distributed by: Garrison Films
- Release date: July 11, 1937
- Running time: 52 minutes
- Country: United States
- Languages: English; Spanish; German

The Spanish Earth is a 1937 anti-fascist film made during the Spanish Civil War in support of the democratically elected Republicans, whose forces included a wide range from the political left like communists, socialists, anarchists, to moderates like centrists, and liberalist elements. The film was directed by Joris Ivens, written by John Dos Passos and Ernest Hemingway, narrated by Orson Welles and re-recorded by Hemingway (with Jean Renoir doing the narration in the French release), with music composed by Marc Blitzstein and arranged by Virgil Thomson.

== Description ==
The film opens in the village of Fuentidueña de Tajo (called "Fuentedueña" in the movie), showing the villagers trying to scratch a living from the dry soil and explaining the importance of bringing water to irrigate the fields so more crops can be produced and embattled Madrid can be fed. A map shows the position of the village on the Madrid-Valencia road, which must be kept open at all costs so the capital can be defended. The scene moves to Madrid, with another map showing the front line running west of the city, with a rebel salient in the Ciudad Universitaria, which the loyalists are shown attacking.

The city is the village inverted; while the earth of Fuentedueña is simply upturned, the streets of Madrid look as if they have been maniacally plowed. The blood that stains the streets contrasts painfully with the water that courses through the soil. Ivens planned the documentary as a dialectic, alternating between village and city until the synthesis is reached. Thus rhythm changes with location; anonymous peasants are juxtaposed with historical figures like La Pasionaria and Manuel Azaña, president of the Republic.

At the end of the film, the loyalists have driven off the rebel attack on the bridge over the Jarama, keeping the road open, and the water is shown flowing to the fields: the irrigation has succeeded.

== Production ==
In December 1936, several literary figures, including Lillian Hellman, Ernest Hemingway, John Dos Passos, Dorothy Parker, and Archibald MacLeish, formed and funded a company they named Contemporary Historians, Inc., to back a film project proposed by Dutch filmmaker Joris Ivens. Hellman and MacLeish collaborated on the story. Ernest Hemingway was a major contributor as well. The film's backers specifically meant the film to demonstrate support for the Republican forces and the Americans of the Abraham Lincoln Battalion who fought against the Nationalists, unlike Hollywood's only other effort on the subject, the apolitical 1937 film, The Last Train from Madrid. A later film, Blockade (1938), was also sympathetic to the Republicans.

Orson Welles, who starred in Archibald MacLeish's verse play, Panic (1935), and had recently performed the role of narrator in his CBS Radio verse play, The Fall of the City, recorded the narration for The Spanish Earth in May 1937. An additional English-language release is narrated by Ernest Hemingway. A French-language version is narrated by Jean Renoir.

President Franklin D. Roosevelt and Eleanor Roosevelt invited Hemingway and Ivens to show the film at the White House in advance of its premiere. The version screened for the Roosevelts on July 8, 1937, was narrated by Orson Welles.

== Reception ==
A review in The New York Times found Hemingway's narration "a definitely propagandist effort" and preferred the camera work that "argues gently and persuasively, with the irrefutable argument of pictorially recorded fact, that the Spanish people are fighting, not for broad principles of Muscovite Marxism, but for the right to the productivity of a land denied them through years of absentee landlordship." The same reviewer in a longer essay concluded that: "Contemporary Historians, Inc...are Ivens' employers and it is their right to dispose of his product as they see fit. They have used it as a violent outcry against fascism. Ivens might have made it lasting art as well."

Ten years later, Bosley Crowther wrote: "The best film we've yet seen on the Spanish tragedy is still Joris Ivens' long-released The Spanish Earth.

The production of The Spanish Earth is a major subplot within Pete Carvill's book A Duel of Bulls: Hemingway and Welles in Love and War.

== Preservation status ==
George Eastman House has preserved the film, which was shown on Turner Classic Movies on December 14, 2011. This version has the narration read by Orson Welles.

== See also ==
- Spain in Flames (1937)
- España 1936 (1937)
