= Cape Hope Islands =

Island group in Nunavut, Canada

- Location within Nunavut Location within Canada

Geography
- Location: James Bay
- Coordinates: 52.4°N 78.8°W
- Archipelago: Arctic Archipelago

Administration
- Canada
- Nunavut: Nunavut
- Region: Qikiqtaaluk

Demographics
- Population: Uninhabited

The Cape Hope Islands are an uninhabited Canadian arctic islands group located within the midsection of James Bay in Nunavut, Canada. They are situated south of Vieux-Comptoir (Old Factory).

== History ==
The Inuit who lived on the Cape Hope Islands in the 1930s were transferred by the government to Great Whale River in 1960. They now live in Kuujjuarapik, Quebec, and there is no longer a permanent settlement on the Cape Hope Islands.

== Notable people ==
- Mini Aodla Freeman, publisher, author, producer, was born on the Cape Hope Islands.
