= The Pottery Maker =

1926 film

- Directed by: Robert J. Flaherty
- Written by: Robert J. Flaherty
- Produced by: Maude Adams, for the Metropolitan Museum of Arts
- Cinematography: Robert J. Flaherty
- Edited by: Robert J. Flaherty
- Release date: 1926
- Running time: 8 minutes
- Country: United States

The Pottery Maker, also known as Story of a Potter, is a 1926 American documentary short film directed by Robert J. Flaherty.

== Production ==
The Pottery Maker is one of two short films produced by private sponsors and directed by filmmaker Robert J. Flaherty after the completion of his second feature Moana in 1925.

Produced by the New York Metropolitan Museum of Arts, and sponsored by actress and Flaherty admirer Maude Adams, the short film was shot in the basement of the museum, using new Mazda incandescent lamps.
