= Jo Henderson =

American actress (1934–1988)

- Henderson in the play Rose (1981)
- Born: May 10, 1934; Buffalo, New York, United States
- Died: August 6, 1988 (aged 54); Chinle, Arizona
- Occupation: Actress

Jo Henderson (May 10, 1934 – August 6, 1988) was an American stage, film and television actress. She played Kate McCleary on NBC's Search for Tomorrow and Wilma Marlowe on ABC's All My Children.

== Life and career ==
Born in Buffalo, Henderson grew up in Kalamazoo, Michigan and studied at the Michigan State University. She started her professional career in New York City, and was mainly active on stage, appearing both in Broadway and Off-Broadway works, as well as in regional playhouse productions.

In 1976, Henderson won an Obie Award for Distinguished Performance by an Actress for Ladyhouse Blues. In 1984, she received a Tony Award nomination for Best Featured Actress in a Play thanks to her performance in Play Memory, losing to Christine Baranski. Also active in films and on television, Henderson died in traffic collision in Chinle, Arizona, at the age of 54.

== Selected filmography ==
- Summer Solstice (TV, 1981)
- Lianna (1983)
- Murder in Coweta County (TV, 1983)
- All My Children (TV, 1985–88)
- Matewan (1987)
- Rachel River (1987)
