= Know Your Enemy: Japan =

1945 World War II propaganda film by Frank Capra

- reel 1
- Directed by: Frank Capra; Joris Ivens
- Written by: Frank Capra; Carl Foreman; John Huston; Edgar Peterson
- Narrated by: Walter Huston; Dana Andrews
- Edited by: Major Aaxton; Frank Bracht; Elmo Williams; Helen van Dongen
- Music by: Dimitri Tiomkin
- Release date: August 9, 1945
- Running time: 63 minutes
- Country: United States
- Language: English

Know Your Enemy: Japan is an American World War II propaganda film about the war in the Pacific directed by Frank Capra, with additional direction by experimental documentary filmmaker Joris Ivens. The film, which was commissioned by the U.S. War Department, sought to educate American soldiers about Japan, its people, society and history, and its totalitarian militaristic government. However, the film never realized its full purpose because its completion was delayed by disputes between Hollywood and Washington, and the abrupt end of the Pacific War soon after the film's release in August 1945. The film's first public screening was in 1977 as part of a PBS special.

== Plot ==
The film begins with a text preamble which states that the Japanese in America valiantly fought for America because they stood for values like "freedom" and "liberty" and in accordance with the preamble, the rest of the film does not portray all Japanese people as aggressors, it only portrays Japanese natives as aggressors. It goes on to describe the lives of the soldiers of the Imperial Japanese Army. This section of the film mainly focuses on the appearance and diet of the individual soldier, and as a result, it devotes much less attention to his tactics and strategy. The film comments that the soldiers of the Imperial Japanese army are "as alike as photographic prints off the same negative."

The Japanese are said to be devoted to Emperor Hirohito, and the narration states that they "entrust to one man the powers of the President of the United States, the Prime Minister of Great Britain, the Premier of Soviet Russia; add to them the powers of the Pope, the Archbishop of Canterbury, the head of the Russian Orthodox Church and top it all with the divine authority of our own Son of God and you will begin to understand what Hirohito means to the Japanese, why they call him the God-Emperor."

After going over Hirohito's divinity and saying that his divine origins are shared by the Japanese people as a whole, the film then describes Shinto, a Japanese religion by saying that it had been a "quaint religion for a quaint people" until 1870 when a mad, fanatical, conquer-the-world doctrine, based on the commandment of Jimmu, the first emperor of Japan, to "let us extend the capital and cover the eight corners of the world under one roof" was woven into it and called Hakkō Ichiu (八紘一宇, literally "eight crown cords, one roof", i.e., "all the world under one roof"). The film describes the Yasukuni Shrine, a Shinto shrine in which all of Japan's war dead are enshrined and from which the spirits of those killed in battle shall return.

After saying repeatedly, "If you are Japanese, you believe these things," then the film slightly shifts gears by asking its audience the following question, "But if you're not Japanese, then what is the real Japan, the Japan of the geographer, anthropologist, and historian?" After a brief geography lesson, the idea of the Japanese people's "pure divine blood" is countered with accusations that it is nothing more than a "plasma cocktail." Then the history section begins and in it, the Emperor is portrayed as having little political power, with the real power being in the hands of daimyōs and their armies of samurai. The samurai are vilified along with their code of Bushido, with the film's narrator saying that it "not only sanctioned double dealing and treachery but looked at it as an art to be cultivated." The arrival of Christianity and the warlords' expulsion of Westerners and isolation of Japan for 200 years in reaction to its teachings of peace and equality are all used to vilify them even more.

The film then juxtaposes the Age of Enlightenment's scientific and artistic advances which occurred in the West with Japan's stagnant isolation during the same period, broken by Commodore Perry's forced opening of Japan in 1853. The Westernization of Japan during the Meiji Restoration is also discussed but it is always discussed in the context of how the warlords used it to further their own ambitions. The elimination of the position of Shogun and the elevation of the previously-powerless Emperor as a rallying point in 1868 with the warlords "reserving for themselves and themselves alone the right to speak for him and guide his policies" gives the film's audience the impression that Hirohito was an effectively-powerless figurehead. The film invokes the Tanaka Memorial, a document which is generally considered a forgery today, as Baron Giichi Tanaka's secret blueprint for world conquest, Japan's Mein Kampf.

The power of the warlords continues to be emphasized in the rest of the film and it is summarized by the statement that they never adopted the moral or ethical principles that came along with the ideas that they borrowed from the Western World and all information is filtered down to the Japanese people after it has first been approved and altered to suit the purposes of the warlords. The film emphasizes this statement by showing its audience that despite Japan's modernization, most of the Japanese people still lived and worked in ways which were effectively unchanged since the 17th century and even the white-collar Japanese man, once he arrived home, lived as his ancestors lived in the Middle Ages.

The warlords' control over the Japanese people is used to explain the current expansionist and warlike actions of the Japanese, and the film ends with the wartime circumstances of Japan in 1945.

== Production ==
=== Development ===
When the U.S. entered World War II, Army Chief of Staff George C. Marshall made an official request to the director Frank Capra for the production of a series of documentary films to be released to the general public and used for the orientation of American soldiers before and during deployment. Commissioned as a major and placed in charge of the 834th Photo Signal Detachment, Capra produced the film series Why We Fight, as well as other films, including Two Down and One to Go and Know Your Enemy: Japan.

Although production on Know Your Enemy: Japan began in 1942, it was troubled from the very beginning by the inability of the U.S. government to determine what exactly the foreign policy towards Japan should be.

=== Writing ===
Warren Duff wrote the first screenplay for the film in June 1942, but it was shelved when the Army General Staff moved to Los Angeles. Frank Capra hired Joris Ivens to supervise the documentary in early 1943, but after Ivens submitted a 20-minute preview, which treated the Japanese as an open-minded people being led by a vilified Emperor Hirohito, Capra told Ivens to leave the project because the U.S. Army had disapproved so much of the approach he had taken towards his portrayal of the Japanese that they had requested he be removed from the production. Allen Rivkin, one of the writers working on the script, commented that a large setback for the film's production was the realization that "we couldn't call Hirohito a war criminal because we knew we had to deal with him later and it threw us into a tailspin. That's why it took so long."

Edgar Peterson and John Huston were initially considered to direct the film before Capra and Ivens themselves took the role.

Eventually the scriptwriters felt Capra had lost direction in the film, apart from his desire to give the film racist overtones. The writers did not know that Capra's racist depictions were at the request of the U.S. military. In January 1945, the film underwent a series of final revisions because The Pentagon thought it still had "too much sympathy for the Jap people."

=== Editing ===
The film is compiled from footage which was obtained from newsreels, the UN, enemy film, fictional Japanese movies which were used to give it a historical background, and re-enactments which were supervised by the war department. The footage is narrated by Walter Huston and Dana Andrews. Footage from prewar Japanese jidaigeki films featured Ryūnosuke Tsukigata, Kunitarō Sawamura, and a young Kōji Mitsui, who later became a leading character actor.

== Release ==
The film's main purpose was to maintain the fighting spirit of the United States military forces for the final push against the Japanese Home Islands, where the resistance was expected to be the fiercest. The historian John W. Dower said that the film

was a potpourri of most of the English speaking world's dominant clichés about the Japanese enemy, excluding the crudest, most vulgar, and most blatantly racist [which] captured the passions and presumptions that underlay not only the ferocity of the clash in Asia and the Pacific, but also the sweeping agenda of reformist policies that the Allied powers subsequently attempted to impose upon a defeated and occupied Japan.

The release date of Know Your Enemy: Japan happened to be August 9, 1945, three days after the atomic bombing of Hiroshima and the day that Nagasaki was bombed. When it became clear that the Japanese surrender was becoming a reality, American foreign policy in the Pacific rapidly switched from war to negotiation. In response, General Douglas MacArthur decided that the film should not be shown, as previously planned, to all military personnel in the Pacific Theatre. He also recommended that it should be withheld from public release.

== See also ==
- List of Allied propaganda films of World War II
