= España 1936 =

1936 film by Jean-Paul Le Chanois

- Directed by: Jean-Paul Le Chanois
- Written by: Luis Buñuel (story); Pierre Unik (commentary)
- Produced by: Luis Buñuel
- Distributed by: Subsecretaría de Propaganda del Gobierno de la República
- Release date: 1937
- Running time: 35 minutes
- Country: Spain
- Language: Spanish

España 1936 is a 1937 Spanish short documentary film.

== Production ==
The film was directed by Jean-Paul Le Chanois and produced and co-written by Luis Buñuel, about the early days of the Spanish Civil War. It contains much genuine newsreel footage. In 1937, Spanish newspaper El Sol said this of the film:

Among the unique scenes in this film, special mention should be made of the following, due to their value as historical documents: the speech of Alvarez del Vayo at the League of Nations, the speech of La Pasionaria in Paris, the defence of Irún and San Sebastián by the Basque militiamen and the battles in the streets of Carabanchel, Casa de Campo, Parque del Oeste and Somosierra. In all of them the heroism of the soldiers of the people reaches levels of unparalleled bravery. Never before have scenes of such realism been shown on the screen as in España 1936, the most authentic and realistic documentary made of this war.

Although Buñuel made the film in association with the French Communist Party, the film lacks a lot of the overt biases common to political documentaries of this era. Buñuel chronicled this film in his typical style showcasing the inhumanity, death, and destruction of the Spanish Civil War rather than focusing solely on a political message supporting one side or the other. This notable style of Buñuel stands in contrast to other politically based documentaries of the time including Triumph of the Will, The Man with the Movie Camera, and Night Mail, among others.

== See also ==
- The Spanish Earth
- Spain in Flames
