= Spain in Flames =

- Directed by: Helen van Dongen
- Release dates: February 1937 (New York City, US)
- Running time: 65 minutes
- Country: United States

Spain in Flames is a 1937 compilation film made by Helen van Dongen during the Spanish Civil War. Hal Erickson has written that the film "... is remarkable in its willingness to offer both sides of the conflict -- though its sympathies are firmly with the Loyalists." The film consists of two parts. The first, "The Fight for Freedom", was based on film footage from a Spanish government documentary Spain and the Fight for Freedom. A foreword by the then Spanish Ambassador to the United States, Fernando de los Ríos, began one of the film's screenings in New York in 1937.

The second part, "They Shalt Not Pass", was based on a short film No Pasaran! done by the Artkino Film Company of the Soviet Union, where van Dongen was working at the time the film was made. John Dos Passos narrated parts of the film, and the commentary was written by Dos Passos, Ernest Hemingway, Archibald MacLeish, and Prudencio de Pareda. Erickson writes that, "The horrendous images of battlefield carnage, not to mention the close-ups of suffering and dying Spanish children, still pack a wallop when seen today."

Later, Hemingway, Dos Passos, Lillian Hellman and others founded the company Contemporary Historians, which produced another film called The Spanish Earth (1937), directed by Joris Ivens and edited by van Dongen.

Spain in Flames was banned in New Brunswick, New Jersey and Waterbury, Connecticut. A screening of the film, accompanied by a speech from Granville Hicks, was also banned in Provincetown, Massachusetts.

== See also ==
- The Spanish Earth (1937)
- España 1936 (1937)
