= Louisiana Story =

1948 film by Robert J. Flaherty

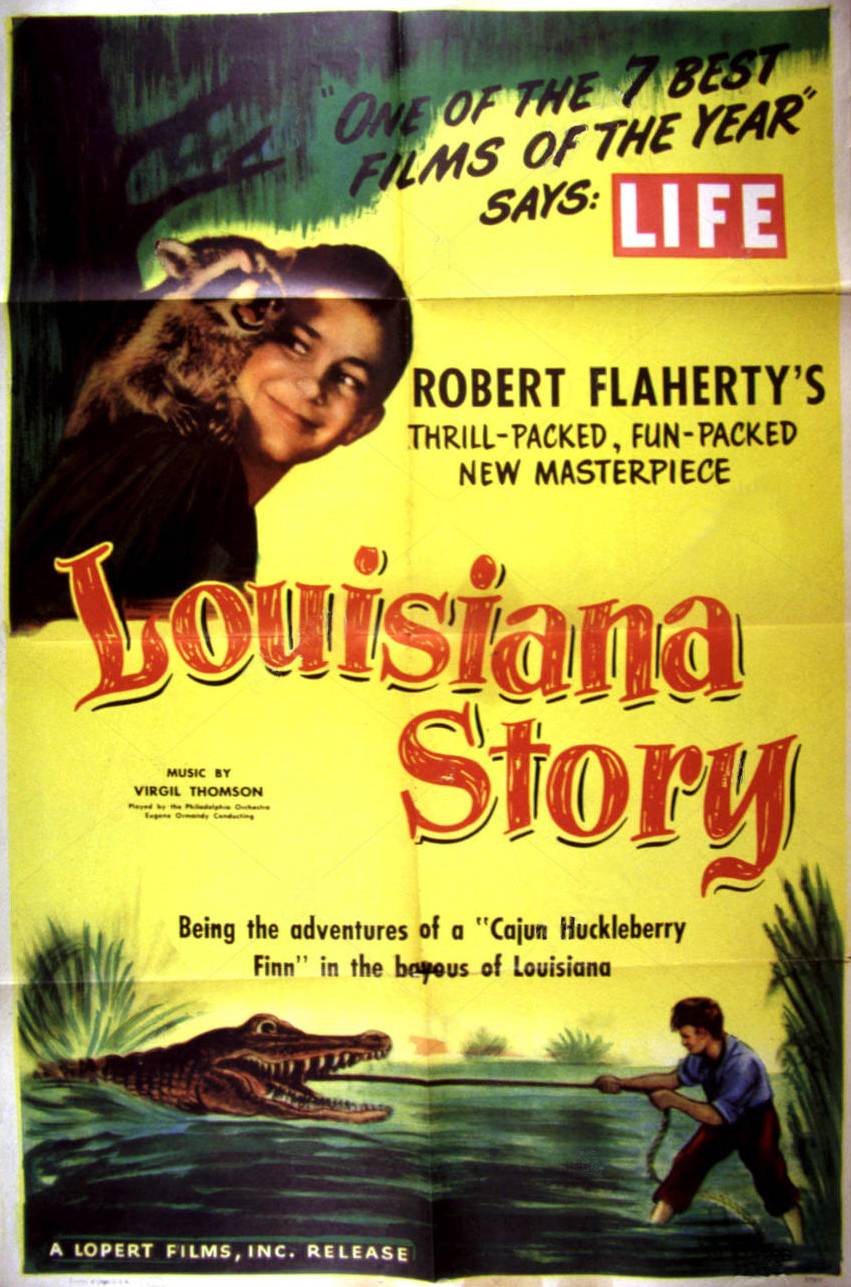
- Theatrical release poster
- Directed by: Robert J. Flaherty
- Written by: Robert J. Flaherty; Frances H. Flaherty
- Produced by: Robert J. Flaherty
- Starring: Joseph Boudreaux; Lionel Le Blanc; E. Bienvenu; Frank Hardy; Oscar J Yarborough
- Cinematography: Richard Leacock
- Edited by: Helen van Dongen
- Music by: Virgil Thomson
- Production company: Robert Flaherty Productions Inc. for Standard Oil Co. of New Jersey
- Distributed by: Lopert Films
- Release date: September 28, 1948 (New York)
- Running time: 78 minutes
- Country: United States
- Languages: English; French

Louisiana Story is a 1948 American black-and-white drama film directed and produced by Robert J. Flaherty. The script was written by Flaherty and his wife Frances H. Flaherty. Although it has historically been represented as a documentary film, the events and characters depicted are fictional. The film was commissioned by the Standard Oil Company to promote its drilling ventures in the Louisiana bayous.

== Plot ==
A young Cajun boy and his pet raccoon live an idyllic existence playing in the bayous of Louisiana. His elderly father allows an oil company to drill for oil in the inlet that runs behind their house. An inland barge is towed into the inlet from interconnecting waterways. The rig crew completes its operation and its friendly drillers depart, leaving behind a clean environment and a wealthy family.

== Cast ==
- Lenador Devinchi
- Lionel Le Blanc as His Father
- E. Bienvenu as His Mother (as Mrs. E. Bienvenu)
- Frank Hardy as The Driller
- C.P. Guedry as The Boilerman

== Production ==
Louisiana Story was shot on location over the course of 15 months in the Louisiana bayou country, using local residents for actors. Producer Robert J. Flaherty spent three months searching for a locale before filming began.

Although the film was sponsored by the Standard Oil Company, the company's name is not heard or seen, and Flaherty retained full ownership of the film. Of the approximately 300,000 feet of negative film shot, only about 8,000 feet were used in the final cut. Standard Oil used some of the remaining film to create two short promotional films. The film's budget was $258,000.

The boy, named in the film as Alexander Napoleon Ulysses Le Tour, but in the credits just identified as "the boy", is played by Louisiana native Joseph Boudreaux. When filming a scene involving a fight with an alligator, Boudreaux was so adept at subduing the alligator that the film crew tied a rope around his waist to pull him back to the shore to make the struggle seem more realistic.

The film was photographed by Richard Leacock and edited by Helen van Dongen, who were also the associate producers. It was distributed by the independent Lopert Films.

In 1952, it was reissued by an exploitation film outfit with a new title, Cajun, on the bottom half of a double bill with another film titled Watusi.

== Reception ==
In a contemporary review for The New York Times, critic Bosley Crowther wrote: "Like all of Flaherty's pictures, it is a gem of the cinematographer's art and it ripples and flows with deep feeling for beauty and simplicity. ... Within this simple story framework, Flaherty—being his own writer as well as director—has devised a genial. romantic parable. a conspicuously idyllic union of the pulse and rhythm of primitive life with that of the machine. ... Ironically. the most powerful and truly eloquent phases of this film are not those portraying the youngster, beautiful and tender though they be, but those demonstrating the great energy in the operations of a drilling crew."

== Awards ==
The film was nominated for an Academy Award for Best Writing, Motion Picture Story in 1948.

In 1949, Virgil Thomson won the Pulitzer Prize for Music for his score, which is based on a famous field tape of authentic Cajun musicians and performed by the Philadelphia Orchestra conducted by Eugene Ormandy.

In 1994, Louisiana Story was selected for preservation in the United States National Film Registry by the Library of Congress as being "culturally, historically, or aesthetically significant".

The film was included in the top 10 of the first British Film Institute's Sight and Sound poll in 1952. It was nominated by the American Film Institute for inclusion in its AFI's 100 Years of Film Scores list in 2005.

== See also ==
- Docufiction
- List of docufiction films
