= Frances H. Flaherty =

American screenwriter and film director

Frances Hubbard Flaherty
- Born: Frances Johnson Hubbard; December 5, 1883; Cambridge, Massachusetts
- Died: June 22, 1972 (aged 88); Dummerston, Vermont, U.S.
- Education: Bryn Mawr
- Occupation: Filmmaker
- Spouse: Robert Joseph Flaherty
- Children: 3, including Monica Flaherty Frassetto

Frances Hubbard Flaherty (December 5, 1883 – June 22, 1972) was a film director and screenwriter known for Louisiana Story , The Land, and Moana (1926). In 1955, Flaherty founded The Flaherty Seminar, a film study center for filmmakers, curators, and students.

== Early life ==
Frances Johnson Hubbard was born in Bonn, Germany into "a household of erudition, gentility, and privilege," the daughter of Lucius L. Hubbard (1849–1933), who was studying mineralogy at the University of Bonn, and his wife Frances (1852–1927). She graduated from Bryn Mawr College in 1905, studied music and poetry in Paris and was also secretary of the local Suffragette Society.

She met Robert Flaherty in 1903 in Painesdale, Michigan, where he was employed by her father; the two fell in love, but Flaherty, then "a lumberjack-handyman... of no means and few expectations," was dismissed by her father, after which Frances had a nervous breakdown and was treated at a sanatorium in Dansville, New York, while Flaherty went to British Columbia. Frances visited him there during the summer of 1908, but the two quarreled, and Frances broke their engagement and went back East.

Over the next few years, she "traveled to New York and Paris to continue her conservatory training in music and piano, and in 1911 she visited the West Indies and South America." On November 12, 1914, she married Flaherty in a civil ceremony in New York City; it is not clear how their relationship was renewed: "Legend has it that she sent him a congratulatory telegram on hearing reports of his return with the rediscovery of the Belcher Islands confirmed; and he shot back a reply that included a proposal of marriage." She herself wrote in a self-profile for the tenth reunion of her Bryn Mawr class in 1915:

Coming back for a visit to my own country last July, I found myself caught by the war, and doubly caught in the toils of an old romance. I married my husband for several very plain and simple reasons: 1. Because an innate sense for the preservation of his own genius has saved him from all educational institutions or instruction of any kind. 2. Because that genius is for (a) exploration, (Profession: Exploration and Mining), and (b) music and the arts, (Avocations: playing the violin and portrait photography).

== Career ==
Flaherty worked alongside her husband Robert Flaherty on several films, including Louisiana Story (1948), for which she earned an Academy Award nomination for Best Original Story. Flaherty appeared in a feature-length documentary on her and her husband's film work, Hidden and Seeking (1971) directed by Peter Werner. She was a crucial part of Robert Flaherty's success in film. She took on the role of director at times, helped to edit and distribute his films, even landing governmental film contracts for England.

After Robert's death, Flaherty began inviting filmmakers, critics, curators, musicians and others to the Flaherty farm in Vermont, and in 1955 founded there a film study center that still exists as the Flaherty Seminar.

== Personal life ==
She was married to collaborator and documentary filmmaker Robert J. Flaherty from 1914 until his death in 1951.

The couple had three children, Barbara van Ingen (married to Botha van Ingen of Van Ingen & Van Ingen in Mysore), Monica Flaherty Frassetto, and Frances Rohr. They were married until Robert's death in 1951.

Flaherty died on June 22, 1972, in Dummerston, Vermont.

== Filmography ==
Year	Title	Role	Notes
1948	Louisiana Story	Writer, Director	
1942	The Land		
1926	Moana		

== Awards and nominations ==
Year	Award	Category	Title	Result	Notes
1948	Academy Awards	WRITING (Motion Picture Story)	Louisiana Story	Nominated	

== Publications ==
- Flaherty, Frances Hubbard; Leacock, Ursula (1937). Sabu, the elephant boy. London: Dent. ISBN 9780939660148. OCLC 475662289.
- Flaherty, Frances Hubbard (1984). The odyssey of a film-maker: Robert Flaherty's story. Putney, VT: Threshold Books. ISBN 9780939660148. OCLC 754885242.
