= Yohann Kouam =

French filmmaker

- Born: Lille, France
- Occupations: Actor, director, producer, screen writer, editor
- Years active: 2004–present

Yohann Kouam (born 1982), is a French filmmaker as well as a producer, screenwriter of Cameroonian descent. He has made several critically acclaimed short films.

== Personal life ==
Yohann is a French film director. His father is an accountant and mother is a hotelier.

== Career ==
He studied film editing at Institut des arts de diffusion (IAD) in Brussels, and then Translation Studies in France. He later became a teaching assistant in high school to give language lessons.

In 2007, Kouam made a short film Fragments de vie. With its critical reception, he made the second short film Les dimanches de Léa in 2010. He then made the short film The Return in 2013, which became internationally acclaimed. In 2016, he made the film From San Francisco with Love.

== Filmography ==
Year	Film	Role	Note	Ref.
2004	Frères (Fragments of Lives)	Director, Writer	short film	
2007	Fragments de vie (Fragments of Lives)	Director, Writer	short film	
2010	Les dimanches de Léa (Lea's Sundays)	Director	short film	
2013	Le Retour (The Return)	Director	short film	
2016	From San Francisco with Love	Director, Writer	short film	
2023	Après l'aurore (After Dawn)	Director, Writer	short film	

== Awards & Nominations ==
Organisation	Year	Category	Result	Work	Ref.
Palm Springs International ShortFest	2014	Best of the Festival - Live Action	Nominated	The Return	
Rhode Island International Film Festival	2014	Grand Prize - Best Short	Nominated	The Return	
Rhode Island International Film Festival	2014	Alternative Spirit Award - Short	Won	The Return	
Chéries-Chéris	2014	Grand Prize Chéries-Chéris	Won	The Return	
Hainan International Film Festival	2023	Golden Coconut - Best short film	Nominated	Après l'aurore (After Dawn)	
