= Oidhche Sheanchais =

1934 film by Robert J. Flaherty

- Title card
- Directed by: Robert J. Flaherty
- Starring: Seáinín Tom Ó Dioráin; Colman 'Tiger' King; Maggie Dirrane; Michael Dillane; Patch 'Red Beard' Ruadh
- Cinematography: Robert J. Flaherty
- Edited by: John Goldman
- Production company: Gainsborough Pictures
- Distributed by: Gaumont British Distributors
- Release date: 1935
- Running time: 11 minutes
- Country: Ireland
- Language: Irish

Oidhche Sheanchais (Irish: [ˌiːçə ˈhanˠəxəʃ]; "A Night of Storytelling"; variously given as The Storyteller, The Story Teller, Storyteller's Night, Night of Story-telling) is a 1935 Irish film directed by Robert J. Flaherty, who was also the cinematographer for the film. It was produced during the sound recording session for his more famous docufiction film Man of Aran in London, and is notable as the first Irish language sync sound film in the Irish Free State period.

== Production ==
Oidhche Sheanchais was filmed at Gaumont Studios.

== Plot ==
Four islanders (who are actually the cast of Man of Aran) are gathered around the hearth. The film begins with an excerpt of a traditional sean-nós song performed by Maggie Tom Ní Mhaoláin (Maggie Dirrane). Seanchaí Seáinín Tom Ó Dioráin tells a traditional story called Máirtín Mac an Rí, a version of the maritime folk legend The Knife against the Wave. In the story, a fisherman successfully defends himself against the onslaught of a supernatural storm at sea by casting his knife against an oncoming wave; he is later summoned to the Otherworld, where he learns that with his knife cast he injured a fairy woman, whom he can only heal by removing the knife; upon doing so, he is rewarded. Versions of the legend are common in other parts of Europe, including Spain and Finland.

== Loss and rediscovery ==
The film opened in a small number of cinemas in Dublin and Cork on St. Patrick's Day in 1935. The press reaction was generally favourable with reviewers impressed by the seanchaí's performance. A critic from The Irish Times praised the film, although he did not understand Irish. But the public's reaction was one of apathy and it was withdrawn from general release after a week or two.

A fire was believed to have destroyed all copies in 1943, but a nitrate distribution print was re-cataloged in 2012 in Harvard University's Houghton Library and soon pointed out by researchers. A restored 35 mm version was premiered in 2015.

This version is only 11 minutes in length. Other records of a 20-minute version featuring exterior shots of the cottage appear to have been erroneous.

In November 2016, the film received its first ever television broadcast on TG4, Ireland's national language station. It was preceded by a 38 minute documentary called Oíche Chaillte an tSeanchaí (The Lost Night of the Storyteller). Directed by Kieran Concannon, this gave the background story of Oidhche Sheanchais.

== See also ==
- Seanchaí
- List of docufiction films
- Ethnofiction
