= Kenneth Durant (journalist) =

American journalist (1889–1972)

Kenneth Durant (1889–1972) was an American pro-Soviet journalist, director of the American branch of the Soviet press agency Tass from 1923 to 1944.

== Life ==
Durant was born into a wealthy family from Philadelphia, and his great-uncle was William West Durant. At Harvard he was friends with the radical journalist John Reed. In 1919, he attended the Versailles peace conference as an aide to Edward M. House.

Durant became press secretary to the unrecognised Soviet envoy to the United States. From 1923 to 1944, he headed the American branch of Soviet news agency Telegraph Agency of the Soviet Union (TASS). Employees at TASS included Eugene Lyons. According to British security services records, he was expelled from the United States in 1925 due to his connection with various Communist front organisations. In 1926 at his home on St. Luke's Place, he and his wife received Hede Massing and Julian Gumperz during a long stay in the United States.

In the late 1920s he formed a relationship with the poet Genevieve Taggard, while he was married to the literary editor Ernestine Evans. Durant and Taggard married in 1935. After the death of Taggard he retired to Vermont to write articles about outdoor subjects, and in 1950 married the film editor Helen van Dongen. Together they worked on a study of the origins and evolution of the Adirondack guideboat.
