= Genevieve Taggard =

American poet

Genevieve Taggard (November 28, 1894 – November 8, 1948) was an American poet.

== Biography ==
Genevieve Taggard was born in Waitsburg, Washington, to James Taggard and Alta Arnold, both of whom were school teachers. Her parents were both active members of the Disciples of Christ, and at age two her parents moved to Honolulu, Hawaii, where they became missionaries and founded a school in which they also taught.

Genevieve Taggard began writing poetry at the early age of 13. In 1914 the family left Hawaii, and Taggard enrolled at the University of California, Berkeley. Here she became an active member of the socialist political and literary community. She graduated in 1919 upon which she moved to New York City in 1920.

Once in New York she started working for the publisher B. W. Huebsch and in 1921 she co-founded the journal The Measure along with fellow writer and friend Maxwell Anderson. In the same year she married poet and novelist Robert Wolf with whom she had her only child Marcia Wolf (later Liles). Upon living in New York for most of the 1920s she assumed a teaching position at Mount Holyoke College, where she taught from 1929 to 1930.

In 1931, she was a Guggenheim Fellow. In 1932, she accepted a professorship at Bennington College. In 1934 Taggard and Wolf divorced, and the following year she married Kenneth Durant. In 1934, she moved on to teach at Sarah Lawrence College, where she remained until 1947, a year before her death.

Her poems were published in The Nation, The Kenyon Review, The New Yorker, The New Republic.

During the 1930s, sparked in part by the Great Depression, but also largely by her philanthropic upbringing and her commitment to socialism, her poetry began to reflect her political and social views much more prominently. During this time a Guggenheim Fellowship allowed her to spend a year in Mallorca, Spain, and Antibes, France. The experience of Spain in its time shortly before the Spanish Civil War gave further rise and inspiration to her cause of raising social and political awareness of civil rights issues.

Her papers are held at Dartmouth College and the New York Public Library.

== Selected works ==
=== Poetry ===
- For Eager Lovers. New York: Thomas Seltzer. 1922.
- Hawaiian Hilltop, Wyckoff & Gelber, 1923
- May Days: An Anthology of Verse from Masses-Liberator, Boni & Liveright, 1925
- Words for the Chisel, A.A. Knopf, 1926
- Travelling Standing Still, A.A. Knopf, 1928
- Not Mine to Finish: Poems 1928–1934, Harper & brothers, 1934
- Calling Western Union, Harper & brothers, 1936
- Collected Poems: 1918–1938, Harper & brothers, 1938
- Long View, Harper & brothers, 1942
- A Part of Vermont, The River Press, 1945
- Slow Music Harper & brothers, 1946
- Origin: Hawaii: poems, D. Angus, 1947
- To test the joy, selected poetry and prose; introduction by Terese Svoboda; edited and with essays by Anne Hammond, Norwich : Boiler House Press, 2023, ISBN 978-1-915812-02-5
- The Bowling Green - An Anthology of Verse selected by Christopher Morley (Doubleday, Page and Company, 1924), 149-151.

=== Biography ===
- The Life and Mind of Emily Dickinson, A.A. Knopf, 1930
