= Monica Flaherty Frassetto =

American filmmaker and archaeologist

- Born: Monica Flaherty; May 4, 1920; Norwalk, Connecticut
- Died: June 14, 2008 (aged 88); Dummerston, Vermont
- Occupations: Archaeologist and Filmmaker
- Spouse(s): Roy Lockwood, 1947–51; Roberto Frassetto
- Parent(s): Robert J. Flaherty; Frances H. Flaherty

Monica Flaherty Frassetto (1920–2008) was a filmmaker and archaeologist.

== Biography ==
Born in Norwalk, Connecticut, Frassetto was the daughter of pioneering filmmakers Robert J. Flaherty and Frances Hubbard Flaherty. On her third birthday, Frassetto's parents brought their daughter to the Pacific island of Samoa where they began working on Moana, their 1926 documentary film.

Frassetto attended school in Heidelberg, Germany, and Devon, England. While in Europe she apprenticed with German scenic designer Hein Heckroth and Swiss painter Kurt Seligmann.

In 1940, Frassetto took flying lessons in the United States. From 1942–44, she was stationed in Alamogordo, New Mexico, where she was a ferry pilot and Women Airforce Service Pilot.

After the war, Frassetto took a job as a researcher at Fortune and worked for the Betty Parsons Art Gallery in New York from 1948–1952. She married Roy Lockwood, a British film and radio director, in 1947. They divorced in 1951.

Frassetto lived in the US Virgin Islands from 1951–56, where she organized archaeological research programs there and in Puerto Rico. In Puerto Rico, she met and married Roberto Frassetto, an Italian archaeologist. They worked together and lived in La Spezia, Italy, between 1960 and 1966. Frassetto then returned to Puerto Rico, where she lived until 1970, when she moved back to the Flaherty farm in Dummerston, Vermont, to look after her mother. She lived in Vermont for 38 years, where she continued to run the Flaherty film study center, started by her mother.

After she returned to Vermont, Frassetto donated her home in Puerto Rico to the Conservation Society of Puerto Rico.

== Moana with Sound ==
Frassetto received an NEA grant in 1975 on which she returned to the island of Savai'i in Western Samoa, where her parents had first filmed Moana in 1924. She traveled with long-time friend and fellow filmmaker Richard Leacock. There she recorded a new soundtrack for the film consisting of field recordings and traditional songs, which she edited and synched to the film once back at MIT, again with Leacock. As the two had not recorded dialogue, Frassetto later returned to Hawaii to record with Samoan people there. She toured with the new film–Moana with Sound–from 1981 until her death.

== Archaeology ==
In 2018, her rubbings of Taíno petroglyphs like ones found in the town of Jayuya in the mid-1950s were selected by artist Jorge González for inclusion in his installation titled Ayacavo Guarocoel, shown at the Whitney Museum of American Art. For a 1960 study, "A Preliminary Report on Petroglyphs in Puerto Rico," Frassetto made sixty surface prints at 13 sites in Puerto Rico. Frassetto's 1960 study of the Cueva del Indio site was a noted example of documentation.
